= Jōnoyama Kofun =

Kofun period burial mound in Tainai, Hokuriku, Japan

- 城の山古墳 (Japanese)
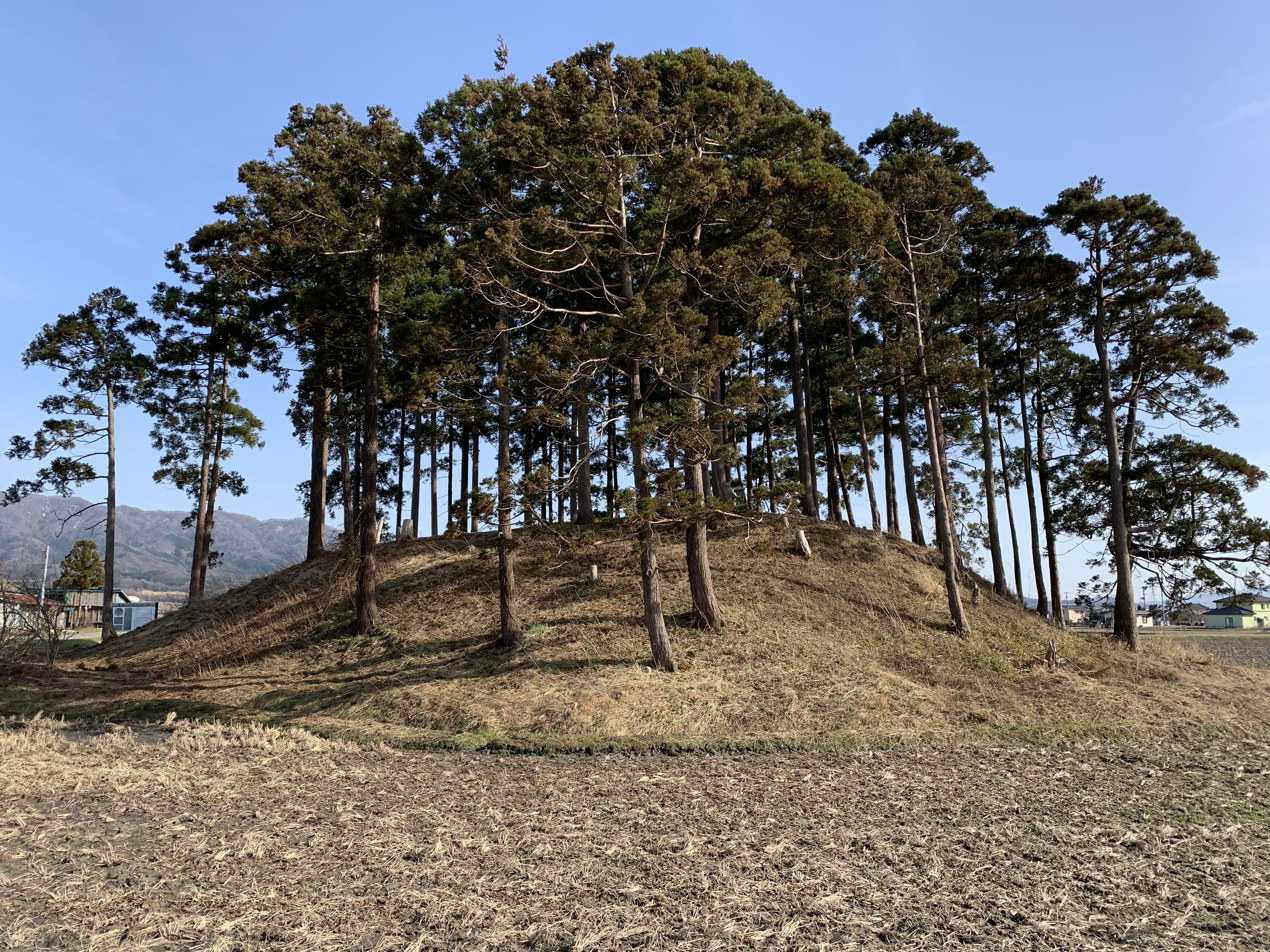
- Jōnoyama Kofun

- Jōnoyama Kofun Jōnoyama Kofun (Japan)
- 38°02′33″N 139°22′22″E
- Type: Kofun
- Periods: Kofun period
- Location: Tainai, Niigata, Japan
- Region: Hokuriku region

History
- Built: early 4th century AD

Site notes
- Area: 7,451.0 m^{2} (80,202 sq ft)
- Excavation dates: 1995
- Public access: Yes (no public facilities)

The Jōnoyama Kofun (城の山古墳) is a Kofun period burial mound located in the Ōtsuka neighborhood of the city of Tainai, Niigata in the Hokuriku region of Japan. The tumulus was designated a National Historic Site of Japan in 2019. It is the third largest known kofun in Niigata Prefecture.

== Overview ==
The Jōnoyama Kofun was built in the first half of the 4th century AD. It is considered to be the northernmost point on the Sea of Japan for early Kofun period culture. The tumulus was first surveyed and excavated in 1995. The tumulus is an elliptical empun (円墳) domed kofun, measuring 41 meters east-to-west by 35 meters north-to-south, with a height of five meters above the surrounding paddy fields. As it once had a moat, it was long assumed to have originally been a keyhole-shaped kofun, but excavation has now been shown that the moat was added at a later date, and there is no other evidence that the tumulus was ever keyhole-shaped.

The first excavation recovered some 200 pieces of earthenware from the top of the tumulus, and found no evidence that the tumulus had been tampered with in antiquity. The burial chamber was opened in the fourth excavation in 2005, and was found to enclose a wooden boat-shaped sarcophagus with a total length of 8 meters and a width of about 1.5 meters, carved from a single block of wood. Due to the large amount of vermillion red pigment used around the casket and many grave goods, the person buried in this tumulus is regarded as having a strong connection to the culture of the imperial court.

Also among the excavated items was a human arm bone. In 2012, a tooth fragment was also discovered. Both indicate that the person interred in this tumulus was a young person.

Grave goods included a bronze mirror with an embossed dragon design. The mirror is about 10 cm in diameter, and depicts a single-horned dragon with an open mouth curled around the center, with a hole for a string to pass through, indicating that it was intended to be worn as a decoration. This design is found in Jin dynasty China (266–420 AD) from around the first to third centuries, but is rare in Japan. Other items included magatama and cylindrical jade beads, iron swords, an iron ax, and also gold fittings that were once bow attachments, and leather box containing an ax, hook and arrows. The leather was lacquered, and had a rhombus pattern on the surface decorated by embroidery. Leather has been rarely excavated in Japan and has not been found north of Shiga Prefecture. Although most of the grave goods are similar to what would normally be found in kofun of the Kinai region, some of the earthenware was found to be from Zoku-Jōmon period, and may have come from distant Hokkaido.

The tumulus is located approximately six minutes by car from Nakajō Station on the JR East Uetsu Main Line.

== See also ==
- List of Historic Sites of Japan (Niigata)
