= Higashi-Niigata Thermal Power Station =

Power station in Japan

Higashi-Niigata Thermal Power Station 東新潟火力発電所
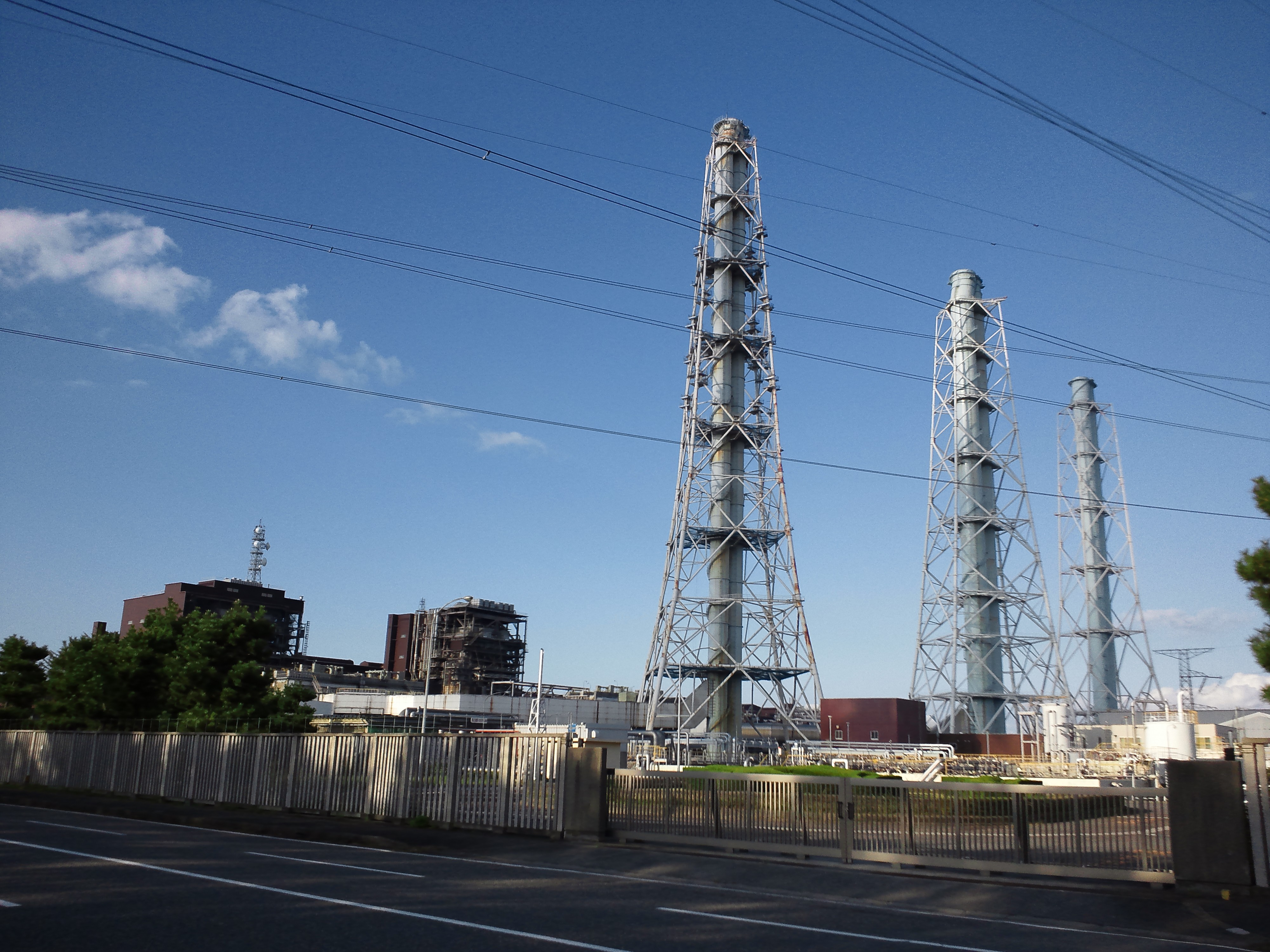
- Higashi-Niigata Thermal Power Station
- Country: Japan
- Location: Seirō, Niigata
- Coordinates: 37°59′59″N 139°15′28″E
- Status: Operational
- Commission date: 1971
- Owner: Tohoku Electric
- Operator: Tohoku Electric Power

Thermal power station
- Primary fuel: Heavy Oil, Crude Oil, LNG

Power generation
- Units operational: 6
- Units decommissioned: 2
- Nameplate capacity: 4780 MW

Higashi-Niigata Thermal Power Station (東新潟火力発電所, Higashi-Niigata Karyoku Hatsudensho) is a large fossil-fuel thermal power station operated by Tohoku Electric in the town of Seirō, Niigata, Japan. The facility is located on the Sea of Japan coast and is adjacent to Niigata Higashi Port.

== History ==
The Higashi Niigata Thermal Power Station started operations in November 1972. A total of six units (18 generators) were constructed, making it the largest thermal power plant operated by Tohoku Electric and one of the largest in Japan. It was originally supplied by domestic natural gas from the Ago-oki oil and gas field offshore Niigata Prefecture, but since 1998 has been supplied by an LNG terminal installed in the adjacent port area. The Niigata Thermal Power Station and the Shin-Sendai Thermal Power Station are also supplied from this facility.

Minato Unit 1 and Port Unit 2 were constructed in 1972 and 1975 as a joint venture between Tohoku Electric and Nippon Light Metal. Unit 1 and Unit 2 (online from 1977 and 1983) are standard fossil-fuel burning steam turbine driven power plants. Unit 3 (on-line 1984 and 1985) is a 1100 deg C-class multi-turbine combined cycle (CC) plant and has Tohoku Electric's first waste heat recovery system employing three gas turbines and one steam turbine per system. Unit 4 (on-line 1999 and 2006) is a 1400 deg C class multi-turbine More Advanced Combined Cycle (MACC) system, with two gas turbines and one steam turbine per system.

Due to power shortages in the grid caused by the Tōhoku earthquake and tsunami in March 2011, two emergency generation systems were installed as a temporary measure, but were dismantled in 2015.

== Plant details ==
Unit	Fuel	Type	Capacity	On line	Status
Minato 3	Light Oil	Gas turbine	26.9 MW	2011	Decommissioned 2015; scrapped
5	LNG	Gas turbine	339 MW	2012	Decommissioned 2015; scrapped
Minato-1	Heavy Oil / LNG	Steam turbine	350 MW	1972	operational
Minato-2	Heavy Oil / LNG	Steam turbine	350 MW	1975	operational
1	Heavy Oil/ Crude Oil / LNG	Steam turbine	600 MW	1977	operational
2	Heavy Oil/ Crude Oil / LNG	Steam turbine	600 MW	1983	operational
3-1	LNG	CC	614 MW	1984	operational
3-2	LNG	CC	614 MW	1985	operational
4-1	LNG	MACC	826 MW	1996	operational
4-2	LNG	MACC	826 MW	2006	operational

== See also ==
- Energy in Japan
- List of power stations in Japan
