= Higashi-ku, Niigata =

Ward of Niigata City in Chūbu, Japan

Higashi-ku 東区
- Ward
- Higashi Ward
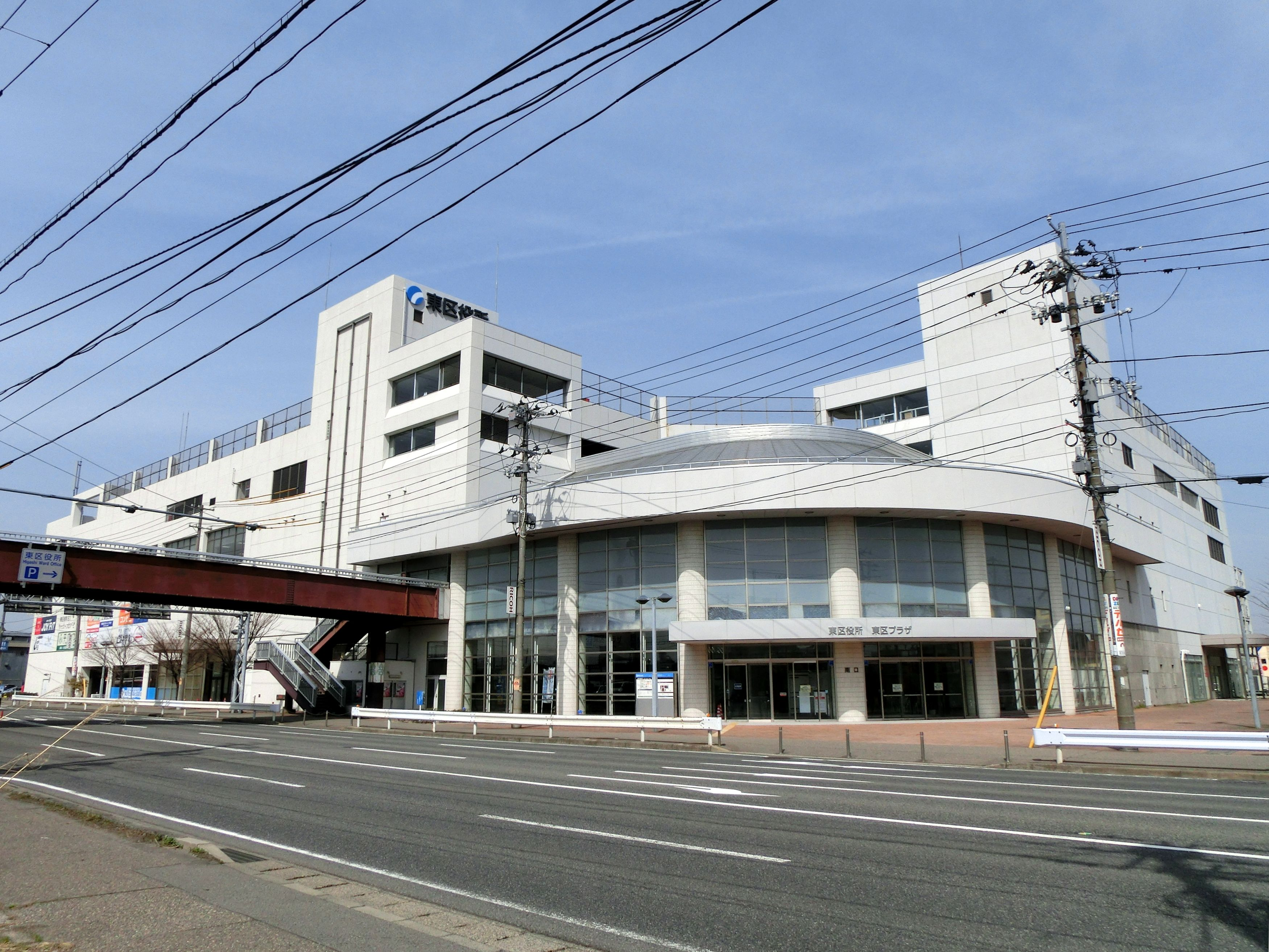
- Higashi-ku Ward Office

- Location of Higashi-ku in Niigata City

- Coordinates: 37°55′29.4″N 139°5′33.6″E
- Country: Japan
- Region: Kōshin'etsu, Hokuriku (Chūbu)
- Prefecture: Niigata
- City: Niigata

Area
  - Total: 38.62 km^{2} (14.91 sq mi)

Population (September 1, 2016)
  - Total: 136,224
  - Density: 3,527/km^{2} (9,136/sq mi)
- Time zone: UTC+9 (Japan Standard Time)
- Address: 1-4-1 Shimokido, Higashi-ku, Niigata-shi, Niigata-ken 950-8709
- Phone number: 025-272-1000
- Website: Official website

Higashi-ku (東区, Higashi-ku) is one of the eight wards of Niigata City, Niigata Prefecture, in the Hokuriku region of Japan. As of 1 September 2016, the ward had an estimated population of 136,224 in 60,830 households and a population density of 3500 persons per km^{2}. The total area of the ward was 38.62 square kilometres (14.91 sq mi). After Chūō-ku, Higashi-ku is the second smallest ward in Niigata City, making up about 5% of the total land area. It ranks third for largest population, with about 17% of Niigata's residents living in the Higashi-ku.

== Geography ==
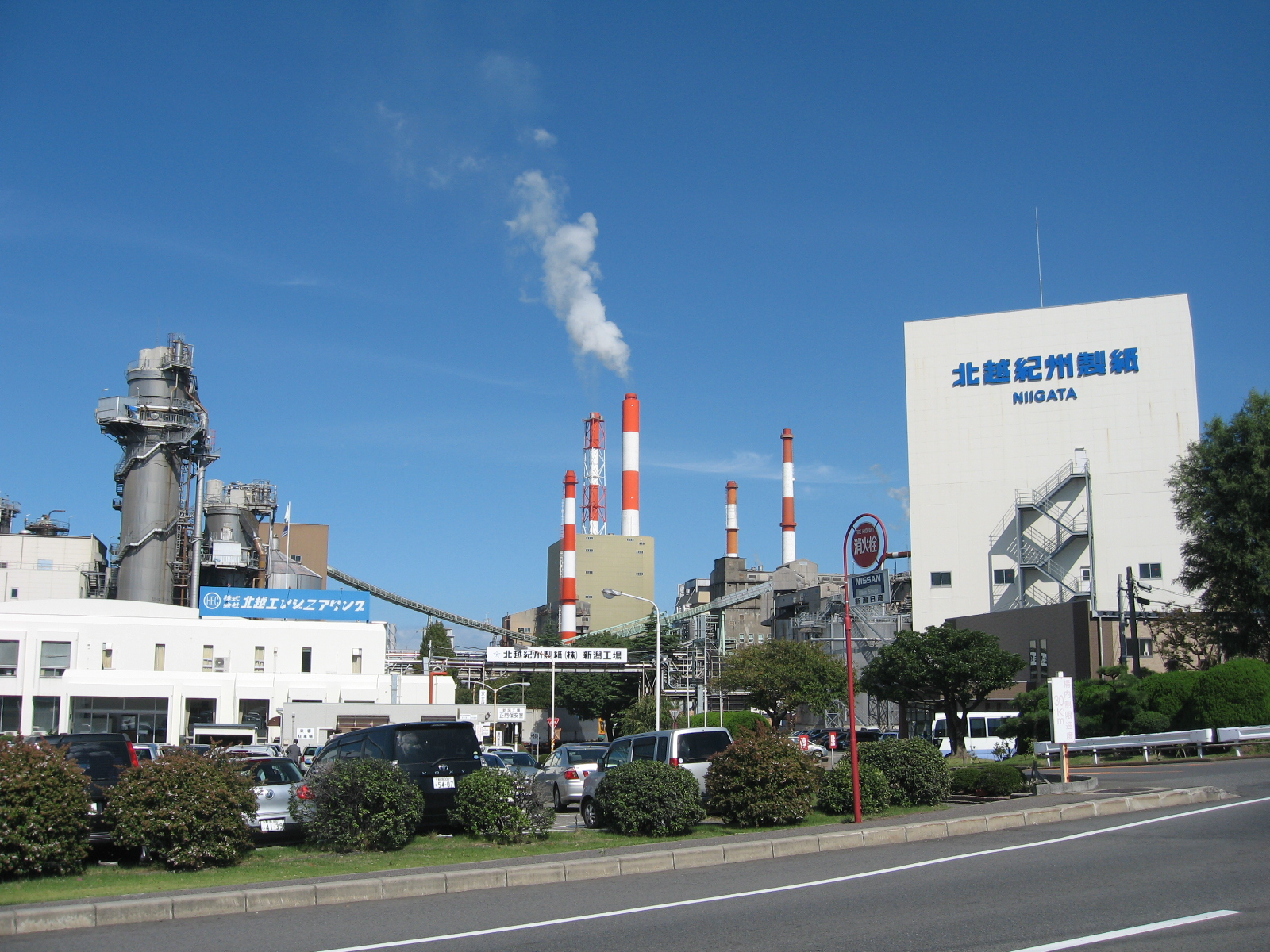
Hokuetsu Kishu Paper

Higashi-ku is located in north-east Niigata city, directly east of the central Chūō-ku and is bordered by the Sea of Japan to the north. The Shinano River is to the west. In the south is the Nihonkai-Tōhoku Expressway. The Agano River in the eastern part of the ward is on the border with neighboring Kita-ku. Most housing districts are located in the northern and southern parts of the ward, while the center consists mainly of business and manufacturing districts. Niigata Airport and Niigata Harbor are located in Higashi-ku.

=== Surrounding municipalities ===
- Niigata Prefecture
  - Chūō-ku, Niigata
  - Kita-ku, Niigata
  - Kōnan-ku, Niigata

== History ==
The area of present-day Higashi-ku was part of ancient Echigo Province. The town of Nuttari was established on April 1, 1889, within Kitakanbara District, Niigata with the establishment of the municipalities system. The villages of Ogata (大形) and Ishiyama (石山) were created on November 1, 1901. The city of Niigata annexed Nuttari (沼垂) in 1914, and Ogata and Ishiyama in 1943. Niigata became a government-designated city on April 1, 2007, and was divided into wards.

== Education ==
=== University ===
- University of Niigata Prefecture

=== Primary and secondary schools ===
Higashi-ku has 12 public elementary schools and nine public middle schools operated by the city government. The ward has two public high schools operated by the Niigata Prefectural Board of Education. There is also one North Korean school, Niigata Elementary and Junior High School (新潟朝鮮初中級学校).

== Transportation ==
=== Railway ===
JR East - Shin'etsu Main Line

- Echigo-Ishiyama

JR East - Hakushin Line

- Higashi-Niigata - Ōgata

=== Transit bus ===
- Transit bus operated by Niigata Kotsu
  - C5
  - S8 / S9
  - E1 / E2 / E3 / E4 / E5 / E6 / E7 / E8

=== Highways ===
- Nihonkai-Tōhoku Expressway
- National Route 7
- National Route 113

=== Airport ===
- Niigata Airport

== Local attractions ==
=== Places ===
- Yamanoshita Minato Tower
