= Okuyama shōjōkan =

Shōen in Tainai and Shibata, Hokuriku, Japan

Okuyama Manor
- 奥山荘 (Japanese)
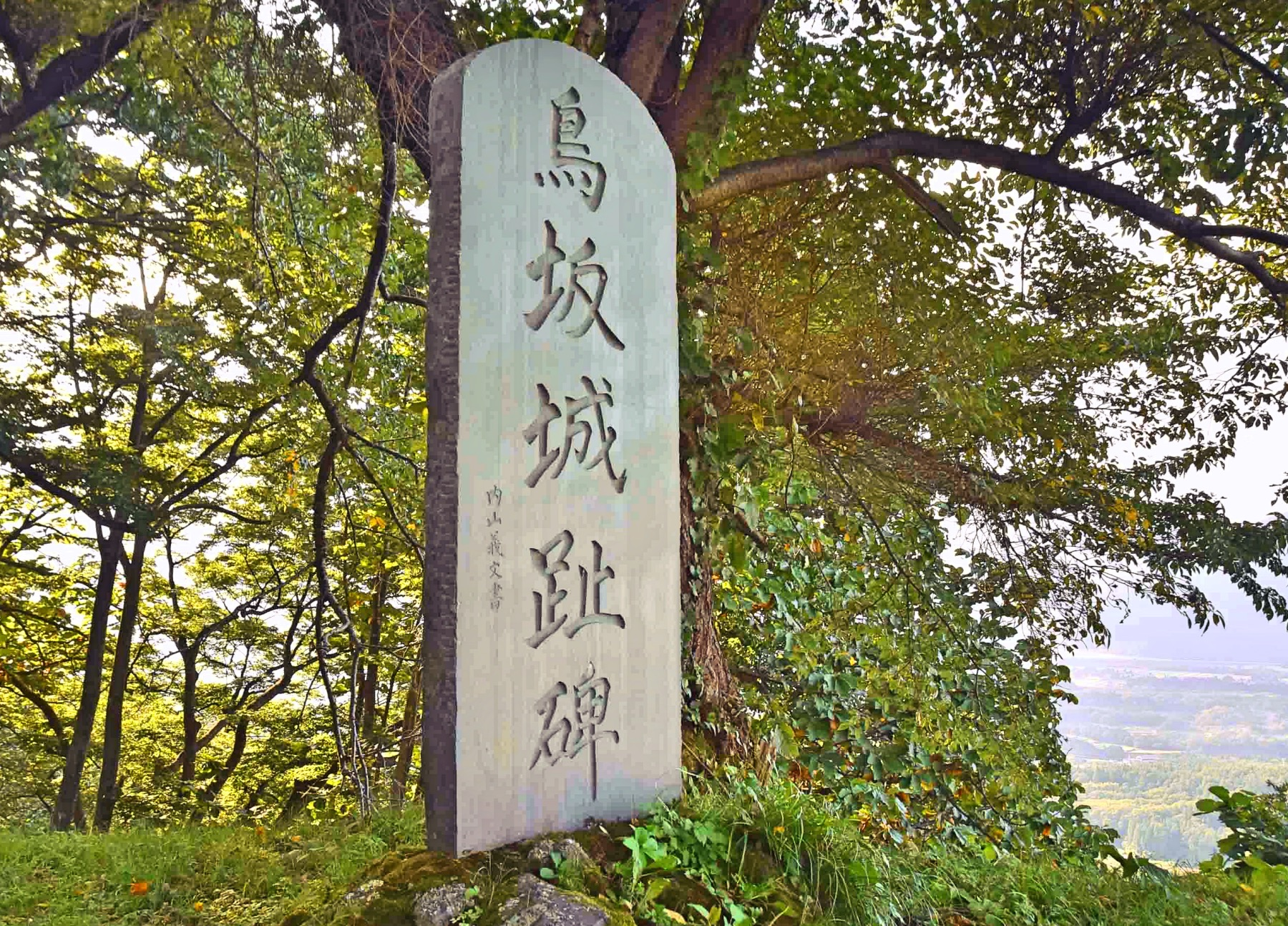
- Site of Tossaka Castle

- Okuyama Manor Okuyama shōjōkan (Japan)
- 38°03′18″N 139°25′18″E
- Type: settlement, castle
- Location: Tainai, Shibata, Niigata Japan
- Region: Hokuriku region

History
- Built: Muromachi period

Site notes
- Public access: Yes (Park, Museum)

The Okuyama Manor (奥山荘, Okuyama no shō) was a shōen, or great landed estate, located in what is now the cities of Tainai and Shibata, Niigata Prefecture in the Hokuriku region of Japan, from the end of the Heian period through the Sengoku period. A series of thirteen ruins were collectively designated a National Historic Site of Japan in 1984 as the Okuyama Manor, Castle, and Fortified Residence Sites (奥山荘城館遺跡, Okuyama no shōjōkan iseki).

== Overview ==
Shōen were private, tax-free, autonomous feudal manors which arose after the decay of the ritsuryō system. Hereditary landowners, often descendants of estate managers sent by the original stakeholders, commended shares of the revenue produced to more powerful leaders at the court, in return for protection of their independence and tax-free status. The foundation of the estate in the late Heian era is uncertain, but it was held by the Jō clan (城氏), who had the status of a "pioneer developer" (開発領主) and who nominally commended his revenues to one of the Five regent houses. However, after the establishment of the Kamakura shogunate, the estate was awarded to Wada Yoshimochi, the brother of Wada Yoshimori, one of Minamoto no Yoritomo's senior retainers. The Wada clan had the post of Jitō, but continued to retain the Jō clan to manage the estate. Even after the purge of the Wada clan in 1213, the cadet branch at Okuyama, was split into three branches: the Hōjō, Nakajō and Nanjō clans after the death of Wada Yoshimori. During the late Muromachi period, the Nakajō clan became retainers of the Nagao clan and from thence were in the service of the Uesugi clan. They relocated from the Egami Fortified Residence to Tossaka Castle around 1453. In the Sengoku period, they relocated to Aizu with Uesugi Kagekatsu and the name of disappears from history.

The National Historic Site designation includes the following sites:

- Egami Fortified Residence ruins (江上館跡)
- Tossaka Castle ruins (鳥坂城跡)
- Kurata Castle ruins (倉田城跡)
- Nonaka Stone Pagodas (野中石塔婆群)
- Kotaka-gū Precinct (小鷹宮境内地)
- Idatenyama ruins (韋駄天山遺跡)
- Kurokawa Castle ruins (黒川城跡)
- Zao Gongen ruins (蔵王権現遺跡)
- Kusamizu ruins (臭水遺跡)
- Kaneyama Castle ruins (金山城跡)
- Ganmonyama Castle ruins (願文山城跡)
- Taka Fortified Residence ruins (高館跡)
- Tatenouchi ruins (館ノ内跡)
- Katatsumuriyama Castle ruins (蝸牛山城跡))
- Bō Fortified Residence ruins (坊城館跡)
- Furudate Fortified Residence ruins (古館館跡)
- Tossaka Castle Sanrokukyo Fortified Residence ruins (鳥坂城跡の山麓居館跡)

These thirteen sites include the ruins of castle buildings, religious sites, and production sites. The Egami Fortified Residence ruins were excavated from 1991, with the complete foundations of the main building and adjacent south and north buildings discovered, together with a large amount of Suzu ware and other pottery from the 13th century to the early 16th century. The site also contained four bridges, foundations of the south gate and north gate, and several portions of the moat and earthen ramparts. A small museum exists near this ruin, which is about 20 minutes by car from Nakajo Station on the JR East Uetsu Main Line.

== See also ==
- List of Historic Sites of Japan (Niigata)
