= Kita-ku, Niigata =

Ward of Niigata City in Chūbu, Japan

Kita-ku 北区
- Ward
- Kita Ward
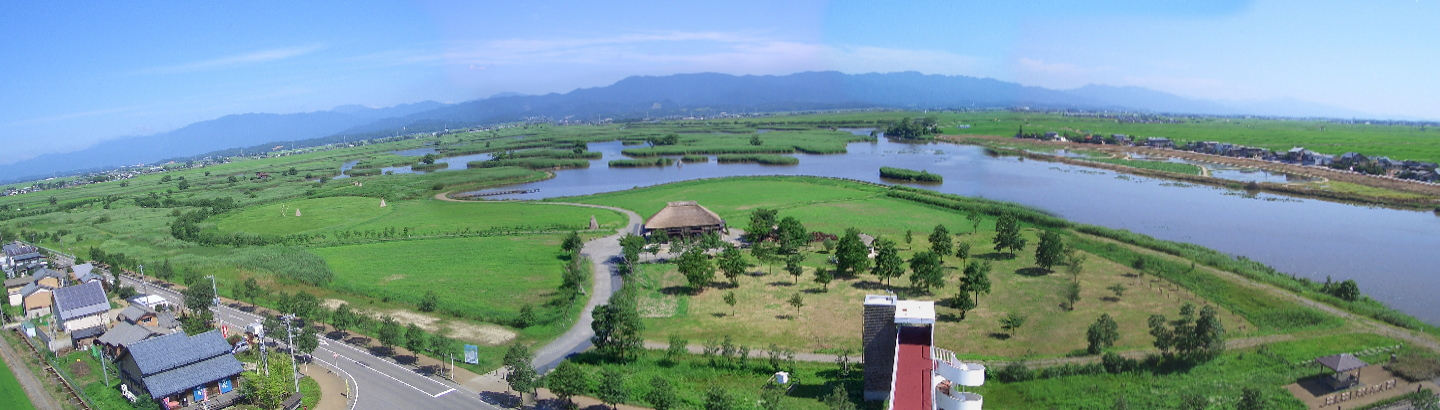
- Fukushimagata Lagoon Park

- Location of Kita-ku in Niigata city

- Coordinates: 37°54′58.5″N 139°13′6.9″E
- Country: Japan
- Region: Kōshin'etsu, Hokuriku (Chūbu)
- Prefecture: Niigata
- City: Niigata

Area
  - Total: 107.72 km^{2} (41.59 sq mi)

Population (September 1, 2016)
  - Total: 74,559
  - Density: 692.16/km^{2} (1,792.7/sq mi)
- Time zone: UTC+9 (Japan Standard Time)
- Address: 3197 Kuzutsuka, Kita-ku, Niigata-shi, Niigata 950-3393
- Phone number: 025-387-1000
- Website: Official website

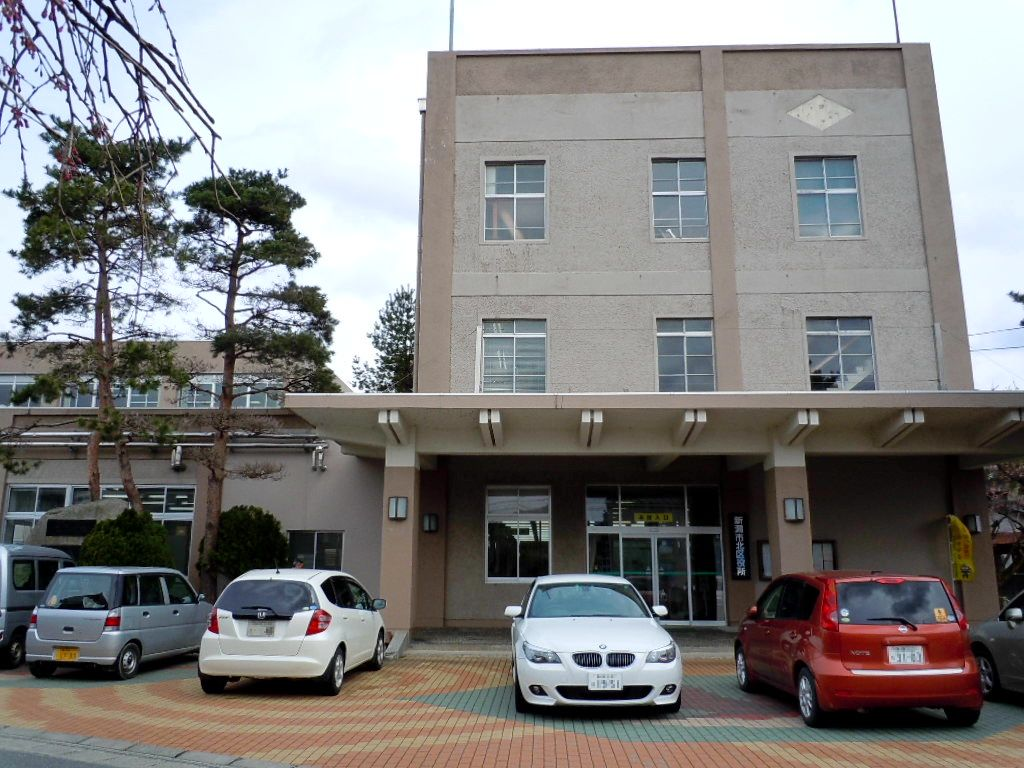
Kita Ward Office

Kita-ku (北区, Kita-ku) is one of the eight wards of Niigata City, Niigata Prefecture, in the Hokuriku region of Japan. As of 1 September 2018, the ward had an estimated population of 74,559 in households and a population density of 690 persons per km^{2}. The total area of the ward was 107.72 square kilometres (41.59 sq mi).

== Geography ==
Kita-ku is located in north-east Niigata city, and is bordered by the Sea of Japan to the north.

=== Surrounding municipalities ===
- Niigata Prefecture
  - Agano
  - Higashi-ku, Niigata
  - Kōnan-ku, Niigata
  - Seiro
  - Shibata

== History ==
The area of present-day Kita-ku was part of ancient Echigo Province. The village of Kuzudzuka was established on April 1, 1889, within Kitakanbara District, Niigata with the establishment of the modern municipalities system, and was raised to town status on November 1, 1901. It was renamed Toyosaka on March 31, 1955, and was elevated to city status on November 1, 1970. The city of Niigata annexed Toyosaka on March 21, 2005. Niigata became a government-designated city on April 1, 2007, and was divided into wards, with former Toyosaka becoming part of the new Kita Ward along with a coastal section of the former Niigata city.

== Education ==
=== University ===
- Niigata University of Health and Welfare

=== Primary and secondary education ===
Kita-ku has 13 public elementary schools and eight public middle schools operated by the Niigata city government. The ward has one public high school operated by the Niigata Prefectural Board of Education and one private high school.

== Transportation ==
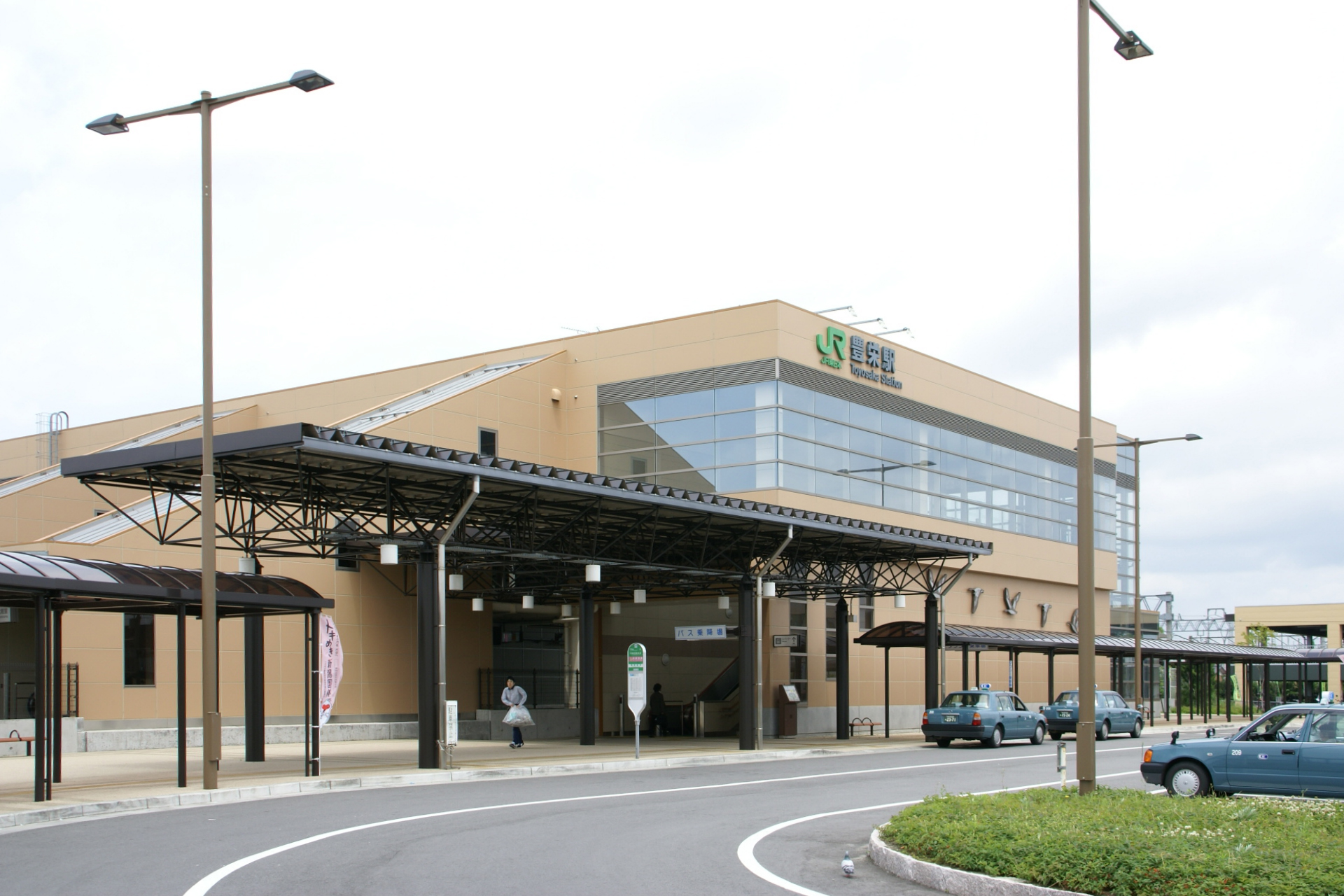
Toyosaka Station

=== Railway ===
JR East - Hakushin Line

- Niizaki - Hayadōri - Toyosaka - Kuroyama

=== Transit bus ===
- Transit bus operated by Niigata Kotsu
  - E2 / E4
  - Toyosaka Sta. - JRA Racecourse
  - Toyosaka Sta. - Tsukioka Onsen

=== Highways ===
- Nihonkai-Tōhoku Expressway
- National Route 7
- National Route 113

== Points of interest ==
=== Places ===
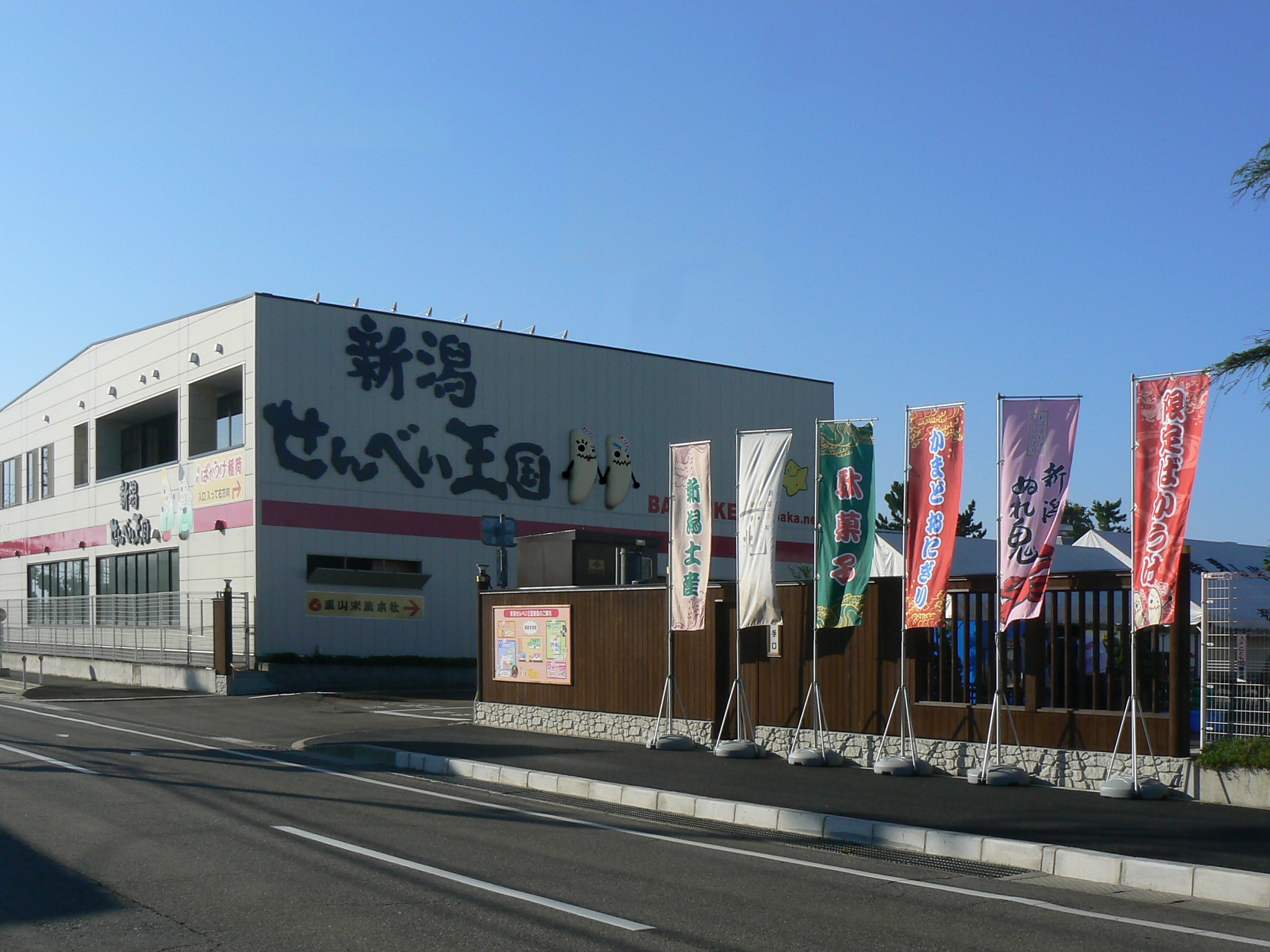
Niigata Senbei Okoku

- Fukushimagata Lagoon Water Park
- Niigata Racecourse, one of the racecourses of JRA
- Niigata Senbei Okoku
