= Niigata Meikun Junior and Senior High School =

Coordinates: 37°52′53.5″N 139°6′48.5″E

- 新潟明訓中学校・高等学校
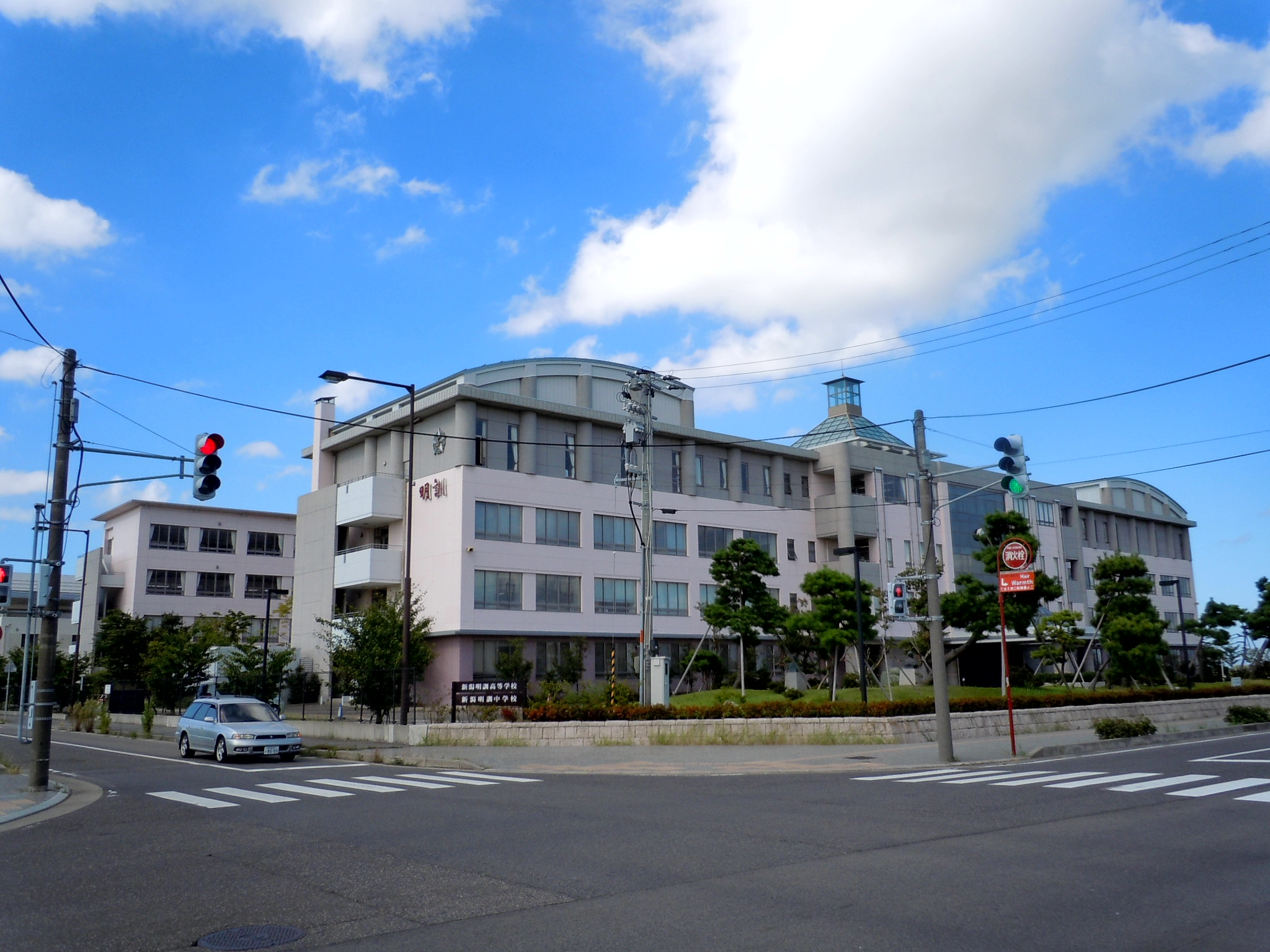
- The school building
- Kōnan-ku, Niigata, Niigata Prefecture; Japan

Information
- Type: Junior high school Senior high school
- Established: 1921
- School code: 15501C
- Grades: Junior high school grades 1-3; Senior high school grades 1-3
- Gender: Mixed-sex education
- Website: Official website

Niigata Meikun Junior and Senior High School (新潟明訓中学校・高等学校, Niigata Meikun Chūgakkō Kōtōgakkō) is a private secondary school in the city of Niigata, Niigata Prefecture, Japan.

== History ==
The school was established in 1921.

In 2004, the campus moved from Kawagishi-chō in Chūō-ku (near Hakusan Station) to Kitayama in Kōnan-ku (near Kameda Station).

In 2007, the junior high school was founded in addition to the existing senior high school.

== Notable alumni ==
- Toku, musician
- Fujisawa Shu, writer
