= Tainai =

Tainai 胎内市
- City
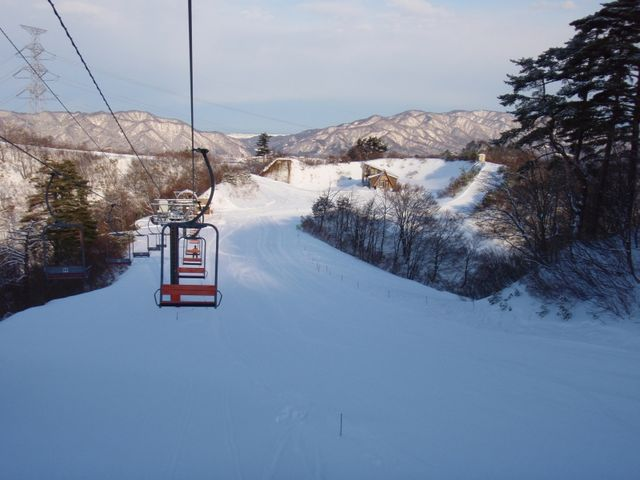
- Tainai Ski Resort

- Flag Seal

- Location of Tainai in Niigata Prefecture

- Coordinates: 38°3′34.9″N 139°24′37.2″E
- Country: Japan
- Region: Chūbu (Kōshin'etsu) (Hokuriku)
- Prefecture: Niigata

Area
  - Total: 264.89 km^{2} (102.27 sq mi)

Population (December 31, 2020)
  - Total: 28,495
  - Density: 107.57/km^{2} (278.61/sq mi)
- Time zone: UTC+9 (Japan Standard Time)
- Phone number: 0254-43-6111
- Address: 2-10 Shinwa, Tainai-shi, Niigata-ken 959-2693
- Climate: Cfa
- Website: Official website
- Symbols
- Bird: Crested kingfisher
- Flower: Tulip
- Tree: Cornus kousa; Pine

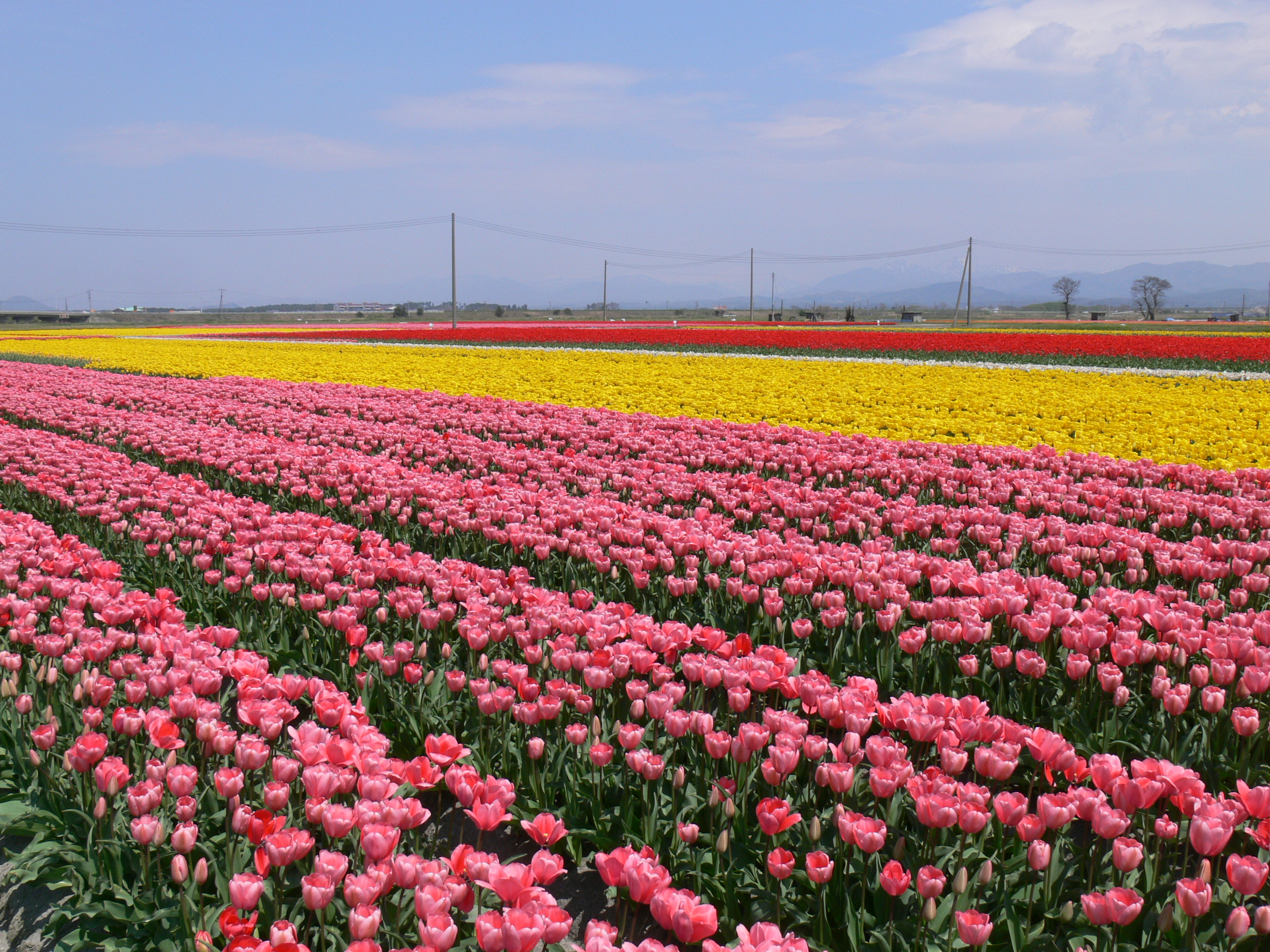
Tulip fields in Tainai

Tainai (胎内市, Tainai-shi) is a city located in Niigata Prefecture, Japan. As of 31 December 2020, the city had an estimated population of 28,495 in 10,821 households, and a population density of 110 persons per km^{2} (288/sq mi). The total area of the city was 264.89 square kilometres (102.27 sq mi).

== Geography ==
Tainai is located in northern Niigata Prefecture, bordered by Yamagata Prefecture to the east and the Sea of Japan to the west. The city area has an elongated shape from east to west along the Tainai River basin. There are number of dams in Tainai, including the Tainaigawa Dam and Tainai Dam.

=== Surrounding municipalities ===
- Niigata Prefecture
  - Murakami
  - Sekikawa
  - Shibata
- Yamagata Prefecture
  - Oguni

=== Climate ===
Tainai has a humid subtropical climate (Köppen Cfa) characterized by warm, wet summers and cold winters with heavy snowfall. The average annual temperature in Tainai is 13.9 °C (57.0 °F). The average annual rainfall is 2,331.2 mm (91.78 in) with September as the wettest month. The temperatures are highest on average in August, at around 26.5 °C (79.7 °F), and lowest in January, at around 2.4 °C (36.3 °F).

Climate data for Nakajō, Tainai, elevation 14 m (46 ft), (1991−2020 normals, extremes 1978−present)
Month	Jan	Feb	Mar	Apr	May	Jun	Jul	Aug	Sep	Oct	Nov	Dec	Year
Record high °C (°F)	15.1 (59.2)	22.1 (71.8)	26.3 (79.3)	31.7 (89.1)	33.2 (91.8)	36.3 (97.3)	39.2 (102.6)	40.8 (105.4)	40.0 (104.0)	33.7 (92.7)	27.3 (81.1)	20.8 (69.4)	40.8 (105.4)
Mean daily maximum °C (°F)	5.1 (41.2)	5.9 (42.6)	10.1 (50.2)	16.6 (61.9)	22.2 (72.0)	25.7 (78.3)	29.3 (84.7)	31.3 (88.3)	27.2 (81.0)	21.1 (70.0)	14.6 (58.3)	8.4 (47.1)	18.1 (64.6)
Daily mean °C (°F)	2.4 (36.3)	2.6 (36.7)	5.8 (42.4)	11.4 (52.5)	17.0 (62.6)	21.0 (69.8)	24.9 (76.8)	26.5 (79.7)	22.4 (72.3)	16.4 (61.5)	10.4 (50.7)	5.2 (41.4)	13.8 (56.9)
Mean daily minimum °C (°F)	−0.2 (31.6)	−0.5 (31.1)	1.8 (35.2)	6.5 (43.7)	12.2 (54.0)	17.0 (62.6)	21.5 (70.7)	22.7 (72.9)	18.6 (65.5)	12.4 (54.3)	6.5 (43.7)	2.1 (35.8)	10.0 (50.1)
Record low °C (°F)	−9.7 (14.5)	−11.2 (11.8)	−9.7 (14.5)	−1.7 (28.9)	4.0 (39.2)	8.1 (46.6)	12.9 (55.2)	13.3 (55.9)	9.0 (48.2)	1.8 (35.2)	−1.3 (29.7)	−10.5 (13.1)	−11.2 (11.8)
Average precipitation mm (inches)	266.6 (10.50)	172.5 (6.79)	143.8 (5.66)	120.3 (4.74)	126.8 (4.99)	143.8 (5.66)	241.4 (9.50)	189.0 (7.44)	172.7 (6.80)	190.6 (7.50)	255.9 (10.07)	304.5 (11.99)	2,331.2 (91.78)
Average precipitation days (≥ 1.0 mm)	26.4	21.5	18.5	13.0	12.1	11.1	13.8	11.3	13.5	15.6	20.3	25.0	202.1
Mean monthly sunshine hours	30.7	52.0	113.2	168.8	200.3	177.9	160.0	201.0	150.4	128.4	82.0	41.8	1,516.9
Source: Japan Meteorological Agency

== Demographics ==
Per Japanese census data, the population of Tainai has declined over the past 50 years.

Historical population
Year	Pop.	±%
1960	36,238	—
1970	35,651	−1.6%
1980	35,605	−0.1%
1990	35,517	−0.2%
2000	34,278	−3.5%
2010	31,424	−8.3%
2020	28,509	−9.3%

== History ==
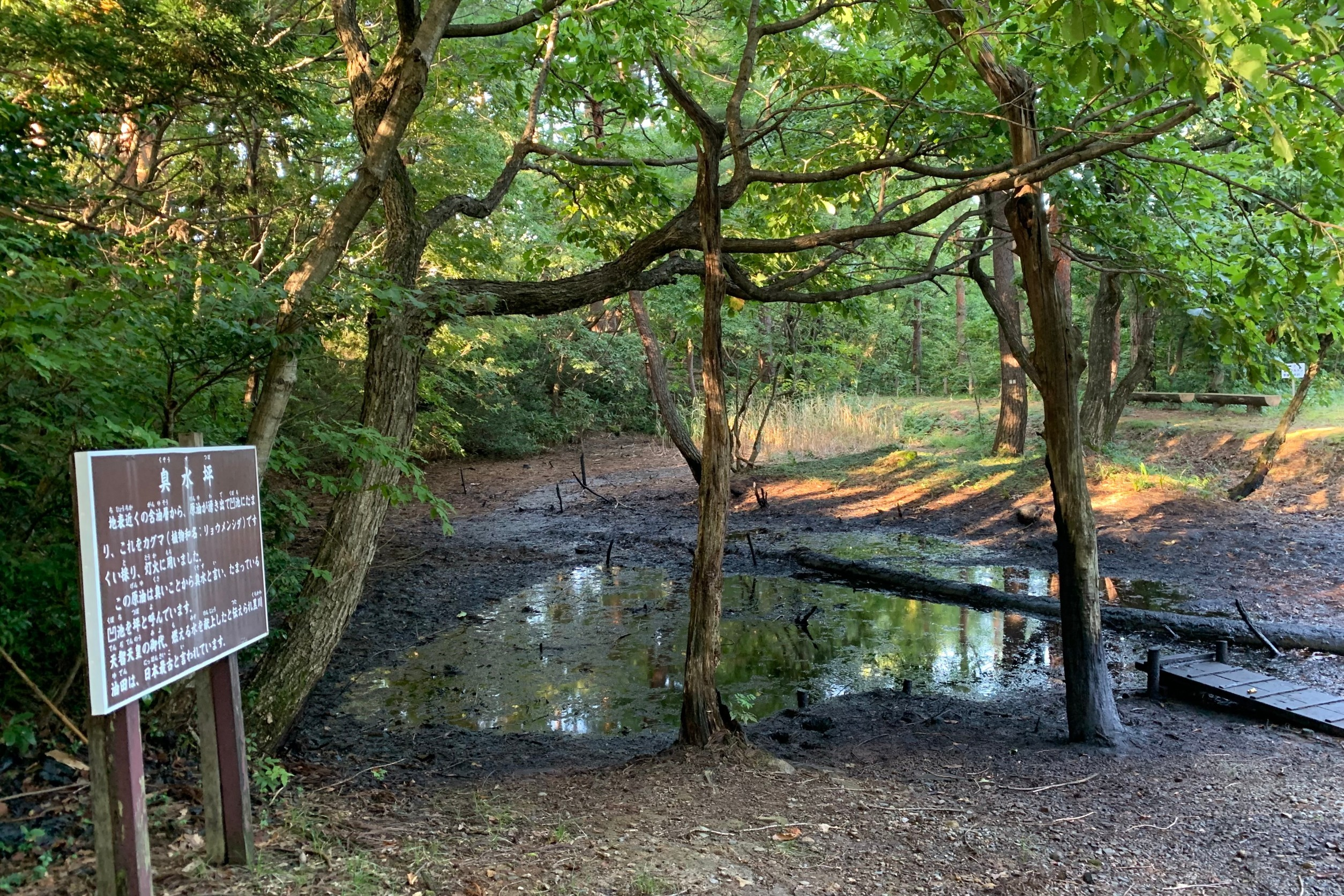
Kusozu Oil Pond

The area of present-day Tainai was part of ancient Echigo Province. Following the Meiji restoration, the area was organized as part of Kitakanbara District, Niigata. The town of Nakajō, and the village of Kurokawa were established with the establishment of the modern municipalities system on April 1, 1889. The city of Tainai was established on September 1, 2005, from the merger of these municipalities.

== Government ==
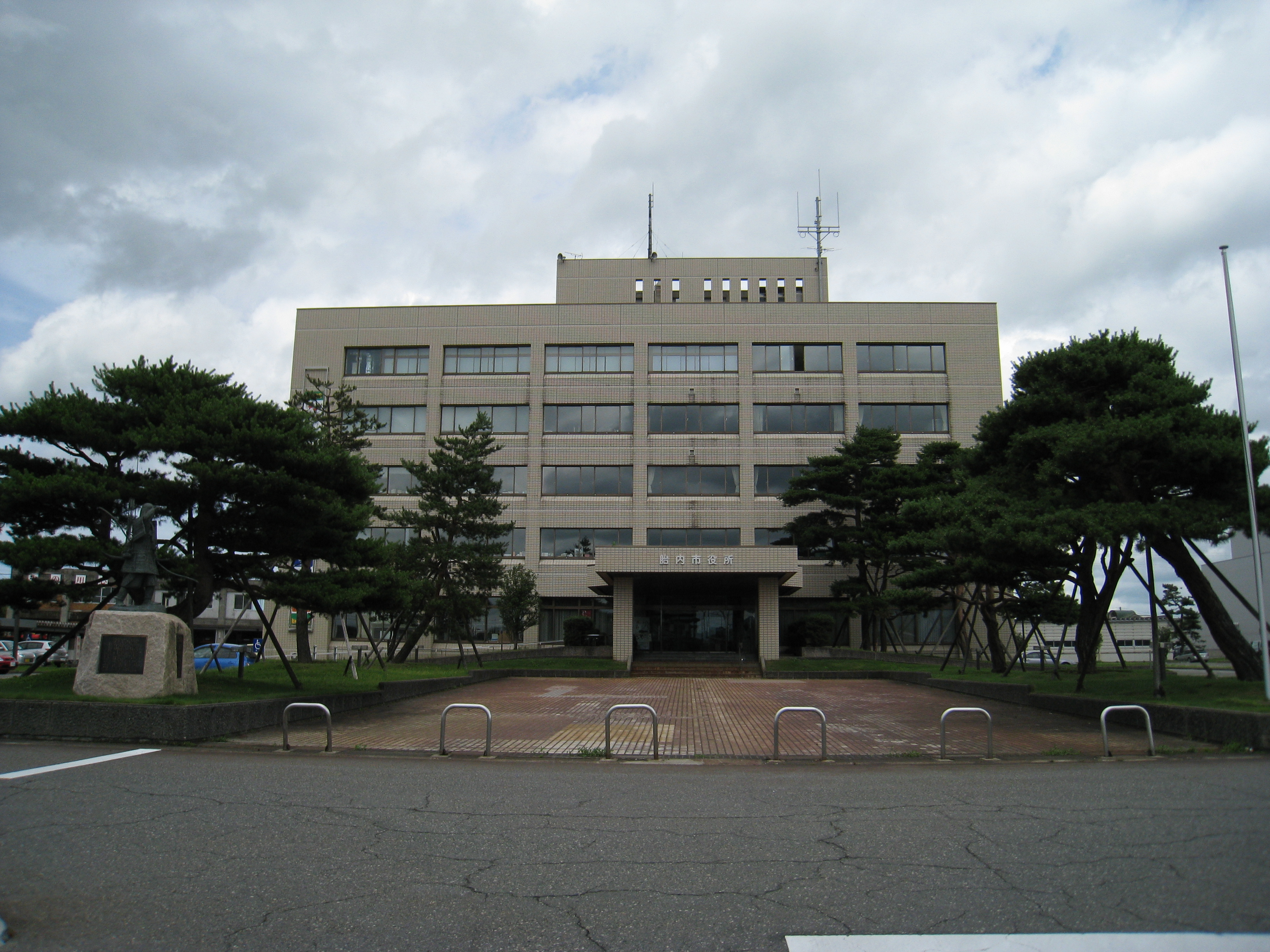
Tainai City Hall

Tainai has a mayor-council form of government with a directly elected mayor and a unicameral city legislature of 14 members. Tainai contributes one member to the Niigata Prefectural Assembly. In terms of national politics, the city is part of Niigata 3rd district of the lower house of the Diet of Japan.

== Economy ==
The economy of Tainai is primarily agricultural, mainly with rice cultivation, vegetables, flower cultivation, livestock farming, and fruit tree cultivation. Hydroelectric power generation also provides significant income to the local economy.

== Education ==
Tainai has six public elementary schools and four public middle schools operated by the city government. The city has one public high school operated by the Niigata Prefectural Board of Education. There is also one private high school.

== Transportation ==
=== Railway ===
JR East - Uetsu Main Line

- Nakajō - Hirakida

=== Highway ===
- Nihonkai-Tōhoku Expressway
- National Route 7
- National Route 113
- National Route 290
- National Route 345

== Sister cities ==
- Carbondale, Illinois, United States

== Local attractions ==
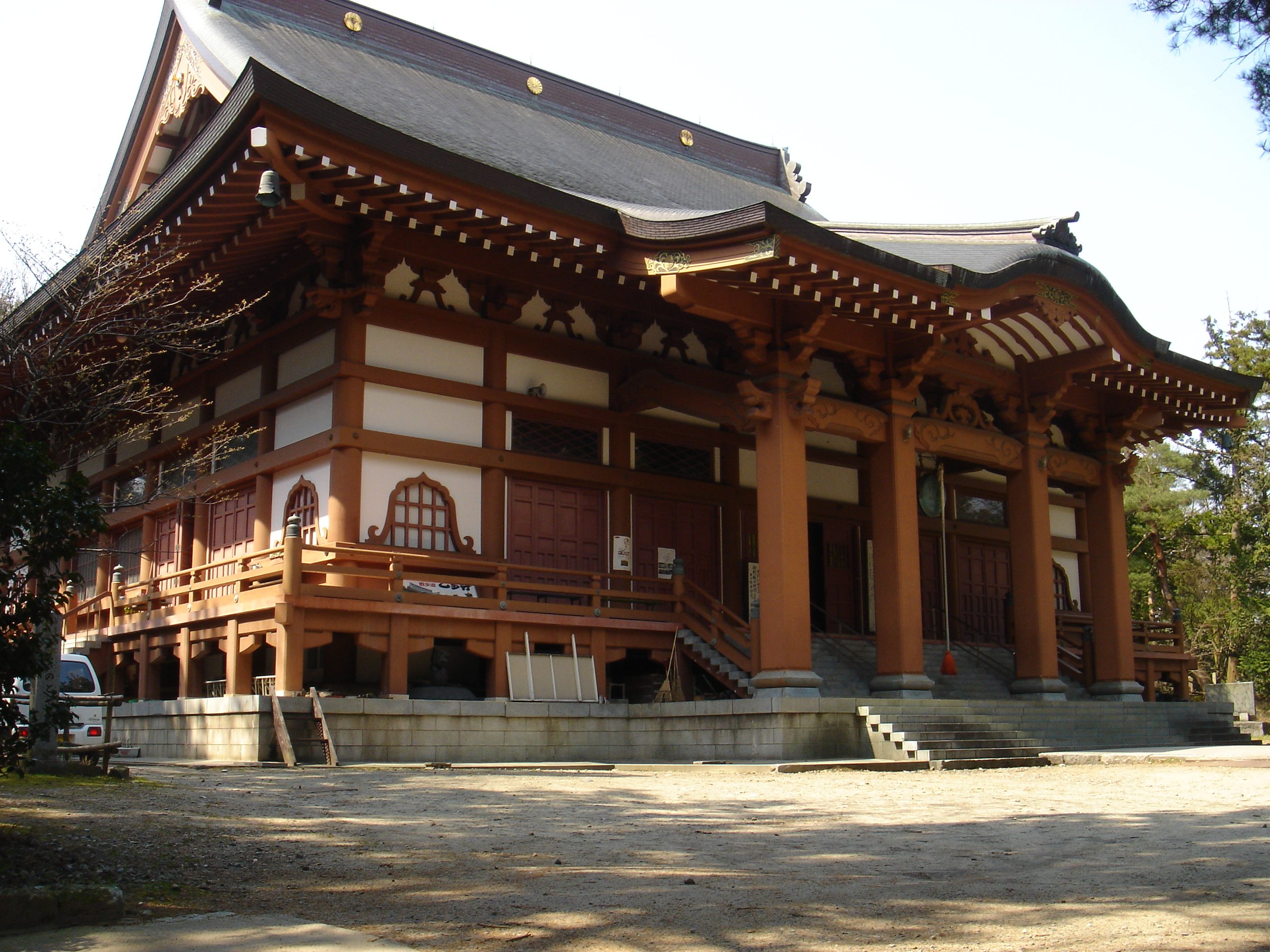
Oppo-ji Temple

- Tossaka Castle ruins, a National Historic Site
- Jōnoyama Kofun, a National Historic Site
- Oppo-ji, a Buddhist temple whose 3-story pagoda is a National Important Cultural Property
