= Echigo-Ishiyama Station =

Railway station in Niigata, Japan

Echigo-Ishiyama Station 越後石山駅
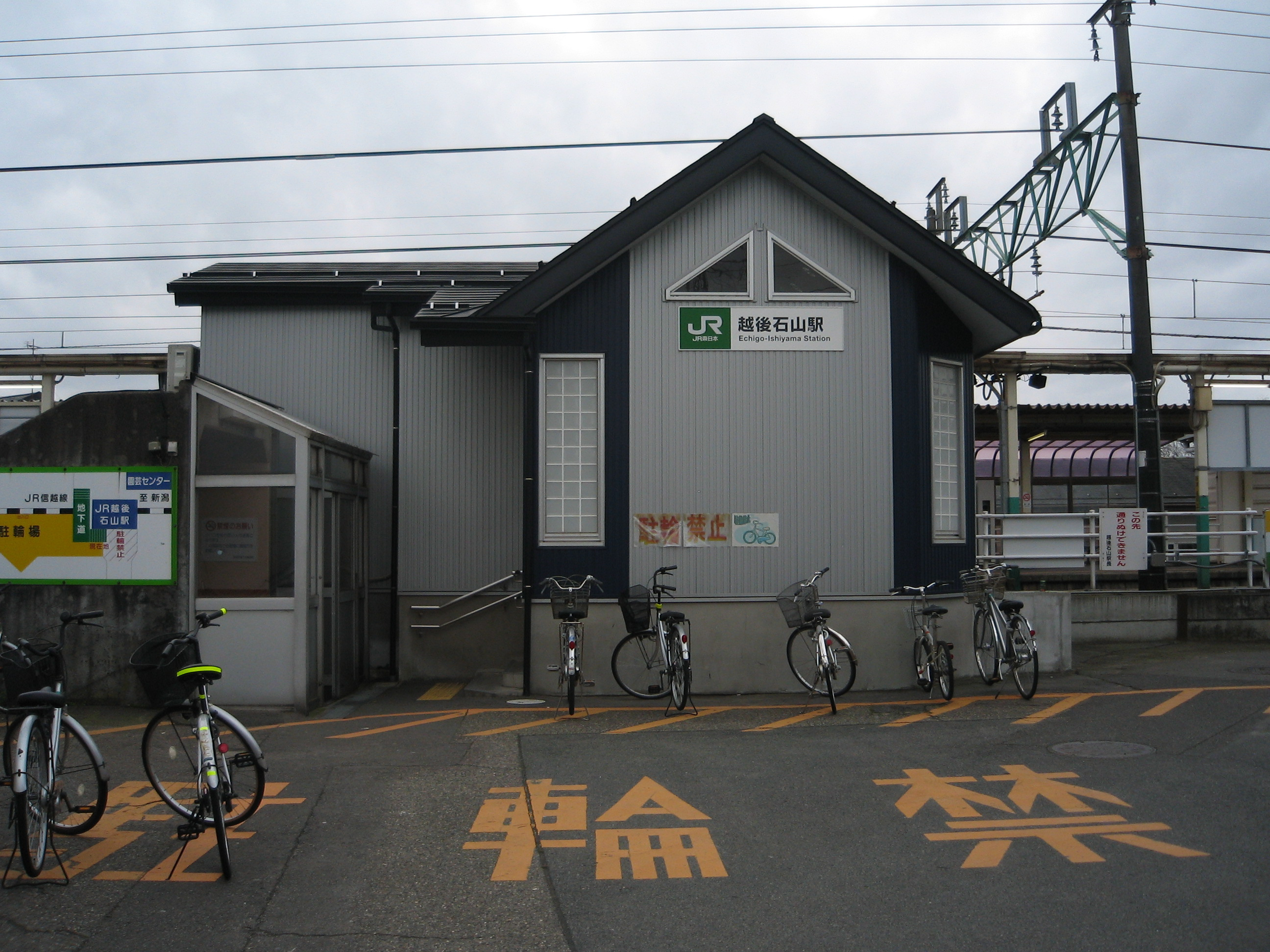
- East side of Echigo-Ishiyama Station in December 2009

General information
- Location: 5 Ishiyama, Higashi-ku, Niigata-shi, Niigata-ken 950-0852; Japan
- Coordinates: 37.8966°N 139.0954°E
- Operator: JR East
- Line: ■ Shin'etsu Main Line
- Distance: 132.2 km from Naoetsu
- Platforms: 2 side platforms
- Tracks: 2

Other information
- Status: Staffed
- Website: Official website

History
- Opened: 1 November 1960; 65 years ago

Passengers
- FY2017: 2,063 daily

Services
| Preceding station | JR East | Following station |
|---|---|---|
| Kameda towards Naoetsu | Shin'etsu Main Line Local | Niigata Terminus |
Location
- Location within JR Shinetsu Main Line Location within Japan

Echigo-Ishiyama Station (越後石山駅, Echigo-Ishiyama-eki) is a train station in Higashi-ku, Niigata, Niigata Prefecture, Japan, operated by East Japan Railway Company (JR East).

== Lines ==
Echigo-Ishiyama Station is served by the Shin'etsu Main Line, and is 132.2 kilometers from the starting point of the line at Naoetsu Station. The station is staffed.

== Layout ==
The station consists of two ground-level opposed side platforms, serving two tracks. There is an underground passage outside the gate.

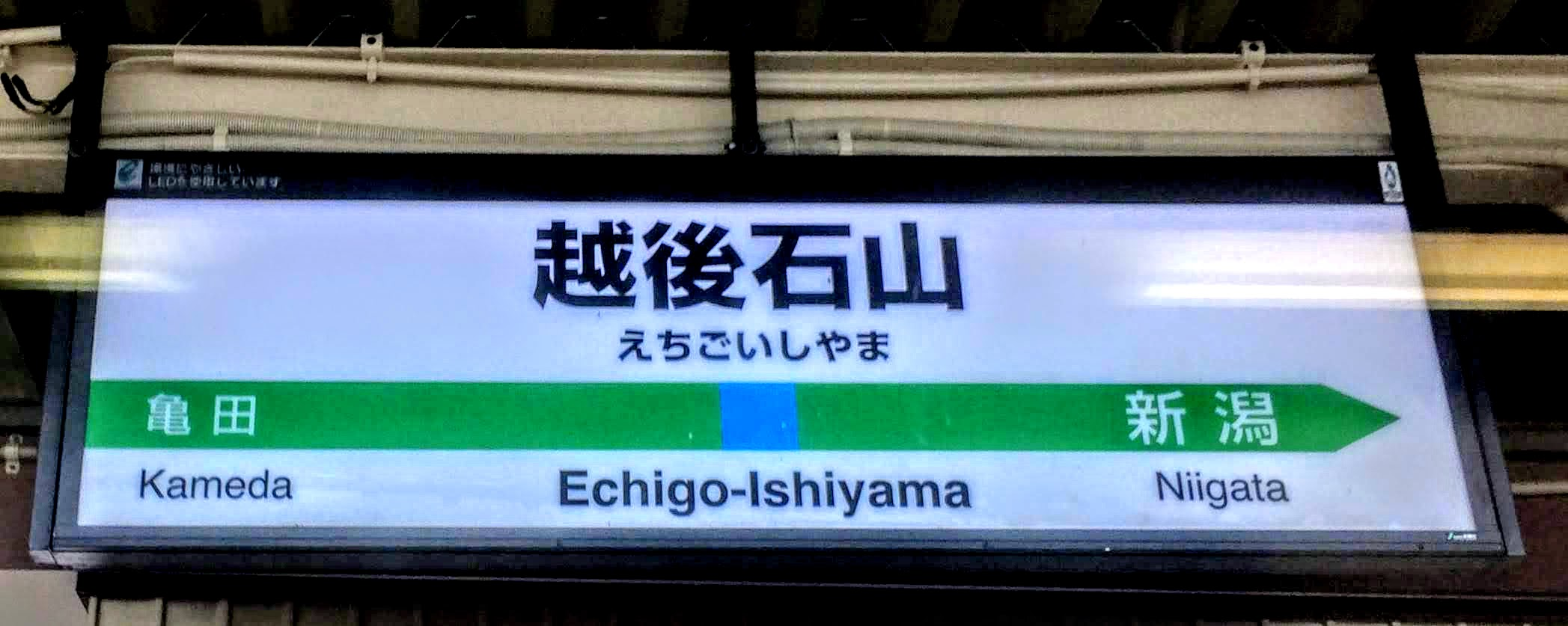
Station Name plate

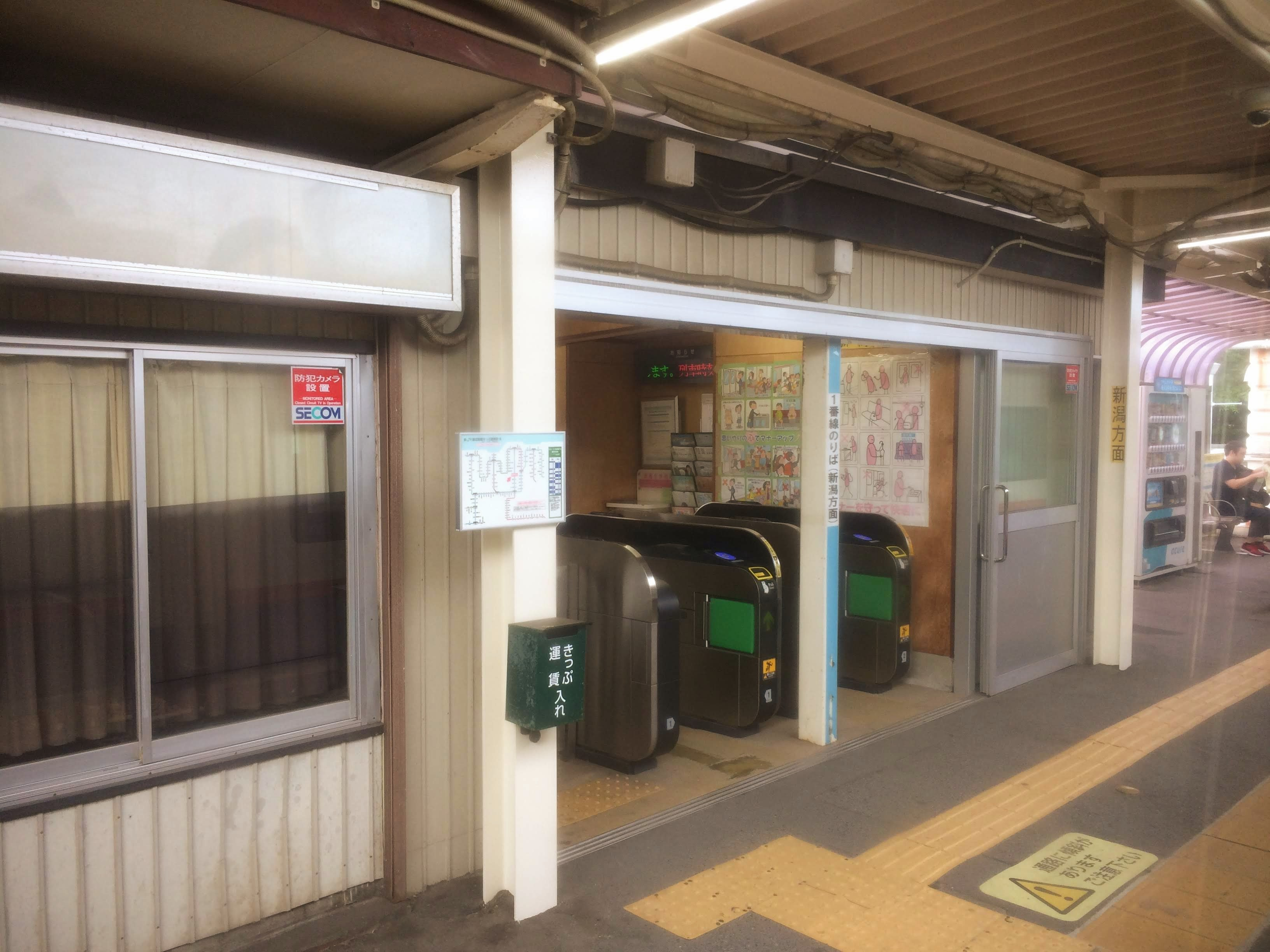
Gate

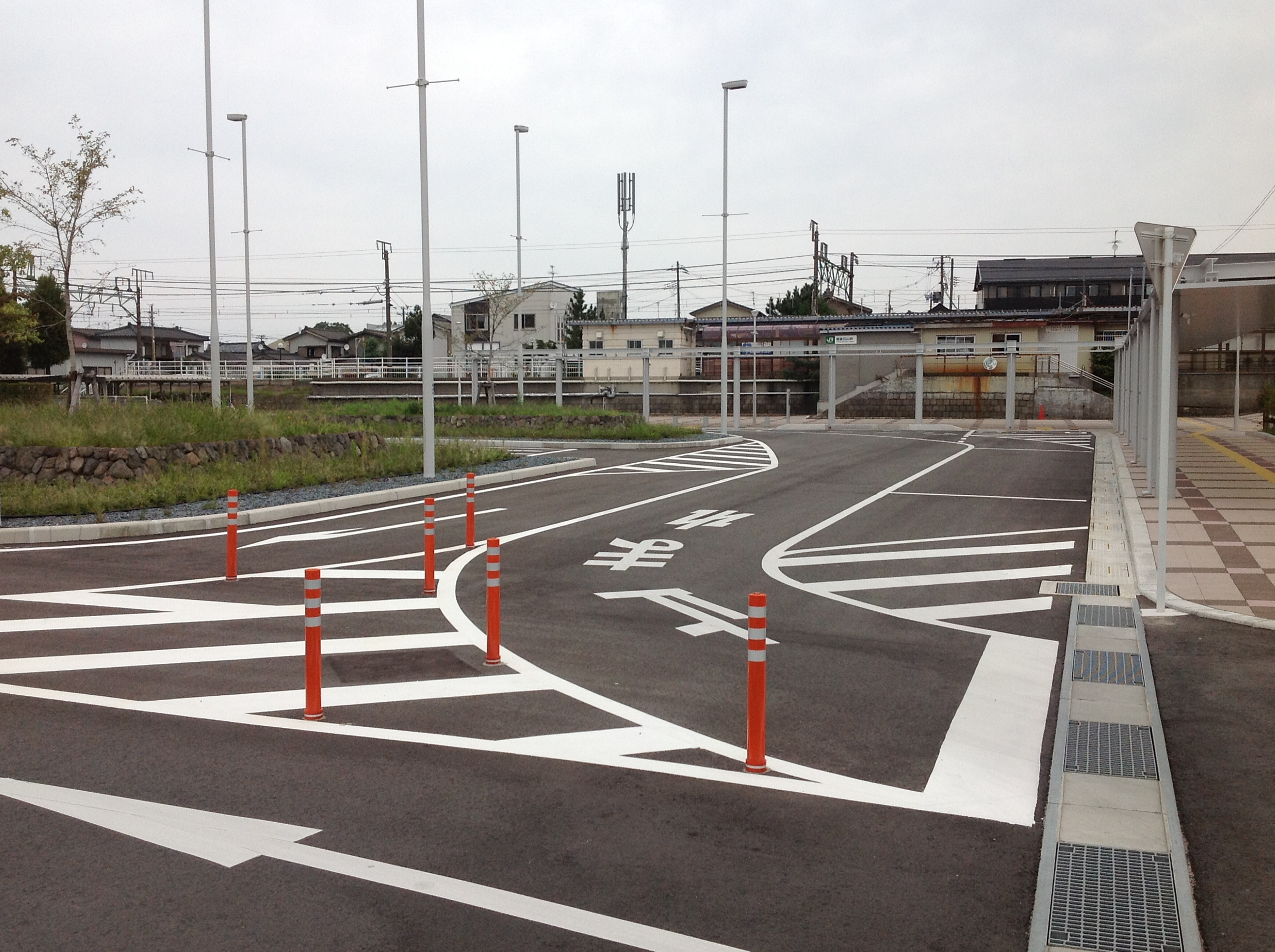
East side（September 2015）

=== Platforms ===
| 1 (West) | ■ Shin'etsu Main Line | for Niigata |
| 2 (East) | ■ Shin'etsu Main Line | for Niitsu, Nagaoka |

== History ==
The station opened on 1 November 1960. With the privatization of Japanese National Railways (JNR) on 1 April 1987, the station came under the control of JR East.

== Passenger statistics ==
In fiscal 2017, the station was used by an average of 2,063 passengers daily (boarding passengers only).

== Surrounding area ==
- Ishiyama Middle School
- Nakanoyama Elementary School

== See also ==
- List of railway stations in Japan
