= Seirō, Niigata =

Seirō 聖籠町
- Town
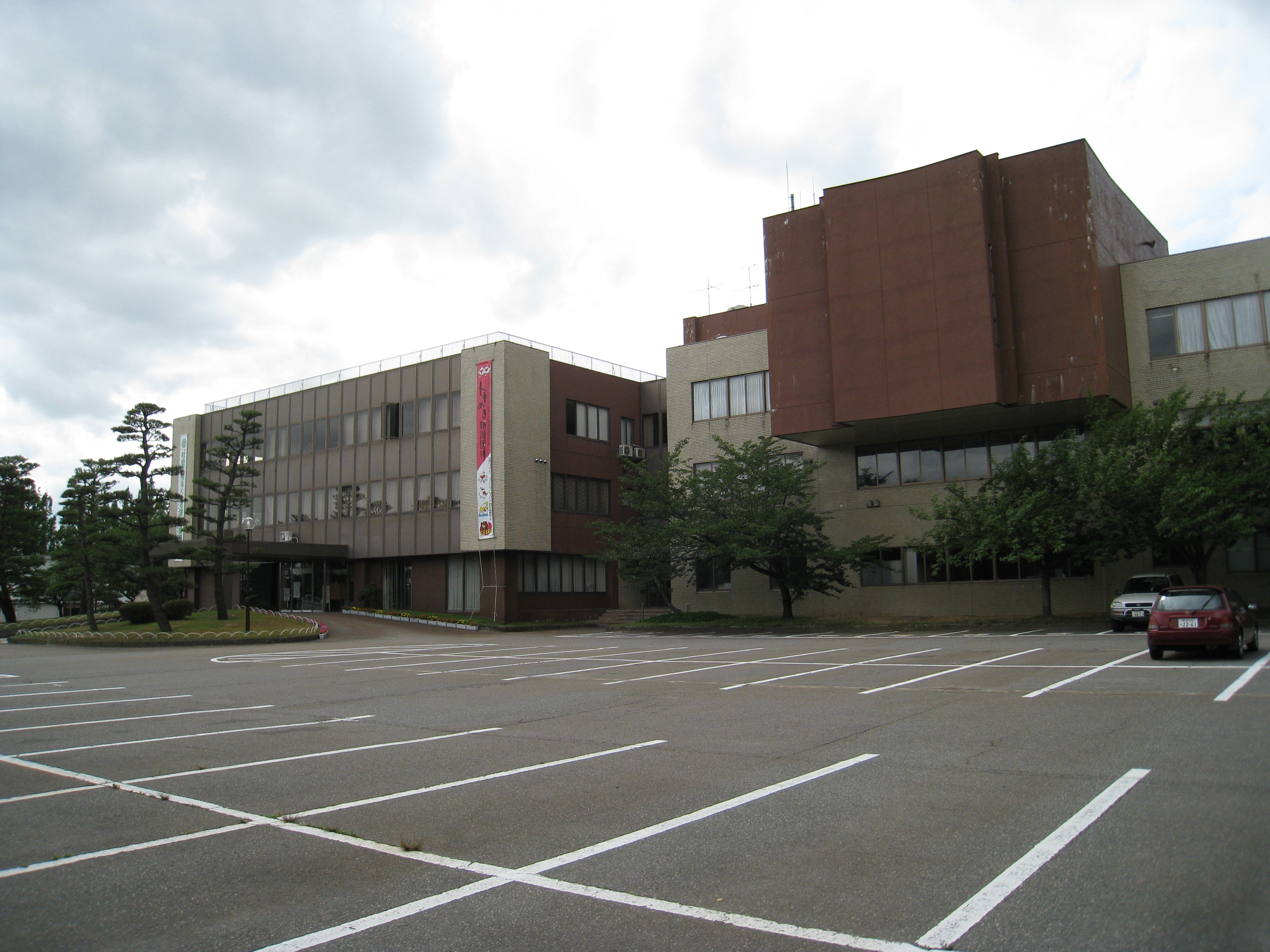
- Seirō town hall

- Flag Seal

- Location of Seirō in Niigata Prefecture

- Coordinates: 37°58′28.3″N 139°16′27.3″E
- Country: Japan
- Region: Chūbu (Kōshin'etsu) (Hokuriku)
- Prefecture: Niigata
- District: Kitakanbara

Area
  - Total: 37.58 km^{2} (14.51 sq mi)

Population (July 1, 2019)
  - Total: 14,025
  - Density: 373.2/km^{2} (966.6/sq mi)
- Time zone: UTC+9 (Japan Standard Time)
- Symbols
  - Tree: Japanese black pine
  - Flower: Rosa rugosa
- Phone number: 0254-27-2111
- Address: 1635-4 Suwayama, Seirō-machi, Kitakanbara-gun, Niigata-ken 957-0192
- Website: Official website

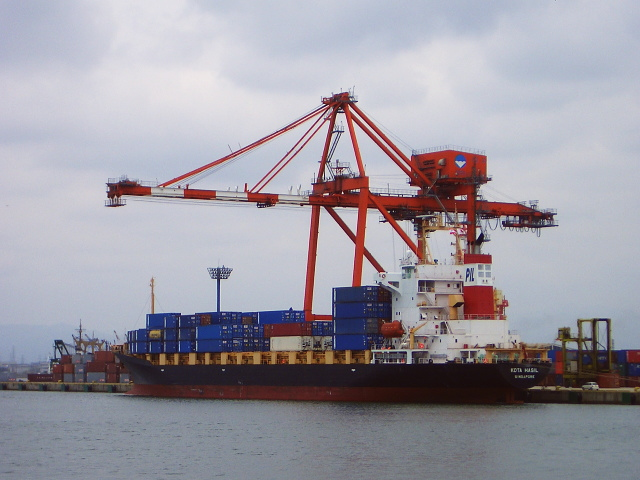
Port of Niigata

Seirō (聖籠町, Seirō-machi) is a town located in Niigata Prefecture, Japan. As of 1 July 2019, the town had an estimated population of 14,025 in 4715 households, and a population density of 373 persons per km^{2}. The total area of the town was 37.58 square kilometres (14.51 sq mi).

== Geography ==
Seirō is located in central Niigata Prefecture, sandwiched between the cities of Niigata and Shibata, with a small coastline on the Sea of Japan.

=== Surrounding municipalities ===
- Niigata Prefecture
  - Kita-ku
  - Shibata

== Climate ==
Seirō has a humid subtropical climate (Köppen Cfa) characterized by warm, wet summers and cold winters with heavy snowfall. The average annual temperature in Seirō is 13.1 °C. The average annual rainfall is 1940 mm with September as the wettest month. The temperatures are highest on average in August, at around 26.3 °C, and lowest in January, at around 1.5 °C.

== Demographics ==
Per Japanese census data, the population of Seirō has grown slightly over the past 50 years.

Historical population
Year	Pop.	±%
1970	11,760	—
1980	12,232	+4.0%
1990	12,290	+0.5%
2000	13,313	+8.3%
2010	13,724	+3.1%
2020	14,259	+3.9%

== History ==
The area of present-day Seirō was part of ancient Echigo Province. After the Meiji restoration, the area was organized as part of Kitakanbara District, Niigata. The village of Seirō was established on April 1, 1889, with the creation of the modern municipalities system. It was raised to town status in August 1977.

== Economy ==
The local economy was formerly dependent on commercial fishing, but is now dominated by industry, notably the production of precision components and food processing. The Higashi-Niigata Thermal Power Station, a large fossil-fuel thermal power station operated by Tohoku Electric, is located in Seirō. The Port of Niigata is a major employer.

== Education ==
Seirō has three public elementary schools and one public middle school operated by the town government. The town does not have a high school.

== Transportation ==
=== Railway ===
- Seirō is not served by any passenger train routes.

=== Highway ===
- Nihonkai-Tōhoku Expressway
- National Route 7
- National Route 113
