= Shiunji, Niigata =

Dissolved municipality in Niigata prefecture, Japan

Shiunji (紫雲寺町, Shiunji-machi) was a town located in Kitakanbara District, Niigata Prefecture, Japan.

== Population ==
As of 2003, the town had an estimated population of 7,840 and a density of 293.63 persons per km^{2}. The total area was 26.70 km^{2}.

== History ==
On May 1, 2005, Shiunji, along with the village of Kajikawa (also from Kitakanbara District), was merged into the expanded city of Shibata.

== Famous residents ==
Shiunji is the hometown of Sasagawa Miwa, a Japanese folk singer. In October 2005 she released a single in honor of her hometown, called "紫雲寺" (Shiunji). The single was available only in Niigata and was limited to only 2,000 copies. The song is also included on her February 2006 album "夜明け" (Yoake) which was sold throughout Japan.
