= Miwa Sasagawa =

Japanese singer-songwriter (born 1983)

Miwa Sasagawa 笹川美和 (Sasagawa Miwa)
- Born: February 23, 1983 (age 43); Shiunji, Niigata, Japan
- Occupation: Singer-songwriter
- Instruments: Vocals, piano
- Years active: 2000–present
- Labels: Paint Box, avex trax, APRILRECORDS, cutting edge
- Website: avexnet.or.jp/sasagawamiwa/

Miwa Sasagawa (笹川 美和, Sasagawa Miwa; born February 23, 1983) is a Japanese singer-songwriter.

== History ==
Miwa was born in Shiunji, Niigata (currently Shibata) and graduated from Niigata Woman's College.

She was influenced by listening to Yumi Matsutoya during elementary school.

In 2000, her original song "Thanks to be here" won the grand prize at the Mos Burger-sponsored Christmas Song Grand Prix. After that, her indie music career began.

On September 18, 2003, her major label debut single "Warai" was released by avex trax.

Her single "Shiunji" (紫雲寺) ranked on the Oricon charts despite being a 2000-copy limited edition available only in Niigata Prefecture.

Her contract with Avex Group expired at the end of July 2007. She continued on as in independent artist after that but in 2012 a new official website appeared on the Avex portal and it was announced she had re-signed with Avex after a 5-year hiatus and that new releases were forthcoming.

== Discography ==
=== Major Label Releases ===
==== Singles ====
- 1st Single: "Warai" (『笑』) (September 18, 2003)
  - Limited to production only during 2003 – Highest Oricon Ranking: 49
  1. "Warai" (笑) – Kirin Beverage Company's 'Koiwai Pure Fruit Juice' TV commercial song
  2. "Negaigoto" (願いごと)
- 2nd Single:"Kinmokusei" (『金木犀』) (October 16, 2003)
  - Limited to production only during 2003 – Highest Oricon Ranking: 82
  1. "Kinmokusei" (金木犀) – TBS's "Atarashii Kaze" (「新しい風」, New Wind) TV show theme song
  2. "Hatsu Shitsuren" (初失恋) – Mos Burger TV commercial song
- Re-released Single: "Kinmokusei/Warai" (『金木犀/笑』) (May 26, 2004)
  - Highest Oricon Ranking: 37
  1. "Kinmokusei" (金木犀) – TBS's "Atarashii Kaze" (「新しい風」, New Wind) TV show theme song
  2. "Warai" (笑) – Kirin Beverage Company's 'Koiwai Pure Fruit Juice' TV commercial song
  3. "Hatsu Shitsuren" (初失恋) – Mos Burger TV commercial song
- 3rd Single: "Anata Atashi" (『あなた あたし』) (August 25, 2004)
  - Highest Oricon Ranking: 99
  1. "Anata Atashi" (あなた あたし) – TBS's "Hitachi Sekai Fushigi Hakken" (「世界・ふしぎ発見!」, Hitachi's Discovery of the World's Mysteries!) ending theme
  2. "Sazukemashou" (さずけましょう)
- 4th Single: "Tomenaide/Utsukushii Kage" (『止めないで/美しい影』) (November 17, 2004)
  - Highest Oricon Ranking: 100
  1. "Tomenaide" (止めないで) – MBS and TBS's "Sekai Ururun Taizaiki" (「世界ウルルン滞在記」, World Ururun: Sojourn Chronicles) ending theme
  2. "Utsukushii Kage" (美しい影)
  3. "Anata Atashi" (あなた あたし) (Solo Performance Version)
- 5th Single: "Himawari" (『向日葵』) (October 5, 2005)
  - Highest Oricon Ranking: 144
  1. "Himawari" (向日葵) – NHK's Cancer Support Campaign song
  2. "Mimi" (みみ)
- 6th Single: Nigata Limited Edition "Shiunji" (『紫雲寺』) (October 26, 2005)
  - Limited to 2000 copies available only in Nigata – Highest Oricon Ranking: 191
  1. "Shiunji" (紫雲寺)
- 7th Single: "Izanai" (『誘い』) (January 11, 2006)
  - Highest Oricon Ranking: 162
  1. "Izanai" (誘い)
  2. "Amanojaku" (天邪鬼)
- 8th Single: "Oboro Zukiyo/Kako" (『朧月夜/過去』) (August 30, 2006)
  1. "Oboro Zukiyo" (朧月夜)
  2. "Kako" (過去)
  3. "Ansokujitsu" (安息日)
- 9th Single: "Mayoinaku" (『迷いなく』) (November 8, 2006)
  1. "Mayoinaku" (迷いなく) – TV Asahi's 'Selection X' ending theme
  2. "Kaisha" (海砂)

==== Albums ====
- 1st Album: "Jijitsu" (『事実』) (November 19, 2003)
  - Major Debut Album – Highest Oricon Ranking: 30
  1. "Jijitsu" (事実)
  2. "Taiyou" (太陽)
  3. "Hokuro" (黒子)
  4. "Douzo" (どうぞ)
  5. "Kami" (髪)
  6. "Warai" (笑)
  7. "Uishenma" (为什么)
  8. "Kinmokusei" (金木犀)
  9. "Tonneru" (隧道)
  10. "Tsukusu" (尽くす)
  11. "Naraba" (ならば)
  12. "Tadatada" (ただただ)
- 2nd Album: "Amata" (『数多』) (January 19, 2005)
  - Highest Oricon Ranking: 21
  1. "Amata" (数多)
  2. "Anata Atashi" (あなた あたし)
  3. "Kiri" (霧)
  4. "Tomonaide" (止めないで)
  5. "Yuitsu no Mono" (唯一のもの)
  6. "Gotoku" (ごとく)
  7. "Kousui" (香水)
  8. "Megami" (女神)
  9. "Saki" (先)
  10. "Mouja" (亡者)
  11. "Utsukushii Kage" (美しい影)
  12. "Hachimitsu" (蜂蜜)
  13. "Toki" (時)
- 3rd Album: "Yoake" (『夜明け』) (February 22, 2006)
  - Highest Oricon Ranking: 82
  1. "Yoake" (夜明け)
  2. "Himawari" (向日葵)
  3. "Irimasen ka" (いりませんか) – Komezou (米蔵) Shōchū TV commercial song (aired in the Touhoku region)
  4. "Nagareboshi" (流れ星)
  5. "Kikyou" (桔梗)
  6. "Midori" (緑)
  7. "Nagashite Shimaou" (流してしまおう)
  8. "Mujou" (無情)
  9. "Izanai" (誘い)
  10. "Yadoru na" (宿るな)
  11. "Hikari to ha" (光とは)
  12. "Shiunji" (紫雲寺)
- 4th Album:"Mayoinaku" (『まよいなく』) (March 7, 2007)
  1. "Mayoinaku" (迷いなく)
  2. "Yukigumo" (雪雲)
  3. "Koorizatou" (氷砂糖)
  4. "Tsubomi" (蕾)
  5. "Eguri Dashite" (えぐり出して)
  6. "Kako" (過去)
  7. "Hime Ringo" (姫林檎)
  8. "Oboro Zukiyo" (朧月夜)
  9. "Wasurenaide Ite" (忘れないでいて)
  10. "Kageboshi" (影法師)
  11. "Haishaku" (拝借)
  12. "Suki na You ni" (好きな様に)
- Mini Album: "Orokana Negai" (『愚かな願い』) (August 29, 2012 – Originally planned for release on June 27)
  1. "Orokana Negai" (愚かな願い)
  2. "Sore wo Shiranai" (それを知らない)
  3. "NY ni te" (NYにて)
  4. "Maryoku" (魔力)
  5. "Anemone" (アネモネ)
  6. "Kazoku no Fuukei" (家族の風景)
- Mini Album: "Machi no Akari" (『都会の灯(まちのあかり)』) (January 16, 2013)
  1. "Gozen Yoji Sanjuuroppun" (午前4時36分)
  2. "Machi no Akari" (都会の灯)
  3. "Purizumu" (プリズム)
  4. "Harete Kuru Darou" (晴れてくるだろう)
  5. "Naitatte" (泣いたって)
  6. "Kyou" (今日)
- 7th Album: "Soshite Taiyou no Hikari wo" (『そして太陽の光を』) (January 15, 2014)
  1. "Arashi no Mae no Shizukesa" (嵐の前の静けさ)
  2. "Renge no Hana" (蓮華の花)
  3. "Soshite Taiyou no Hikari wo" (そして太陽の光を)
  4. "Ano Basho he" (あの場所へ)
  5. "Haru no Yume" (春の夢)
  6. "Toga" (咎)
  7. "Gotsugou Shugi" (ご都合主義)
  8. "Katsubou" (渇望)
  9. "Ijiwaru" (いじわる)
  10. "Kokoro Shidai" (こころ次第)

=== Indie Releases ===
- Single X'mos with Smile Two Song Collection (December 1, 2000 – Out of Print)
  - Miwa Sasagawa – "Thanks to be here"
  - THE – "Seinaru Yoru wo Kimi to..." (「聖なる夜を君と・・・。」)
- 1st Single: "Himawari" (『向日葵』) (April 5, 2001 – Out of Print)
- Mini Album: "Oukoku" (『黄黒』) (October 6, 2001 – Out of Print)
- 2nd Single: "Kinmokusei/Warai" (『金木犀/笑』) (June 29, 2002 – Out of Print)
- 3rd Single: "Taiyou" (『太陽』) (April 6, 2003 – Out of Print)
  - DVD included
- Mini Album: miwa BLUE (June 6, 2008)
  - Includes a recording of "Machiumare, Inakaumare" (「街生まれ、田舎生まれ」). Available only at live events and on the APRILRECORDS online store.
- Mini Album: miwa NOEL (November 27, 2008 – Sold Out)
  - 1000 copy limited press (APRILRECORDS)
- 5th Album: miwa MIRAGE (May 8, 2009)
  - Included two bonus tracks
- Mini Album: miwaTALE (June 23, 2010)
  - Concept CD. The limited quantity miwaTALE limited pre-order edition came in a string tie envelope with special letterpress lyric cards.
- 6th Album: miwaGLITTER (November 17, 2010)

=== Filmography ===
- Indie Music Video Collection VHS Tape: HIMAWARI (November 2002)
  - Sold at live shows and on her Official Site (limited to 200 copies)

== Public Performances ==
=== Radio ===
- "Sasagawa Miwa no Ooru Naito Nippon" (笹川美和のオールナイトニッポン, Miwa Sasagawa's All Night Japan) (October 2004 – March 25, 2005; March 3, 2006; August 25, 2012) Saturdays, 1:00 am – 3:00 am on Nippon Broadcasting System

=== Theater ===
- +GOLD FISH (February 7–26, 2013, Tokyo Metropolitan Theatre)

== Other ==
- Her father operated his own civil engineering and construction company called Sasagawa Group Co., Ltd. So, Miwa was in fact the daughter of a company president. Incidentally, the company produced an original Japanese hand towel in collaboration with the release of the song, "Utsukushii Kage" (「美しい影」).
- "Warai" (「笑」), which could be called her seminal hit, was written for her cousin.
- She was pen pals with Masayuki Kishima, the mayor of Shiunji, since before her major label debut.
- She was the host of All Night Nippon when the 2004 Chūetsu earthquake occurred. Since Miwa herself lives in Niigata, she received a lot of e-mails and postcards of encouragement from listeners. She was quite moved and, in spite of herself, actually cried during the show. Fortunately, the earthquake was relatively weak in her home area of Shiunji and it received almost no damage. However, she did say during the show that she was forced to travel by air due to the Joetsu Shinkansen being impassable.
- She made a guest appearance at INORAN's Tour Final 2007 (Part One) on October 6, 2007, at Nakano Sun Plaza. She sang 3 songs from INORAN's first album "Sou" (「想」) and her own song "Koorizatou" (「氷砂糖」), which was produced by INORAN and H.Hayama, as well as two unreleased songs.
- On December 29, 2008, she appeared at INORAN's Connectivity live show at Shibuya's duo MUSIC EXCHANGE live venue. She sang "Resolution", "Monsoon Baby," "Koorizatou" (「氷砂糖」), and "Machiumare, Inakaumare" (「街生まれ、田舎生まれ」).
- As the lone host of All Night Nippon, she would often suddenly begin speaking in an angry sounding tone as if she had lost her temper. Even her tagline in the show's commercial was her angrily saying, "Do I sound mad?!"
- She appeared again as the host of All Night Nippon on August 25, 2012, about 6 years and 5 months since her last appearance. During the show she talked about her father's company no longer existing and said that she was no longer the daughter of a company president.
