= Kameda Station =

Railway station in Niigata, Japan

Kameda Station 亀田駅
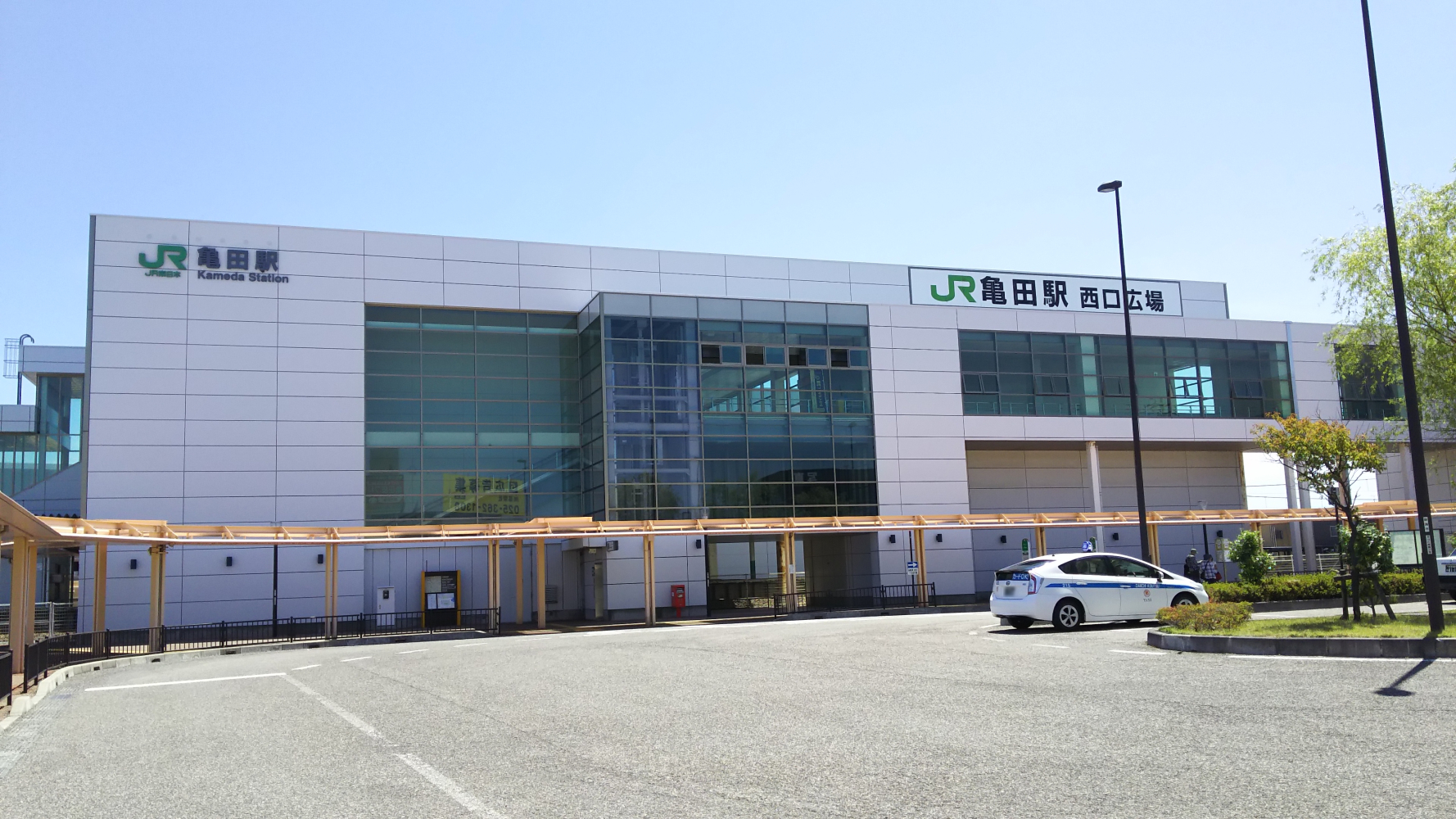
- West side of Kameda Station, June 2018

General information
- Location: 1-Chome Higashifunaba, Kōnan-ku, Niigata-shi, Niigata-ken 950-0163; Japan
- Coordinates: 37.8769°N 139.1079°E
- Operator: JR East
- Line: Shin'etsu Main Line
- Distance: 129.8 km (80.7 mi) from Naoetsu
- Platforms: 1 island platform
- Tracks: 2

Construction
- Structure type: At grade

Other information
- Status: Staffed ("Midori no Madoguchi")
- Website: Official website

History
- Opened: 20 November 1897; 128 years ago

Passengers
- FY2017: 5,378 daily

Services
Preceding station	JR East	Following station
Niitsu towards Naoetsu	Shin'etsu Main Line Rapid	Niigata Terminus
Ogikawa towards Naoetsu	Shin'etsu Main Line Local	Echigo-Ishiyama towards Niigata
Location
- Location within JR Shinetsu Main Line Location within Japan

Kameda Station (亀田駅, Kameda-eki) is a train station in Kōnan-ku, Niigata, Niigata Prefecture, Japan, operated by East Japan Railway Company (JR East).

== Lines ==
Kameda Station is served by the Shin'etsu Main Line, and is 129.8 kilometers from the starting point of the line at Naoetsu.

== Layout ==
The station consists of a ground-level island platform, serving two tracks, with the station situated above the tracks. The station has a "Midori no Madoguchi" staffed ticket office.

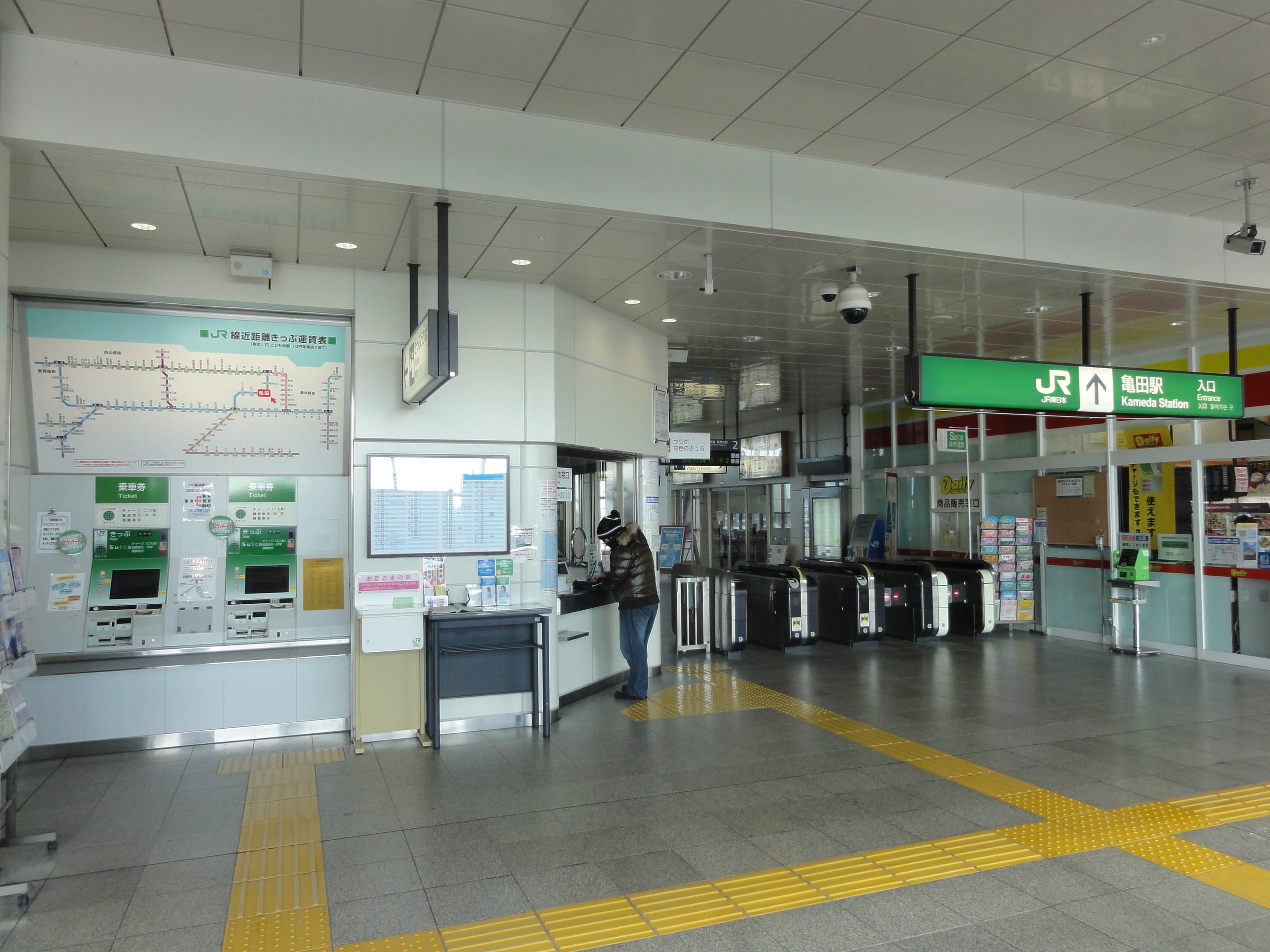
Gate (December 2011)

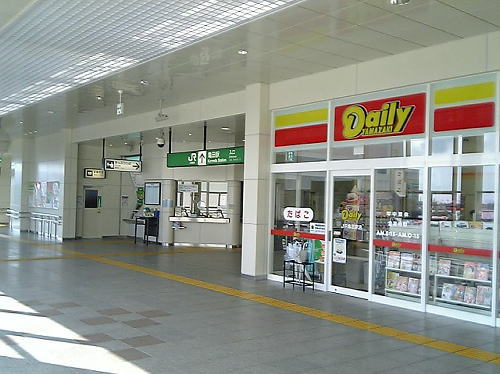
Shop (February 2006)

=== Platforms ===
1	■ Shin'etsu Main Line	for Niigata
2	■ Shin'etsu Main Line	for Niitsu, Nagaoka

== History ==
The station opened on 20 November 1897. With the privatization of Japanese National Railways (JNR) on 1 April 1987, the station came under the control of JR East.

== Passenger statistics ==
In fiscal 2017, the station was used by an average of 5,378 passengers daily (boarding passengers only).

== Surrounding area ==
- Niigata Kōyō High School
- Niigata Meikun Junior and Senior High School
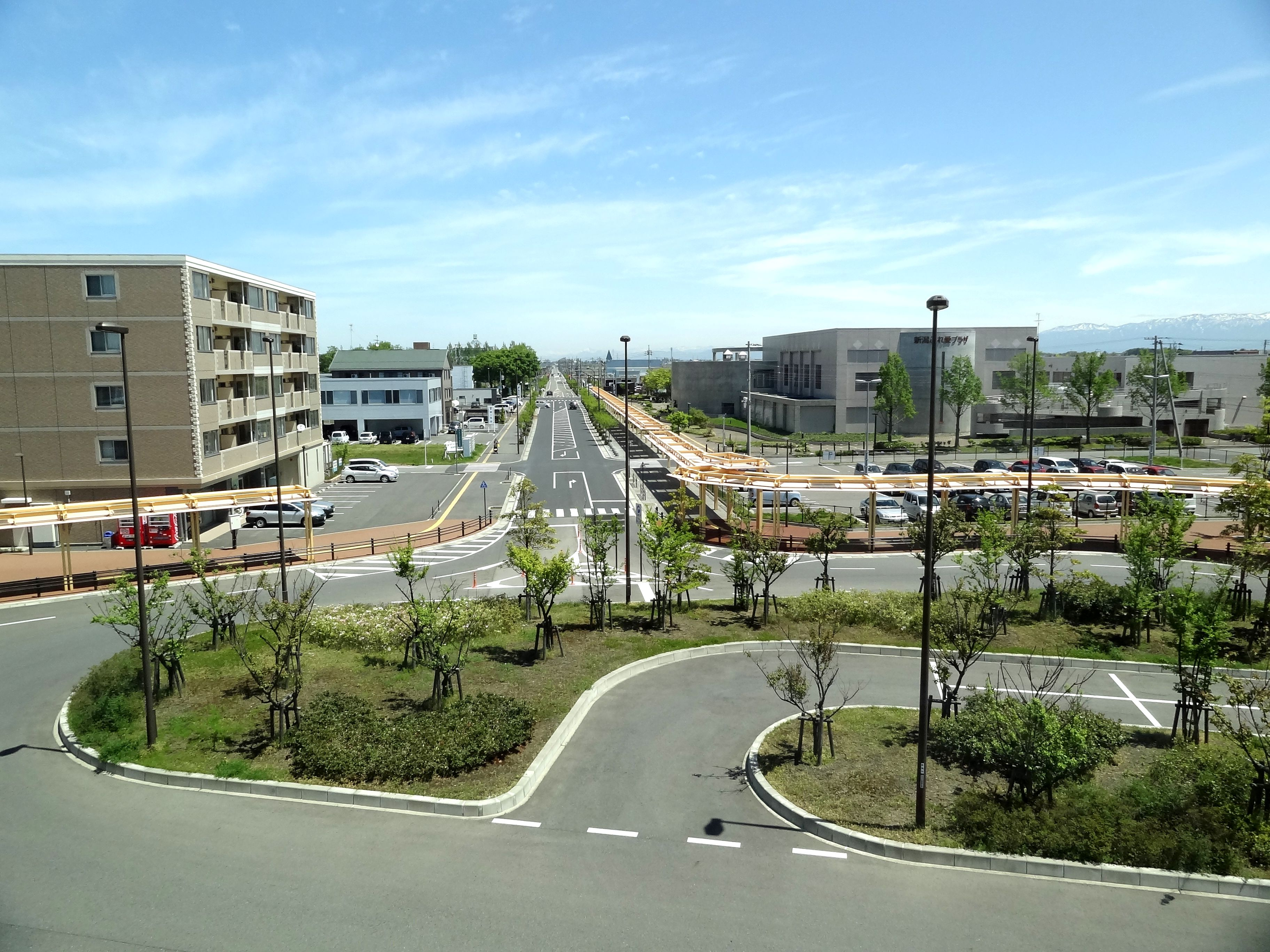
View from east exit

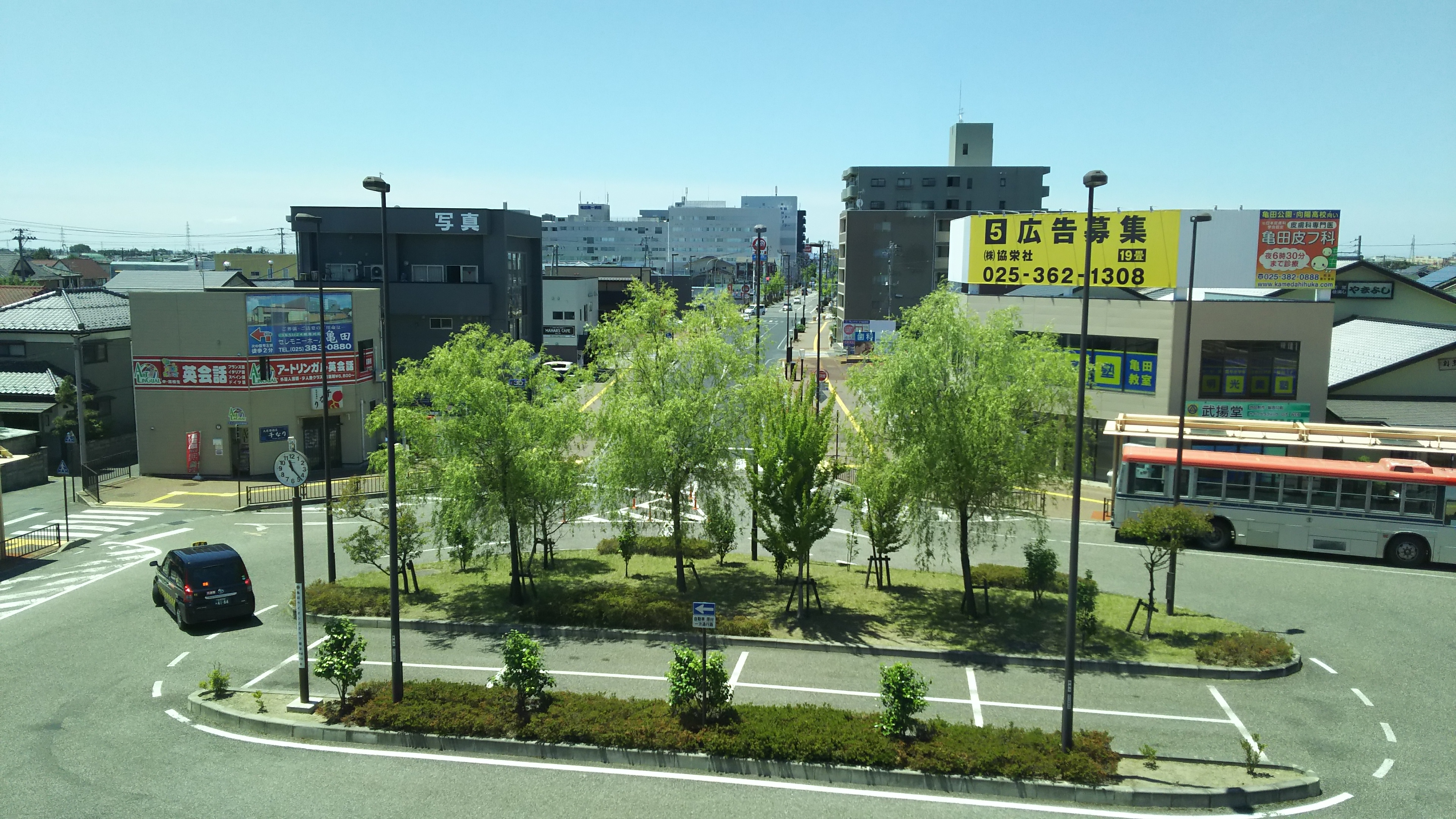
View from west exit (June 2018)

== See also ==
- List of railway stations in Japan
