= Kajikawa, Niigata =

Dissolved municipality in Niigata prefecture, Japan

Kajikawa (加治川村, Kajikawa-mura) was a village located in Kitakanbara District, Niigata Prefecture, Japan.

As of 2003, the village had an estimated population of 7,190 and a density of 196.56 persons per km^{2}. The total area was 36.58 km^{2}.

On May 1, 2005, Kajikawa, along with the town of Shiunji (also from Kitakanbara District), was merged into the expanded city of Shibata.
