= Kurokawa, Niigata =

Dissolved municipality in Niigata prefecture, Japan

Kurokawa (黒川村, Kurokawa-mura) was a village located in Kitakanbara District, Niigata Prefecture, Japan. Kurokawa is now part of the newly created city of Tainai.

As of 2003, the village had an estimated population of 6,577 and a density of 36.42 persons per km^{2}. The total area was 180.60 km^{2}.

On September 1, 2005, Kurokawa, along with the town of Nakajō (also from Kitakanbara District), was merged to create the city of Tainai. Tainai City has a population of approximately 33,000.
