= Nakajō, Niigata =

Dissolved municipality in Niigata prefecture, Japan

Nakajō (中条町, Nakajō-machi) was a town located in Kitakanbara District, Niigata Prefecture, Japan. Nakajō is now part of the newly created city of Tainai.

As of 2003, the town had an estimated population of 27,026 and a density of 319.53 persons per km^{2}. The total area was 84.58 km^{2}.

The town mascot was named "Lippal".

On September 1, 2005, Nakajō, along with the village of Kurokawa (also from Kitakanbara District), was merged to create the city of Tainai. Tainai City has a population of approximately 33,000.

Nakajo was the home of a Southern Illinois University Carbondale branch campus until late 2006, when the NSG (Niigata Sogo Gakuin) Group, which bought out the school, decided to close the program. The buildings have since become a very small school for high school and college English majors.

== Climate ==
Climate data for Nakajō, Niigata (1981-2010)
Month	Jan	Feb	Mar	Apr	May	Jun	Jul	Aug	Sep	Oct	Nov	Dec	Year
Mean daily maximum °C (°F)	4.8 (40.6)	5.3 (41.5)	9.3 (48.7)	16.5 (61.7)	21.5 (70.7)	25.1 (77.2)	28.6 (83.5)	31.0 (87.8)	26.5 (79.7)	20.5 (68.9)	14.1 (57.4)	8.4 (47.1)	17.6 (63.7)
Daily mean °C (°F)	2.1 (35.8)	2.1 (35.8)	5.1 (41.2)	11.3 (52.3)	16.4 (61.5)	20.5 (68.9)	24.3 (75.7)	26.2 (79.2)	21.8 (71.2)	15.8 (60.4)	10.0 (50.0)	5.1 (41.2)	13.4 (56.1)
Mean daily minimum °C (°F)	−0.6 (30.9)	−0.8 (30.6)	1.3 (34.3)	6.3 (43.3)	11.7 (53.1)	16.5 (61.7)	20.7 (69.3)	22.3 (72.1)	18.0 (64.4)	11.7 (53.1)	6.1 (43.0)	2.1 (35.8)	9.6 (49.3)
Average precipitation mm (inches)	255.2 (10.05)	166.1 (6.54)	134.0 (5.28)	114.9 (4.52)	131.5 (5.18)	148.7 (5.85)	212.4 (8.36)	164.0 (6.46)	172.0 (6.77)	199.4 (7.85)	260.7 (10.26)	273.6 (10.77)	2,232.5 (87.89)
Mean monthly sunshine hours	33.7	52.7	104.1	164.1	188.2	167.4	159.9	202.0	139.7	125.8	70.8	41.1	1,449.5
Source: Japan Meteorological Agency
