= Tainaigawa Dam =

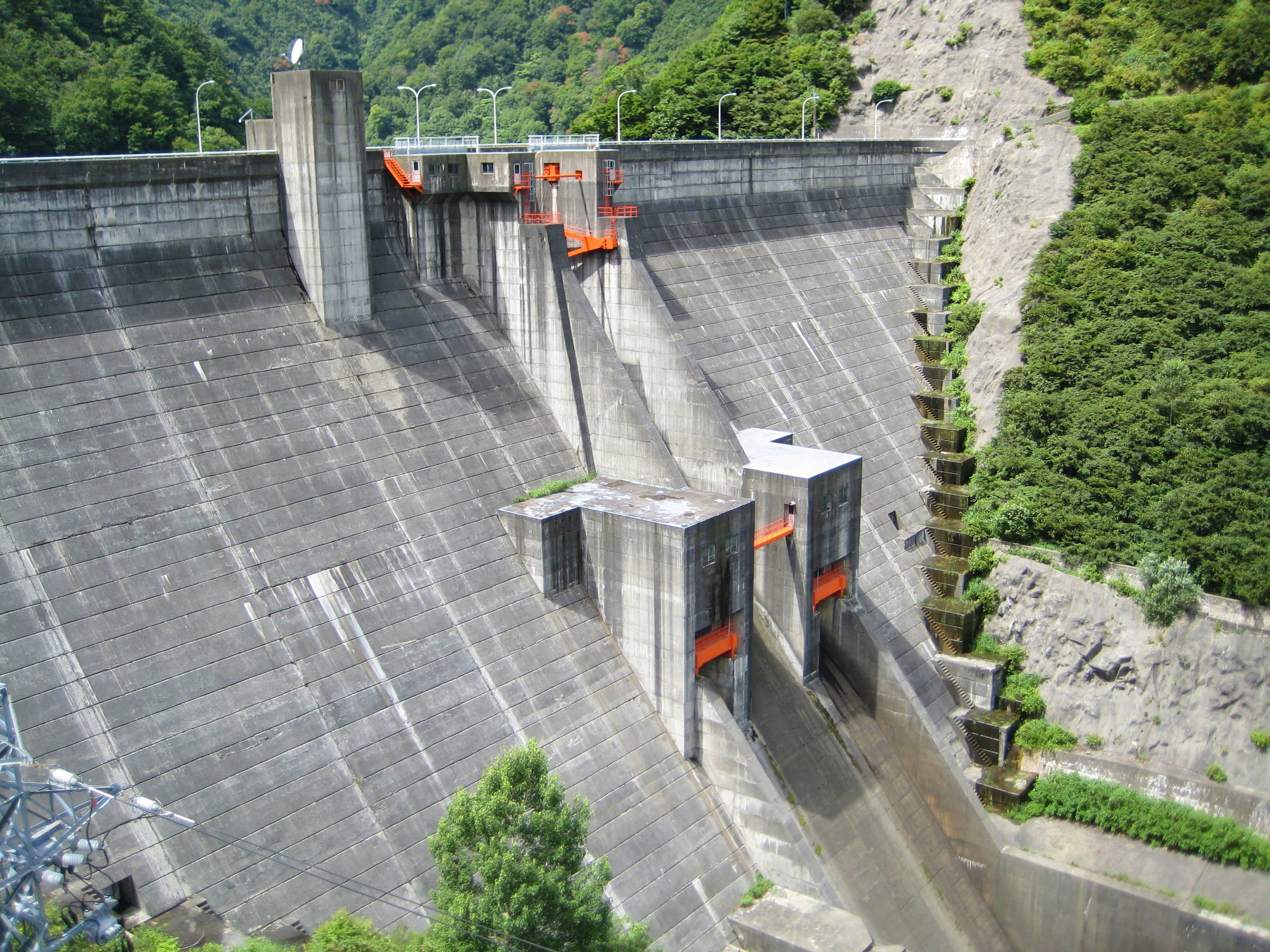
- Interactive map of Tainaigawa Dam
- Location: Tainai, Niigata, Japan
- Coordinates: 37°57′38″N 139°32′12″E
- Construction began: 1967
- Opening date: 1976

Dam and spillways
- Type of dam: concrete gravity dam
- Impounds: Tainai River
- Height: 93.0 m (305.1 ft)
- Length: 215.0 m (705.4 ft)
- Dam volume: 17,100,000 M3

Reservoir
- Catchment area: 72.2 km2
- Surface area: 68 ha

Power Station
- Annual generation: 2000 KW

Tainaigawa Dam (胎内川ダム) is a dam in Tainai, Niigata, Japan, completed in 1976. It is a gravity-type concrete dam aiming for flood control and unspecified water intake. It is 93 meters in height.

== History ==
The small and medium river refurbishment project was started in 1949 on the Tessouchi River flowing through Wessai City. As a result, levees capable of withstanding a flood of 700 cubic meters per second. However, the levees were broke due to flood damage in July, 1966. As a result, dam construction began.
