= Niigata Thermal Power Station =

Power station in Niigata, Japan

Niigata Thermal Power Station 新潟火力発電所
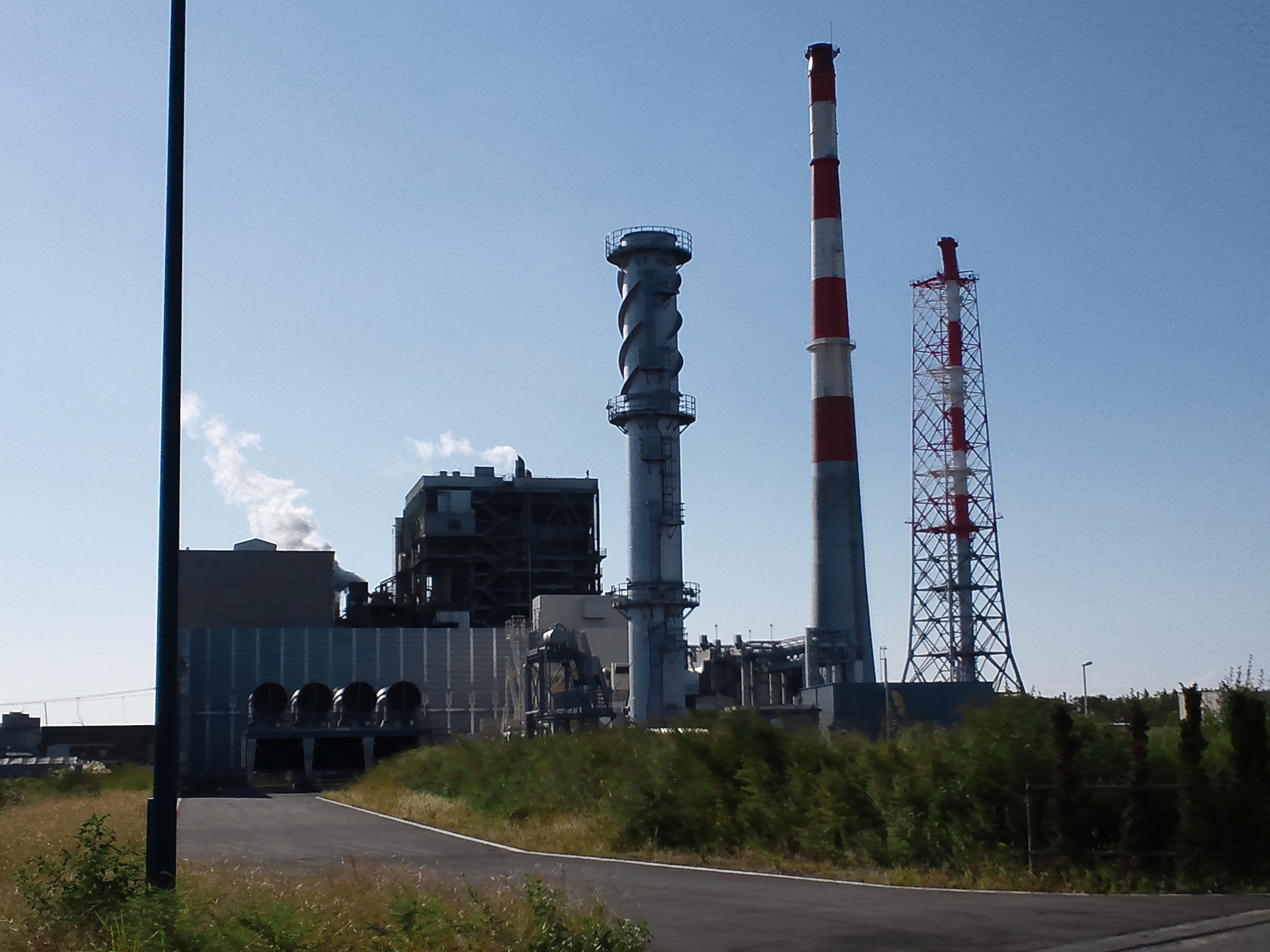
- Niigata Thermal Power Station
- Country: Japan
- Location: Niigata, Niigata Prefecture, Japan
- Coordinates: 37°56′45″N 139°04′53″E
- Status: Operational
- Commission date: 2011
- Owner: Tohoku Electric
- Operator: Tohoku Electric Power

Thermal power station
- Primary fuel: LNG

Power generation
- Units operational: 1
- Units decommissioned: 6
- Nameplate capacity: 1090 MW

Niigata Thermal Power Station (新潟火力発電所, Niigata Karyoku Hatsudensho) is an LNG-fired thermal power station operated by Tohoku Electric in the city of Niigata, Japan. The facility is located on the Sea of Japan coast.

== History ==
The Niigata Thermal Power Station Unit 1 started operation in July 1963. At that time, it was Japan's first power plant capable of using a mixture of natural gas and heavy oil. A total of four units were constructed between 1963 and 1969. Unit 2 was abolished in 1983 and Unit 1 in 1984 due to obsolescence. Plans for a lifetime extension on Unit 3 were cancelled in 2006 and the plant was abolished in 2009.

Unit 5, which adopted a high-efficiency combined cycle power generation system was under construction at the time of the 2011 Tōhoku earthquake and tsunami and came on line from July 30, 2011.

Due to the electrical shortfall in the aftermath of the earthquake, Unit 6 was constructed as an emergency generation station, and came on line on January 31, 2012. It was taken offline on March 21, 2015, after alternative and lower cost sources of energy came on line and infrastructure damaged by the earthquake was repaired.

Unit 4 was abolished in September 2018.

In the past, the Niigata Thermal Power Station used natural gas sent by a 251-kilometre (156 mi) pipeline from the Aga-oki oil and gas field, which was located offshore. It now uses imported liquefied natural gas (LNG).

== Plant details ==
Unit	Fuel	Type	Capacity	On line	Status
1	Heavy Oil / LNG	Steam turbine	125 MW	1963	Decommissioned 1984; scrapped
2	Heavy Oil / LNG	Steam turbine	125 MW	1963	Decommissioned 1983; scrapped
3	Heavy Oil / LNG	Steam turbine	250 MW	1969	Decommissioned 2009; scrapped
4	Heavy Oil / LNG	Steam turbine	250 MW	1969	Decommissioned 2018; scrapped
5-1	LNG	ACC	545 MW	2011	operational
5-2	LNG	ACC	545 MW	2011	operational
6r	LNG	Gas Turbine	34 MW	2012	Decommissioned 2015; scrapped

== See also ==
- Energy in Japan
- List of power stations in Japan
