= Kitakanbara District, Niigata =

District in Niigata prefecture, Japan

Coordinates: 37.9810°N 139.264°E

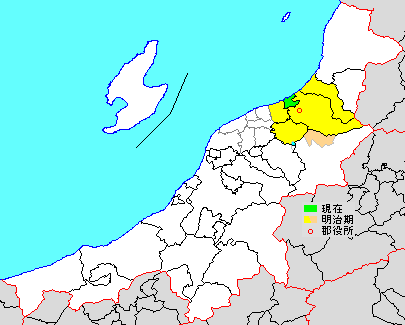
Map showing original extent of Kitakanbara District in Niigata Prefecture: * yellow - areas formerly within the district borders during the early Meiji period * green - current borders: 1. Seirō-machi

Kitakanbara (北蒲原郡, Kitakanbara-gun) is a district located in Niigata Prefecture, Japan.

As of July 1, 2019, the district has an estimated population of 14,025 with a density of 373 persons per km^{2}. The total area is 37.58 km^{2}.

== Municipalities ==
The district consists of only one town:

- Seirō (Note: Classified as a town.)

== History ==
=== District timeline ===
- On January 1, 1947 - The town of Shibata became a city.
- In March 1955 - After it gained city status, Shibata absorbed the villages of Izumino (Ijimino or Ijikuni), Kawahigashi, Sugaya (Sugatani), Matsuura, Yonekura and Akatani (Agaya).
- In March 1956 - Some areas of the village of Kajikawa were absorbed into Shibata.
- In April 1959 - The village of Sasaki was absorbed into Shibata.
- On November 1, 1970 - The town of Toyosaka (part of Niigata as of March 21, 2005) gained city status.

=== Recent mergers ===
- On July 7, 2003 - The town of Toyoura was merged into the expanded city of Shibata.
- On April 1, 2004 - The towns of Suibara and Yasuda, and the villages of Kyogase and Sasakami were merged to form the city of Agano.
- On May 1, 2005 - The town of Shiunji and the village of Kajikawa were also merged into the expanded city of Shibata.
- On September 1, 2005 - The town of Nakajō and the village of Kurokawa were merged to form the city of Tainai.
