= Nakajō Station =

Railway station in Tainai, Niigata Prefecture, Japan

Nakajō Station 中条駅
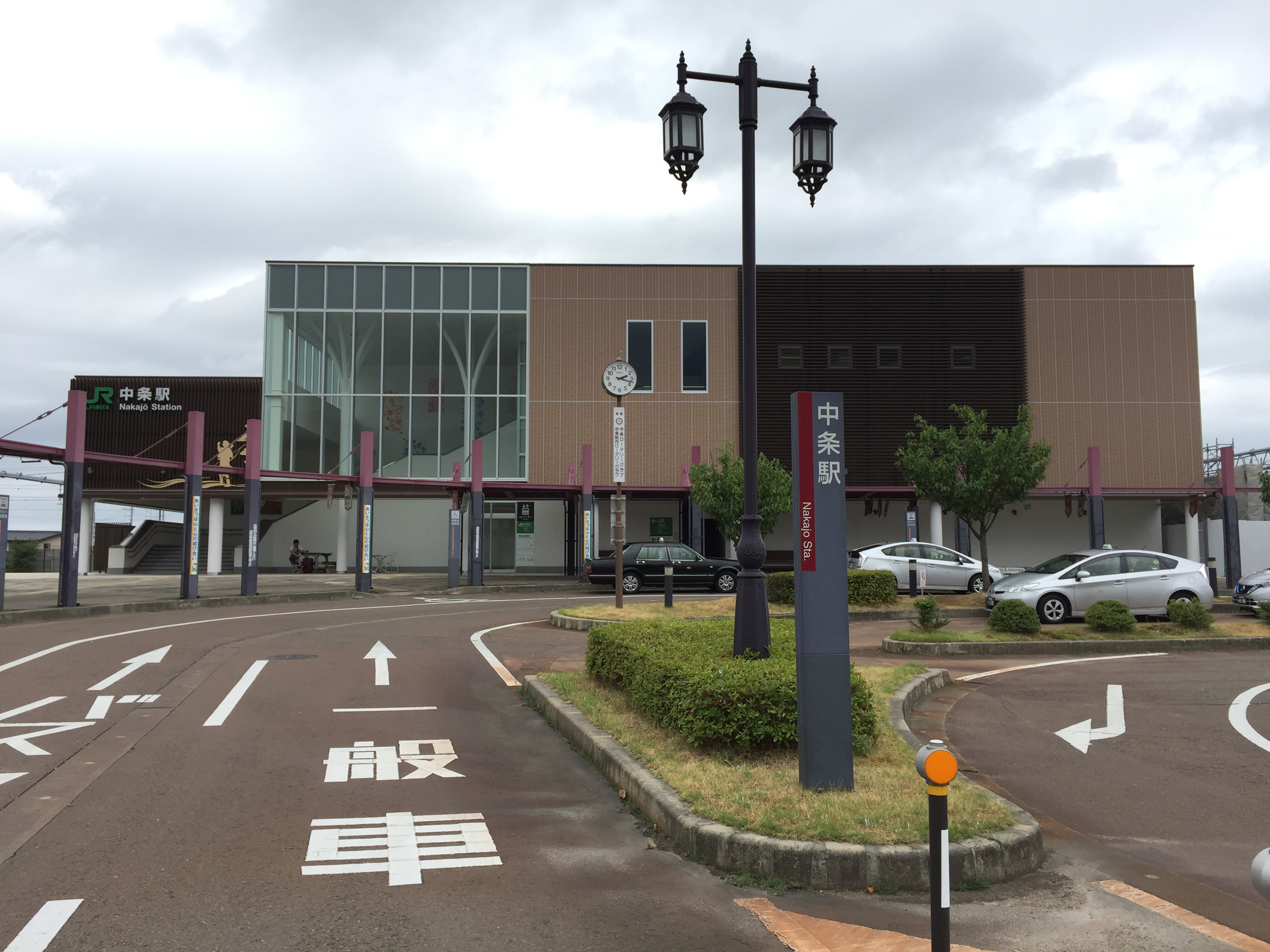
- Nakajō Station in August 2018

General information
- Location: 7-22 Omete-cho, Tainai-shi, Niigata-ken 959-2631; Japan
- Coordinates: 38°02′59.8″N 139°23′53.6″E
- Operator: JR East
- Line: ■ Uetsu Main Line
- Distance: 29.1 km from Niitsu
- Platforms: 1 side + 1 island platform
- Tracks: 3

Other information
- Status: Staffed (Midori no Madoguchi )
- Website: Official website

History
- Opened: 1 June 1914

Passengers
- 1191 daily (FY2017)

Services
Preceding station	JR East	Following station
Shibata towards Niigata	Inaho	Sakamachi towards Akita
Kanazuka towards Niitsu	Uetsu Main Line	Hirakida towards Akita
Location
- Location within Japan

Nakajō Station (中条駅, Nakajō-eki) is a railway station on the Uetsu Main Line in the city of Tainai, Niigata, Japan, operated by East Japan Railway Company (JR East).

== Lines ==
Nakajō Station is served by the Uetsu Main Line and is 29.1 kilometers from the terminus of the line at Niitsu.

== Station layout ==
The station consists of one side platform and one island platform connected by a footbridge. The station has a Midori no Madoguchi staffed ticket office.

=== Platforms ===
1	■ Uetsu Main Line	for Niitsu and Niigata
2	■ Uetsu Main Line	(siding)
3	■ Uetsu Main Line	for Murakami, Sakata and Yonezawa

== History ==
The station opened on 1 June 1914. With the privatization of Japanese National Railways (JNR) on 1 April 1987, the station came under the control of JR East.

== Passenger statistics ==
In fiscal 2017, the station was used by an average of 1191 passengers daily (boarding passengers only).

== Surrounding area ==
- Tainai city hall
- National Route 7
- Nakajo Post Office
- Mizusawa Chemical Industry Nakajo Factory
- Southern Illinois University Niigata campus site (closed)
- Niigata Prefectural Nakajo High School
- Tainai City Nakajo Junior High School
- Tainai City Nakajo Elementary School
- Kuraray Plastics

== See also ==
- List of railway stations in Japan
