= Ōgata Station =

Railway station in Niigata, Japan

Ōgata Station 大形駅
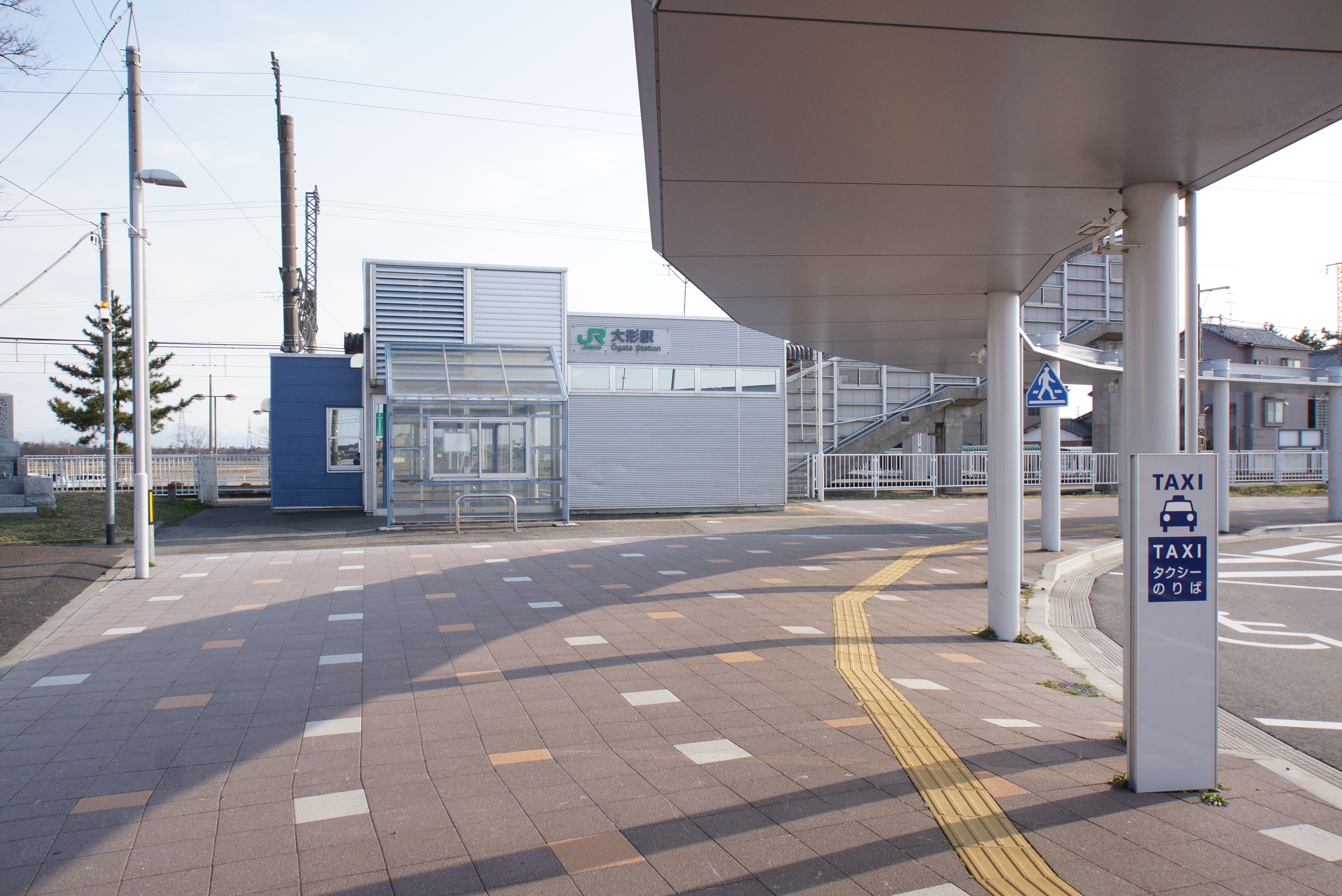
- Ōgata Station North Exit (March 2017)

General information
- Location: 1101 Okayama, Higashi-ku, Niigata-shi, Niigata-ken 950-0821; Japan
- Coordinates: 37°54′56.4″N 139°7′46.4″E
- Operator: JR East
- Line: ■ Hakushin Line
- Distance: 7.0 km from Niigata
- Platforms: 2 side platforms
- Tracks: 2

Other information
- Status: Staffed
- Website: Official website

History
- Opened: 11 February 1957

Passengers
- FY2018: 1,168 daily

Services
Preceding station	JR East	Following station
Higashi-Niigata towards Niigata	Hakushin Line	Niizaki towards Shibata
Location
- Location within JR Hakushin Line Location within Japan

Ōgata Station (大形駅, Ōgata-eki) is a train station in Higashi-ku, Niigata, Niigata Prefecture, Japan, operated by East Japan Railway Company (JR East).

== Lines ==
Ōgata Station is served by the Hakushin Line, and is 7.0 kilometers from the starting point of the line at Niigata Station.

== Station layout ==
The station consists of two ground-level opposed side platforms connected by a footbridge, serving two tracks. The station is staffed.

=== Platforms ===
1	■ Hakushin Line	for Toyosaka, Shibata and Murakami
2	■ Hakushin Line	for Niigata

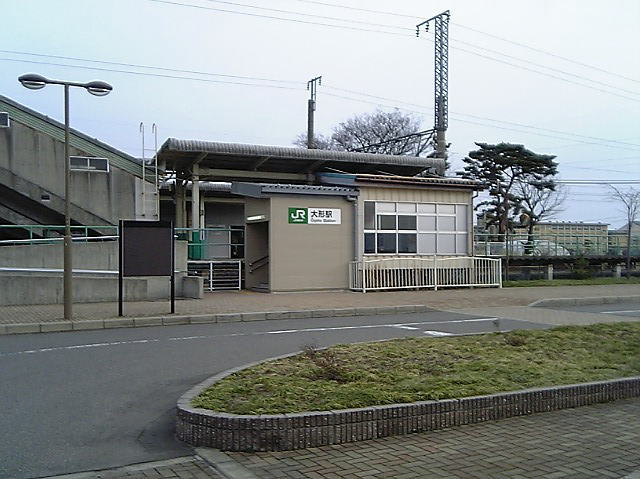
Ōgata Station south exit (March 2006)

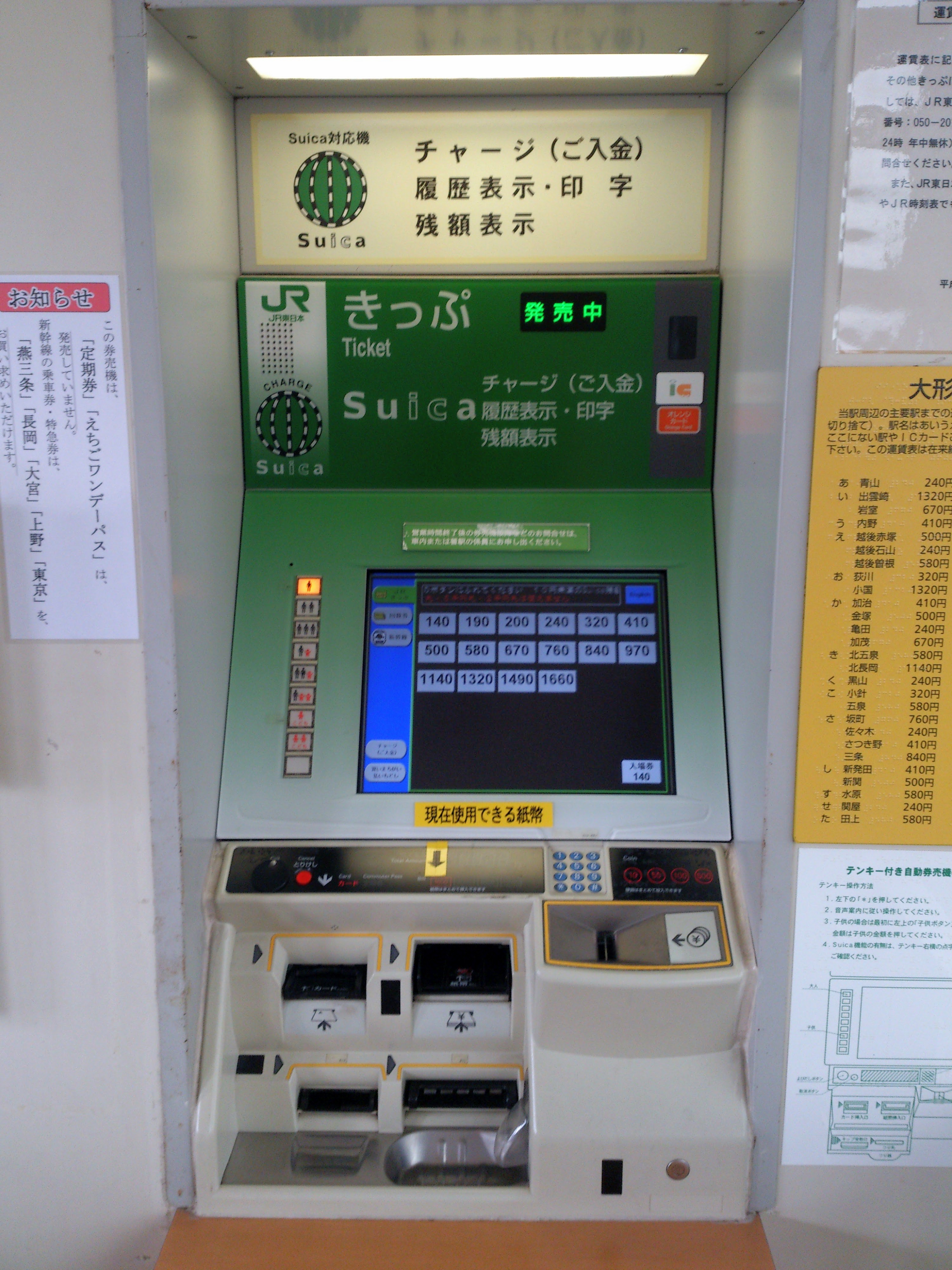
Ticket Machine

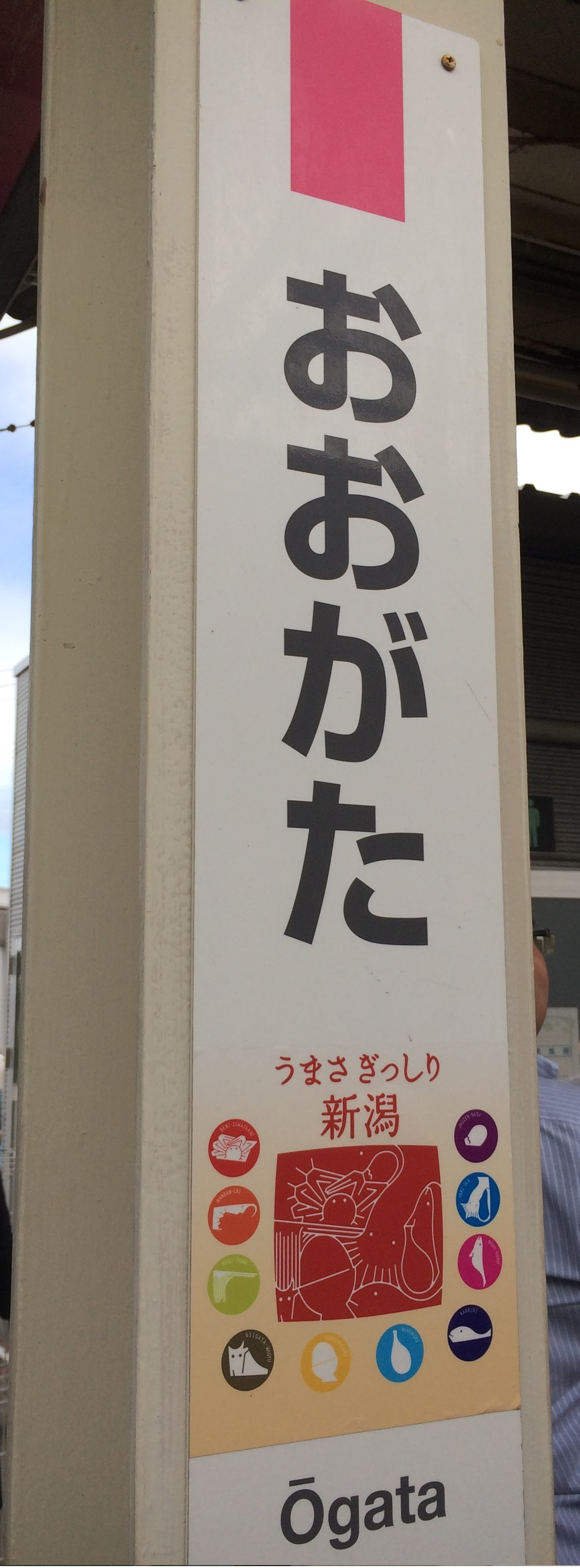
Station name plate

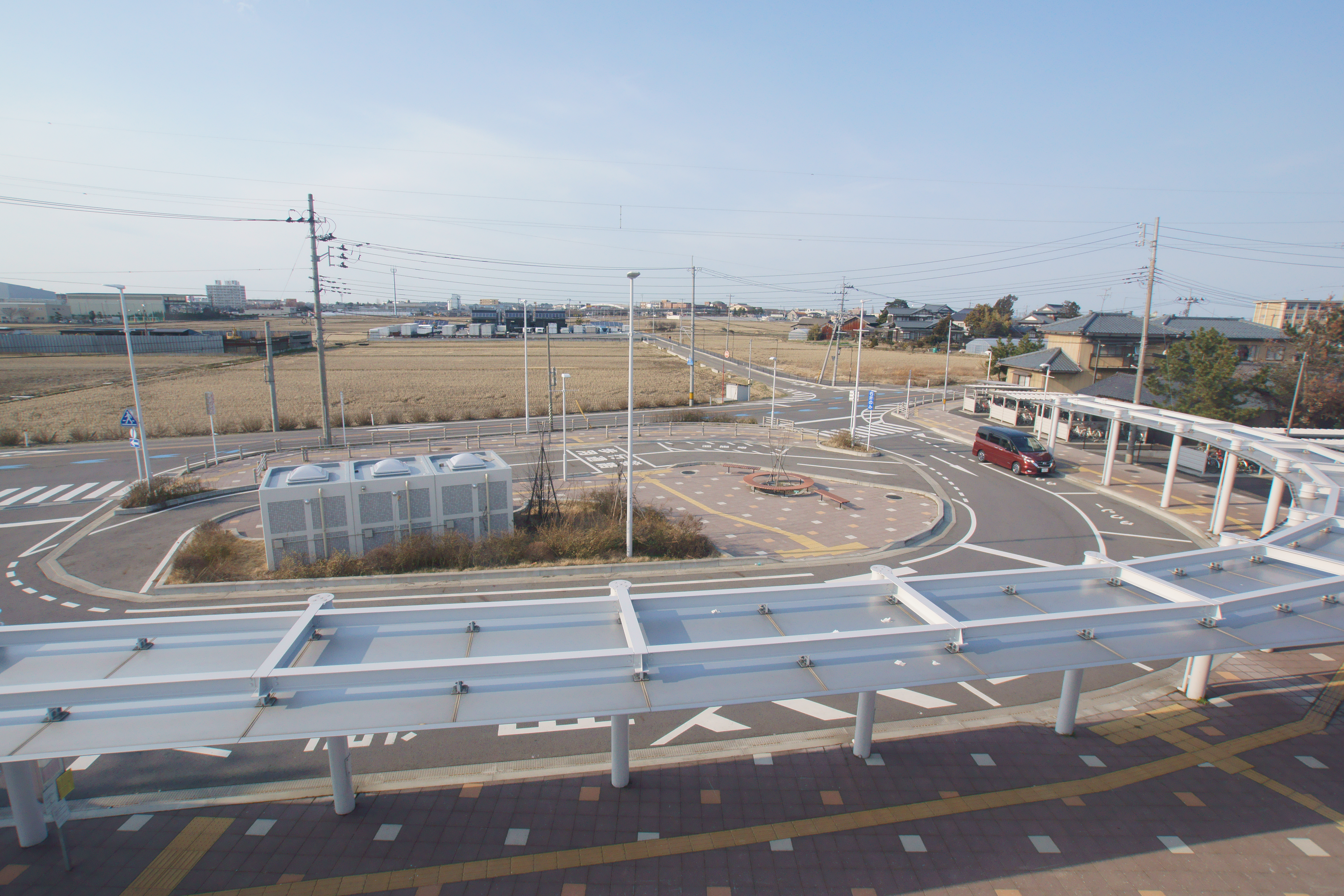
View from north exit (May 2017)

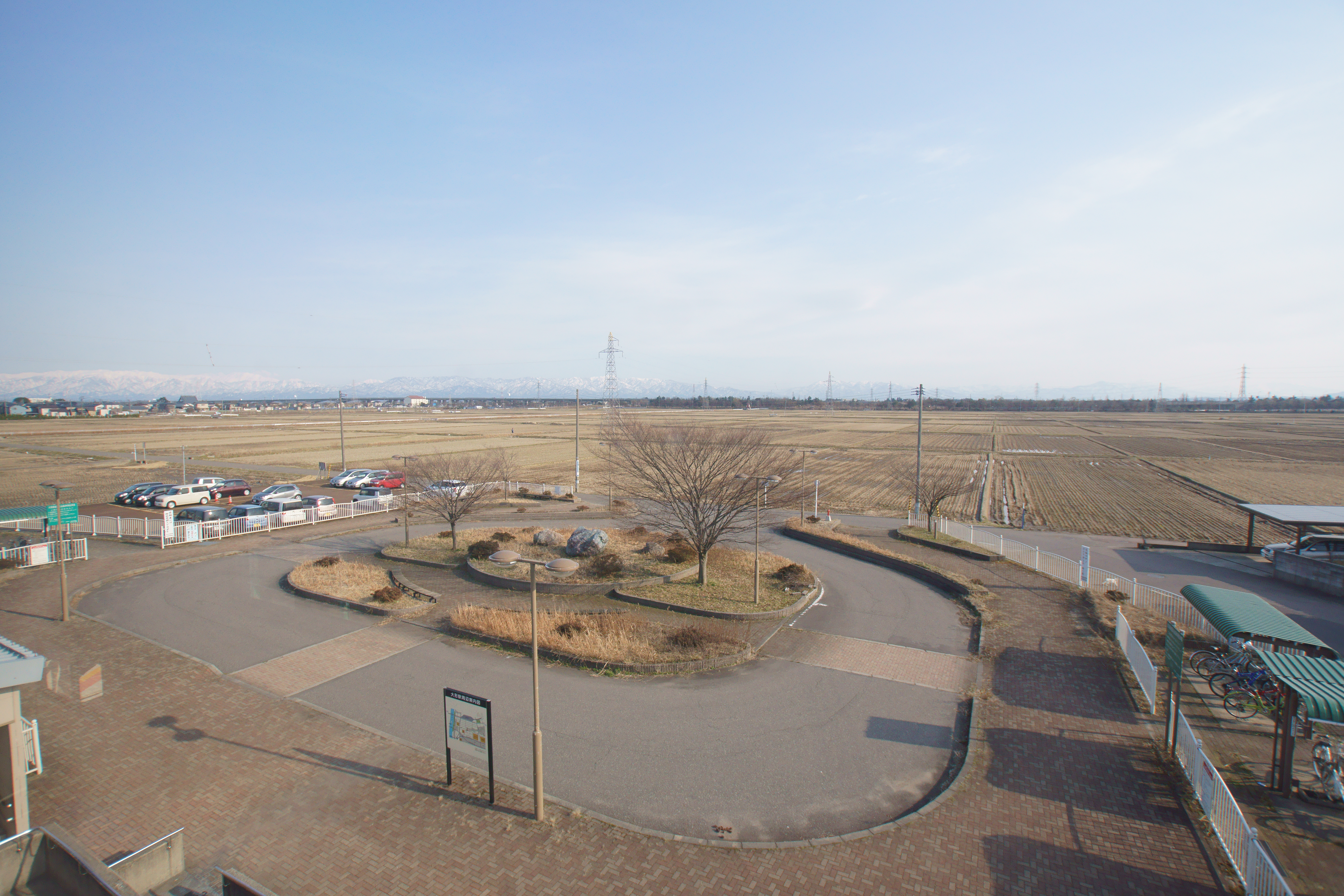
View from south exit (May 2017)

== History ==
The station opened on 11 February 1957. With the privatization of Japanese National Railways (JNR) on 1 April 1987, the station came under the control of JR East.

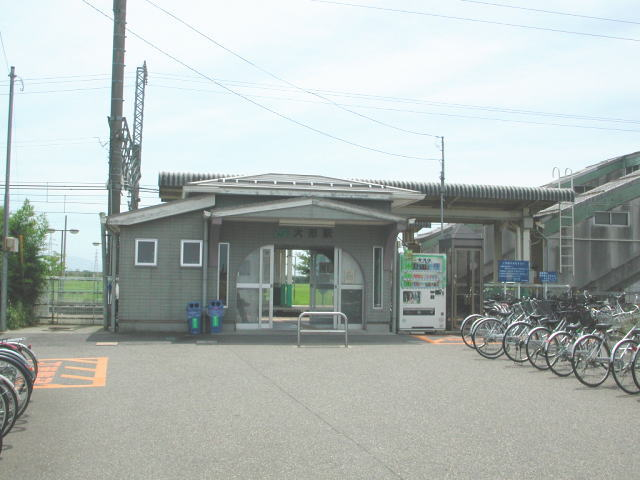
Former north station building (August 2004)

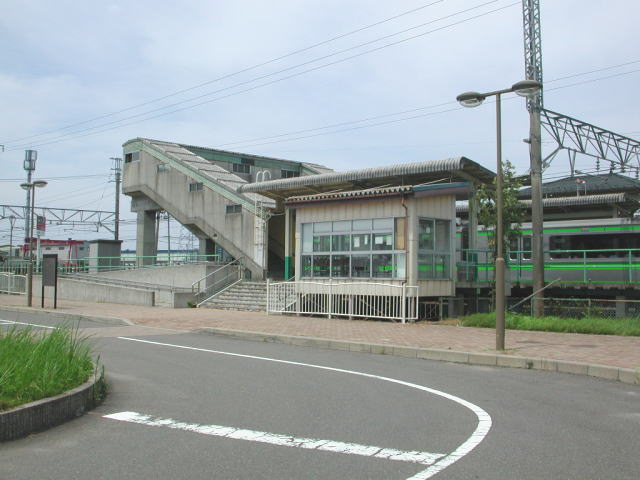
Former south station building (August 2004)

== Passenger statistics ==
In fiscal 2018, the station was used by an average of 1168 passengers daily (boarding passengers only). This was a 4.18% reduction compared to the fiscal 2017 count of 1219 passengers daily.

== Surrounding area ==
- University of Niigata Prefecture
- Niigata Kita High School

== See also ==
- List of railway stations in Japan
