= Higashi-Niigata Station =

Railway station in Niigata, Japan

Higashi-Niigata Station 東新潟駅
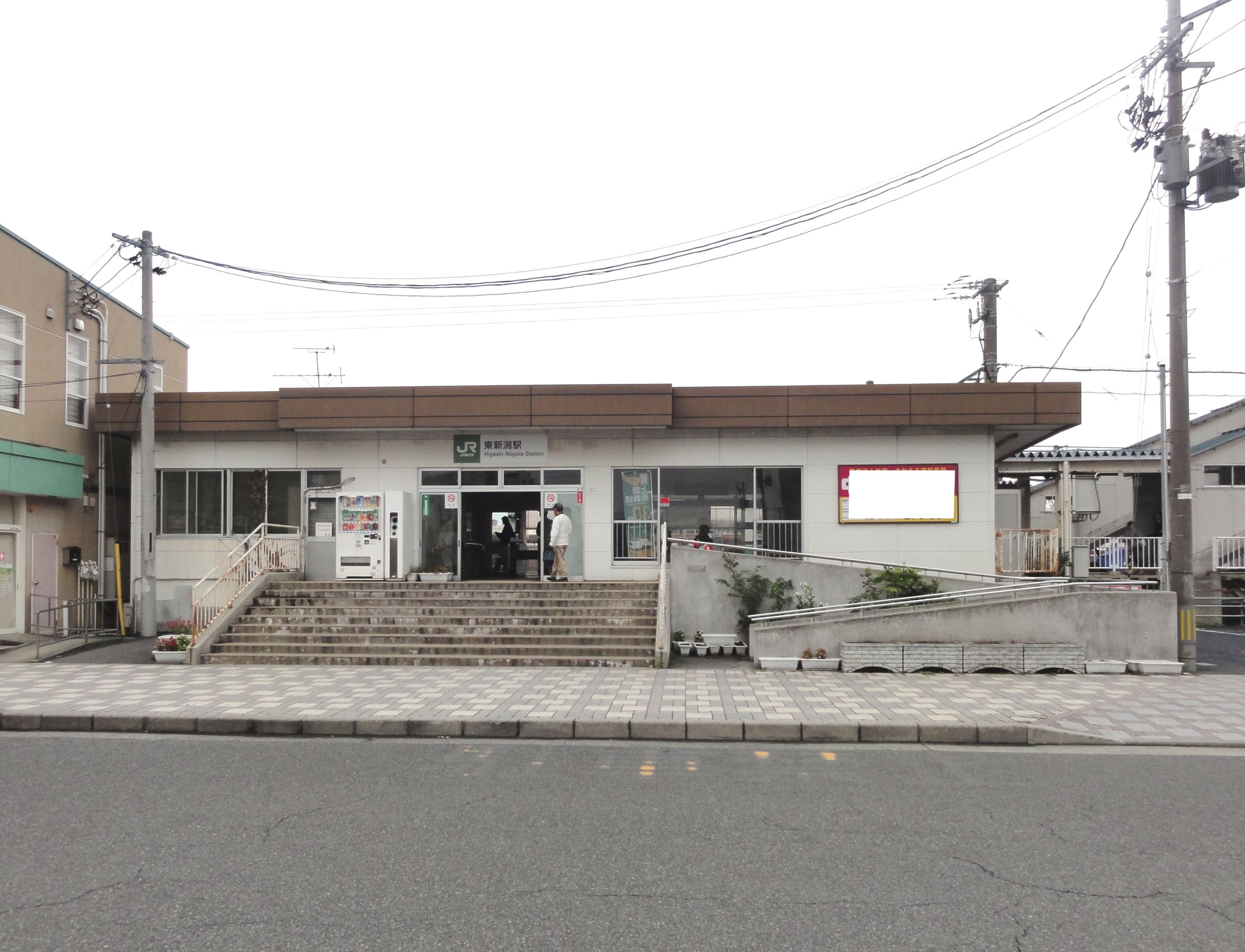
- Higashi-Niigata Station entrance in October 2012

General information
- Location: Nakajima-Urazawa, Higashi-ku, Niigata-shi, Niigata-ken 950-0824; Japan
- Coordinates: 37°54′31.3″N 139°6′31.7″E
- Elevation: 1.3 m
- Operator: JR East
- Line: ■ Hakushin Line
- Distance: 22.3 km from Shibata
- Platforms: 2 side platforms
- Tracks: 2

Other information
- Status: Staffed
- Website: Official website

History
- Opened: 2 October 1978

Passengers
- FY2018: 1769 daily

Services
Preceding station	JR East	Following station
Niigata Terminus	Hakushin Line	Ōgata towards Shibata
Location
- Location within JR Hakushin Line Location within Japan

Higashi-Niigata Station (東新潟, Higashi-Niigata-eki) is a railway station on the Hakushin Line operated by East Japan Railway Company (JR East) in Higashi-ku, Niigata, Japan.

== Lines ==
Higashi-Niigata Station is served by the Hakushin Line, and lies 22.3 km from the starting point of the line at Shibata and 5.0 kilometers from Niigata Station.

== Station layout ==
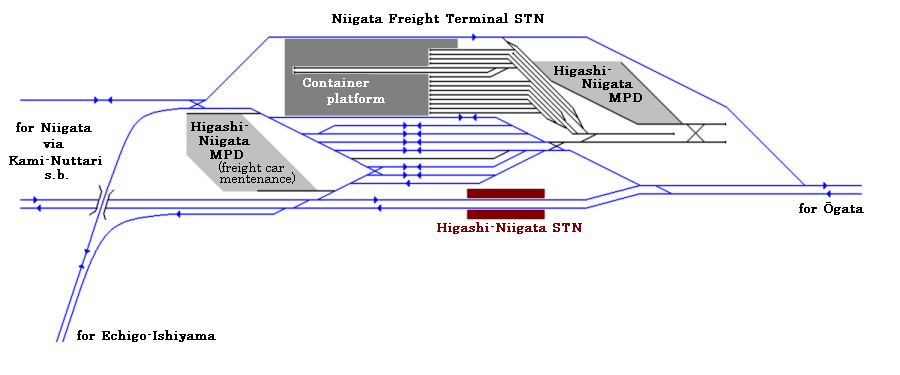
Track diagram of Higashi-Niigata Station and Niigata Freight Terminal

The station consists of two ground-level opposed side platforms serving two tracks, connected by a footbridge, with the station building located on the south side. The station is located next to Niigata Freight Terminal.

=== Platforms ===
1	■ Hakushin Line	for Niigata
2	■ Hakushin Line	for Toyosaka and Shibata

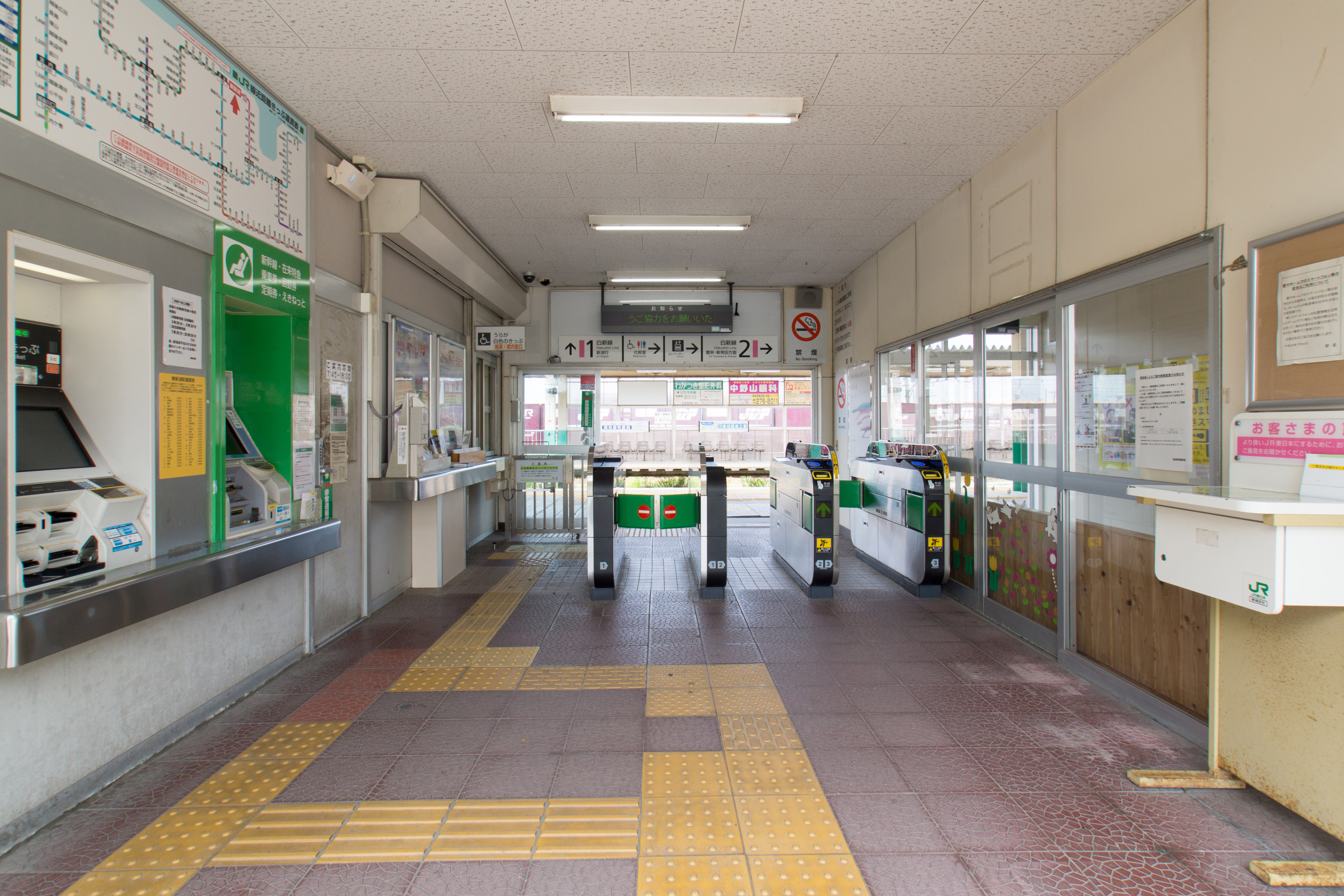
The ticket barriers leading to the platforms in June 2017

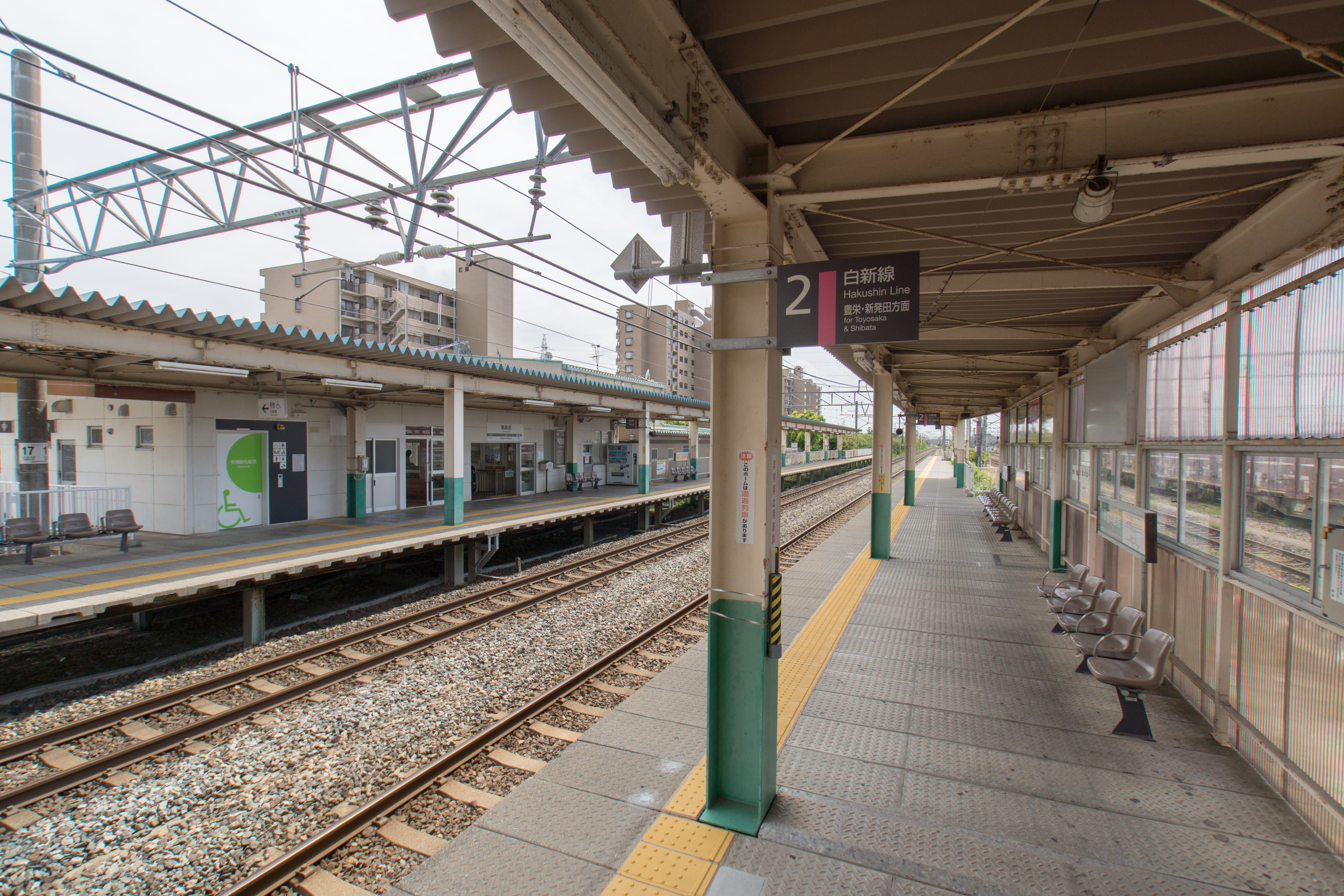
The platforms in June 2017, looking west (toward Niigata)

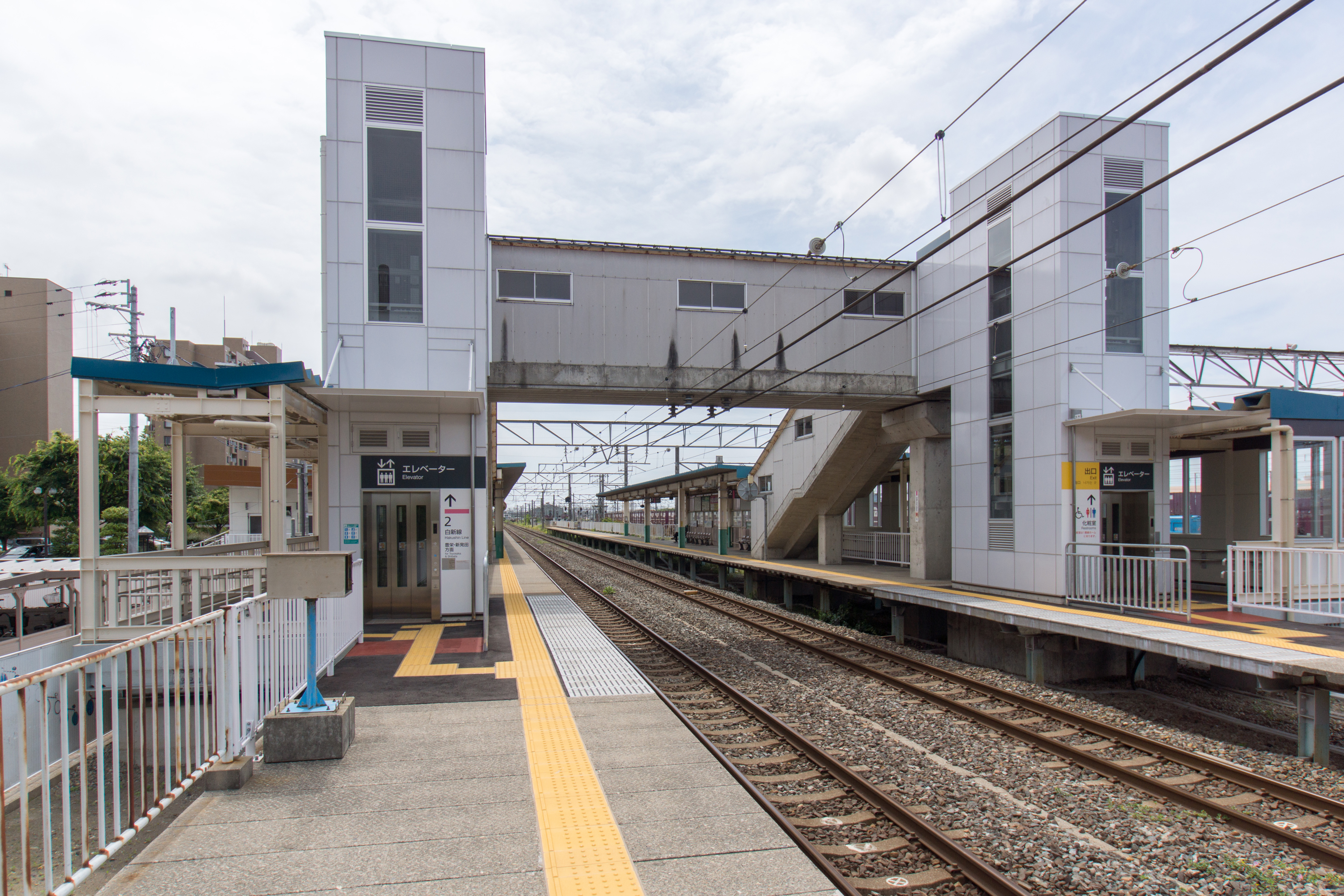
The footbridge and passenger lifts in June 2017

== History ==
The station opened on 2 October 1978. Prior to this, a single 100 m long temporary platform was provided on what is now the up line from 1 February 1958 to serve the adjoining marshalling yard which opened on 1 October 1957. In September 1978, the line was double-tracked, and a new platform and station building was constructed on the down line a distance of 200 m to the north of the up line platform, earning the station the nickname "the most inconvenient station in Japan". The station was subsequently remodelled, with the down platform and station building moved to the present-day location on the south side of the freight yard.

With the privatization of Japanese National Railways (JNR) on 1 April 1987, the station came under the control of JR East. Elevators from the platform level to the overpass were installed on February 18, 2017.

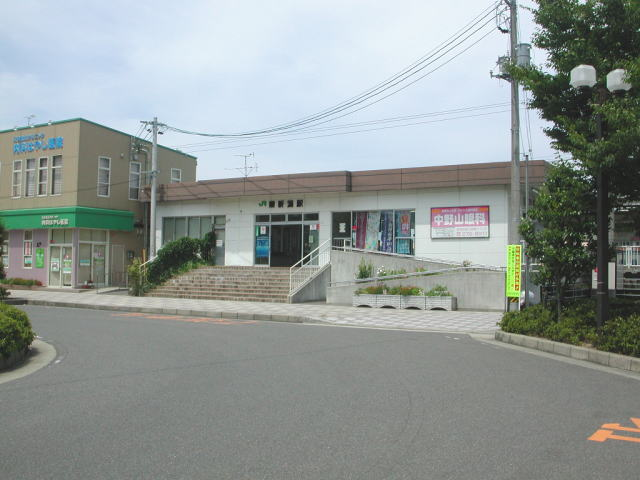
Higashi-Niigata Station entrance in August 2004

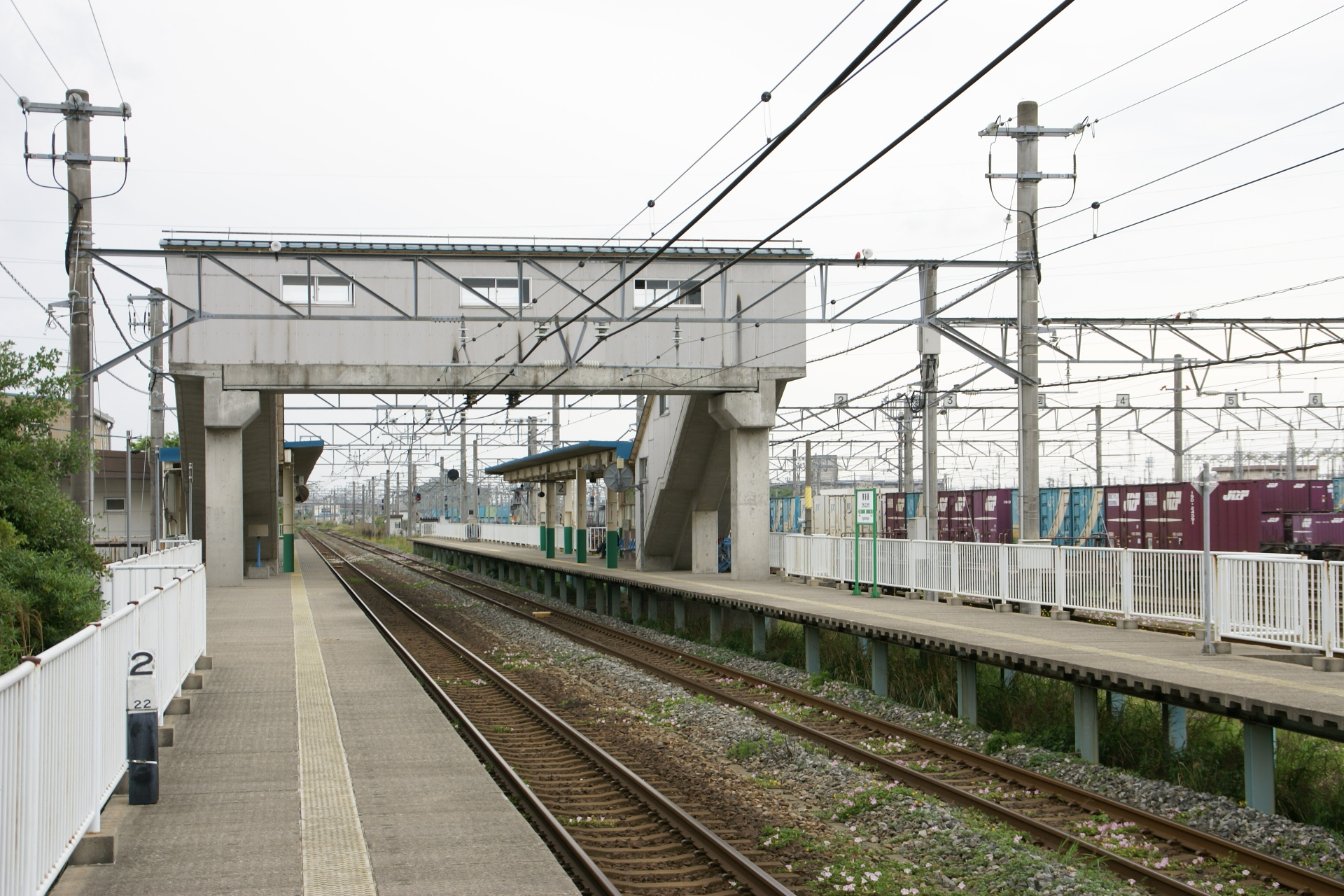
The platforms and footbridge in 2008 before the addition of passenger lifts

== Passenger statistics ==
In fiscal year 2018, the station was used by an average of 1769 passengers daily (boarding passengers only). This was a 1.67% reduction compared to the levels during fiscal year 2017 of 1799 passengers daily.

== Surrounding area ==
The station is located in a semi-rural residential area. JR Freight's Niigata Freight Terminal is located next to the station. JR East's Niigata Shinkansen Depot lies on the north side of the freight terminal.

== See also ==
- List of railway stations in Japan
