= Niizaki Station =

Railway station in Niigata, Japan

Niizaki Station 新崎駅
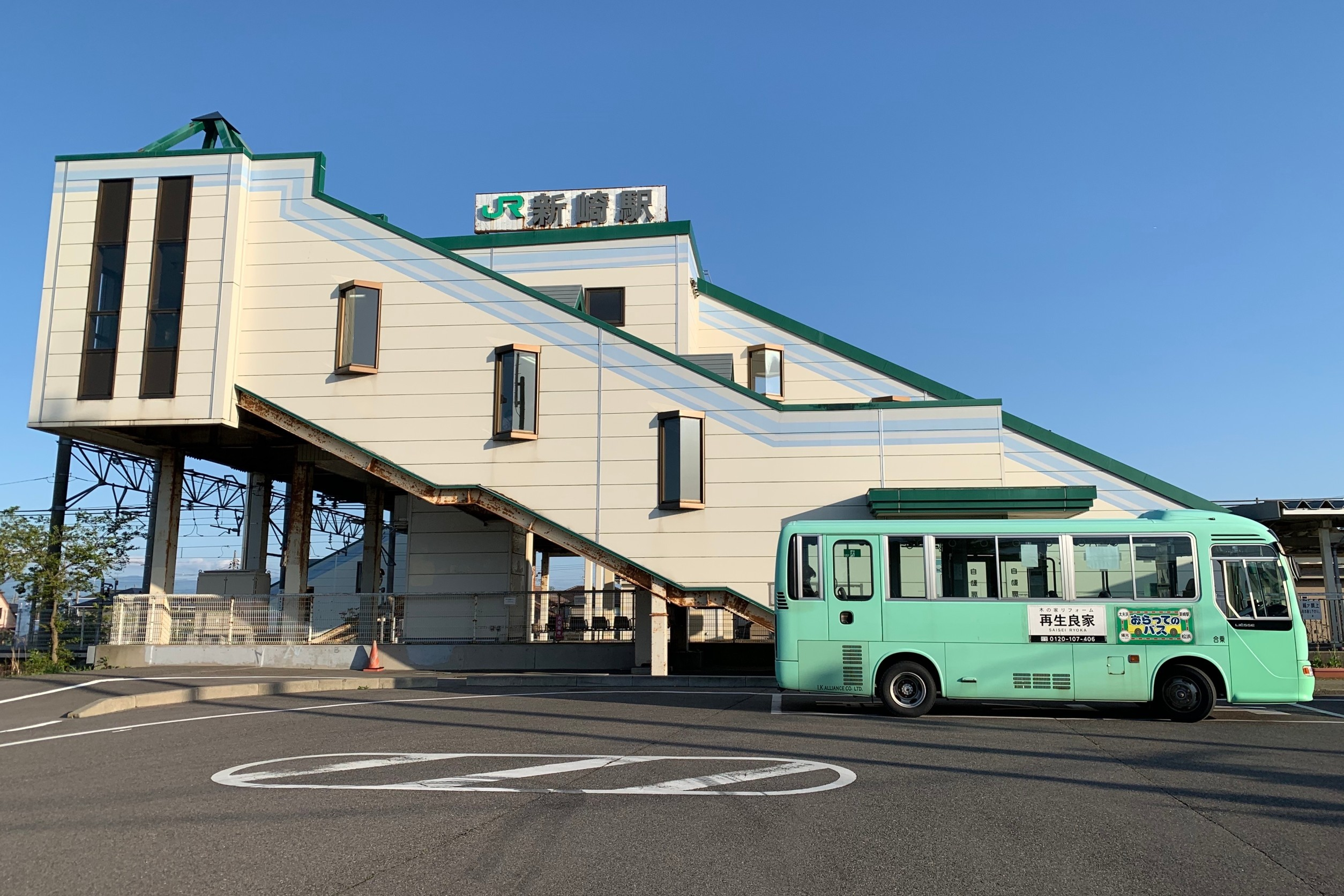
- Niizaki Station north exit, May 2020

General information
- Location: 1 Niizaki, Kita-ku, Niigata-shi, Niigata-ken 950-3134; Japan
- Coordinates: 37°55′21.2″N 139°9′29.7″E
- Operator: JR East; JR Freight
- Line: ■ Hakushin Line
- Distance: 9.6 km from Niigata.
- Platforms: 1 island + 1 side platform
- Tracks: 3

Other information
- Status: Staffed ("Midori no Madoguchi" )
- Website: Official website

History
- Opened: 15 April 1956

Passengers
- FY2017: 1,347 daily

Services
Preceding station	JR East	Following station
Ōgata towards Niigata	Hakushin Line	Hayadōri towards Shibata
Location
- Location within JR Hakushin Line Location within Japan

Niizaki Station (新崎駅, Niizaki-eki) is a train station in Kita-ku, Niigata, Niigata Prefecture, Japan, operated by East Japan Railway Company (JR East). It is also a freight terminal for the Japan Freight Railway Company.

== Lines ==
Niizaki Station is served by the Hakushin Line, and is 9.6 kilometers from the starting point of the line at Niigata Station.

== Station layout ==
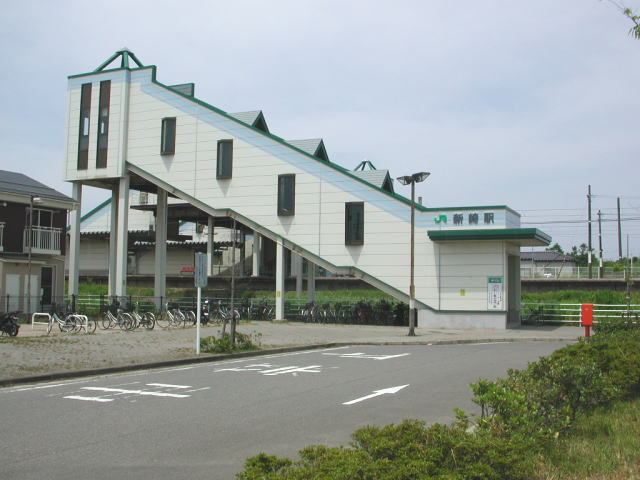
Niizaki Station south exit, August 2004

The station consists of a side platform (1) and an island platform (2/3) serving three tracks, with the station situated above the tracks. The station has a "Midori no Madoguchi" staffed ticket office.

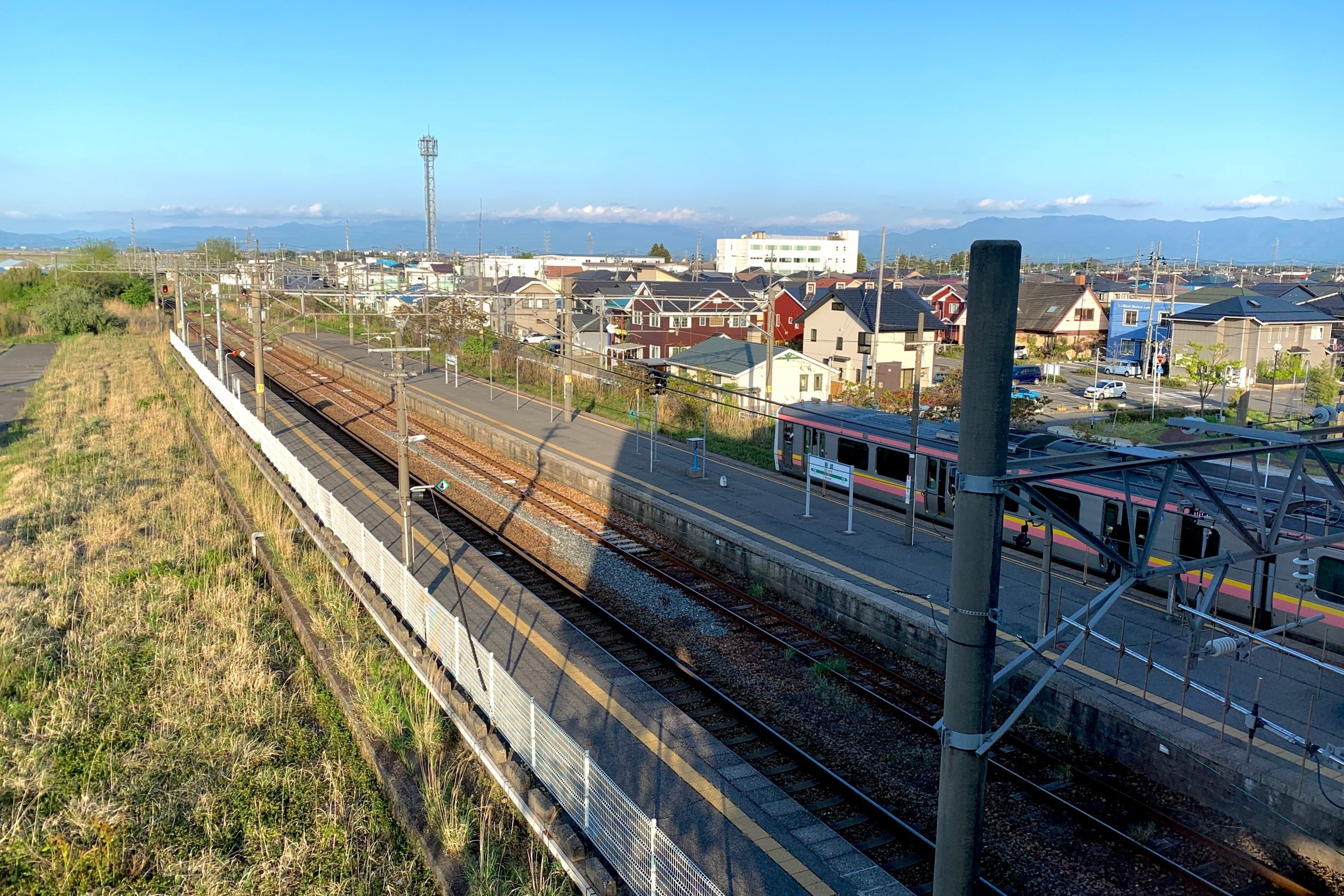
Platforms, May 2020

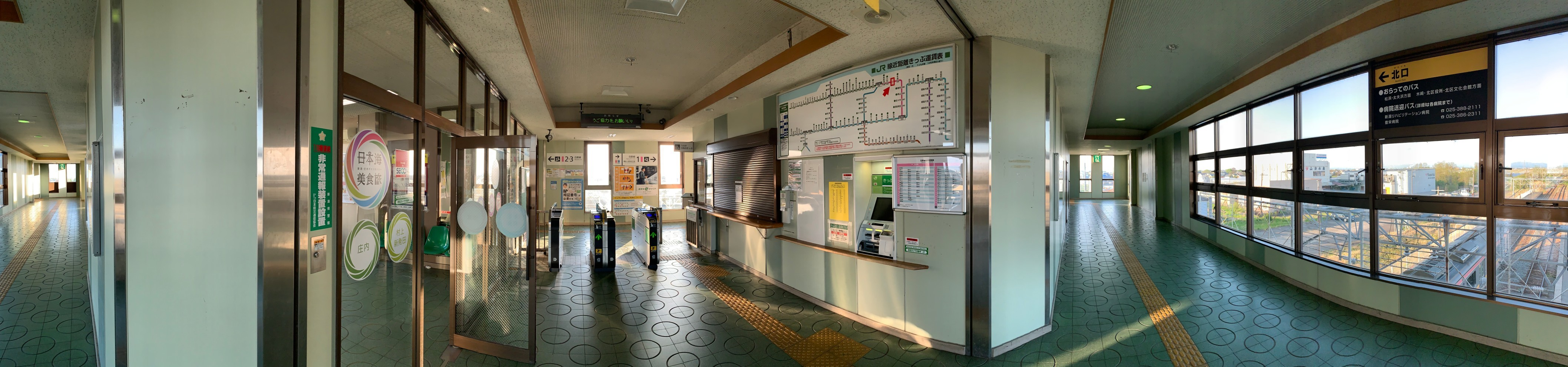
Station interior, May 2020

=== Platforms ===
1	■ Hakushin Line	for Toyosaka, Shibata and Murakami
2	■ Hakushin Line	for Shibata and Niigata (bidirectional)
3	■ Hakushin Line	for Niigata

== History ==
Niizaki Station opened on 15 April 1956. With the privatization of Japanese National Railways (JNR) on 1 April 1987, the station came under the control of JR East.

== Passenger statistics ==
In fiscal 2017, the station was used by an average of 1347 passengers daily (boarding passengers only).

== Surrounding area ==
- Niizaki Industrial Park

== See also ==
- List of railway stations in Japan
