= Sasaki Station =

Railway station in Shibata, Niigata Prefecture, Japan

Sasaki Station 佐々木駅
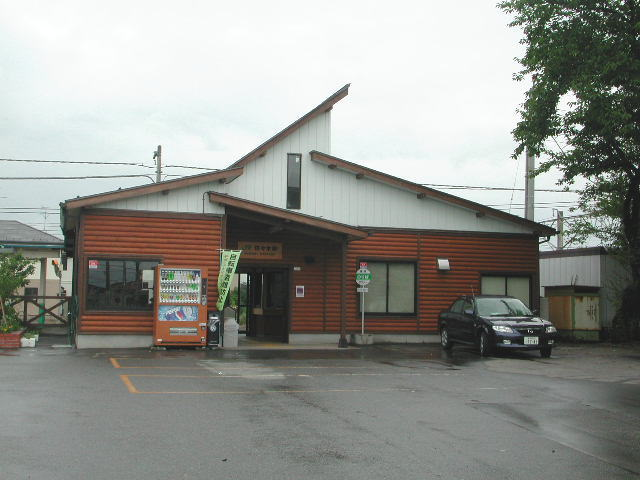
- Sasaki Station, July 2004

General information
- Location: 83-2 Kami-Nakasawa, Shibata-shi, Niigata-ken 957-0081; Japan
- Coordinates: 37°57′0.2″N 139°16′9.2″E
- Operator: JR East
- Line: ■ Hakushin Line
- Distance: 21.0 km from Niigata
- Platforms: 1 side + 1 island platform
- Tracks: 3

Other information
- Website: Official website

History
- Opened: 23 December 1952

Passengers
- FY2017: 890

Services
Preceding station	JR East	Following station
Kuroyama towards Niigata	Hakushin Line	Nishi-Shibata towards Shibata
Location
- Location within JR Hakushin Line Location within Japan

Sasaki Station (佐々木駅, Sasaki-eki) is a railway station in the city of Shibata, Niigata, Japan, operated by East Japan Railway Company (JR East).

== Lines ==
Sasaki Station is served by the Hakushin Line, and is 21.0 kilometers from the starting point of the line at Niigata Station.

== Station layout ==
The station consists of one side platform and one island platform connected to the station building by a footbridge.

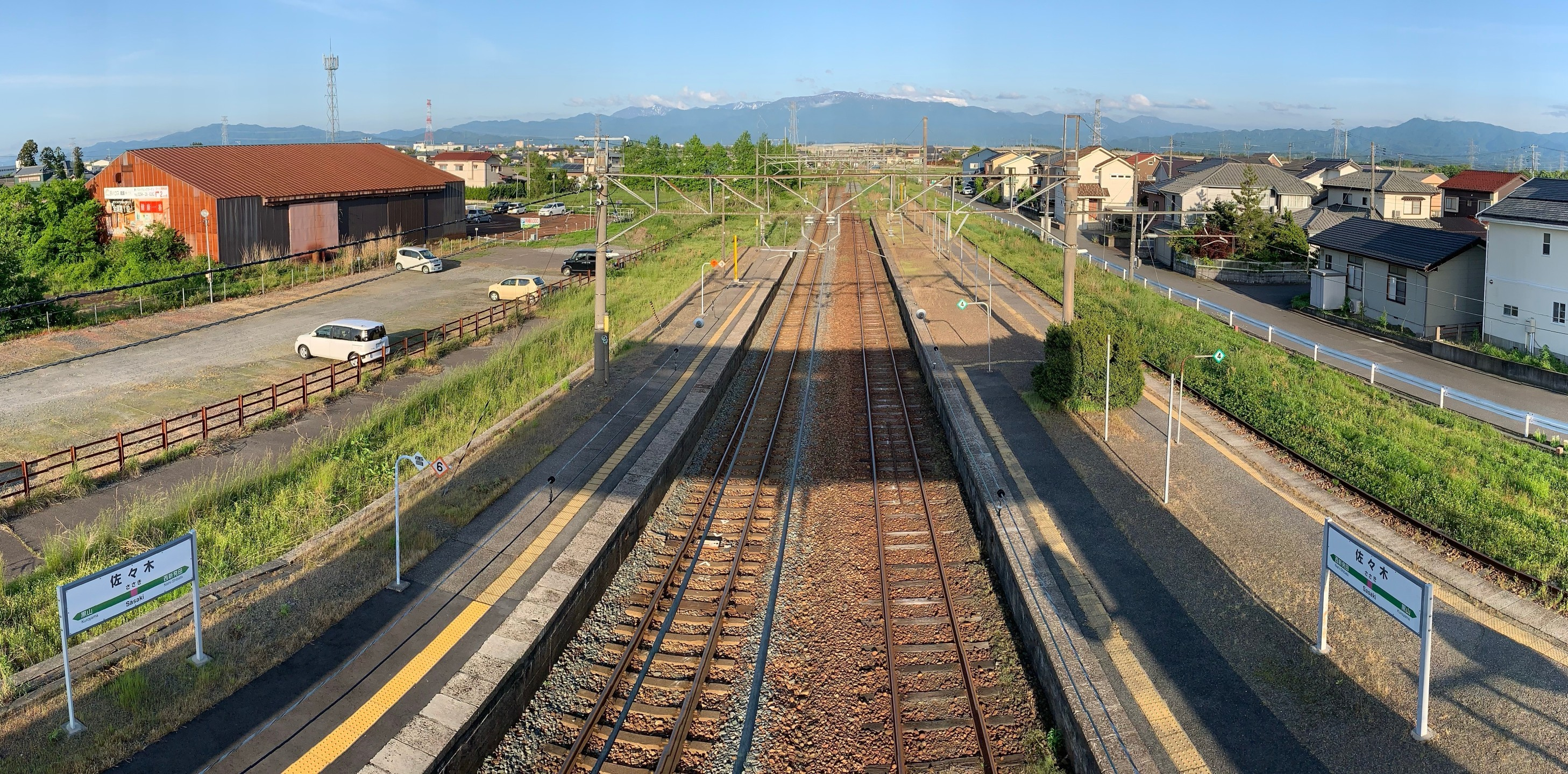
Platforms, May 2020

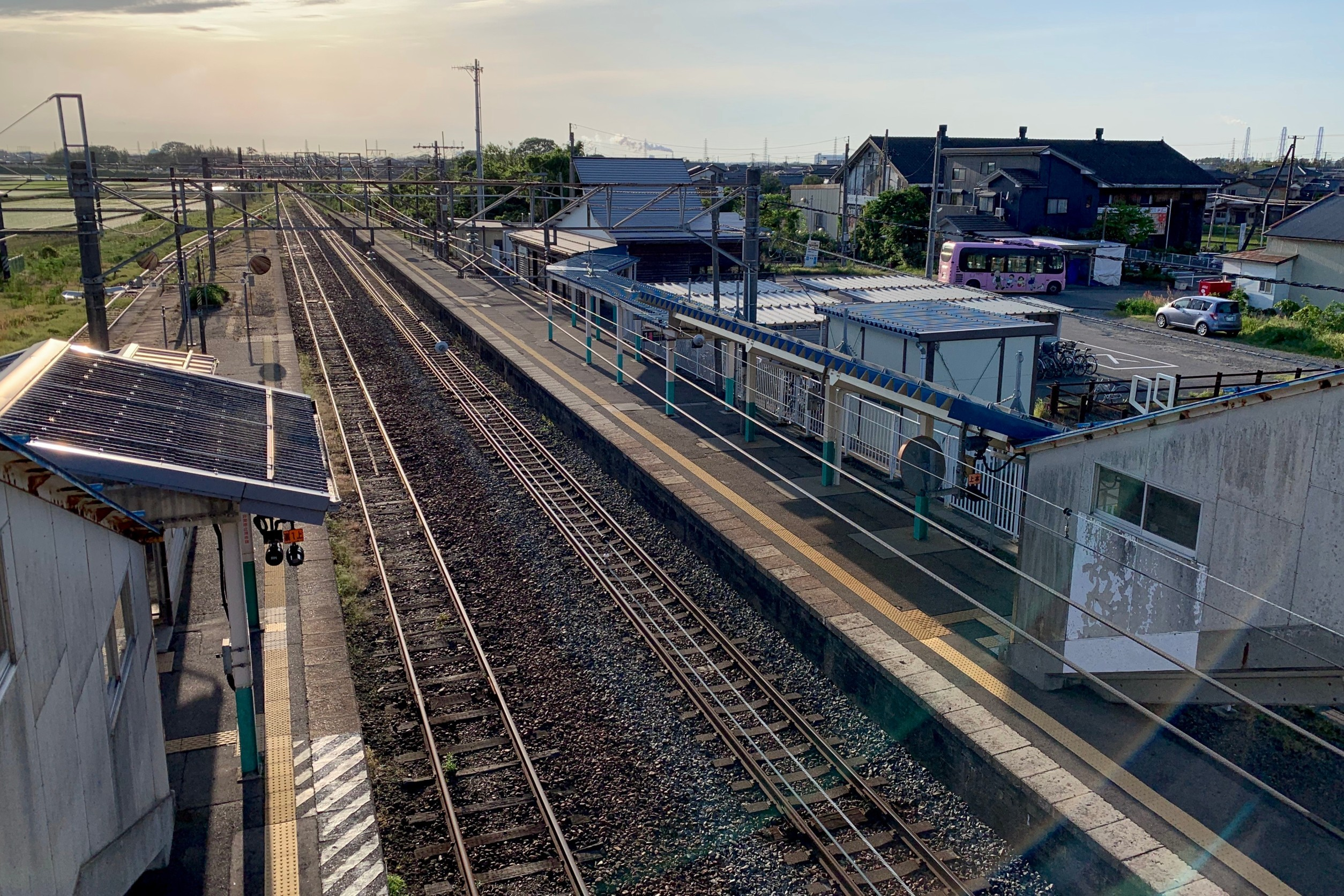
Platforms, May 2020

=== Platforms ===
1	■ Hakushin Line	for Shibata and Murakami for Niigata and Toyosaka
2	■ Hakushin Line	not in use
3	■ Hakushin Line	for Shibata and Murakami for Niigata and Toyosaka

== History ==
Sasaki Station opened on 23 December 1952. With the privatization of Japanese National Railways (JNR) on 1 April 1987, the station came under the control of JR East.

== Passenger statistics ==
In fiscal 2017, the station was used by an average of 890 passengers daily (boarding passengers only).

== Surrounding area ==
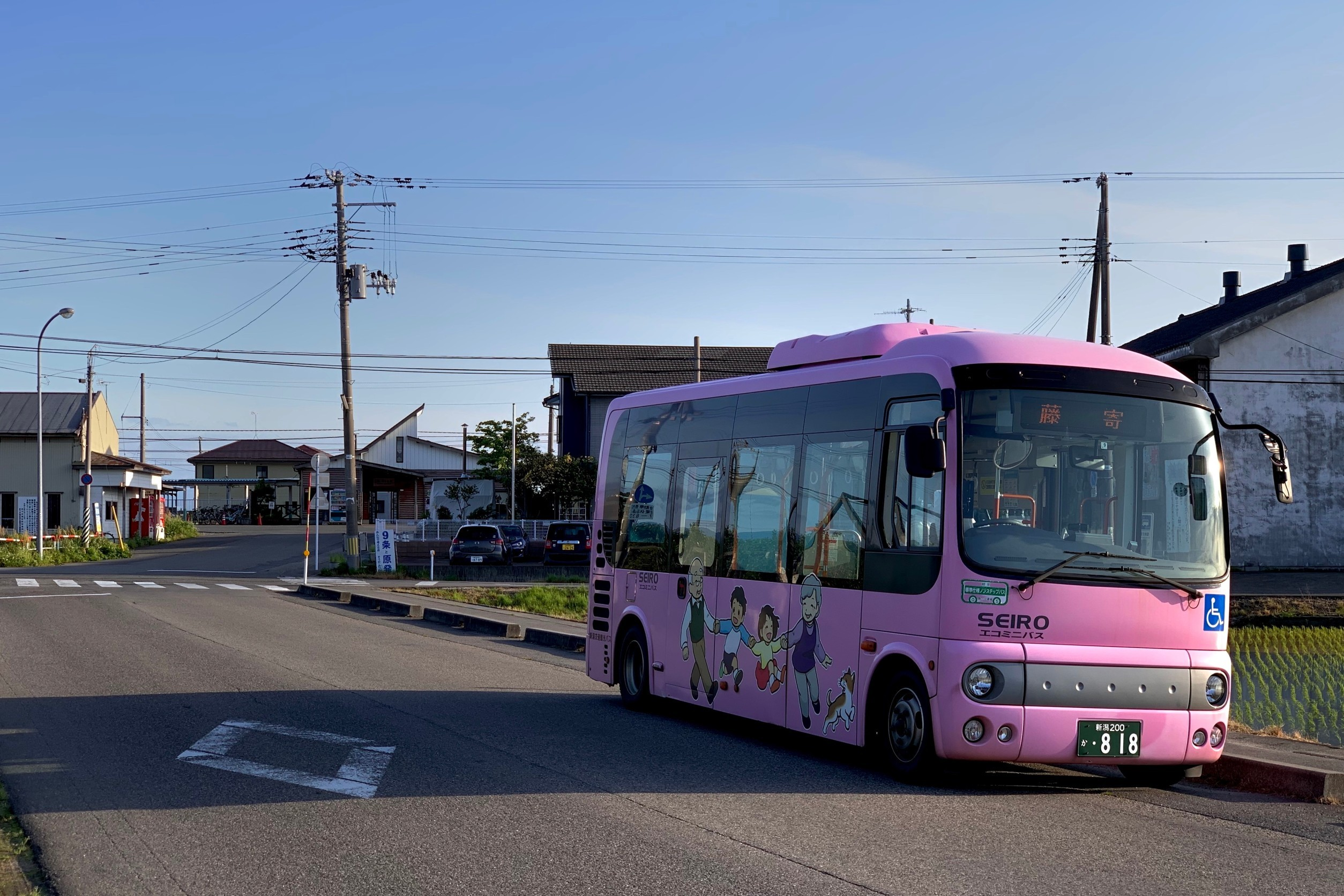
Bus connecting Sasaki Station and Seiro Town, May 2020

- Sasaki Post Office

== See also ==
- List of railway stations in Japan
