= Kuroyama Station =

Railway station in Niigata, Japan

Kuroyama Station 黒山駅
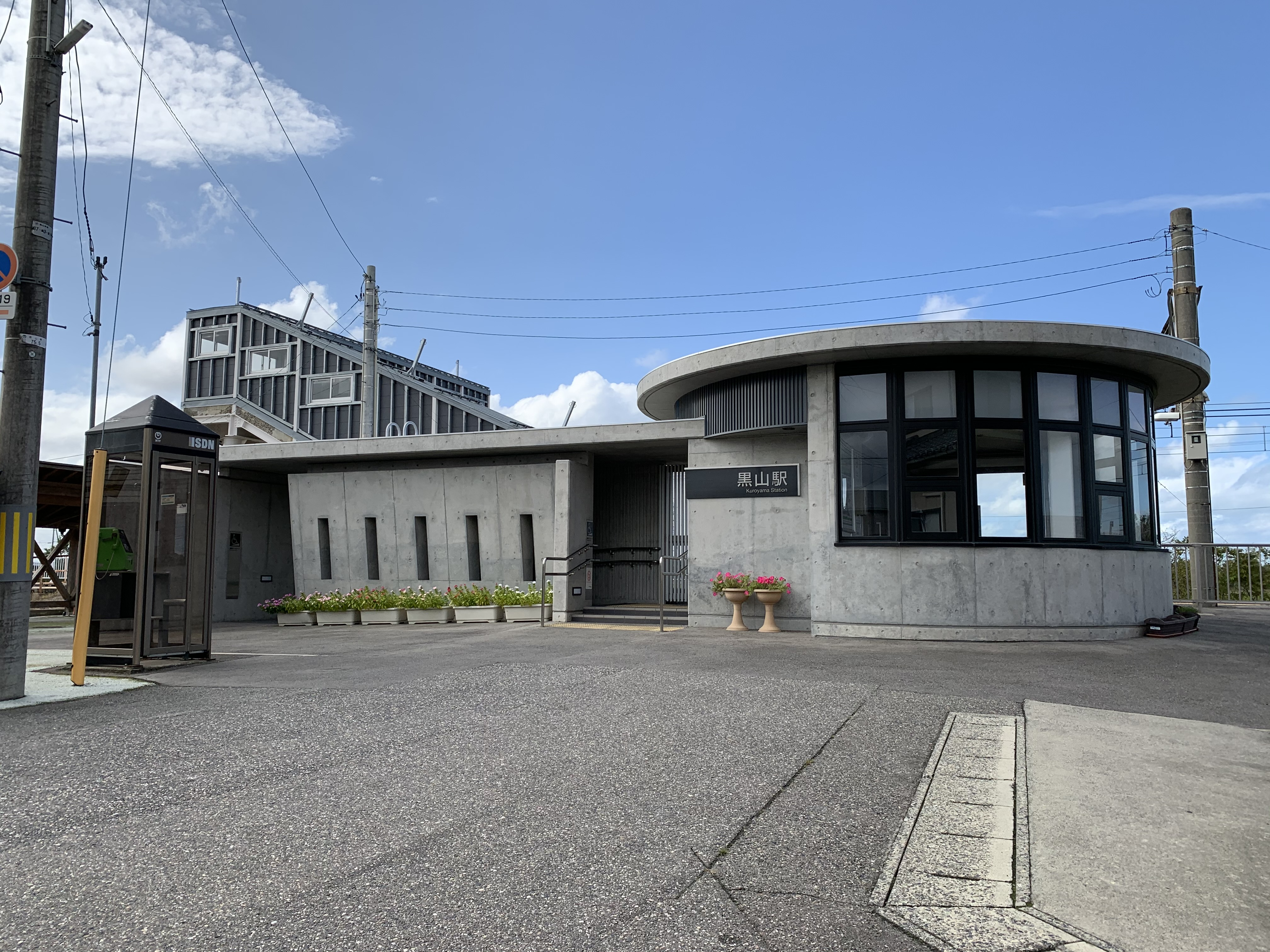
- Kuroyama Station, October 2019

General information
- Location: 2314 Ōta, Kita-ku, Niigata-shi, Niigata-ken 950-3313; Japan
- Coordinates: 37°56′14.85″N 139°14′30.25″E
- Operator: JR East; JR Freight
- Line: ■ Hakushin Line
- Distance: 18.0 km from Niigata
- Platforms: 2 side platforms
- Tracks: 2

Other information
- Status: Unstaffed
- Website: Official website

History
- Opened: 11 February 1957

Passengers
- FY2010: 192 daily

Services
Preceding station	JR East	Following station
Toyosaka towards Niigata	Hakushin Line	Sasaki towards Shibata
Location
- Location within JR Hakushin Line Location within Niigata city Location within Niigata Prefecture Location within Japan

Kuroyama Station (黒山駅, Kuroyama-eki) is a train station in Kita-ku, Niigata, Niigata Prefecture, Japan, operated by East Japan Railway Company (JR East). It is also a freight terminal for the Japan Freight Railway Company.

== Lines ==
Kuroyama Station is served by the Hakushin Line, and is 18.0 kilometers from the starting point of the line at Niigata Station.

== Layout ==
The station consists of two ground-level opposed side platforms connected by a footbridge, serving two tracks. The station is unattended.

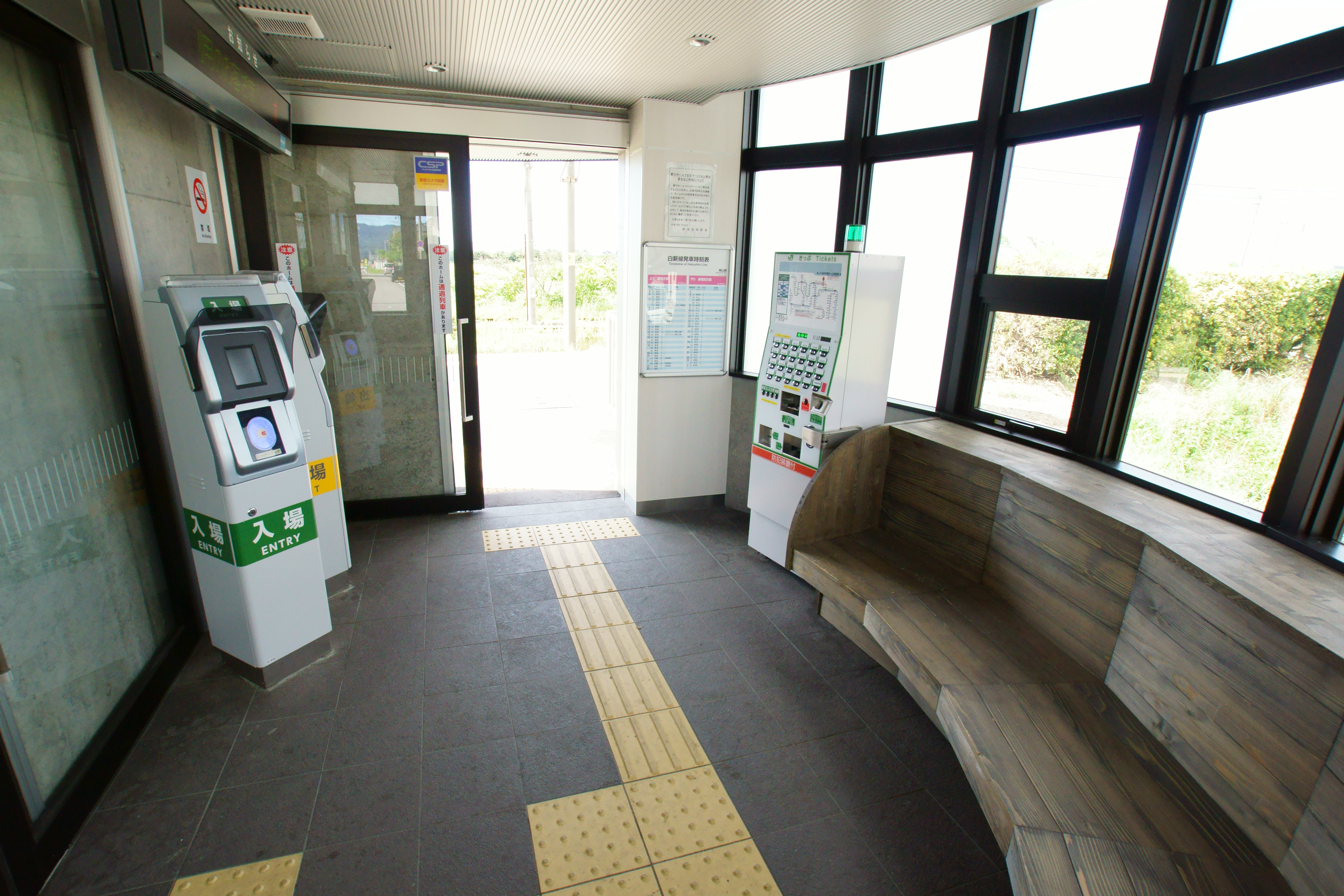
Gate and waiting room (August 2016)

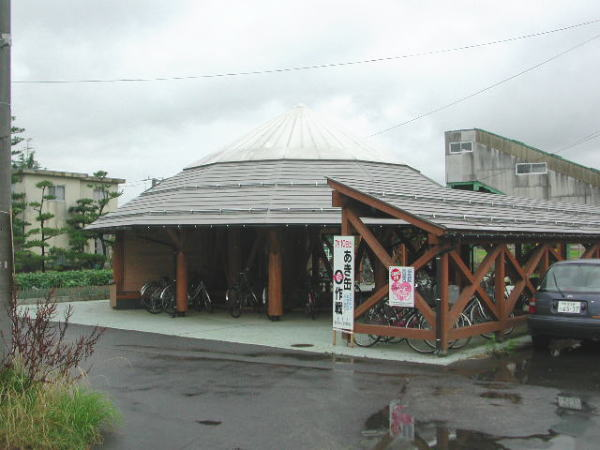
Bicycle parking (July 2004)

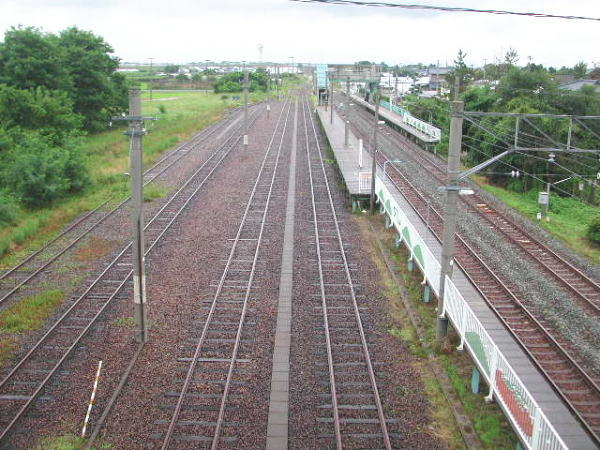
Platforms (July 2004)

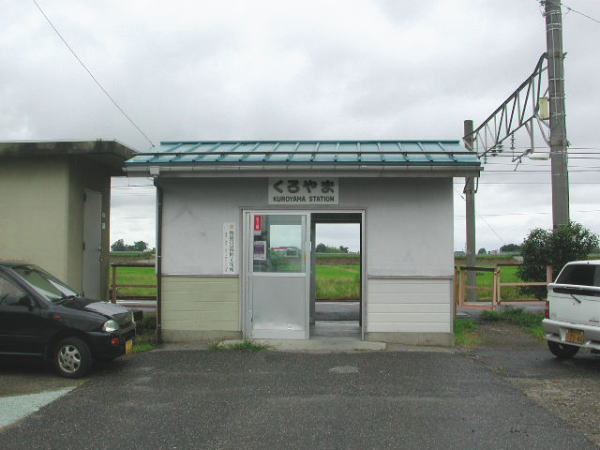
Former building (July 2004)

=== Platforms ===
1	■ Hakushin Line	for Shibata and Niigata (bidirectional)
2	■ Hakushin Line	for Shibata and Niigata (bidirectional)

== History ==
The station opened on 11 February 1957. With the privatization of Japanese National Railways (JNR) on 1 April 1987, the station came under the control of JR East.

== Surrounding area ==
The station is located in a semi-rural residential area.

== See also ==
- List of railway stations in Japan
