= Hakushin Line =

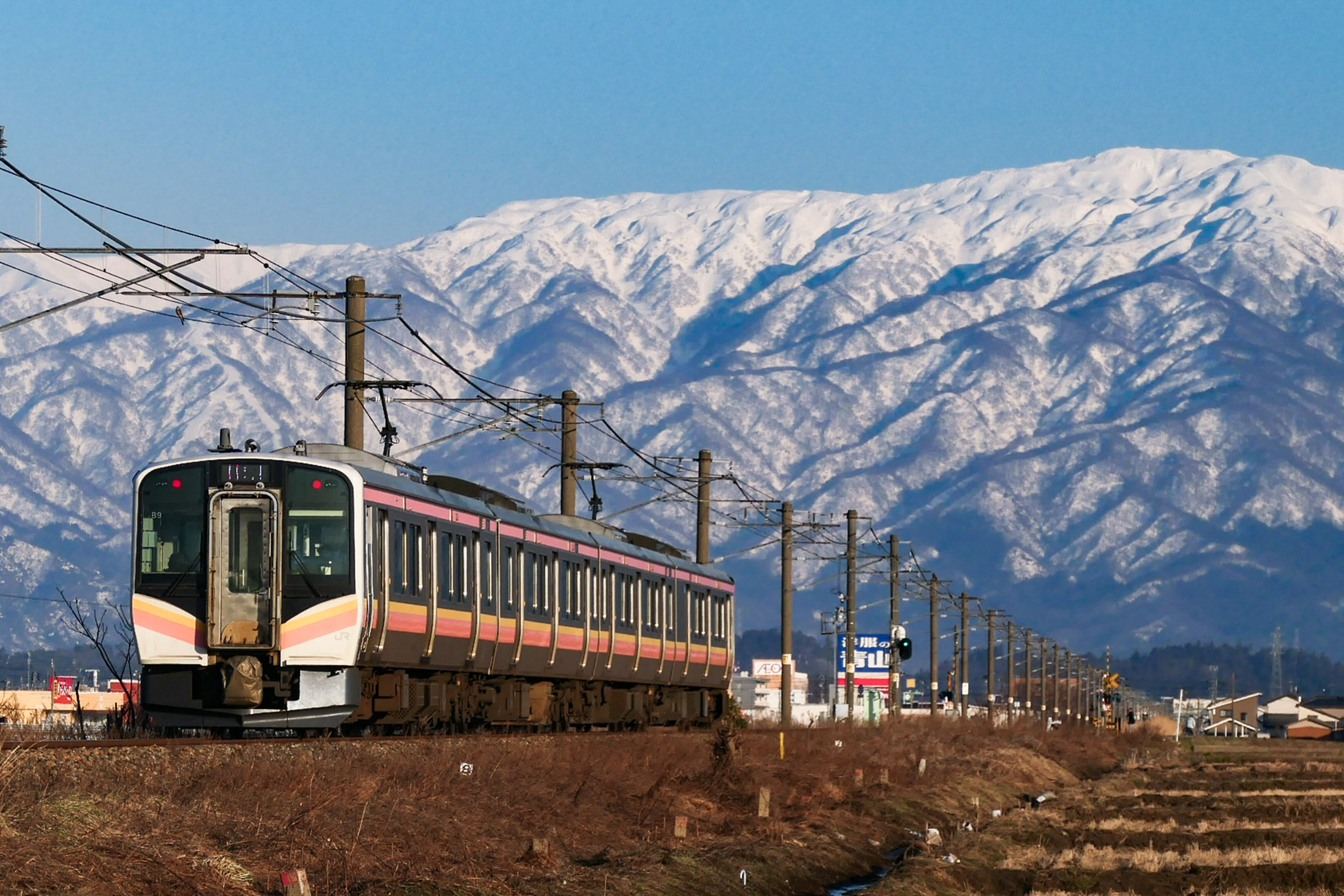
- E129 series EMU, February 2026

Overview
- Native name: 白新線
- Locale: Niigata Prefecture
- Termini: Niigata; Shibata
- Stations: 10

Service
- Type: Heavy rail
- Operator(s): JR East

History
- Opened: 1952; 74 years ago

Technical
- Line length: 27.3 km (17.0 mi)
- Track gauge: 1,067 mm (3 ft 6 in)
- Electrification: 1,500 V DC overhead catenary
Route map

The Hakushin Line (白新線, Hakushin-sen) is a Japanese railway line which runs between Niigata and Shibata stations in the cities of Niigata and Shibata in Niigata Prefecture. It is part of the East Japan Railway Company (JR East) network.

== Basic data ==
- Operators, distances:
  - East Japan Railway Company (JR East) (Services and tracks)
- Niigata – Shibata: 27.3 km (17.0 mi)
  - Japan Freight Railway Company (JR Freight) (Services only)
- Kami-Nuttari Junction – Shibata: 25.4 km (15.8 mi)
- Double-tracking: Niigata – Niizaki
- Railway signalling: ATS-Ps

== Services ==
Stations of Hakushin Line

Limited express, Rapid

As of March 2018, the following services are operated.

Name	Route	Service frequency (daily)
Limited Express Inaho	Niigata – Shibata – Sakata/Akita (Uetsu Main Line)	7 return trips
Rapid Benibana	Niigata – Shibata – Yonezawa (Yonesaka Line)	1 return trip
Rapid Rakuraku-Train-Murakami	Niigata – Shibata – Murakami (Uetsu Main Line)	1 down trip in evening
Rapid	Niigata – Shibata – Murakami (Uetsu Main Line)	1 down trip in morning, 1 up trip in evening
Rapid Kirakira Uetsu	Niigata – Shibata – Sakata (Uetsu Main Line)	1 return trip (only weekends)

Local
Niigata - Toyosaka: every 20 minutes
Toyosaka - Shibata: every 60 minutes (every 20 minutes during peaks)

== Station list ==
- All stations are located in Niigata Prefecture.

Station	Japanese	Distance (km)		Inaho /Rapid	Transfers		Location
Station	Japanese	Between stations	Total	Inaho /Rapid	Transfers		Location
Niigata	新潟	-	0.0	●	Jōetsu Shinkansen; ■Shinetsu Main Line; ■Echigo Line	∥	Chūō-ku, Niigata
Higashi-Niigata	東新潟	5.0	5.0	｜		∥	Higashi-ku, Niigata
Ōgata	大形	2.0	7.0	｜		∥	Higashi-ku, Niigata
Niizaki	新崎	2.6	9.6	｜		∨	Kita-ku, Niigata
Hayadōri	早通	1.9	11.5	｜		◇	Kita-ku, Niigata
Toyosaka	豊栄	3.5	15.0	●		◇	Kita-ku, Niigata
Kuroyama	黒山	3.0	18.0	｜		◇	Kita-ku, Niigata
Sasaki	佐々木	3.0	21.0	｜		◇	Shibata
Nishi-Shibata	西新発田	3.3	24.3	｜		◇	Shibata
Shibata	新発田	3.0	27.3	●	■Uetsu Main Line	◇	Shibata

Symbols:

- ◇ - Single-track; station where trains can pass
- ^ - Double-track section starts from this point
- ∥ - Double-track
- ∨ - Single-track section starts from this point

== Rolling stock ==
=== Present ===
- E129 series 2/4-car EMUs (since December 2014)
- E653 series 7-car EMUs (Inaho limited express, since September 2013)
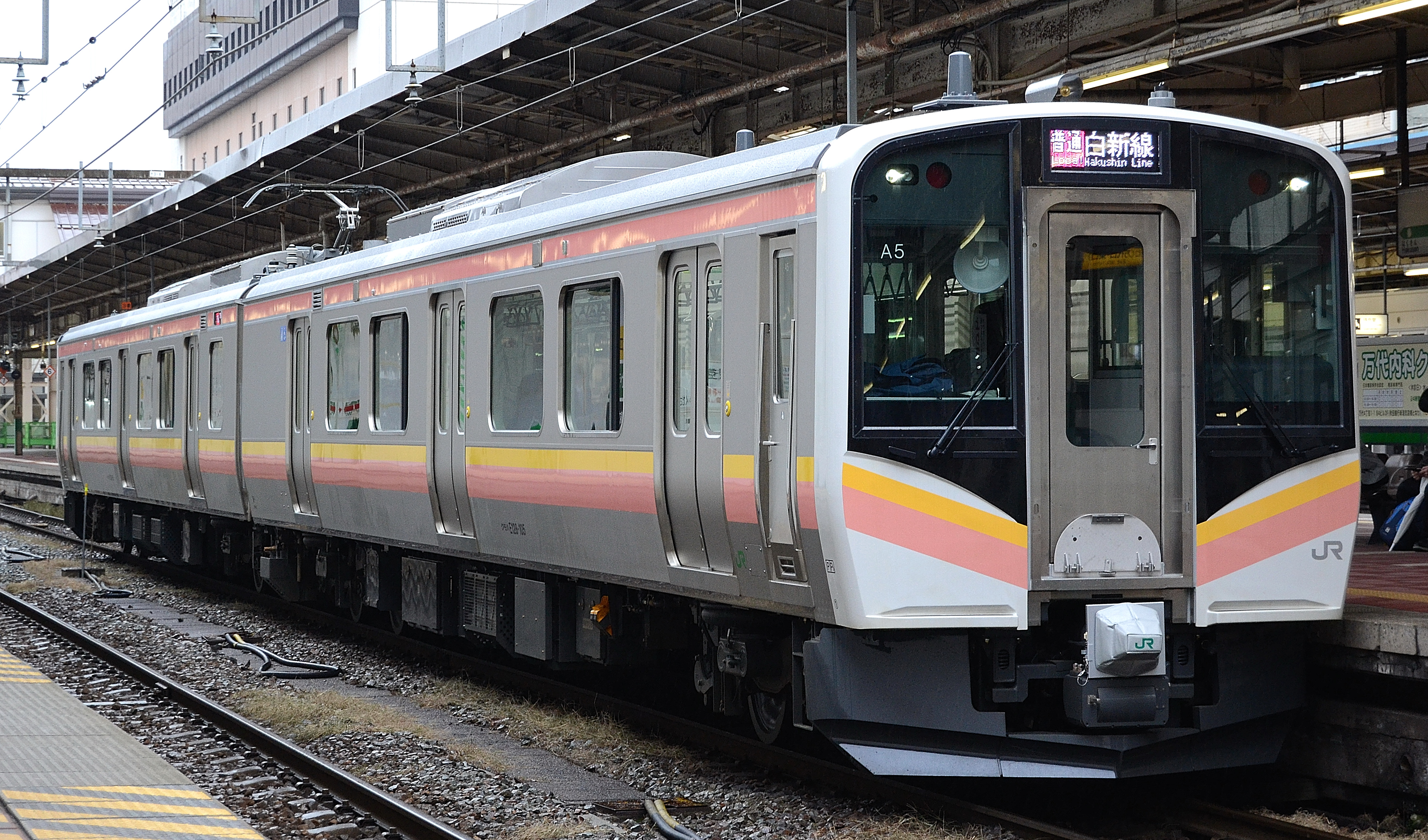
E129 series

=== Former ===
- 115 series 2/3/4-car EMUs (until March 2018)
- E127 series 2-car EMUs (until March 2015)
- 485 series 6-car EMUs (Inaho, until July 2014)
- 165 series
- 70 series
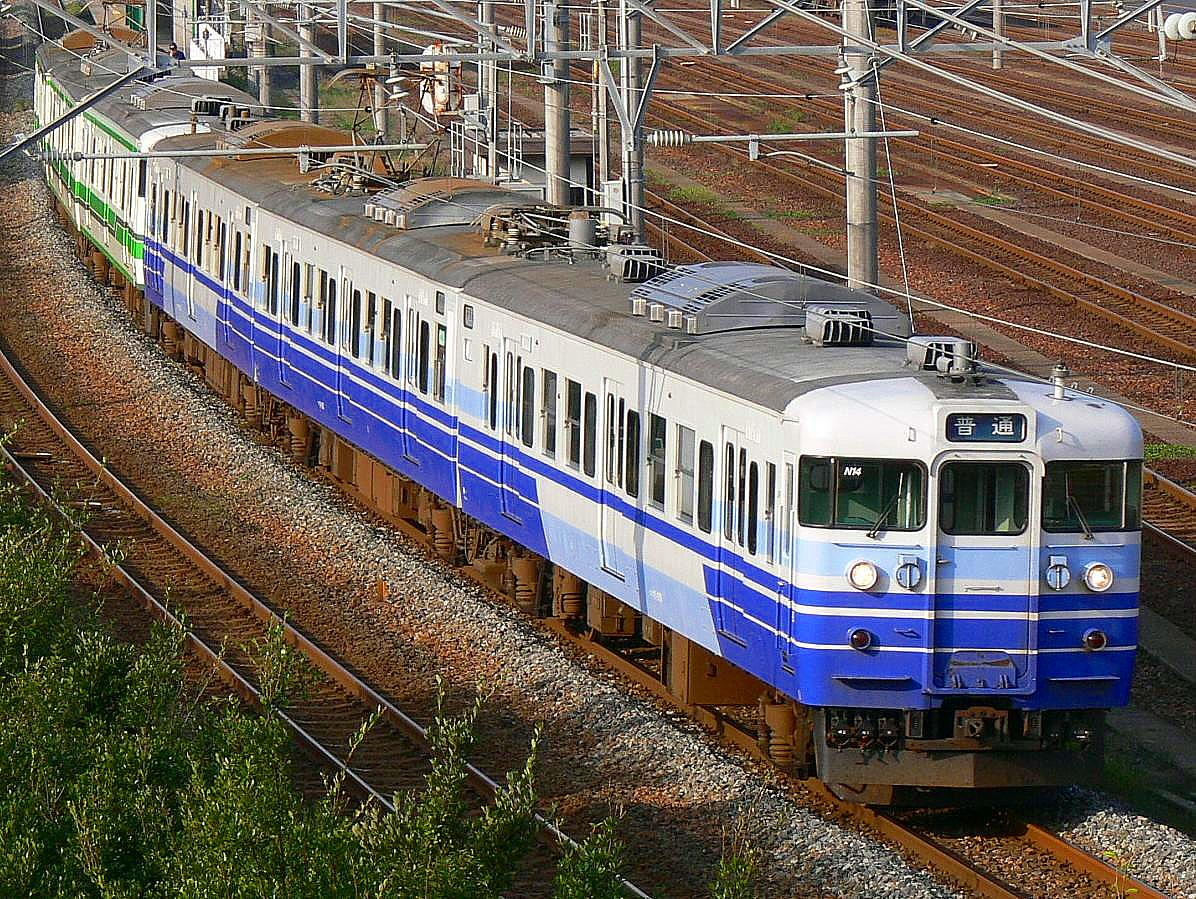
115 series

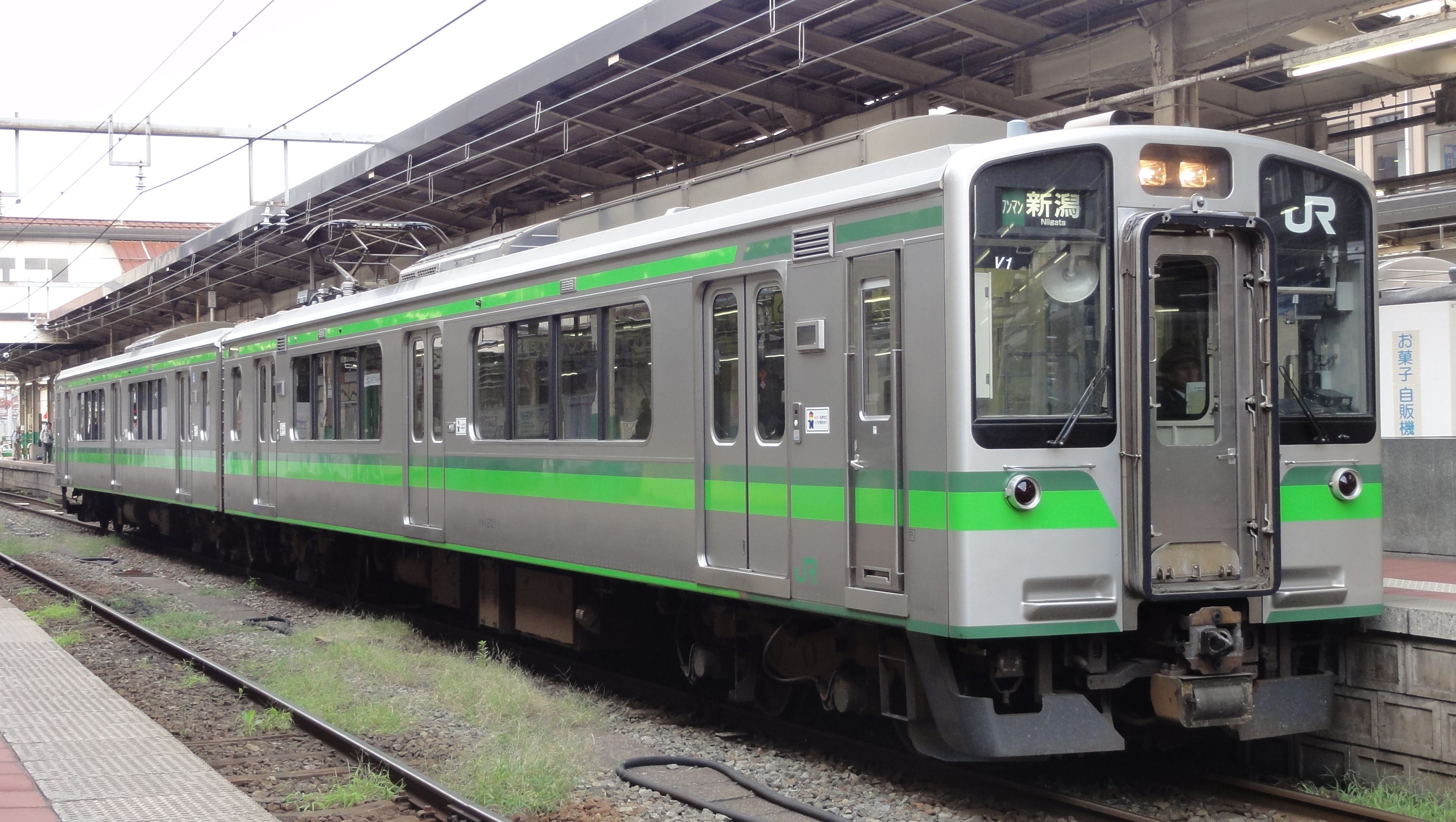
E127 series

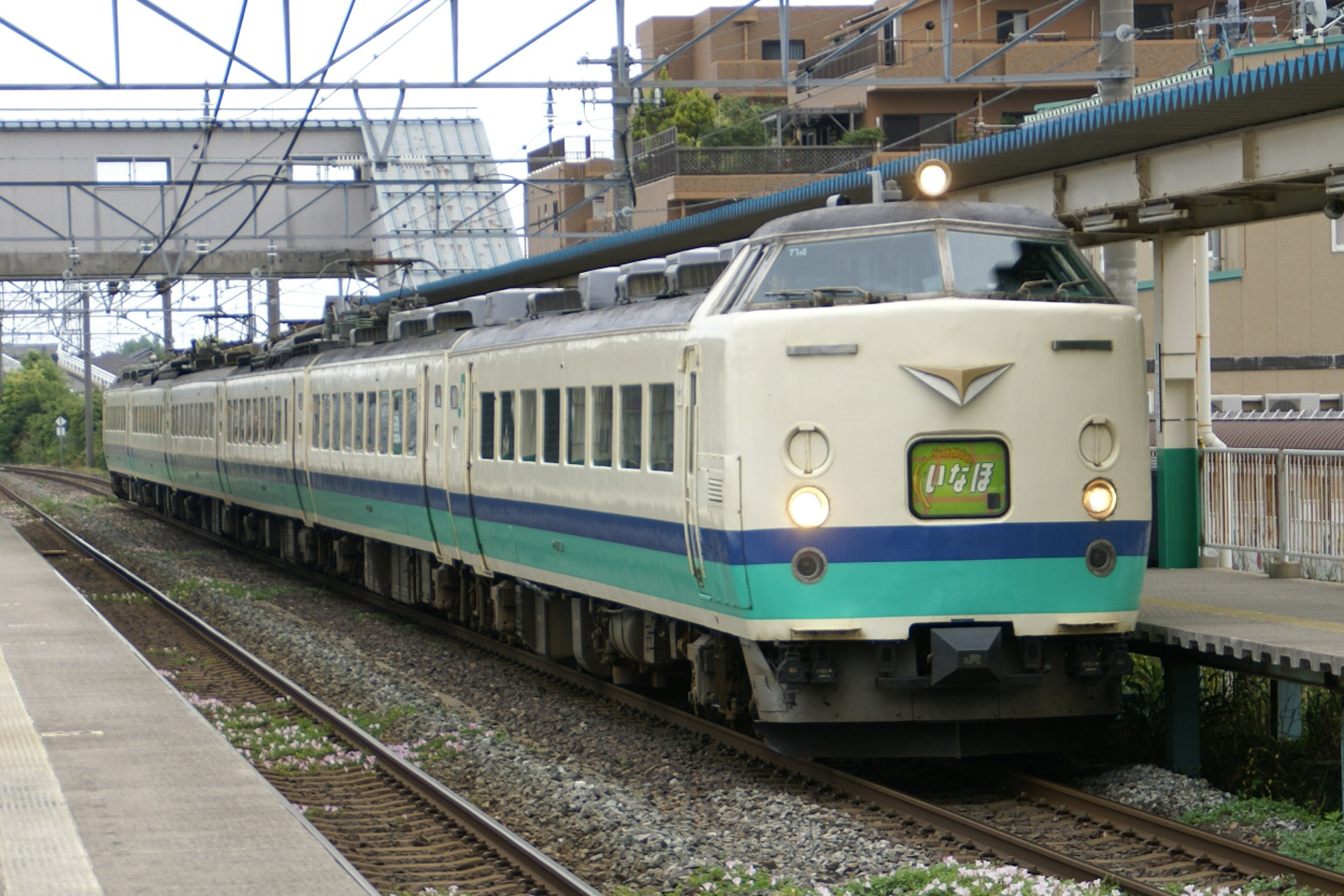
485 series EMU passing through Higashi-Niigata Station on an Inaho service, May 2008

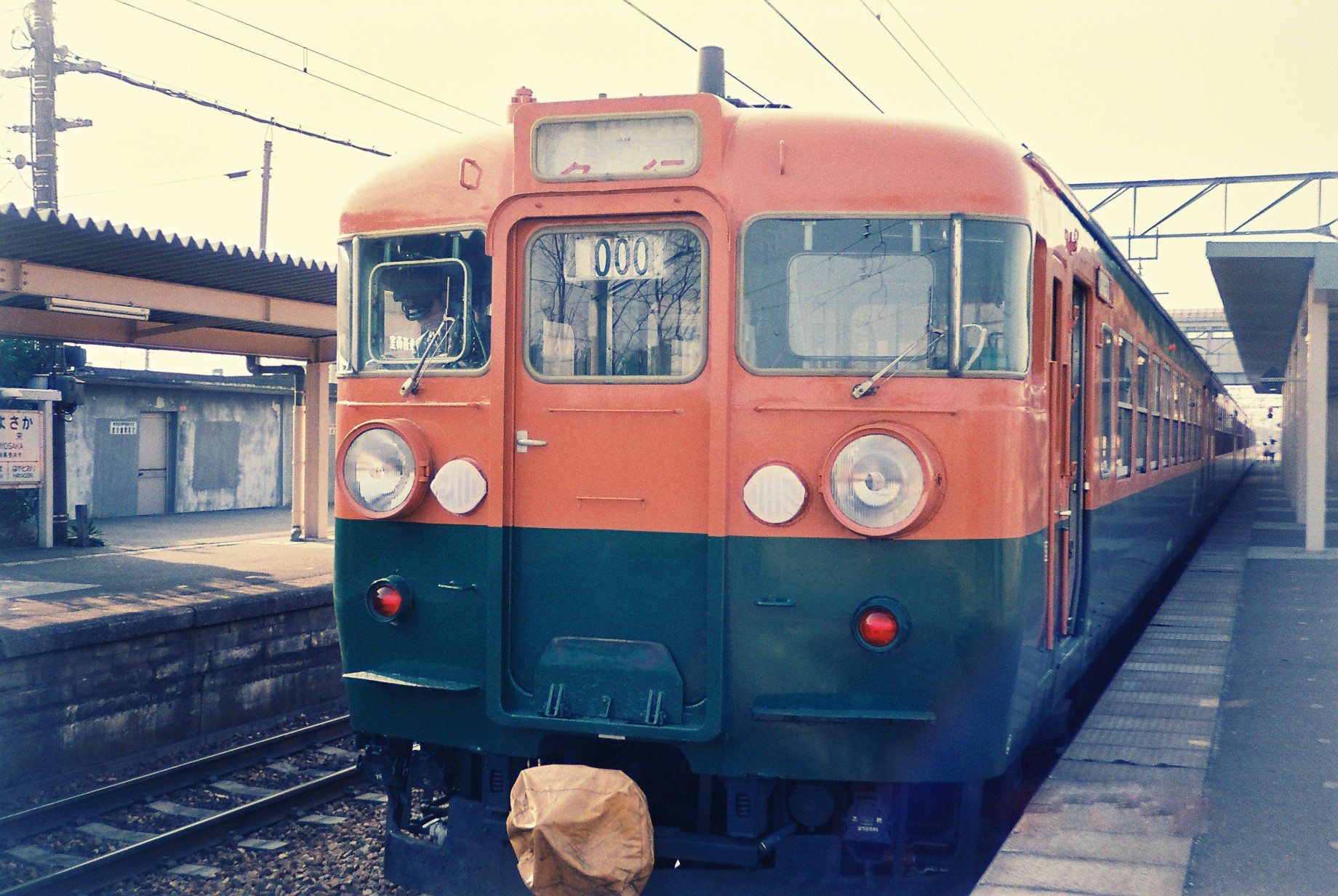
165 series

== History ==
The first section opened on 23 December 1952 was the 12.3 km line between Shibata Station and Kuzutsuka Station (now Toyosaka Station). On 15 April 1956, the line was extended 14.9 km from Kuzutsuka to Niigata.

The line was electrified at 1,500 V DC in 1972, and double-tracked in sections between 1978 and 1981.
