= Hayadōri Station =

Railway station in Niigata, Japan

Hayadōri Station 早通駅
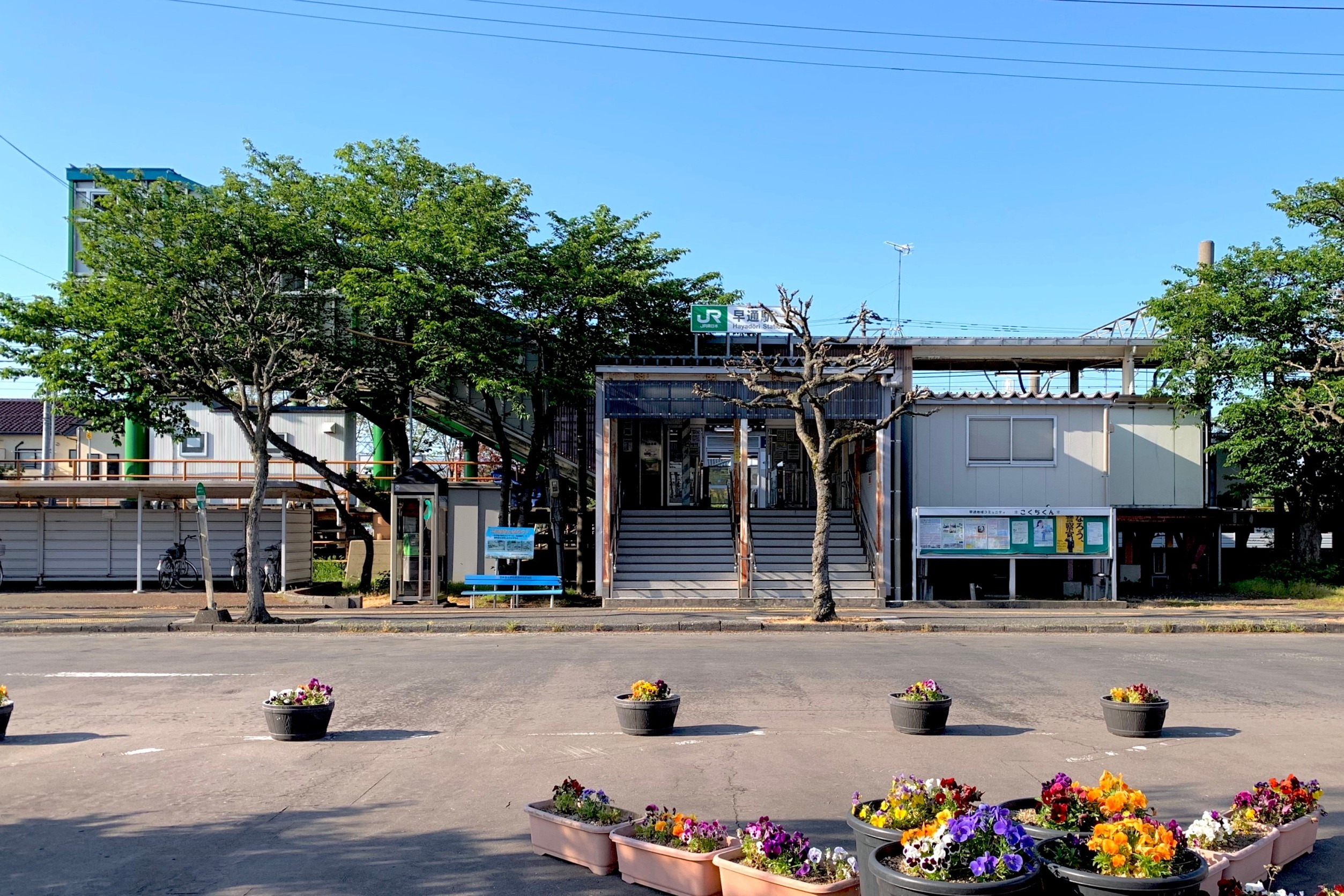
- Hayadōri Station south exit, May 2020

General information
- Location: 1 Hayadōri-Minami, Kita-ku, Niigata-shi, Niigata-ken 950-3375; Japan
- Coordinates: 37°55′15.7″N 139°10′42.2″E
- Operator: JR East
- Line: ■ Hakushin Line
- Distance: 11.5 km from Niigata
- Platforms: 2 side platforms
- Tracks: 2

Other information
- Status: Staffed
- Website: Official website

History
- Opened: 11 February 1957

Passengers
- FY2017: 1,092 daily

Services
| Preceding station | JR East | Following station |
|---|---|---|
| Niizaki towards Niigata | Hakushin Line | Toyosaka towards Shibata |
Location
- Location within JR Hakushin Line Location within Japan

Hayadōri Station (早通駅, Hayadōri-eki) is a train station in Kita-ku, Niigata, Niigata Prefecture, Japan, operated by East Japan Railway Company (JR East).

== Lines ==
Hayadōri Station is served by the Hakushin Line, and is 11.5 kilometers from the starting point of the line at Niigata Station.

== Layout ==
The station consists of two ground-level opposed side platforms, serving two tracks. There is a footbridge outside the gate.

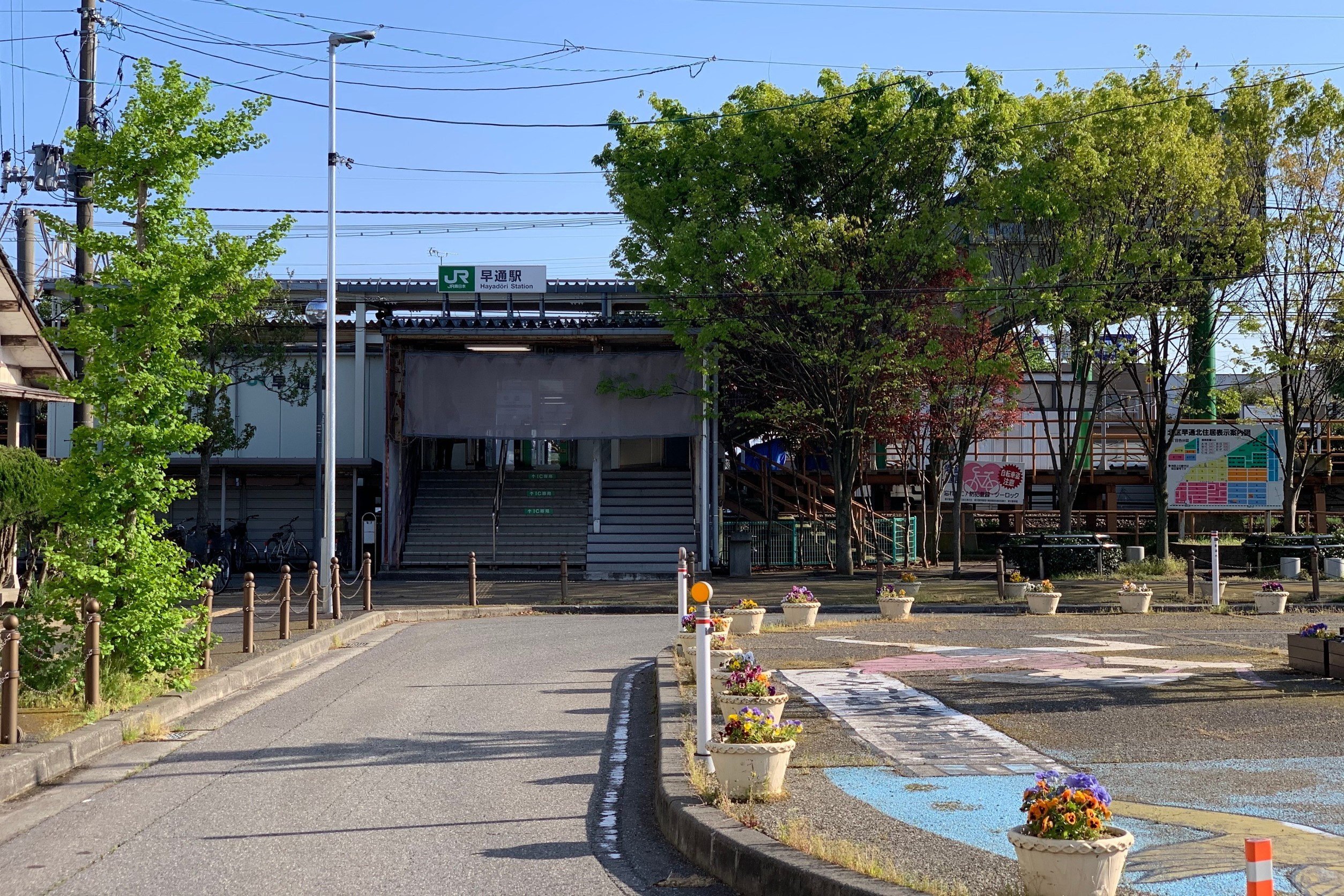
Hayadōri Station north exit, May 2020

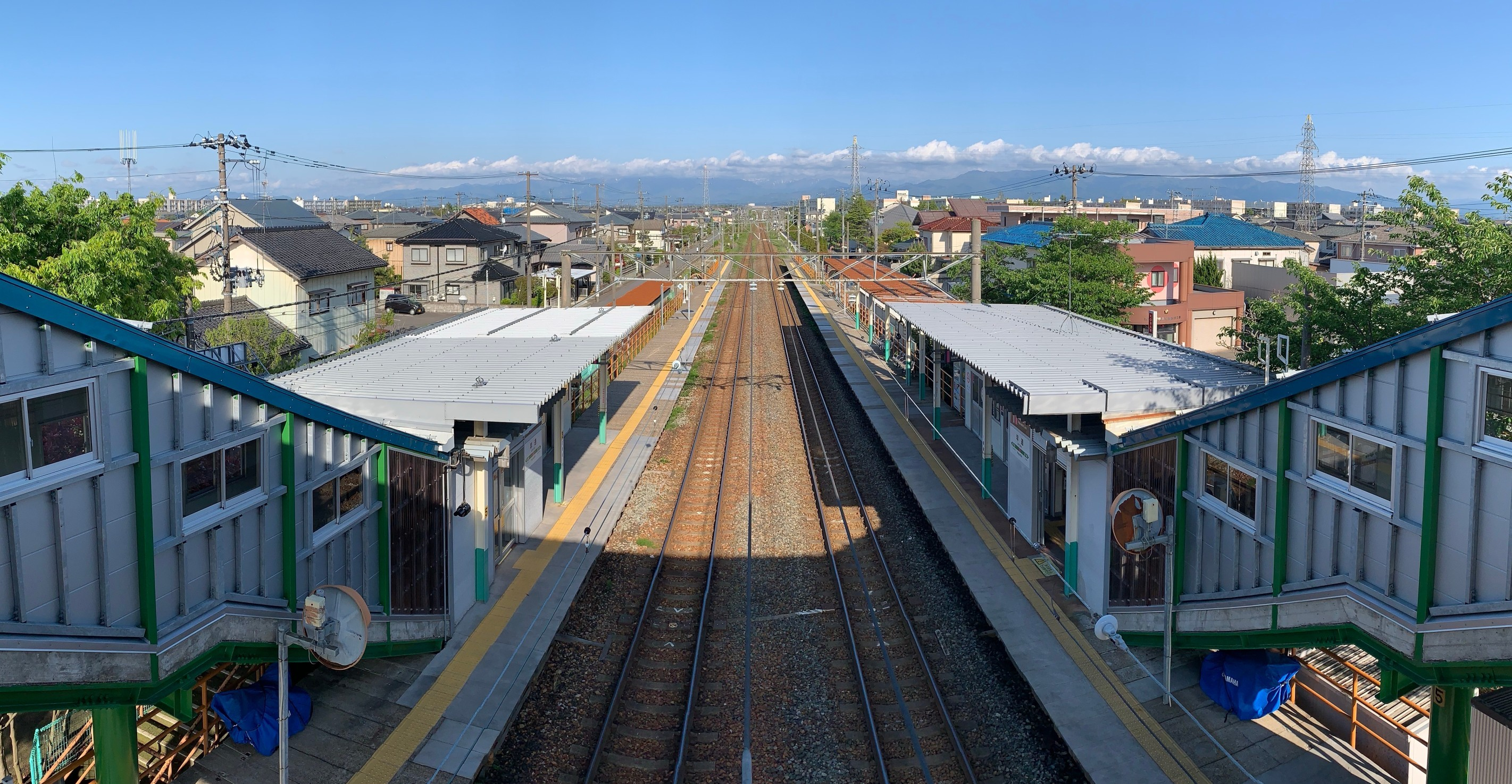
Platforms, May 2020

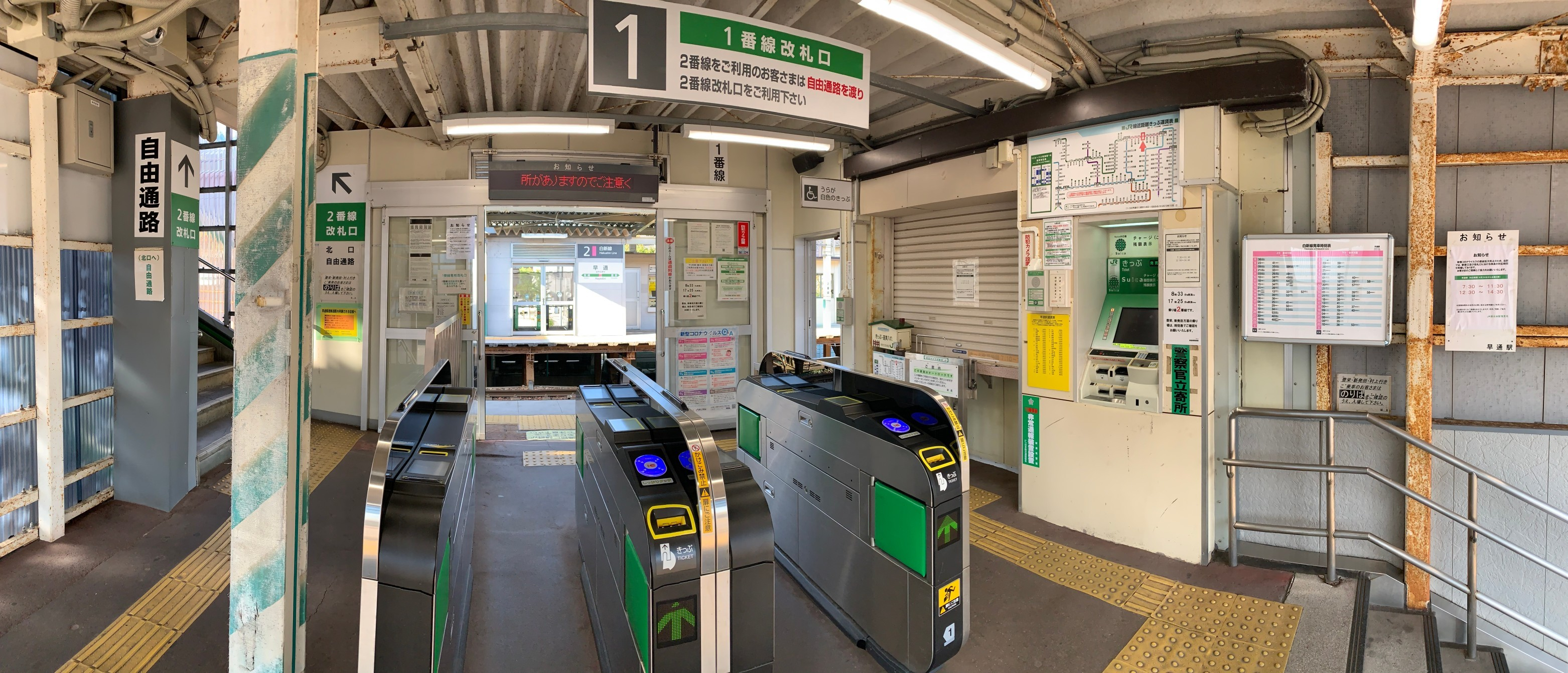
Gate of platform No.1, May 2020

=== Platforms ===
| 1 | ■ Hakushin Line | for Shibata and Niigata (bidirectional) |
| 2 | ■ Hakushin Line | for Shibata and Niigata (bidirectional) |

== History ==
The station opened on 11 February 1957. It was rebuilt on 1 October 1970 on a location 200 meters further from Niizaki Station. With the privatization of Japanese National Railways (JNR) on 1 April 1987, the station came under the control of JR East.

== Passenger statistics ==
In fiscal 2017, the station was used by an average of 1092 passengers daily (boarding passengers only).

== Surrounding area ==
- Hayadōri Middle School

== See also ==
- List of railway stations in Japan
