= Toyosaka Station =

Railway station in Niigata, Japan

Toyosaka Station 豊栄駅
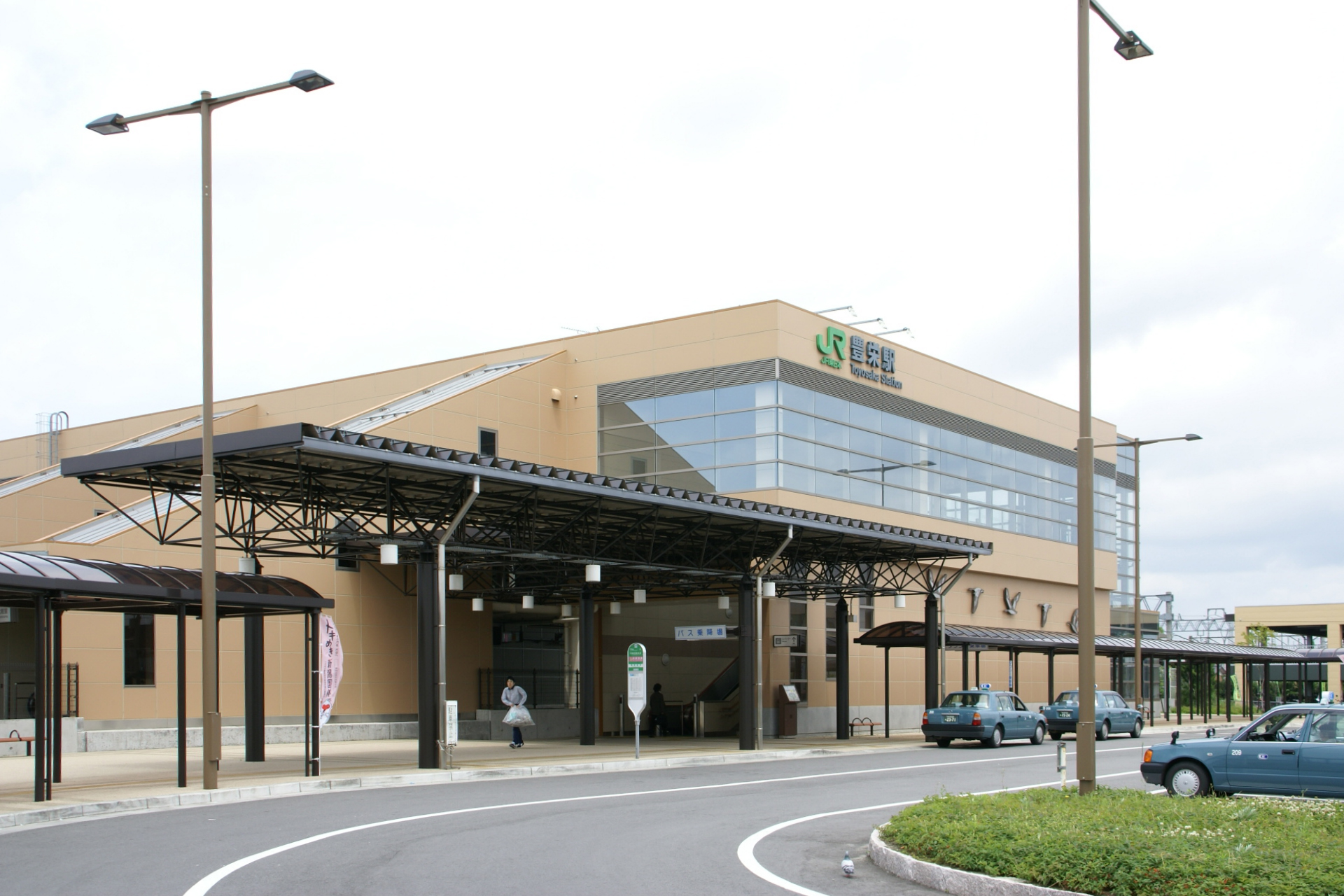
- South side of Toyosaka Station, May 2008

General information
- Location: 1 Hakushin-cho, Kita-ku, Niigata-shi, Niigata-ken 950-3325; Japan
- Coordinates: 37°55′11.05″N 139°12′56.3″E
- Operator: JR East
- Line: ■ Hakushin Line
- Distance: 15.0 km from Niigata
- Platforms: 1 side + 1 island platform
- Tracks: 3

Other information
- Status: Staffed ("Midori no Madoguchi")
- Website: Official website

History
- Opened: 23 December 1952
- Former names: Kuzutsuka (until 1976)

Passengers
- FY2017: 3,681 daily

Services
Preceding station	JR East	Following station
Niigata Terminus	Inaho	Shibata towards Akita
Hayadōri towards Niigata	Hakushin Line	Kuroyama towards Shibata
Location
- Location within JR Hakushin Line Location within Japan

Toyosaka Station (豊栄駅, Toyosaka-eki) is a railway station on the Hakushin Line in Kita-ku, Niigata, Japan, operated by East Japan Railway Company (JR East).

== Lines ==
Toyosaka Station is served by the Hakushin Line between Niigata and Shibata, and is 15.0 kilometers from the starting point of the line at Niigata Station.

== Station layout ==
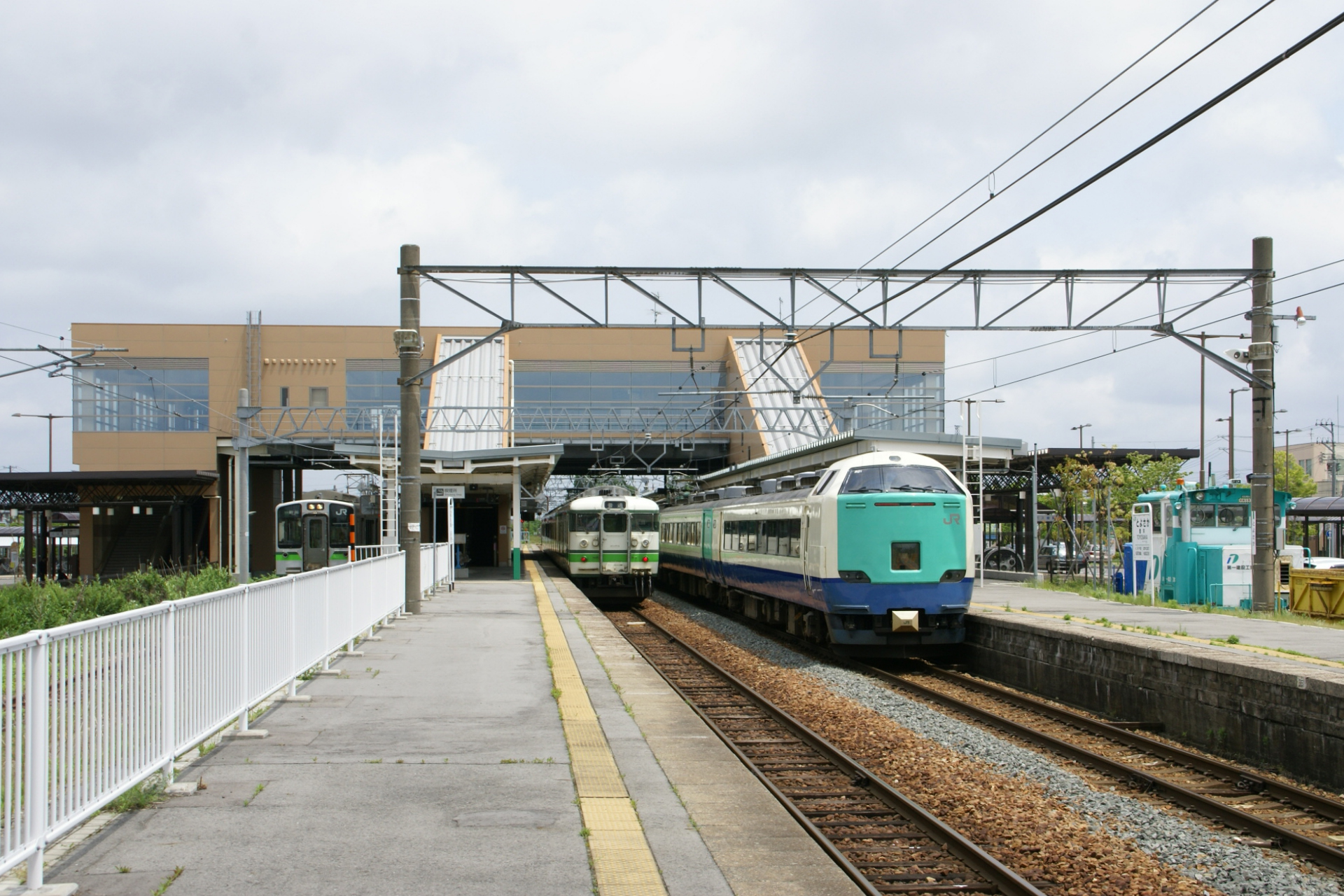
View of station platforms with platform 3 on left, May 2008

The station consists of a side platform (1) and an island platform (2/3) serving three tracks, with the station situated above the tracks. The station has a "Midori no Madoguchi" staffed ticket office.

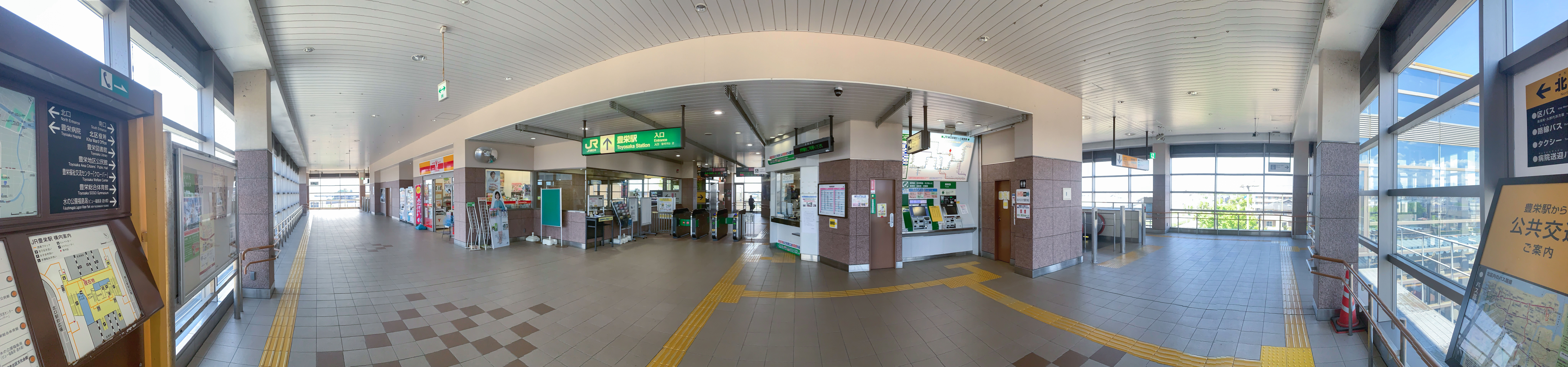
Station interior, May 2019

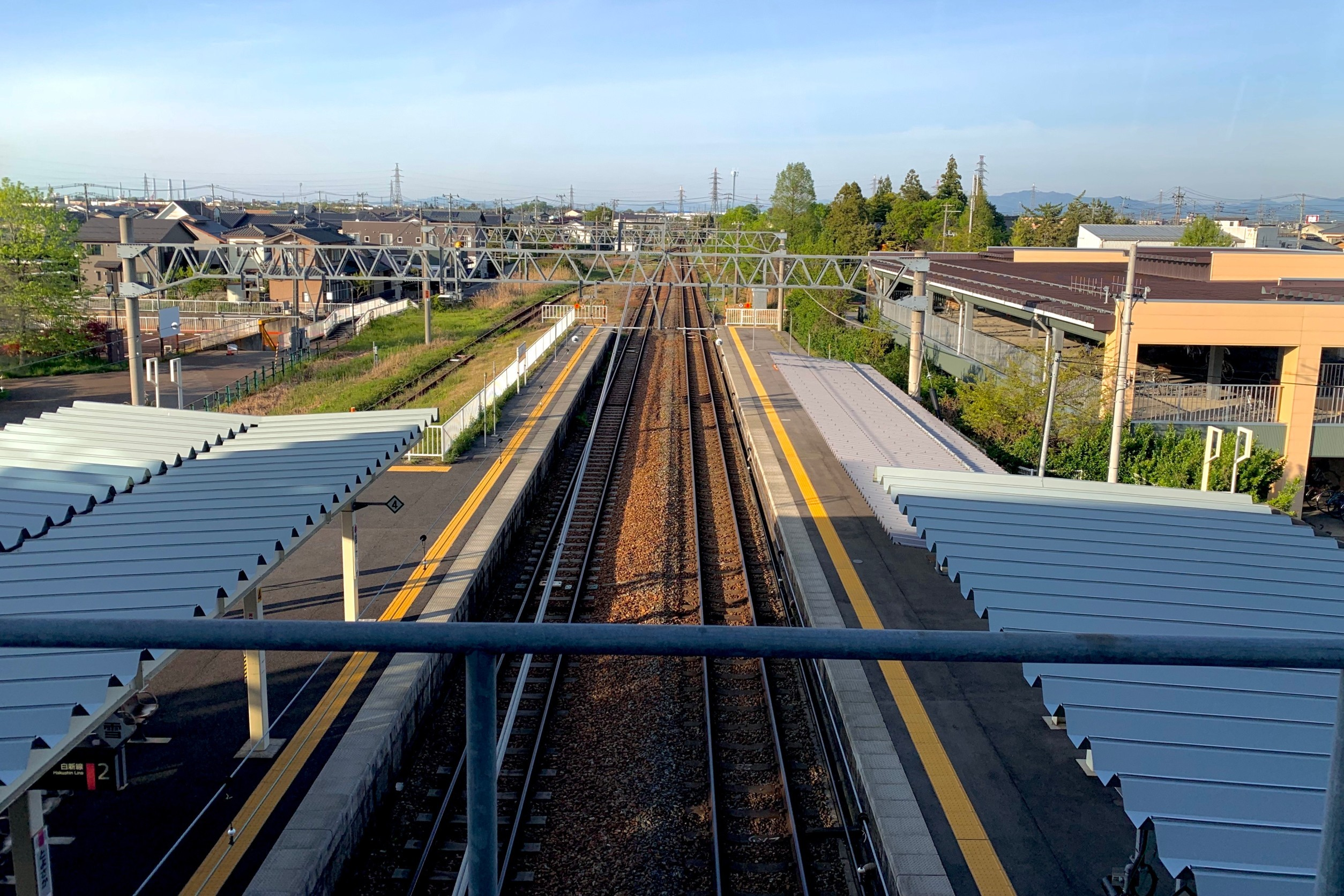
Platform (May 2020)

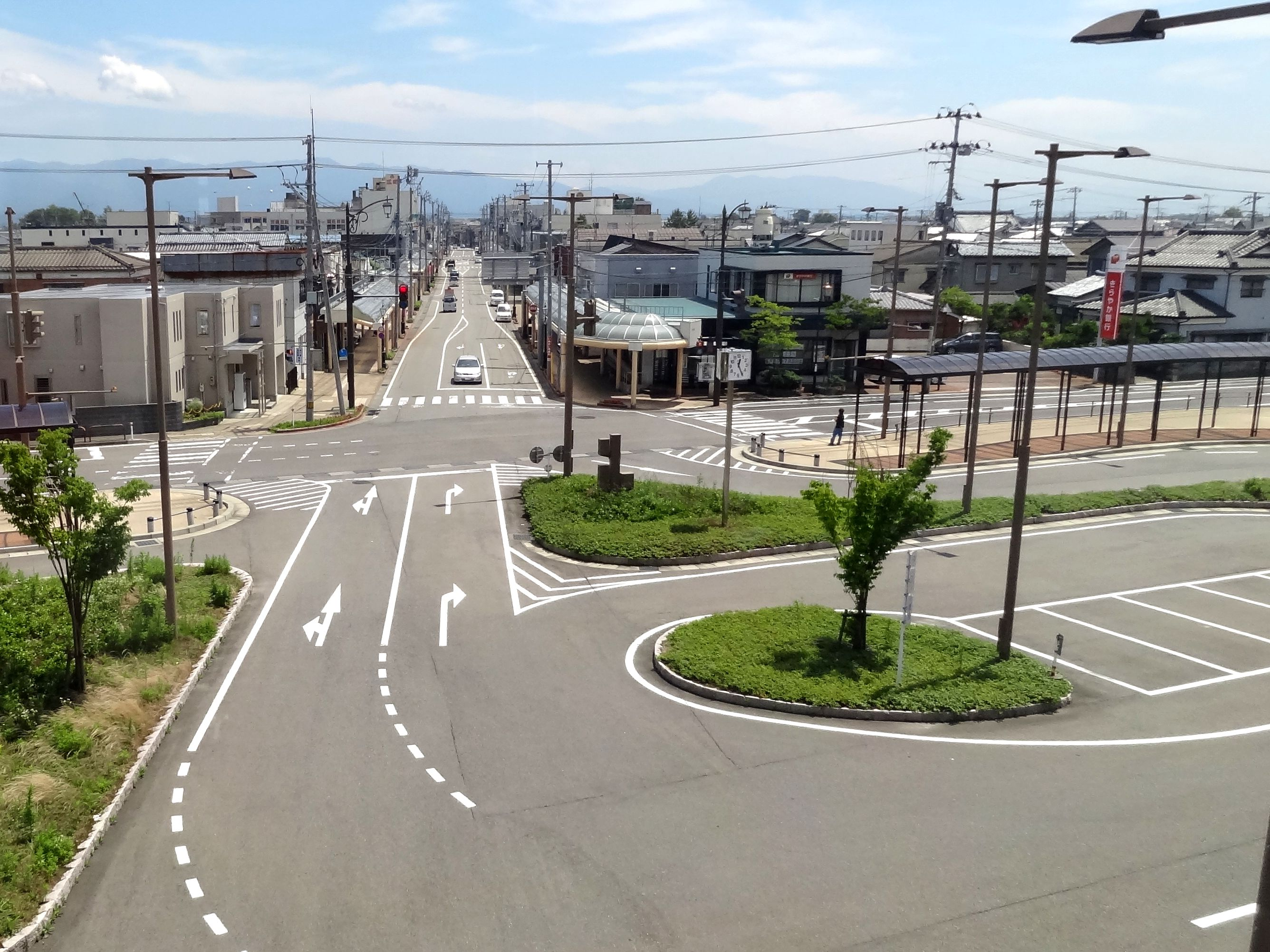
View from the south exit

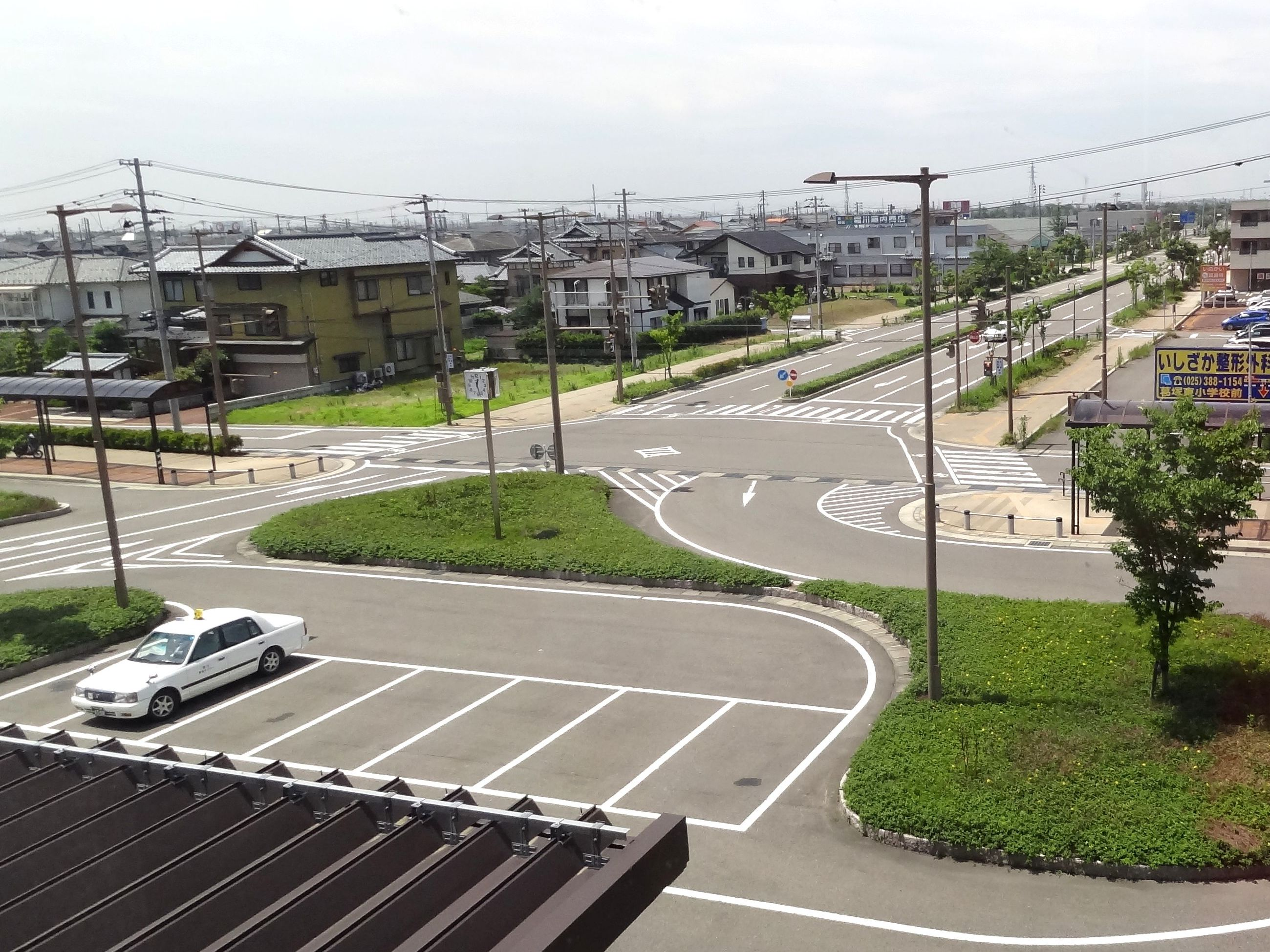
View from the north exit

=== Platforms ===
1/2	■ Hakushin Line	for Shibata, Niigata
3	■ Hakushin Line	for Niigata

Platform 3 is predominantly used for local Hakushin Line services terminating at this station.

== History ==
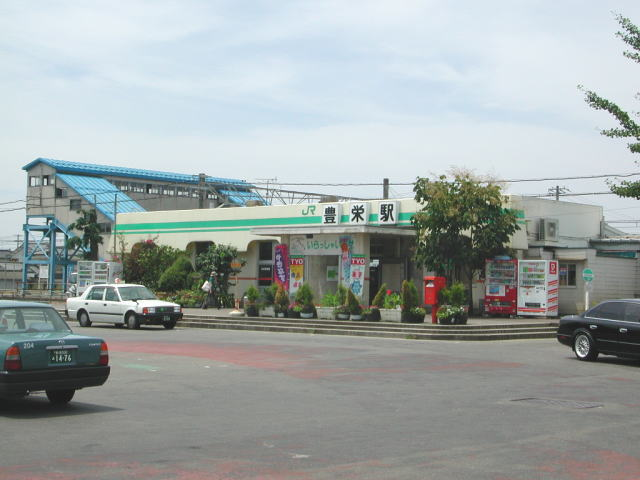
Former building (April 2004)

The station opened on 23 December 1952 as Kuzutsuka Station (葛塚駅, Kuzutsuka-eki) , forming the terminus of Hakushin Line from Shibata. It was renamed Toyosaka Station on 1 April 1976. With the privatization of JNR on 1 April 1987, the station came under the control of JR East.

From 22 March 1997, some limited express Inaho services began stopping at Toyosaka. A new station building opened on 25 March 2006.

== Passenger statistics ==
In fiscal 2017, the station was used by an average of 3,681 passengers daily (boarding passengers only).

Fiscal year	Daily average
2000	3,285
2005	3,157
2010	3,581
2013	3,761

== Surrounding area ==
- Toyosaka Post Office
- Kita-ku Ward Office
- Fukushimagata Lagoon Park

== See also ==
- List of railway stations in Japan
