= List of dams in Niigata Prefecture =

The following is a list of dams in Niigata Prefecture, Japan.

== List ==
Name	Location	Opened	Height (meters)	Image
Aburumagawa Dam		1986	93.5	
Agekawa Dam			19	
Akaiwa Dam		1989	76.5	
Asagawara Dam			37	
Futai Dam		1978	87	
Gejogawa Dam		1973	31	
Hayade Dam				
Hiraishigawashusui Dam				
Hirokami Dam		2011	42.1	
Iwafune Dam		1961	30.2	
Johara Dam		1994	27.4	
Kajigawachisui Dam		1974	106.5	
Kajikawa Dam			46	
Kakizakigawa Dam		2003	54	
Kanose Dam			32.6	
Kariyatagawa Dam		1980	83.5	
Kasabori Dam		1964		
Ketto Dam		1972	55.3	
Kassa Dam			90	
Kassagawa Dam			20.5	
Kawanishi Dam		1980	43	
Kiyotaki Dam				
Konoyama Dam			33	
Kuromata Dam			24.5	
Kuromatagawa No.1 Dam			91	
Kuromatagawa No.2 Dam			82.5	
Miomote Dam			82.5	
Miyanaka Dam				
Niibo Dam		1958	33.2	
Niibo No.2 Dam		1991	61.4	
Ogura Dam		2006	64	
Oishi Dam			87	
Okumiomote Dam			116	
Okutadami Dam		1961	157	
Onogawa Dam		1979	47	
Otani Dam			75.5	
Oyachi Dam		1989	23.2	
Sabaishigawa Dam		1973	37	
Sagurigawa Dam			119.5	
Saruta Dam			48.5	
Sasagamine Dam			48.6	
Sawata Dam		1988	45.6	
Shozenji Dam			47	
Tainai Dam				
Tainaigawa Dam		1976	93	
Takanosu Dam		2000	28	
Toyomi Dam			34.2	
Uchinokura Dam		1973	82.5	
Yabugami Dam			23	
Yamamoto Dam				
Yamamoto No. 2 Dam			42.4	

== See also ==
- Media related to Dams in Niigata prefecture at Wikimedia Commons
