= Okukiyotsu Pumped Storage Power Station =

- Country: Japan
- Location: Yuzawa, Minamiuonuma, Niigata Prefecture
- Coordinates: 36°50′37.00″N 138°45′58.00″E
- Status: Operational
- Operator(s): J-Power

Upper reservoir
- Creates: Tashiro lake
- Total capacity: 11,400,000 m^{3} (9,200 acre⋅ft) (effective)

Lower reservoir
- Creates: Kiyotsu river
- Total capacity: 11,400,000 m^{3} (9,200 acre⋅ft) (effective)

Power Station
- Hydraulic head: 470 m (1,540 ft)
- Pump-generators: No. 1: 4 x 260 MW reversible Francis turbines No. 2: 2 x 310 MW reversible Francis turbines
- Installed capacity: 1,600 MW (2,100,000 hp)

The Okukiyotsu Pumped Storage Power Station (Japanese: 奥清津発電所, Hepburn: Okukiyotsu Hatsudensho) No. 1 and No. 2 are two large pumped-storage hydroelectric power plants in Yuzawa, Minamiuonuma, Niigata Prefecture, Japan. With a combined installed capacity of 1,600 megawatts (2,100,000 hp), the system is the third largest pumped-storage power station in Japan.

The facilities are run by Electric Power Development Company (J-Power). Like most pumped-storage facilities, the power station uses two reservoirs, releasing and pumping as the demand rises and falls. Tashiro lake, formed by the Kassa Dam, is the upper artificial reservoir, while Futai Dam on the Kiyotsu river forms the lower reservoir. Both dams are rockfill type dams, with a height of 90 m and 87 m, respectively. The reservoirs were built between 1972 and 1978.

Okukiyotsu No. 1 is the first plant to be built on the site, and employs four 260 MW pump/generator units, for a total net capacity of 1000 MW. The maximum water flow is 260 cubic meters per second. Construction on the plant started in 1972 and it became operational between 1978 and 1982.

Okukiyotsu No. 2 is a later addition to the site. The plant is composed of two adjustable speed pump/generator units for a combined power capacity of 600 MW and a maximum water flow of 154 cubic meters per second. Adjustable speed units allow for a rapid variation of power levels during both pumping and generation. These were the highest hydraulic head adjustable speed units in the world. Construction of the second plant started in 1992 and it became operational in 1996. Both plants have an effective head of 470 m.

Some of the interior of the second power plant can be visited by the public. The Okky Museum, managed by J-Power, also provides models of the station and explicatory panels and media.

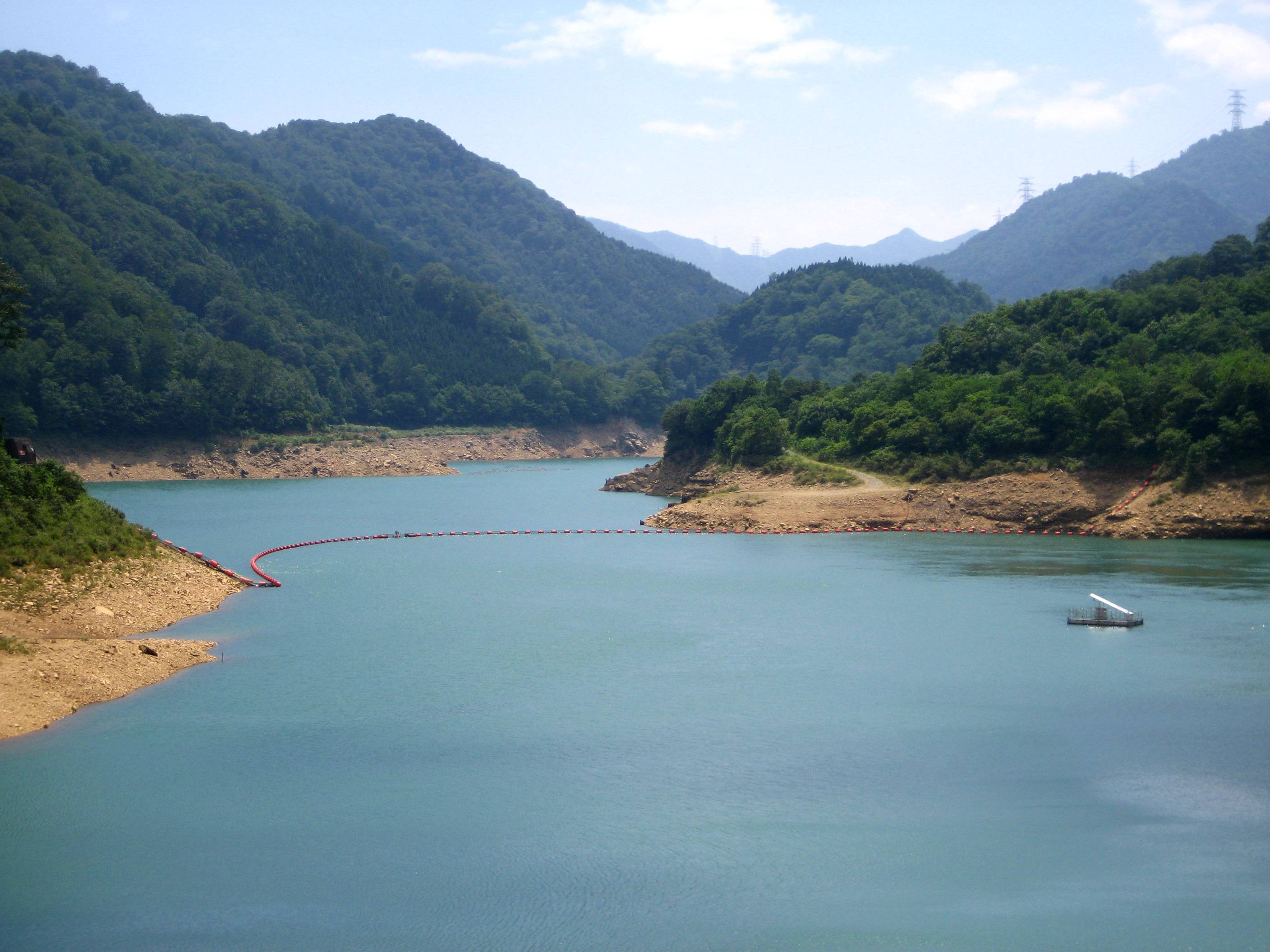
Futai Dam lake

Okukiyotsu power station

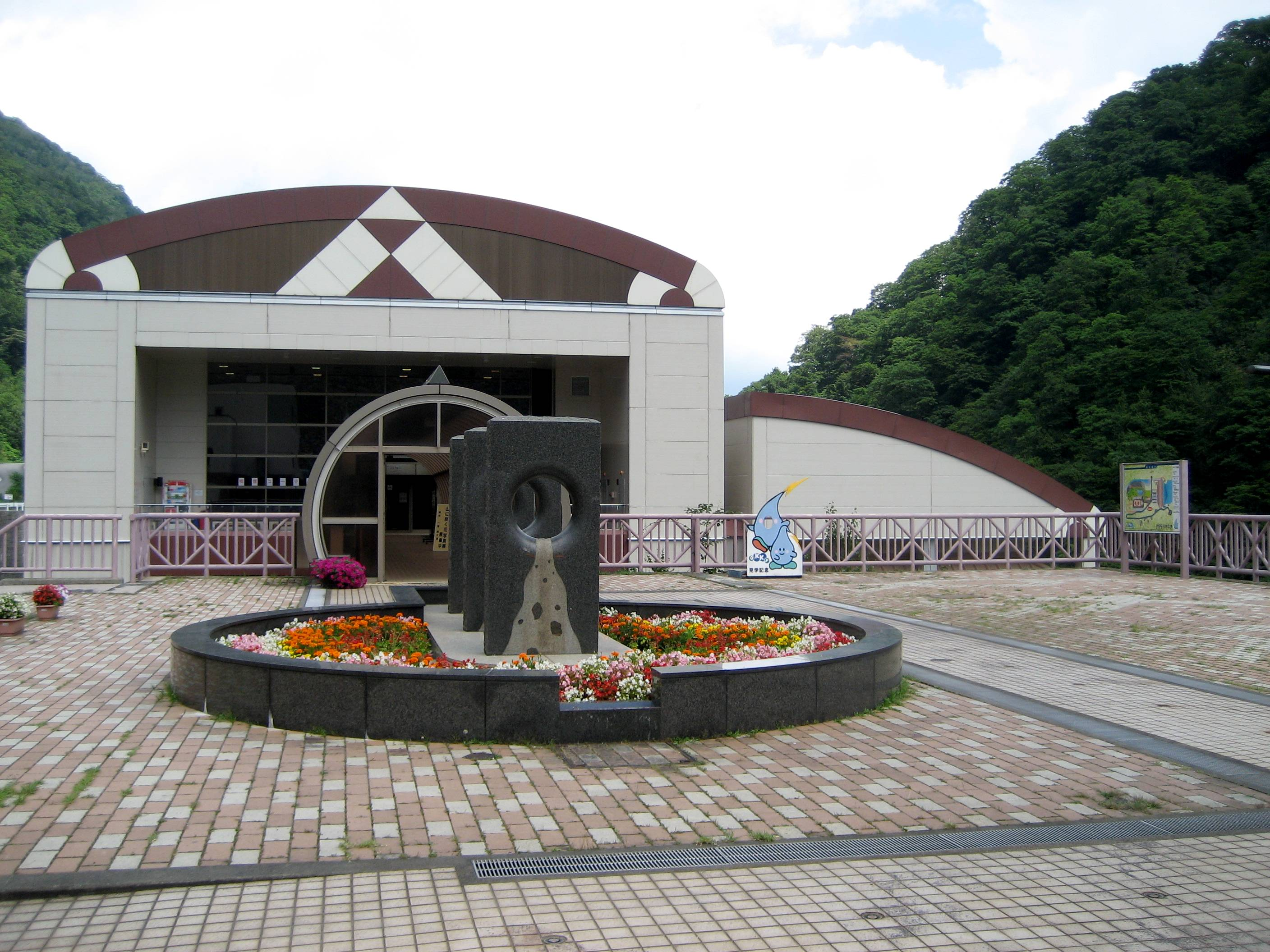
Okky museum

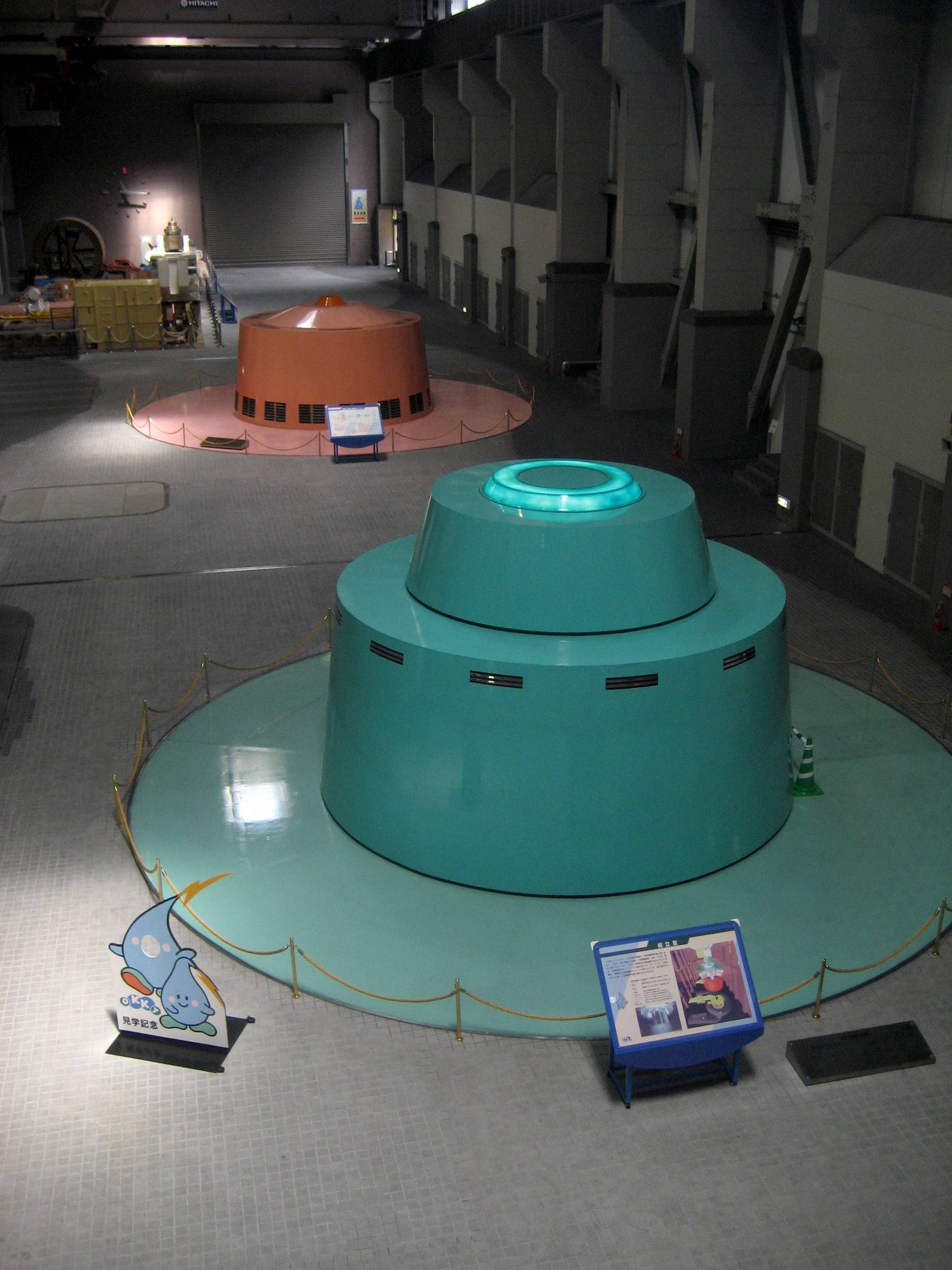
Okukiyotsu No. 2 power station interior, part of the Okky museum

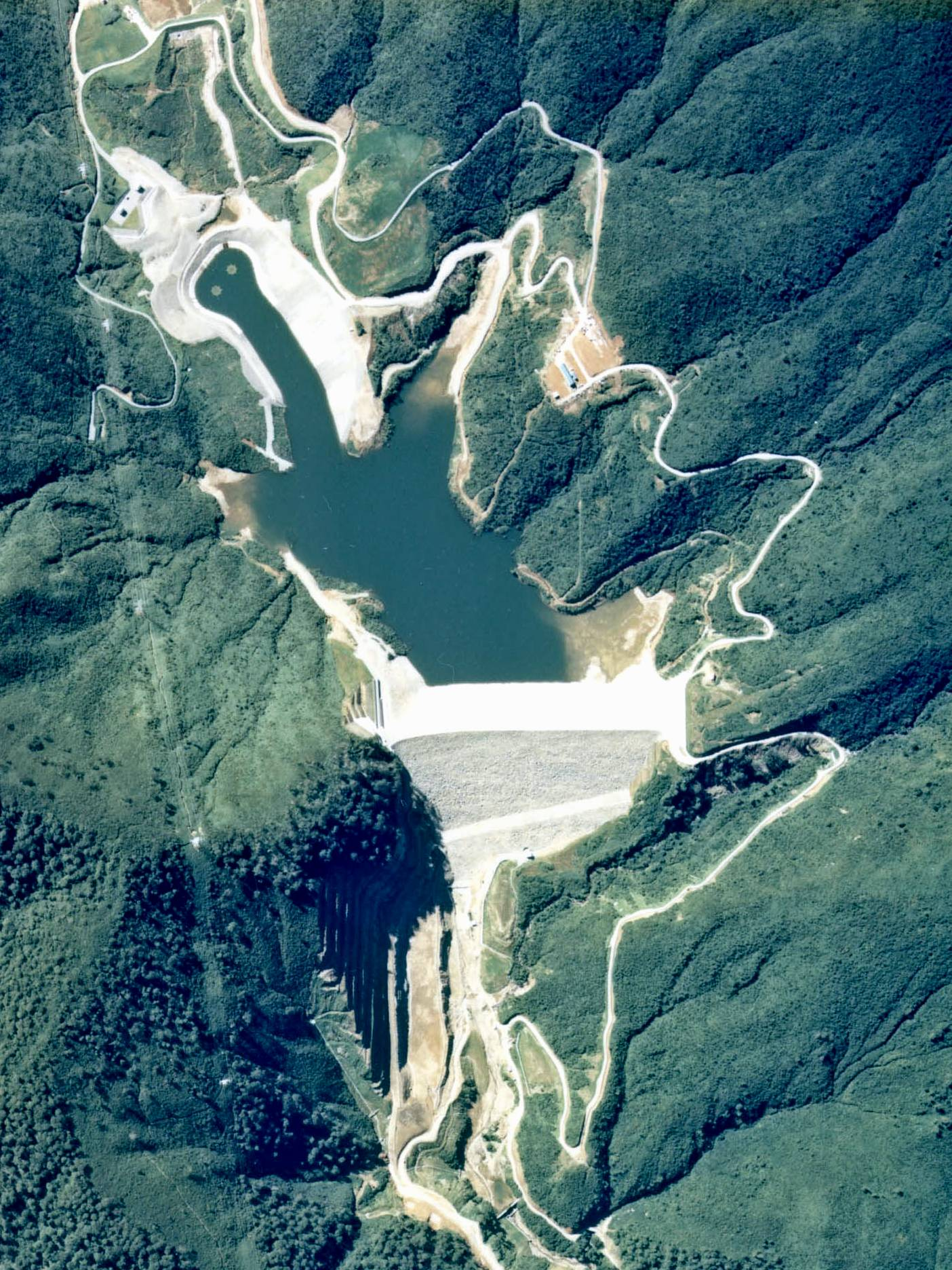
Upper reservoir and Kassa Dam under construction

== See also ==
- List of power stations in Japan
- Hydroelectricity in Japan
- List of pumped-storage hydroelectric power stations
