= Shinano River incident =

1922 massacre of Korean laborers

The Shinano River incident (信濃川朝鮮人虐殺事件, Shinanogawa Chōsenjin Gyakusatsu Jiken) was the massacre of up to 100 Korean laborers in July 1922 who were working for the Okura zaibatsu at the construction site of a power plant on the Shinano River.

== Background ==
Shin'etsu Electric Power Inc., later absorbed into the Tokyo Electric Light Company and finally the Tokyo Electric Power Company, started building hydroelectric plants in July 1922 including Nakatsu Power Plant #1 on the Nakatsu River which is a tributary of the Shinano River. The Okura zaibatsu was put in charge of constructing it. Over 1,200 construction workers were assembled, of whom over 600 were Koreans. Their strategy was to employ a large number of labourers at low wages who were detained in cramped, low-grade dormitories referred to as tako-beya, or "octopus rooms". Furthermore, the Okura group’s management believed that the labourers had a lazy work ethic and treated them violently.

== Massacre ==
In July 1922, dozens of Koreans who tried to escape the construction site were gunned down or otherwise killed by the plant foremen. The workers' bodies were then dipped in cement, and cast into the Shinano River.

The massacre was exposed when the corpses of the Koreans gradually drifted from the upper course of the river over several days after the start of the construction. This caused an uproar in the parts of the Niigata Prefecture along the river. Tokyo’s Yomiuri Shimbun picked up the story on 29 July 1922. Afterwards, Japanese-Koreans formed the Board of Inquiry into the Conditions of Resident Korean Laborers, and investigated work conditions for Zainichi Koreans.

The people who were behind the Board of Inquiry were central in the formation of the Tokyo League of Korean Labor in November 1922, and in December the Osaka League of Korean Labor was established.

== Aftermath ==
The public uproar which this incident created was partially responsible for the development of trade unions for Korean workers in Japan.

== See also ==
- Ketto Dam
- Pak Yol
- Fumiko Kaneko

== Bibliography ==
- Manabu Miyazaki『不逞者』Gentosha, 1999, ISBN 4-87728-734-5
