= Takanosu Dam =

Takanosu Dam may refer to:

- Takanosu Dam (Kagoshima)
- Takanosu Dam (Niigata)
