= Sasagamine Dam =

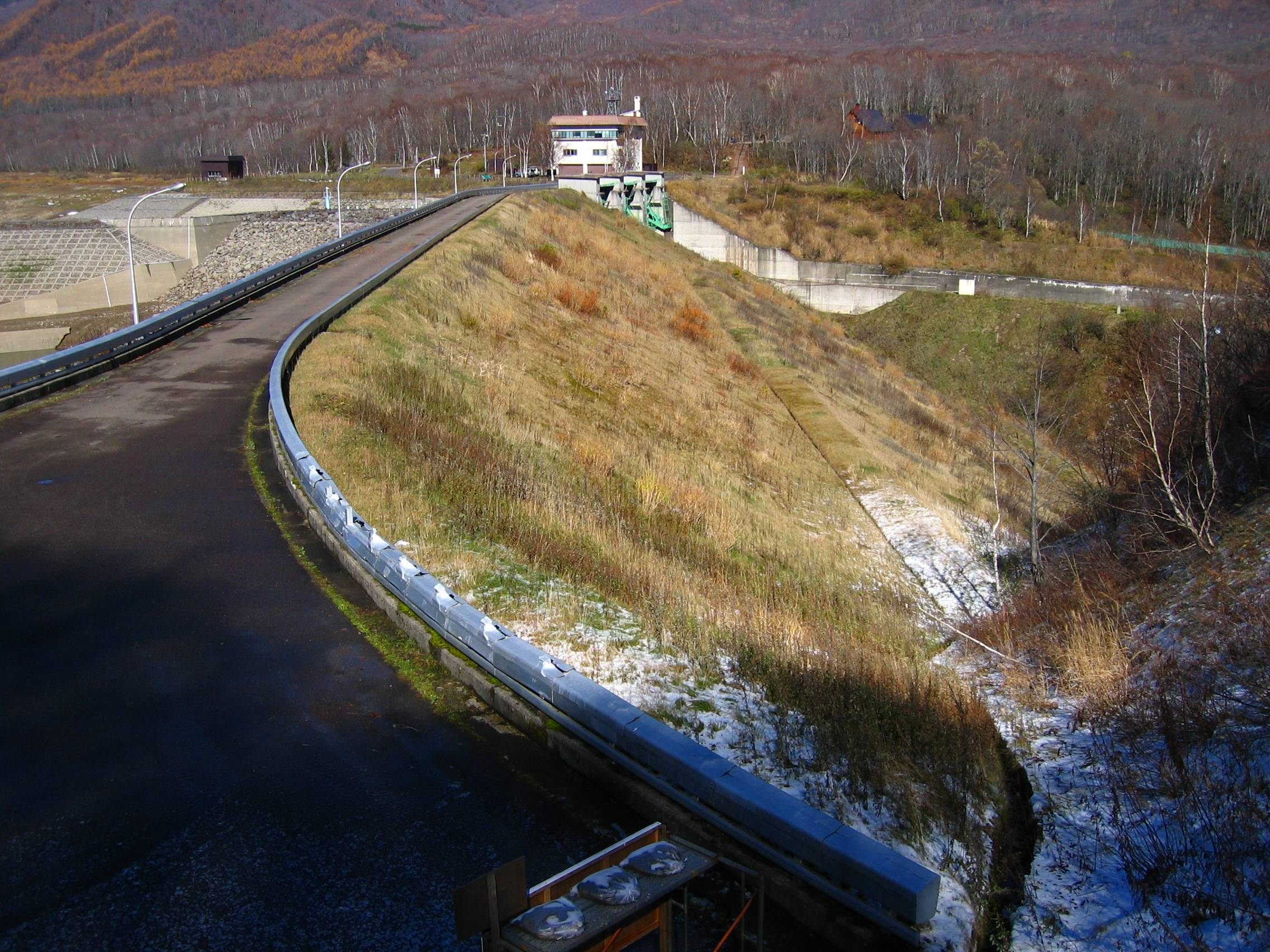
- Interactive map of Sasagamine Dam
- Location: Niigata Prefecture, Japan
- Coordinates: 36°51′25″N 138°04′31″E

Sasagamine Dam (Japanese: 笹ヶ峰ダム) is a dam in the Niigata Prefecture, Japan, completed in 1979.
