= Saruta Dam =

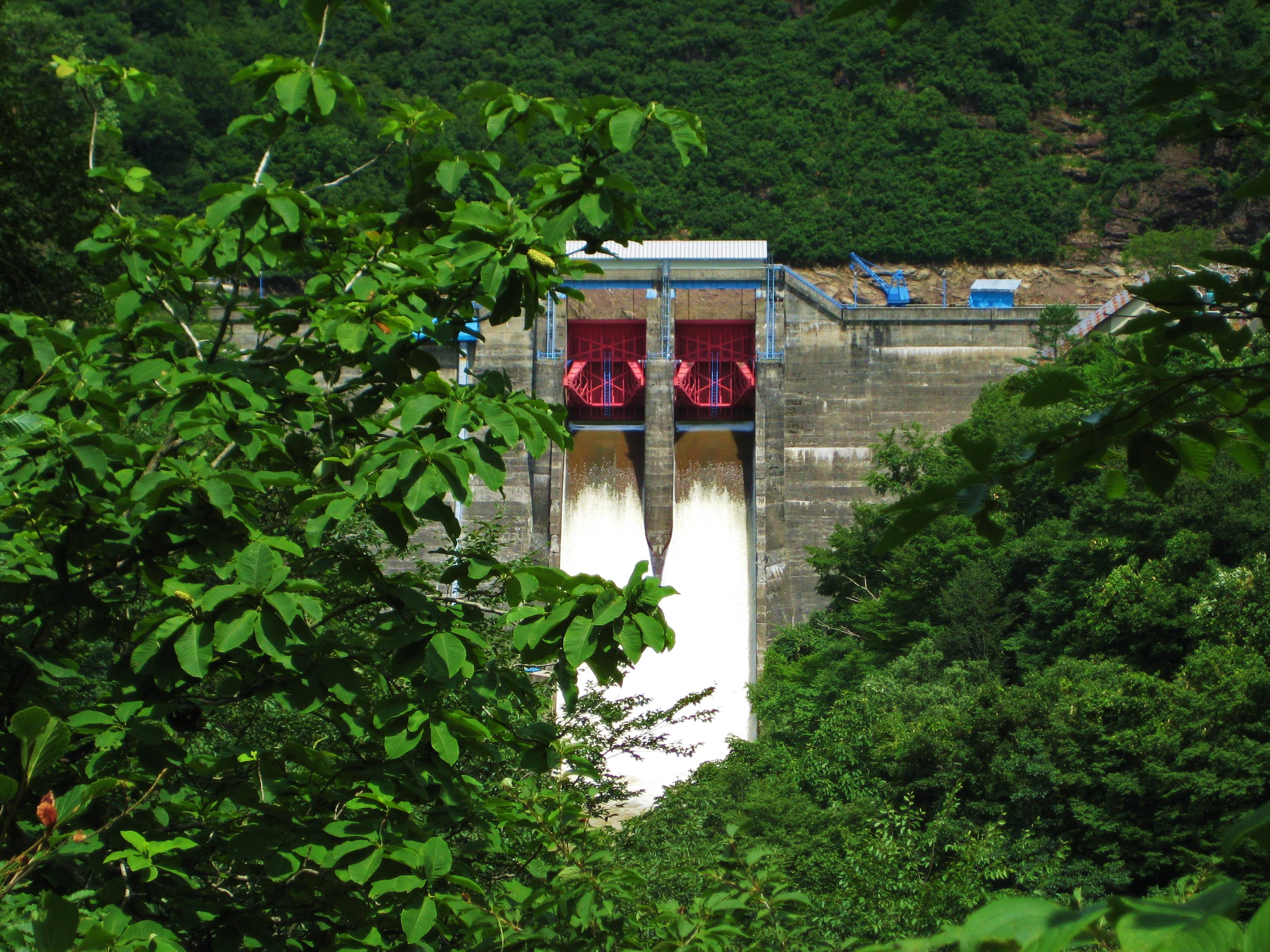
- Interactive map of Saruta Dam
- Location: Niigata Prefecture, Japan
- Coordinates: 38.2761°N 139.7136°E

Saruta Dam (Japanese: 猿田ダム) is a dam in the Niigata Prefecture, Japan, completed in 1955.
