= Toyomi Dam =

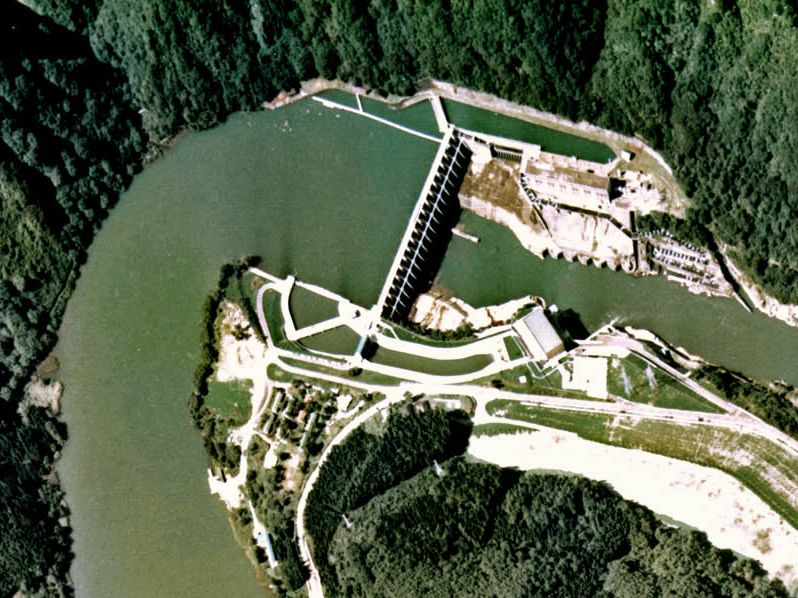
- Interactive map of Toyomi Dam
- Location: Agano, Niigata, Japan
- Coordinates: 37°41′48″N 139°33′59″E

Dam and spillways
- Impounds: Agano River
- Height: 34.2 m (112 ft)
- Dam volume: 18,667,000 m3

Toyomi Dam (豊実ダム) is a dam in Agano, Niigata, Japan, completed in 1929.
