= Takanosu Dam (Niigata) =

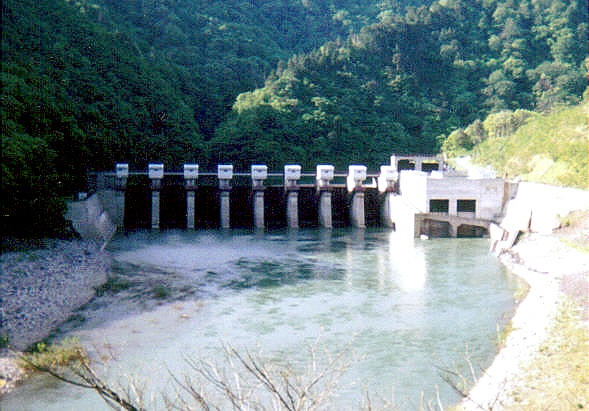
- Interactive map of Takanosu Dam
- Location: Niigata Prefecture, Japan
- Coordinates: 38°04′23″N 139°36′27″E

Takanosu Dam (新鷹の巣ダム) is a dam in Niigata Prefecture, Japan, completed in 2000.
