= Okumiomote Dam =

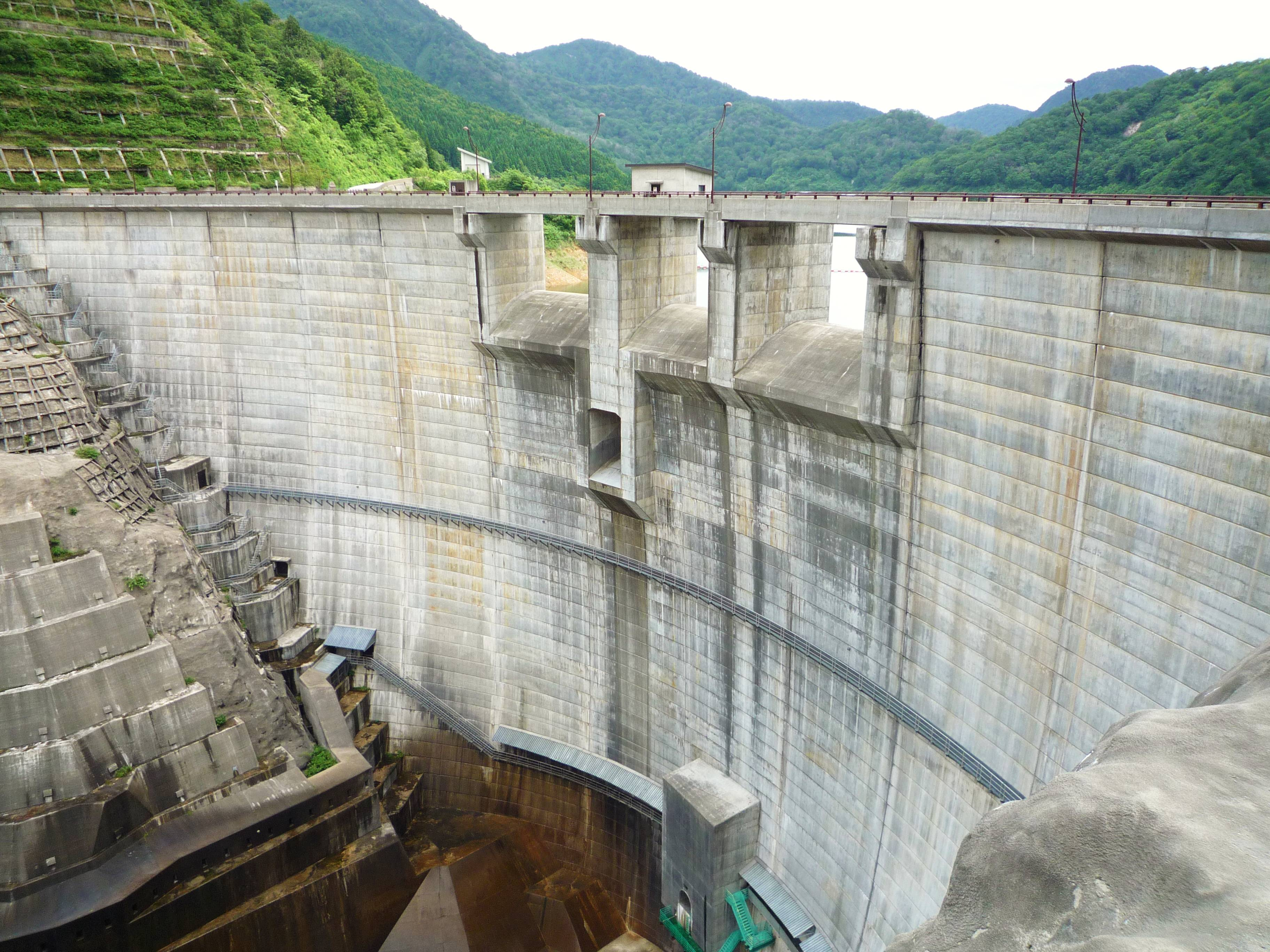
- Interactive map of Okumiomote Dam
- Location: Murakami, Niigata, Japan
- Coordinates: 38°15′46″N 139°42′16″E

Okumiomote Dam (Japanese: 奥三面ダム) is a dam in the Murakami, Niigata, Japan, officially completed on 28 August 2001.

== See also ==
- List_of_dams_and_reservoirs_in_Japan
