= Kanose Dam =

Coordinates: 37°42′19″N 139°28′11″E

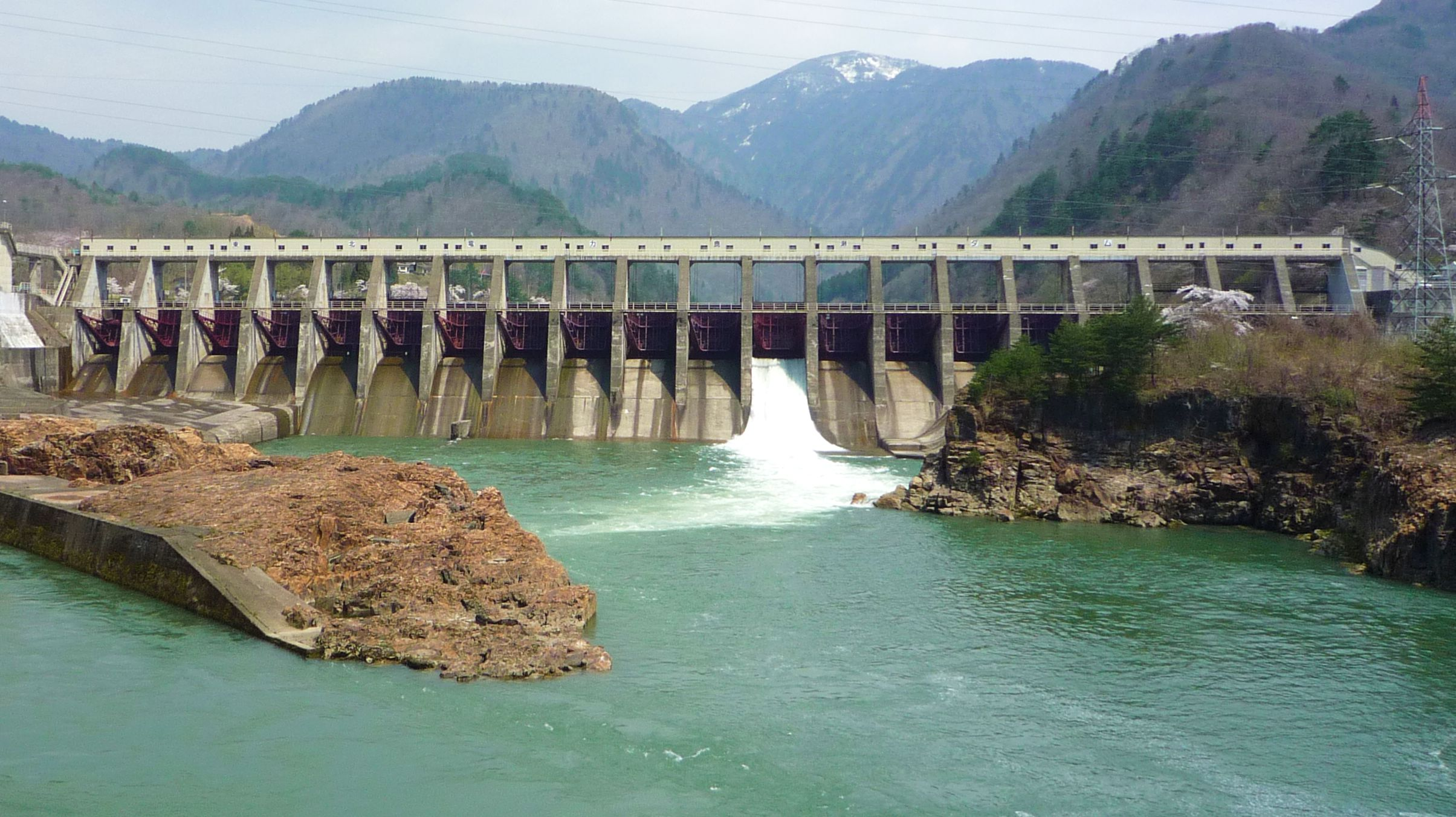
- Interactive map of Kanose Dam
- Location: Niigata Prefecture, Japan

Kanose Dam (Japanese: 鹿瀬ダム) is a dam in the Niigata Prefecture, Japan, completed in 1928.
