= Shozenji Dam =

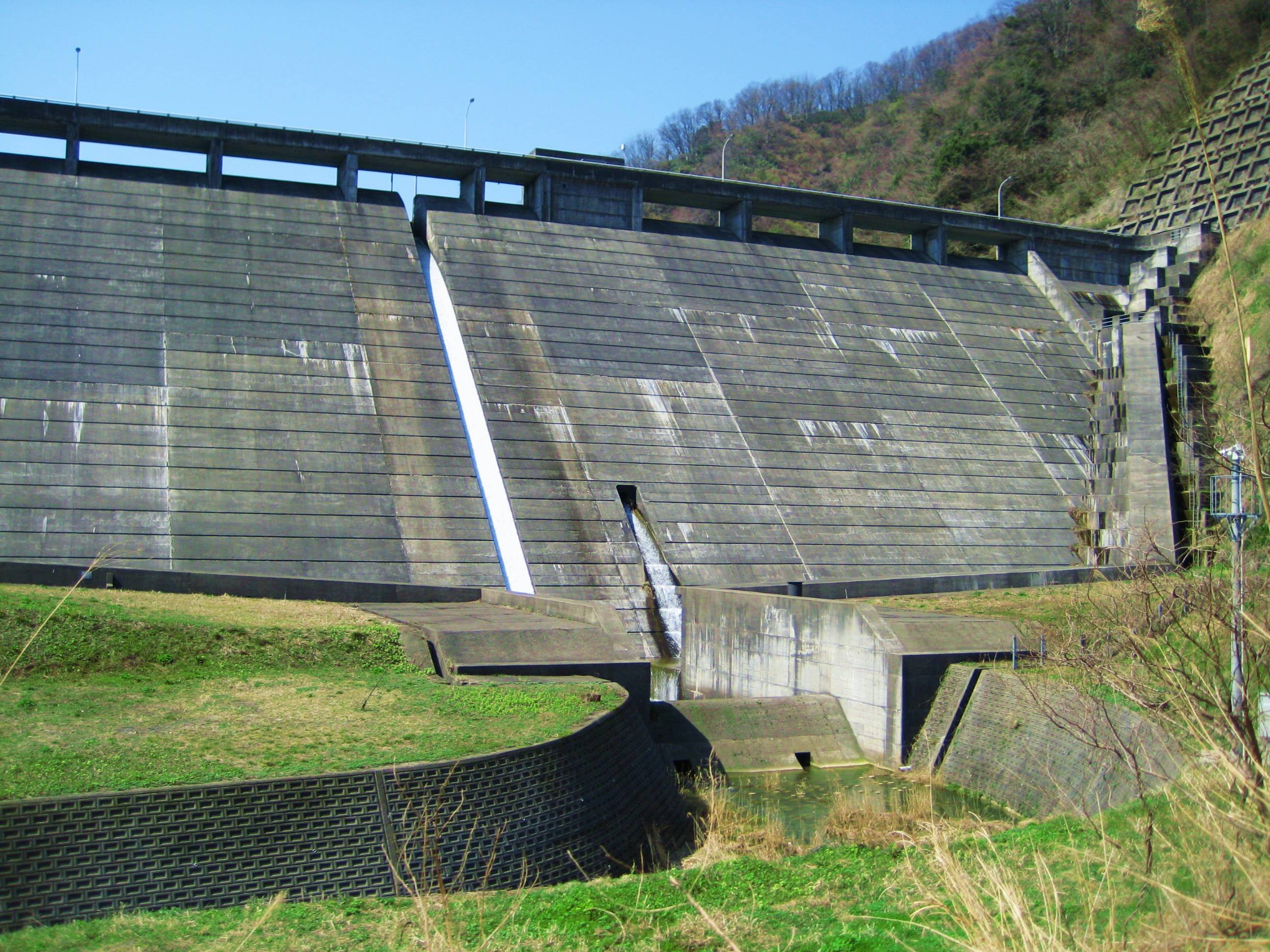
- Interactive map of Shozenji Dam
- Location: Niigata Prefecture, Japan
- Coordinates: 37°08′42″N 138°10′57″E

Shozenji Dam (Japanese: 正善寺ダム) is a dam in the Niigata Prefecture, Japan, completed in 1984.
