= Kuromatagawa Dam =

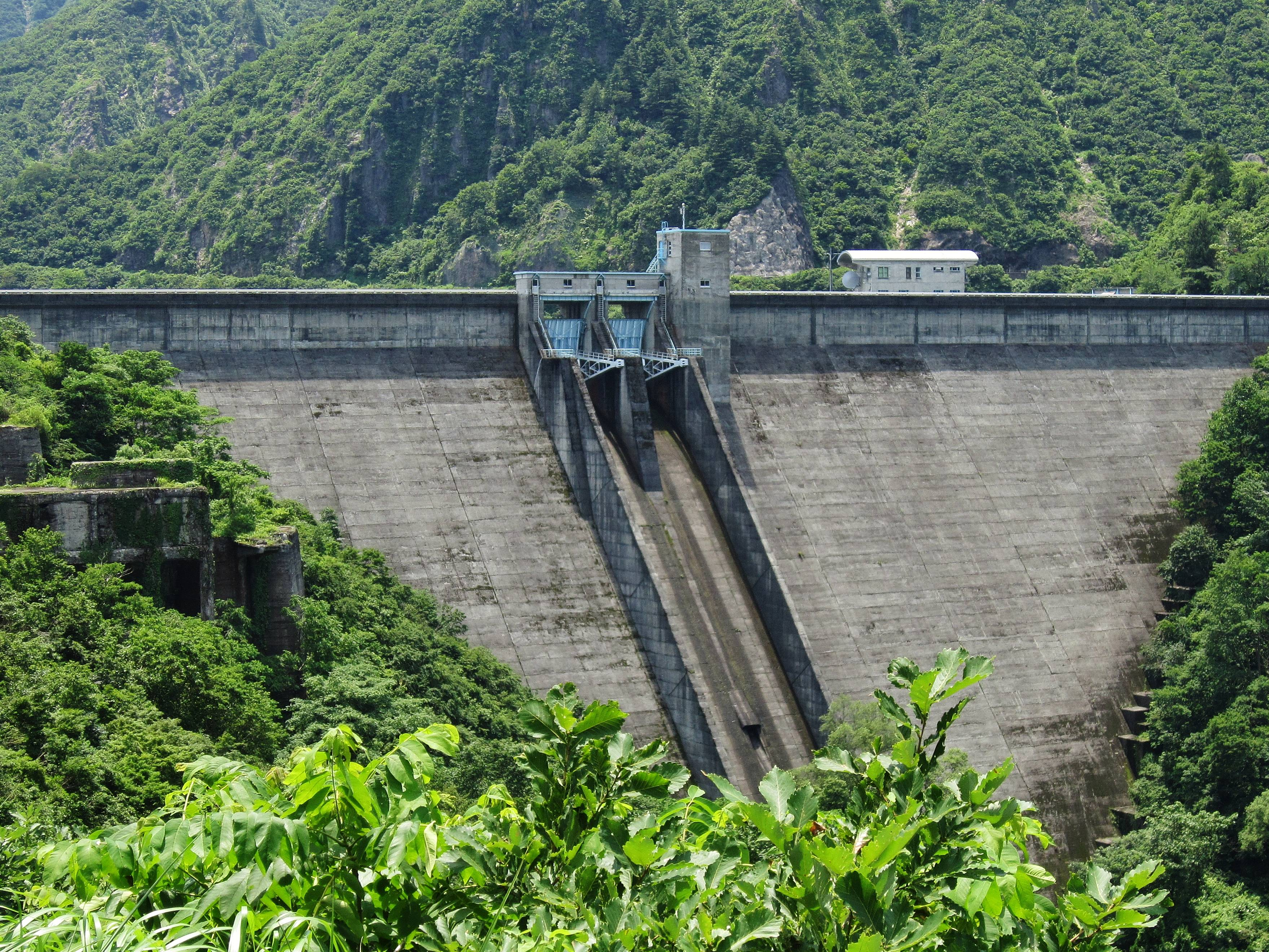

- Location within Japan
- Location: Uonuma, Niigata, Japan
- Coordinates: 37°19′17″N 139°5′50″E

Kuromatagawa Dam (黒又川第一ダム, Kuromatagawa daiichi damu) is a dam in Uonuma, Niigata Prefecture, Japan, completed in 1958.
