= Iwafune Dam =

Coordinates: 38°04′38″N 139°38′24″E

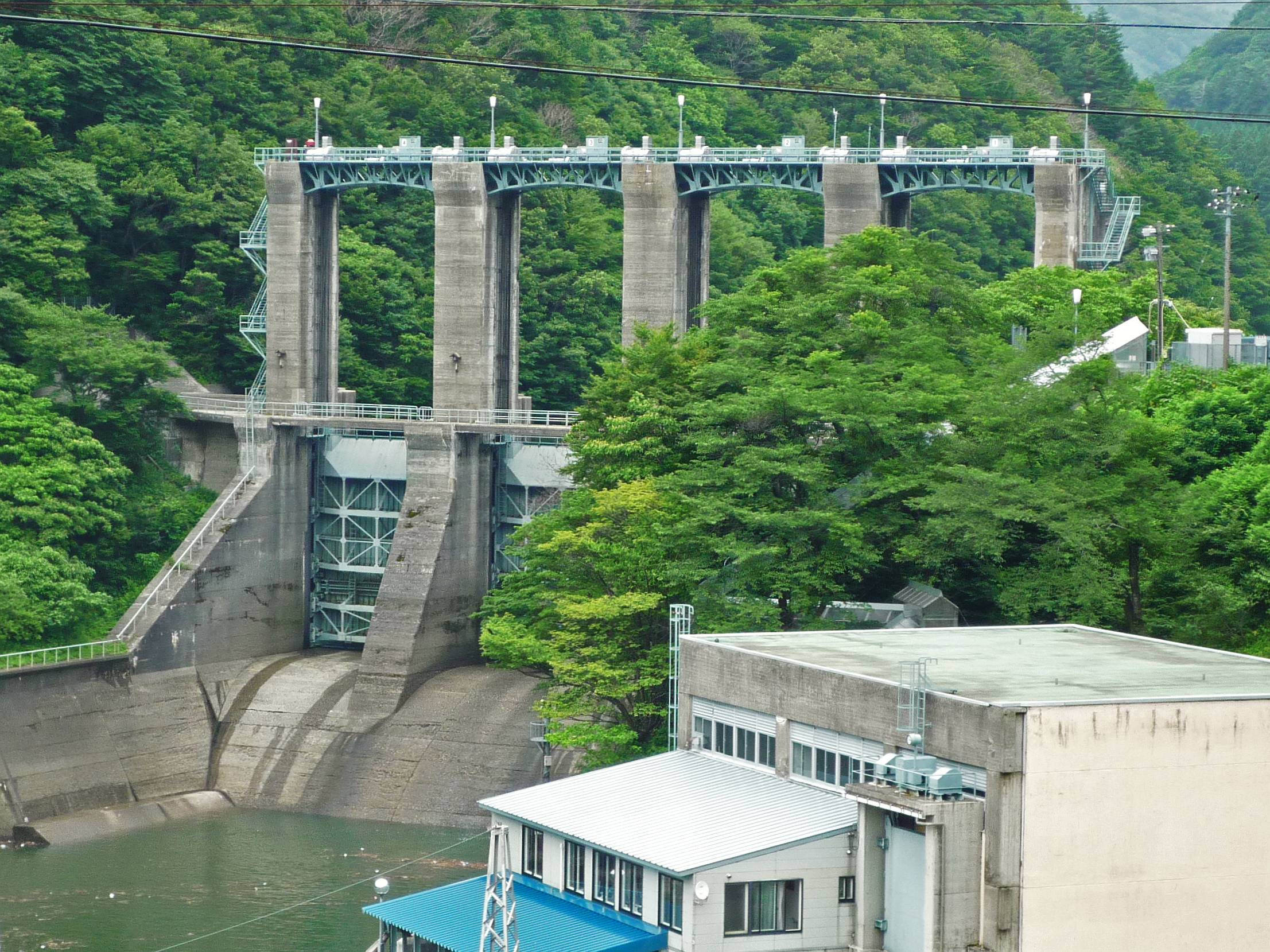
- Interactive map of Iwafune Dam
- Location: Sekikawa, Niigata, Japan
- Construction began: 1960
- Opening date: 1961

Dam and spillways
- Height: 30.2 m (99 ft)
- Length: 92.6 m (304 ft)
- Dam volume: 27,000 m^{3}

Reservoir
- Total capacity: 5,875,000 m^{3}
- Catchment area: 766 km^{2}
- Surface area: 67 ha

Iwafune Dam (岩船ダム, Iwafune damu) is a hydroelectric dam in Sekikawa, Niigata Prefecture, Japan. It was completed in 1961 in the upper reaches of the Arakawa River.
