= Aburumagawa Dam =

Coordinates: 37°20′36″N 139°09′49″E

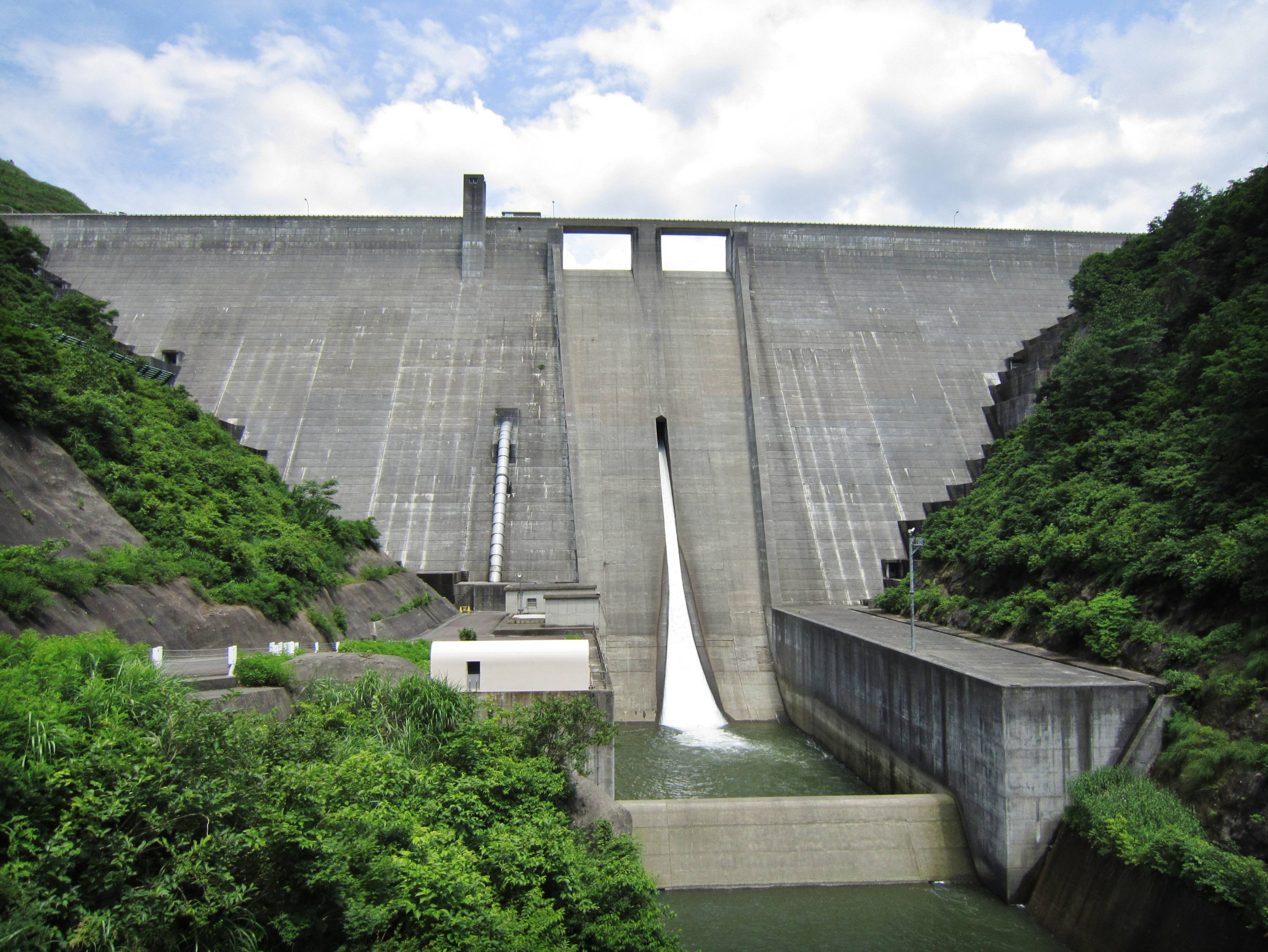
- Interactive map of Aburumagawa Dam
- Location: Uonuma, Niigata, Japan
- Construction began: 1973
- Opening date: 1986

Dam and spillways
- Type of dam: Concrete gravity
- Height: 93.5 m (307 ft)
- Length: 280 m (920 ft)
- Dam volume: 410,000 m^{3} (14,000,000 ft^{3})
- Spillway type: Service, uncontrolled overflow
- Spillway capacity: 1,300 m^{3}/s (46,000 cu ft/s)

Reservoir
- Creates: Aburumagawa Reservoir
- Total capacity: 15,800,000 m^{3} (560,000,000 ft^{3})
- Catchment area: 59.2 km^{2} (22.9 mi^{2})
- Surface area: 81 ha (0.81 km^{2})

Aburumagawa Dam (破間川ダム) is a dam in Uonuma, Niigata Prefecture, Japan. The dam was built between 1973 and 1986. It is a 93.5 m concrete gravity dam, for the purpose of hydroelectric power and flood irrigation control in Niigata Prefecture. The water freezes over during the winter months, affecting supply.
