= Kassagawa Dam =

Coordinates: 36°52′59″N 138°45′34″E

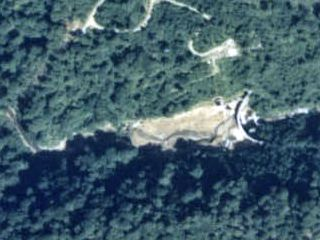
- Interactive map of Kassagawa Dam
- Location: Yuzawa, Niigata, Japan

Kassagawa Dam (カッサ川ダム, Kassagawa damu) is a dam in Yuzawa, Niigata Prefecture, Japan, completed in 1958.
