= Sagurigawa Dam =

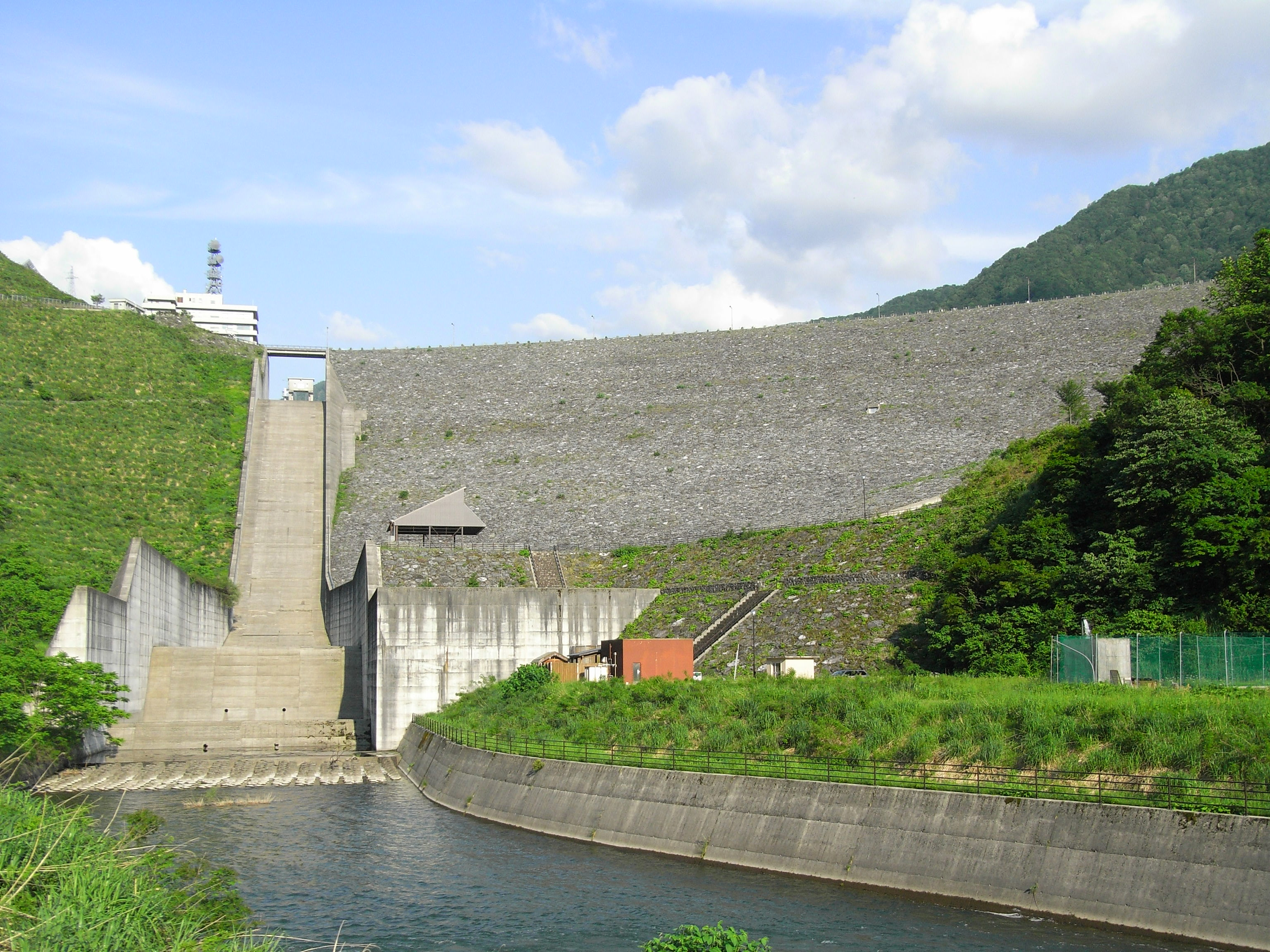
- Interactive map of Sagurigawa Dam
- Location: Niigata Prefecture, Japan
- Coordinates: 37°03′14″N 139°00′03″E

Sagurigawa Dam (Japanese: 三国川ダム) is a rockfill dam in the Niigata Prefecture, Japan, completed in 1993. It was built in the tributary of the Shinanogawa river, a group of mountains. Its purpose is using the water from the river and to protect from floods.
