= Kakizakigawa Dam =

Coordinates: 37°14′33″N 138°28′36″E

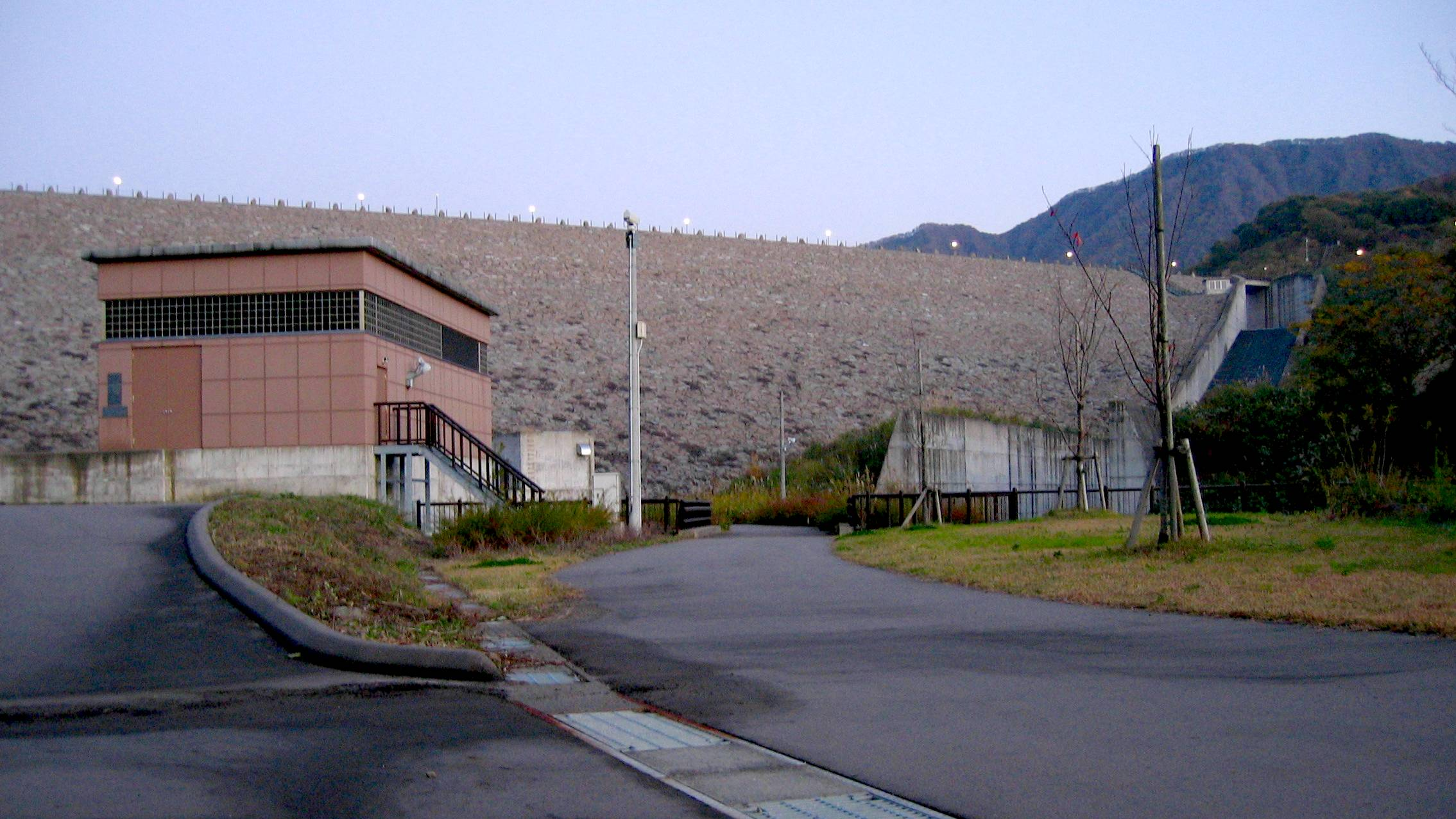
- Interactive map of Kakizakigawa Dam
- Location: Jōetsu, Niigata, Japan
- Construction began: 1976
- Opening date: 2003

Dam and spillways
- Height: 54 m (177 ft)
- Length: 424 m (1,391 ft)
- Dam volume: 1,600,000 m^{3}

Reservoir
- Total capacity: 5,000,000 m^{3}
- Catchment area: 12.5 km^{2}
- Surface area: 39 hectares (96 acres)

Kakizakigawa Dam (柿崎川ダム, Kakizakigawa damu) is a dam in Jōetsu, Niigata Prefecture, Japan, completed in 2003.
