= Miomote Dam =

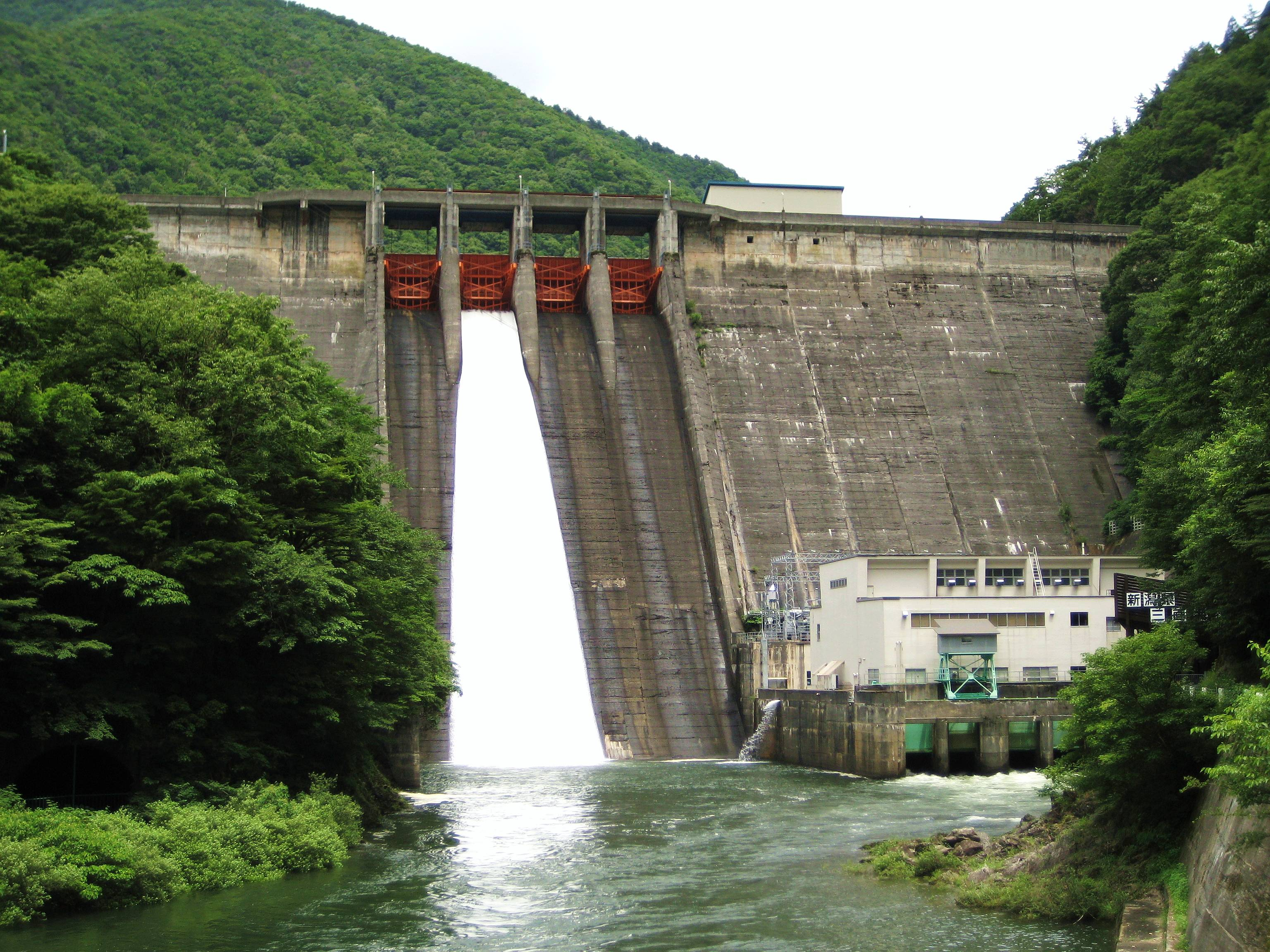
- Interactive map of Miomote Dam
- Location: Murakami, Niigata, Japan
- Coordinates: 38°14′36″N 139°38′37″E

Dam and spillways
- Impounds: Miomote River

Miomote Dam (Japanese: 三面ダム) is a dam in Murakami, Niigata, Japan, completed in 1953.
