= Kasabori Dam =

Coordinates: 37°30′19″N 139°10′26″E

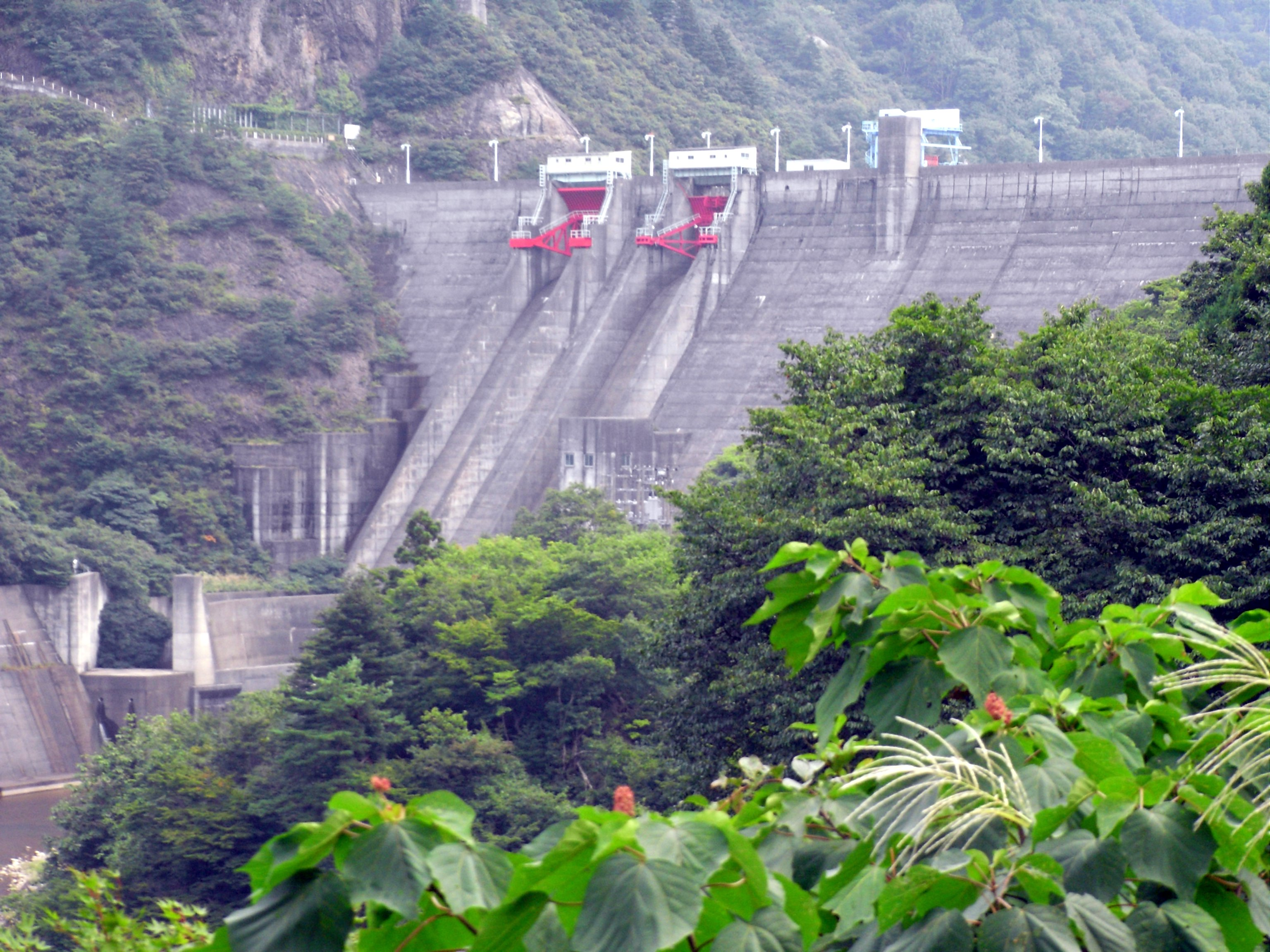
- Interactive map of Kasabori Dam
- Official name: 笠堀ダム
- Location: Niigata Prefecture, Japan
- Purpose: Flood control, Power generation
- Construction began: 1959
- Opening date: 1964
- Operator: Niigata Prefecture

Dam and spillways
- Type of dam: Gravity dam
- Impounds: Shinano River
- Elevation at crest: 74.5 m (244.4 ft)

Reservoir
- Creates: Kasabori Lake ( 笠堀湖 )
- Catchment area: 70 km² (27.03 mi²)

Kasabori Power Plant
- Operator: Niigata Prefecture Public Enterprise Bureau
- Installed capacity: 7.2 MW

Kasabori Dam (Japanese: 笠堀ダム) is a dam in the Niigata Prefecture, Japan, completed in 1964.
