= Futai Dam =

Coordinates: 36°50′37″N 138°45′58″E

- Interactive map of Futai Dam
- Location: Yuzawa, Niigata, Japan
- Construction began: 1972
- Opening date: 1978

Dam and spillways
- Type of dam: Rockfill
- Impounds: Kiyotsu River
- Height: 87 m (285 ft)
- Length: 280 m (920 ft)
- Dam volume: 2,350,000 m³

Reservoir
- Total capacity: 18,300,000 m³
- Catchment area: 107.8 km²
- Surface area: 77 ha

Futai Dam (二居ダム) is a dam in Yuzawa, Niigata Prefecture, Japan, completed in 1978.

Futai Dam (二居ダム) is a dam constructed on the Kiyotsu River, Shinano River System, found in Yuzawa, Niigata Prefecture, Japan. The 87-meter high rock-fill dam forms the lower reservoir of J-POWER's (Electric Power Development Co., Ltd.) large-scale pumped-storage hydroelectric power stations Oku-Seizu and Oku-Seizu No. 2. Water is continually transferred between the upper reservoir and Kassa dam (Lake Tashiro) and the lower reservoir, providing up to 1600 megawatts of electricity.

== History ==
As Japan's longest river, after passing Nagano Prefecture, Shinano River converges with many tributaries as it flows through Niigata Prefecture. After the Second World War, the newly formed J-POWER began work on developing hydroelectric power projects on the Kiyotsu river system. The mountainous region houses many hydroelectric power stations due to its heavy snowfall and its abundance of rapids owing to its topology. In the 1960s, J-POWER completed work on its first and second dams on the Kuromata River on the Kiyotsu River system. The 1970s saw the company begin work on constructing a large scale pumped-storage power station on the upper reaches of the Kiyotsu River. The Kiyotsu River, which originates at Mt. Naeba on the border of Nagano Prefecture and flows into the Shinano River, and its tributary, the Kassa River, were each dammed. From this, their differences in elevation are used to generate up to 1000 megawatts of electricity. Construction work began in 1972 and was completed in 1978.

Following this, additional work to boost the power output by an additional 600 megawatts began, leading to the establishment of the Oku-Kiyotsu No. 2 Power Station, finishing construction in 1996. From this the power stations reached a total output of 1600 megawatts, becoming one of the largest pumped storage power plant complexes in Japan.

== Local area ==
The road to the Oku-Kiyotsu Power Station branches off from the Yuzawa Interchange on the Kan-etsu Expressway (located on National Route 17) heading towards the Naeba Ski Resort. Once the four large letters "OKKY" appear on the mountain slope visible from the motorway, the driver will pass through a tunnel leading them directly to Futai Dam and the Oku-Kiyotsu Power Stations. Okky is the nickname given to the Oku-Kiyotsu power stations, accompanied by a mascot character in the shape of a water drop that welcomes visitors.

Various power companies have set up facilities for publicity purposes near the power stations, and the grounds often host guided tours. Specifically, the power stations at Oku-Kiyotsu have become a publicity center and museum ("Okky Museum"), wherein one can visit free of charge and without prior registration. For guests, this provides a valuable opportunity to see genuine electrical equipment operate up close without the guidance of a staff member. The facility is open to guests every year from April to November, Monday to Saturday from 9:30am to 5:00pm.

From the top of the dam, it is possible to see the dam's lake stretching upstream. At the same time, it is also possible to see the light blue power equipment lined up directly below the dam. The surrounding area is host to many ski resorts, including the Kagura and Naeba Ski Resorts. From the Tashiro ropeway, which connects Tashiro Station on National Route 17 and the Kagura Ski Resort, it is possible to enjoy a panoramic view of both Futai Dam and the Oku-Kiyotsu power stations. Note that while the facilities for Futai Dam are open to the public, access to Kassa Dam, Futai Dam's counterpart, is restricted.

Kiyotsu river, which is downstream of Futai dam, is home to Kiyotsu Gorge, a nationally designated Place of Scenic Beauty located within the Jōshin'etsu-kōgen National Park. While the Ministry of Land, Infrastructure, Transport and Tourism intended to construct the dam within the gorge, following a review of public works projects the plan was canceled.

== See also ==
- List of dams and reservoirs in Japan
