= Uchinokura Dam =

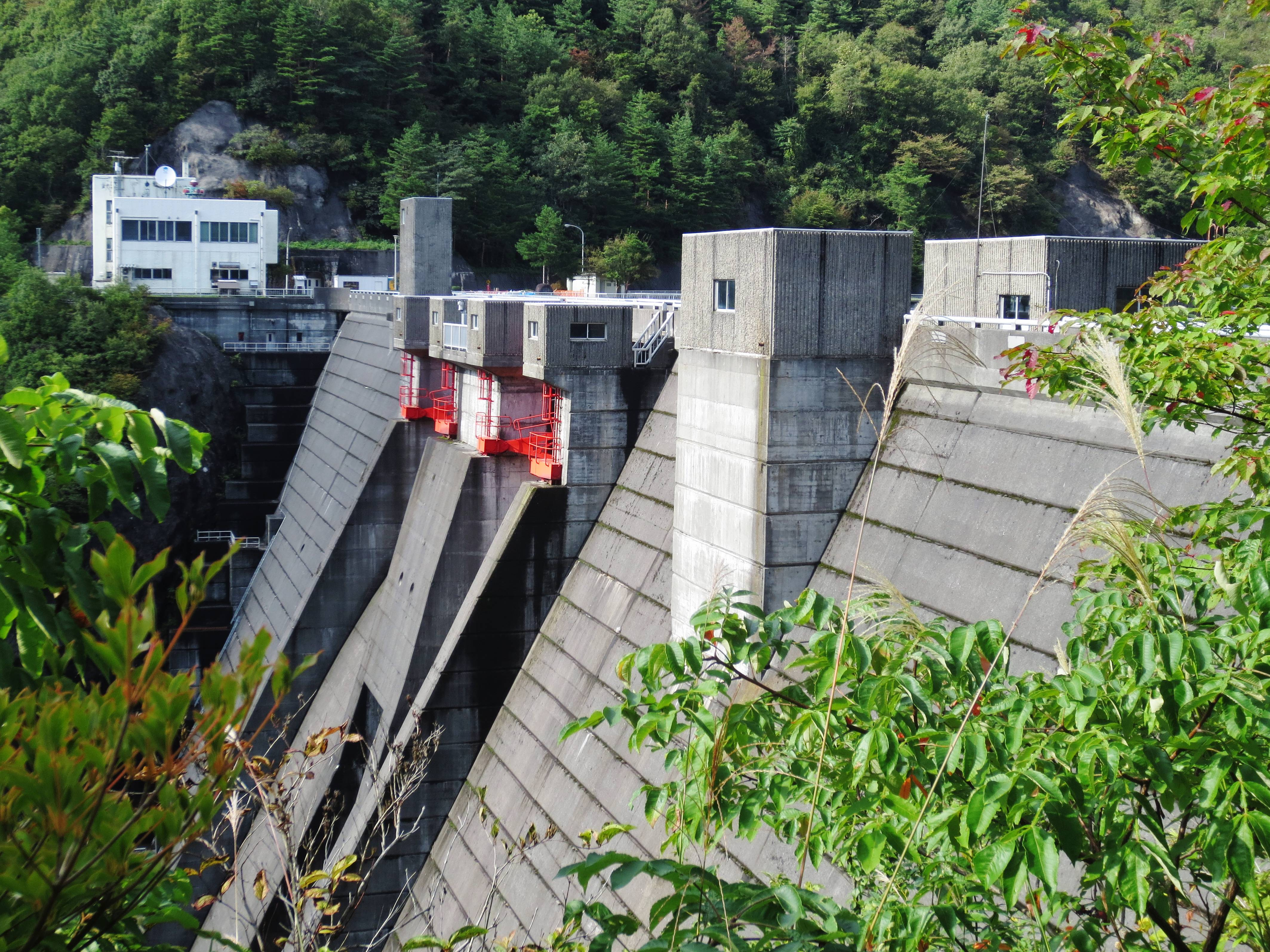
- Interactive map of Uchinokura Dam
- Location: Shibata, Niigata, Japan
- Coordinates: 37°51′01″N 139°25′29″E
- Construction began: 1959
- Opening date: 1973

Dam and spillways
- Height: 82.5 m (271 ft)
- Length: 166 m (545 ft)
- Dam volume: 216,000 m^{3}

Reservoir
- Total capacity: 24,800,000 m^{3}
- Catchment area: 47.5 km^{2}
- Surface area: 100 hectares (250 acres)

Uchinokura Dam (Japanese: 内の倉ダム, Uchinokura damu) is a dam in Shibata, Niigata Prefecture, Japan, completed in 1973. It is located about 5 kilometers downstream from the Kajigawa Dam.
