= Oishi Dam =

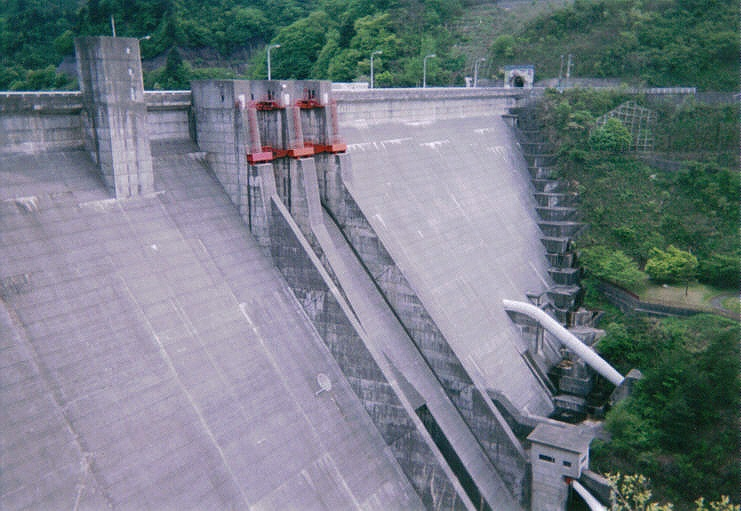
- Interactive map of Oishi Dam
- Location: Niigata Prefecture, Japan
- Coordinates: 38°01′52″N 139°34′01″E

Oishi Dam (Japanese: 大石ダム) is a dam in the Niigata Prefecture, Japan, completed in 1978.
