= Kajigawachisui Dam =

Coordinates: 37°48′53″N 139°29′34″E

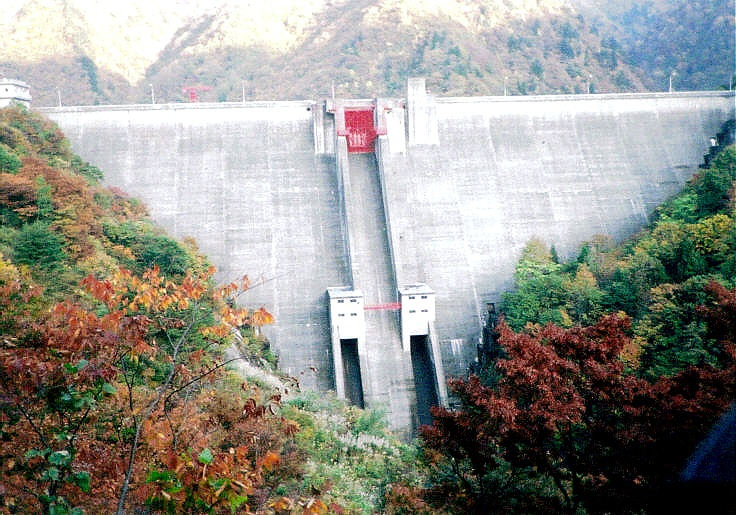
- Interactive map of Kajigawachisui Dam
- Location: Shibata, Niigata, Japan
- Construction began: 1967
- Opening date: 1974

Dam and spillways
- Height: 106.5 m (349 ft)
- Length: 285.5 m (937 ft)
- Dam volume: 428,000 m^{3}

Reservoir
- Total capacity: 22,500,000 m^{3}
- Catchment area: 88 km^{2}
- Surface area: 65 hectares (160 acres)

Kajigawachisui Dam (加治川治水ダム, Kajigawa chisui damu) is a dam in Shibata, Niigata Prefecture, Japan, completed in 1974. It is located about 5 kilometers upstream from the Uchinokura Dam.
