= Kuromata Dam =

Coordinates: 37°20′22″N 139°04′54″E

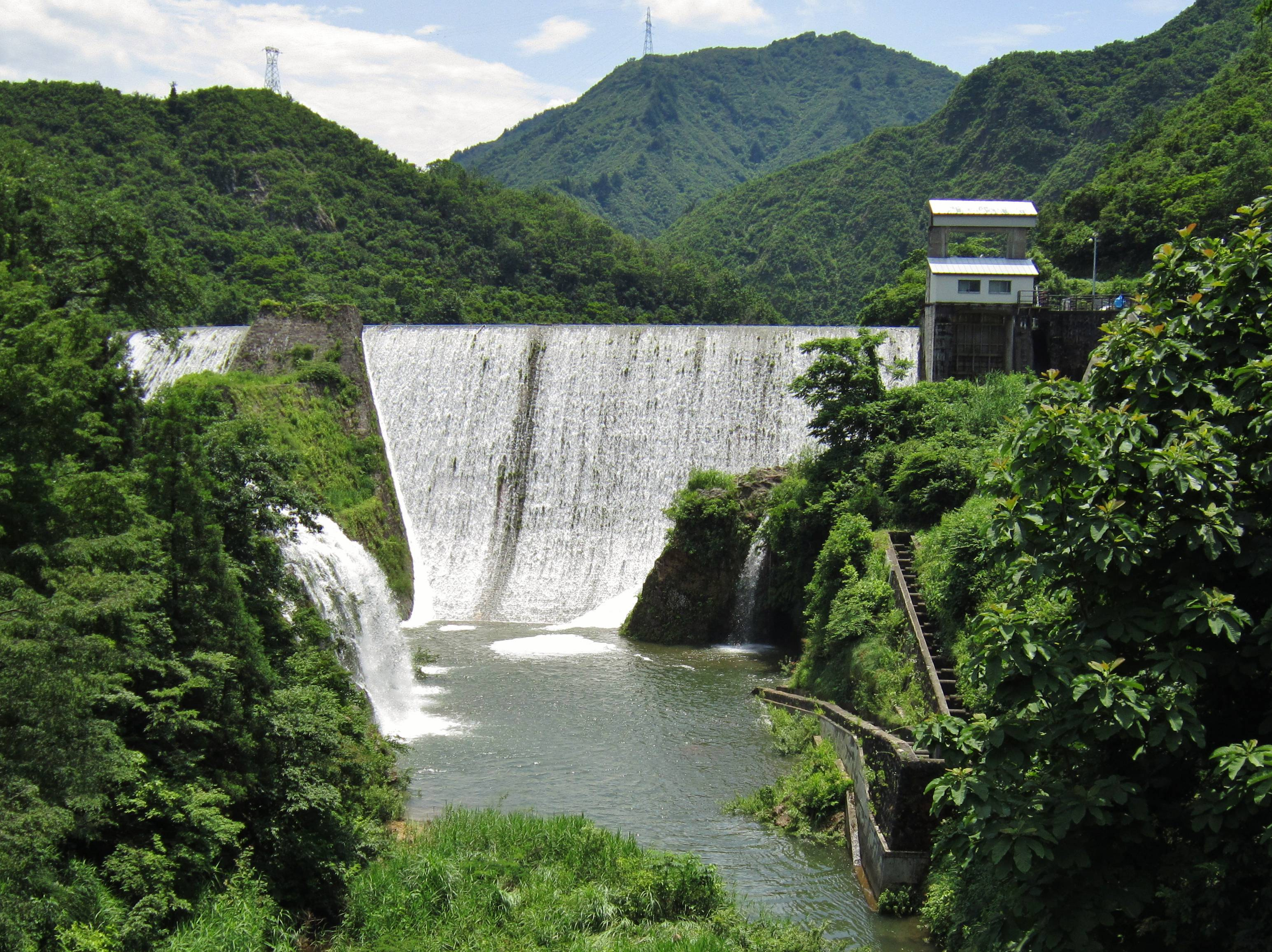
- Interactive map of Kuromata Dam
- Official name: 黒又ダム
- Location: Niigata Prefecture, Japan
- Purpose: Power
- Opening date: 1926; 100 years ago

Dam and spillways
- Type of dam: Gravity dam
- Impounds: Kuromata River
- Length: 217.5 m (714 ft)
- Elevation at crest: 24.5 m (80.4 ft)

Reservoir
- Catchment area: 117.5 km² (45.4 mi²)

Power Station
- Operator: Tohoku Electric Power
- Installed capacity: 6 MW

Kuromata Dam (Japanese: 黒又ダム) is a dam in the Niigata Prefecture, Japan, completed in 1926.
