= Agekawa Dam =

Coordinates: 37°41′36″N 139°23′14.3″E

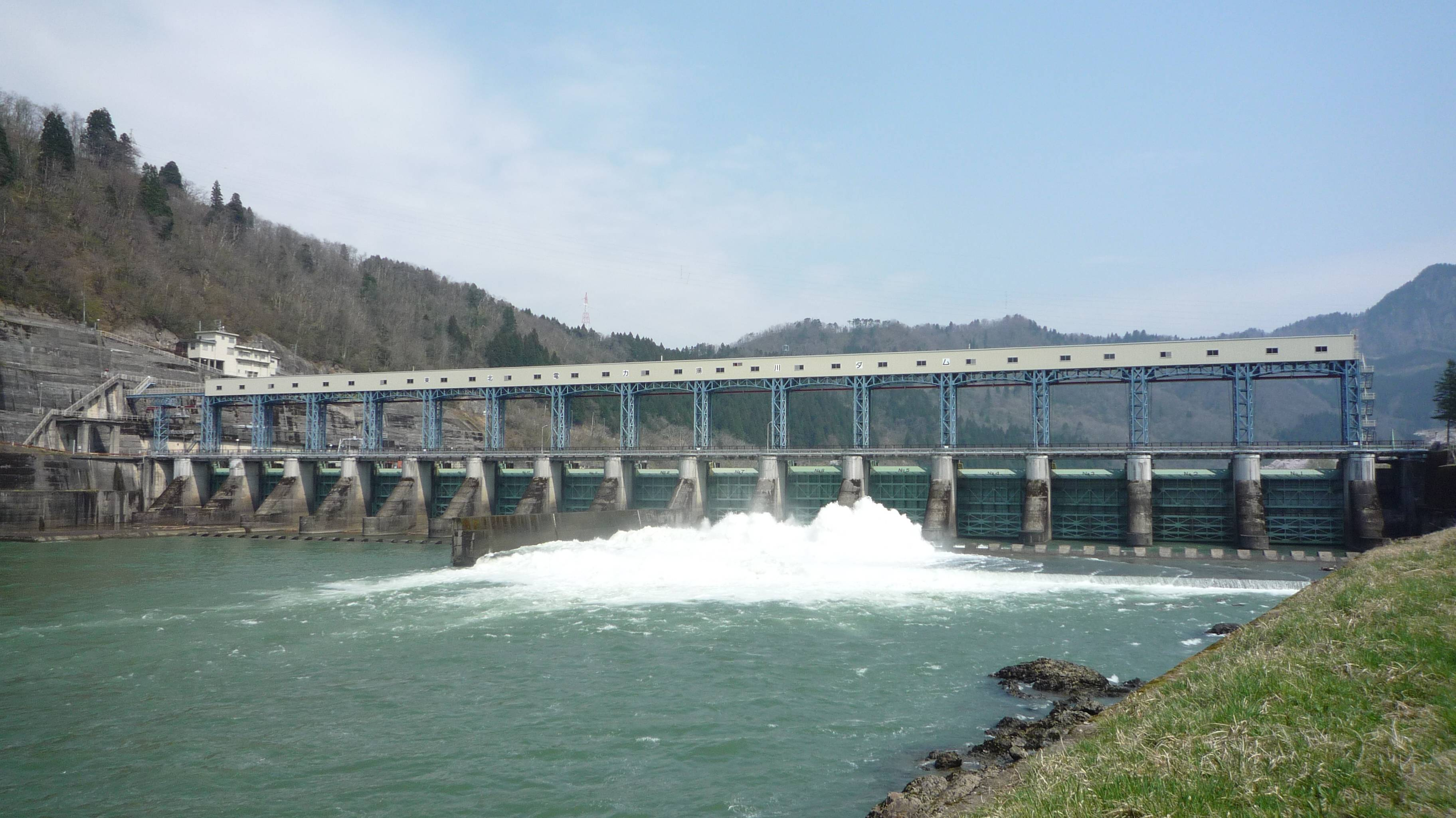
- Interactive map of Agekawa Dam
- Location: Aga, Niigata, Japan

Agekawa Dam (Japanese: 揚川ダム) is a dam in Aga, Niigata Prefecture, Japan, built between 1961 and 1963.
