= Asagawara Dam =

Dam in Tōkamachi, Niigata, Japan

Coordinates: 37°8′11.8″N 138°43′34.7″E

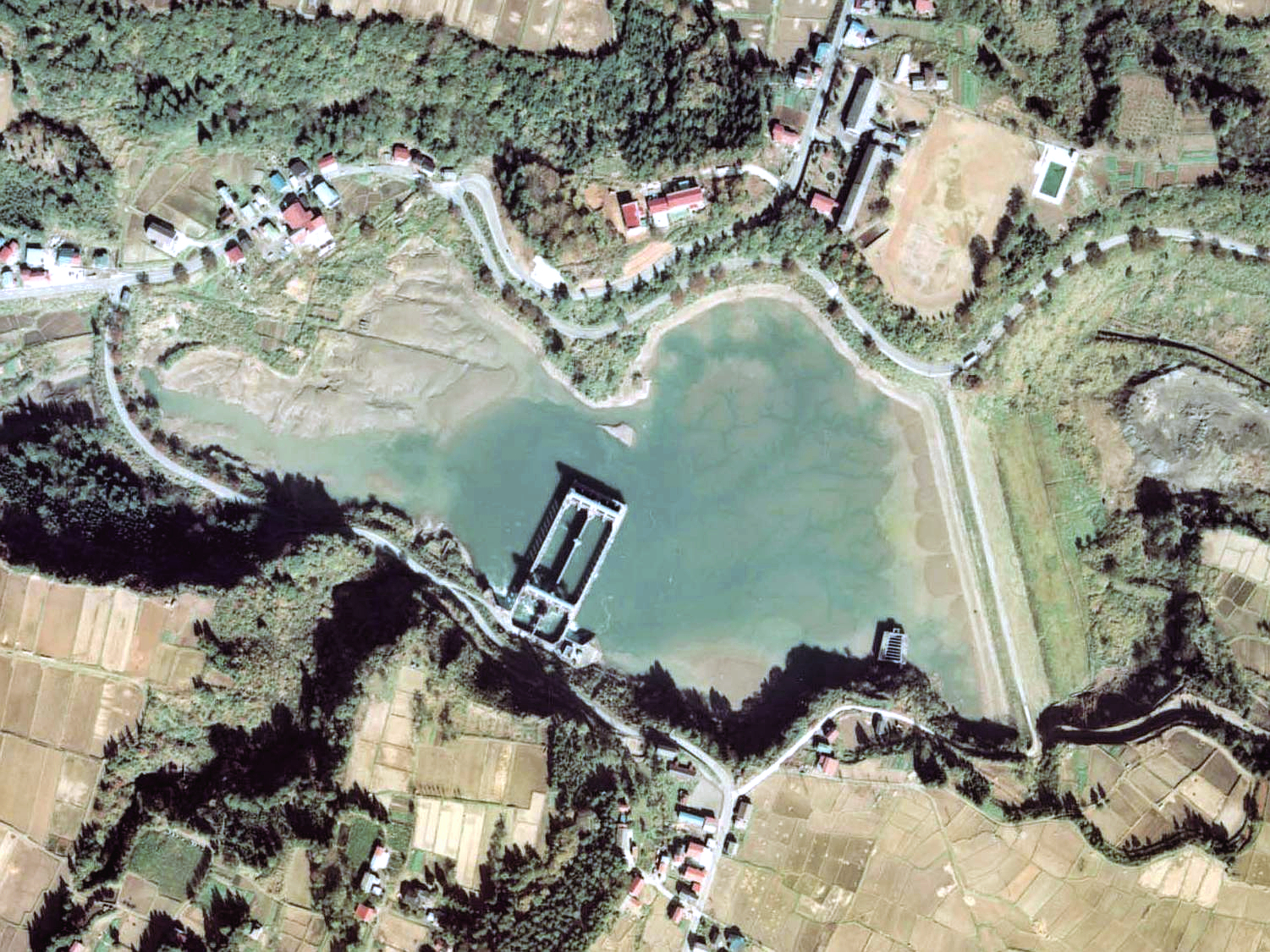
- Interactive map of Asagawara Dam
- Location: Tōkamachi, Niigata, Japan

Asagawara Dam (Japanese: 浅河原調整池) is a dam in Tōkamachi, Niigata Prefecture, Japan, completed in 1945.
