= Tainai Dam =

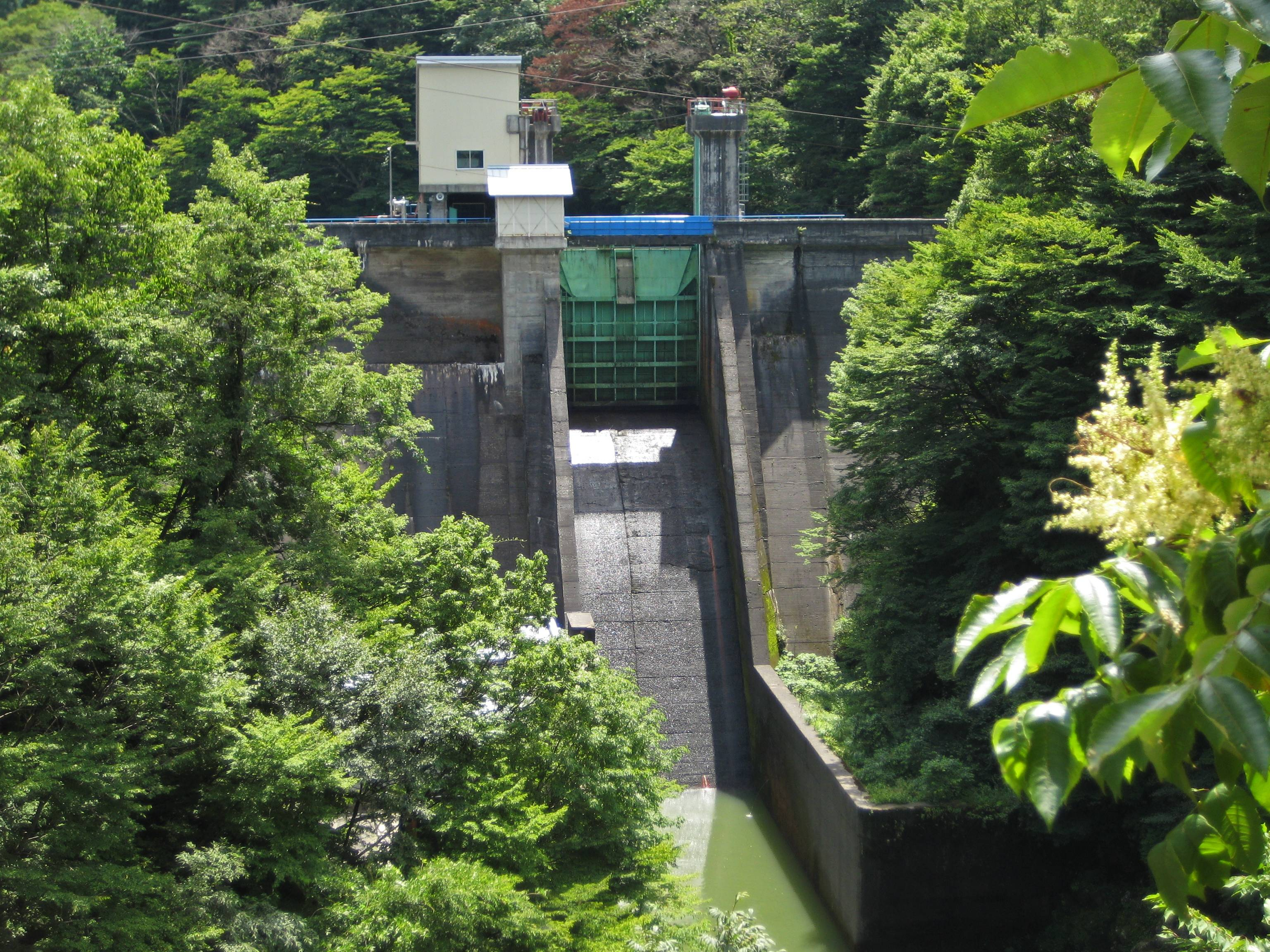
- Interactive map of Tainai Dam
- Location: Niigata Prefecture, Japan

Tainai Dam (Japanese: 胎内第二ダム) are two dams in the Niigata Prefecture, Japan. They are called Tainai I Dam and Tainai II Dam.
