= Otani Dam =

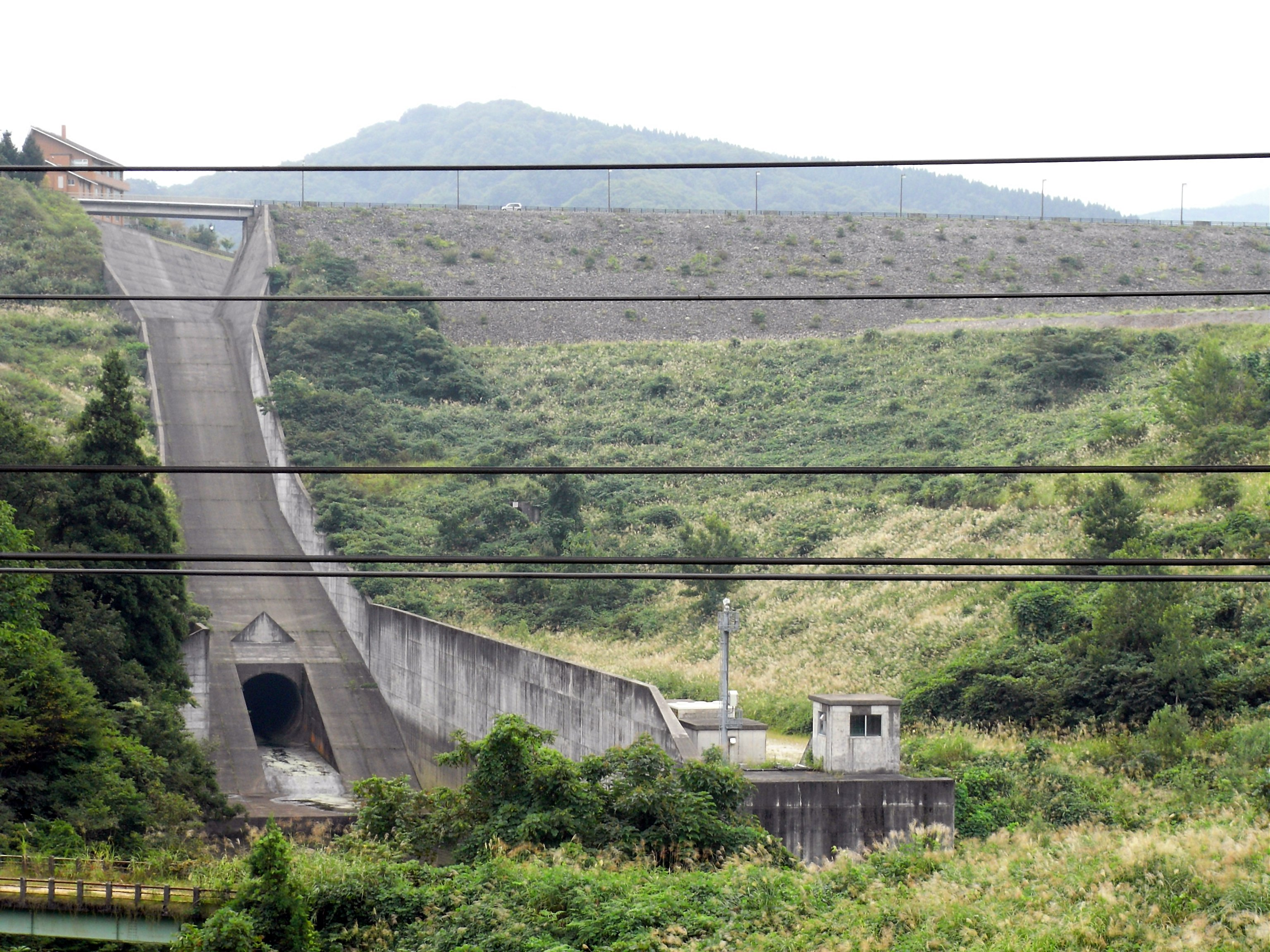
- Interactive map of Otani Dam
- Location: Niigata Prefecture, Japan
- Coordinates: 37°29′39″N 139°09′16″E

Otani Dam (大谷ダム, Ōtani Damu) is a dam in Niigata Prefecture, Japan.
