= Ketto Dam =

Coordinates: 36°56′40″N 138°39′36″E

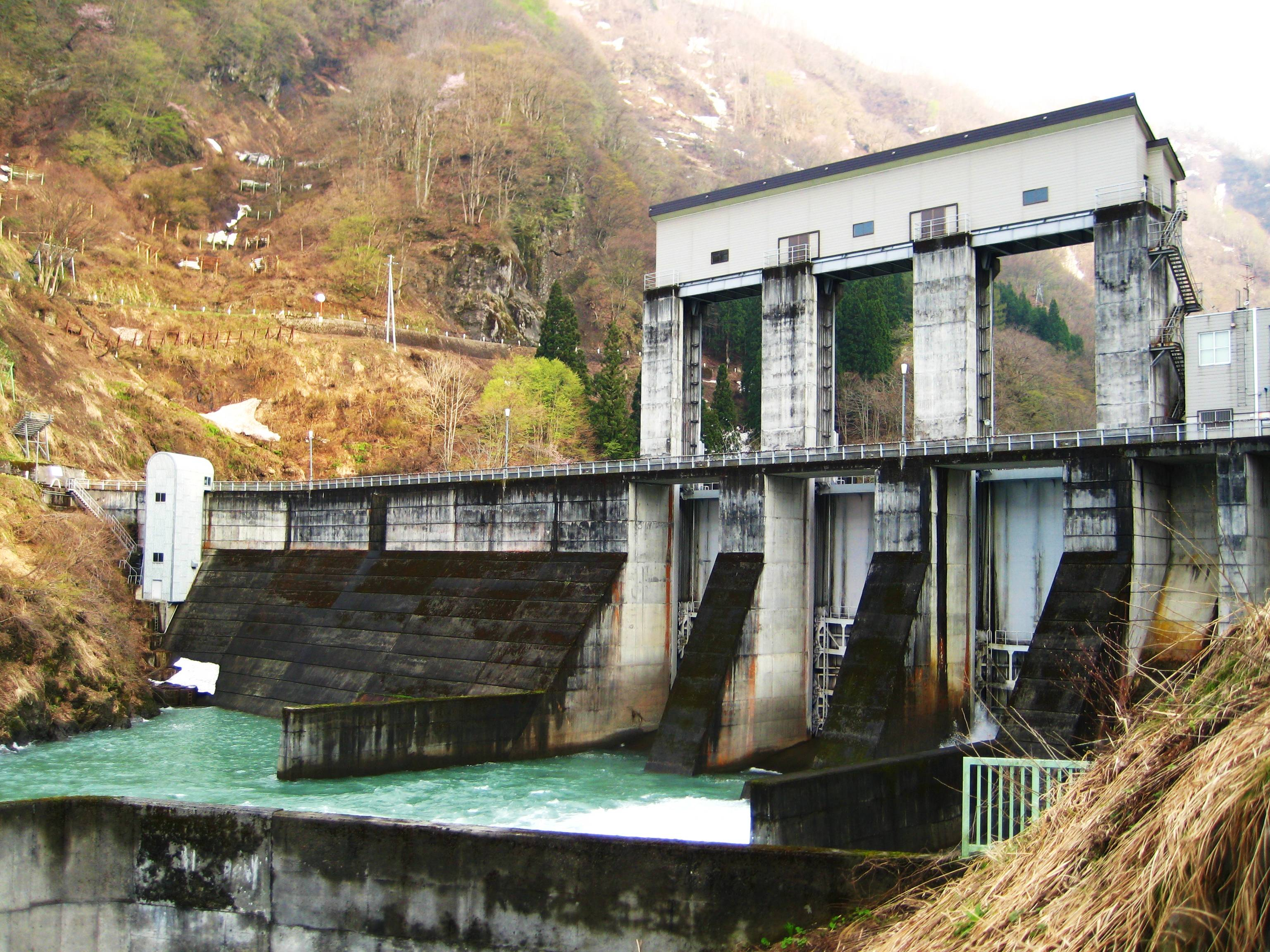
- Interactive map of Ketto Dam
- Official name: 高野山ダム
- Location: Tsunan, Niigata, Japan
- Purpose: Power
- Construction began: 1968
- Opening date: 1972; 54 years ago
- Operator: Tokyo Electric Power Company

Dam and spillways
- Type of dam: Earth fill dam
- Impounds: Shinano River

Reservoir
- Catchment area: 218.6 km² (84.4 mi²)

Power Station
- Installed capacity: 126 MW

Ketto Dam (Japanese: 穴藤ダム) is a dam in Tsunan, Niigata Prefecture, Japan, near the village of Ketto. It was completed in 1972.
