= Kassa Dam =

Coordinates: 36°51′30″N 138°44′24″E

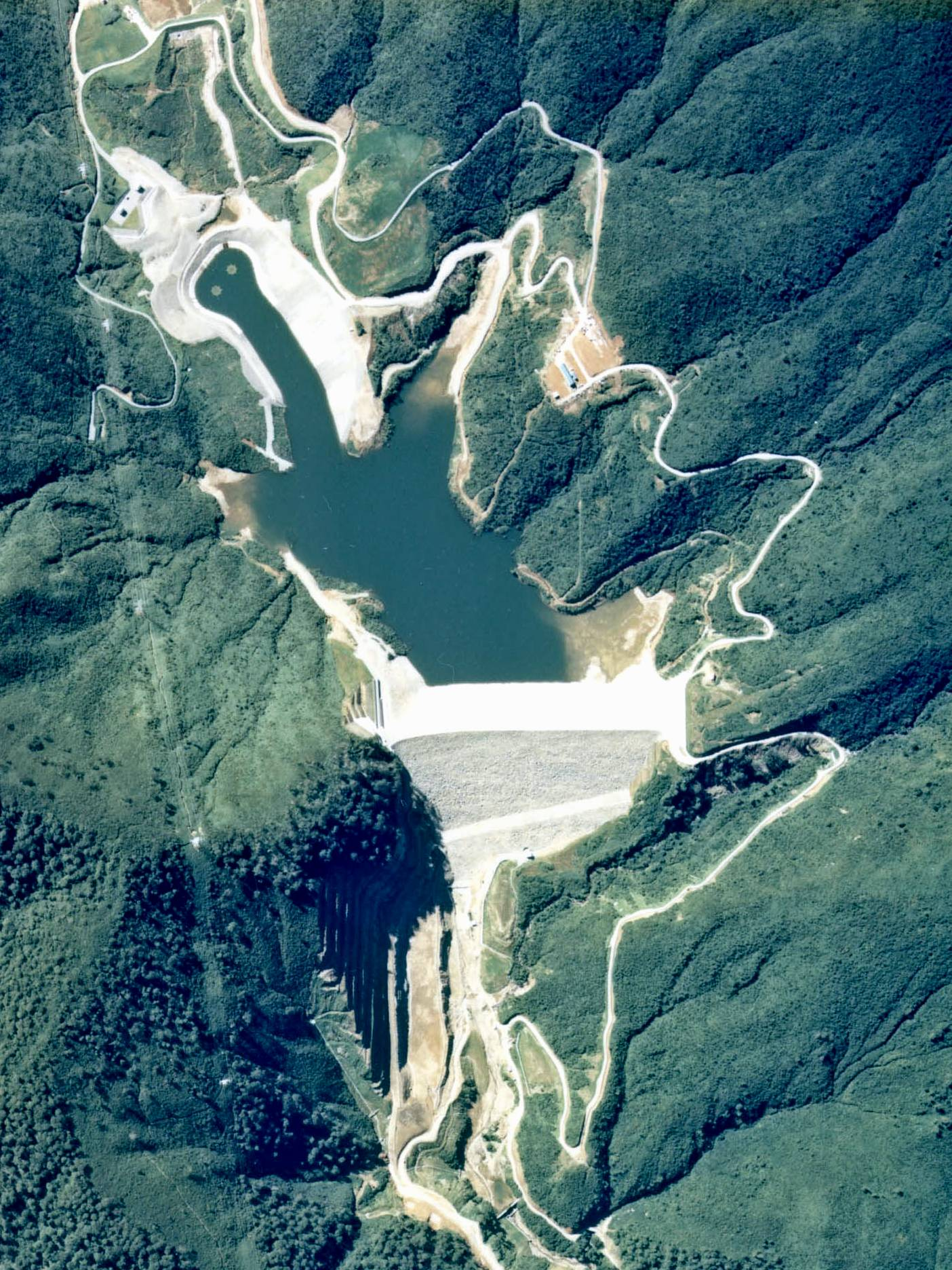
- Interactive map of Kassa Dam
- Official name: カッサダム
- Location: Yuzawa, Niigata, Japan
- Purpose: Power
- Construction began: 1972
- Opening date: 1978

Dam and spillways
- Type of dam: Earth fill dam
- Impounds: Shinano River
- Height (foundation): 90 m (295.3 ft)

Reservoir
- Catchment area: 4.5 km² (1.74 mi²)

Okukiyotsu Power Plant Okukiyotsu No. 2 Power Plant
- Operator: J-Power
- Installed capacity: 1,000MW; 600MW

Kassa Dam (カッサダム, Kassa damu) is a dam in Yuzawa, Niigata Prefecture, Japan, completed in 1978.
