= Suibara Station =

Railway station in Agano, Niigata Prefecture, Japan

Suibara Station 水原駅
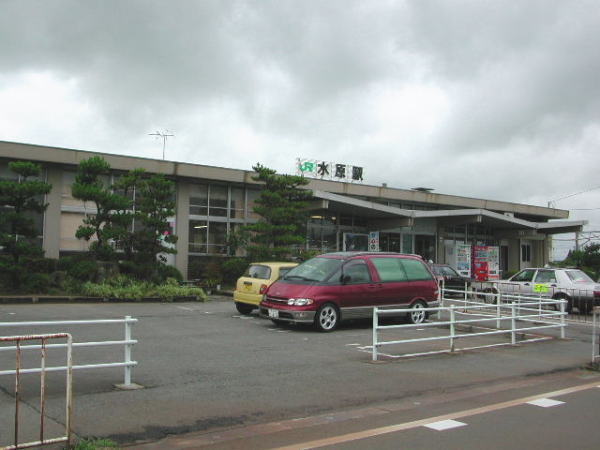
- East side of Suibara Station in July 2004

General information
- Location: 1 Gejocho, Agano-shi, Niigata-ken 959–2026; Japan
- Coordinates: 37°50′12.79″N 139°13′2.17″E
- Operator: JR East
- Line: ■ Uetsu Main Line
- Distance: 10.2 km from Niitsu
- Platforms: 2 side platforms
- Tracks: 2

Other information
- Status: Staffed ("Midori no Madoguchi")
- Website: www.jreast.co.jp/estation/station/info.aspx?StationCd=892

History
- Opened: 2 September 1912

Passengers
- FY2017: 787

Services
Preceding station	JR East	Following station
Kyōgase towards Niitsu	Uetsu Main Line	Kamiyama towards Akita
Location
- Location within Japan

Suibara Station (水原駅, Suibara-eki) is a railway station on the Uetsu Main Line in the city of Agano, Niigata, Japan, operated by East Japan Railway Company (JR East). It is the main train station for the city of Agano.

== Lines ==
Suibara Station is served by the Uetsu Main Line and is 10.2 kilometers from the starting point of the line at Niitsu Station.

== Station layout ==
The station consists of two ground-level opposed side platforms serving two tracks with the platforms connected by a footbridge. However, only one of the platforms is in normal use, and serves bi-directional traffic. The station has a "Midori no Madoguchi" staffed ticket office.

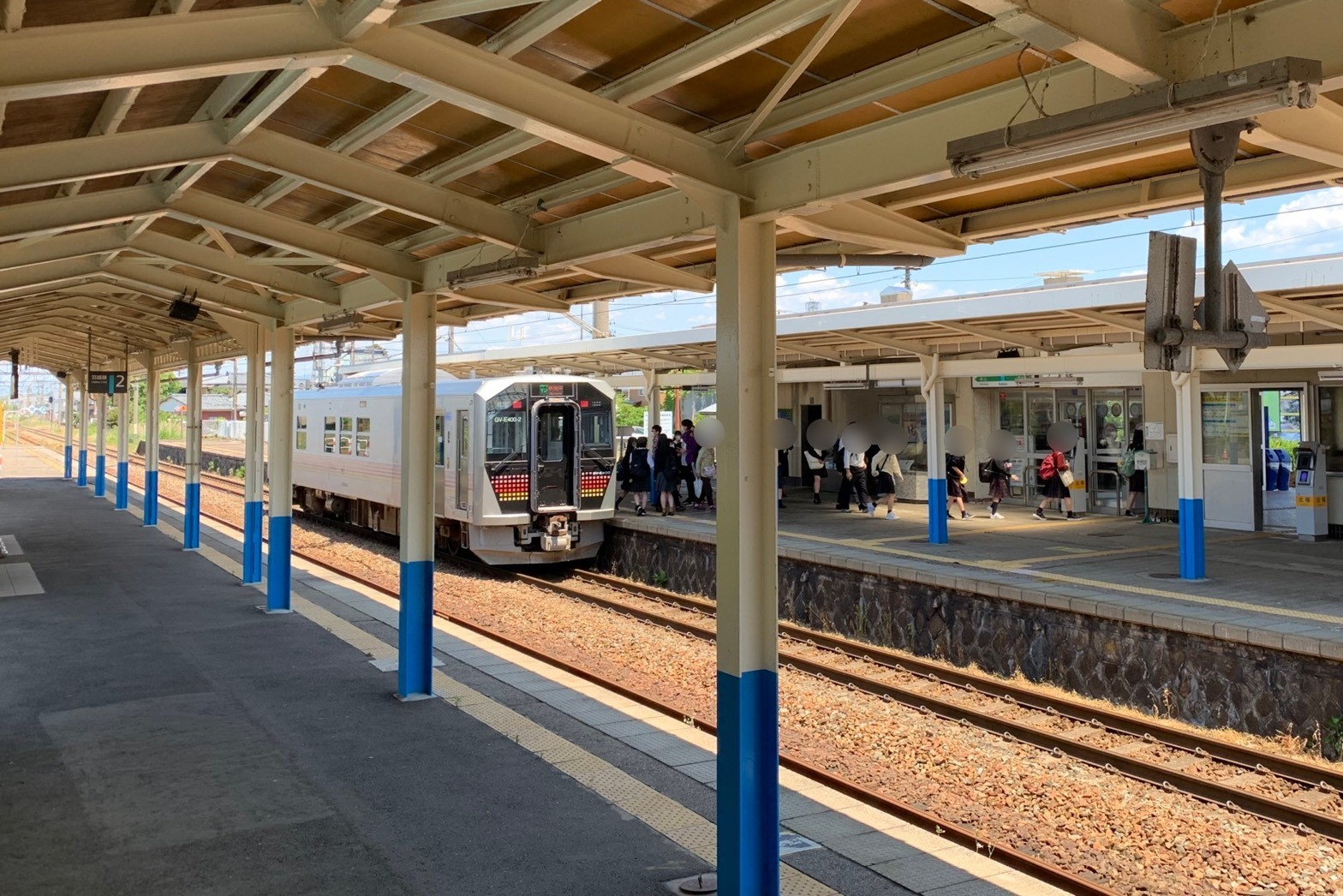
Platforms, May 2020

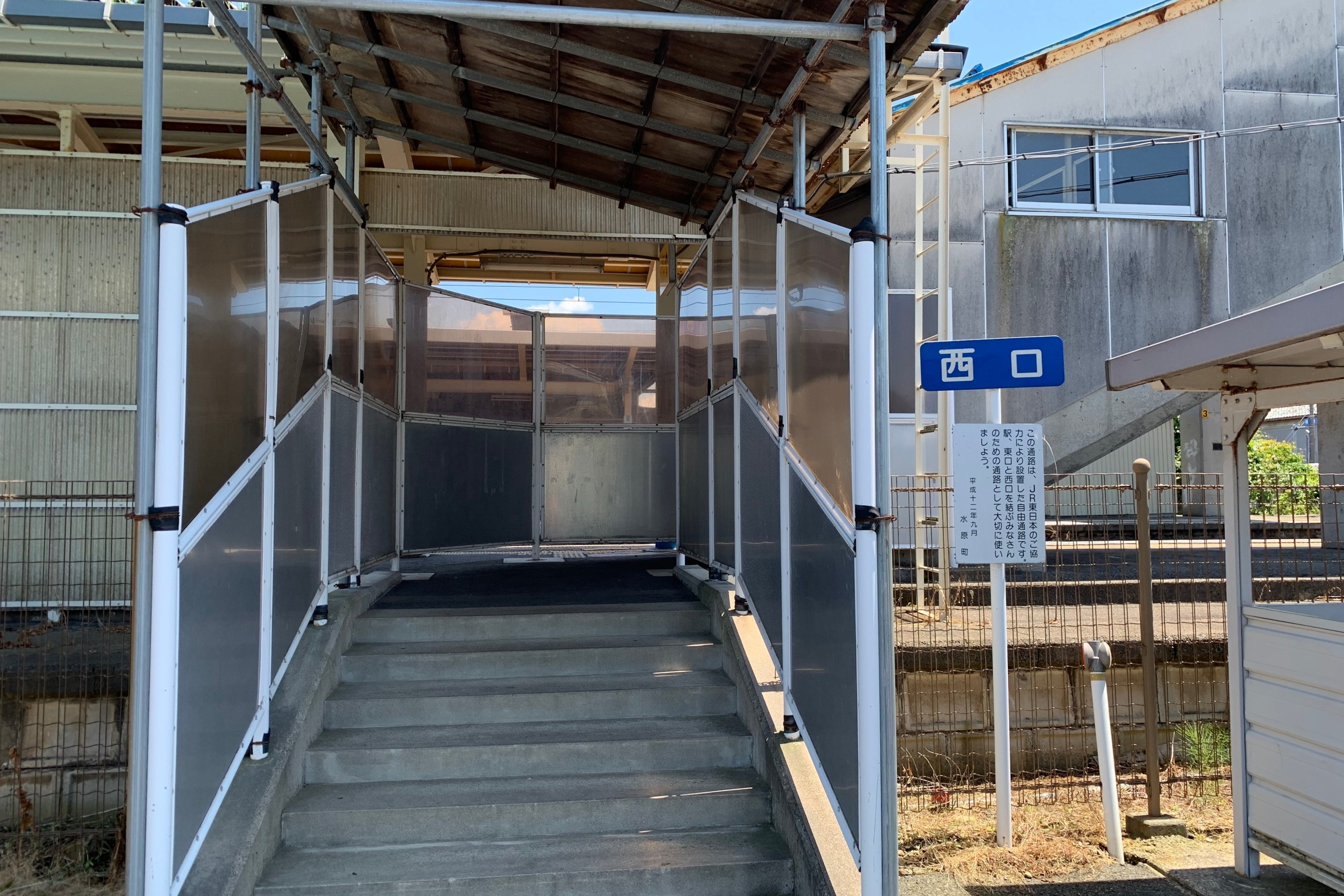
West side of Suibara Station, May 2020

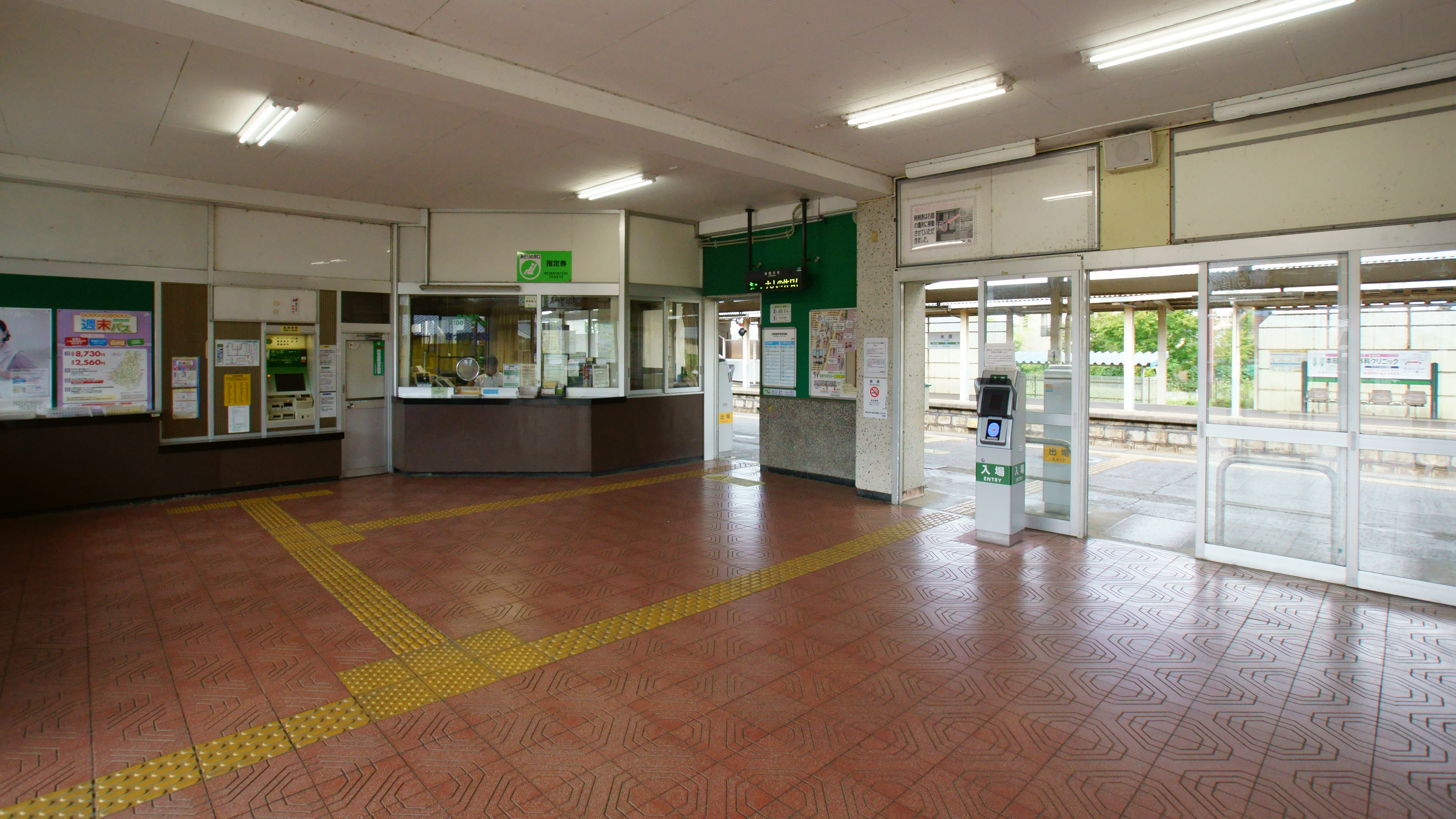
Gate, September 2016

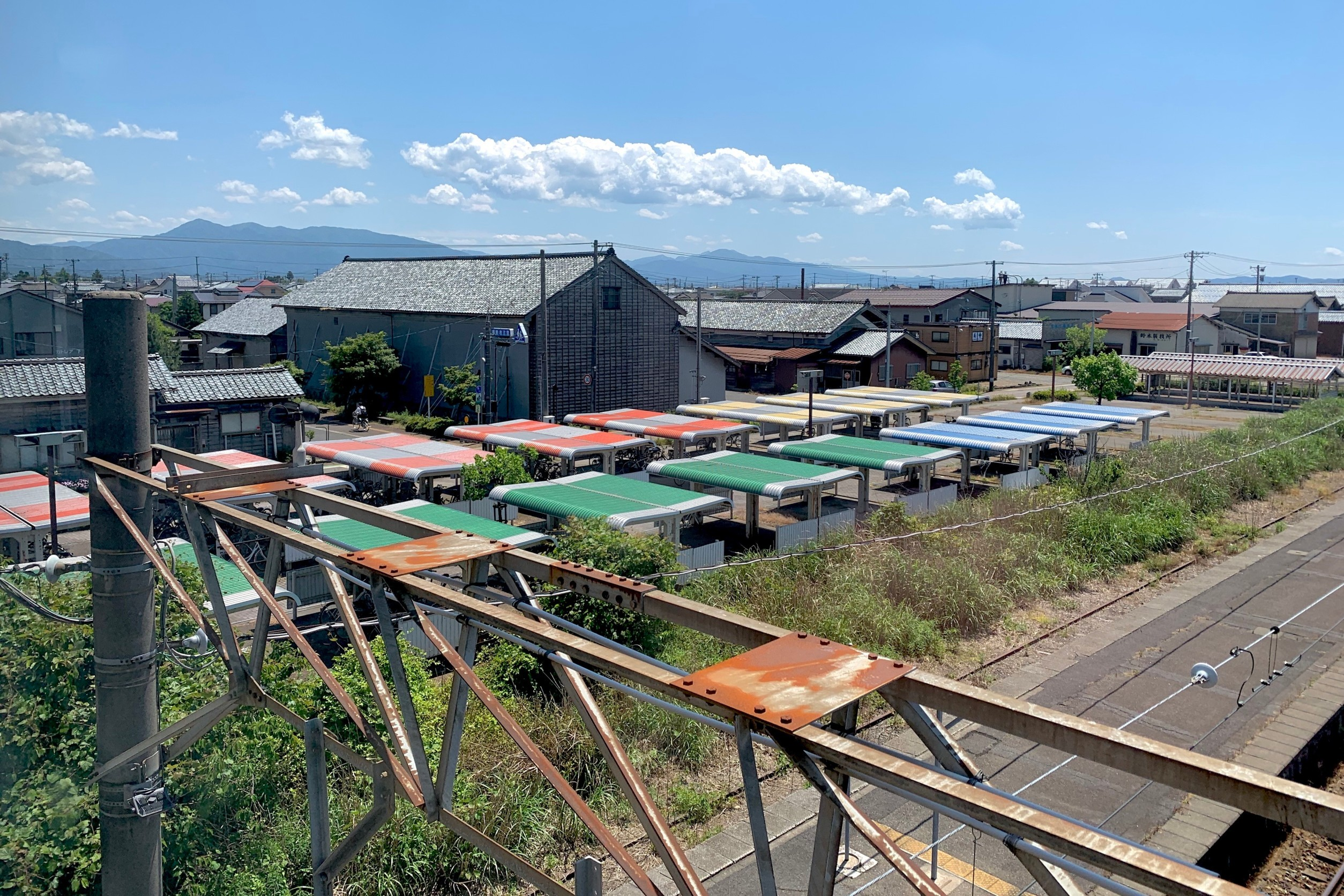
Bicycle parking, May 2020

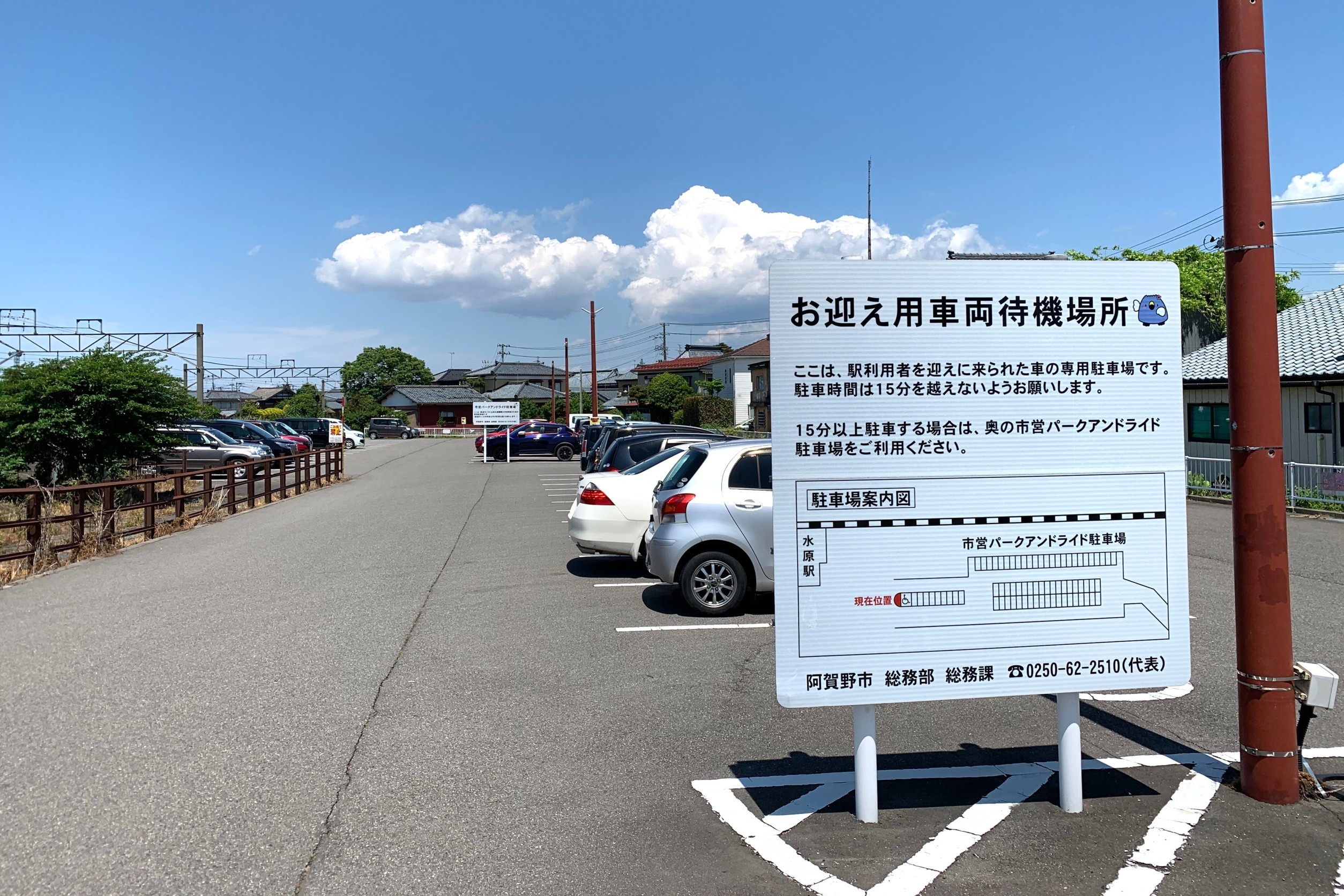
Kiss and ride waiting zone, May 2020

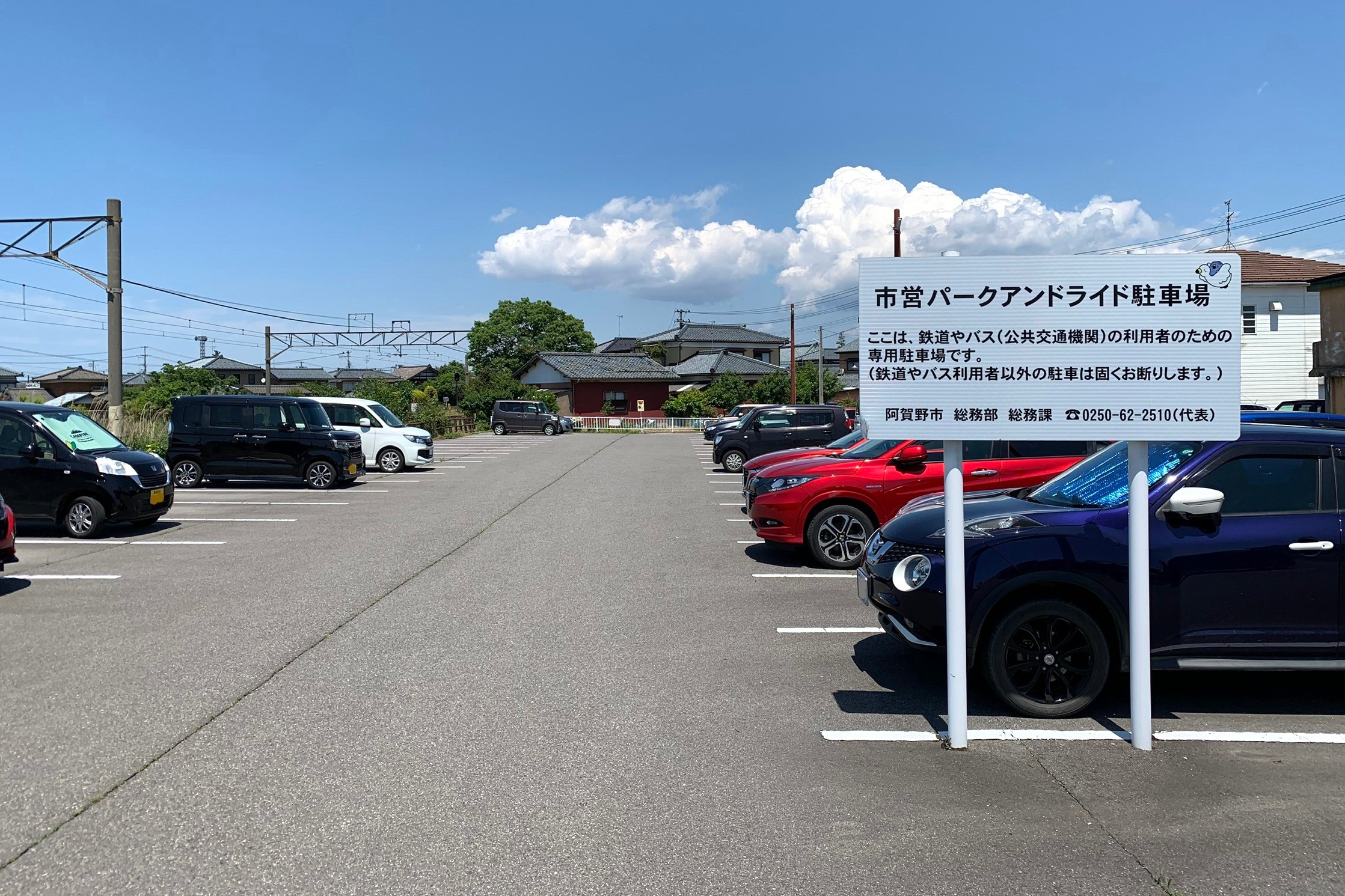
Park and ride parking, May 2020

=== Platforms ===
1	■ Uetsu Main Line	for Niitsu for Shibata, Murakami
2	■ Uetsu Main Line	(siding)

== History ==
Suibara Station opened on 2 September 1912. With the privatization of Japanese National Railways (JNR) on 1 April 1987, the station came under the control of JR East.

== Passenger statistics ==
In fiscal 2017, the station was used by an average of 787 passengers daily (boarding passengers only).

== Surrounding area ==
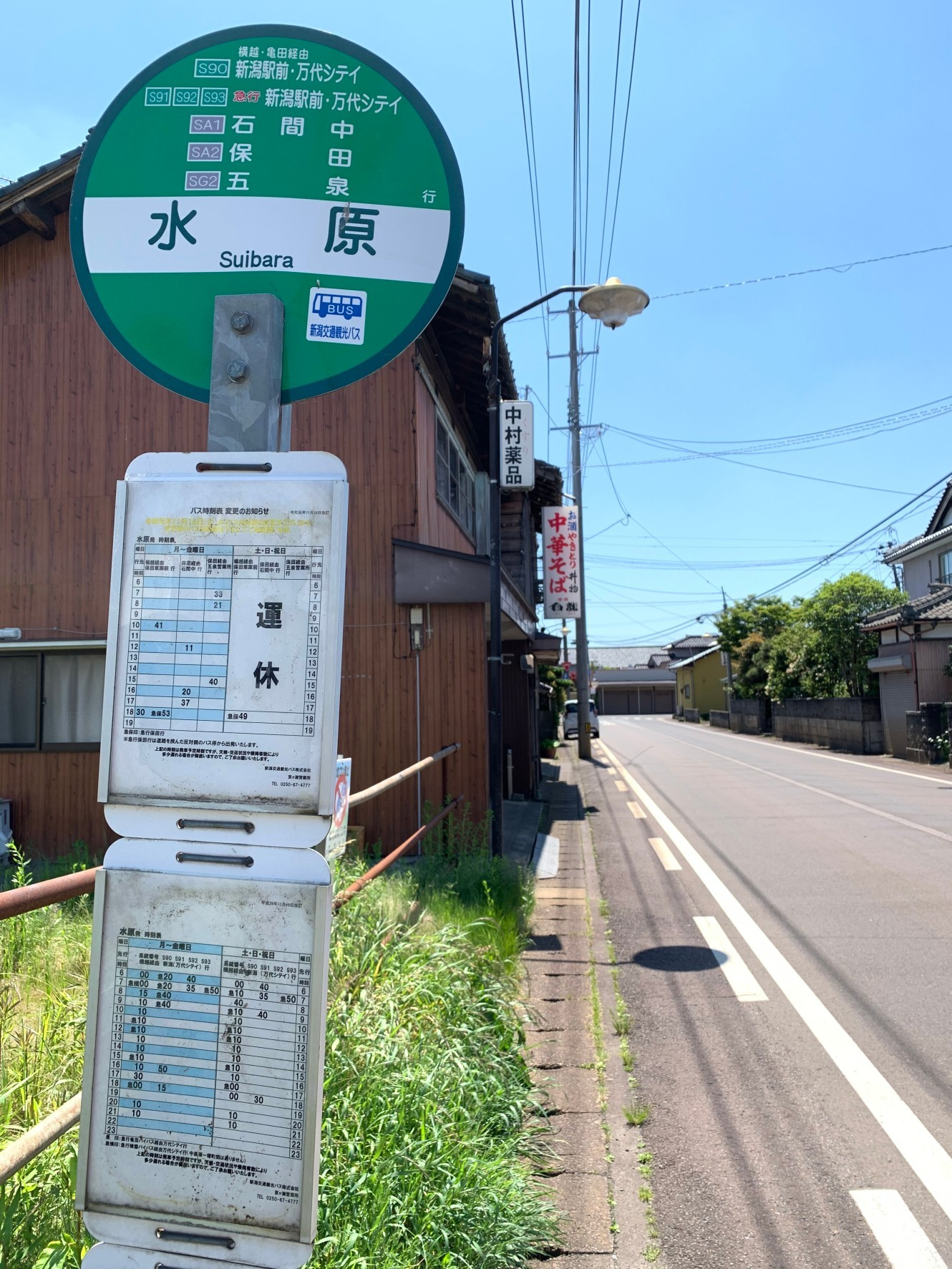
Niigata Kotsu Kanko Bus Suibara bus stop in front of the station, May 2020

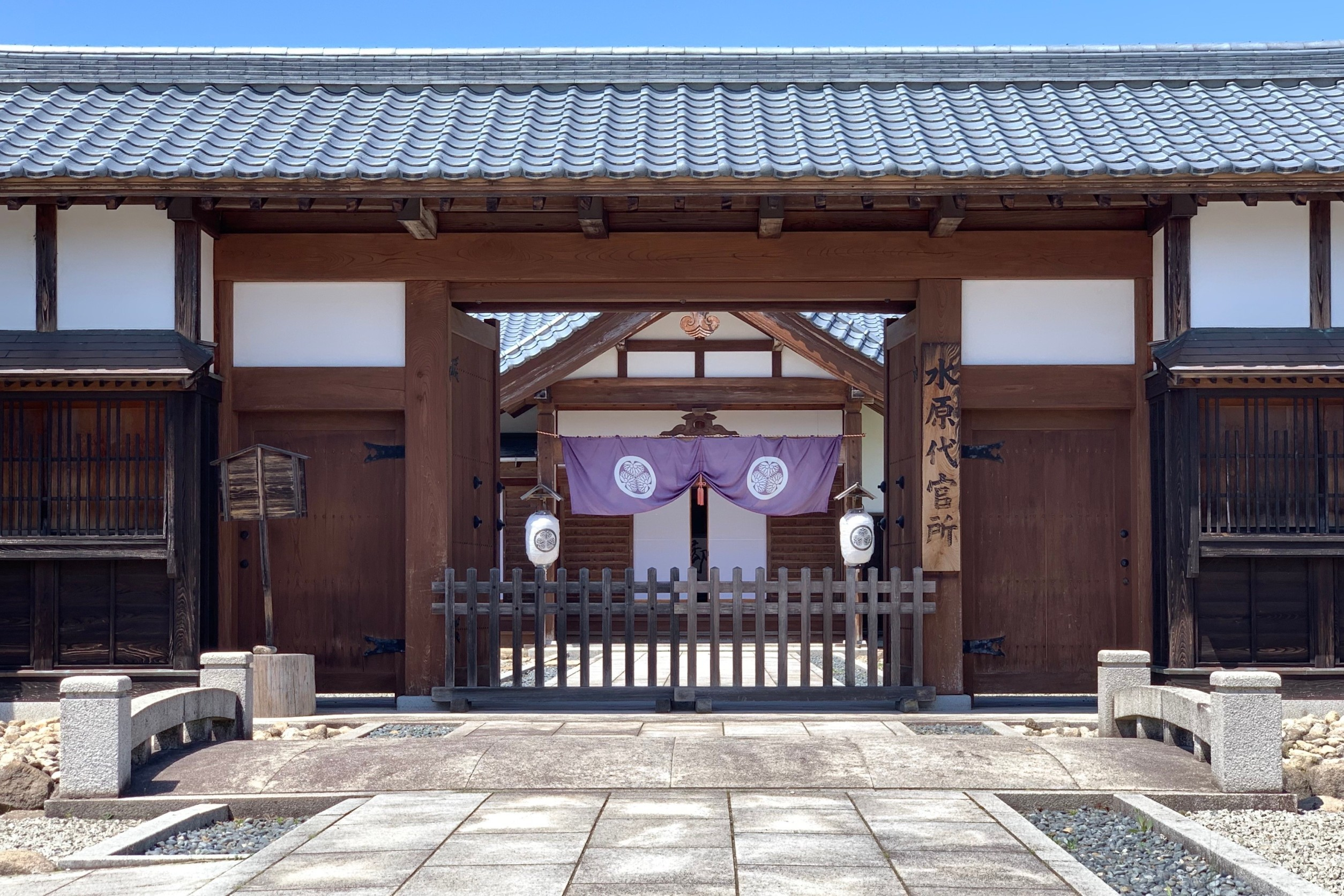
Suibara Magistrate's Office

- Agano City Hall
- Agano Post Office
- Niigata Prefectural Agano High School
- Agano Elementary School
- Suibara Elementary School
- Suibara Magistrate's Office
- Lake Hyōko
- National Route 460
- National Route 49

== See also ==
- List of railway stations in Japan
