= Bunji Miura =

Japanese painter

- Born: 1906; Agano, Japan
- Died: 1994 (aged 87–88)
- Occupation: Painter

Bunji Miura (1906 – 1994) was a Japanese painter. His work was part of the painting event in the art competition at the 1936 Summer Olympics.
