= Kyōgase Station =

Railway station in Agano, Niigata Prefecture, Japan

Kyōgase Station 京ヶ瀬駅
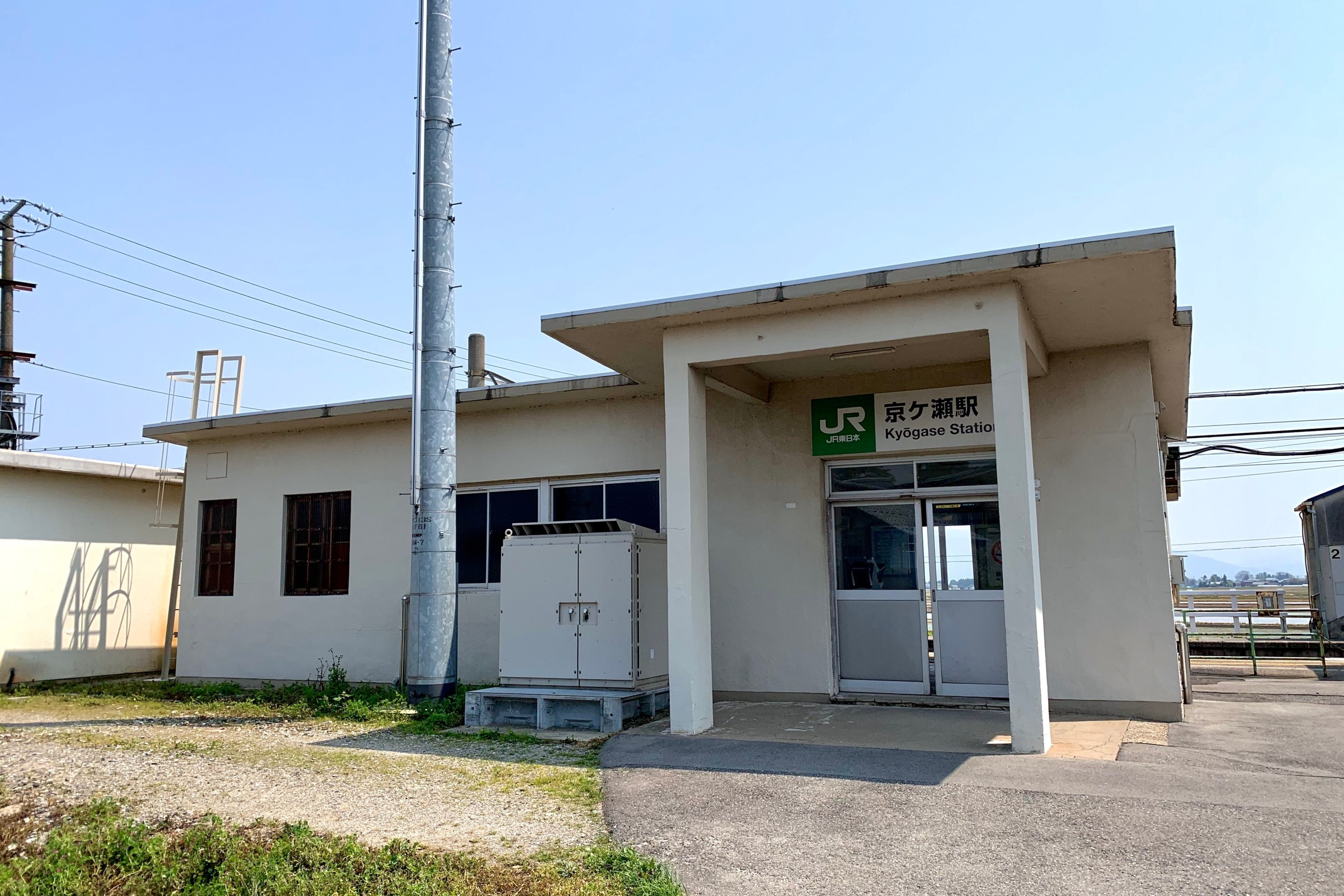
- North side of Kyōgase Station, May 2020

General information
- Location: 453 Kogawara, Agano-shi, Niigata-ken 959-2134; Japan
- Coordinates: 37°49′3.57″N 139°10′41.96″E
- Operator: JR East
- Line: ■ Uetsu Main Line
- Platforms: 2 side platforms
- Tracks: 2

Other information
- Status: Unstaffed
- Website: Official website

History
- Opened: 1 April 1962

Services
Preceding station	JR East	Following station
Niitsu Terminus	Uetsu Main Line	Suibara towards Akita
Location
- Location within Japan

Kyōgase Station (京ヶ瀬駅, Kyōgase-eki) is a railway station in the city of Agano, Niigata, Japan, operated by East Japan Railway Company (JR East).

== Lines ==
Kyōgase Station is served by the Uetsu Main Line, and is 6.1 kilometers from the terminus of the line at Niitsu Station.

== Station layout ==
The station consists of two ground-level opposed side platforms serving two tracks with the platforms connected by a footbridge. However, only one of the platforms is normally in use, and serves bi-directional traffic. The station is unattended.

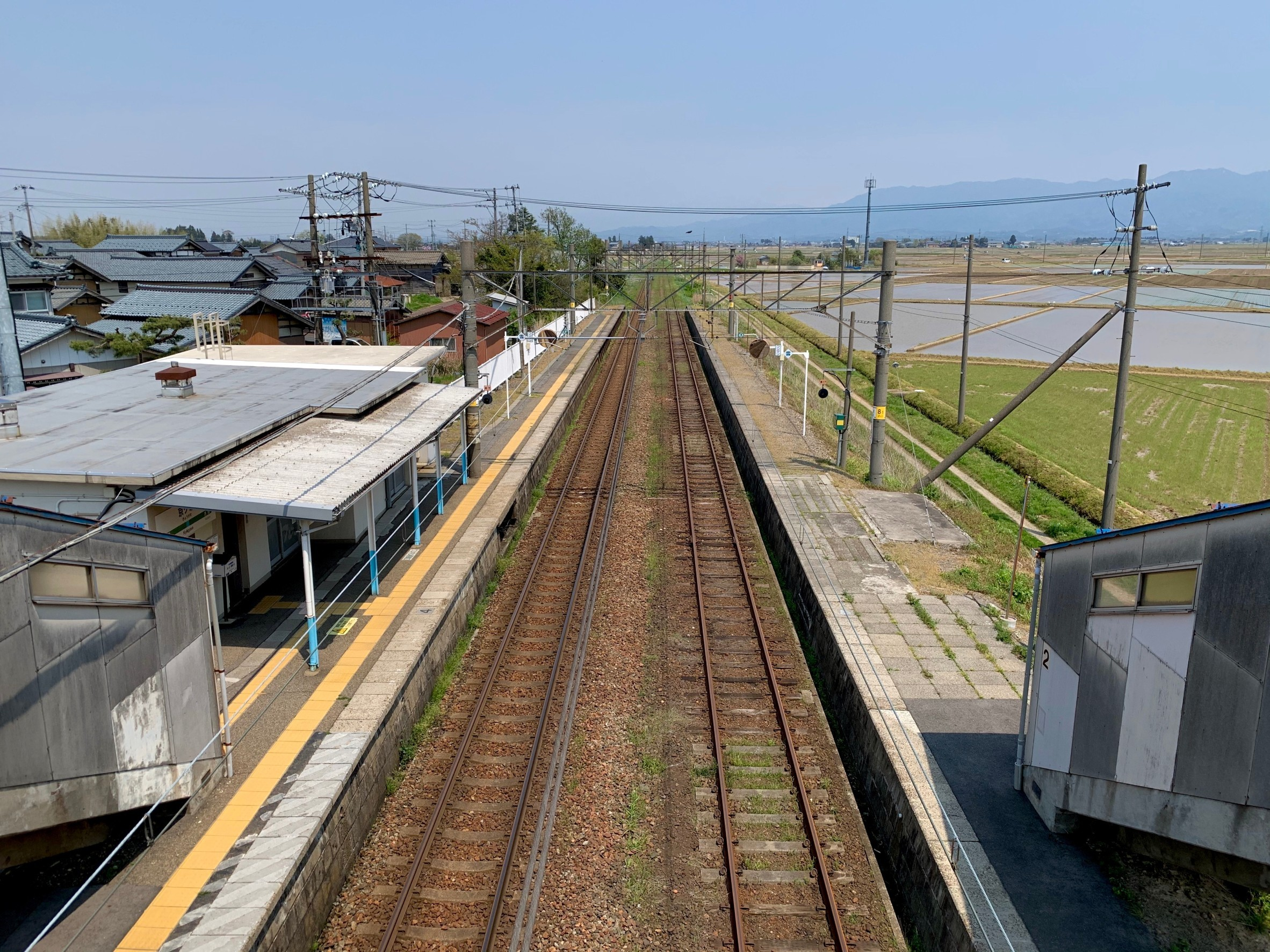
Platforms, May 2020
Left:platform No.1, Right:platform No.2

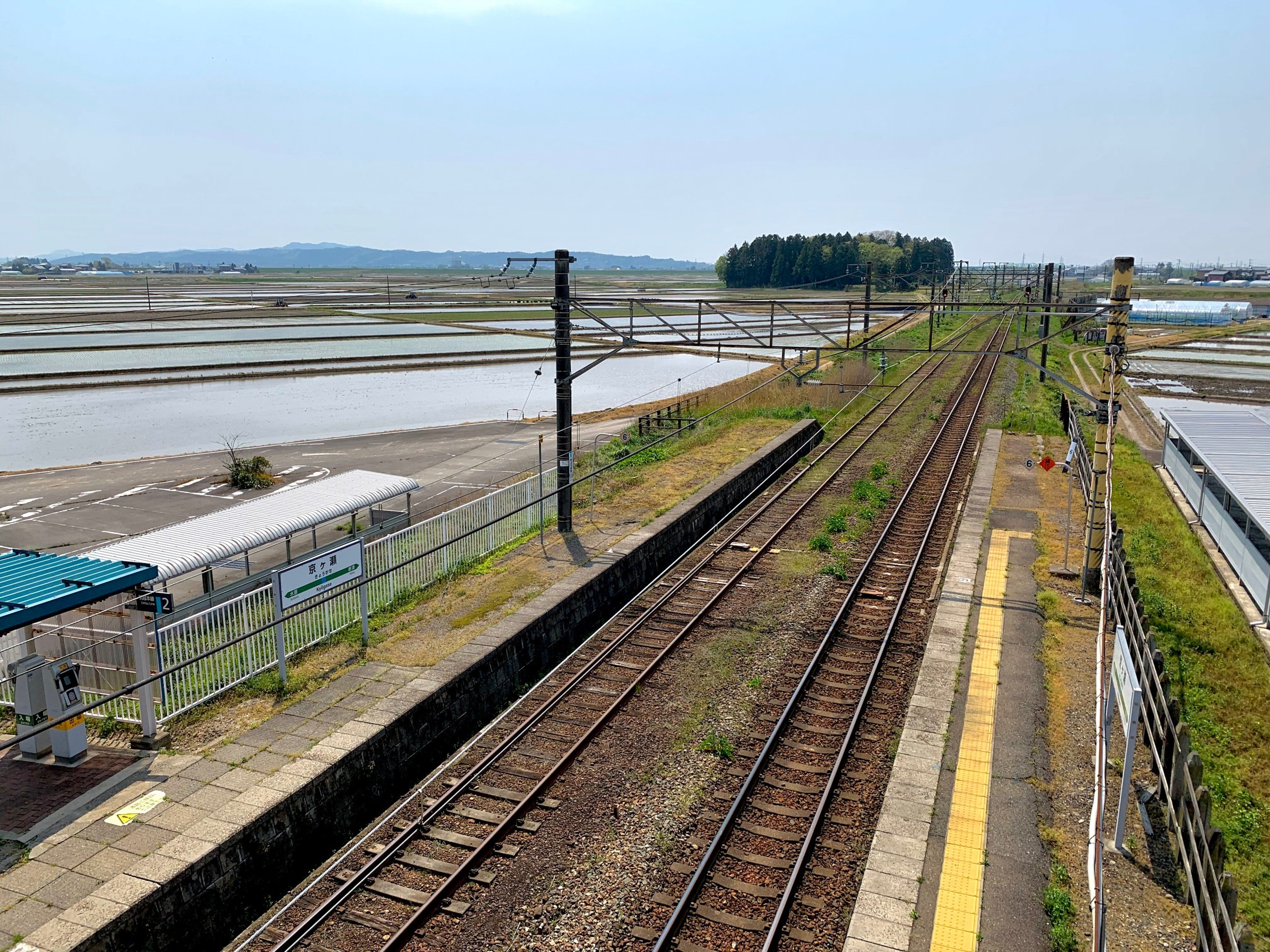
Platforms, May 2020
Left:platform No.2, Right:platform No.1

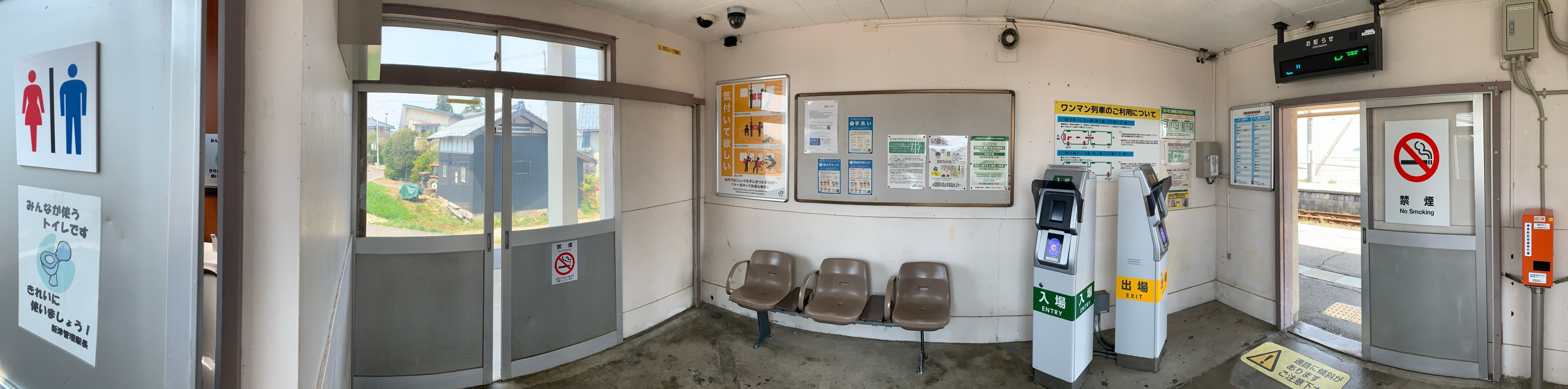
Station interior, May 2020

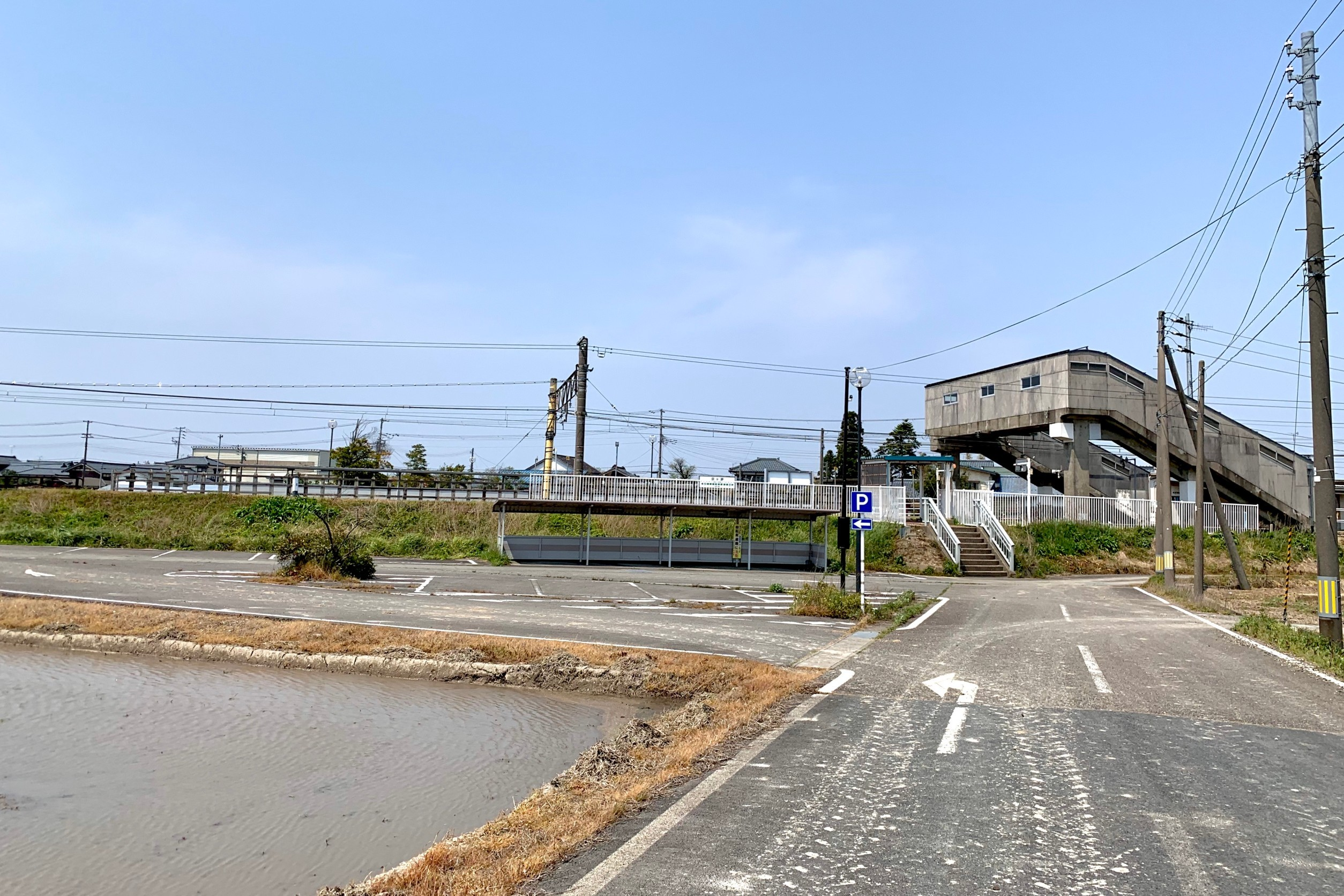
South side of Kyōgase Station, May 2020

=== Platforms ===
1	■ Uetsu Main Line	for Niitsu for Shibata, Murakami
2	■ Uetsu Main Line	(siding)

== History ==
Kyōgase Station opened on 30 September 1943 as a signal stop. It became a full station on 1 April 1962. With the privatization of Japanese National Railways (JNR) on 1 April 1987, the station came under the control of JR East.

== Surrounding area ==
The station is located in a rural area, surrounded by rice fields. There are few buildings nearby.

== See also ==
- List of railway stations in Japan
