= Kamiyama Station =

Railway station in Agano, Niigata Prefecture, Japan

Kamiyama Station 神山駅
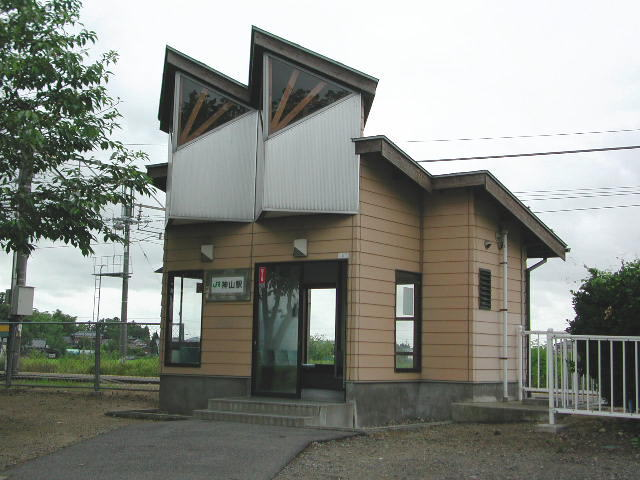
- Kamiyama Station, July 2007

General information
- Location: 1138 Funai, Agano-shi, Niigata-ken 959-1976; Japan
- Coordinates: 37°51′45.5″N 139°14′40.9″E
- Operator: JR East
- Line: ■ Uetsu Main Line
- Platforms: 2 side platforms
- Tracks: 2

Other information
- Status: Unstaffed
- Website: Official website

History
- Opened: 20 January 1955

Services
Preceding station	JR East	Following station
Suibara towards Niitsu	Uetsu Main Line	Tsukioka towards Akita
Location
- Location within Japan

Kamiyama Station (神山駅, Kamiyama eki) is a railway station in the city of Agano, Niigata, Japan, operated by East Japan Railway Company (JR East).

== Lines ==
Kamiyama Station is served by the Uetsu Main Line, and is 13.9 kilometers from the terminus of the line at Niitsu Station.

== Station layout ==
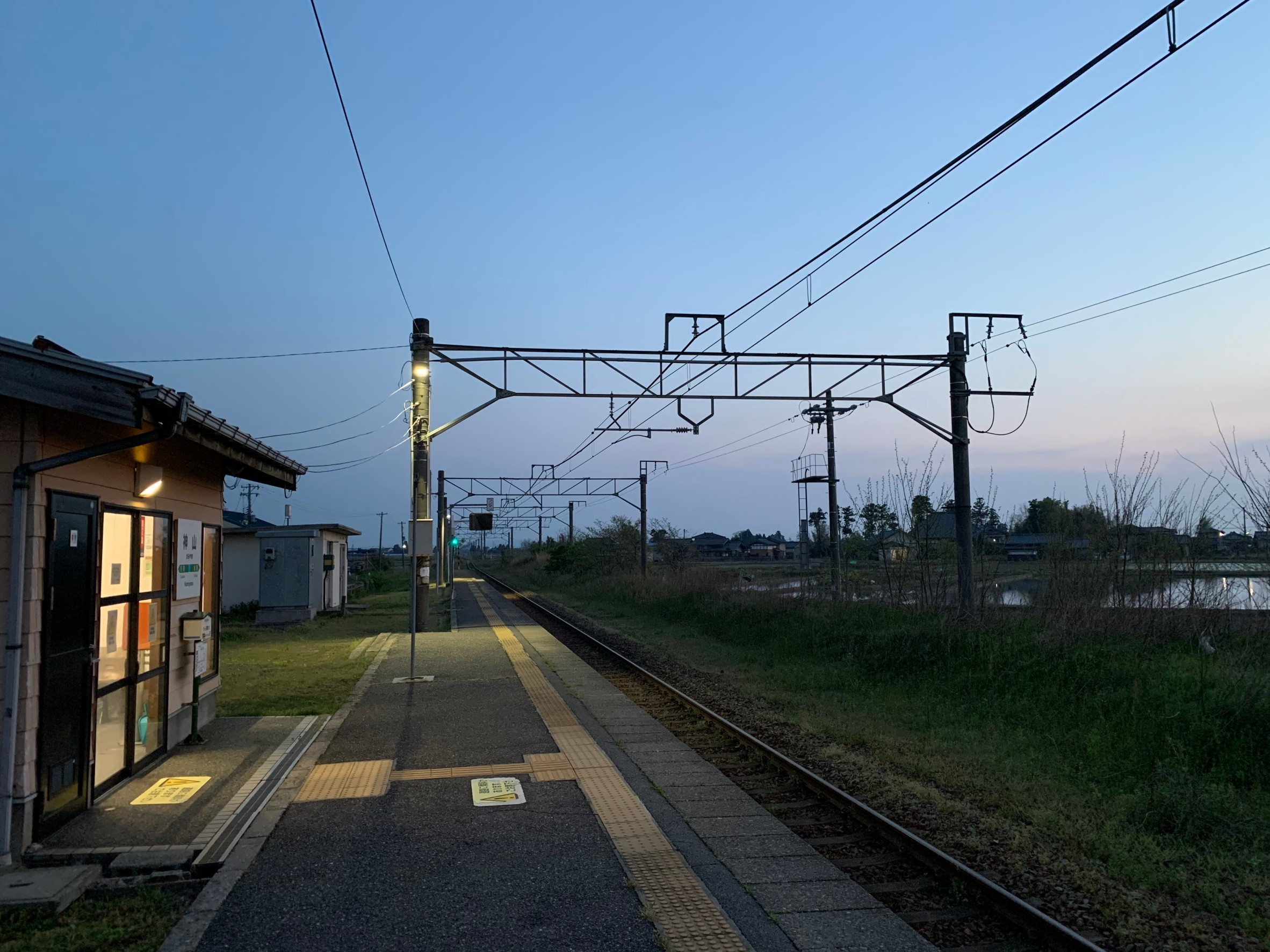
Platform, May 2020

The station consists of one ground-level side platform serving a single bi-directional track. The station is unattended.

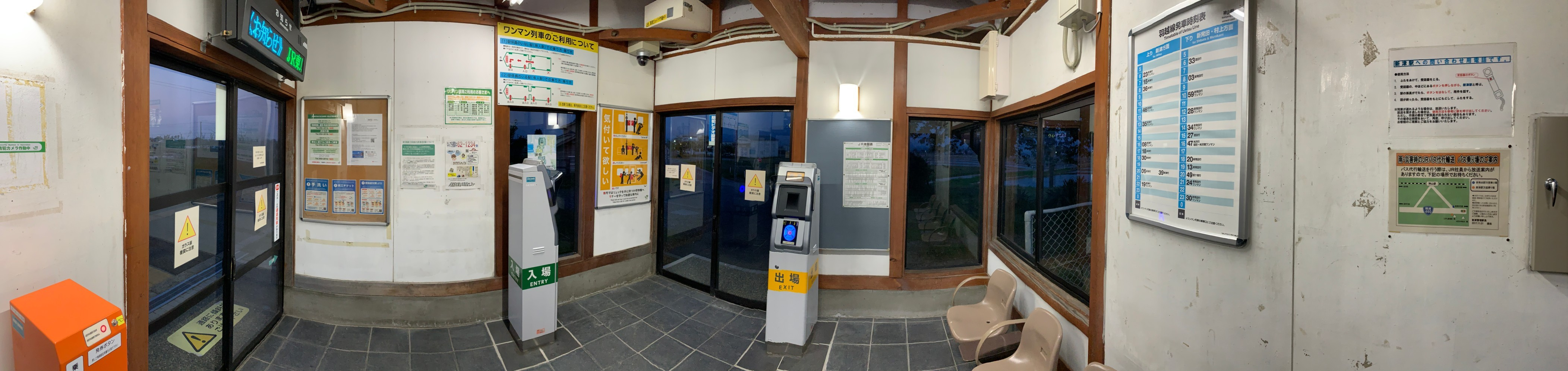
Station interior, May 2020

== History ==
Kamiyama Station opened on 28 September 1944 as a signal stop. It was elevated to a full station on 20 January 1955. With the privatization of Japanese National Railways (JNR) on 1 April 1987, the station came under the control of JR East.

== Surrounding area ==
The station is located in a rural area, surrounded by rice fields. There are few buildings nearby.

== See also ==
- List of railway stations in Japan
