= Agano, Niigata =

Agano 阿賀野市
- City
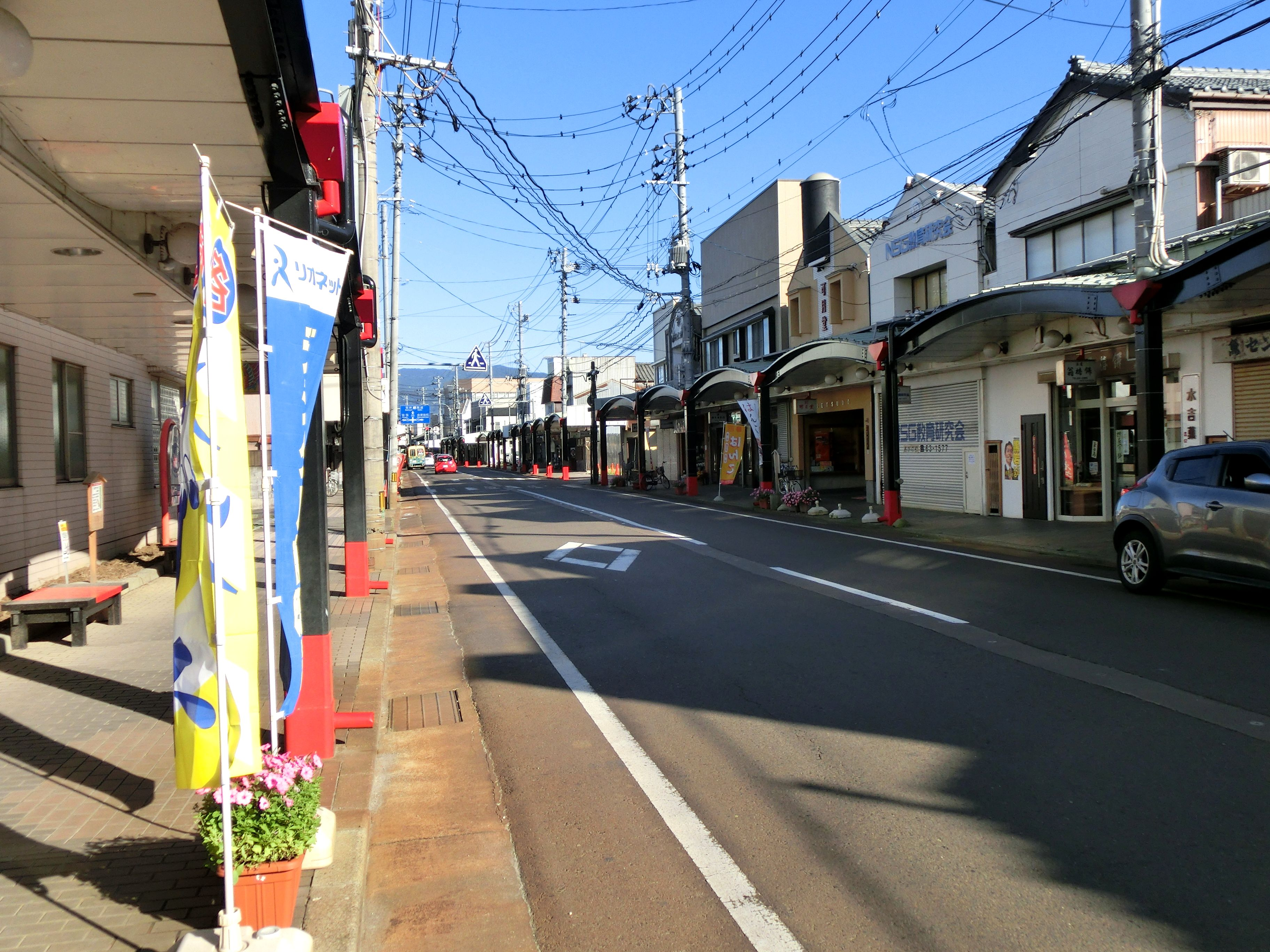
- Central Suibara, center of Agano city

- Flag Seal

- Location of Agano in Niigata Prefecture

- Coordinates: 37°50′4″N 139°13′33.6″E
- Country: Japan
- Region: Chūbu (Kōshin'etsu) (Hokuriku)
- Prefecture: Niigata

Government
  - Mayor: Hiroyuki Katō (since April 2024)

Area
  - Total: 192.74 km^{2} (74.42 sq mi)

Population (July 1, 2019)
  - Total: 41,204
  - Density: 213.78/km^{2} (553.69/sq mi)
- Time zone: UTC+9 (Japan Standard Time)
- Symbols
  - Tree: Sakura
  - Flower: Cosmos
  - Bird: Swan
- Phone number: 0250-62-2510
- Address: 10–15 Okayama, Agano-shi, Niigata-ken 959–2092
- Website: Official website

Agano (阿賀野市, Agano-shi; Japanese pronunciation: [ä̀.ɡä́.nó̞(.ɕì), -ŋä́-]) is a city located in Niigata Prefecture, Japan. As of 1 July 2019, the city had an estimated population of 41,204 in 14,417 households, and a population density of 214 persons per km^{2}. The total area of the city is 192.74 square kilometres (74.42 sq mi).

== Geography ==
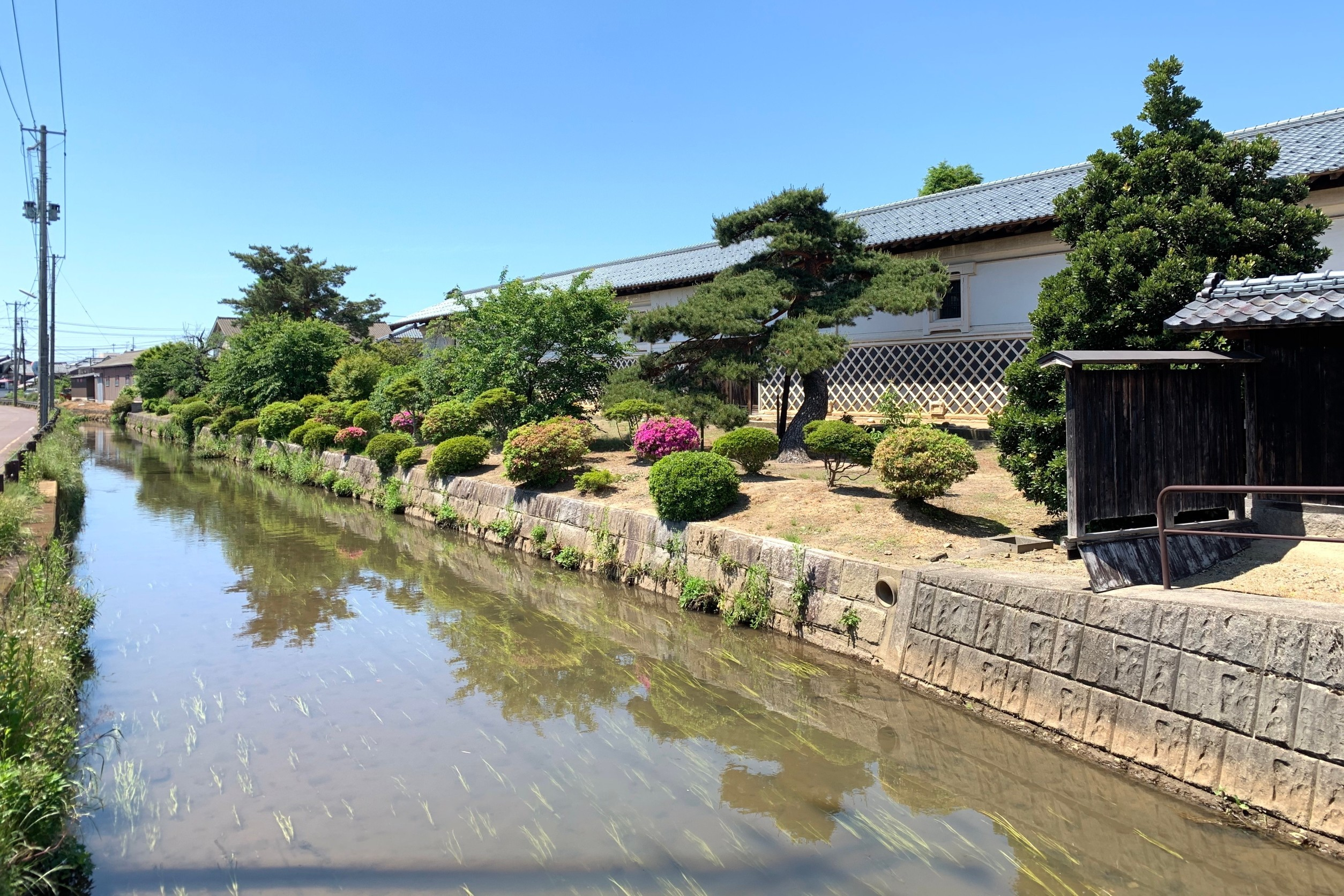
Komabayashi River

Agano is located in an inland region of north-central Niigata Prefecture. As the city name implies, the Agano River flows through the west side of the city. The highest elevation is the summit of Mount Gozu at 912 meters. Approximately one third of the city area is covered in mountains and forests, and slightly over one third is farmland.

=== Surrounding municipalities ===
- Niigata Prefecture
  - Aga
  - Akiha-ku, Niigata
  - Gosen
  - Kita-ku, Niigata
  - Kōnan-ku, Niigata
  - Shibata
  - Tagami

== Climate ==
Agano has a humid subtropical climate (Köppen Cfa) characterized by warm, wet summers and cold winters with heavy snowfall. The average annual temperature in Agano is 13.2 °C. The average annual rainfall is 1874 mm with September as the wettest month. The temperatures are highest on average in August, at around 24.6 °C, and lowest in January, at around 1.4 °C.

== Demographics ==
Per Japanese census data, the population of Agano was relatively stable throughout the late 20th century but has declined in the 21st.

Historical population
Year	Pop.	±%
1970	47,582	—
1980	47,490	−0.2%
1990	48,465	+2.1%
2000	48,456	−0.0%
2010	45,560	−6.0%
2020	40,696	−10.7%

== History ==
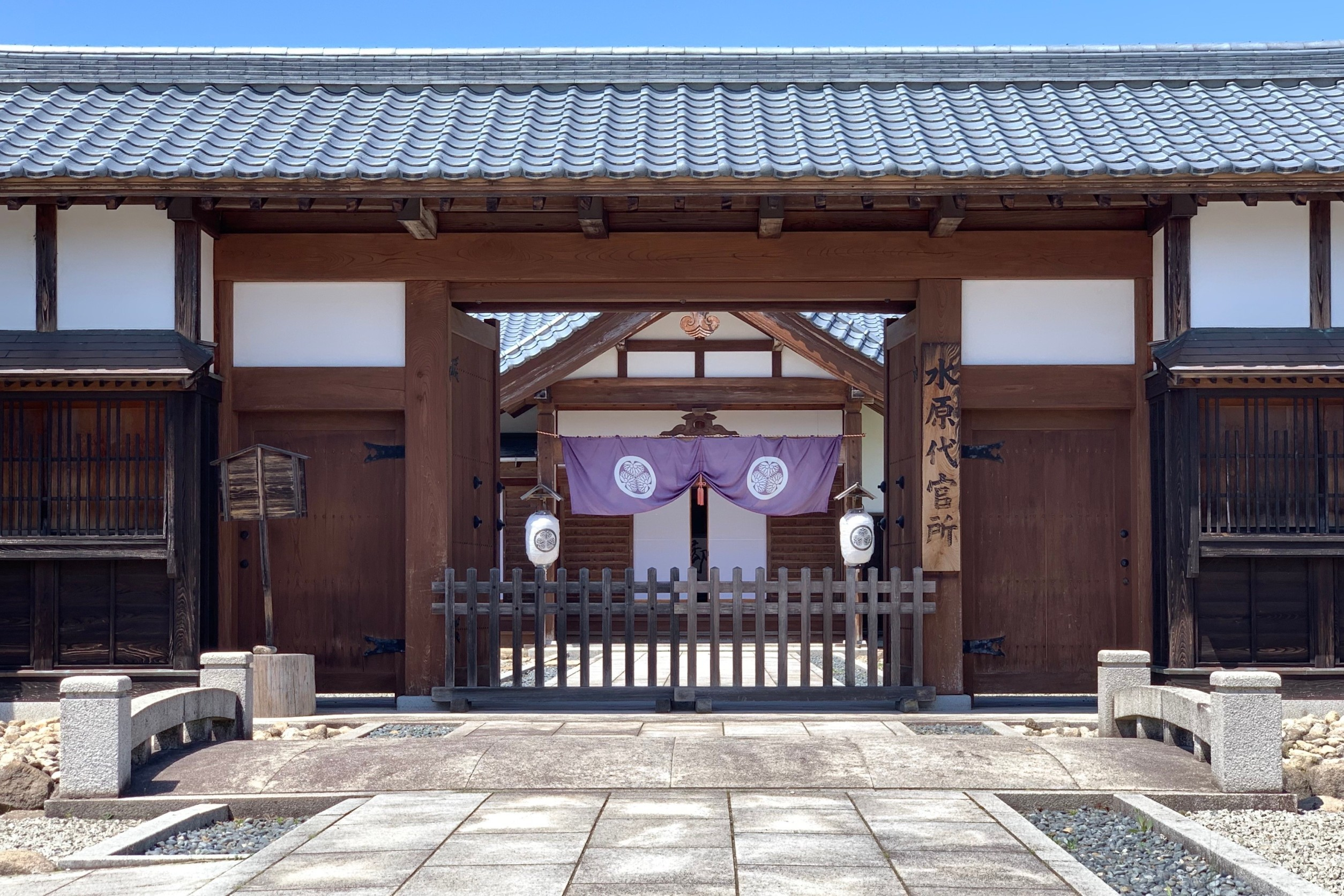
Suibara Magistrate's Office

4 former municipalities merged to establish Agano City (Suibara, Yasuda, Kyōgase and Sasakami)

The area of present-day Agano was part of ancient Echigo Province. During the Edo period the area was divided between territories controlled by Shibata Domain, Murakami Domain and tenryō territory held directly by the Tokugawa shogunate. The area was organised as part of Kitakanbara District, Niigata following the Meiji restoration, and the town of Suibara and villages of Yasuda, Kyōgase and Sasakami were established with the creation of the modern municipalities system on April 1, 1889. Yasuda was raised to town status in 1960. The city of Agano was established on April 1, 2004, with the merger of these four municipalities.

== Economy ==
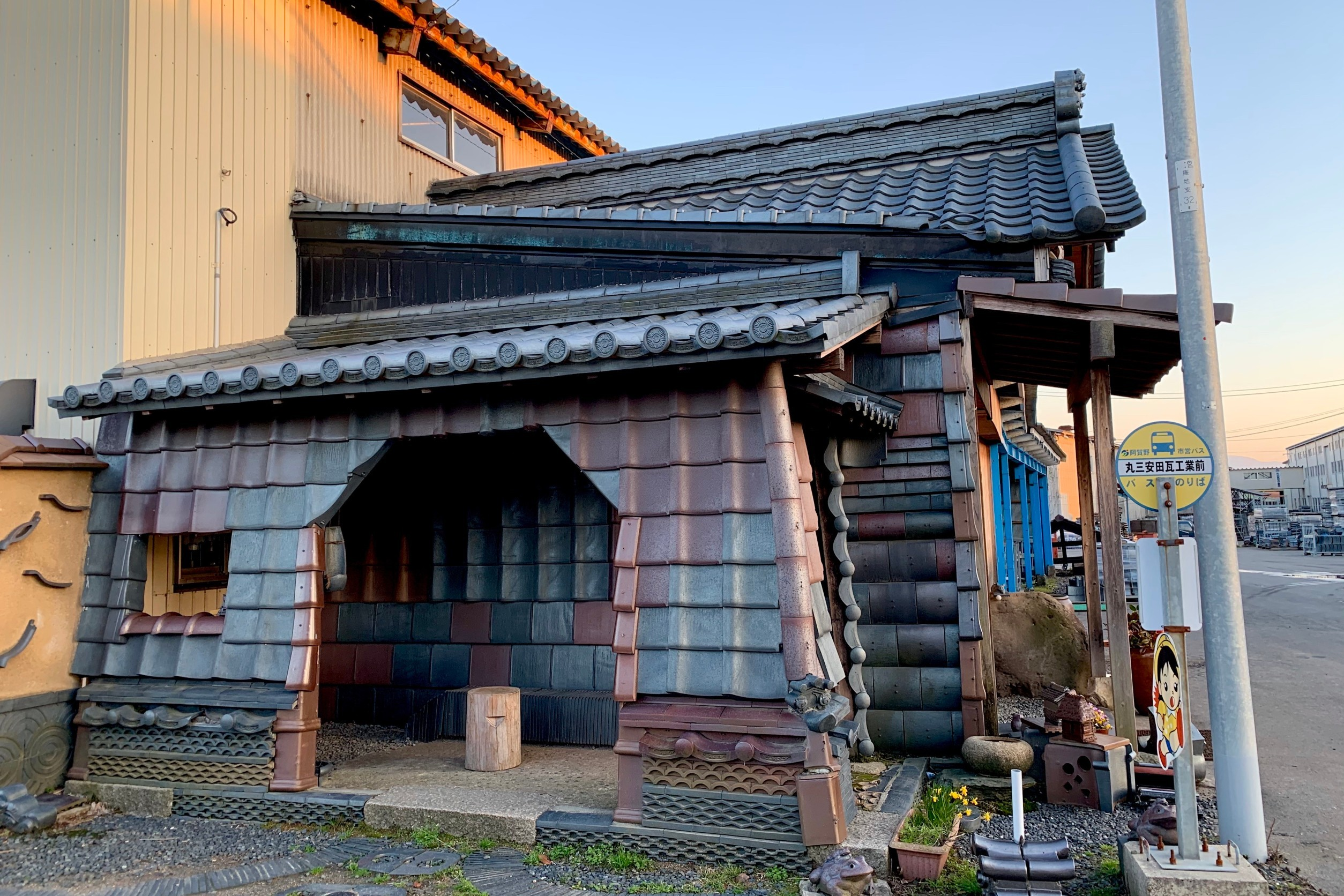
Yasuda roof tiles

The economy of Agano is dominated by agriculture, including livestock production and cut flowers, but paddy rice remains the dominant crop. In the manufacturing industry, the city has factories for the production of computer related parts manufacturing, food processing, furniture, ceramics and stone products.

== Government ==
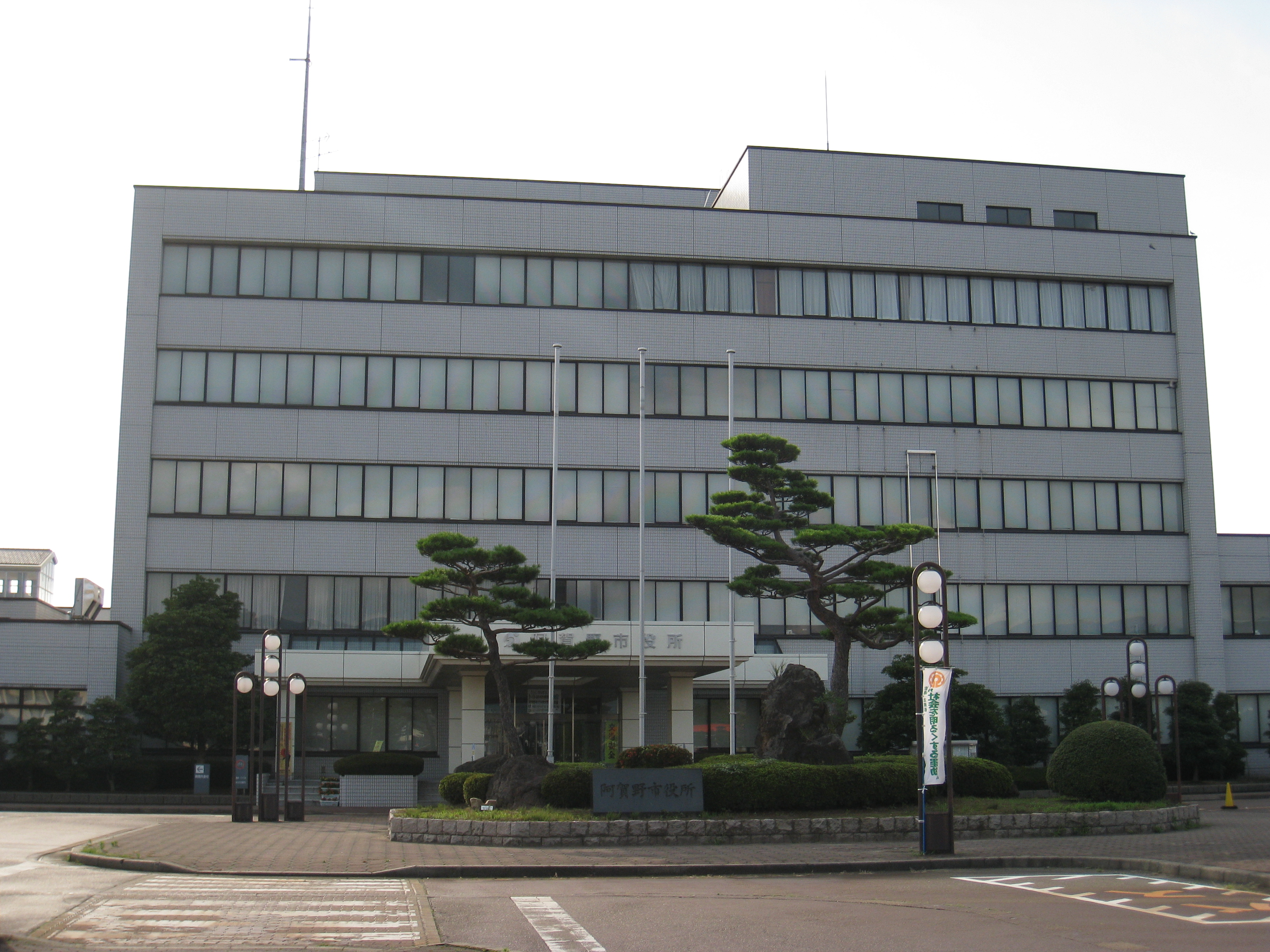
Agano City Hall

Agano has a mayor-council form of government with a directly elected mayor and a unicameral city legislature of 20 members.

== Education ==
Agano has eleven public elementary schools and four public junior high schools operated by the city government. There is one public high school operated by the Niigata Prefectural Board of Education. The prefecture also operates one special education school.

== Transportation ==
=== Railway ===
JR East – Uetsu Main Line

- Kyōgase – Suibara – Kamiyama

=== Highway ===
- Ban-etsu Expressway – Yasuda IC
- National Route 49
- National Route 290
- National Route 459
- National Route 460

== Local attractions ==
- Gozu onsen area (五頭温泉郷, Gozu onsen gō)
  - Deyu onsen (出湯温泉)
  - Murasugi onsen (村杉温泉)
  - Imaita onsen (今板温泉)
- Lake Hyōko (Ramsar site)
- Mount Gozu
- Suntopia World amusement park (サントピアワールド)
- Yasuda Tile Road (やすだ瓦ロード, Yasuda Kawara Road)
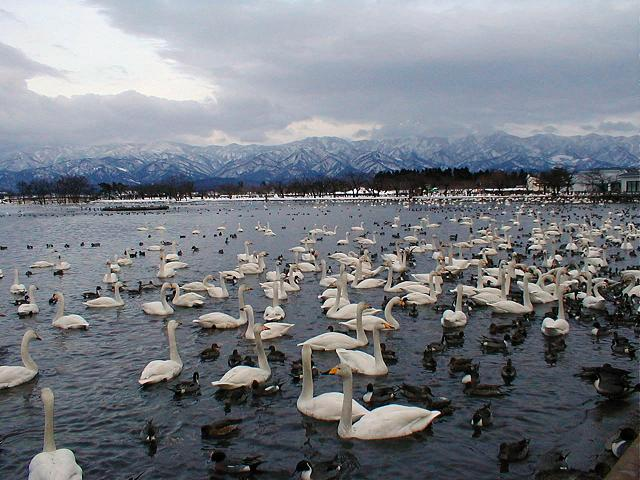
Lake Hyōko with overwintering swans

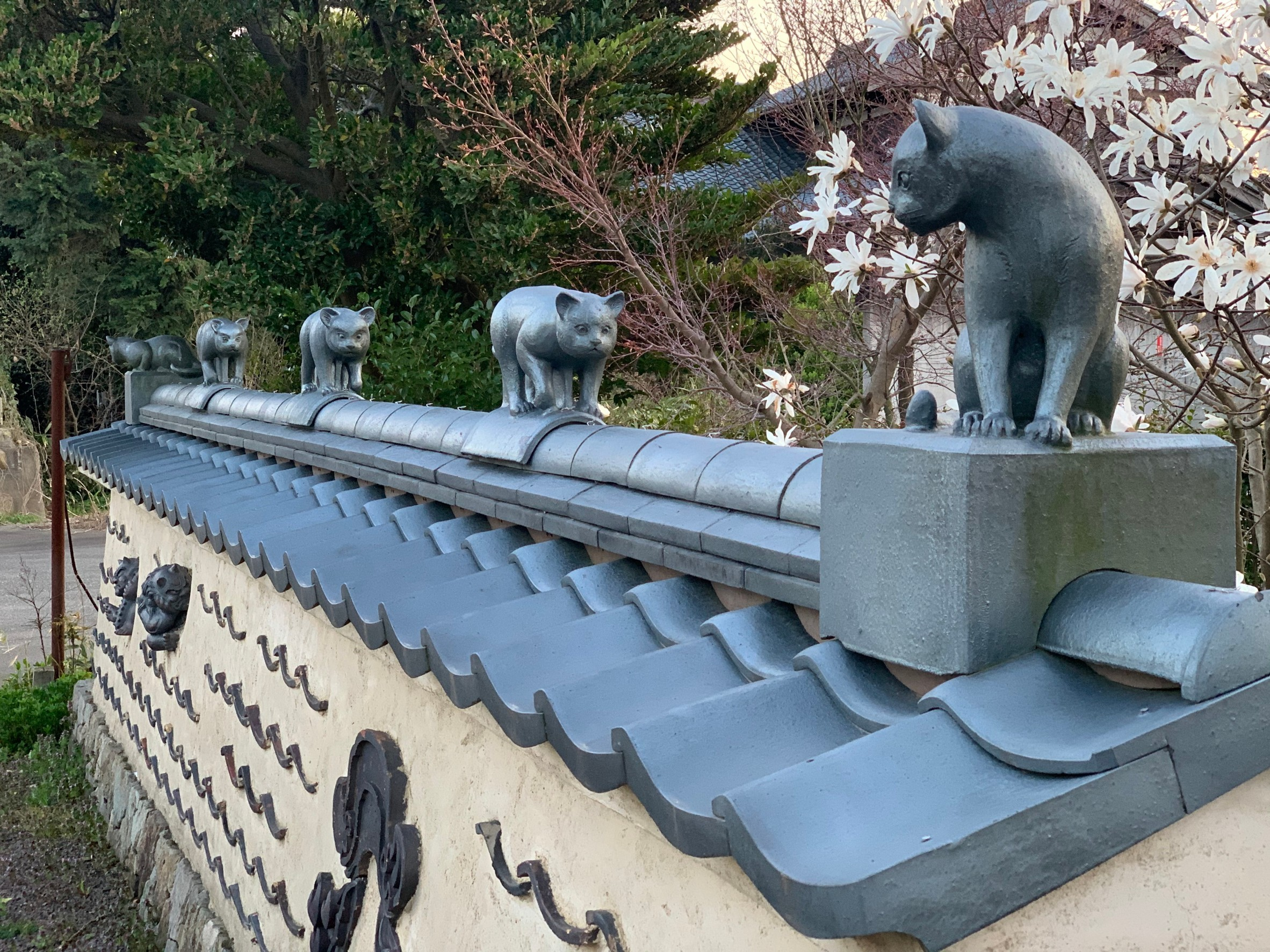
Yasuda Tile Road

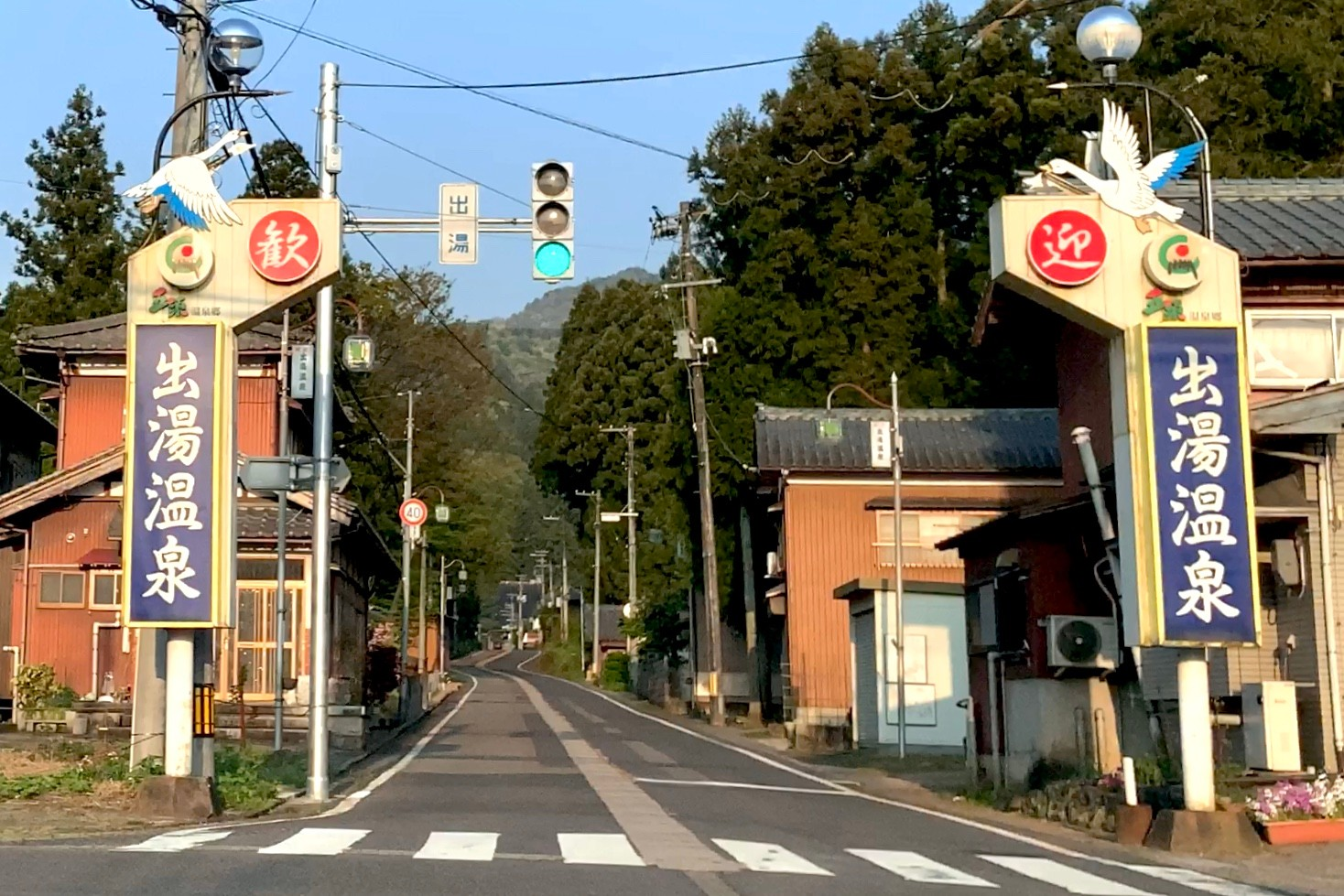
Deyu Onsen

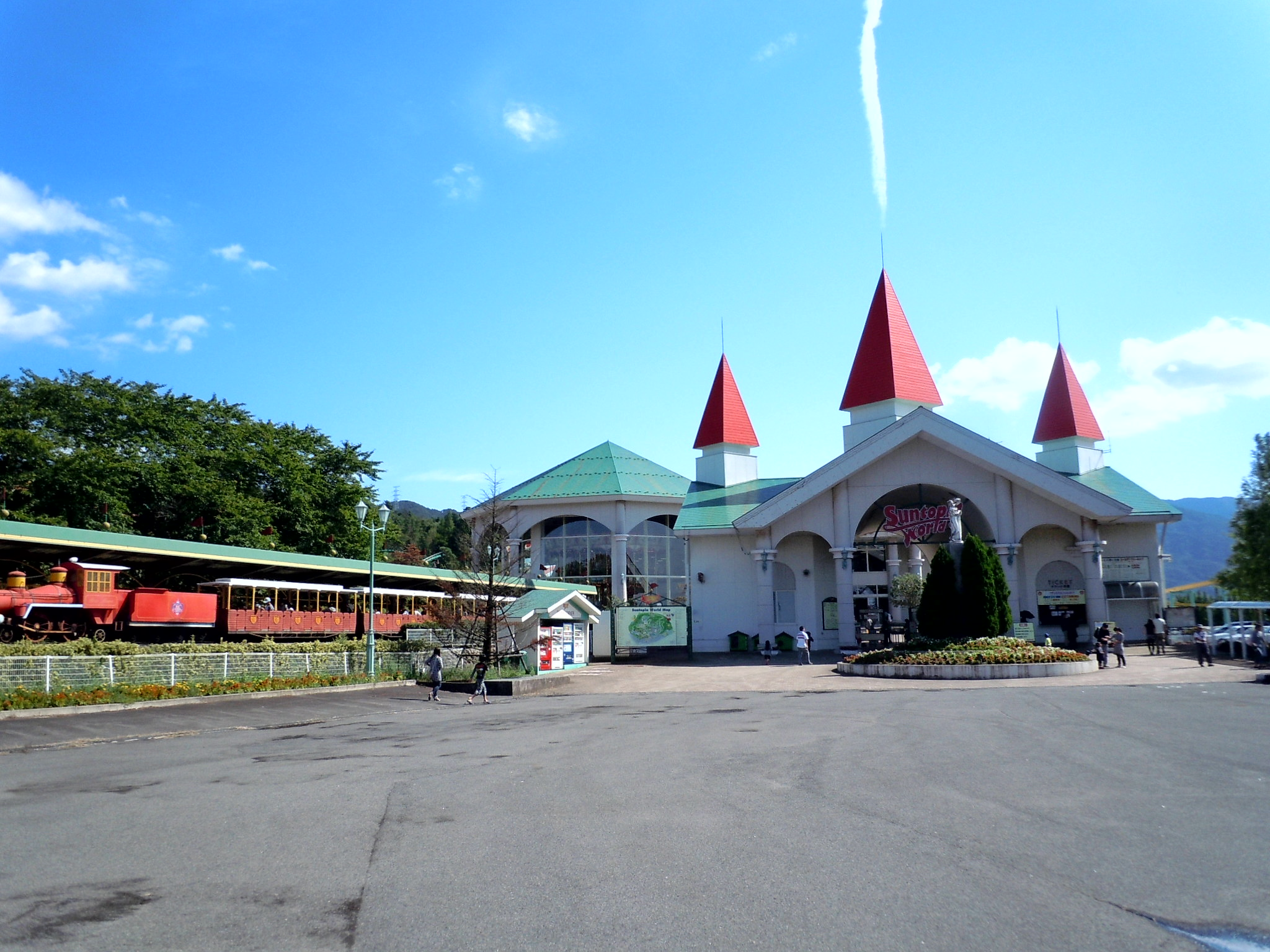
Suntopia World

=== Local foods ===
- Sasa-dango (笹団子): mochi dango balls filled with red bean paste, seasoned with mugwort and wrapped in bamboo leaves.
- Poppo-yaki (ぽっぽ焼き): steamed bread flavored with brown sugar.
- Yasuda yogurt (ヤスダヨーグルト)
- Sankaku aburaage (三角油揚)
- Swan Lake beer (スワンレイクビール)
- Hakuryū sake (白龍)
- Shimbo konnyaku (新保こんにゃく)

== Notable people from Agano ==
- Bunji Miura, Japanese painter
- Eishiro Saito, Japanese businessman
- Tomoaki Seino, Japanese former football player
- Kazuyuki Sekiguchi, Japanese musician and bassist (Southern All Stars)
