= Lake Hyōko =

- 瓢湖 (Japanese)
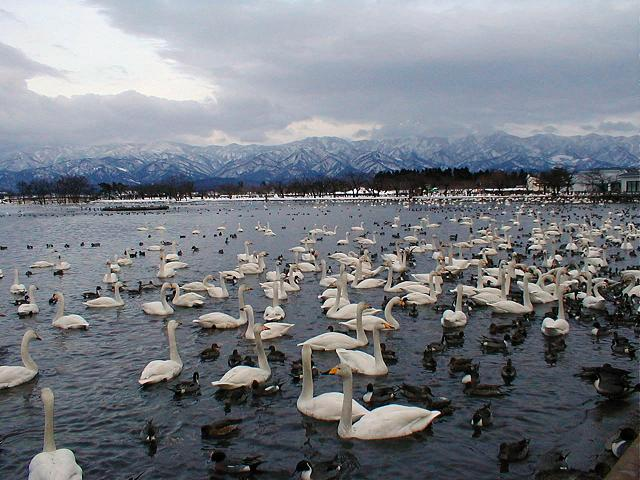
- Lake Hyōko in winter

- Location within Niigata Prefecture Location within Japan
- Coordinates: 37°50′18″N 139°14′14″E
- Built: 1639
- Surface area: 8 ha (20 acres)
- Max. depth: 1.2 m (3 ft 11 in)

Ramsar Wetland
- Official name: Hyo-ko
- Designated: 30 October 2008
- Reference no.: 1842

Map

Lake Hyōko (瓢湖) is a 281-hectare (690-acre) reservoir area in the city of Agano, Niigata, Japan.

The reservoir was created in 1639 during the Edo period of Japanese history. It is noted for its abundant and diverse bird life, and is an important overwintering grounds for Whooper swans and Tundra swans. The area received protection from the Japanese government as a wildlife refuge in 2005.

On October 30, 2008, it was registered as a Ramsar site.

== Birds ==
- Whooper swan オオハクチョウ (大白鳥) (October–March)
- Tundra swan コハクチョウ (小白鳥) (October–March)
- Northern pintail オナガガモ (尾長鴨) (October–March)
- Common pochard ホシハジロ (星羽白) (October–March)
- Eastern spot-billed duck カルガモ (軽鴨) (all seasons)

== Plants ==
=== Land ===
- Nelumbo nucifera ハス (蓮) white (July–August)
- Iris アヤメ (菖蒲) blue-purple (May)

=== Aquatic ===
- Trapa natans var. japonica オニビシ (鬼菱)
- Phragmites アシ (葦)
- Manchurian wild rice マコモ (真菰)
