= Maki Station (Niigata) =

Railway station in Niigata, Japan

Maki Station 巻駅
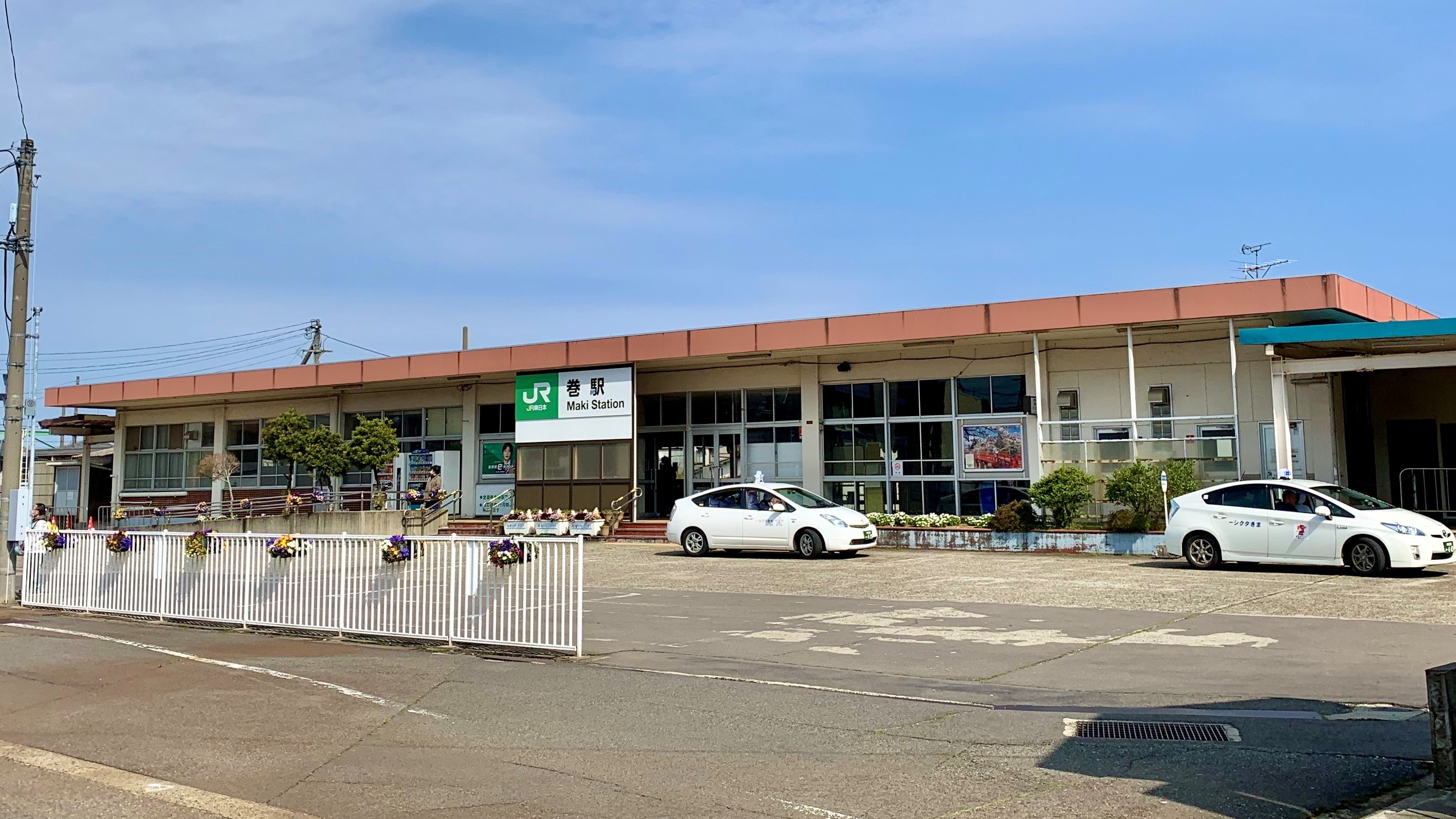
- The west side of Maki Station in March 2020

General information
- Location: Makikō, Nishikan-ku, Niigata-shi, Niigata-ken 953-0041; Japan
- Coordinates: 37.7569°N 138.8894°E
- Operator: JR East
- Line: ■ Echigo Line
- Distance: 57.8 km from Kashiwazaki
- Platforms: 2 side platforms
- Tracks: 2

Other information
- Status: Staffed ("Midori no Madoguchi" )
- Website: Official website

History
- Opened: 25 August 1912

Passengers
- FY2017: 2,394 daily

Services
Preceding station	JR East	Following station
Iwamuro towards Kashiwazaki	Echigo Line	Echigo-Sone towards Niigata
Location
- Location within JR Echigo Line Location within Japan

Maki Station (巻駅, Maki-eki) is a railway station in Nishikan-ku, Niigata, Niigata Prefecture, Japan, operated by East Japan Railway Company (JR East).

== Lines ==
Maki Station is served by the Echigo Line, and is 57.8 kilometers from the starting point of the line at Kashiwazaki Station.

== Layout ==
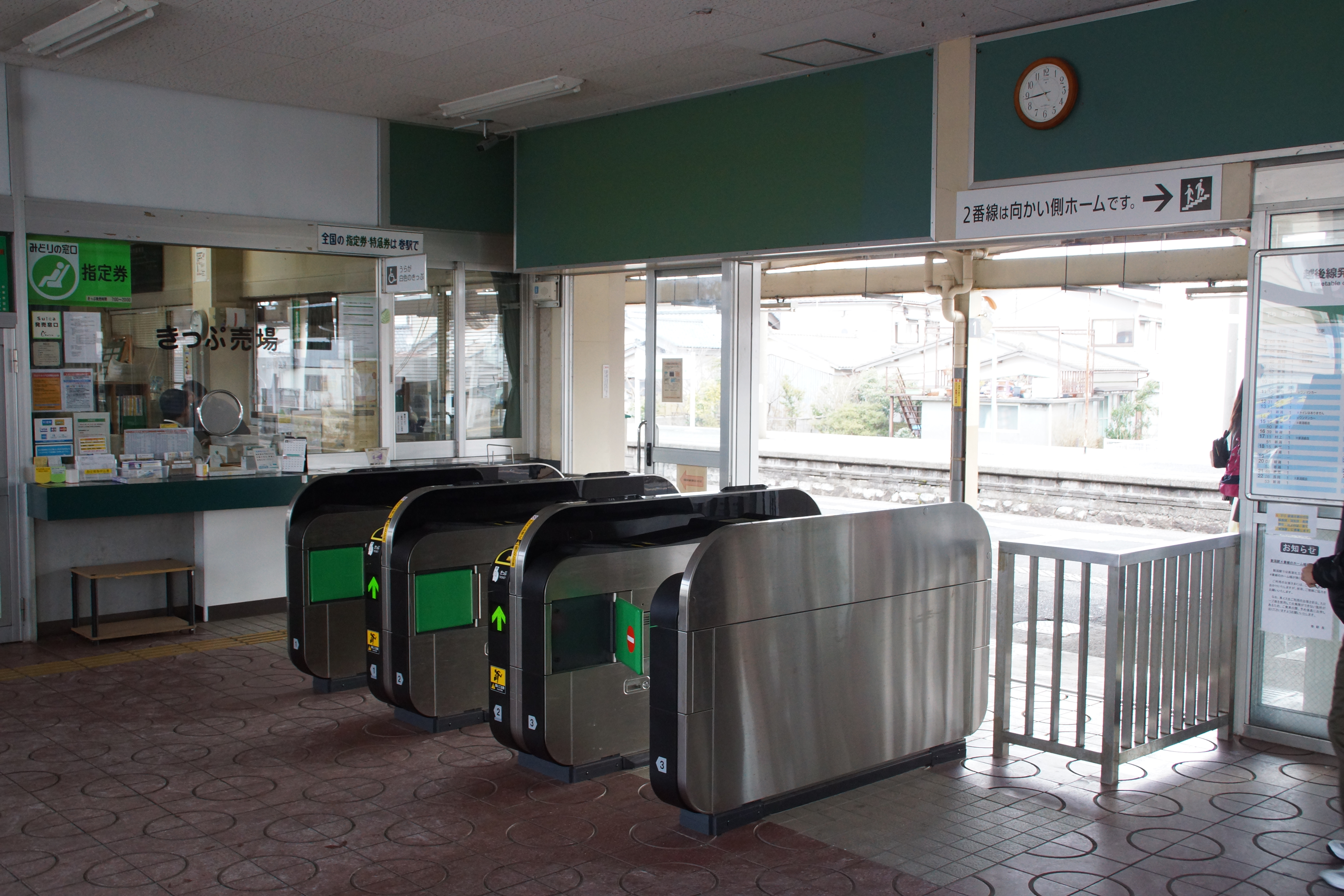
the gate, February 2015

The station consists of two ground-level opposed side platforms connected by a footbridge, serving two tracks.

The station has a "Midori no Madoguchi" staffed ticket office. Suica farecard can be used at this station.

=== Platforms ===
1	■ Echigo Line	for Yoshida and Niigata (bidirectional)
2	■ Echigo Line	for Yoshida

== Passenger statistics ==
In fiscal 2017, the station was used by an average of 2394 passengers daily (boarding passengers only).

== Surrounding area ==
- National Route 460
- Nisihkan-ku Ward Office
- Maki General High School
- Maki High School
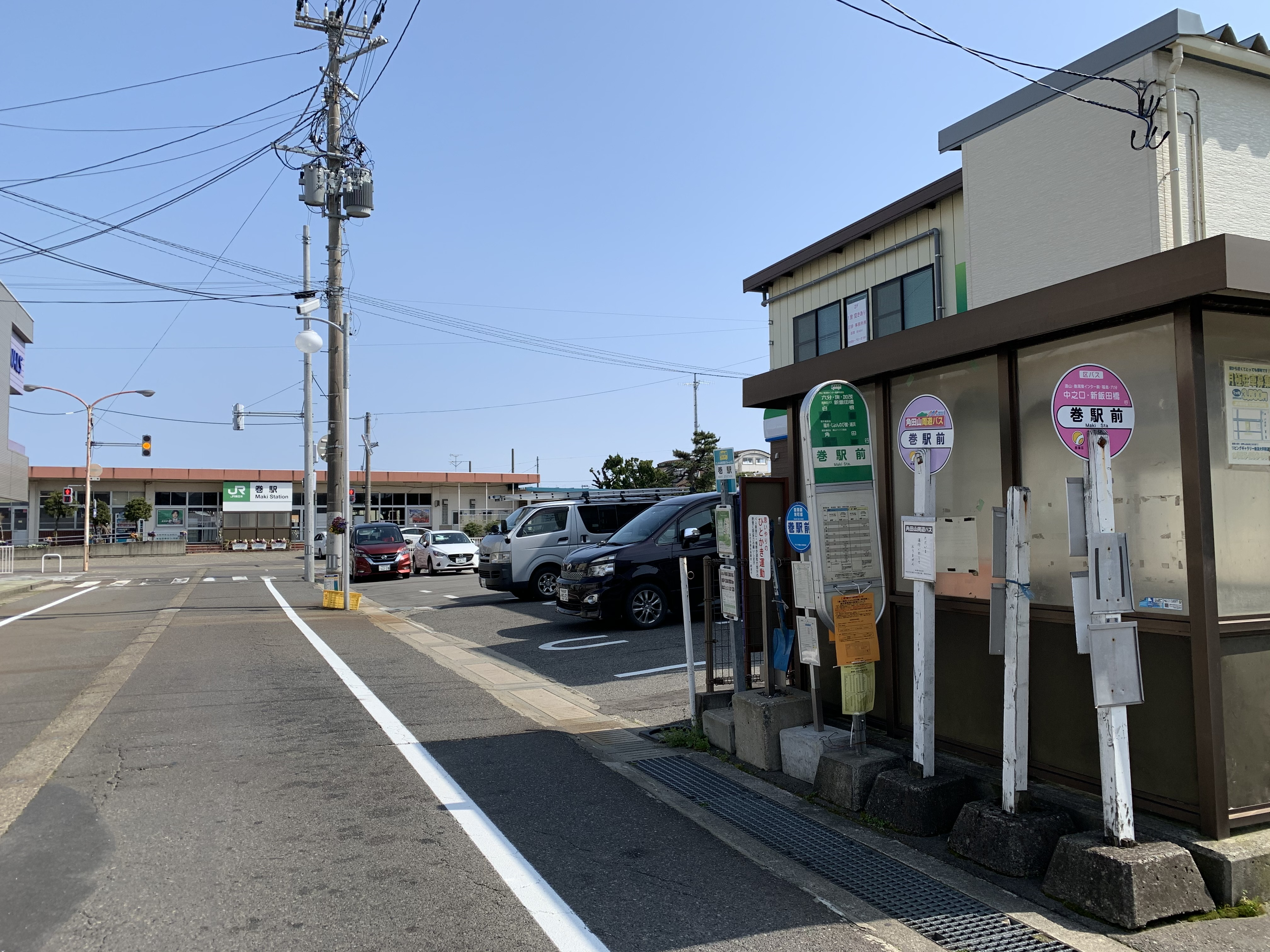
Bus stops in front of Maki Station, March 2020

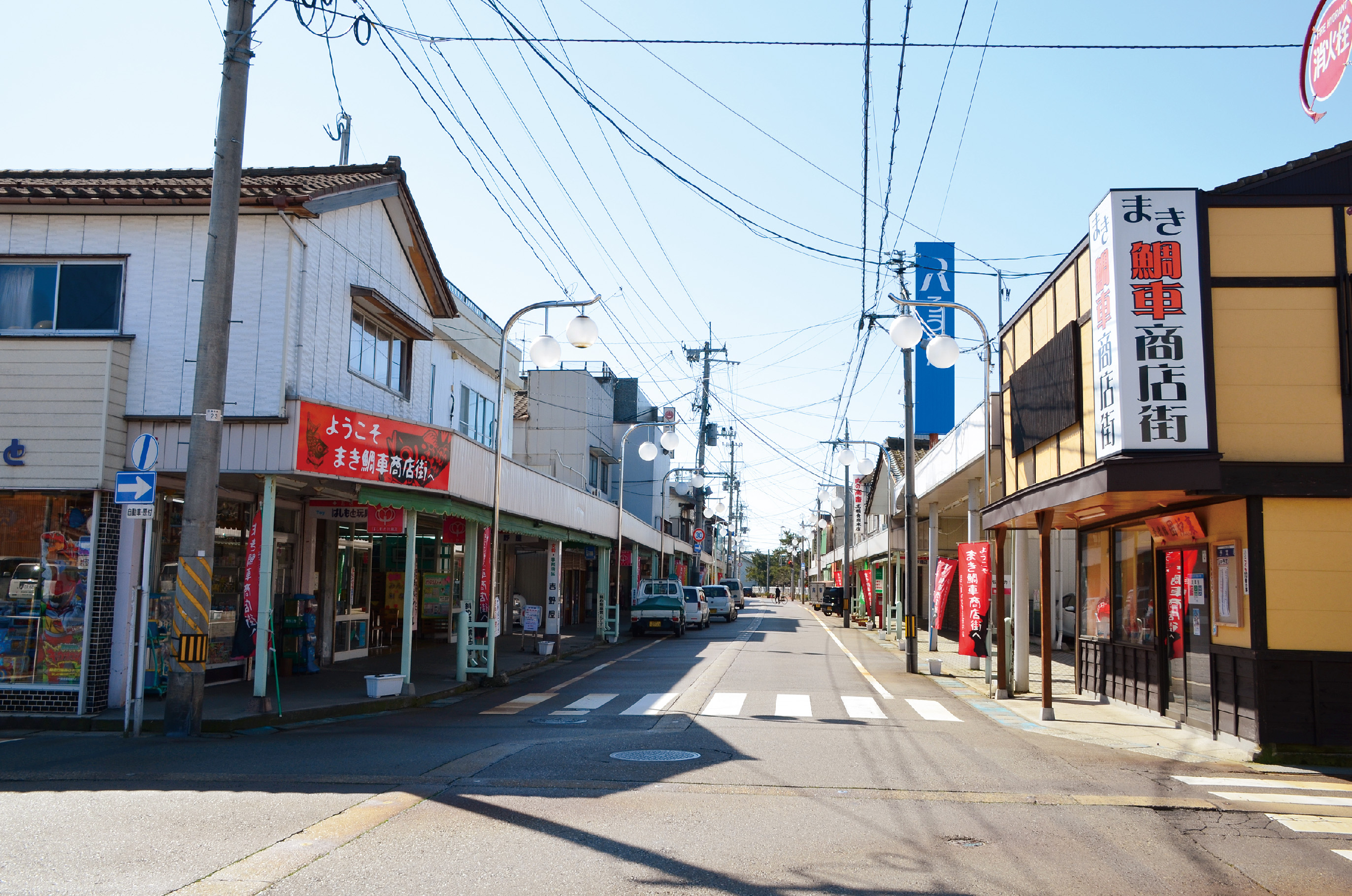
Maki Taiguruma Shopping Street

== See also ==
- List of railway stations in Japan
