= Tsukioka Station =

Tsukioka Station may refer to the following train stations in Japan:

- Tsukioka Station (Niigata) (月岡駅), in Niigata Prefecture
- Tsukioka Station (Toyama) (月岡駅), in Toyama Prefecture
