= Nishi-Shibata Station =

Railway station in Shibata, Niigata Prefecture, Japan

Nishi-Shibata Station 西新発田駅
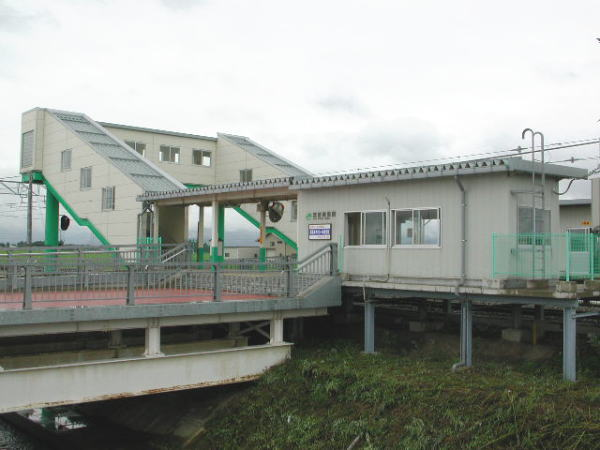
- Nishi-Shibata Station north exit, July 2004

General information
- Location: Mikoshi, Shibata-shi, Niigata-ken 957-0073; Japan
- Coordinates: 37°56′29.2″N 139°18′24.3″E
- Operator: JR East
- Line: ■ Hakushin Line
- Distance: 24.3 km from Niigata
- Platforms: 2 side platforms
- Connections: 2

Other information
- Status: Unstaffed
- Website: Official website

History
- Opened: 1 April 1957

Services
Preceding station	JR East	Following station
Sasaki towards Niigata	Hakushin Line	Shibata Terminus
Location
- Location within JR Hakushin Line Location within Japan

Nishi-Shibata Station (西新発田駅, Nishi-Shibata-eki) is a train station in the city of Shibata, Niigata Prefecture, Japan, operated by East Japan Railway Company (JR East).

== Lines ==
Nishi-Shibata Station is served by the Hakushin Line, and is 24.3 kilometers from the starting point of the line at Niigata Station.

== Layout ==
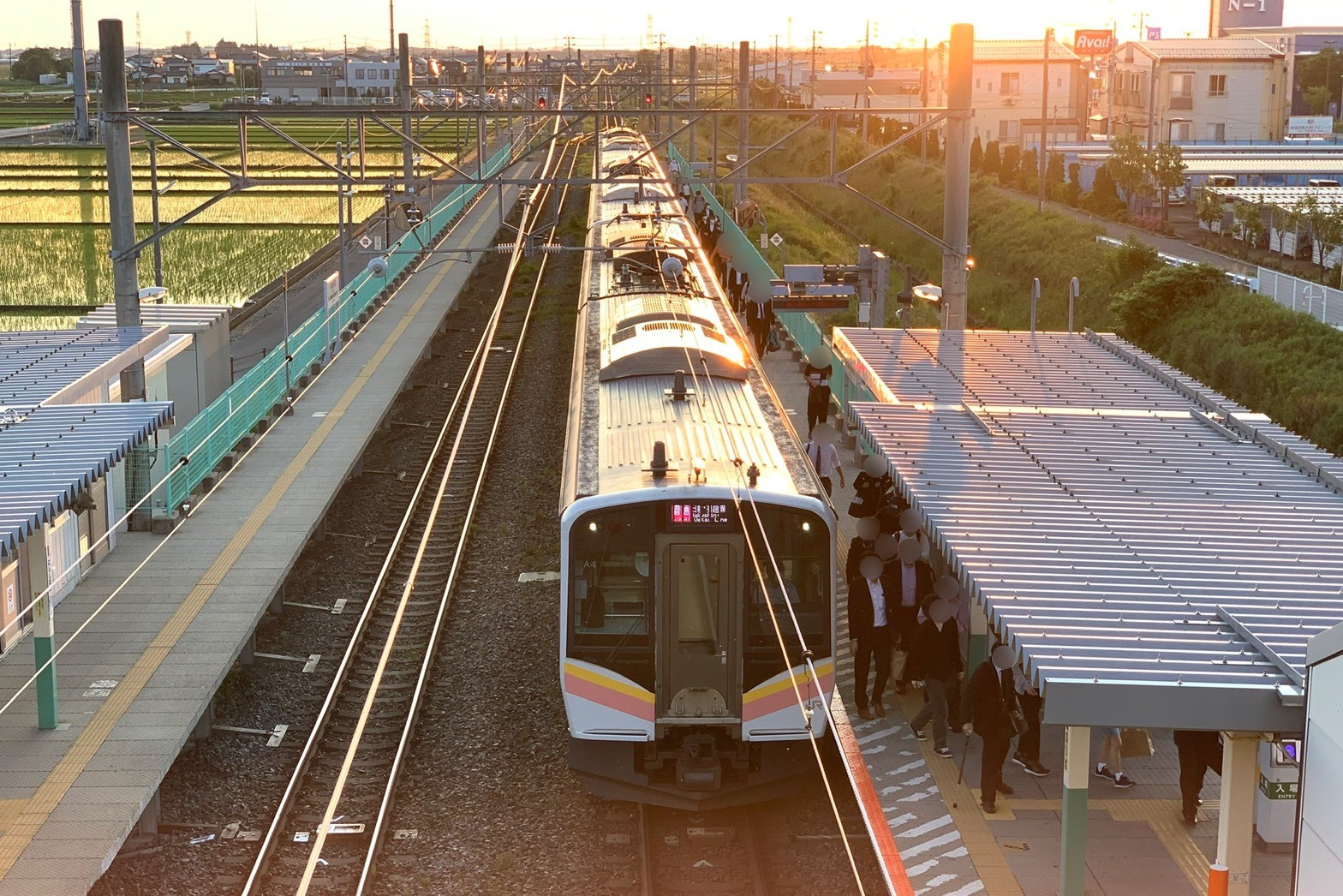
Platforms, May 2020

The station consists of two ground-level opposed side platforms connected by a footbridge, serving two tracks. The station is unattended.

=== Platforms ===
1	■ Hakushin Line	for Shibata and Niigata (bidirectional)
2	■ Hakushin Line	for Shibata and Niigata (bidirectional)

== History ==
The station opened on 11 February 1957. With the privatization of Japanese National Railways (JNR) on 1 April 1987, the station came under the control of JR East. The station was physically relocated 200 meters towards Shibata Station in October 2000.

== Surrounding area ==
- AEON MALL SHIBATA (Shopping mall)
- National Route 460
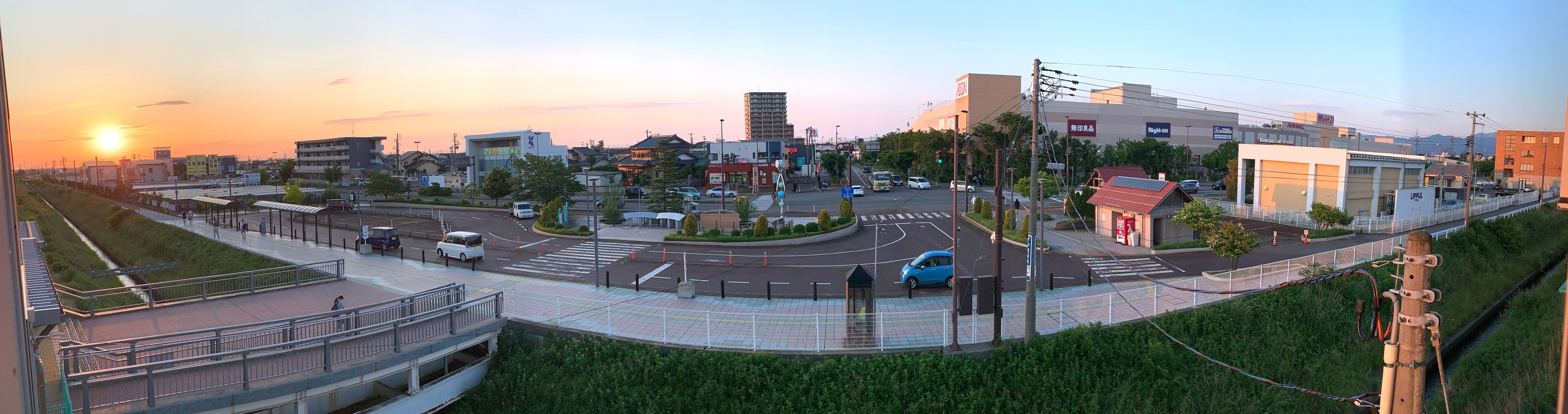
View from the north exit, May 2020

== See also ==
- List of railway stations in Japan
