= Tsukioka Station (Niigata) =

Railway station in Shibata, Niigata Prefecture, Japan

Tsukioka Station 月岡駅
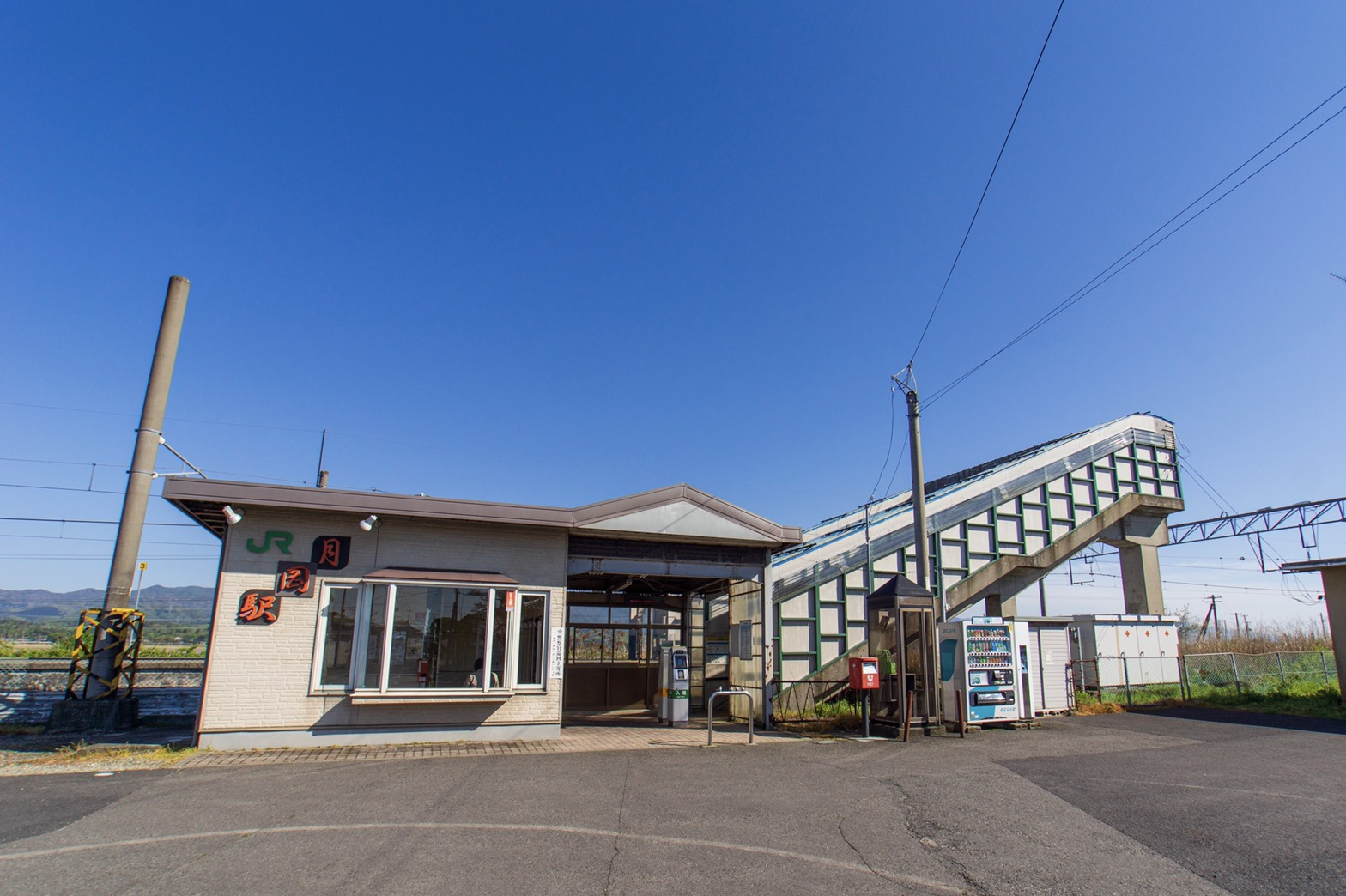
- Tsukioka Station, May 2019

General information
- Location: 1552 Honda, Shibata-shi, Niigata-ken 959-2335; Japan
- Coordinates: 37°53′21.0″N 139°16′18.9″E
- Operator: JR East
- Line: ■ Uetsu Main Line
- Distance: 11.7 km from Niitsu
- Platforms: 1 island platform
- Tracks: 1

Other information
- Status: Unstaffed
- Website: www.jreast.co.jp/estation/station/info.aspx?StationCd=1005

History
- Opened: 2 September 1912
- Former names: Tenno-Sinden Station (to 1950)

Services
Preceding station	JR East	Following station
Kamiyama towards Niitsu	Uetsu Main Line	Nakaura towards Akita
Location
- Location within Japan

Tsukioka Station (月岡駅, Tsukioka eki) is a railway station in the city of Shibata, Niigata, Japan, operated by East Japan Railway Company (JR East).

== Lines ==
Tsukioka Station is served by the Uetsu Main Line, and is 17.8 kilometers from the starting point of the line at Niitsu Station.

== Station layout ==
The station consists of one island platform connected to the station building by a footbridge. However, only one side of the platform is in use, and serves bi-directional traffic. The station is unattended.

=== Platforms ===
1	■ Uetsu Main Line	siding
2	■ Uetsu Main Line	for Niitsu for Shibata

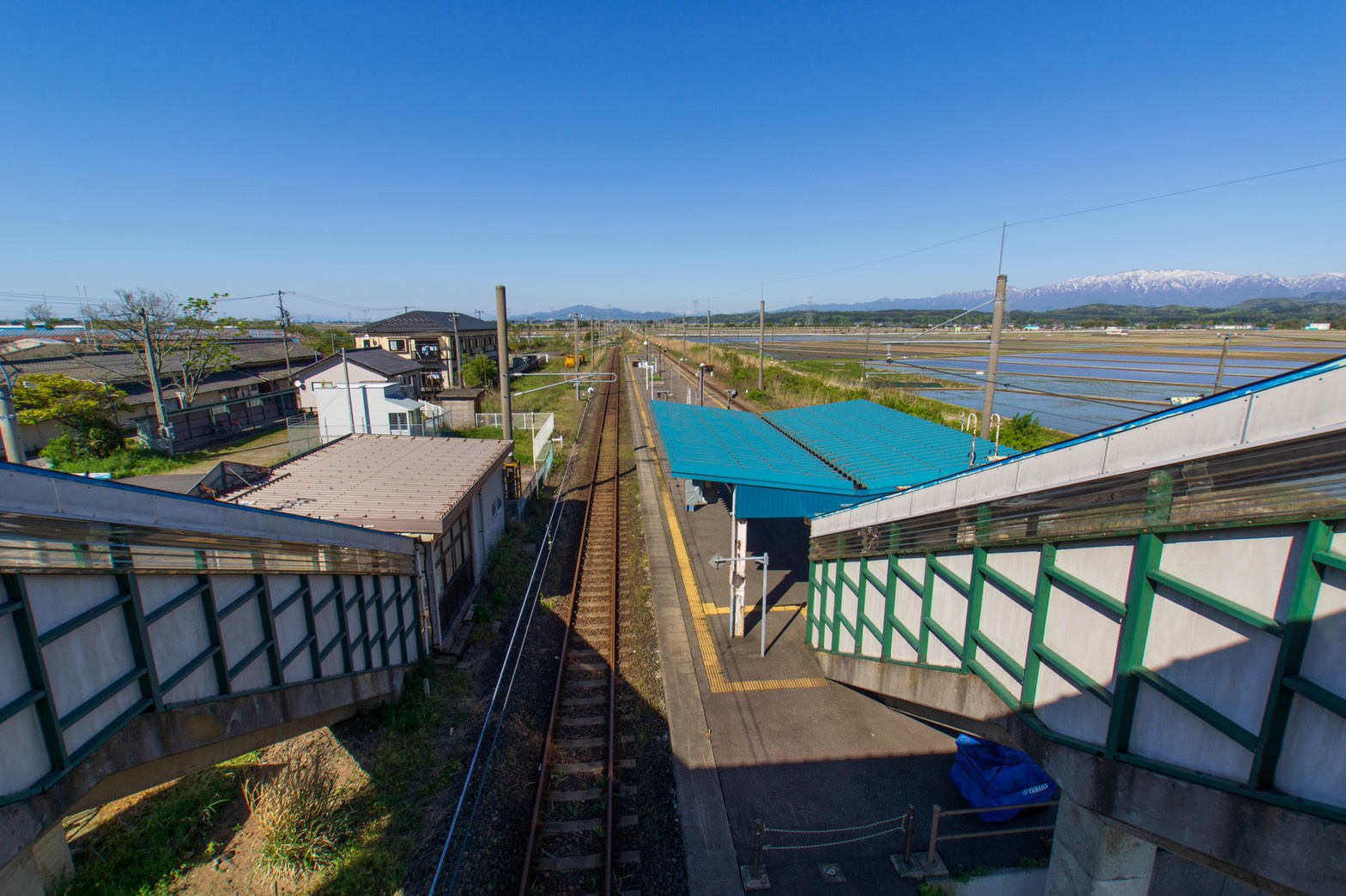
Platforms (May 2019)

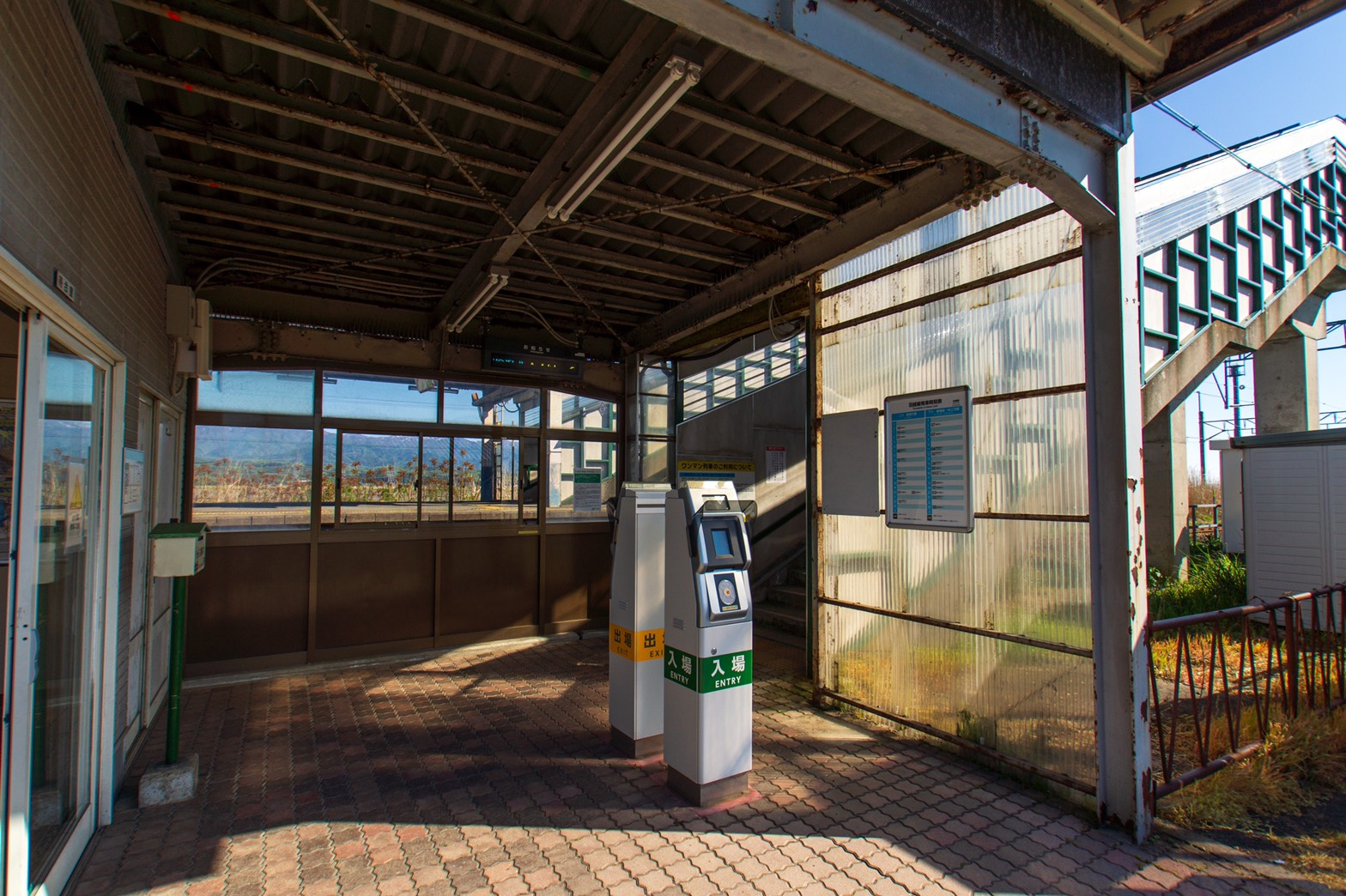
Gate (May 2019)

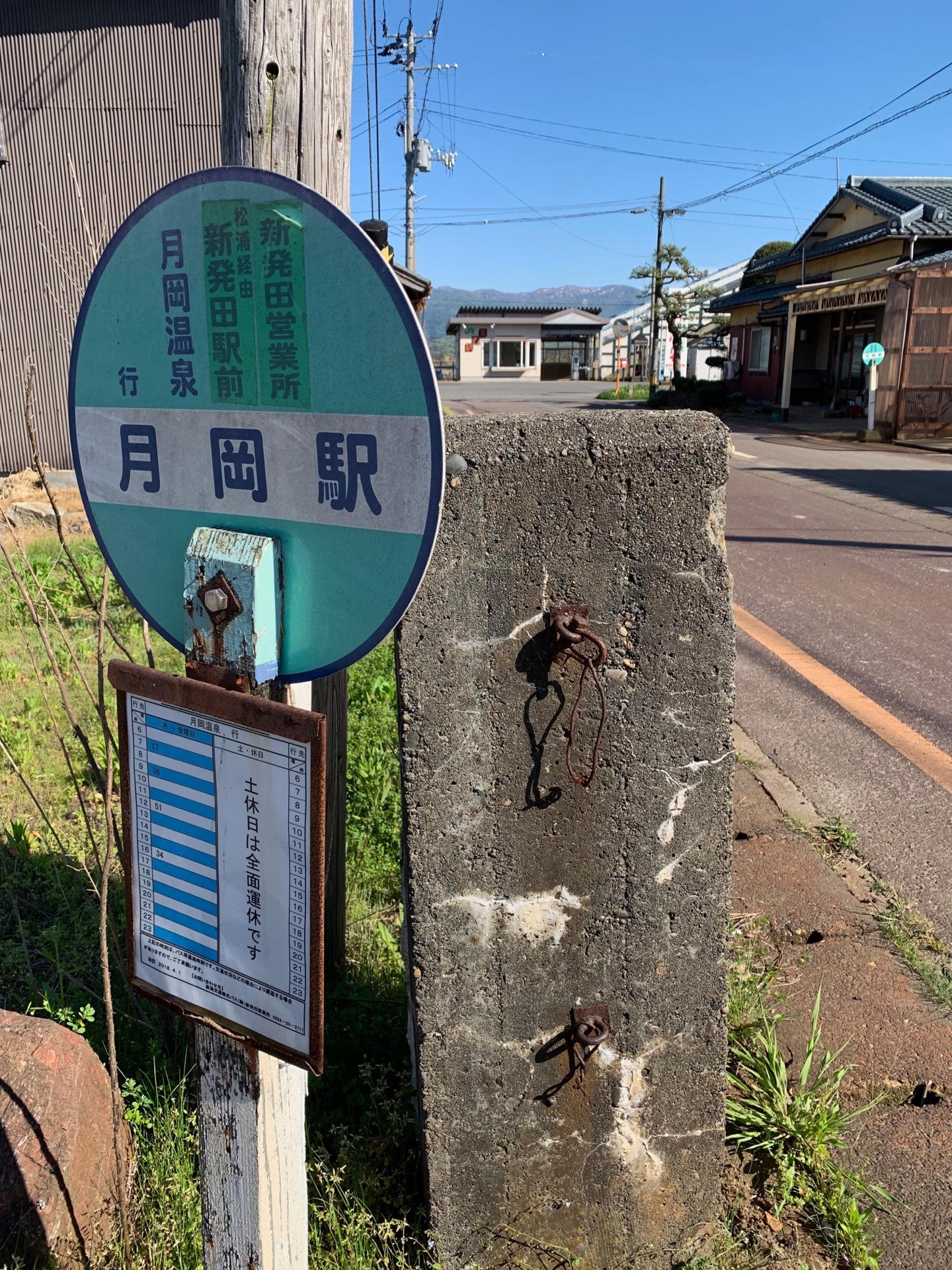
Bus Stop (May 2019)

== History ==
Tsukioka Station opened on 2 September 1912 as Tenno-Shinden Station (天王新田駅). It was renamed to its present name on 1 September 1950. With the privatization of Japanese National Railways (JNR) on 1 April 1987, the station came under the control of JR East.

== Surrounding area ==
- National Route 460
- Tsukioka Onsen

== See also ==
- List of railway stations in Japan
