= Nakaura Station =

Railway station in Shibata, Niigata Prefecture, Japan

Nakaura Station 中浦駅
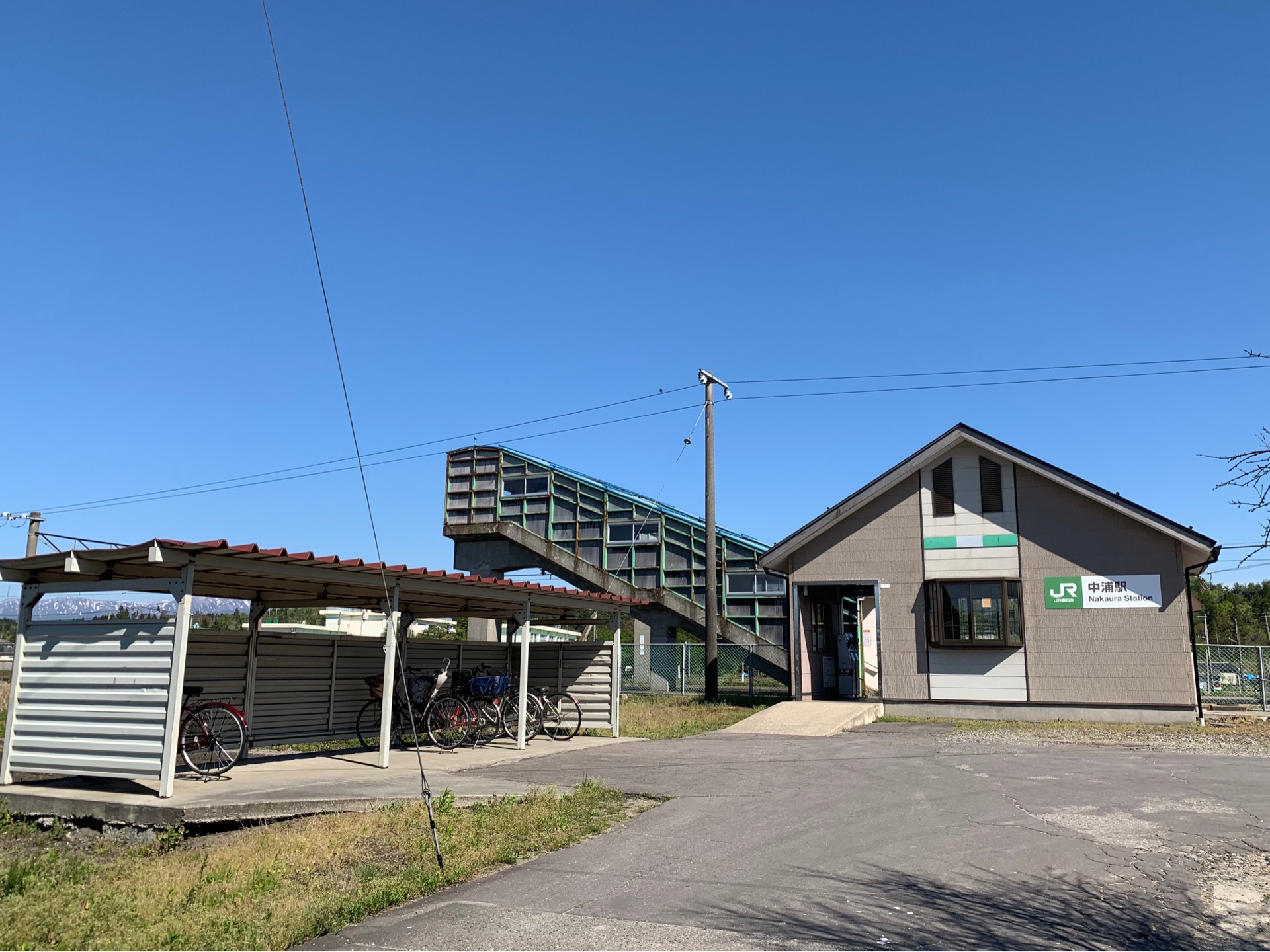
- Nakaura Station, May 2019

General information
- Location: 151 Shimoiizuka, Shibata-shi, Niigata-ken 959-2331; Japan
- Coordinates: 37°54′43.9″N 139°18′9.3″E
- Operator: JR East
- Line: ■ Uetsu Main Line
- Distance: 21.5 km from Niitsu
- Platforms: 1 side platform
- Tracks: 1

Other information
- Status: Unstaffed
- Website: Official website

History
- Opened: 1 July 1953

Services
Preceding station	JR East	Following station
Tsukioka towards Niitsu	Uetsu Main Line	Shibata towards Akita
Location
- Location within Japan

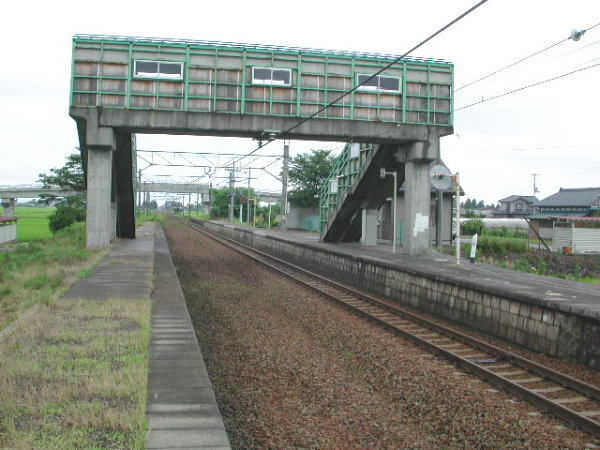
platforms of Nakaura Station

Nakaura Station (中浦駅, Nakaura eki) is a railway station in the city of Shibata, Niigata, Japan, operated by East Japan Railway Company (JR East).

== Lines ==
Nakaura Station is served by the Uetsu Main Line, and is 21.5 kilometers from the starting point of the line at Niitsu Station.

== Station layout ==
The station consists of one side platform serving a single bi-directional track. The station formerly had two opposed side platforms connected to the station building by a footbridge. The second platform and footbridge still exist, but the track has been removed. The station is unattended.

== History ==
Nakaura Station opened on 1 July 1953. With the privatization of Japanese National Railways (JNR) on 1 April 1987, the station came under the control of JR East.

== Surrounding area ==
- National Route 460

== See also ==
- List of railway stations in Japan
