= Shibata, Niigata =

Shibata 新発田市
- City
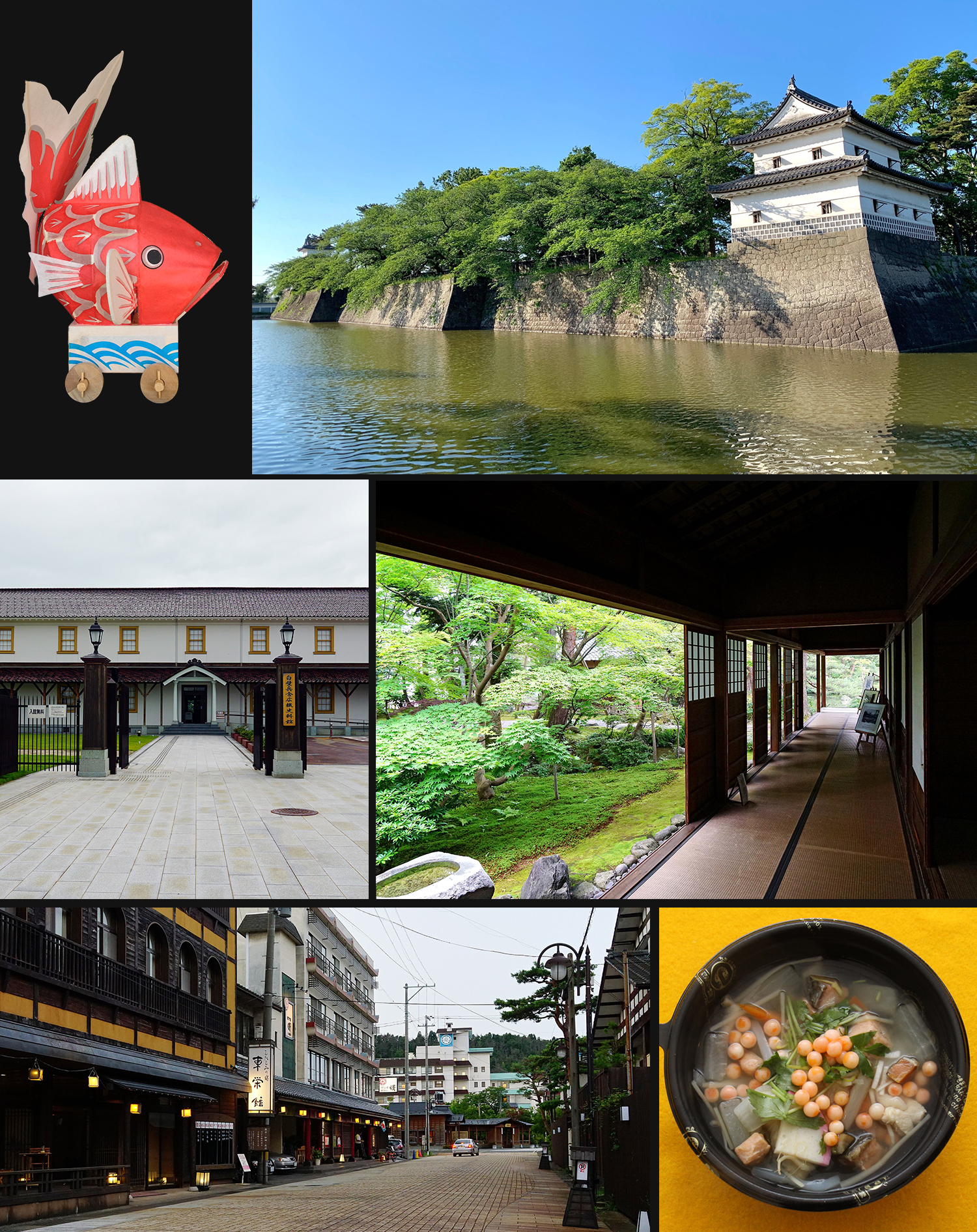
- Clockwise from top: Shibata Castle, Shimizuen garden, Zoni, Tsukiokaonsen, JGSDF Camp Shibata, Kingyo Daiwa

- Flag Seal

- Location of Shibata in Niigata Prefecture

- Coordinates: 37°56′52.5″N 139°19′38.2″E
- Country: Japan
- Region: Chūbu (Kōshin'etsu) (Hokuriku)
- Prefecture: Niigata

Area
  - Total: 533.10 km^{2} (205.83 sq mi)

Population (December 31, 2020)
  - Total: 96,236
  - Density: 180.52/km^{2} (467.55/sq mi)
- Time zone: UTC+9 (Japan Standard Time)
- Symbols
  - Tree: Sakura
  - Flower: Iris
- Phone number: 0254-22-3030
- Address: 3-3-3 Chūōchō, Shibata-shi, Niigata-ken 957-8686
- Website: Official website

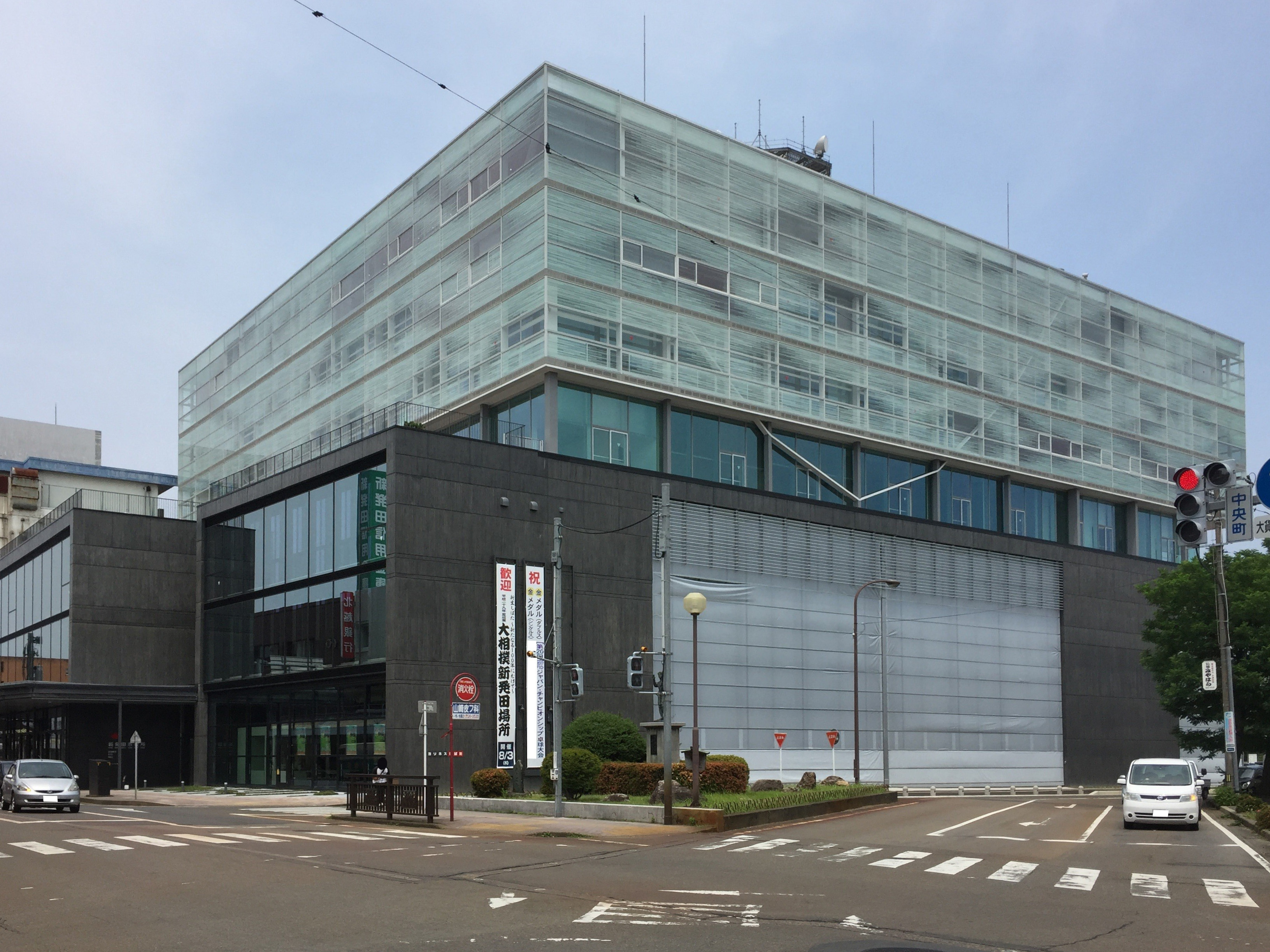
Shibata City Hall

Shibata (新発田市, Shibata-shi) is a city in Niigata Prefecture, Japan. As of 31 December 2020, the city had an estimated population of 96,236 in 37,017 households, and a population density of 179 persons per km². The total area of the city was 533.10 square kilometres (205.83 sq mi).

== Geography ==
Shibata is located in a mostly inland region of north-central Niigata Prefecture on the northern end of the Echigo Plain, with a small shoreline of the Sea of Japan.

=== Surrounding municipalities ===
- Fukushima Prefecture
  - Kitakata
- Niigata Prefecture
  - Aga
  - Agano
  - Kita-ku, Niigata
  - Seirō
  - Tainai
- Yamagata Prefecture
  - Oguni

=== Climate ===
Shibata has a humid subtropical climate (Köppen Cfa) characterized by warm, wet summers and cold winters with heavy snowfall. The average annual temperature in Shibata is 13.0 °C. The average annual rainfall is 1920 mm with September as the wettest month. The temperatures are highest on average in August, at around 26.2 °C, and lowest in January, at around 1.2 °C.

== Demographics ==
Per Japanese census data, the population of Shibata peaked around the year 2000 and has been in decline since then.

Historical population
Year	Pop.	±%
1960	103,738	—
1970	101,245	−2.4%
1980	102,134	+0.9%
1990	104,499	+2.3%
2000	106,016	+1.5%
2010	101,202	−4.5%
2020	94,927	−6.2%

== History ==
The area of present-day Shibata was part of ancient Echigo Province. The area developed as a castle town for Shibata Domain under the Tokugawa shogunate during the Edo period. After the Meiji restoration, the area was organized into Kitakanbara District, Niigata. The town of Shibata was established on April 1, 1889 with the creation of the modern municipalities system. It was elevated to city status on January 1, 1947. On July 7, 2003 the town of Toyoura (from Kitakanbara District) was merged into Shibata. Likewise, on May 1, 2005 the town of Shiunji, and the village of Kajikawa (both from Kitakanbara District) were merged into Shibata.

== Government ==
Shibata has a mayor-council form of government with a directly elected mayor and a unicameral city legislature of 27 members. Shibata, together with the town of Seirō, collectively contributes three members to the Niigata Prefectural Assembly. In terms of national politics, the city is part of Niigata 3rd district of the lower house of the Diet of Japan.

== Economy ==
The economy of Shibata is dominated by the agricultural sector, with rice as the primary crop. Industries include sake brewing and plastics components production.

== Education ==
Shibata has 19 public elementary schools and 10 public junior high schools operated by the city government. The city has seven public high schools operated by the Niigata Prefectural Board of Education, and the prefecture also operates one special education school for the handicapped. Keiwa College is also located in Shibata.

== Transportation ==
=== Railway ===
JR East - Uetsu Main Line

- Tsukioka - Nakaura - Shibata - Kaji - Kanazuka

JR East - Hakushin Line

- Sasaki - Nishi-Shibata - Shibata

=== Highway ===
- Nihonkai-Tōhoku Expressway
- National Route 7
- National Route 113
- National Route 290
- National Route 460

== Sister cities ==
- Uijeongbu, Gyeonggi Province, South Korea, friendship city
- St. James, Missouri, United States
- Orange City, Iowa, United States

== Local attractions ==
Aerial video of Fujitsuka-hama Beach, Shibata in summer

- Ijimino Park (五十公野公園, Ijimino kōen).
- Shibata Castle (新発田城, Shibata-jō) is the main visitor attraction and provides the backdrop to spring cherry blossom viewing parties.
- Shimizuen (清水園) Garden
- Tsukioka Onsen (月岡温泉) hot springs
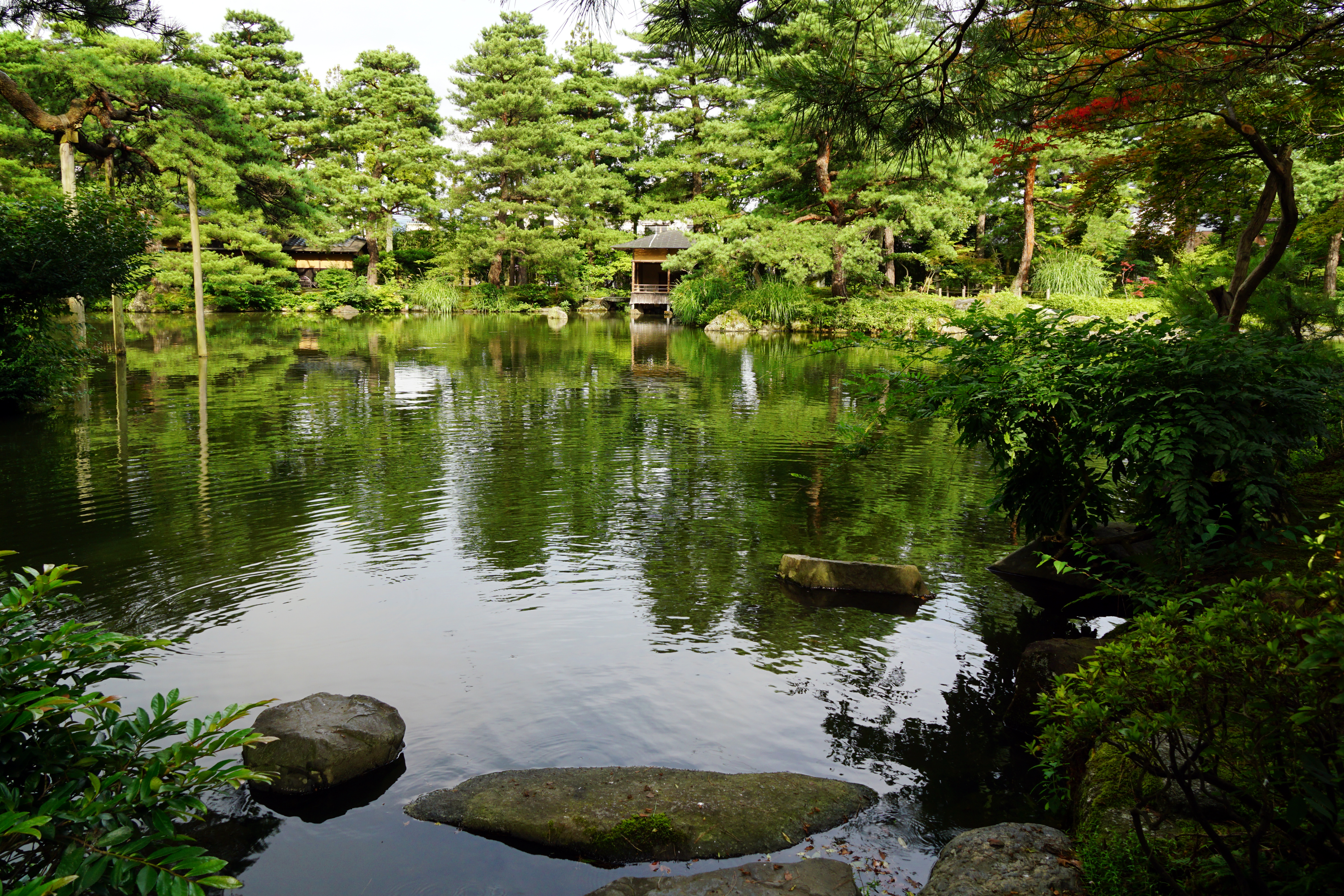
Shimizuen garden

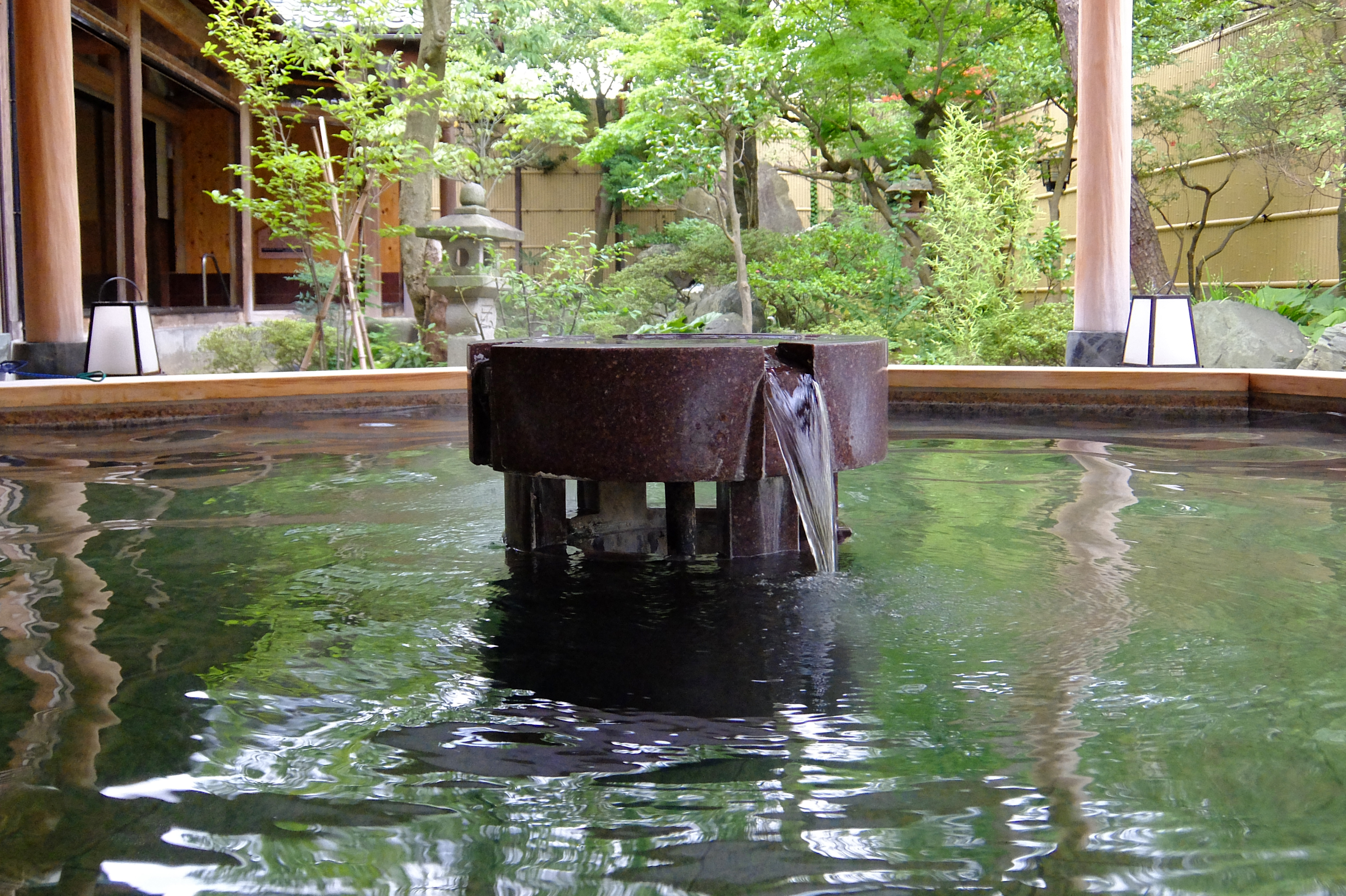
Tsukioka Onsen
