= Keiwa College =

Higher education institution in Niigata Prefecture, Japan

- 敬和学園大学
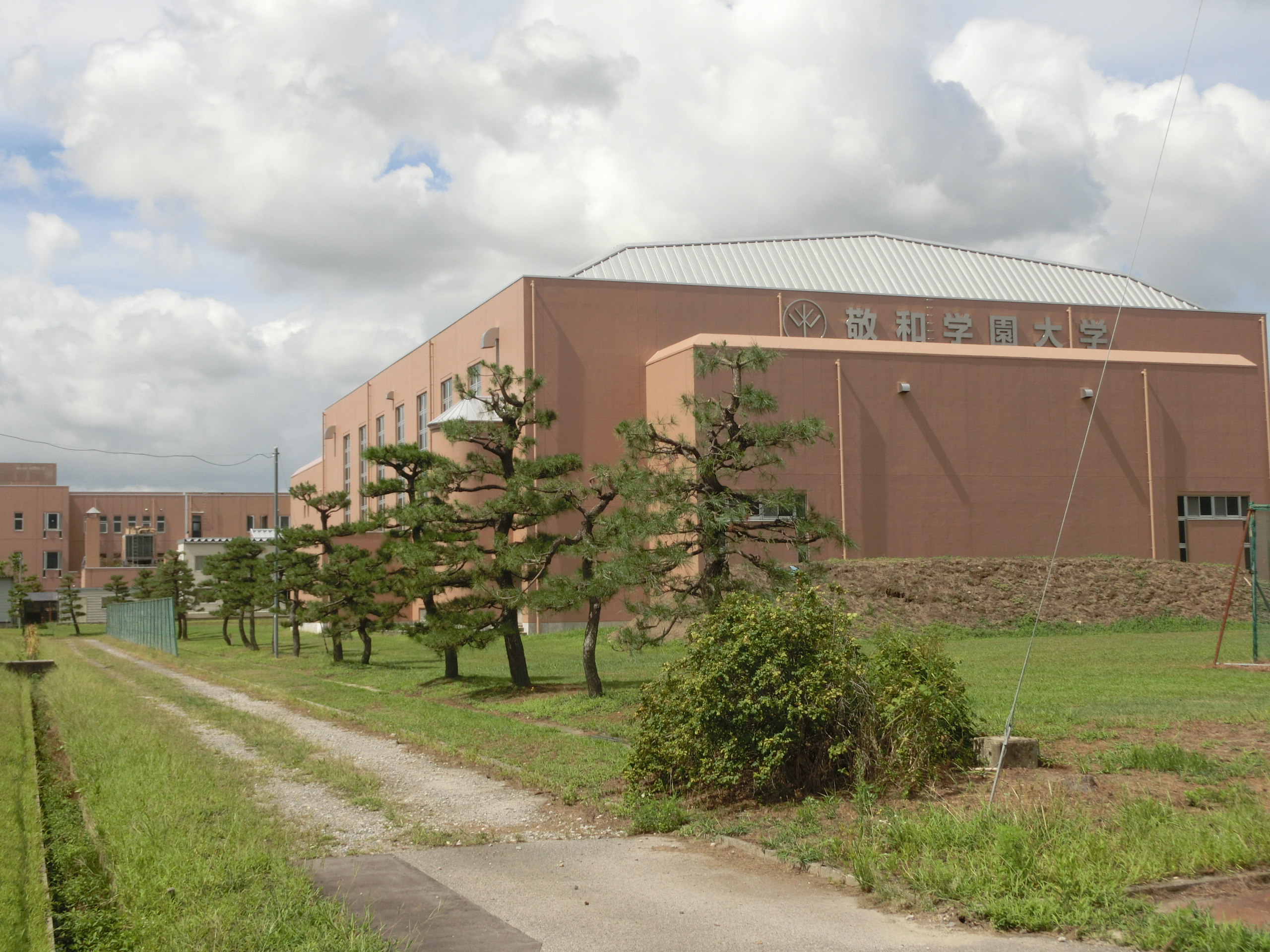
- Type: Private university
- Established: 1991
- Location: Shibata, Niigata, Japan; 37°57′22.5″N 139°17′32.1″E
- Website: www.keiwa-c.ac.jp

Keiwa College (敬和学園大学, Keiwa gakuen daigaku) is a private university in Shibata, Niigata, Japan. The predecessor of the school was founded in 1967. It opened as a college in 1991.
