= Echigo-Sone Station =

Railway station in Niigata, Japan

Echigo-Sone Station 越後曽根駅
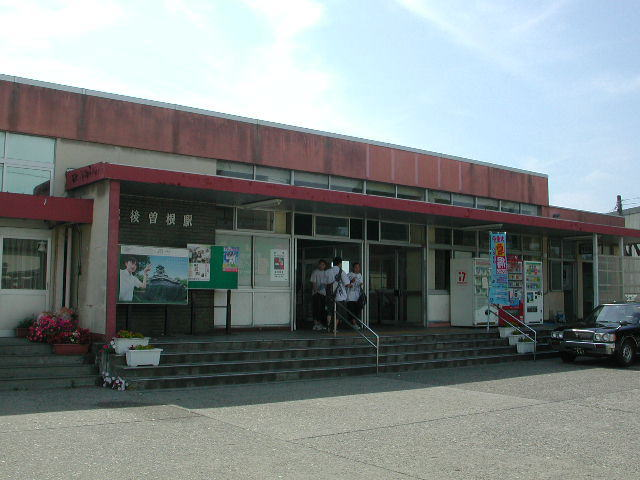
- East side of the station, July 2004

General information
- Location: Kawasaki, Nishikan-ku, Niigata-shi, Niigata-ken 959-0432; Japan
- Coordinates: 37.7937°N 138.9109°E
- Operator: JR East
- Line: ■Echigo Line
- Distance: 62.4 km from Kashiwazaki
- Platforms: 2 side platforms
- Tracks: 2

Other information
- Status: Staffed ( "Midori no Madoguchi" )
- Website: Official website

History
- Opened: 25 August 1912

Passengers
- FY2017: 910 daily

Services
Preceding station	JR East	Following station
Maki towards Kashiwazaki	Echigo Line	Echigo-Akatsuka towards Niigata
Location
- Location within JR Echigo Line Location within Japan

Echigo-Sone Station (越後曽根駅, Echigo-Sone-eki) is a train station in Nishikan-ku, Niigata, Niigata Prefecture, Japan, operated by East Japan Railway Company (JR East).

== Lines ==
Echigo-Sone Station is served by the Echigo Line, and is 62.4 kilometers from the starting point of the line at Kashiwazaki Station.

== Layout ==
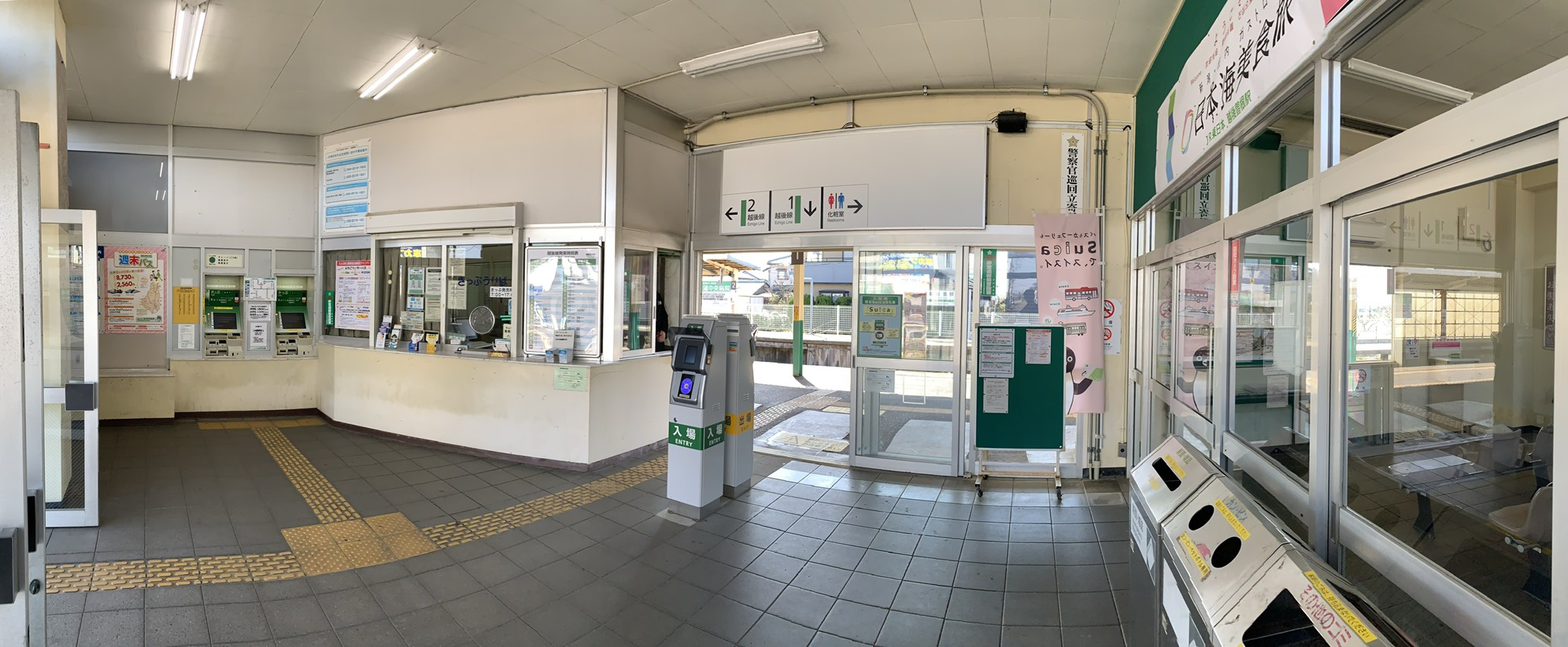
Station interior, March 2019

The station consists of two ground-level opposed side platforms connected by a footbridge, serving two tracks.

The station has a "Midori no Madoguchi" staffed ticket office. Suica farecard can be used at this station.

=== Platforms ===
1	■ Echigo Line	for Yoshida and Niigata (bidirectional)
2	■ Echigo Line	for Yoshida and Niigata (bidirectional)

== History ==
The station opened on 25 August 1912 as Sone Station (曽根駅). It was renamed to its present name on 20 April 1913. With the privatization of Japanese National Railways (JNR) on 1 April 1987, the station came under the control of JR East.

== Passenger statistics ==
In fiscal 2017, the station was used by an average of 910 passengers daily (boarding passengers only).

== Surrounding area ==
- Nishikawa Post Office
- Sone Elementary School
- Nishikawa Middle School

== See also ==
- List of railway stations in Japan
