= Kaji Station =

Railway station in Shibata, Niigata Prefecture, Japan

Kaji Station 加治駅
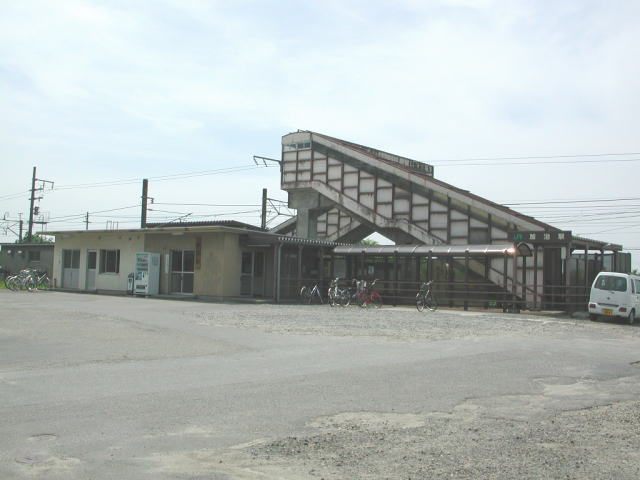
- Kaji Station, August 2004

General information
- Location: 165 Shimonaka, Shibata-shi, Niigata-ken 959-2451; Japan
- Coordinates: 37°58′37.3″N 139°21′32.5″E
- Operator: JR East
- Line: ■ Uetsu Main Line
- Distance: 30.3 km from Niitsu
- Platforms: 1 island platform
- Tracks: 2

Other information
- Status: Unstaffed
- Website: Official website

History
- Opened: 1 June 1914

Services
Preceding station	JR East	Following station
Shibata towards Niitsu	Uetsu Main Line	Kanazuka towards Akita
Location
- Location within Japan

Kaji Station (加治駅, Kaji eki) is a railway station in the city of Shibata, Niigata, Japan, operated by East Japan Railway Company (JR East).

== Lines ==
Kaji Station is served by the Uetsu Main Line, and is 30.3 kilometers from the starting point of the line at Niitsu Station.

== Station layout ==
The station consists of one island platform connected to the station building by a footbridge. The station is unattended.

=== Platforms ===
1	■ Uetsu Main Line	for Shibata, Niitsu, Niigata
2	■ Uetsu Main Line	for Murakami, Oguni

== History ==
Kaji Station opened on 1 June 1914. With the privatization of Japanese National Railways (JNR) on 1 April 1987, the station came under the control of JR East.

== Surrounding area ==
- Shibata Nanata Junior High School

== See also ==
- List of railway stations in Japan
