= Shibata Station (Niigata) =

Railway station in Shibata, Niigata Prefecture, Japan

Shibata Station 新発田駅
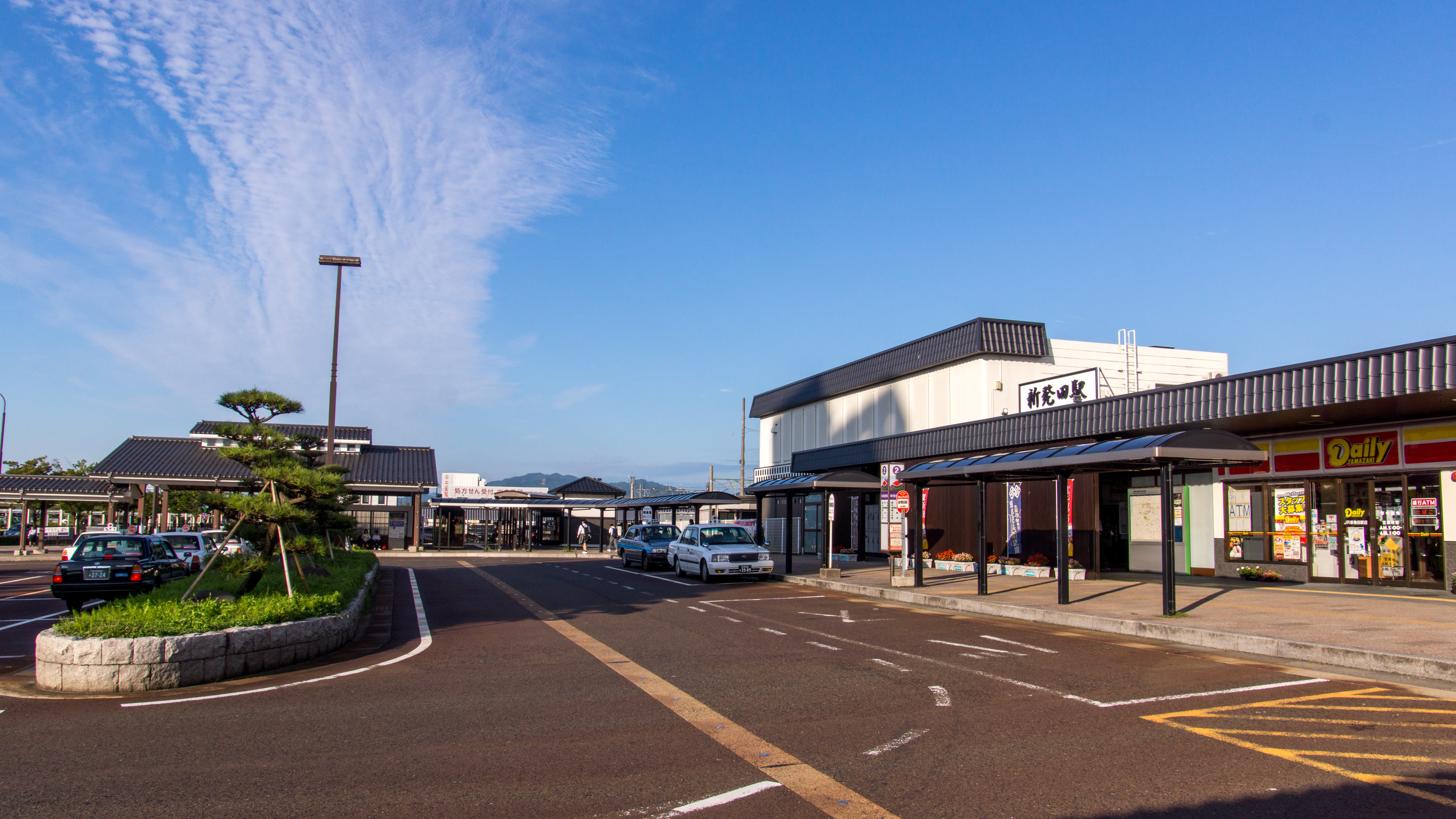
- Shibata Station in September 2017

General information
- Location: 1 Suwa-cho, Shibata-shi, Niigata-ken 957-0055; Japan
- Coordinates: 37°56′38.4″N 139°20′5.3″E
- Operator: JR East
- Lines: ■ Uetsu Main Line; ■ Hakushin Line
- Distance: 26.0 km from Niitsu
- Platforms: 1 side + 1 island platform
- Tracks: 3

Other information
- Status: Staffed (Midori no Madoguchi)
- Website: Official website

History
- Opened: 2 September 1912

Passengers
- FY2017: 3,595 daily

Services
Preceding station	JR East	Following station
Toyosaka towards Niigata	Inaho	Nakajō towards Akita
Nakaura towards Niitsu	Uetsu Main Line	Kaji towards Akita
Nishi-Shibata towards Niigata	Hakushin Line	Terminus
Location
- Location within JR Hakushin Line Location within Japan

Shibata Station (新発田駅, Shibata-eki) is a railway station in the city of Shibata, Niigata, Japan, operated by East Japan Railway Company (JR East).

== Lines ==
Shibata Station is served by the Uetsu Main Line, and is 26.0 kilometers from the terminus of the line at Niitsu Station. It is also served by the Hakushin Line and is 27.3 kilometers from the terminus of the line at Niigata Station.

== Station layout ==
The station consists of one side platform and one island platform connected by an underground passage. The station has a Midori no Madoguchi staffed ticket office.

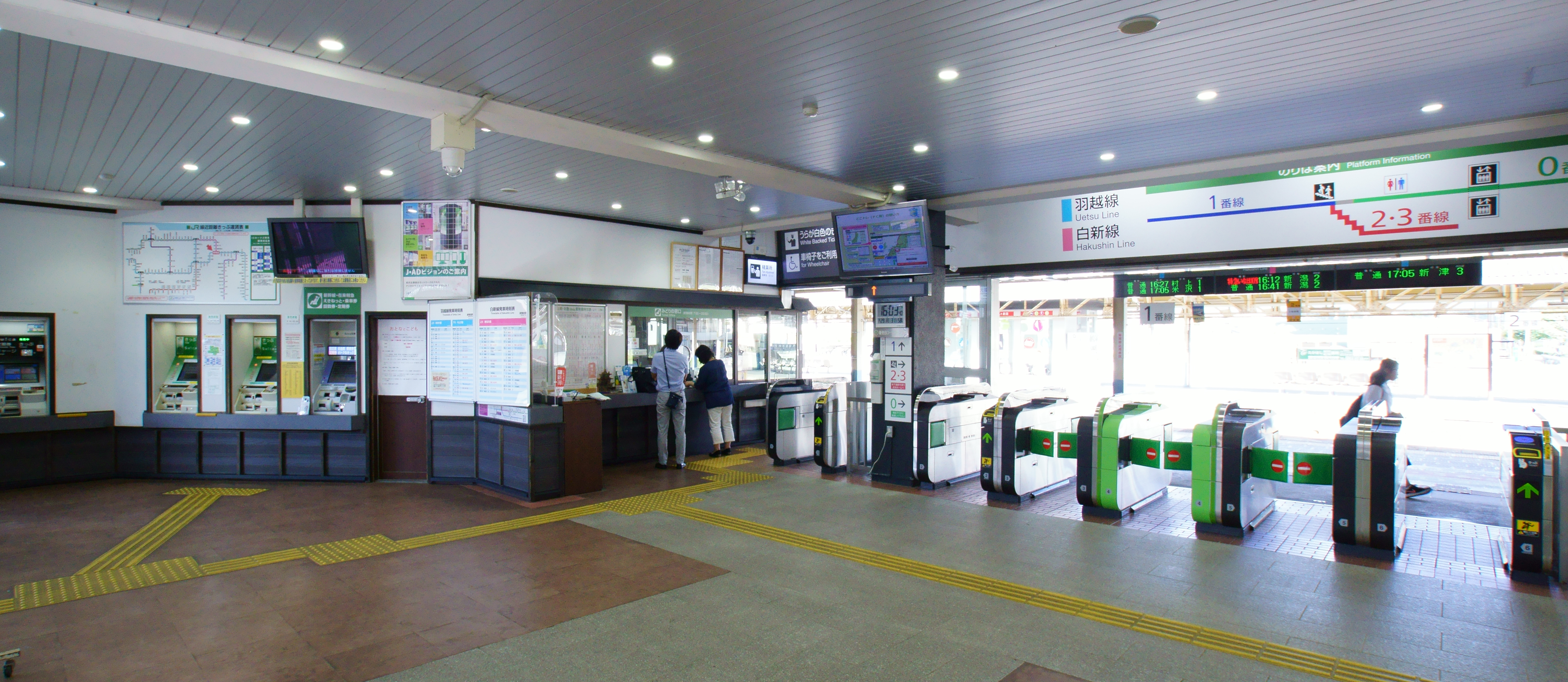
Gate (August 2016)

== Platforms ==
0	■ Hakushin Line	for Toyosaka, and Niigata
1	■ Uetsu Main Line	for Nakajō, Sakata, and Akita
2	■ Hakushin Line	for Toyosaka and Niigata
3	■ Uetsu Main Line	for Suibara and Niitsu

== History ==
The station opened on 2 September 1912. With the privatization of Japanese National Railways (JNR) on 1 April 1987, the station came under the control of JR East.

== Passenger statistics ==
In fiscal 2017, the station was used by an average of 3,595 passengers daily (boarding passengers only).

== Surrounding area ==
- Shibata City Hall
- Shibata Castle
- Shimizuen garden
- National Route 290
- National Route 460

== See also ==
- List of railway stations in Japan
