= Kanazuka Station =

Railway station in Shibata, Niigata Prefecture, Japan

Kanazuka Station 金塚駅
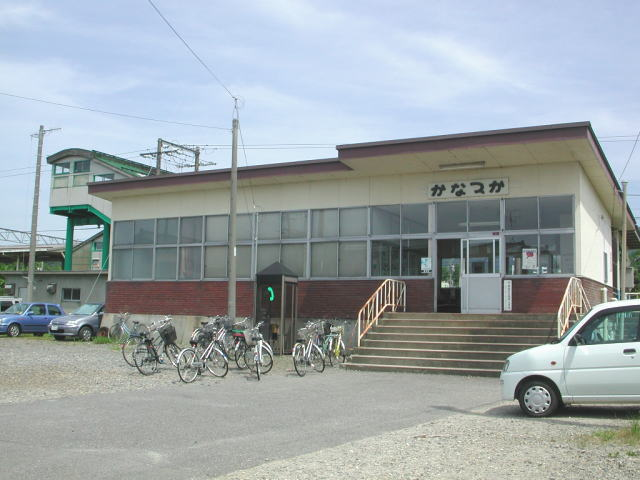
- Kanazuka Station, August 2004

General information
- Location: 366 Shimokonakayama, Shibata-shi, Niigata-ken 959-2477; Japan
- Coordinates: 38°1′10.9″N 139°22′44.5″E
- Operator: JR East
- Line: ■ Uetsu Main Line
- Distance: 35.3 km from Niitsu
- Platforms: 1 side + 1 island platform
- Tracks: 3

Other information
- Status: Unstaffed
- Website: www.jreast.co.jp/estation/station/info.aspx?StationCd=461

History
- Opened: 1 June 1914

Services
Preceding station	JR East	Following station
Kaji towards Niitsu	Uetsu Main Line	Nakajō towards Akita
Location
- Location within Japan

Kanazuka Station (金塚駅, Kanazuka eki) is a railway station in the city of Shibata, Niigata, Japan, operated by East Japan Railway Company (JR East).

== Lines ==
Kanazuka Station is served by the Uetsu Main Line, and is 35.3 kilometers from the starting point of the line at Niitsu Station.

== Station layout ==
The station consists of one side platform and one island platform connected to the station building by a footbridge. The station is unattended.

=== Platforms ===
1	■ Uetsu Main Line	for Murakami, Sakata
2	■ Uetsu Main Line	siding
3	■ Uetsu Main Line	for Niitsu, Niigata

== History ==
Kanazuka Station opened on 1 June 1914 With the privatization of Japanese National Railways (JNR) on 1 April 1987, the station came under the control of JR East.

== Surrounding area ==
- National Route 7
- Kanazuka Post Office

== See also ==
- List of railway stations in Japan
