= Japan National Route 460 =

Road in Niigata prefecture, Japan

National Route 460
- 国道460号
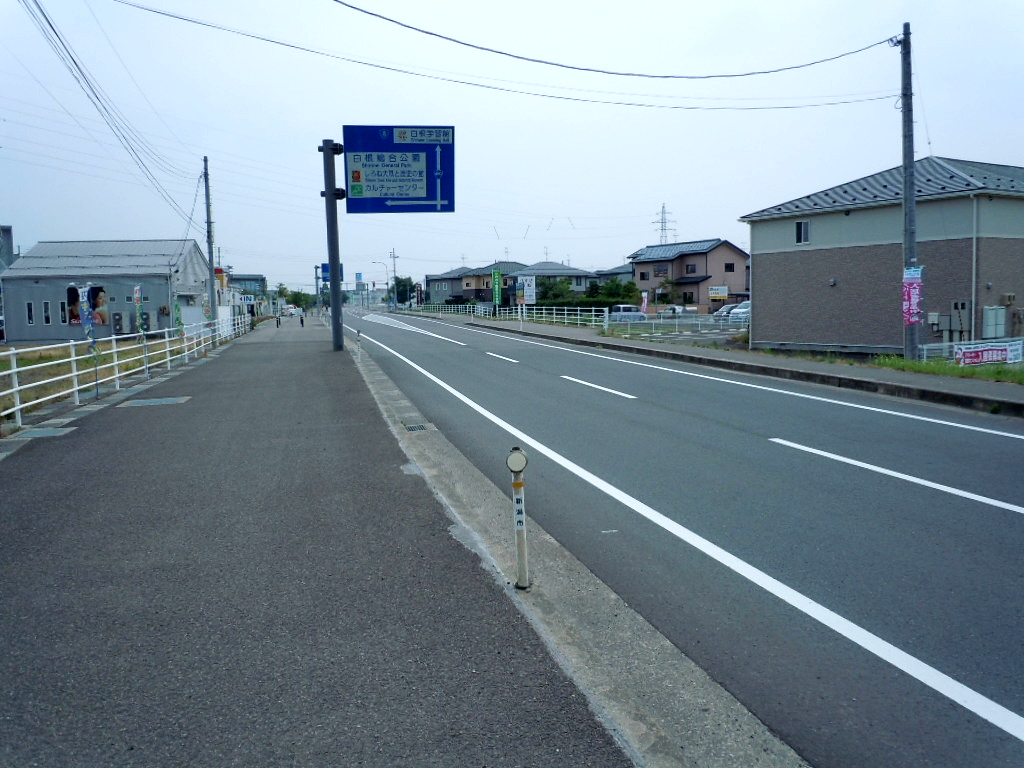

Route information
- Length: 120.5 km (74.9 mi)

Location
- Country: Japan

Highway system
- National highways of Japan; Expressways of Japan
← National Route 459	→ National Route 461

National Route 460 is a national highway of Japan connecting Shibata, Niigata and Kashiwazaki, Niigata in Japan, with a total length of 120.5 km (74.88 mi).
