= Washima, Niigata =

Washima 和島村
- Former municipality
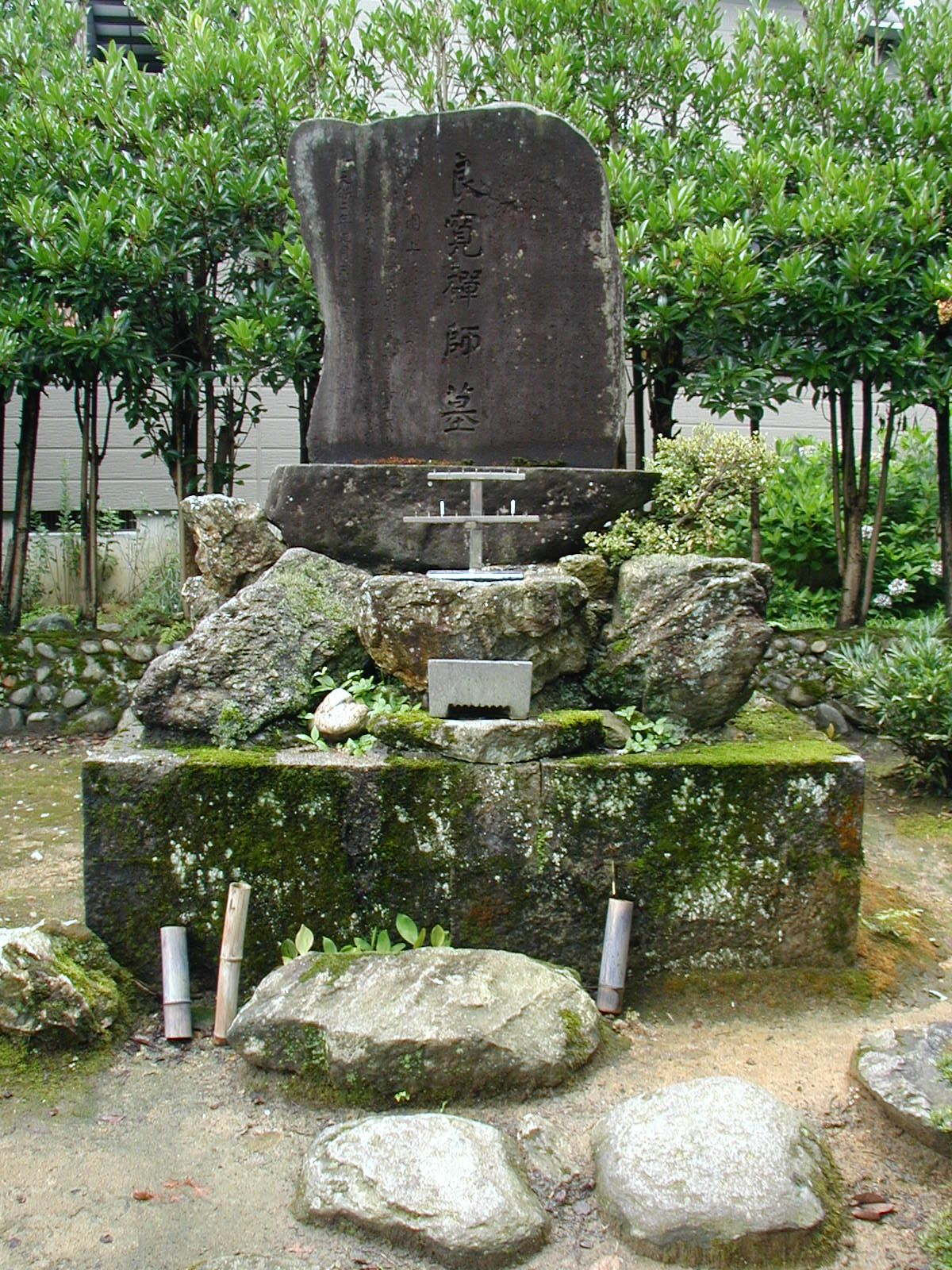
- Ryōkan's grave

- Flag Seal
- Interactive map of Washima
- Country: Japan
- Region: Hokuriku
- Prefecture: Niigata Prefecture
- Merged: January 1, 2006 (now part of Nagaoka)

Area
  - Total: 31.86 km^{2} (12.30 sq mi)

Population (2003)
  - Total: 4,814
- Time zone: UTC+09:00 (JST)

10 municipalities merged into Nagaoka City

Washima (和島村, Washima-mura) is a former village in Santō District, Niigata, Japan.

As of 2003, the village had an estimated population of 4,814 and a population density of 151.10 persons per km^{2}. The total area was 31.86 km^{2}.

On January 1, 2006, Washima, along with the city of Tochio, and the towns of Teradomari and Yoita (all from Santō District), was merged into the expanded city of Nagaoka.

== Transportation ==
=== Railway ===
JR East - Echigo Line

- Myōhōji - Ojimaya

=== Highway ===
- National Route 116
