= Teradomari, Niigata =

Teradomari 寺泊町
- Former municipality
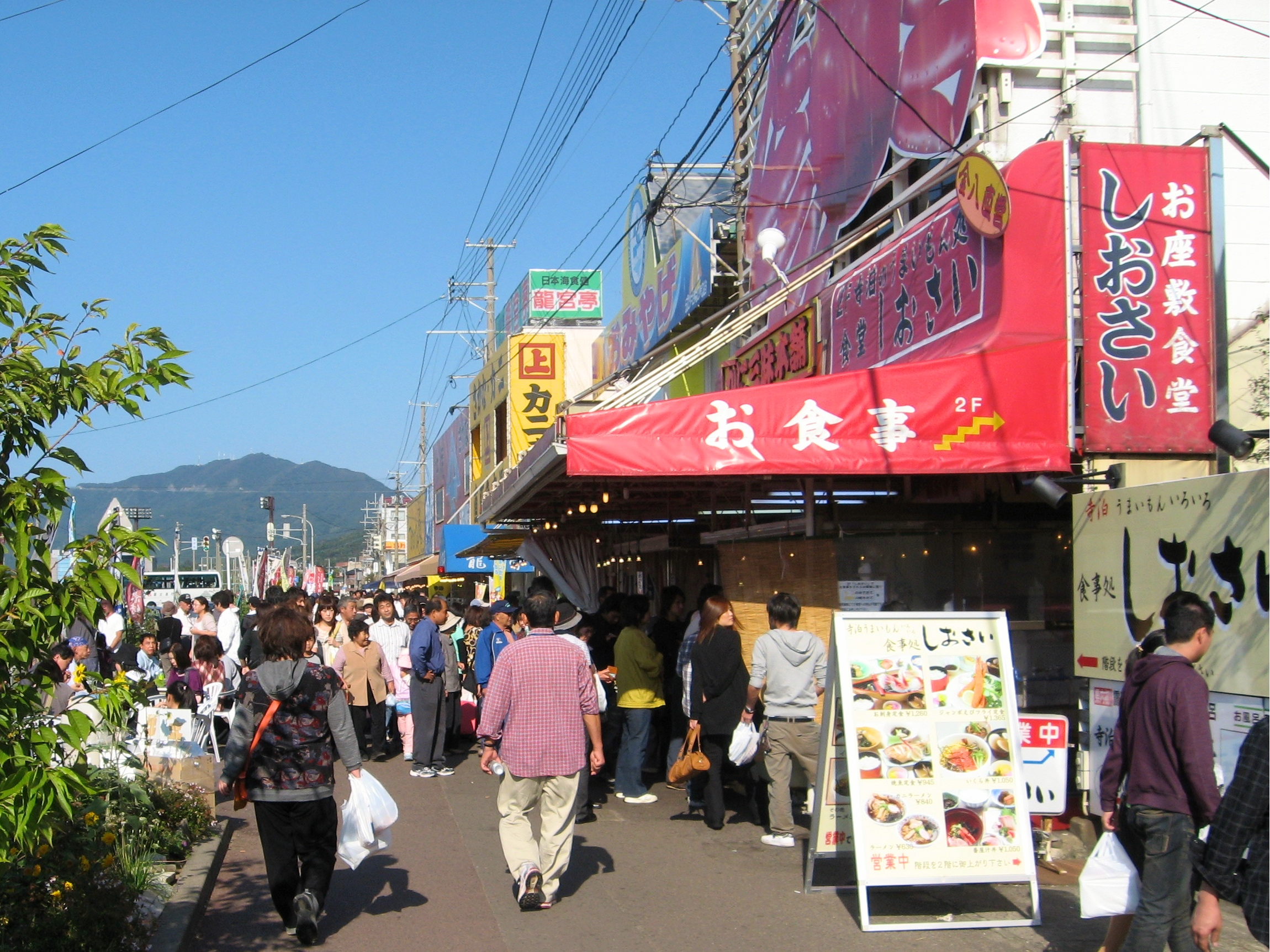
- Teradomari Fish Market Street

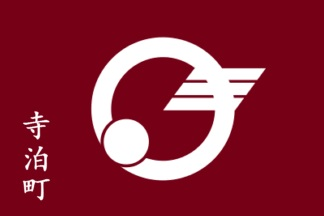
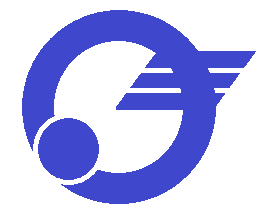
- Flag Seal
- Interactive map of Teradomari
- Country: Japan
- Region: Hokuriku
- Prefecture: Niigata Prefecture
- Merged: January 1, 2006 (now part of Nagaoka)

Area
  - Total: 58.16 km^{2} (22.46 sq mi)

Population (2003)
  - Total: 11,766
- Time zone: UTC+09:00 (JST)

10 municipalities merged into Nagaoka City

Teradomari (寺泊町, Teradomari-machi) was a former town located in Santō District, Niigata Prefecture, Japan.

== Population ==
As of 2003, the town had an estimated population of 11,766 and a density of 202.30 persons per km^{2}. The total area was 58.16 km^{2}.

== History ==
On January 1, 2006, Teradomari lost its independent status as a town when it, along with the city of Tochio, the town of Yoita, and the village of Washima (all from Santō District), was merged into the expanded city of Nagaoka.

== Climate ==
Climate data for Teradomari, Niigata (2001–2020, extremes 2001–present)
Month	Jan	Feb	Mar	Apr	May	Jun	Jul	Aug	Sep	Oct	Nov	Dec	Year
Record high °C (°F)	14.6 (58.3)	21.7 (71.1)	26.1 (79.0)	26.8 (80.2)	31.2 (88.2)	34.1 (93.4)	39.4 (102.9)	40.6 (105.1)	38.0 (100.4)	32.1 (89.8)	26.2 (79.2)	18.8 (65.8)	40.6 (105.1)
Mean daily maximum °C (°F)	5.7 (42.3)	6.7 (44.1)	10.7 (51.3)	15.9 (60.6)	21.1 (70.0)	25.0 (77.0)	28.3 (82.9)	30.6 (87.1)	26.7 (80.1)	20.8 (69.4)	14.6 (58.3)	8.6 (47.5)	17.9 (64.2)
Daily mean °C (°F)	2.6 (36.7)	2.9 (37.2)	5.9 (42.6)	10.7 (51.3)	16.0 (60.8)	20.3 (68.5)	24.1 (75.4)	25.9 (78.6)	21.9 (71.4)	16.0 (60.8)	10.2 (50.4)	5.1 (41.2)	13.5 (56.3)
Mean daily minimum °C (°F)	−0.1 (31.8)	−0.3 (31.5)	1.8 (35.2)	6.3 (43.3)	11.9 (53.4)	16.7 (62.1)	21.1 (70.0)	22.5 (72.5)	18.4 (65.1)	12.2 (54.0)	6.5 (43.7)	1.9 (35.4)	9.9 (49.8)
Record low °C (°F)	−6.6 (20.1)	−6.4 (20.5)	−5.3 (22.5)	−1.3 (29.7)	4.6 (40.3)	10.0 (50.0)	14.4 (57.9)	15.0 (59.0)	7.9 (46.2)	3.9 (39.0)	−1.6 (29.1)	−3.3 (26.1)	−6.6 (20.1)
Average precipitation mm (inches)	181.6 (7.15)	111.3 (4.38)	114.8 (4.52)	103.4 (4.07)	91.3 (3.59)	127.9 (5.04)	273.7 (10.78)	150.4 (5.92)	160.5 (6.32)	154.3 (6.07)	219.0 (8.62)	247.4 (9.74)	1,962.9 (77.28)
Mean monthly sunshine hours	46.1	76.8	140.9	187.3	212.3	194.7	160.1	216.9	168.0	141.4	86.5	49.5	1,675.3
Source: Japan Meteorological Agency

== Transportation ==
=== Railway ===
JR East - Echigo Line

- Teradomari - Kirihara

In addition to this line, Echigo Kotsu Nagaoka Line(ja:越後交通長岡線) had been operated in the town until 1975.

=== Highway ===
- National Route 116
- National Route 402

=== Ports ===
- Teradomari Port
  - Sado Kisen Terminal

== Local attractions ==
- Teradomari Fish Market Street
- Teradomari Aquarium(ja:寺泊水族博物館)
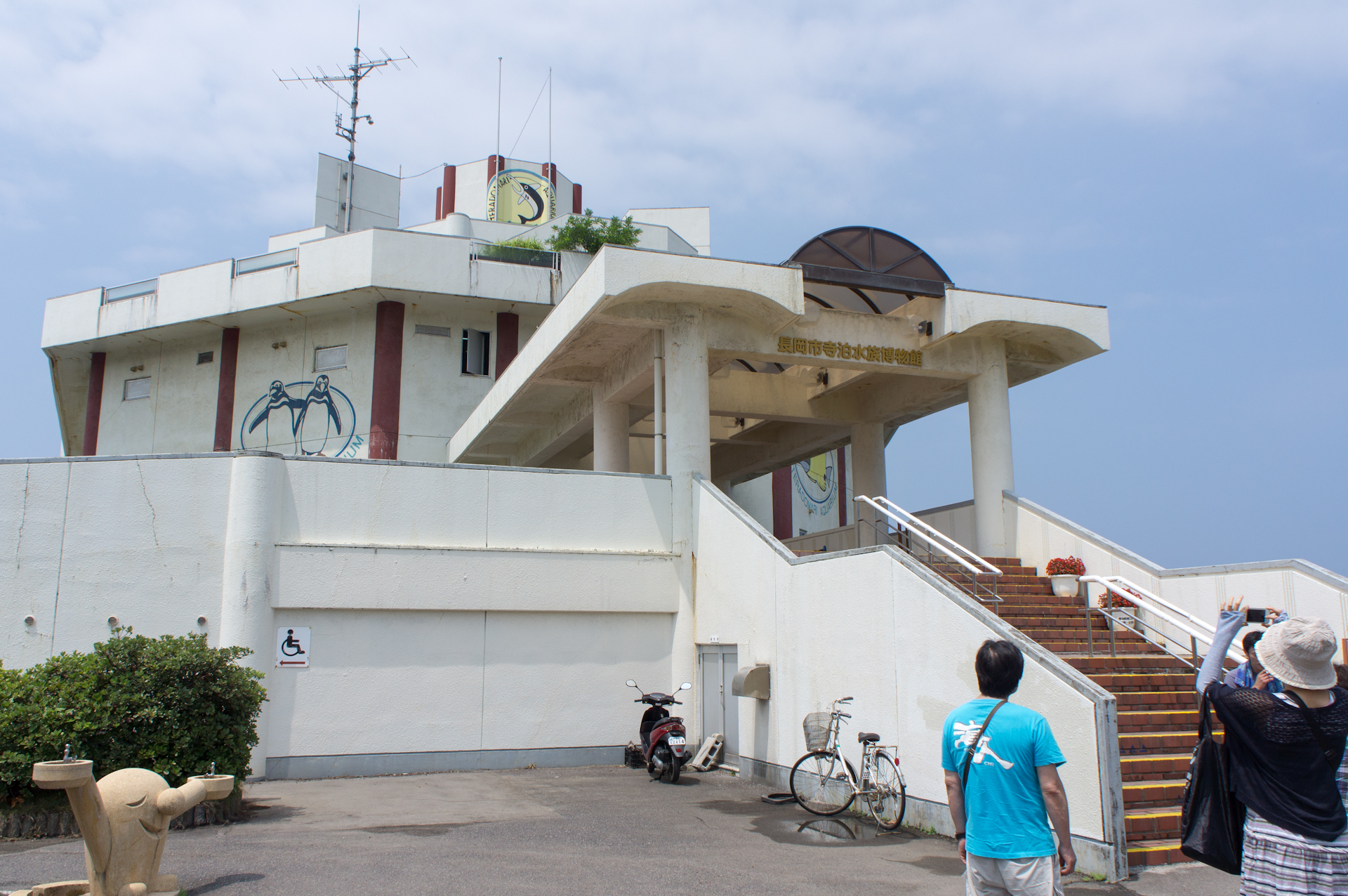
Teradomari Aquarium

== See also ==
Media related to Teradomari, Niigata at Wikimedia Commons
