= Kamitokoro Station =

Railway station in Niigata, Japan

Kamitokoro Station 上所駅
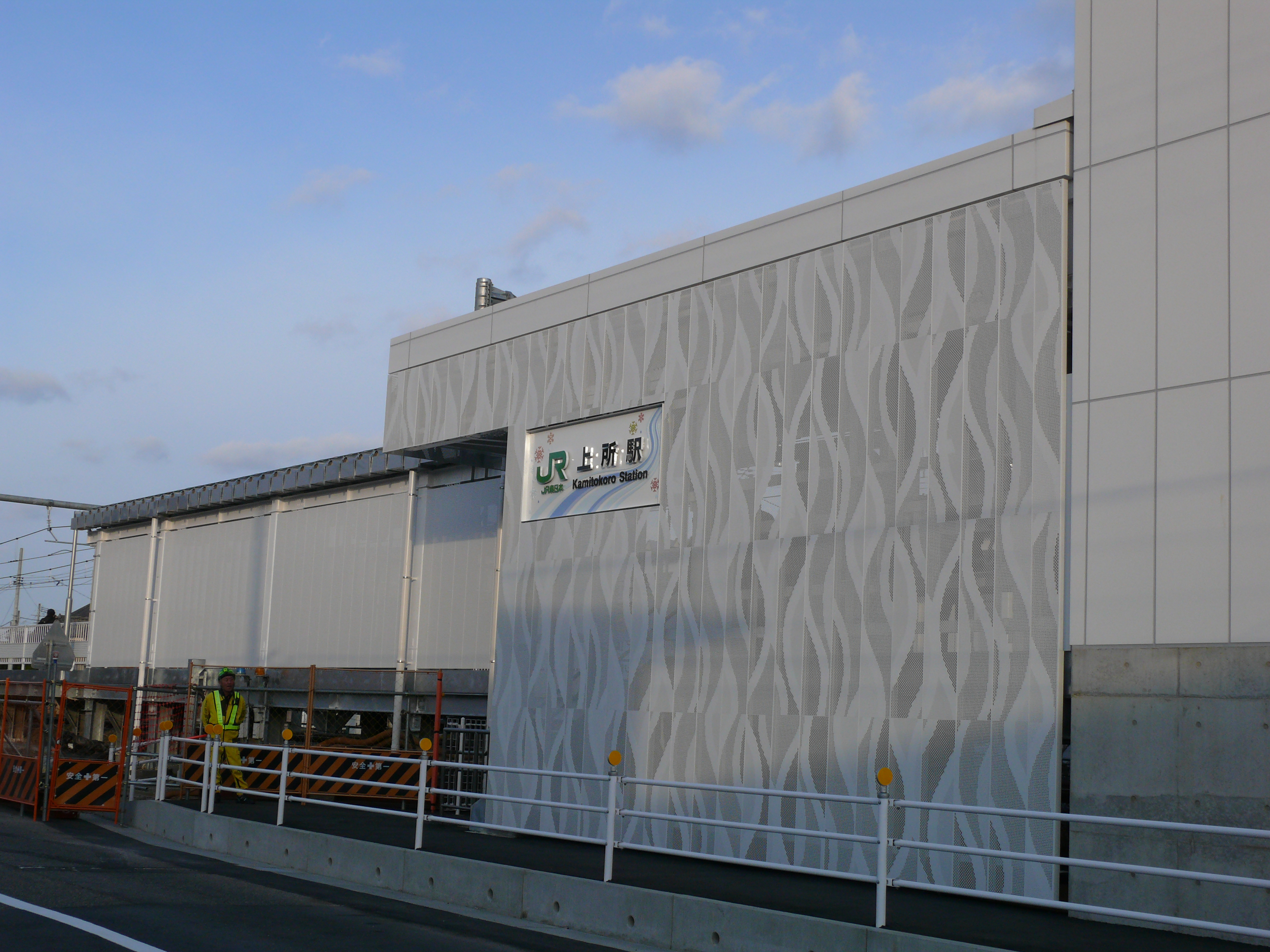
- The south side of Kamitokoro Station in March 2025

General information
- Location: 1-chōme-4 Shimotokorojima, Chūō-ku, Niigata-shi; Niigata-ken 950-0991; Japan
- Coordinates: 37°54′25″N 139°2′43″E
- Operator: JR East
- Line: ■ Echigo Line
- Distance: 82.3 km from Kashiwazaki
- Platforms: 2 side platforms
- Tracks: 2

Construction
- Accessible: Yes

Other information
- Status: Unstaffed
- Website: Official website

History
- Opened: 15 March 2025

Services
Preceding station	JR East	Following station
Hakusan towards Kashiwazaki	Echigo Line	Niigata Terminus
Location
- Location within Niigata Prefecture Location within Japan

Kamitokoro Station (上所駅, Kamitokoro-eki) is a railway station on the Echigo Line in Shimotokorojima 1-chome, Chūō-ku, Niigata, Japan. It is operated by East Japan Railway Company (JR East).

== History ==
In 2017, the Kamitokoro school district community council gathered approximately 17,000 signatures from the local residents to request the establishment of a new station. The Niigata city government allocated a budget for the consideration of the new station establishment in the fiscal year 2018 budget.

In February 2022, JR East and Niigata City agreed to build a station between Hakusan and Niigata on the Echigo Line. On 19 April 2023, the Hokuriku-Shinetsu District Transport Bureau approved the planned establishment of the new station. The new station was planned to open at the end of fiscal 2024.

The station name was announced on 1 June 2023. Construction started later that year. The station opened on 15 March 2025. The establishment was celebrated by the local residents as the first station to open in Niigata prefecture in 4 years since the Echigo Oshiage Hisui Kaigan Station in 2021.

== Lines ==
Kamitokoro Station is served by the Echigo Line, and is located 1.6 kilometres from Hakusan and 1.5 kilometres from Niigata. It is the west side of the Nishi-Kosenkyo overpass of the prefectural road 164, Hakusan station to Meike line.

The location of the tracks around this station was formerly shared by the industrial private lines for the Niigata Central Wholesale Market and the Nippon Light Metal plant until their discontinuation. The space was reused to make the Echigo line a double-track capacity. The additional space was repurposed for the west-bound track as a part of the grade separation improvements of the Echigo line.

== Station layout ==
The station has two opposed side platforms connected by an underpass. The platforms are 125 metres long and can accommodate trains that are at most six cars long. In addition, elevators are installed. It has a two-platform and two-track configuration. All local trains on the line stop at the station. It was built to be an unstaffed station.

=== Platforms ===
1	■ Echigo Line	for Uchino and Yoshida
2	■ Echigo Line	for Niigata

== Surrounding area ==
- Niigata Minami High School
- Niigata Unison Plaza
