= Hakusan Station (Niigata) =

Railway station in Niigata, Japan

Hakusan Station 白山駅
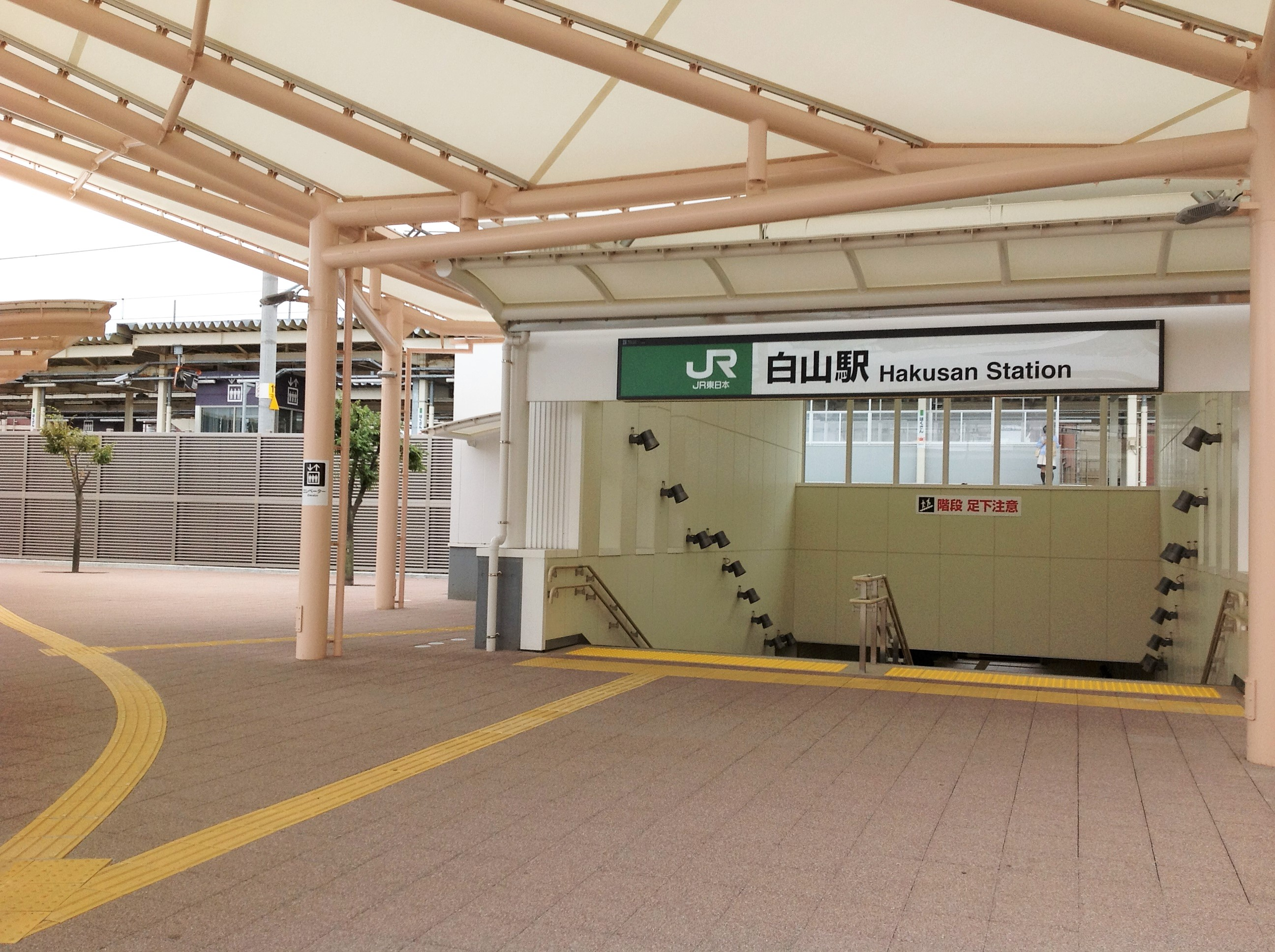
- The north entrance of Hakusan Station in September 2015

General information
- Location: 2-647 Hakusan-ura, Chūō-ku, Niigata-shi, Niigata-ken 951-8131; Japan
- Coordinates: 37°54′44″N 139°01′49″E
- Operator: JR East
- Line: ■ Echigo Line
- Distance: 80.7 km from Kashiwazaki
- Platforms: 2 island platforms
- Tracks: 4
- Connections: ■ Bandai-bashi Line

Other information
- Status: Staffed ("Midori no Madoguchi")
- Website: Official website

History
- Opened: 15 December 1951

Passengers
- FY2017: 5,360 daily

Services
Preceding station	JR East	Following station
Sekiya towards Kashiwazaki	Echigo Line	Kamitokoro towards Niigata
Location
- Location within JR Echigo Line Location within BRT Bandai-bashi Line Location within Japan

Hakusan Station (白山駅, Hakusan-eki) is a railway station on the Echigo Line in Chūō-ku, Niigata, Japan, operated by East Japan Railway Company (JR East).

== Lines ==
Hakusan Station is served by the Echigo Line, and is 80.7 kilometers from the starting point of the line at Kashiwazaki Station.

== Station layout ==
The station has a "Midori no Madoguchi" staffed ticket counter. Suica farecards can be used at this station.

=== Platforms ===
1/2	■ Echigo Line	for Niigata
3/4	■ Echigo Line	for Uchino and Yoshida

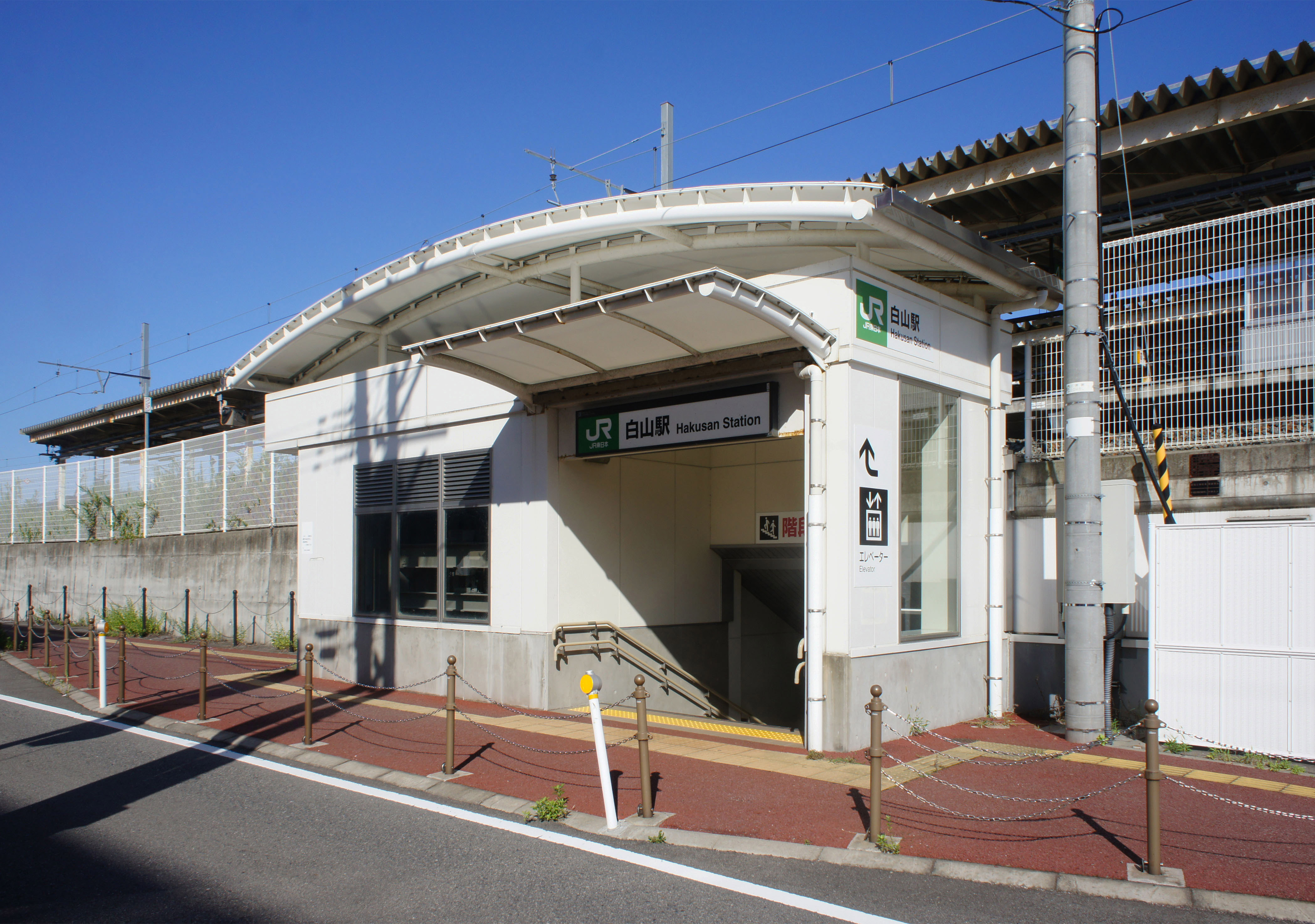
The south entrance in September 2021

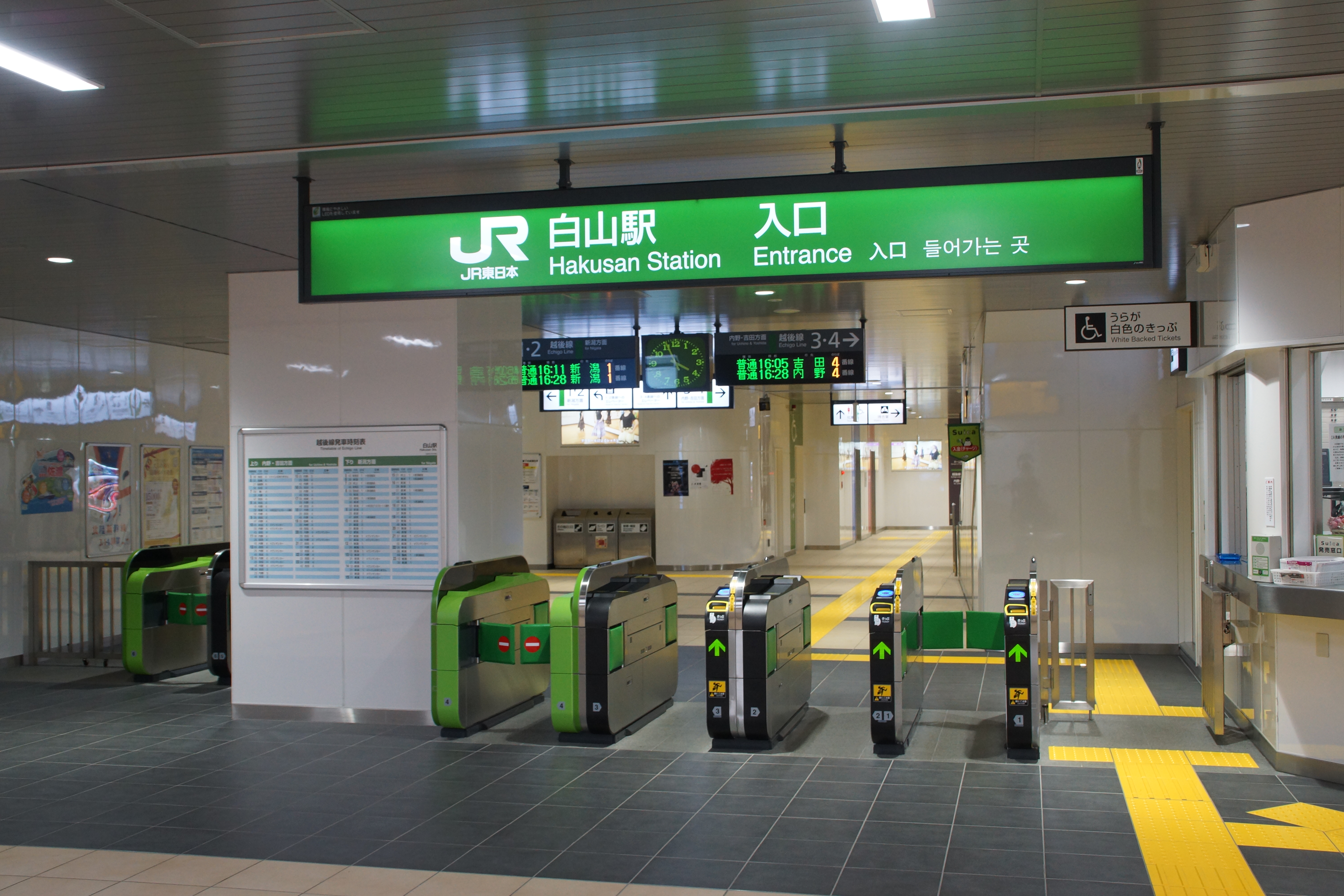
The ticket barriers in February 2015

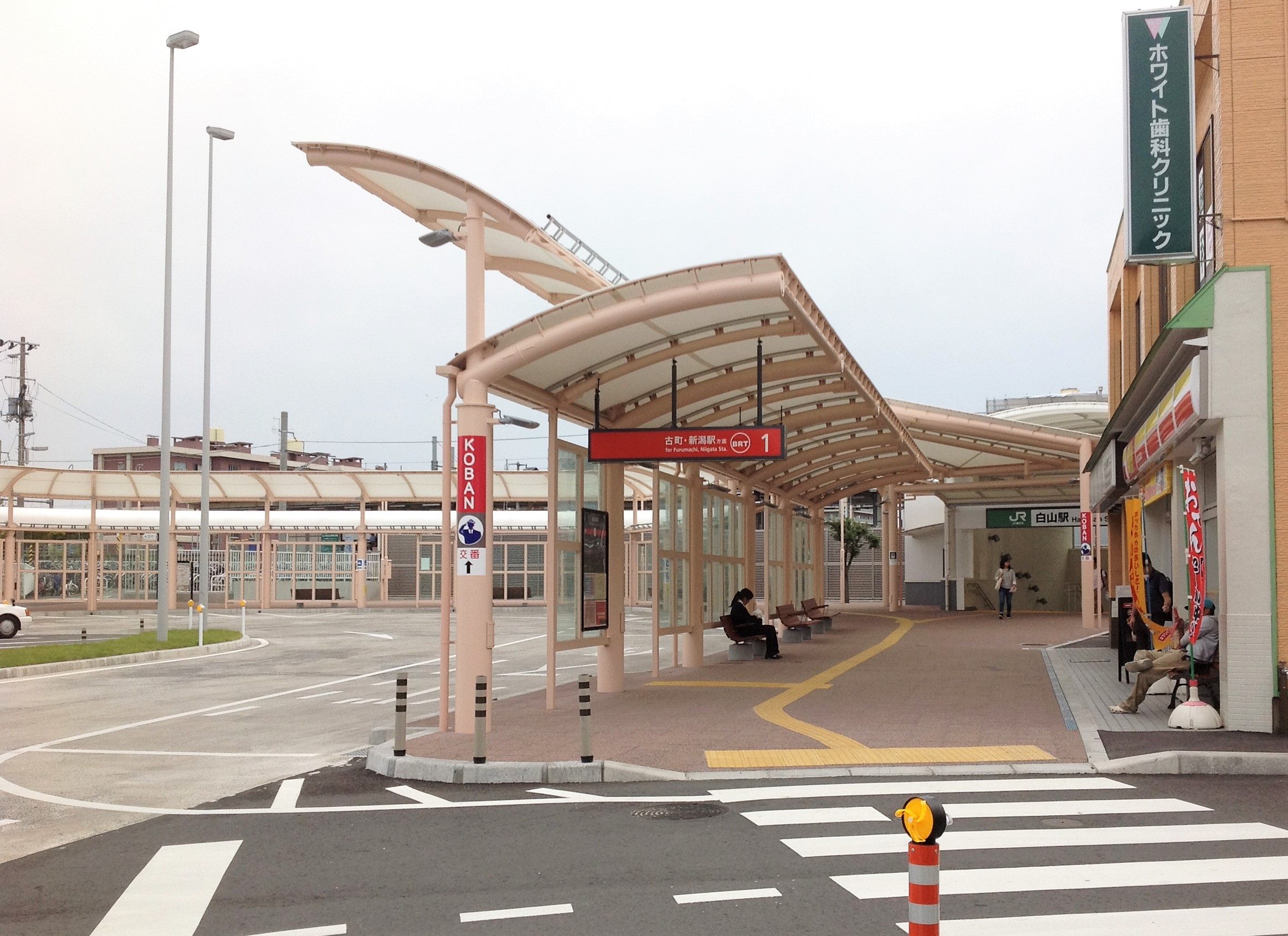
Bus stops on the north side in September 2015

== History ==
The station opened on 15 December 1951. With the privatization of Japanese National Railways (JNR) on 1 April 1987, the station came under the control of JR East.

== Passenger statistics ==
In fiscal 2017, the station was used by an average of 5360 passengers daily (boarding passengers only). The passenger figures for previous years are as shown below.

Fiscal year	Daily average
2000	6,004
2005	5,267
2010	5,363
2011	5,147
2015	5,437

== Surrounding area ==
- Hakusan Park
- Niigata City Athletic Stadium
- Niigata-City Performing Arts Center (Ryutopia)
- Niigata Prefectural Civic Center
- Niigata City Gymnasium

== See also ==
- List of railway stations in Japan
