= Sekiya Station (Niigata) =

Railway station in Niigata, Japan

Sekiya Station 関屋駅
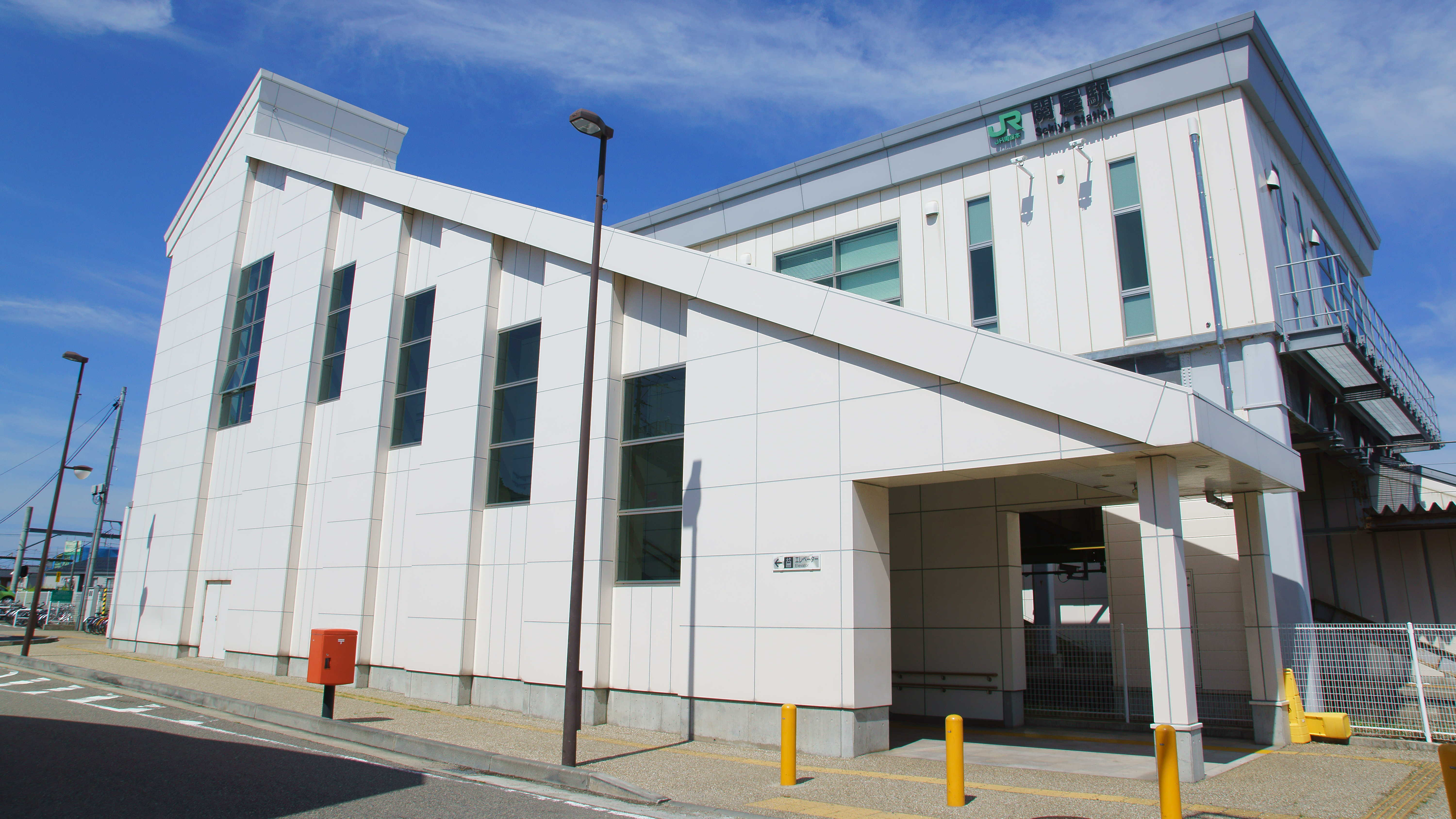
- South side of Sekiya Station, August 2016

General information
- Location: 2-2-1 Sekiya-Okawa-mae, Chūō-ku, Niigata-shi, Niigata-ken 951-814; Japan
- Coordinates: 37°54′21″N 139°00′54″E
- Operator: JR East
- Line: ■ Echigo Line
- Distance: 79.2 km from Kashiwazaki
- Platforms: 1 island platform

Other information
- Website: www.jreast.co.jp/estation/station/info.aspx?StationCd=907

History
- Opened: 15 November 1913

Passengers
- FY2015: 1,938 daily

Services
Preceding station	JR East	Following station
Aoyama towards Kashiwazaki	Echigo Line	Hakusan towards Niigata
Location
- Location within JR Echigo Line Location within Japan

Sekiya Station (関屋駅, Sekiya-eki) is a train station in Chūō-ku, Niigata, Niigata Prefecture, Japan, operated by East Japan Railway Company (JR East).

== Lines ==
Sekiya Station is served by the Echigo Line, and is 79.2 kilometers from terminus of the line at Kashiwazaki.

== Station layout ==
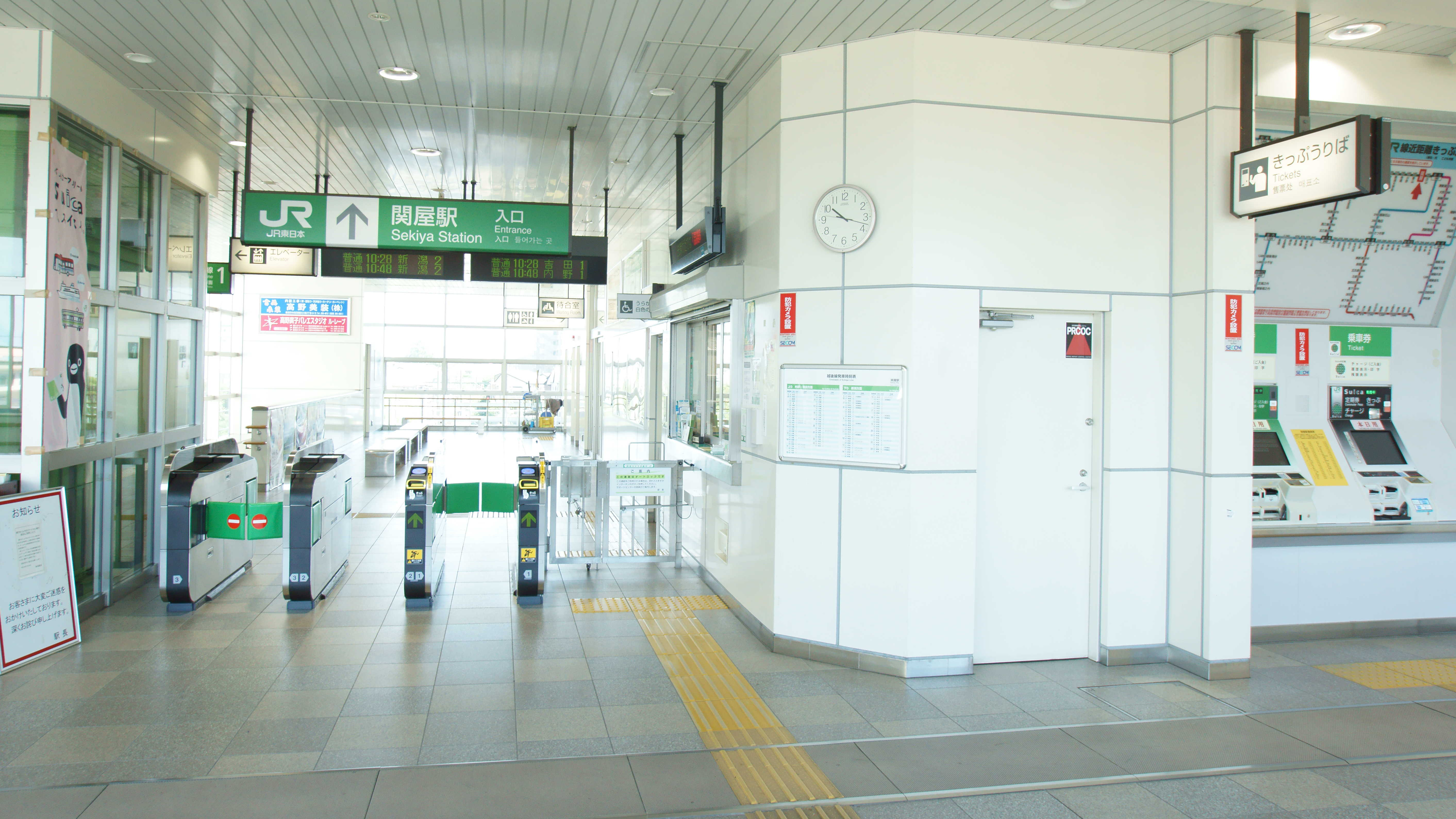
The gate, August 2016

The station consists of an island platform serving two tracks, with the station situated above the tracks.

The station has a "Midori no Madoguchi" staffed ticket office. Suica farecard can be used at this station.

=== Platforms ===
1	■ Echigo Line	for Uchino and Yoshida
2	■ Echigo Line	for Niigata

== History ==
The station opened on 15 November 1913. With the privatization of Japanese National Railways (JNR) on 1 April 1987, the station came under the control of JR East.

== Passenger statistics ==
In fiscal 2017, the station was used by an average of 1939 passengers daily (boarding passengers only).

== Surrounding area ==
- Niigata Daiichi High School
- National Route 460
