= Izumozaki =

Izumozaki 出雲崎町
- Town
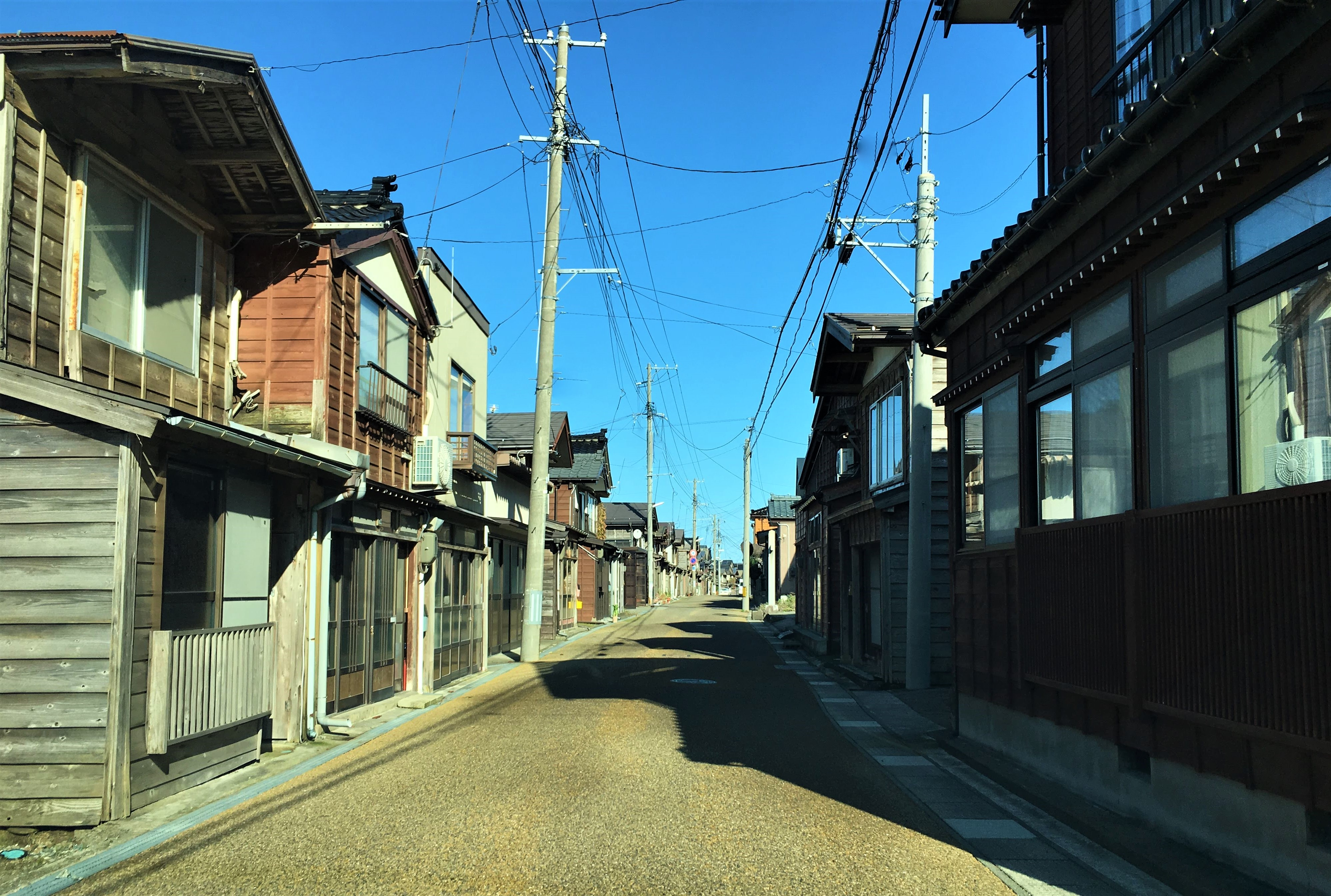
- Izumozaki cityscape

- Flag Seal

- Location of Izumozaki in Niigata

- Coordinates: 37°31′50.6″N 138°42′33.6″E
- Country: Japan
- Region: Chūbu (Kōshin'etsu) (Hokuriku)
- Prefecture: Niigata
- District: Santō

Area
  - Total: 44.38 km^{2} (17.14 sq mi)

Population (July 1, 2019)
  - Total: 4,190
  - Density: 94.4/km^{2} (245/sq mi)
- Time zone: UTC+9 (Japan Standard Time)
- Symbols
  - Tree: Zelkova serrata
  - Flower: Azalea
- Phone number: 0258-78-3111
- Address: 140 Kawanishi, Izumozaki-cho, Santō-gun, Niigata-ken 949-4353
- Website: Official website

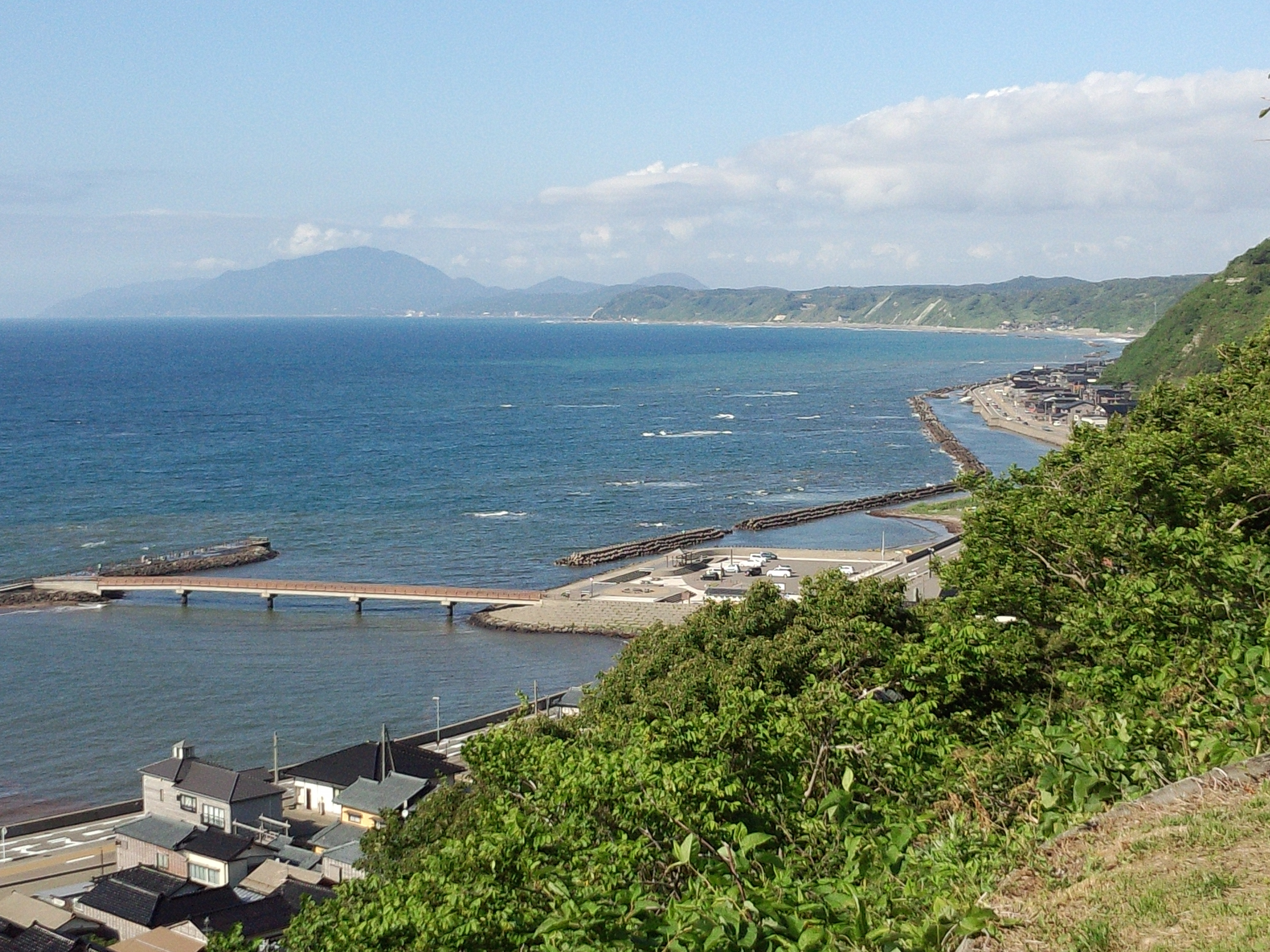
Izumozaki coastline

Izumozaki (出雲崎町, Izumozaki-machi) is a town located in Niigata Prefecture, Japan. As of 1 July 2019, the town had an estimated population of 4,190, and a population density of 94.4 persons per km^{2}. The total area of the town was 44.38 square kilometres (17.14 sq mi).

== Geography ==
Izumozaki is located in a coastal region of central Niigata Prefecture bordered by the Sea of Japan to the west.

=== Surrounding municipalities ===
- Niigata Prefecture
  - Kashiwazaki
  - Nagaoka

== Climate ==
Izumozaki has a humid subtropical climate (Köppen Cfa) characterized by warm, wet summers and cold winters with heavy snowfall. The average annual temperature in Izumozaki is 12.6 °C. The average annual rainfall is 2261 mm with September as the wettest month. The temperatures are highest on average in August, at around 25.7 °C, and lowest in January, at around 0.7 °C.

== Demographics ==
Per Japanese census data, the population of Izumozaki has declined steadily over the past 50 years.

Historical population
Year	Pop.	±%
1970	8,170	—
1980	7,048	−13.7%
1990	6,421	−8.9%
2000	5,814	−9.5%
2010	4,907	−15.6%
2020	4,113	−16.2%

== History ==
The area of present-day Izumozaki was part of ancient Echigo Province. During the Edo period, it was tenryō territory controlled directly by the Tokugawa shogunate, and the location of the Izumozaki daikansho. The great Zen poet and calligrapher Ryōkan was born in Izumozaki in 1758. After the start of the Meiji period, the area was organised into Santō District, Niigata, and the town of Izumozaki was established on April 1, 1886, with the creation of the modern municipalities system. Om April 1, 1904, Izumozaki annexed the neighbouring town of Amaze. Izumozaki merged with the neighbouring village of Nishikoshi on June 20, 1957.

== Economy ==
Commercial fishing dominates the local economy. A large percentage of the working population commutes to neighbouring Nagaoka or Kashiwazaki.

== Education ==
Izumozaki has one public elementary school and one public middle school operated the town government. The town has one public high school operated by the Niigata Prefectural Board of Education..

== Transportation ==
=== Railway ===
- – Echigo Line
  - Oginojō - Izumozaki

=== Highway ===
- National Route 116
- National Route 352
- National Route 402
- National Route 460
