= Nishi-ku, Niigata =

Ward of Niigata City in Chūbu, Japan

Nishi-ku 西区
- Ward
- Nishi Ward
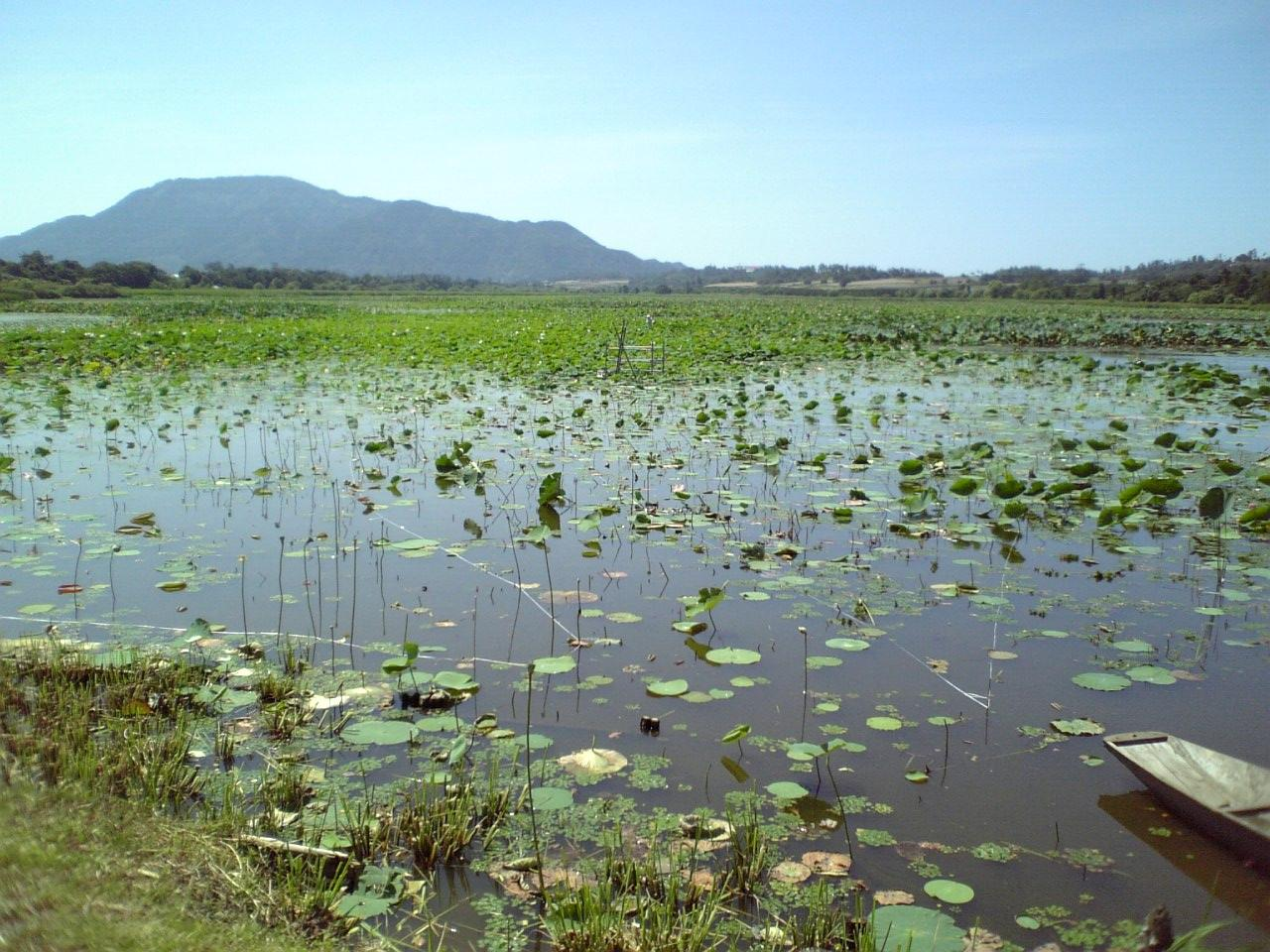
- Sakata Lagoon

- Location of Nishi-ku in Niigata City

- Coordinates: 37°52′26.7″N 138°58′17.8″E
- Country: Japan
- Region: Kōshin'etsu, Hokuriku (Chūbu)
- Prefecture: Niigata
- City: Niigata

Area
  - Total: 94.09 km^{2} (36.33 sq mi)

Population (September 1, 2018)
  - Total: 161,884
  - Density: 1,721/km^{2} (4,456/sq mi)
- Time zone: UTC+9 (Japan Standard Time)
- Address: 3-14-41 Terao-Higashi, Nishi-ku, Niigata-shi, Niigata 950-2097
- Phone number: 025-268-1000
- Website: Official website

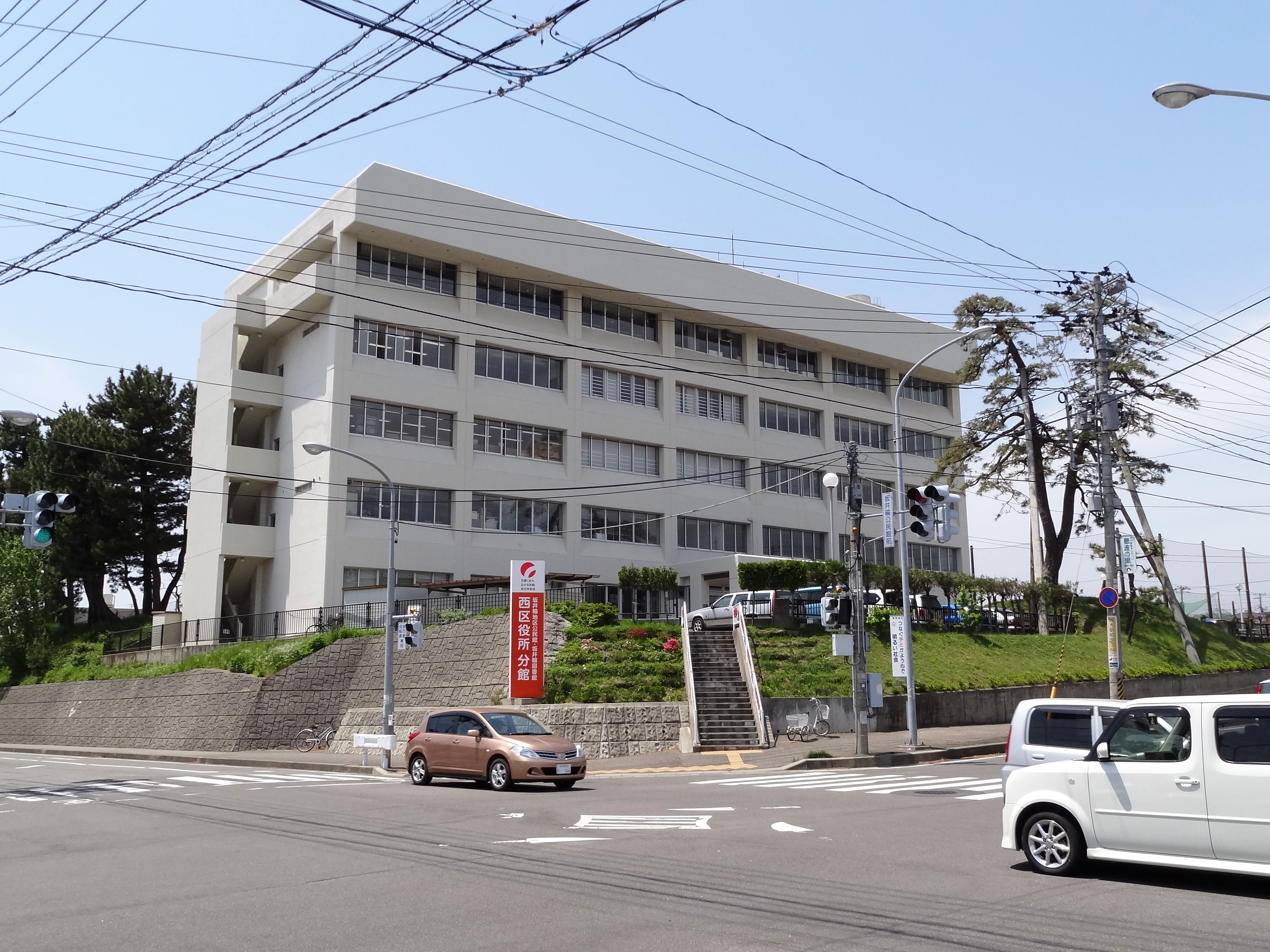
Nishi Ward Office annex

Nishi-ku (西区, Nishi-ku) is one of the eight wards of Niigata City, Niigata Prefecture, in the Hokuriku region of Japan. As of 1 September 2016, the ward had an estimated population of 161,884 in 68,119 households and a population density of 1700 persons per km^{2}. The total area of the ward was 94.09 square kilometres (36.33 sq mi).

== Geography ==
Nishi-ku is located in a central Niigata city, bordered by the Sea of Japan to the north. The Shinano River flow through the ward.

=== Surrounding municipalities ===
- Niigata Prefecture
  - Chūō-ku, Niigata
  - Kōnan-ku, Niigata
  - Minami-ku, Niigata
  - Nishikan-ku, Niigata

== History ==
The area of present-day Nishi-ku was part of ancient Echigo Province. The village of Kurosaki (黒埼) was founded on November 1, 1901, by the merger of five villages, and was raised to town status on February 1, 1973. It was annexed by Niigata city on January 1, 2001. The villages of Uchino (内野), Akatsuka (赤塚) and Nakanokoya (中野小屋) were also established on November 1, 1901. Uchino was raised to town status on October 1, 1928, and was annexed by Niigata city on January 11, 1960. Niigata annexed Akatsuka and Nakanokoya on June 1, 1961. Niigata became a government-designated city on April 1, 2007, and was divided into wards, with the new Nishi Ward consisting of the former towns of Kurosaki and Uchino, and villages of Akatsuka and Nakanokoya.

== Education ==
=== Universities and colleges ===
- Meirin College
- Niigata College of Technology
- Niigata University (Ikarashi Campus)
- Niigata University of International and Information Studies

=== Secondary schools ===
Nishi-ku has eight public middle schools operated by the Niigata city government. The ward has three public high schools operated by the Niigata Prefectural Board of Education, one private high school and one private combined middle/high school.

== Transportation ==
=== Railway ===
JR East - Echigo Line

- Aoyama - Kobari - Terao - Niigata Daigaku-mae - Uchino - Uchino-Nishigaoka - Echigo-Akatsuka

=== Transit bus ===
- Transit bus operated by Niigata Kotsu
  - BRT "Bandai-bashi Line"
  - C2 / C3
  - W1 / W2 / W3 / W4 / W5 / W6 / W7 / W8

=== Water Shuttle ===
- Shinanogawa Water Shuttle: (Minatopia) - - - (Niigata Prefectural office) - Furusato Village

=== Highway ===
- Hokuriku Expressway
- National Route 8
- National Route 116
- National Route 402

== Local attractions ==
Aerial video of Kurosaki Festival Fireworks

=== Places ===
- NIIGATA FURUSATO VILLAGE
- Sakata Lagoon

=== Events ===
- Kurosaki Festival
- Sea of Japan Sunset Concert
