= Myōhōji Station =

Myōhōji Station is the name of two train stations in Japan:

- Myōhōji Station (Hyōgo)
- Myōhōji Station (Niigata)
