= Uchino-Nishigaoka Station =

Railway station in Niigata, Japan

Uchino-Nishigaoka Station 内野西が丘駅
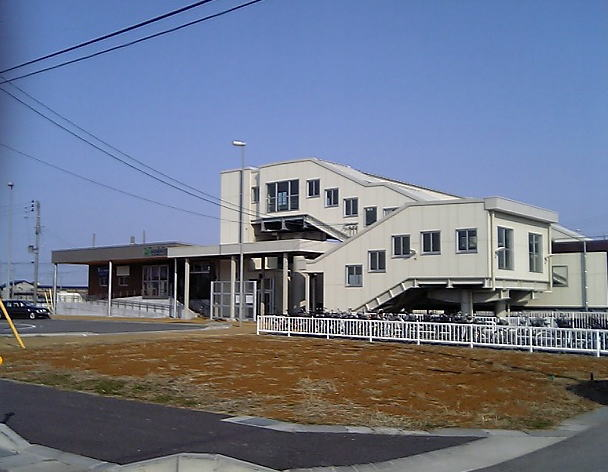
- West side of Uchino-Nishigaoka Station, March 2006

General information
- Location: Uchinosakiyama, Nishi-ku, Niigata-shi, Niigata-ken 950-2153; Japan
- Coordinates: 37.8464°N 138.9267°E
- Operator: JR East
- Line: ■Echigo Line
- Distance: 68.7 km from Kashiwazaki
- Platforms: 1 side platform
- Tracks: 1

Other information
- Status: Unstaffed
- Website: www.jreast.co.jp/estation/station/info.aspx?StationCd=1718

History
- Opened: 1 March 2005

Passengers
- FY2010: 1,079 daily

Services
Preceding station	JR East	Following station
Echigo-Akatsuka towards Kashiwazaki	Echigo Line	Uchino towards Niigata
Location
- Location within JR Echigo Line Location within Japan

Uchino-Nishigaoka Station (内野西が丘駅, Uchino-Nishigaoka-eki) is a train station in Nishi-ku, Niigata, Niigata Prefecture, Japan, operated by East Japan Railway Company (JR East).

== Lines ==
Uchino-Nishigaoka Station is served by the Echigo Line, and is 68.7 kilometers from terminus of the line at Kashiwazaki.

== Station layout ==
The station consists of one side platform serving a single bi-directional track.

Suica farecard can be used at this station.

== History ==
The station opened on 1 March 2005.

== Surrounding area ==
- Nishi High School

== See also ==
- List of railway stations in Japan
