= Echigo-Akatsuka Station =

Railway station in Niigata, Japan

Echigo-Akatsuka Station 越後赤塚駅
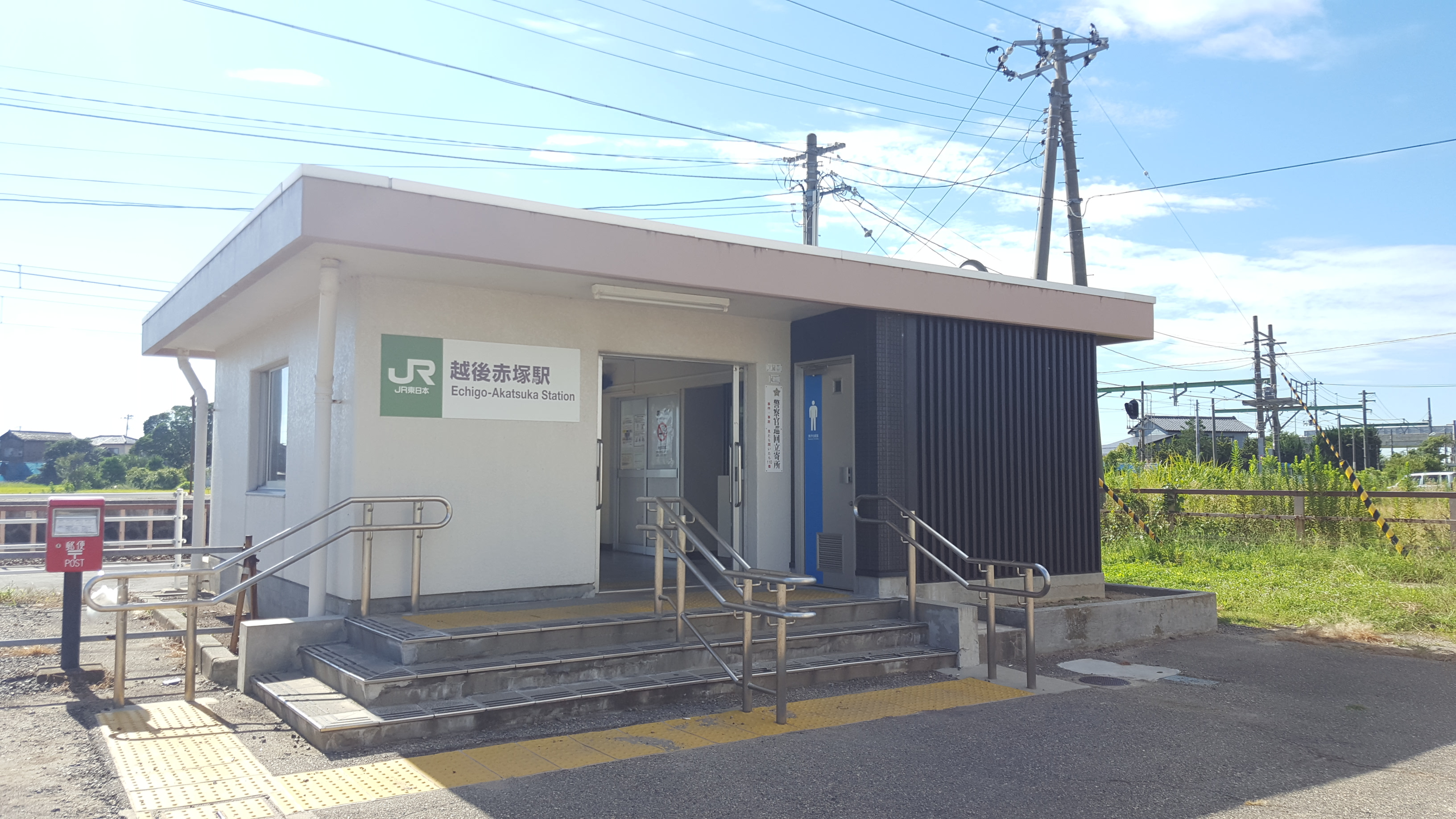
- Echigo-Akatsuka Station building in August 2018

General information
- Location: 886 Akatsuka, Nishi-ku, Niigata-shi, Niigata-ken; Japan
- Coordinates: 37.8161°N 138.9081°E
- Elevation: 4.4 m
- Operator: JR East
- Line: ■Echigo Line
- Distance: 64.9 km from Kashiwazaki
- Platforms: 1 island platform
- Tracks: 2

Other information
- Status: Unstaffed
- Website: Official website

History
- Opened: 25 December 1914

Passengers
- FY2010: 915 daily

Services
Preceding station	JR East	Following station
Echigo-Sone towards Kashiwazaki	Echigo Line	Uchino-Nishigaoka towards Niigata
Location
- Location within JR Echigo Line Location within Japan

Echigo-Akatsuka Station (越後赤塚駅, Echigo-Akatsuka-eki) is a railway station on the Echigo Line in Nishi-ku, Niigata, Niigata Prefecture, Japan, operated by East Japan Railway Company (JR East).

== Lines ==
Echigo-Akatsuka Station is served by the 83.8 km (52.1 mi) Echigo Line, and is 64.9 km (40.3 mi) from starting point of the line at Kashiwazaki.

== Station layout ==
The station consists of a ground-level island platform serving two tracks. The station is unattended. Suica farecard can be used at this station.

=== Platforms ===
1	■ Echigo Line	for Niigata
2	■ Echigo Line	for Yoshida and Niigata (bidirectional)

== History ==
The station opened on 25 December 1914. With the privatization of Japanese National Railways (JNR) on 1 April 1987, the station came under the control of JR East.

== Surrounding area ==
- Niigata University of International and Information Studies
- Sakata Lagoon

== See also ==
- List of railway stations in Japan
