= Aoyama Station (Niigata) =

Railway station in Niigata, Japan

Aoyama Station 青山駅
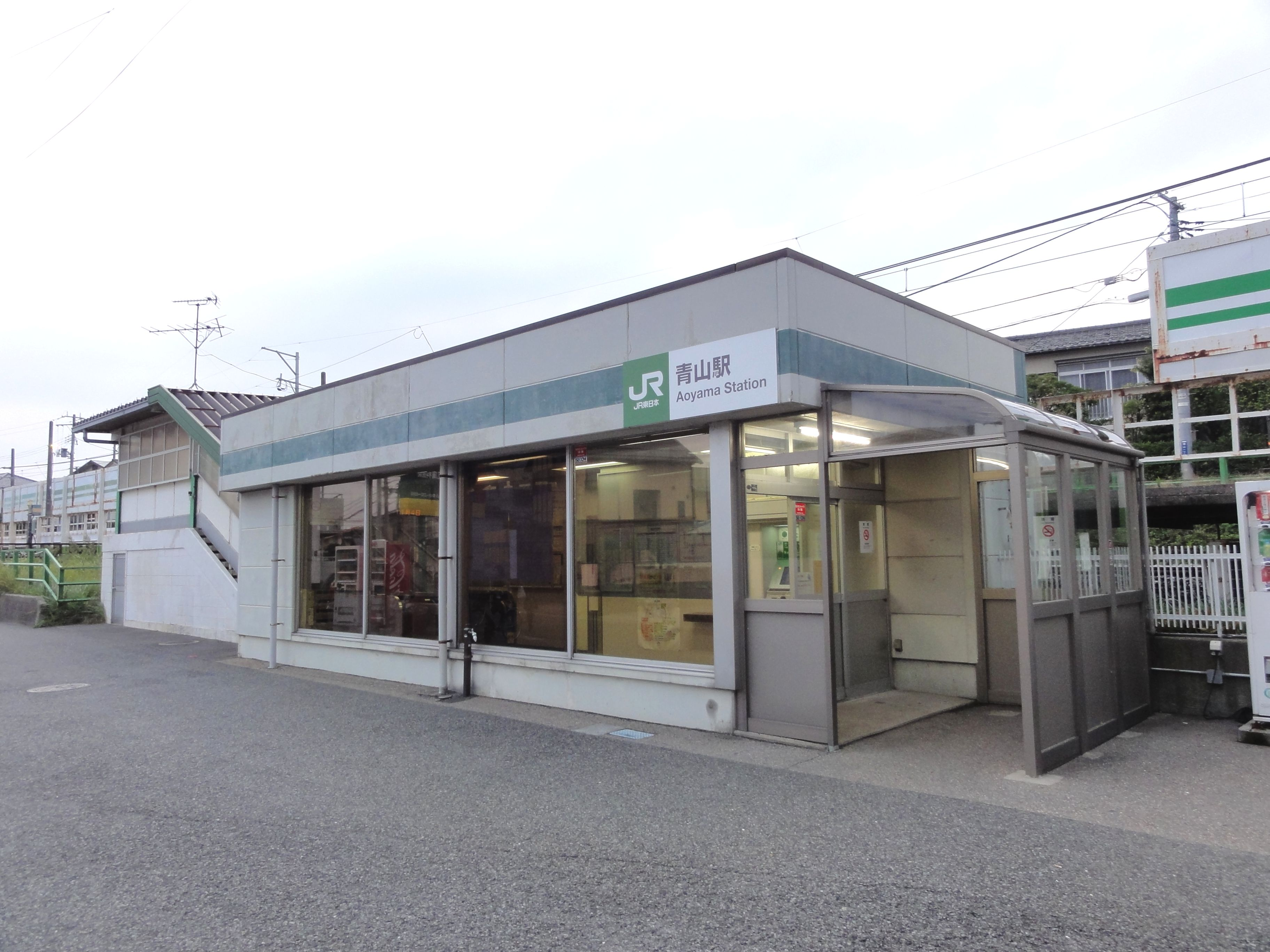
- Aoyama Station, October 2012

General information
- Location: 1 Urayama, Nishi-ku, Niigata-shi, Niigata-ken 950-2001; Japan
- Coordinates: 37°53′55.54″N 139°00′06″E
- Operator: JR East
- Line: ■Echigo Line
- Distance: 77.7 km from Kashiwazaki
- Platforms: 1 side platform

Other information
- Status: Staffed
- Website: Official website

History
- Opened: 13 March 1988

Passengers
- FY2017: 1,051 daily

Services
Preceding station	JR East	Following station
Kobari towards Kashiwazaki	Echigo Line	Sekiya towards Niigata
Location
- Location within JR Echigo Line Location within Japan

Aoyama Station (青山駅, Aoyama-eki) is a train station in Nishi-ku, Niigata, Niigata Prefecture, Japan, operated by East Japan Railway Company (JR East).

== Lines ==
Aoyama Station is served by the Echigo Line, and is 77.7 kilometers from terminus of the line at Kashiwazaki.

== Station layout ==
The station consists of one ground-level side platform serving a single bi-directional track. The station is staffed.

Suica farecard can be used at this station.

== History ==
The station opened on 13 March 1988.

== Passenger statistics ==
In fiscal 2017, the station was used by an average of 1051 passengers daily (boarding passengers only).

== Surrounding area ==
- BRT "Bandai-bashi Line" bus stop 'Aoyama' (Stop No.16) is located on the southeast side of AEON Niigata Aoyama Shopping Center, about 10 minutes' walk away from the station

== See also ==
- List of railway stations in Japan
