= Aōzu Station =

Railway station in Tsubame, Niigata Prefecture, Japan

Aōzu Station 粟生津駅
- Aōzu Station in September 2026

General information
- Location: Aozu, Tsubame-shi, Niigata-ken 959-0222; Japan
- Coordinates: 37.6541°N 138.8733°E
- Operator: JR East
- Line: ■ Echigo Line
- Distance: 45.8 km from Kashiwazaki
- Platforms: 1 side platform
- Tracks: 1

Other information
- Status: Unstaffed
- Website: Official website

History
- Opened: 28 December 1912

Services
Preceding station	JR East	Following station
Bunsui towards Kashiwazaki	Echigo Line	Minami-Yoshida towards Niigata
Location
- Location within JR Echigo Line Location within Japan

Aōzu Station (粟生津駅, Aōzu-eki) is a railway station in the city of Tsubame, Niigata, Japan, operated by East Japan Railway Company (JR East).

== Lines ==
Aōzu Station is served by the Echigo Line, and is 45.8 kilometers from terminus of the line at Kashiwazaki.

== Station layout ==
The station consists of one ground-level side platform serving a single bi-directional track.

The station is unattended. Suica farecard cannot be used at this station.

== History ==
The station opened on 20 July 1914. With the privatization of Japanese National Railways (JNR) on 1 April 1987, the station came under the control of JR East.

== Surrounding area ==
- National Route 114
- Aōzu Elementary School

== See also ==
- List of railway stations in Japan
