= Teradomari Station =

Railway station in Nagaoka, Niigata Prefecture, Japan

Teradomari Station 寺泊駅
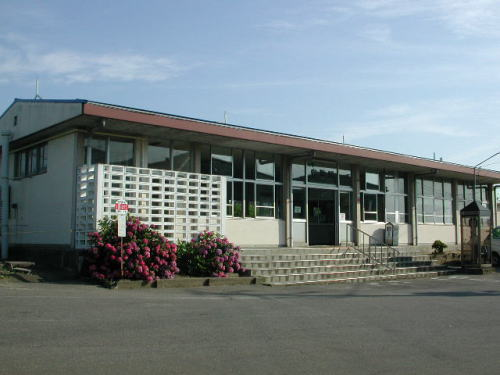
- Teradomari Station, July 2004

General information
- Location: Teradomari-Takemori, Nagaoka-shi, Niigata-ken 959-0161; Japan
- Coordinates: 37°37′13.46″N 138°48′49.62″E
- Operator: JR East
- Line: ■ Echigo Line
- Distance: 39.0 km from Kashiwazaki
- Platforms: 1 side + 1 island platform
- Tracks: 3

Other information
- Status: Staffed
- Website: www.jreast.co.jp/estation/station/info.aspx?StationCd=1031

History
- Opened: 20 April 1913
- Former names: Ōkozu Station (to 1986)

Passengers
- FY2017: 177 (daily)

Services
Preceding station	JR East	Following station
Kirihara towards Kashiwazaki	Echigo Line	Bunsui towards Niigata
Location
- Location within JR Echigo Line Location within Japan

Teradomari Station (寺泊駅, Teradomari-eki) is a railway station in the city of Nagaoka, Niigata, Japan, operated by East Japan Railway Company (JR East).

== Lines ==
Teradomari Station is served by the Echigo Line and is 39.0 kilometers from the terminus of the line at Kashiwazaki Station.

== Station layout ==
The station consists of a one ground-level side platform and one island platform serving three tracks, connected by a footbridge. The station is staffed.

Suica farecard cannot be used at this station.

=== Platforms ===
1	■ Echigo Line	for Yoshida and Niigata for Higashi-Sanjō for Izumozaki and Kashiwazaki
2	■ Echigo Line	for Yoshida, Niigata (peak time only)
2	■ Echigo Line	for Kashiwazaki (peak time only)

== History ==
Teradomari Station opened on 20 April 1913. It was renamed as Ōkozu Station (大河津駅, Ōkozu Station) on 1 October 1915. It reverted to its former name on 11 January 1986. With the privatization of Japanese National Railways (JNR) on 1 April 1987, the station came under the control of JR East.

== Passenger statistics ==
In fiscal 2017, the station was used by an average of 177 passengers daily (boarding passengers only).

== See also ==
- List of railway stations in Japan

== Surrounding area ==
- Sado Steamship Line Teradomari Ferry Terminal
