= Bunsui Station =

Railway station in Tsubame, Niigata Prefecture, Japan

Bunsui Station 分水駅
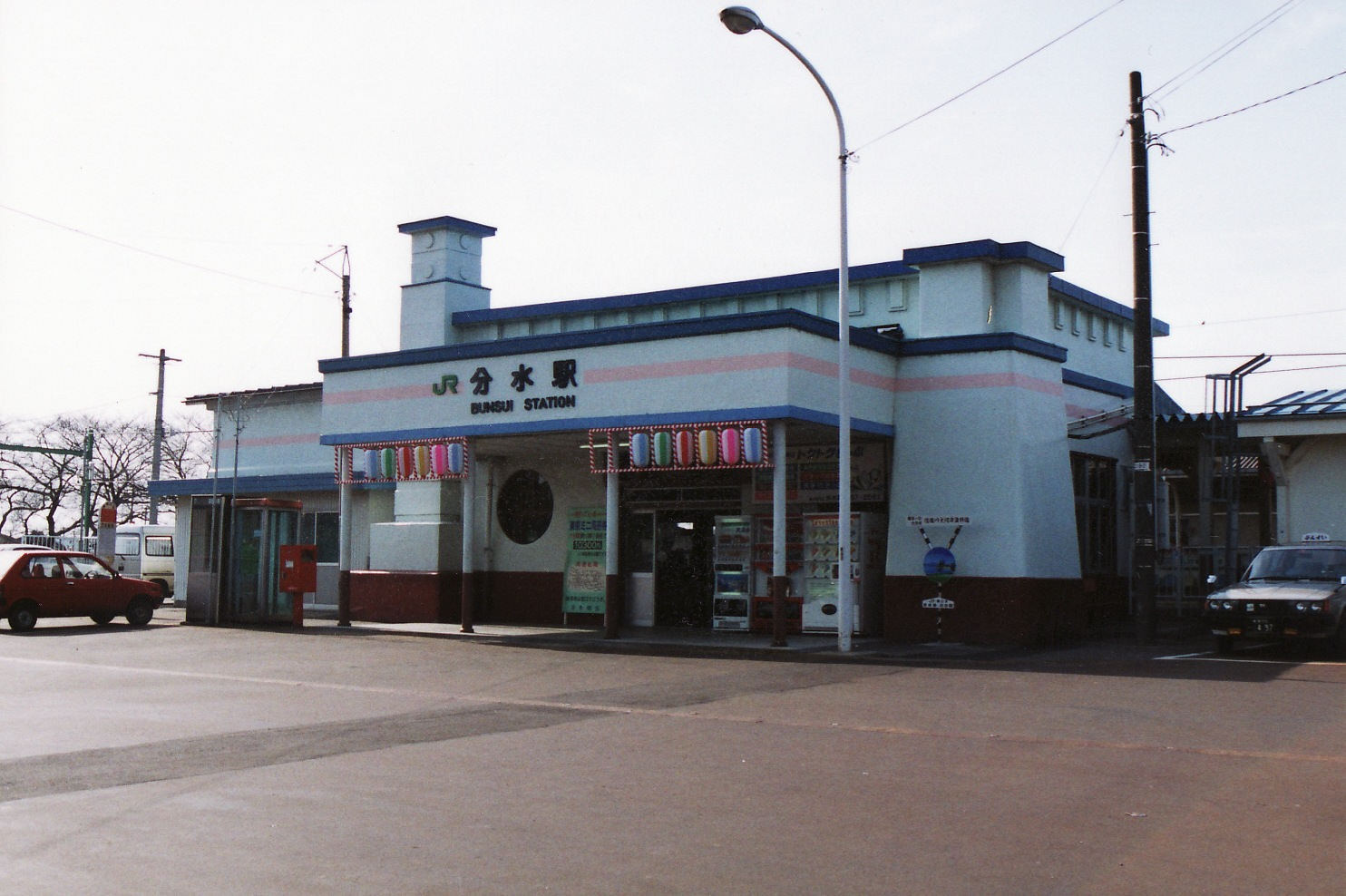
- Bunsui Station in April 1995

General information
- Location: Bunsui Sakuramachi, Tsubame-shi, Niigata-ken 959-0130; Japan
- Coordinates: 37.6290°N 138.8392°E
- Operator: JR East
- Line: ■ Echigo Line
- Distance: 41.5 km from Kashiwazaki
- Platforms: 2 side platforms
- Tracks: 2

Other information
- Status: Staffed (Midori no Madoguchi)
- Website: Official website

History
- Opened: 28 December 1912
- Former names: Jizodo Station (to 1983)

Passengers
- FY2017: 496 daily

Services
Preceding station	JR East	Following station
Teradomari towards Kashiwazaki	Echigo Line	Aōzu towards Niigata
Location
- Location within JR Echigo Line Location within Japan

Bunsui Station (分水駅, Bunsui-eki) is a railway station in the city of Tsubame, Niigata, Japan, operated by East Japan Railway Company (JR East).

== Lines ==
Bunsui Station is served by the Echigo Line, and is 41.5 kilometers from terminus of the line at Kashiwazaki.

== Station layout ==
The station consists of two ground-level side platforms serving two tracks. However, one of the platforms is not normally used. The platforms are connected by an underground passageway.

The station has a Midori no Madoguchi staffed ticket office. Suica farecard cannot be used at this station.

=== Platforms ===
1	■ Echigo Line	for Yoshida and Niigata for Kashiwazaki
2	■ Echigo Line	(not in service)

== History ==
The station opened on 28 December 1912 as Jizodo Station (地蔵堂駅, Jizo-do-eki). It was renamed to its present name on 1 April 1983. With the privatization of Japanese National Railways (JNR) on 1 April 1987, the station came under the control of JR East. A new station building was completed March 2000.

== Passenger statistics ==
In fiscal 2017, the station was used by an average of 496 passengers daily (boarding passengers only).

== Surrounding area ==
- Bunsui Post Office

== See also ==
- List of railway stations in Japan
