= Tochio, Niigata =

Tochio 栃尾市
- Former municipality
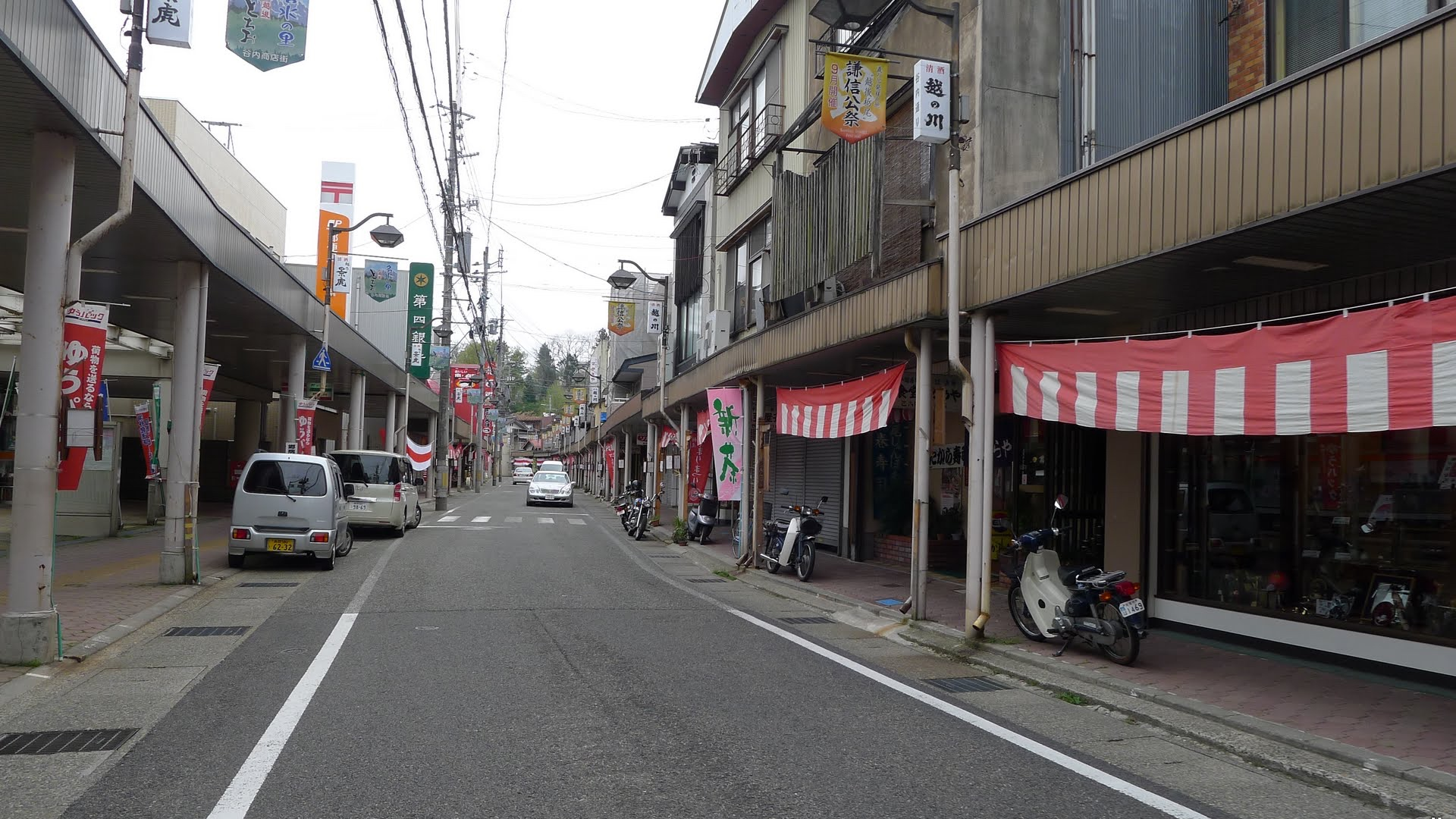
- Central Tochio

- Flag Seal
- Interactive map of Tochio
- Country: Japan
- Region: Hokuriku
- Prefecture: Niigata Prefecture
- Merged: January 1, 2006 (now part of Nagaoka)

Area
  - Total: 204.92 km^{2} (79.12 sq mi)

Population (2003)
  - Total: 23,855
- Time zone: UTC+09:00 (JST)

10 municipalities merged into Nagaoka City

Tochio (栃尾市, Tochio-shi) was a city located in Niigata Prefecture, Japan. The city was founded on June 1, 1954.

As of 2003, the city had an estimated population of 23,855 and the density of 116.41 persons per km^{2}. The total area was 204.92 km^{2}.

On January 1, 2006, Tochio lost its independent status as a city when it, along with the towns of Teradomari and Yoita, and the village of Washima (all from Santō District), was merged into the expanded city of Nagaoka.

== Transportation ==
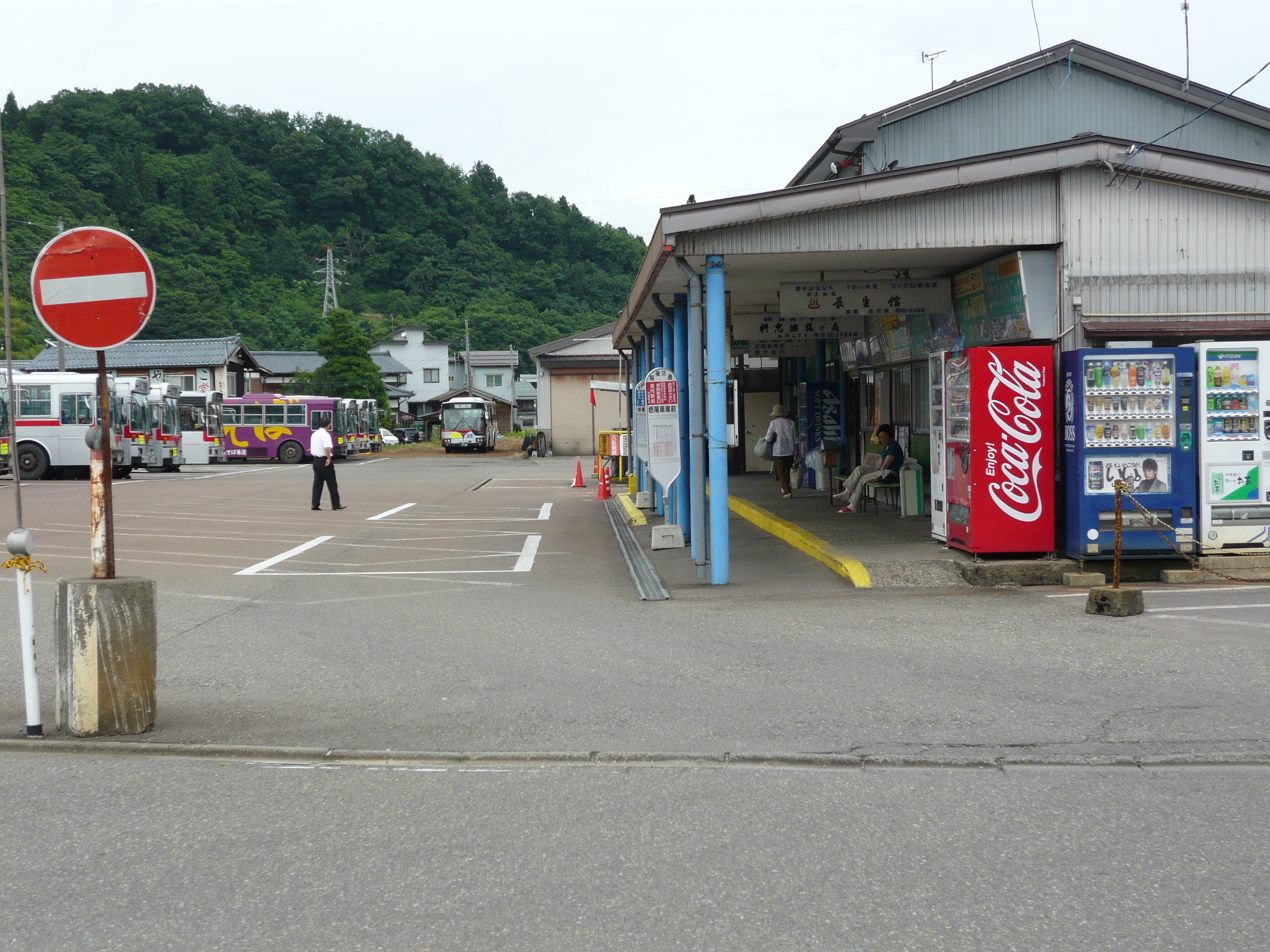
Echigo Kotsu Tochio Bus Terminal (Former Tochio Station(ja:栃尾駅))

=== Railway ===
Echigo Kotsu Tochio Line(ja:越後交通栃尾線) had been operated in the city until 1973.

=== Highway ===
- National Route 290
- National Route 351

== See also ==
Media related to Tochio, Niigata at Wikimedia Commons
