= Minami-Yoshida Station =

Railway station in Tsubame, Niigata Prefecture, Japan

Minami-Yoshida Station 南吉田駅
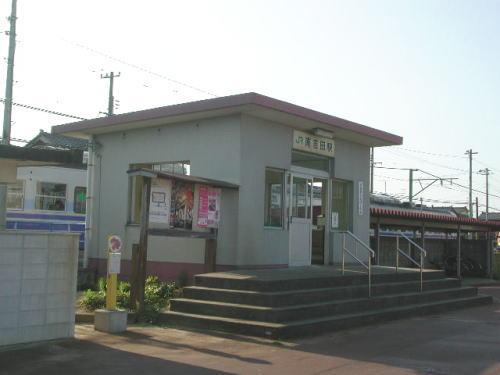
- Minami-Yoshida Station in July 2004

General information
- Location: 592 Nichi-Ota, Tsubame-shi, Niigata-ken 959-0221; Japan
- Coordinates: 37.6721°N 138.8708°E
- Operator: JR East
- Line: ■ Echigo Line
- Distance: 47.8 km from Kashiwazaki
- Platforms: 1 side platform
- Tracks: 1

Other information
- Status: Unstaffed
- Website: www.jreast.co.jp/estation/station/info.aspx?StationCd=1503

History
- Opened: 28 December 1912

Services
| Preceding station | JR East | Following station |
|---|---|---|
| Aōzu towards Kashiwazaki | Echigo Line | Yoshida towards Niigata |
Location
- Location within JR Echigo Line Location within Japan

Minami-Yoshida Station (南吉田駅, Minami-Yoshida-eki) is a railway station in the city of Tsubame, Niigata, Japan, operated by East Japan Railway Company (JR East).

== Lines ==
Minami-Yoshida Station is served by the Echigo Line, and is 47.8 kilometers from terminus of the line at Kashiwazaki.

== Station layout ==
The station consists of one ground-level side platform serving a single bi-directional track.

The station is unattended. Suica farecard cannot be used at this station.

== History ==
The station opened on 10 June 1965. With the privatization of Japanese National Railways (JNR) on 1 April 1987, the station came under the control of JR East. A new station building was completed March 2000.

== Surrounding area ==
- National Route 114
- Tsubame City Hall

== See also ==
- List of railway stations in Japan
