= Ojimaya Station =

Railway station in Nagaoka, Niigata Prefecture, Japan

Ojimaya Station 小島谷駅
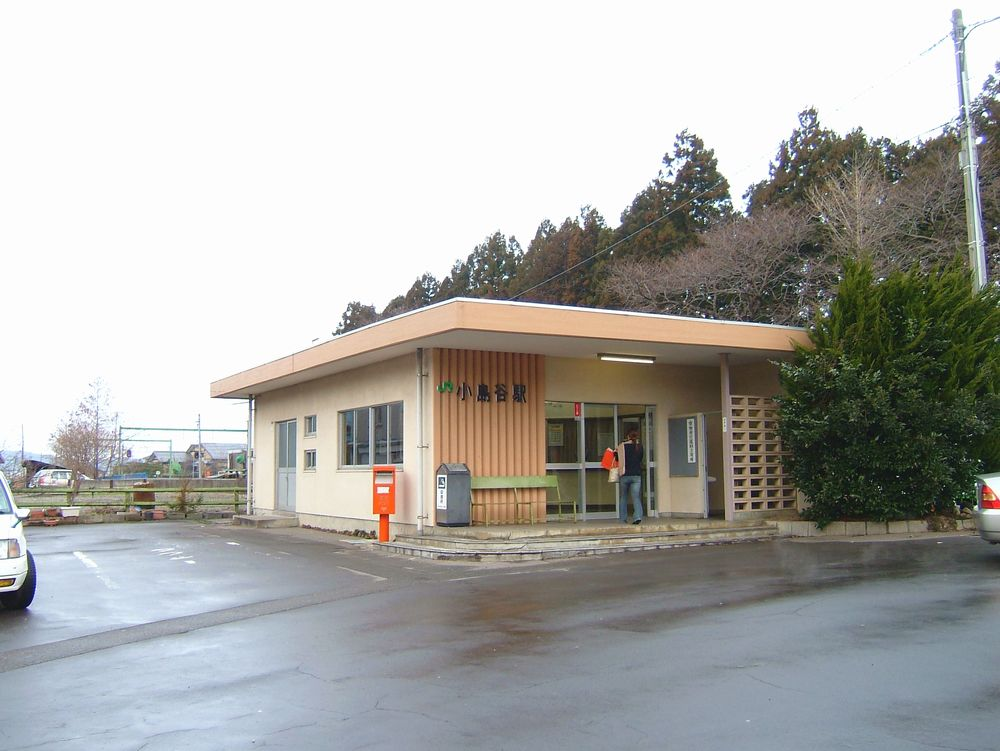
- Ojimaya Station in March 2006

General information
- Location: Ojimaya, Nagaoka-shi, Niigata-ken 949-4511; Japan
- Coordinates: 37.5744°N 138.7715°E
- Operator: JR East
- Line: ■ Echigo Line
- Distance: 32.4 km from Kashiwazaki
- Platforms: 2 side platforms
- Tracks: 2

Other information
- Status: Unstaffed
- Website: Official website

History
- Opened: 20 April 1913
- Former names: Yoita Station (to 1915)

Passengers
- FY2010: 107 daily

Services
Preceding station	JR East	Following station
Myōhōji towards Kashiwazaki	Echigo Line	Kirihara towards Niigata
Location
- Location within JR Echigo Line Location within Japan

Ojimaya Station (小島谷駅, Ojimaya-eki) is a railway station in the city of Nagaoka, Niigata Prefecture, Japan, operated by East Japan Railway Company (JR East).

== Lines ==
Ojimaya Station is served by the Echigo Line, and is 32.4 kilometers from terminus of the line at Kashiwazaki.

== Station layout ==
The station consists of two ground-level opposed side platforms serving two tracks. The platforms are connected by a footbridge.

The station is unattended. Suica farecard cannot be used at this station.

=== Platforms ===
1	■ Echigo Line	for Yoshida and Niigata for Higashi-Sanjō for Kashiwazaki
2	■ Echigo Line	for Kashiwazaki (peak times only)

== History ==
The station opened on 20 April 1913 as Yoita Station (与板駅, Yoita-eki). It was renamed to its present name on 1 October 1915. With the privatization of Japanese National Railways (JNR) on 1 April 1987, the station came under the control of JR East.

== Surrounding area ==
- Washima Post Office
- former Kashima village hall
- National Route 116

== See also ==
- List of railway stations in Japan
