= Izumozaki Station =

Railway station in Izumozaki, Niigata Prefecture, Japan

Izumozaki Station 出雲崎駅
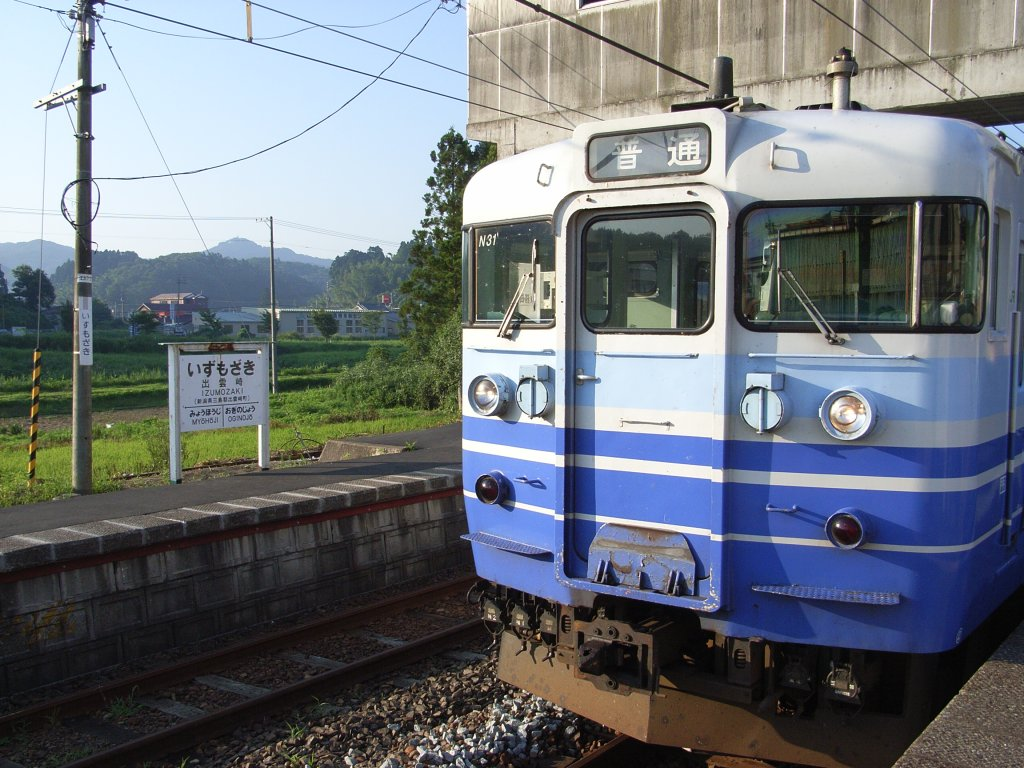
- Izumozaki Station, August 2007

General information
- Location: Daimon, Izumozaki-cho, Santō-gun, Niigata-ken 949-4352; Japan
- Coordinates: 37.5321°N 138.7163°E
- Operator: JR East
- Line: ■ Echigo Line
- Distance: 24.8 km from Kashiwazaki
- Platforms: 2 side platforms
- Tracks: 2

Other information
- Status: Staffed (Midori no Madoguchi)
- Website: Official website

History
- Opened: 28 December 1912

Passengers
- FY2017: 179 daily

Services
Preceding station	JR East	Following station
Oginojō towards Kashiwazaki	Echigo Line	Myōhōji towards Niigata
Location
- Location within JR Echigo Line Location within Japan

Izumozaki Station (出雲崎駅, Izumozaki-eki) is a railway station in the town of Izumozaki, Santō District, Niigata Prefecture, Japan, operated by East Japan Railway Company (JR East).

== Lines ==
Izumozaki Station is served by the Echigo Line and is 24.8 kilometers from the terminus of the line at Kashiwazaki Station.

== Station layout ==
The station consists of two opposed ground-level side platforms serving two tracks, connected by a footbridge.

The station has a Midori no Madoguchi staffed ticket office. Suica farecard cannot be used at this station.

== Platforms ==
1	■ Echigo Line	for Niigata for Kashiwazaki
3	■ Echigo Line	for Kashiwazaki (peak time only)

== History ==
Izumozaki Station was opened on 28 December 1912. A new station building was completed in 1981. The cargo handling center was closed in 1987. With the privatization of Japanese National Railways (JNR) on 1 April 1987, the station came under the control of JR East.

== Passenger statistics ==
In fiscal 2017, the station was used by an average of 179 passengers daily (boarding passengers only).

== Surrounding area ==
- National Route 116
- National Route 352
- Izumozaki town hall
- Izunozaki Post Office

== See also ==
- List of railway stations in Japan
