= Myōhōji Station (Niigata) =

Railway station in Nagaoka, Niigata Prefecture, Japan

Myōhōji Station 妙法寺駅
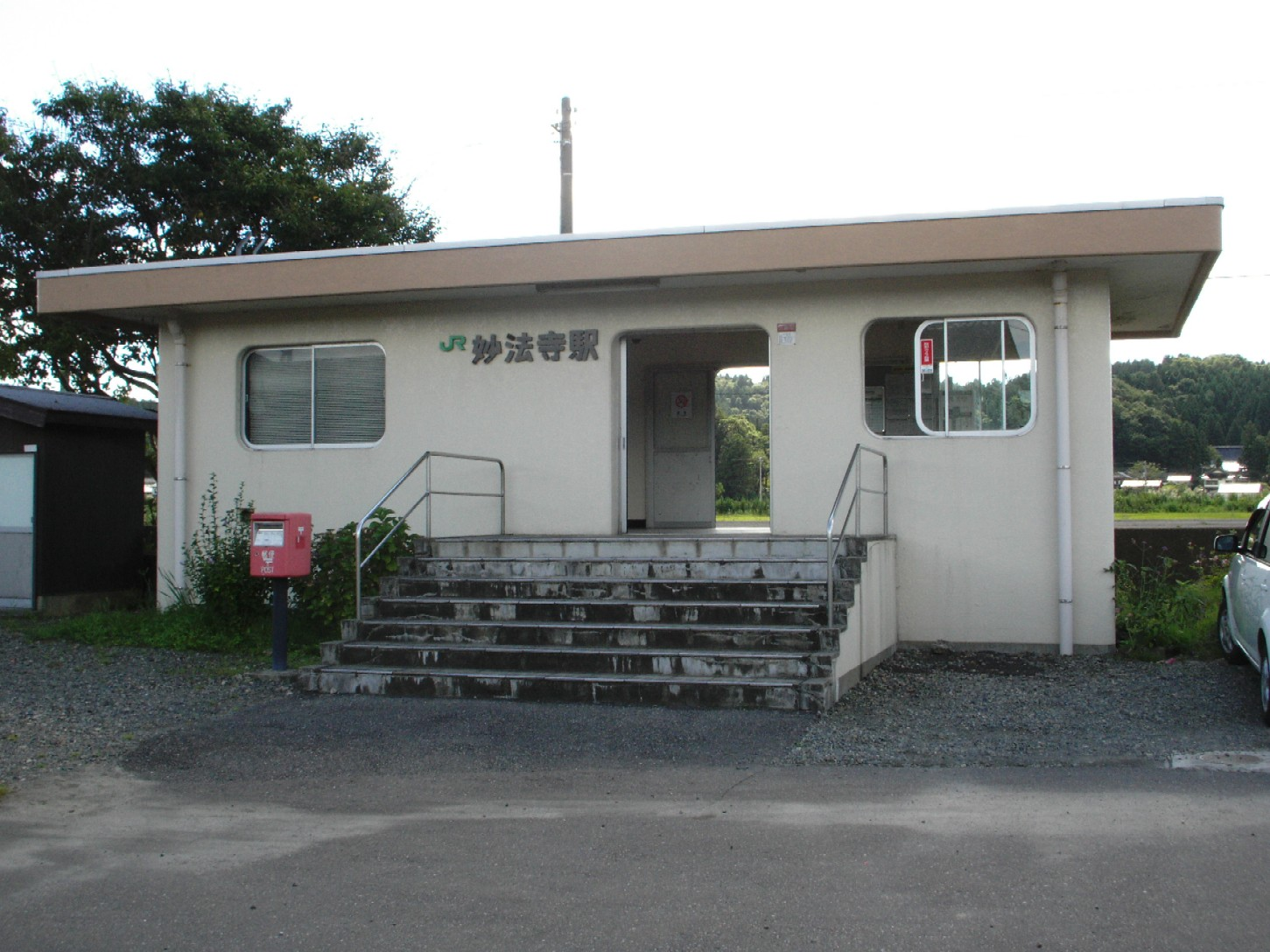
- Myōhōji Station in September 2007

General information
- Location: 544 Murata, Nagaoka-shi, Niigata-ken 949-4522; Japan
- Coordinates: 37°33′59.20″N 138°44′31.44″E
- Operator: JR East
- Line: ■ Echigo Line
- Distance: 29.4 km from Kashiwazaki
- Platforms: 1 side platform
- Tracks: 1

Other information
- Status: Unstaffed
- Website: Official website

History
- Opened: 25 September 1916

Passengers
- FY2010: 34 daily

Services
Preceding station	JR East	Following station
Izumozaki towards Kashiwazaki	Echigo Line	Ojimaya towards Niigata
Location
- Location within JR Echigo Line Location within Japan

Myōhōji Station (妙法寺駅, Myōhōji-eki) is a railway station in the city of Nagaoka, Niigata, Japan, operated by East Japan Railway Company (JR East).

== Lines ==
Myōhōji Station is served by the Echigo Line, and is 29.4 kilometers from terminus of the line at Kashiwazaki.

== Station layout ==
The station consists of one ground-level side platform serving a single bi-directional track. The station has a waiting room and toilet.

The station is unattended, and does not have ticket machines. Suica farecard cannot be used at this station.

== History ==
The station was elevated from a temporary stop on 25 September 1916. The station became part of the nationalised Echigo Line on 1 October 1927. The cargo depot was closed on 1 February 1962. A new station building was completed in December 1980. With the privatization of Japanese National Railways (JNR) on 1 April 1987, the station came under the control of JR East.

== Surrounding area ==
- National Route 116
- Murata Myōhō-ji (Nichiren-sect temple)

== See also ==
- List of railway stations in Japan
