= Echigo Line =

Railway line in Niigata prefecture, Japan

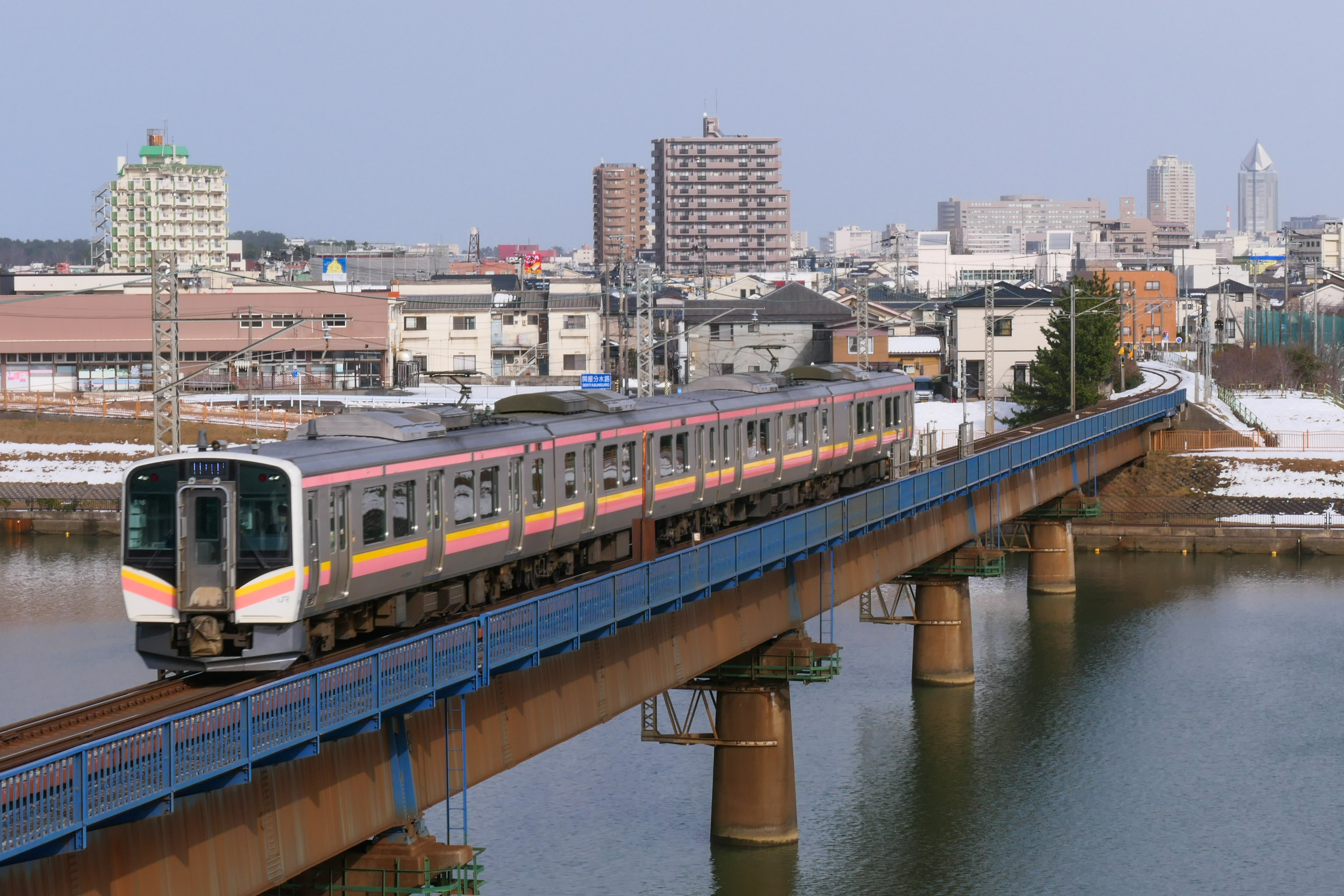
- An E129 series EMU between Aoyama and Sekiya stations

Overview
- Native name: 越後線
- Status: In operation
- Owner: JR East
- Locale: Niigata Prefecture
- Termini: Kashiwazaki; Niigata
- Stations: 33

Service
- Type: Heavy rail
- Operator(s): JR East

History
- Opened: 1912; 114 years ago

Technical
- Line length: 83.8 km (52.1 mi)
- Track gauge: 1,067 mm (3 ft 6 in)
- Electrification: 1,500 V DC overhead catenary
- Operating speed: 85 km/h (53 mph)
Route map

The Echigo Line (越後線, Echigo-sen) is a railway line operated by East Japan Railway Company (JR East) which connects the cities of Kashiwazaki and Niigata in Niigata Prefecture, Japan. The line's name is taken from the name of the ancient Echigo Province, which corresponds to most of modern-day Niigata Prefecture.

== History ==
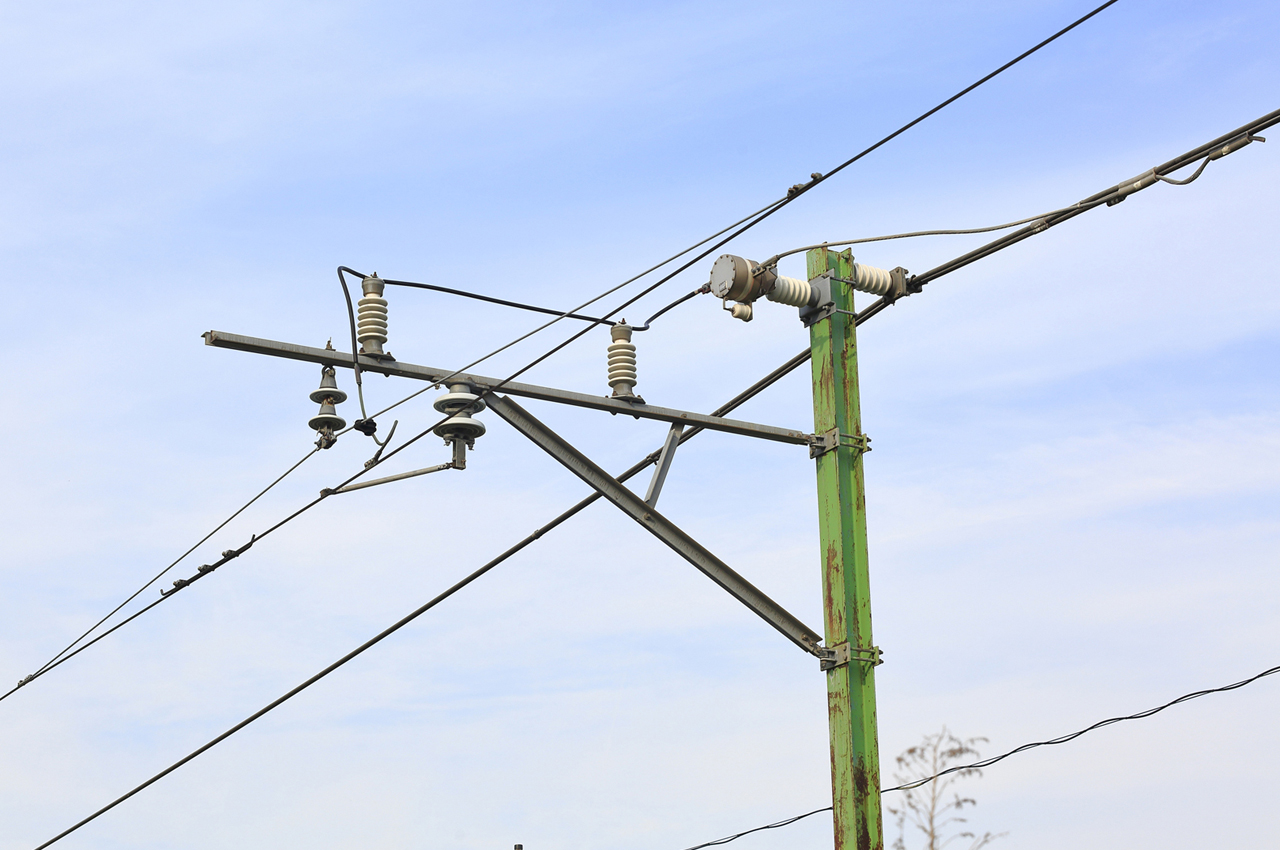
An overhead line of Echigo Line (between Izumozaki and Myōhōji)

The Echigo Railway Co. opened the Hakusan - Kashiwazaki section of the line in 1912, and was nationalised in 1927. In 1951, the Hakusan - Niigata section was opened, CTC signalling was commissioned in 1982, the line was electrified at 1,500 V DC in 1984, and freight services ceased in 1987.

A new station, Kamitokoro Station, opened on 15 March 2025. This station was built on the section between Niigata and Hakusan stations, becoming the first new station on the line and in Niigata Prefecture (except Shinkansen) since Uchino-Nishigaoka was opened in 2005.

=== Former connecting lines ===
- Teradomari Station: The Nagaoka Railway Co. opened a 39 km (24 mi) line to Raikoji (on the Shin'etsu Line) between 1915 and 1921. This company introduced Japan's first diesel railcar in 1928, and in 1951 electrified 31 km (19 mi) of the line at 750 V DC in 70 days, completing the balance the following year. Significant typhoon damage occurred in 1966, and in 1972, passenger services ceased between Raikoji and Nishinagaoka, with the entire line becoming freight-only three years later. The line closed in 1995.
- Sekiya Station: The Niigata Kotsu Co. opened a 34 km (21 mi) line, electrified at 1,500 V DC, to Tsubame on the Yahiko Line between 1933 and 1934. Freight services ceased in 1982, and the line closed between 1993 and 1999.

== Services ==
Stations of Echigo Line

Although most services are operated to and from Niigata Station, operations are divided into two sections: Kashiwazaki – Yoshida and Yoshida – Niigata. Some services operate over the entire line and through to Niitsu on the Shinetsu Main Line, Shibata on the Hakushin Line, or Higashi-Sanjō on the Yahiko Line.

Between Kashiwazaki and Yoshida, there is a period of over three hours where no trains operate. Between Niigata and Uchino there are three trains per hour, with another one to two trains per hour to Yoshida.

== Station list ==
- All stations are located within Niigata Prefecture.
- Trains can pass each other at stations marked "∥", "◇", "∨", and "∧"; they cannot pass at stations marked "｜".

| Station | Japanese | Distance (km) | | Transfers | | Location |
| Station | Japanese | Between stations | Total | Transfers | | Location |
|---|---|---|---|---|---|---|
| Kashiwazaki | 柏崎 | - | 0.0 | ■Shinetsu Main Line | ∨ | Kashiwazaki |
| Higashi-Kashiwazaki | 東柏崎 | 1.6 | 1.6 | | ｜ | Kashiwazaki |
| Nishi-Nakadōri | 西中通 | 3.4 | 5.0 | | ｜ | Kashiwazaki |
| Arahama | 荒浜 | 1.6 | 6.6 | | ｜ | Kariwa, Kariwa District |
| Kariwa | 刈羽 | 3.3 | 9.9 | | ｜ | Kariwa, Kariwa District |
| Nishiyama | 西山 | 2.9 | 12.8 | | ◇ | Kashiwazaki |
| Raihai | 礼拝 | 2.2 | 15.0 | | ｜ | Kashiwazaki |
| Ishiji | 石地 | 3.7 | 18.7 | | ｜ | Kashiwazaki |
| Oginojō | 小木ノ城 | 4.0 | 22.7 | | ｜ | Izumozaki, Santō District |
| Izumozaki | 出雲崎 | 2.1 | 24.8 | | ◇ | Izumozaki, Santō District |
| Myōhōji | 妙法寺 | 4.6 | 29.4 | | ｜ | Nagaoka |
| Ojimaya | 小島谷 | 3.0 | 32.4 | | ◇ | Nagaoka |
| Kirihara | 桐原 | 3.8 | 36.2 | | ｜ | Nagaoka |
| Teradomari | 寺泊 | 2.8 | 39.0 | | ◇ | Nagaoka |
| Bunsui | 分水 | 2.5 | 41.5 | | ◇ | Tsubame |
| Aouzu | 粟生津 | 4.3 | 45.8 | | ｜ | Tsubame |
| Minami-Yoshida | 南吉田 | 2.0 | 47.8 | | ｜ | Tsubame |
| Yoshida | 吉田 | 2.0 | 49.8 | ■Yahiko Line | ◇ | Tsubame |
| Kita-Yoshida | 北吉田 | 1.9 | 51.7 | | ｜ | Tsubame |
| Iwamuro | 岩室 | 2.1 | 53.8 | | ｜ | Nishikan-ku, Niigata |
| Maki | 巻 | 4.0 | 57.8 | | ◇ | Nishikan-ku, Niigata |
| Echigo-Sone | 越後曽根 | 4.6 | 62.4 | | ◇ | Nishikan-ku, Niigata |
| Echigo-Akatsuka | 越後赤塚 | 2.5 | 64.9 | | ◇ | Nishi-ku, Niigata |
| Uchino-Nishigaoka | 内野西が丘 | 3.8 | 68.7 | | ｜ | Nishi-ku, Niigata |
| Uchino | 内野 | 1.6 | 70.3 | | ◇ | Nishi-ku, Niigata |
| Niigata University | 新潟大学前 | 2.0 | 72.3 | | ｜ | Nishi-ku, Niigata |
| Terao | 寺尾 | 2.1 | 74.4 | | ◇ | Nishi-ku, Niigata |
| Kobari | 小針 | 1.9 | 76.3 | | ◇ | Nishi-ku, Niigata |
| Aoyama | 青山 | 1.4 | 77.7 | | ｜ | Nishi-ku, Niigata |
| Sekiya | 関屋 | 1.5 | 79.2 | | ◇ | Chūō-ku, Niigata |
| Hakusan | 白山 | 1.5 | 80.7 | | ◇ | Chūō-ku, Niigata |
| Kamitokoro | 上所 | 1.6 | 82.3 | | ∧ | Chūō-ku, Niigata |
| Niigata | 新潟 | 1.5 | 83.8 | Jōetsu Shinkansen; ■Shinetsu Main Line; ■Hakushin Line; ■Banetsu West Line (Note: Although the official start of the Banetsu West Line is at Niitsu, some trains travel through via the Shinetsu Main Line to Niigata.) | ∥ | Chūō-ku, Niigata |

== Rolling stock ==
- E129 series 2/4-car EMUs (since December 2014)
Operations in Niigata area

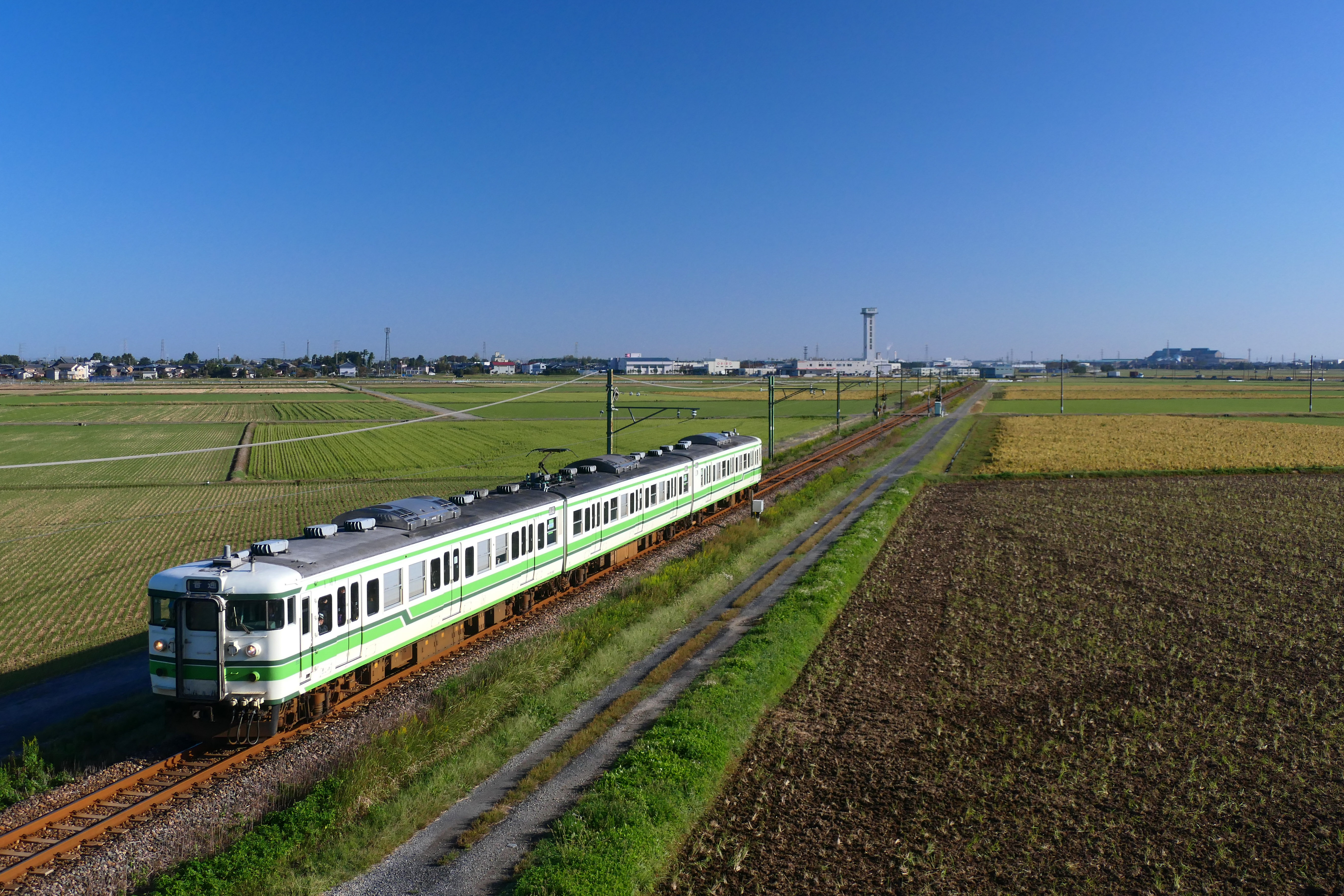
115 series EMU (Aōzu - Bunsui, October 2019)

=== Previous ===
- 115 series 3-car EMUs (until March 2022)
- 165 series
- E127 series 2-car EMUs (Yoshida - Niigata) (until March 2022)
