= Japan National Route 402 =

Road in Niigata prefecture, Japan

National Route 402
- 国道402号

Route information
- Length: 89 km (55 mi)
- Existed: 1982–present

Location
- Country: Japan

Highway system
- National highways of Japan; Expressways of Japan
← National Route 401	→ National Route 403

National Route 402 is a national highway of Japan connecting Kashiwazaki, Niigata and Chūō-ku, Niigata in Japan, with a total length of 89 km (55.3 mi).
