= Uchino Station =

Railway station in Niigata, Japan

Uchino Station 内野駅
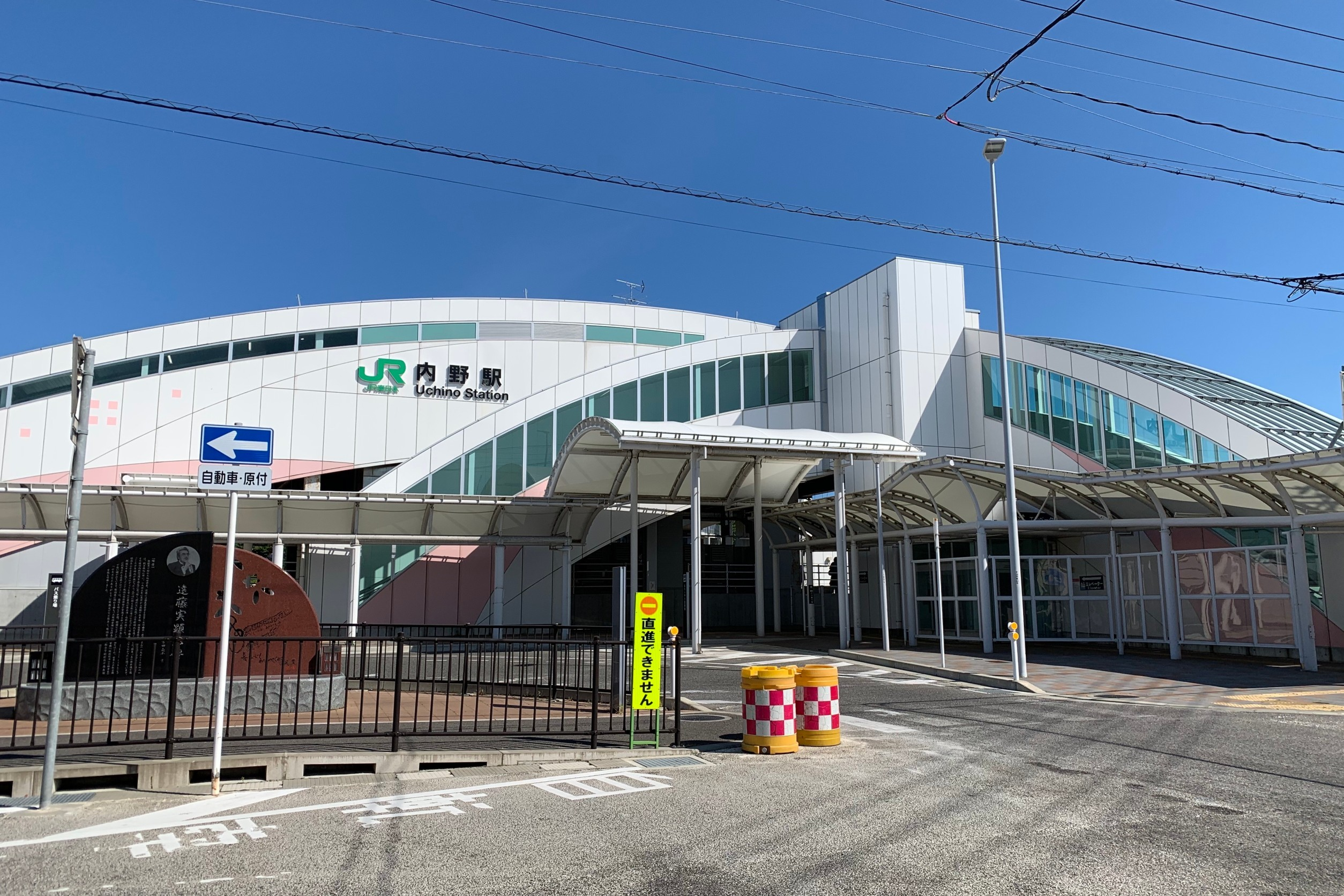
- South side of Uchino Station, June 2020

General information
- Location: Uchino, Nishi-ku, Niigata-shi, Niigata-ken 950-2112; Japan
- Coordinates: 37.8585°N 138.9366°E
- Operator: JR East
- Line: ■ Echigo Line
- Distance: 70.3 km from Kashiwazaki
- Platforms: 2 side platforms

Other information
- Status: Staffed ("Midori no Madoguchi" )
- Website: Official website

History
- Opened: 25 August 1912

Passengers
- FY2017: 2,655 daily

Services
Preceding station	JR East	Following station
Uchino-Nishigaoka towards Kashiwazaki	Echigo Line	Niigata University towards Niigata
Location
- Location within JR Echigo Line Location within Japan

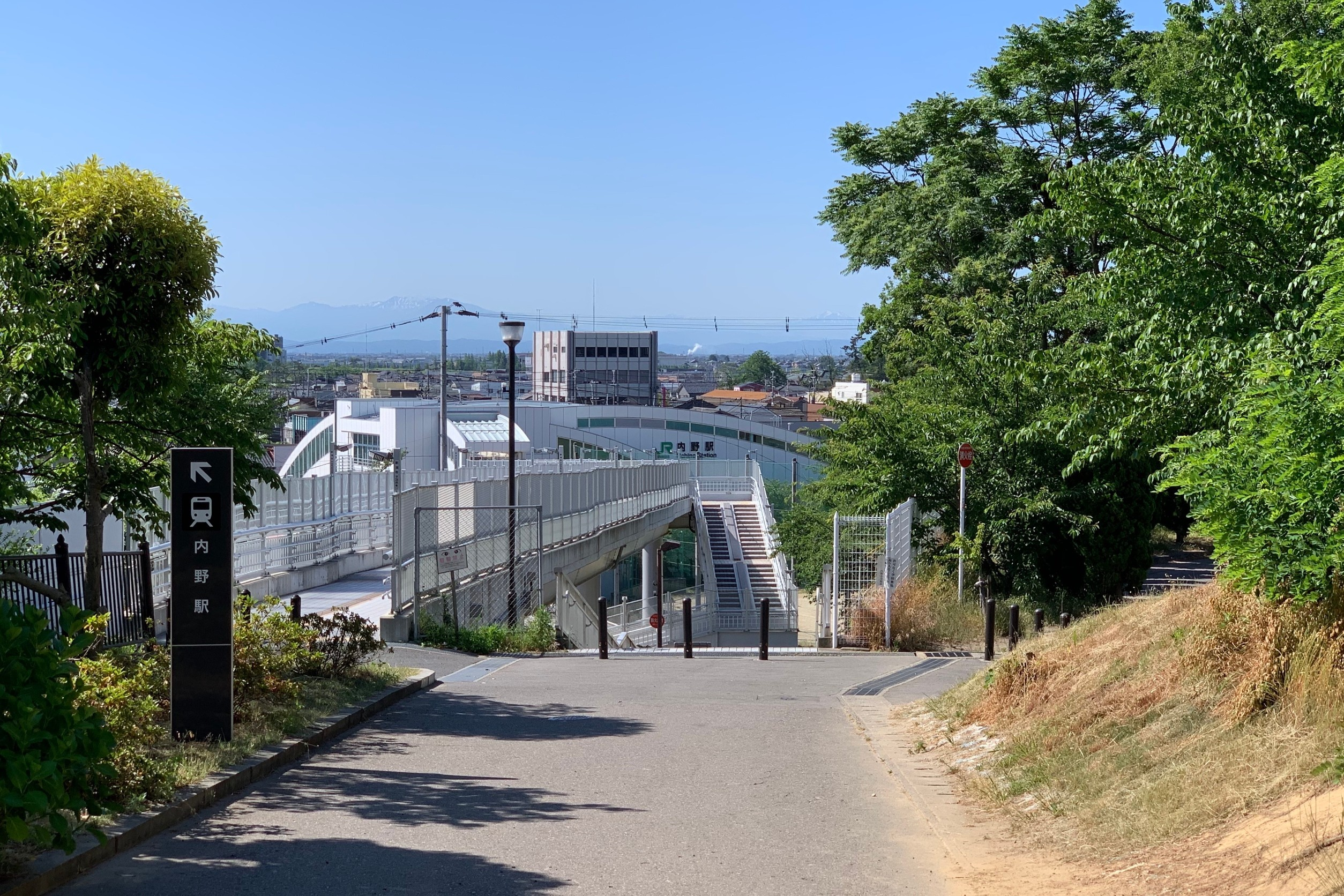
North side of Uchino Station, June 2020

Uchino Station (内野駅, Uchino-eki) is a railway station on the Echigo Line in Nishi-ku, Niigata, Niigata Prefecture, Japan, operated by East Japan Railway Company (JR East).

== Lines ==
Uchino Station is served by the Echigo Line, and is 70.3 kilometers from terminus of the line at Kashiwazaki.

== Station layout ==
The station consists of two ground-level opposed side platforms, with an elevated station situated above the tracks.

The station has a "Midori no Madoguchi" staffed ticket office. Suica farecard can be used at this station.

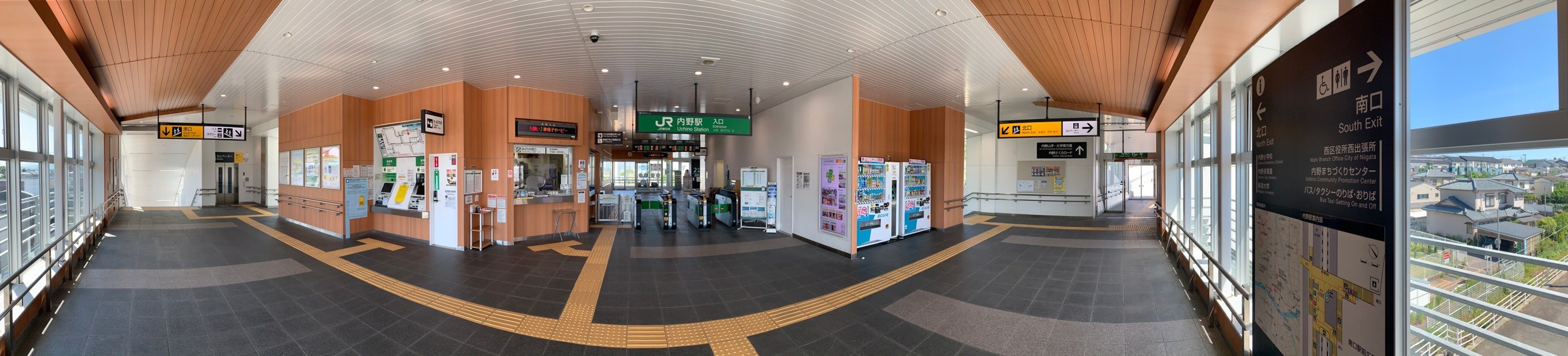
Station interior, June 2020

=== Platforms ===
1	■ Echigo Line	for Yoshida and Kashiwazaki
2	■ Echigo Line	for Niigata

== History ==
The station opened on 25 August 1912. With the privatization of JNR on 1 April 1987, the station came under the control of JR East.

== Passenger statistics ==
In fiscal 2017, the station was used by an average of 2655 passengers daily (boarding passengers only).

== Culture and historical site ==
In March 2017, a monument in honor of composer Minoru Endo was erected in the plaza in front of Uchino Station in Nishi-ku, Niigata City. Songs by Minoru Endo can be played.

== Surrounding area ==
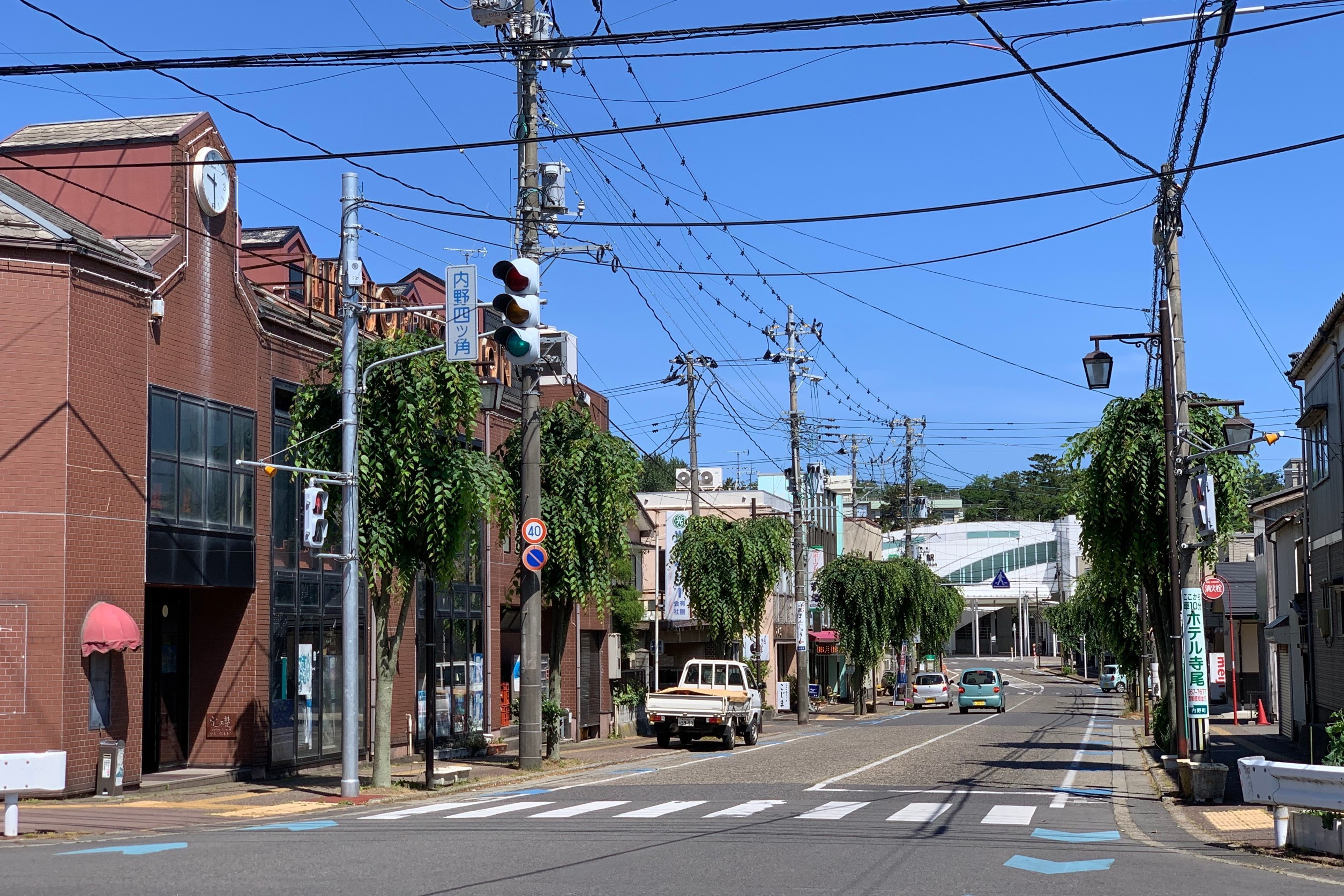
View from south side of the station

- Niigata University
- Uchino Elementary School
- Uchino Middle School

== See also ==
- List of railway stations in Japan
