= Kashiwazaki, Niigata =

Kashiwazaki 柏崎市
- City
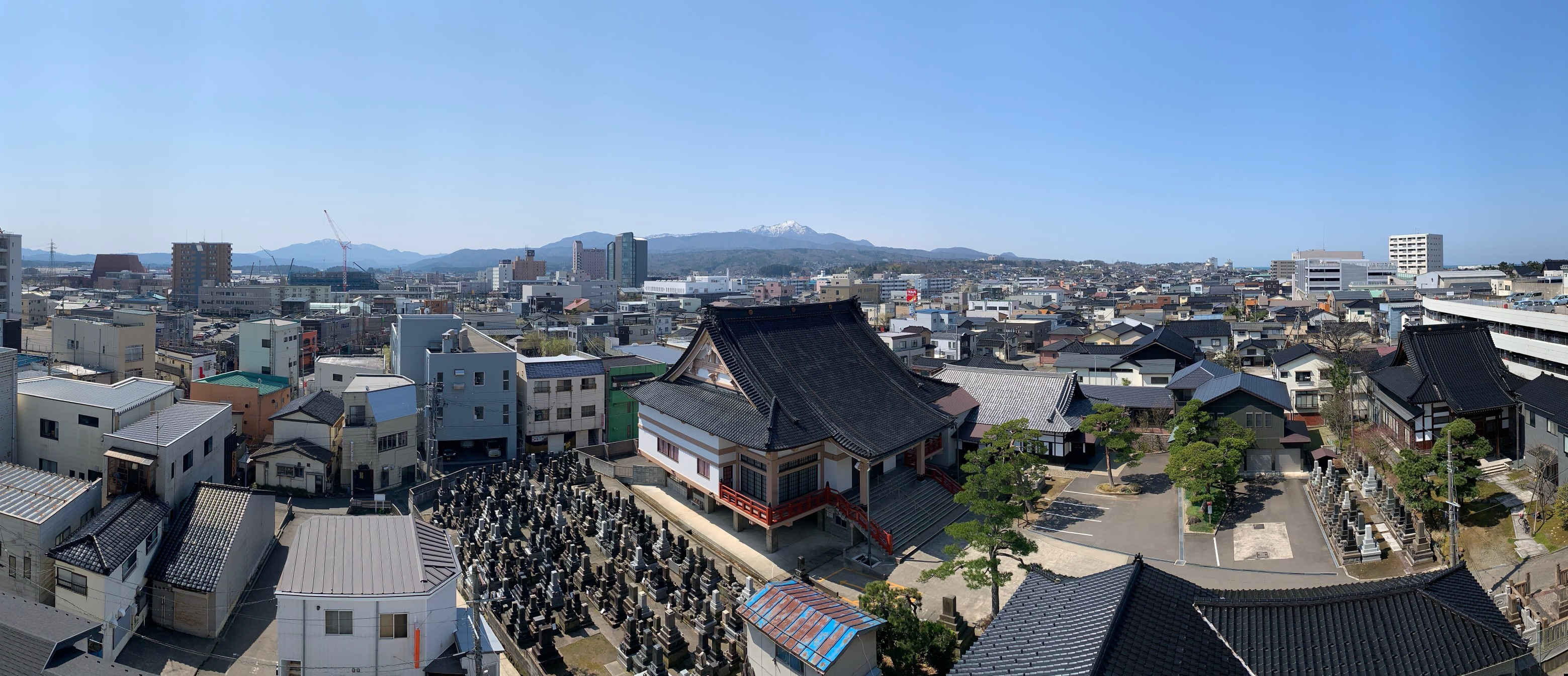
- View from Shopping Mall Fonjie

- Flag Seal

- Location of Kashiwazaki in Niigata

- Coordinates: 37°22′18.9″N 138°33′32.4″E
- Country: Japan
- Region: Chūbu (Kōshin'etsu) (Hokuriku)
- Prefecture: Niigata

Government
  - Mayor: Masahiro Sakurai

Area
  - Total: 442.03 km^{2} (170.67 sq mi)

Population (November 30, 2020)
  - Total: 81,836
  - Density: 185.14/km^{2} (479.50/sq mi)
- Time zone: UTC+9 (Japan Standard Time)
- Phone number: 0257-23-5111
- Address: 5-50, Chūōchō, Kashiwazaki-shi, Niigata-ken 945-8511
- Climate: Cfa
- Website: Official website
- Symbols
- Bird: Swan
- Flower: Lilium auratum
- Tree: Sakura

Kashiwazaki (柏崎市, Kashiwazaki-shi) is a city located in Niigata Prefecture, Japan. As of November 30, 2020, the city had an estimated population of 81,836 in 34,883 households, and a population density of 187 persons per km^{2}. The total area of the city was 442.03 square kilometres (170.67 sq mi).

== Geography ==
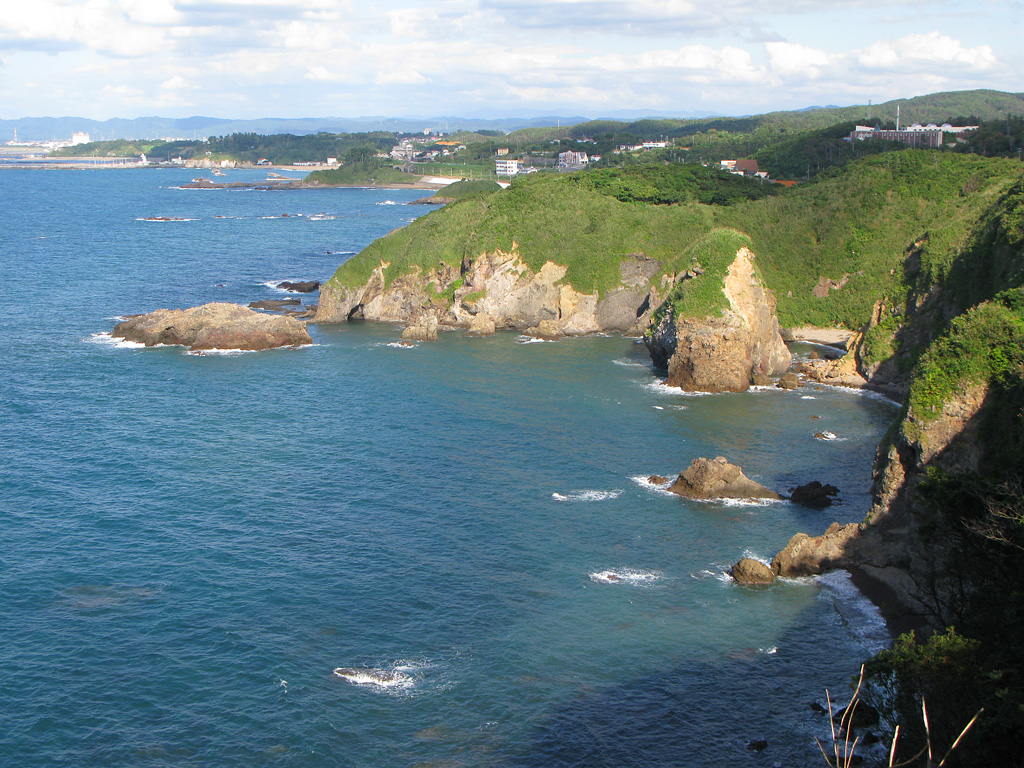
Fukuura Coast

Kashiwazaki is located in a coastal region of south-central Niigata Prefecture. Part of the city is within the borders of the Sado-Yahiko-Yoneyama Quasi-National Park. The highest elevation is the summit of Mount Gozu at 912 meters.

=== Surrounding municipalities ===
- Niigata Prefecture
  - Izumozaki
  - Jōetsu
  - Kariwa
  - Nagaoka
  - Tōkamachi

=== Climate ===
Kashiwazaki has a humid subtropical climate (Köppen Cfa) characterized by warm, wet summers and cold winters with heavy snowfall. The average annual temperature in Kashiwazaki is 13.5 °C (56.3 °F). The average annual rainfall is 2,411.3 mm (94.93 in) with December as the wettest month. The temperatures are highest on average in August, at around 25.7 °C (78.3 °F), and lowest in February, at around 2.9 °C (37.2 °F).

Climate data for Kashiwazaki, elevation 7 m (23 ft), (1991−2020 normals, extremes 1978−present)
Month	Jan	Feb	Mar	Apr	May	Jun	Jul	Aug	Sep	Oct	Nov	Dec	Year
Record high °C (°F)	18.0 (64.4)	22.6 (72.7)	27.1 (80.8)	30.8 (87.4)	32.6 (90.7)	36.1 (97.0)	37.0 (98.6)	38.8 (101.8)	37.0 (98.6)	35.1 (95.2)	27.1 (80.8)	22.4 (72.3)	38.8 (101.8)
Mean daily maximum °C (°F)	6.3 (43.3)	6.7 (44.1)	10.1 (50.2)	15.9 (60.6)	21.1 (70.0)	24.3 (75.7)	28.3 (82.9)	30.1 (86.2)	26.3 (79.3)	20.8 (69.4)	15.1 (59.2)	9.4 (48.9)	17.9 (64.2)
Daily mean °C (°F)	3.0 (37.4)	2.9 (37.2)	5.5 (41.9)	10.8 (51.4)	16.1 (61.0)	20.2 (68.4)	24.3 (75.7)	25.7 (78.3)	21.7 (71.1)	15.9 (60.6)	10.2 (50.4)	5.5 (41.9)	13.5 (56.3)
Mean daily minimum °C (°F)	−0.2 (31.6)	−0.8 (30.6)	1.0 (33.8)	5.4 (41.7)	11.1 (52.0)	16.3 (61.3)	20.9 (69.6)	21.7 (71.1)	17.7 (63.9)	11.6 (52.9)	5.8 (42.4)	1.9 (35.4)	9.4 (48.9)
Record low °C (°F)	−9.9 (14.2)	−11.3 (11.7)	−8.7 (16.3)	−5.2 (22.6)	2.8 (37.0)	7.9 (46.2)	12.7 (54.9)	13.5 (56.3)	6.9 (44.4)	2.0 (35.6)	−1.9 (28.6)	−8.1 (17.4)	−11.3 (11.7)
Average precipitation mm (inches)	288.4 (11.35)	169.3 (6.67)	148.6 (5.85)	109.1 (4.30)	100.9 (3.97)	140.6 (5.54)	221.5 (8.72)	176.4 (6.94)	180.5 (7.11)	198.7 (7.82)	321.0 (12.64)	356.2 (14.02)	2,411.3 (94.93)
Average snowfall cm (inches)	123 (48)	108 (43)	24 (9.4)	1 (0.4)	0 (0)	0 (0)	0 (0)	0 (0)	0 (0)	0 (0)	0 (0)	34 (13)	290 (114)
Average extreme snow depth cm (inches)	42 (17)	38 (15)	14 (5.5)	0 (0)	0 (0)	0 (0)	0 (0)	0 (0)	0 (0)	0 (0)	0 (0)	15 (5.9)	51 (20)
Average precipitation days (≥ 1.0 mm)	25.7	20.3	18.5	13.0	10.8	11.1	13.4	11.3	13.9	15.0	20.1	24.5	197.6
Average snowy days (≥ 3 cm)	11.7	11.0	2.7	0.1	0	0	0	0	0	0	0	3.9	29.4
Mean monthly sunshine hours	38.9	63.9	126.1	184.1	212.4	170.6	167.2	216.1	147.9	133.1	91.5	52.5	1,601.6
Source: Japan Meteorological Agency

== Demographics ==
Per Japanese census data, the population of Kashiwazaki has been declining for the past 30 years.

Historical population
Year	Pop.	±%
1960	108,331	—
1970	94,990	−12.3%
1980	95,892	+0.9%
1990	99,265	+3.5%
2000	97,896	−1.4%
2010	91,451	−6.6%
2020	81,526	−10.9%

== History ==
The area of present-day Kashiwazaki was part of ancient Echigo Province and developed as a post station on the Hokuriku-dō highway. Under the Tokugawa shogunate of Edo period Japan, parts of what is now Kashiwazaki were under the control of Shiiya Domain, a minor fudai feudal domain ruled by a junior branch of the Hori clan, while other parts were tenryō territory under direct control of the shogunate, or were exclaves of Kuwana Domain (Ise Province), Kaminoyama Domain (Mutsu Province), Nagaoka Domain (Echigo Province) or Yoita Domain (Echigo Province). Pre-modern Kashiwazaki was located within the holdings of Kuwana Domain. The modern town of Kashiwazaki was established on April 1, 1889, within Kariwa District, Niigata with the establishment of the municipalities system. During the Meiji period, the discovery of petroleum in the area led to an economic boom and increase in population. Kashiwazaki was elevated to city status on 1 July 1940. (It was the fifth city created within Niigata Prefecture).

On November 1, 1968, Kashiwaza absorbed the village of Kurohime, followed by the town of Kitajō on May 1, 1971 (both from Kariwa District). The city annexed part of the town of Kakizaki (from Nakakubiki District) on April 1, 1989 and the towns of Nishiyama and Takayanagi (both from Kariwa District) on May 1, 2005.

=== 2007 earthquake ===
On July 16, 2007, a magnitude 6.8 earthquake hit off the coast of Kashiwazaki, killing 11 people, and injuring more than 700, causing massive power outages, a tsunami warning, and other disasters. The quake forced the Kashiwazaki-Kariwa Nuclear Power Plant to shut down for 10 months as of May 2008.

== Government ==
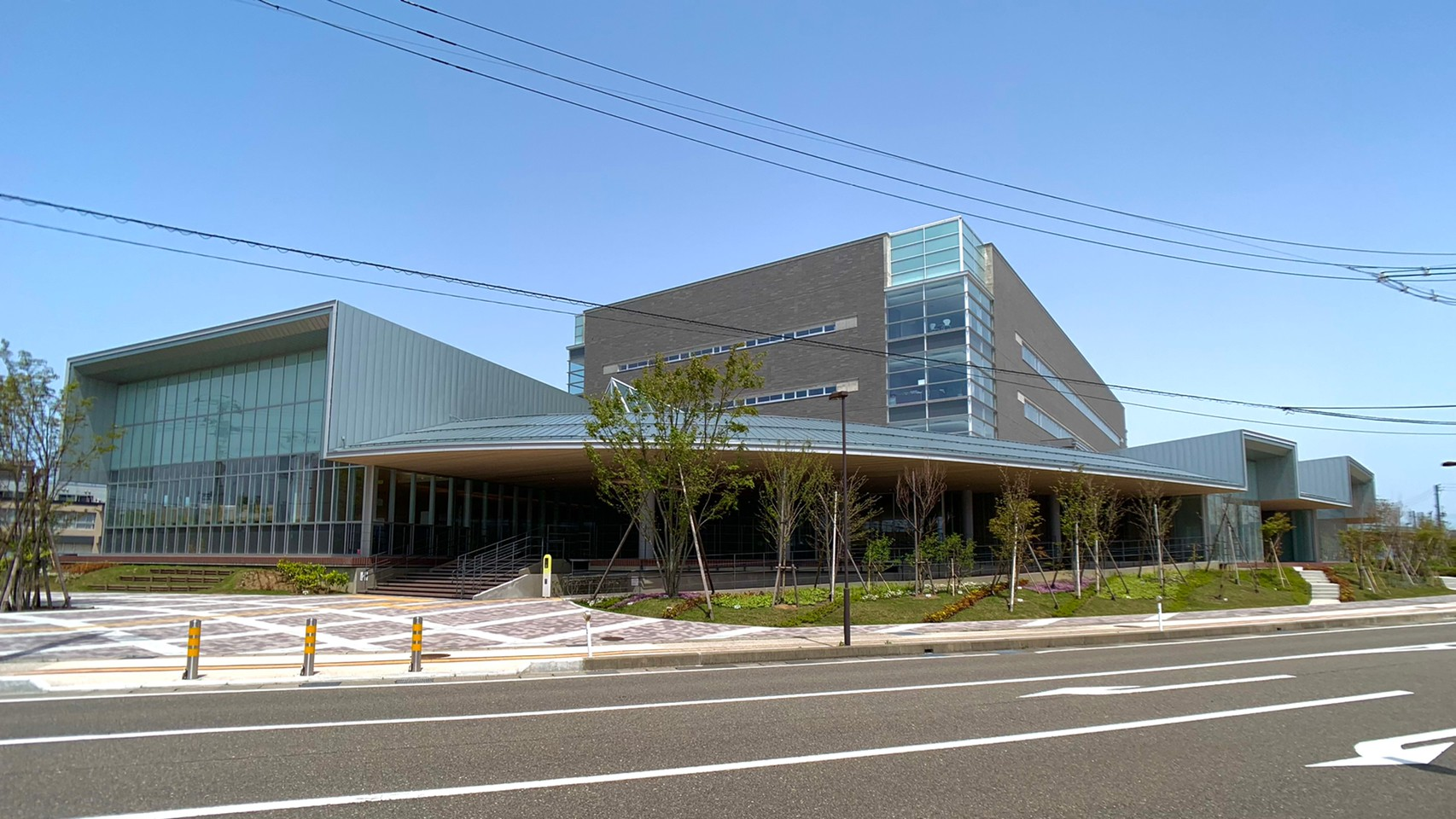
Kashiwazaki City Hall

Kashiwazaki has a mayor-council form of government with a directly elected mayor and a unicameral city legislature of 26 members. The city contributes two members to the Niigata Prefectural Assembly. In terms of national politics, the city is part of Niigata 2nd district of the lower house of the Diet of Japan.

== Economy ==
Kashiwazaki has traditionally been a center for commercial fishing, machinery, glassware and lumber processing. The city is home to the Kashiwazaki-Kariwa nuclear power plant, the largest nuclear generating station in the world by net electrical power rating.

Bourbon, a major confectionery company in Japan, is headquartered in Kashiwazaki.

== Education ==
=== Colleges and universities ===
- Niigata Institute of Technology
- Niigata Sangyo University

=== Primary and secondary education ===
Kashiwazaki has 27 public elementary schools and 12 public middle schools operated by the city. There are five public high schools operated by the Niigata Prefectural Board of Education. The prefecture also operates two special education schools for the handicapped.

== Transportation ==
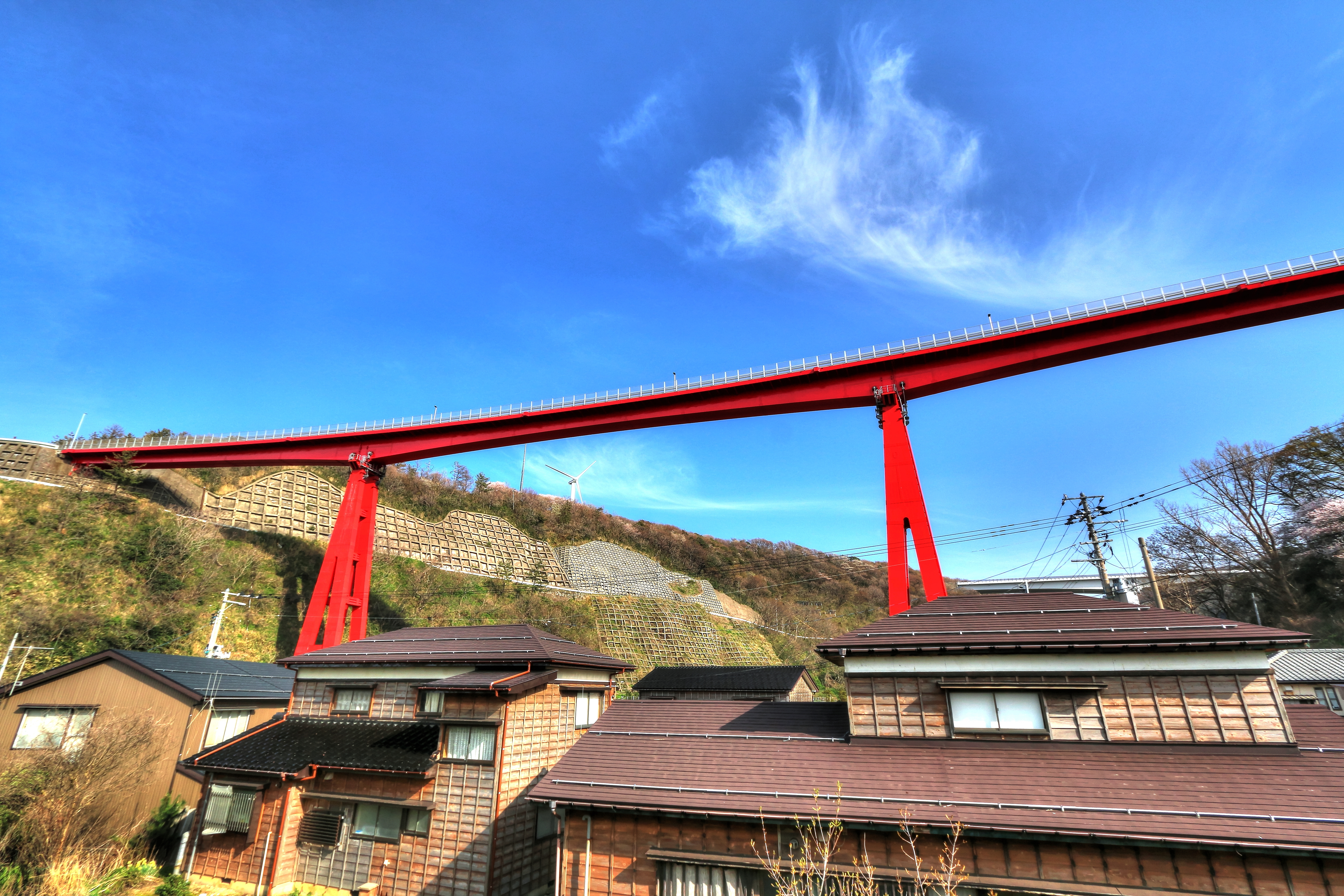
Yoneyama Ōhashi Bridge

=== Railway ===
JR East - Echigo Line

- Kashiwazaki - Higashi-Kashiwazaki - Nishi-Nakadōri - Arahama - Kariwa - Nishiyama - Raihai - Ishiji

JR East - Shin'etsu Main Line

- Yoneyama - Kasashima - Ōmigawa - Kujiranami - Kashiwazaki - Ibarame - Yasuda - Kitajō - Echigo-Hirota - Nagatori

=== Highway ===
- Hokuriku Expressway – Yoneyama IC, Kashiwazaki IC, Nishiyama IC
- National Route 8
- National Route 116
- National Route 252
- National Route 291
- National Route 352
- National Route 353
- National Route 460

== Sister cities ==
- Emeishan City, Sichuan, China, friendship city since August 2, 1994

== Local attractions ==
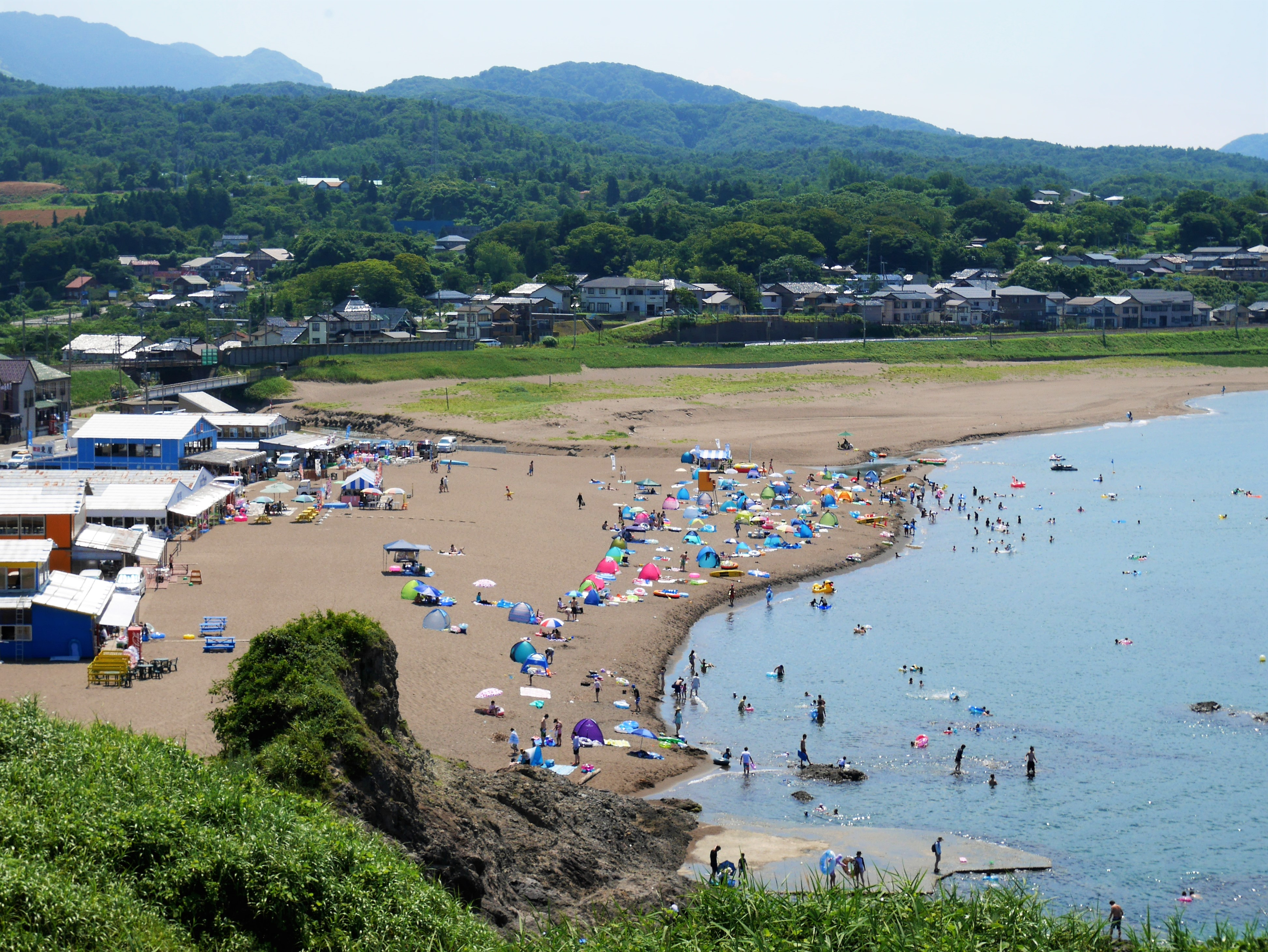
Kujiranami Beach

- Shimoyachi Site, a National Historic Site.
- Kashiwazaki is host to many cultural events every year, including the Kaze no Jin festival in May, En Ma Ichi in June, DonGALA in July, and Gion, also in July.

== Notable people from Kashiwazaki ==
- Ikuo Hirayama, former governor of Niigata Prefecture
- Akira Kurogane, professional wrestler
- Tsunesaburo Makiguchi, first president of Sōka Gakkai
- Mihiro, singer and actress
- Makoto Ogawa, singer (former member of Morning Musume)
- Ikue Ōtani, actress
- Daisuke Sakaguchi, voice actor
- Motoei Shinzawa, manga artist
- Kakuei Tanaka, politician and the 64th and 65th Prime Minister of Japan
- Makiko Tanaka, politician
- Hiroki Yagami, manga artist
- Akiko Yajima, voice actress
