= Yasuda Station (Niigata) =

Railway station in Kashiwazaki, Niigata Prefecture, Japan

Yasuda Station 安田駅
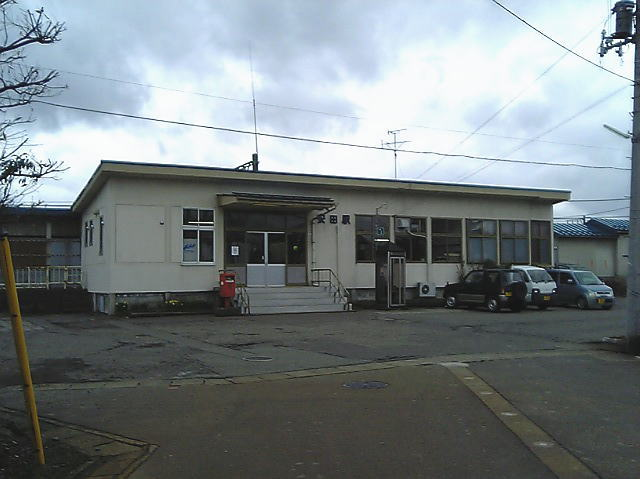
- Yasuda Station, April 2006

General information
- Location: 1725-1 Yasuda, Kashiwazaki-shi, Niigata-ken 945-1352; Japan
- Coordinates: 37°20′28″N 138°36′44″E
- Operator: JR East
- Line: ■ Shin'etsu Main Line
- Distance: 42.2 km to Naoetsu
- Platforms: 2 side platforms

Other information
- Status: Unstaffed
- Website: Official website

History
- Opened: 10 December 1899; 126 years ago

Passengers
- 344 (FY2017)

Services
Preceding station	JR East	Following station
Ibarame towards Naoetsu	Shin'etsu Main Line Local	Kitajō towards Niigata
Location
- Location within JR Shinetsu Main Line Location within Japan

Yasuda Station (安田駅, Yasuda-eki) is a railway station in the city of Kashiwazaki, Niigata, Japan, operated by East Japan Railway Company (JR East).

== Lines ==
Yasuda Station is served by the Shin'etsu Main Line and is 42.2 kilometers from the terminus of the line at Naoetsu.

== Station layout ==
The station consists of two ground-level opposed side platforms connected by a footbridge, serving two tracks. The station is unattended.

=== Platforms ===
1	■ Shin'etsu Main Line	for Nagaoka and Niigata
2	■ Shin'etsu Main Line	for Naoetsu and Kashiwazaki

== History ==
Yasuda Station opened on 10 December 1899. With the privatization of Japanese National Railways (JNR) on 1 April 1987, the station came under the control of JR East.

== Passenger statistics ==
In fiscal 2017, the station was used by an average of 344 passengers daily (boarding passengers only).

== Surrounding area ==
- National Route 252
- Niigata Sangyo University

== See also ==
- List of railway stations in Japan
