= Nishiyama Station (Niigata) =

Railway station in Kashiwazaki, Niigata prefecture, Japan

Nishiyama Station 西山駅
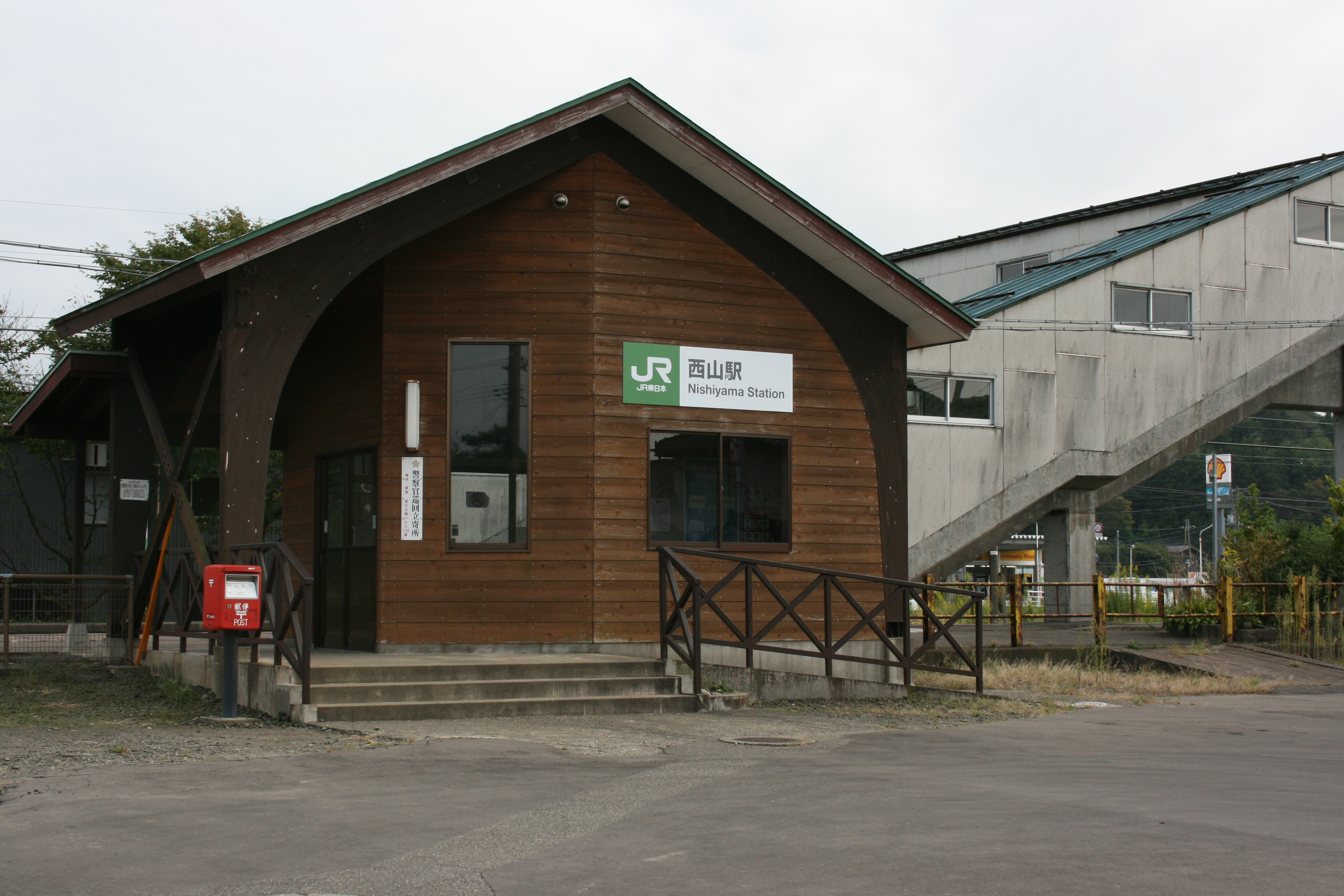
- Nishiyama Station, October 2009

General information
- Location: Nishiyama-cho, Kashiwazaki-shi, Niigata-ken 949-4141; Japan
- Coordinates: 37°26′54″N 138°38′30″E
- Operator: JR East
- Line: ■ Echigo Line
- Distance: 12.8 km from Kashiwazaki
- Platforms: 2 side platforms

Other information
- Status: unstaffed
- Website: www.jreast.co.jp/estation/station/info.aspx?StationCd=1175

History
- Opened: 11 November 1912

Passengers
- FY2010: 42 daily

Services
Preceding station	JR East	Following station
Kariwa towards Kashiwazaki	Echigo Line	Raihai towards Niigata
Location
- Location within JR Echigo Line Location within Japan

Nishiyama Station (西山駅, Nishiyama-eki) is a railway station in the city of Kashiwazaki, Niigata, Japan, operated by East Japan Railway Company (JR East).

== Lines ==
Nishiyama Station is served by the Echigo Line and is 12.8 kilometers from the terminus of the line at Kashiwazaki Station.

== Station layout ==
The station consists of a two opposed ground-level side platforms connected to the station building by a footbridge.

The station is unattended. Suica farecard cannot be used at this station.

=== Platforms ===
1	■ Echigo Line	for Yoshida, Niigata, for Kashiwazaki
2	■ Echigo Line	for Kashiwazaki (peak time only)

== History ==
Nishiyama Station opened on 11 November 1912. With the privatization of Japanese National Railways (JNR) on 1 April 1987, the station came under the control of JR East. A new station building was completed in 1992.

== Surrounding area ==
- National Route 116
- Nishiyama Post Office

== See also ==
- List of railway stations in Japan
