= Ishiji Station =

Railway station in Kashiwazaki, Niigata Prefecture, Japan

Ishiji Station 石地駅
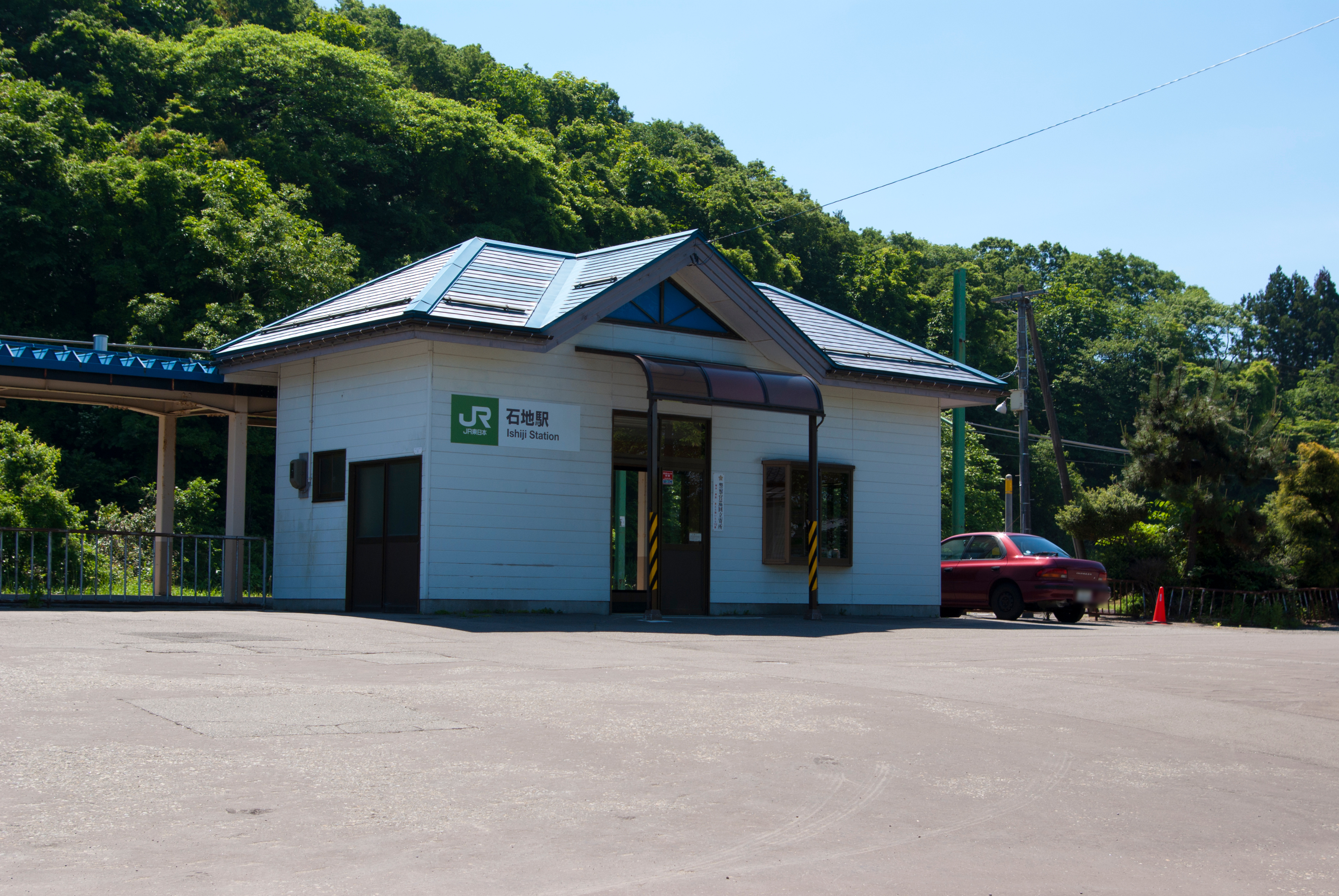
- Ishiji Station, June 2010

General information
- Location: Nishiyama-cho, Kashiwazaki-shi, Niigata-ken 949-411; Japan
- Coordinates: 37.4844°N 138.6881°E
- Operator: East Japan Railway Company
- Line: ■ Echigo Line
- Distance: 18.7 km from Kashiwazaki
- Platforms: 1 side platform

Other information
- Status: unstaffed
- Website: www.jreast.co.jp/estation/station/info.aspx?StationCd=117

History
- Opened: 11 November 1912

Services
Preceding station	JR East	Following station
Raihai towards Kashiwazaki	Echigo Line	Oginojō towards Niigata
Location
- Location within JR Echigo Line Location within Japan

Ishiji Station (石地駅, Ishiji-eki) is a railway station in the city of Kashiwazaki, Niigata, Japan, operated by East Japan Railway Company (JR East).

== Lines ==
Ishiji Station is served by the Echigo Line and is 18.7 kilometers from the terminus of the line at Kashiwazaki Station.

== Station layout ==
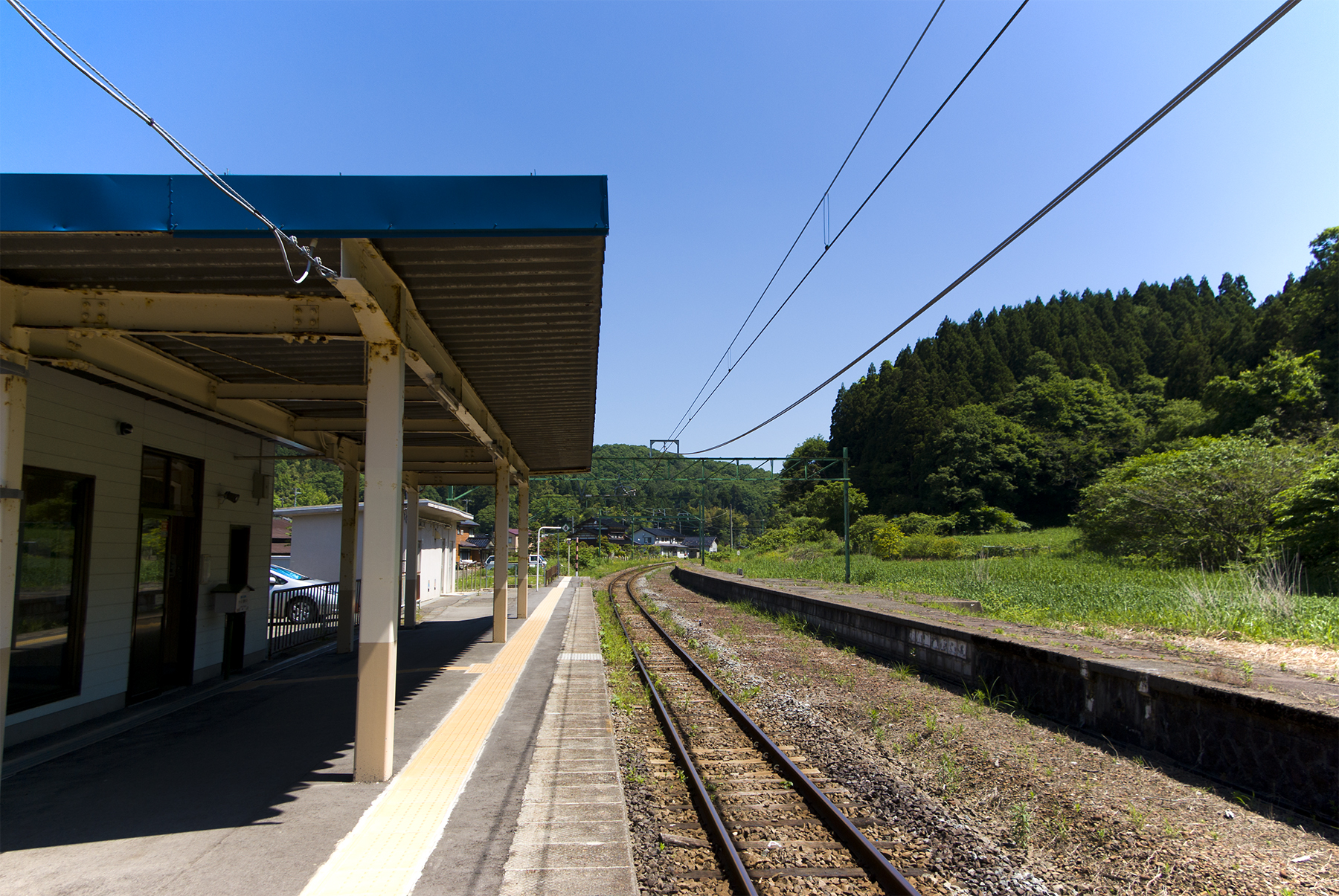
platform, June 2010

The station consists of a single ground-level side platform serving one bi-directional track.

The station is unattended. Suica farecard cannot be used at this station.

== History ==
Ishiji Station opened on 11 November 1912. With the privatization of Japanese National Railways (JNR) on 1 April 1987, the station came under the control of JR East.

== Surrounding area ==
- National Route 116

== See also ==
- List of railway stations in Japan
