= Kujiranami Station =

Railway station in Kashiwazaki, Niigata Prefecture, Japan

Kujiranami Station 鯨波駅
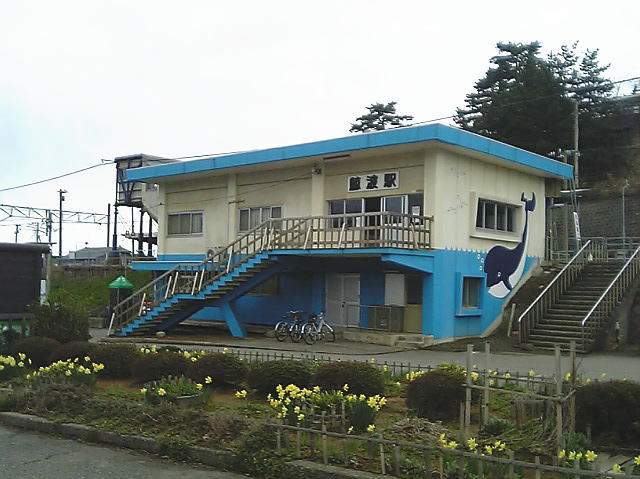
- Kujiranami Station, April 2006

General information
- Location: 1-3 Kujiranami, Kashiwazaki-shi, Niigata-ken 945-0855; Japan
- Coordinates: 37.3558°N 138.5174°E
- Operator: JR East
- Line: ■ Shin'etsu Main Line
- Distance: 32.6 km to Naoetsu
- Platforms: 2 side platforms

Other information
- Status: Unstaffed
- Website: Official website

History
- Opened: 1 April 1904; 122 years ago

Services
Preceding station	JR East	Following station
Ōmigawa towards Naoetsu	Shin'etsu Main Line Local	Kashiwazaki towards Niigata
Location
- Location within JR Shinetsu Main Line Location within Japan

Kujiranami Station (鯨波駅, Kujiranami-eki) is a railway station in the city of Kashiwazaki, Niigata, Japan, operated by the East Japan Railway Company (JR East).

== Lines ==
Kujiranami Station is served by the Shin'etsu Main Line and is 32.6 kilometers from the terminus of the line at Naoetsu.

== Station layout ==
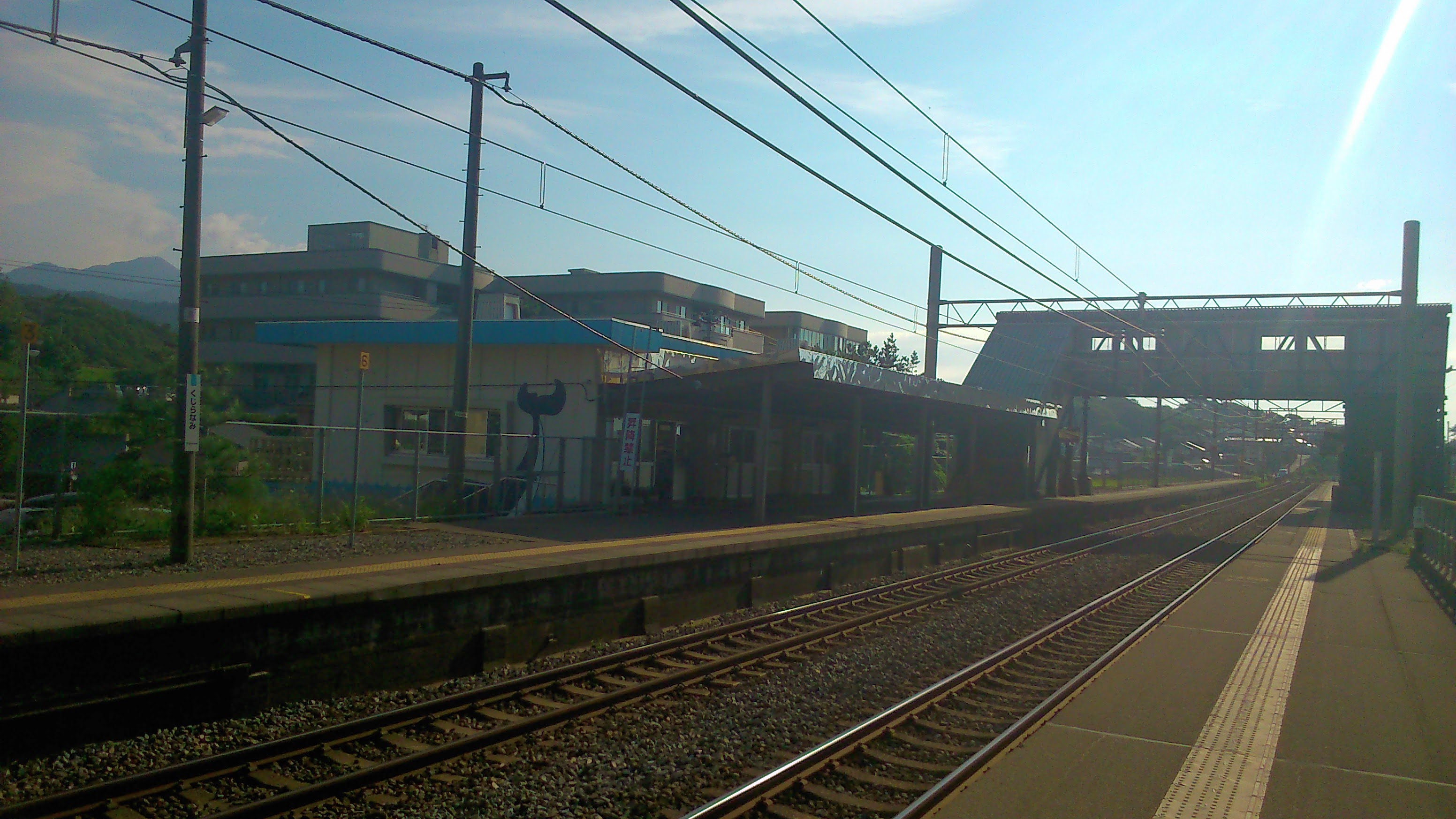
Platform

The station consists of two ground-level opposed side platforms connected by a footbridge, serving two tracks. The station is unattended.

=== Platforms ===
south	■ Shin'etsu Main Line	for Naoetsu
north	■ Shin'etsu Main Line	for Kashiwazaki and Nagaoka

== History ==
Kujiranami Station opened on 1 April 1904. With the privatization of Japanese National Railways (JNR) on 1 April 1987, the station came under the control of JR East. A new station building was completed in 2004.

== Surrounding area ==
- National Route 8
- Kujiranami Swimming Beach
- Kashiwazaki Marina

== See also ==
- List of railway stations in Japan
