= Raihai Station =

Railway station in Kashiwazaki, Niigata Prefecture, Japan

Raihai Station 礼拝駅
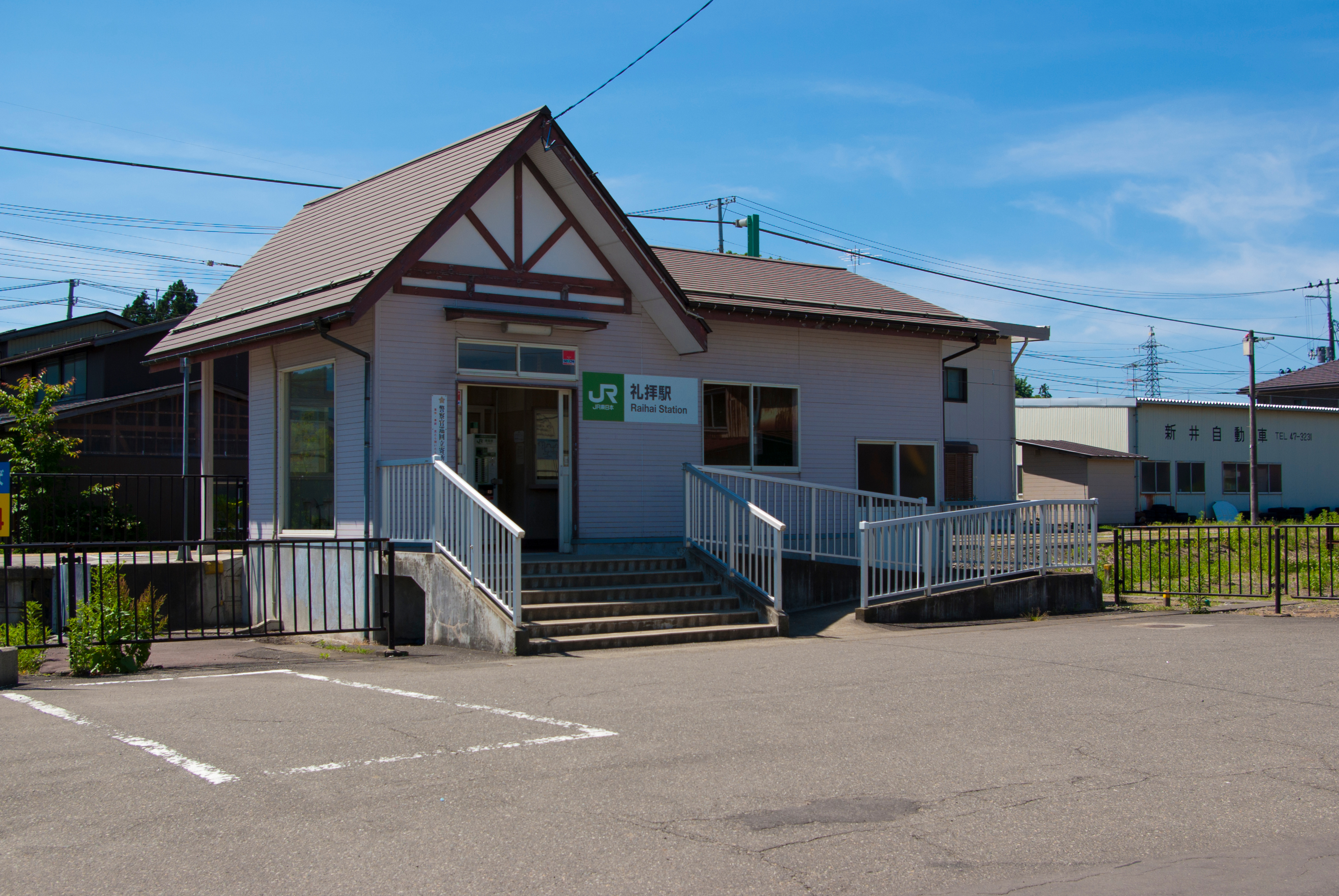
- Raihai Station, June 2010

General information
- Location: Nishiyama-cho, Kashiwazaki-shi, Niigata (新潟県柏崎市西山町礼拝); Japan
- Coordinates: 37.4590°N 138.6641°E
- Operator: JR East
- Line: ■ Echigo Line
- Distance: 15.0 km from Kashiwazaki
- Platforms: 1 side platform

Other information
- Status: unstaffed
- Website: www.jreast.co.jp/estation/station/info.aspx?StationCd=1657

History
- Opened: 16 December 1913

Services
Preceding station	JR East	Following station
Nishiyama towards Kashiwazaki	Echigo Line	Ishiji towards Niigata
Location
- Location within JR Echigo Line Location within Japan

Raihai Station (礼拝駅, Raihai-eki) is a railway station in the city of Kashiwazaki, Niigata, Japan, operated by East Japan Railway Company (JR East).

== Lines ==
Raihai Station is served by the Echigo Line and is 15.0 kilometers from the terminus of the line at Kashiwazaki Station.

== Station layout ==
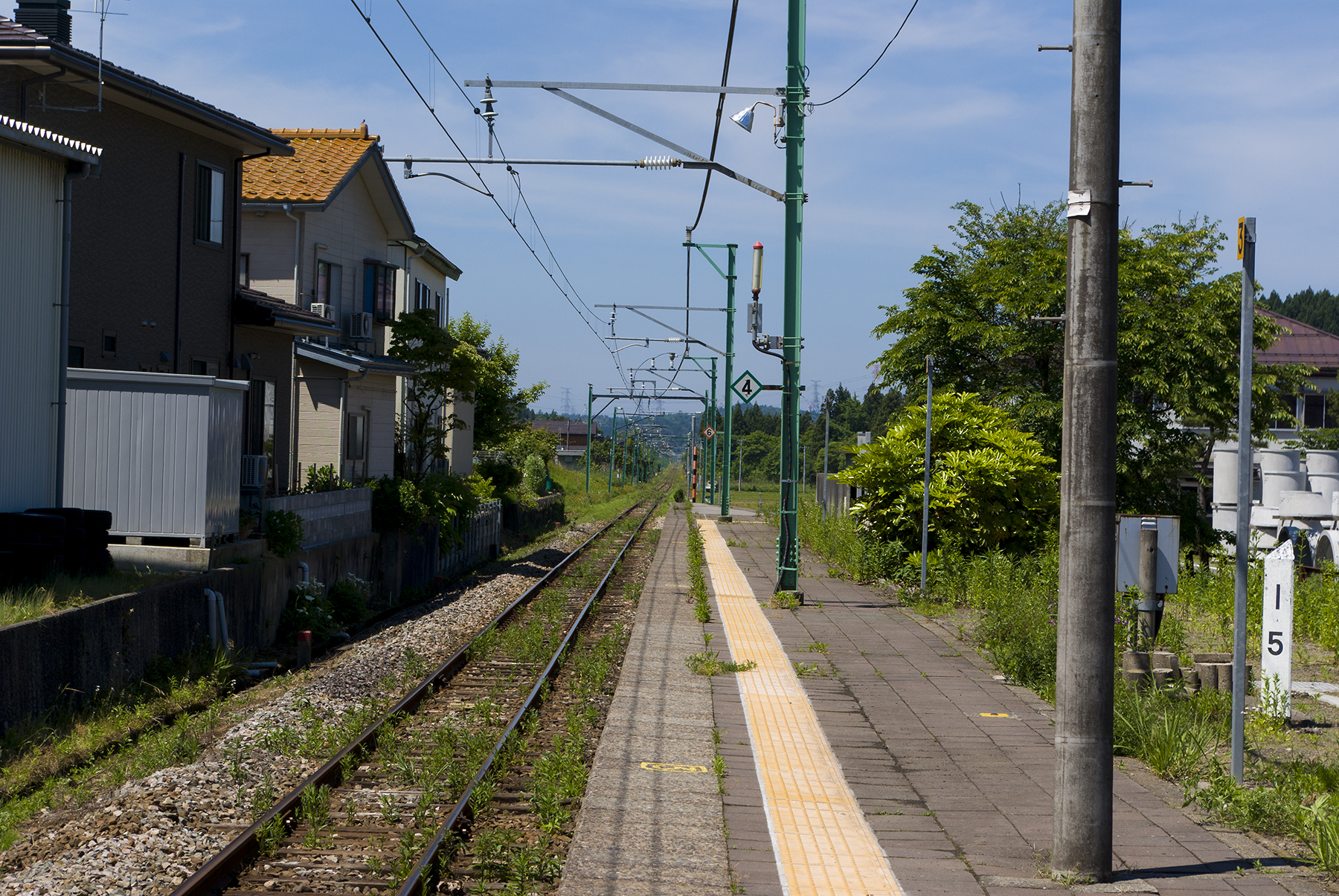
platform, June 2010

The station consists of a single ground-level side platform serving one bi-directional track, connected to the station building by a level crossing.

The station is unattended. Suica farecard cannot be used at this station.

== History ==
Raihai Station opened on 16 December 1913. With the privatization of Japanese National Railways (JNR) on 1 April 1987, the station came under the control of JR East.

== Surrounding area ==
- former Nishiyama Town Office
- Raihai Post Office

== See also ==
- List of railway stations in Japan
