= Nishi-Nakadōri Station =

Railway station in Kashiwazaki, Niigata Prefecture, Japan

Nishi-Nakadōri Station 西中通駅
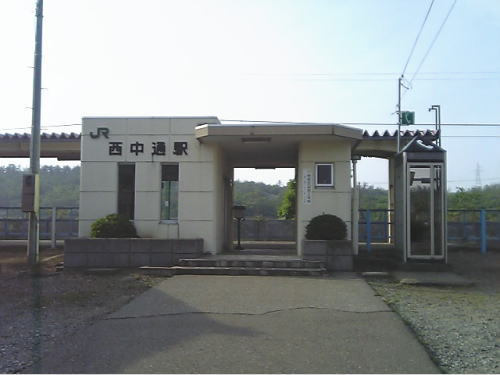
- Nishi-Nakadōri Station, June 2006

General information
- Location: 817 Yamamoto, Kashiwazaki-shi, Niigata-ken 945-0013; Japan
- Coordinates: 37°23′33″N 138°35′36″E
- Operator: JR East
- Line: ■ Echigo Line
- Distance: 5.0 km from Kashiwazaki
- Platforms: 1 side platform

Other information
- Status: unstaffed
- Website: www.jreast.co.jp/estation/station/info.aspx?StationCd=1165

History
- Opened: 1912
- Former names: Arahama Station (to 1915)

Services
Preceding station	JR East	Following station
Higashi-Kashiwazaki towards Kashiwazaki	Echigo Line	Arahama towards Niigata
Location
- Location within JR Echigo Line Location within Japan

Nishi-Nakadōri Station (西中通駅, Nishi-Nakadōri-eki) is a railway station in the city of Kashiwazaki, Niigata, Japan, operated by East Japan Railway Company (JR East).

== Lines ==
Nishi-Nakadōri Station is served by the Echigo Line and is 5.0 kilometers from the terminus of the line at Kashiwazaki Station.

== Station layout ==
The station consists of a single ground-level side platform serving one bi-directional track.

The station is unattended. Suica farecard cannot be used at this station.

== History ==
Nishi-Nakadōri Station opened on 11 November 1912 as Arahama Station (荒浜駅, Arahama Station). It was renamed to its present name on 1 July 1915. With the privatization of Japanese National Railways (JNR) on 1 April 1987, the station came under the control of JR East.

== Surrounding area ==
- National Route 8

== See also ==
- List of railway stations in Japan
