= Kariwa Station =

Railway station in Kariwa, Niigata Prefecture, Japan

Kariwa Station 刈羽駅
- Kariwa Station, October 2009

General information
- Location: Kariwa-mura, Kariwa-gun, Niigata-ken 945-0307; Japan
- Coordinates: 37.4300°N 138.6195°E
- Operator: JR East
- Line: ■ Echigo Line
- Distance: 9.9 km from Kashiwazaki
- Platforms: 1 side platform
- Tracks: 1

Other information
- Status: unstaffed
- Website: www.jreast.co.jp/estation/station/info.aspx?StationCd=516

History
- Opened: 11 November 1912

Services
Preceding station	JR East	Following station
Arahama towards Kashiwazaki	Echigo Line	Nishiyama towards Niigata
Location
- Location within JR Echigo Line Location within Japan

Kariwa Station (刈羽駅, Kariwa-eki) is a railway station in the village of Kariwa, Niigata, Japan, operated by East Japan Railway Company (JR East).

== Lines ==
Kariwa Station is served by the Echigo Line and is 9.9 kilometers from the terminus of the line at Kashiwazaki Station.

== Station layout ==
The station consists of one ground-level side platform serving a single bi-directional track.

The station is unattended. Suica farecard cannot be used at this station.

== History ==
Kariwa Station opened on 11 November 1912. A new station building was completed in 1984. With the privatization of Japanese National Railways (JNR) on 1 April 1987, the station came under the control of JR East.

== Surrounding area ==
- Kariwa Village Hall
- Kariwa Post Office
- Kariwa Shell Midden
- Kashiwazaki-Kariwa Nuclear Power Plant

== See also ==
- List of railway stations in Japan
