= Arahama Station =

Railway station in Kariwa, Niigata Prefecture, Japan

Arahama Station 荒浜駅
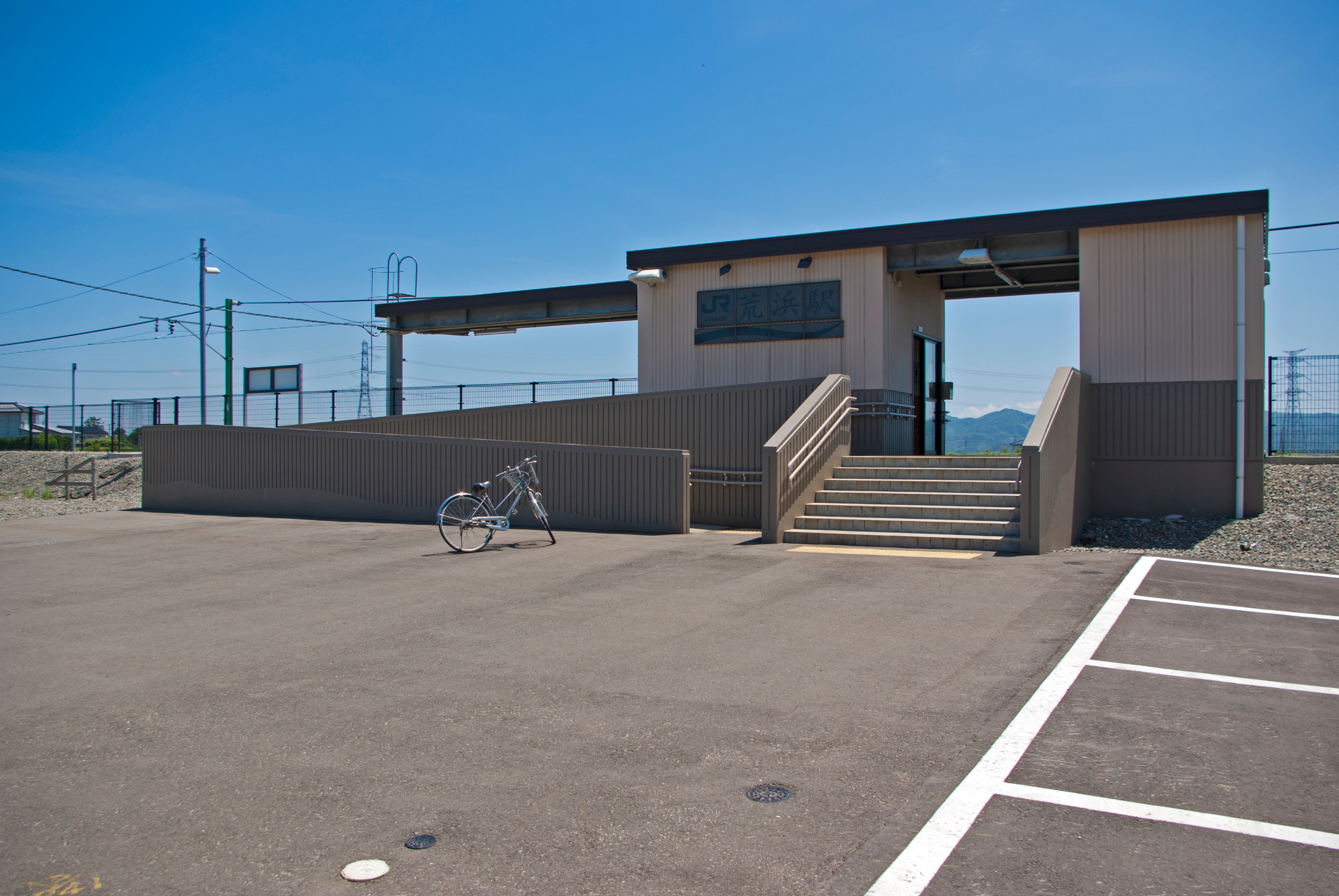
- Arahama Station building in June 2010

General information
- Location: Shomyo-ji, Kariwa-mura, Kariwa-gun, Niigata-ken 945-0317
- Coordinates: 37.4047°N 138.6018°E
- Operator: East Japan Railway Company
- Line: ■ Echigo Line
- Distance: 6.6 km from Kashiwazaki
- Platforms: 1 side platform
- Tracks: 1

Other information
- Status: unattended
- Website: Official website

History
- Opened: 15 June 1915

Services
Preceding station	JR East	Following station
Nishi-Nakadōri towards Kashiwazaki	Echigo Line	Kariwa towards Niigata
Location
- Location within JR Echigo Line Location within Japan

Arahama Station (荒浜駅, Arahama-eki) is a train station in the village of Kariwa, Kariwa District, Niigata Prefecture, Japan, operated by the East Japan Railway Company (JR East).

== Lines ==
Arahama Station is served by the Echigo Line and is 6.6 kilometers from the terminus of the line at Kashiwazaki Station.

== Station layout ==
The station consists of one ground-level side platform serving a single bi-directional track.

The station is unattended. Suica farecard cannot be used at this station.

== History ==
Arahama Station opened on 15 June 1915. With the privatization of Japanese National Railways (JNR) on 1 April 1987, the station came under the control of JR East. The current station building was completed in 2008.

== See also ==
- List of railway stations in Japan
