= Shimoyachi Site =

- 下谷地遺跡 (Japanese)
- Shimoyachi Site Shimoyachi Site (Japan)
- 37°23′51″N 138°37′27″E
- Type: Settlement
- Periods: Yayoi period
- Location: Kashiwazaki, Niigata, Japan
- Region: Hokuriku region

Site notes
- Elevation: 80 m (260 ft)
- Public access: Yes (no public facilities)

The Shimoyachi Site (下谷地遺跡, Shimoyachi iseki) is an archaeological site containing the traces of a middle Yayoi period settlement located in the Yoshii neighborhood of the city of Kashiwazaki, Niigata in the Hokuriku region of Japan. It was designated a National Historic Site of Japan in 1979.

== Overview ==
The Shimoyachi Site is located approximately five kilometers northeast of the urban center of Kashiwazaki, approximately at the center of a small marshy plain behind the dunes along the Sea of Japan coast. It contains the ruins of a village from in the middle of the Yayoi period (approximately 2000 years ago), which was excavated by the Niigata Prefectural Board of Education from 1977 to 1978.

As the settlement was located in marshy lowlands, it was surrounded by a ditch for drainage, with dirt taken from the ditch piled up to make a rough levee. Six unique circular pit dwellings were discovered, which had a diameter of five to nine meters surrounding a central hearth. Other rectangular structures were also identified. In addition, the site had approximately 160 mounds in various shapes: circular, elliptical, and square arranged in two rows, which seem to have been used for various purposes. Some were grave tumuli containing the remains of wooden coffins, and others appeared to be used as storage pits. Numerous examples of Yayoi pottery were found, including pots for storage and pots for cooking. The style was mostly a combed design common throughout the Hokuriku region, but there were also a large number of pieces from Shinano Province, indicating long-distance trade. The village appeared to be a mass-production center for jadeite balls and cylindrical beads, mortar balls and sling balls, as numerous items in the intermediate stages of production were also found. Paddy fields were not discovered at the site, but a large amount of carbonized rice and stone sickles for harvesting rice were excavated, indicating that rice cultivation existed in the area.

The site was backfilled after excavation, with no reconstruction or public facilities. It is located about 15 minutes by car from JR East Shin'etsu Main Line Kashiwazaki Station.

== See also ==
- List of Historic Sites of Japan (Niigata)
