= Higashi-Kashiwazaki Station =

Railway station in Kashiwazaki, Niigata Prefecture, Japan

Higashi-Kashiwazaki Station 東柏崎駅
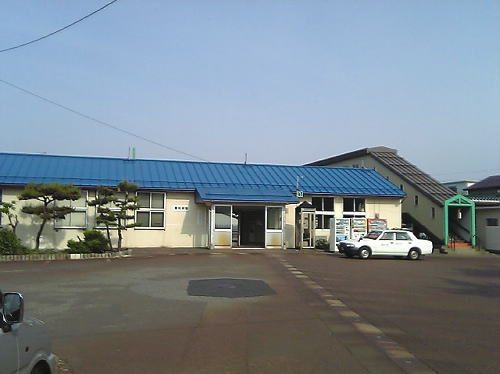
- Higashi-Kashiwazaki Station, June 2006

General information
- Location: 8-12 Okura-chō, Kashiwazaki-shi, Niigata-ken 945-0076; Japan
- Coordinates: 37.3736°N 138.5656°E
- Operator: East Japan Railway Company
- Line: ■ Echigo Line
- Distance: 1.6 km from Kashiwazaki
- Platforms: 2 side platforms

Other information
- Status: unstaffed
- Website: www.jreast.co.jp/estation/station/info.aspx?StationCd=1274

History
- Opened: 11 November 1912
- Former names: Hisumi Statiuon (to October 1969)

Passengers
- FY2010: 120 daily

Services
| Preceding station | JR East | Following station |
|---|---|---|
| Kashiwazaki Terminus | Echigo Line | Nishi-Nakadōri towards Niigata |
Location
- Location within JR Echigo Line Location within Japan

Higashi-Kashiwazaki Station (東柏崎駅, Higashi-Kashiwazaki-eki) is a railway station in the city of Kashiwazaki, Niigata, Japan, operated by East Japan Railway Company (JR East).

== Lines ==
Higashi-Kashiwazaki Station is served by the Echigo Line and is 1.6 kilometers from the terminus of the line at Kashiwazaki Station.

== Station layout ==
The station consists of a two opposed ground-level side platforms connected by a footbridge; however, only one platform is in use, and serves one bi-directional track.

The station is unattended. Suica farecard cannot be used at this station.

== History ==
Higashi-Kashiwazaki Station opened on 11 November 1912 as Hisumi Station (比角駅). It was renamed to its present name on 1 October 1969. With the privatization of Japanese National Railways (JNR) on 1 April 1987, the station came under the control of JR East.

== Surrounding area ==
- Kashiwazaki Tokiwa High School

== See also ==
- List of railway stations in Japan
