= Ibarame Station =

Railway station in Kashiwazaki, Niigata Prefecture, Japan

Ibarame Station 茨目駅
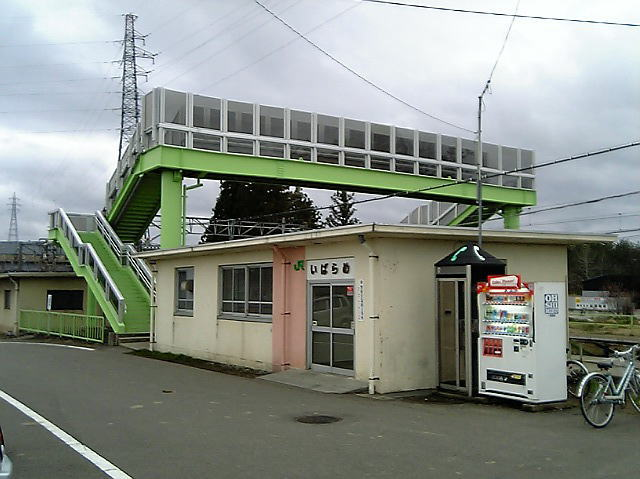
- Ibarame Station north exit, April 2006

General information
- Location: 2-23-15 Ibarame, Kashiwazaki-shi, Niigata-ken 945-1341; Japan
- Coordinates: 37.3572°N 138.5868°E
- Operator: JR East
- Line: ■ Shin'etsu Main Line
- Distance: 39.3 km to Naoetsu
- Platforms: 2 side platforms

Other information
- Status: Unstaffed
- Website: Official website

History
- Opened: 8 December 1964; 61 years ago

Services
Preceding station	JR East	Following station
Kashiwazaki towards Naoetsu	Shin'etsu Main Line Local	Yasuda towards Niigata
Location
- Location within JR Shinetsu Main Line Location within Japan

Ibarame Station (茨目駅, Ibarame-eki) is a railway station in the city of Kashiwazaki, Niigata, Japan, operated by East Japan Railway Company (JR East).

== Lines ==
Ibarame Station is served by the Shin'etsu Main Line and is 39.3 kilometers from the terminus of the line at Naoetsu.

== Station layout ==
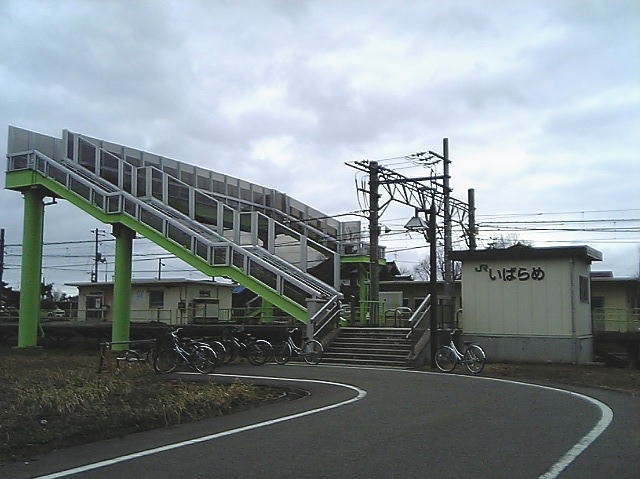
Ibarame Station south exit, April 2006

The station consists of two ground-level opposed side platforms connected by a footbridge, serving two tracks. The station is unattended.

=== Platforms ===
1	■ Shin'etsu Main Line	for Kashiwazaki and Naoetsu
2	■ Shin'etsu Main Line	for Nagaoka and Niigata

== History ==
Ibarame Station opened on 8 December 1964. With the privatization of Japanese National Railways (JNR) on 1 April 1987, the station came under the control of JR East.

== Surrounding area ==
- Kashiwazaki Satogaike Baseball Stadium

== See also ==
- List of railway stations in Japan
