= Niigata Institute of Technology =

Japanese private university established in 1995

Coordinates: 37°20′21.2″N 138°34′44.4″E

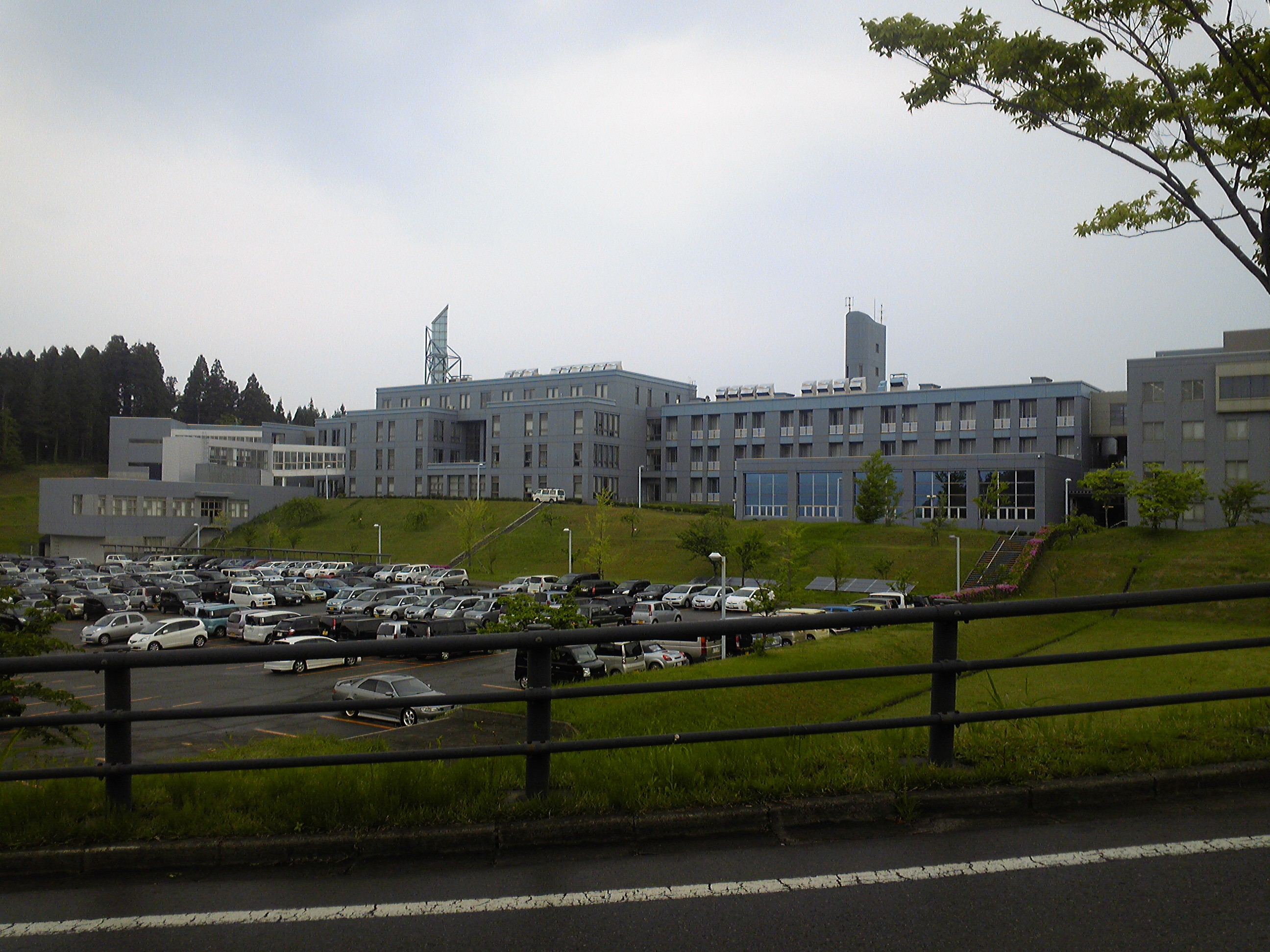
Niigata Institute of Technology

Niigata Institute of Technology (新潟工科大学, Niigata kōka daigaku) is a private university in Kashiwazaki, Niigata, Japan. It was established in 1995.
