= Kariwa =

Kariwa 刈羽村
- Village
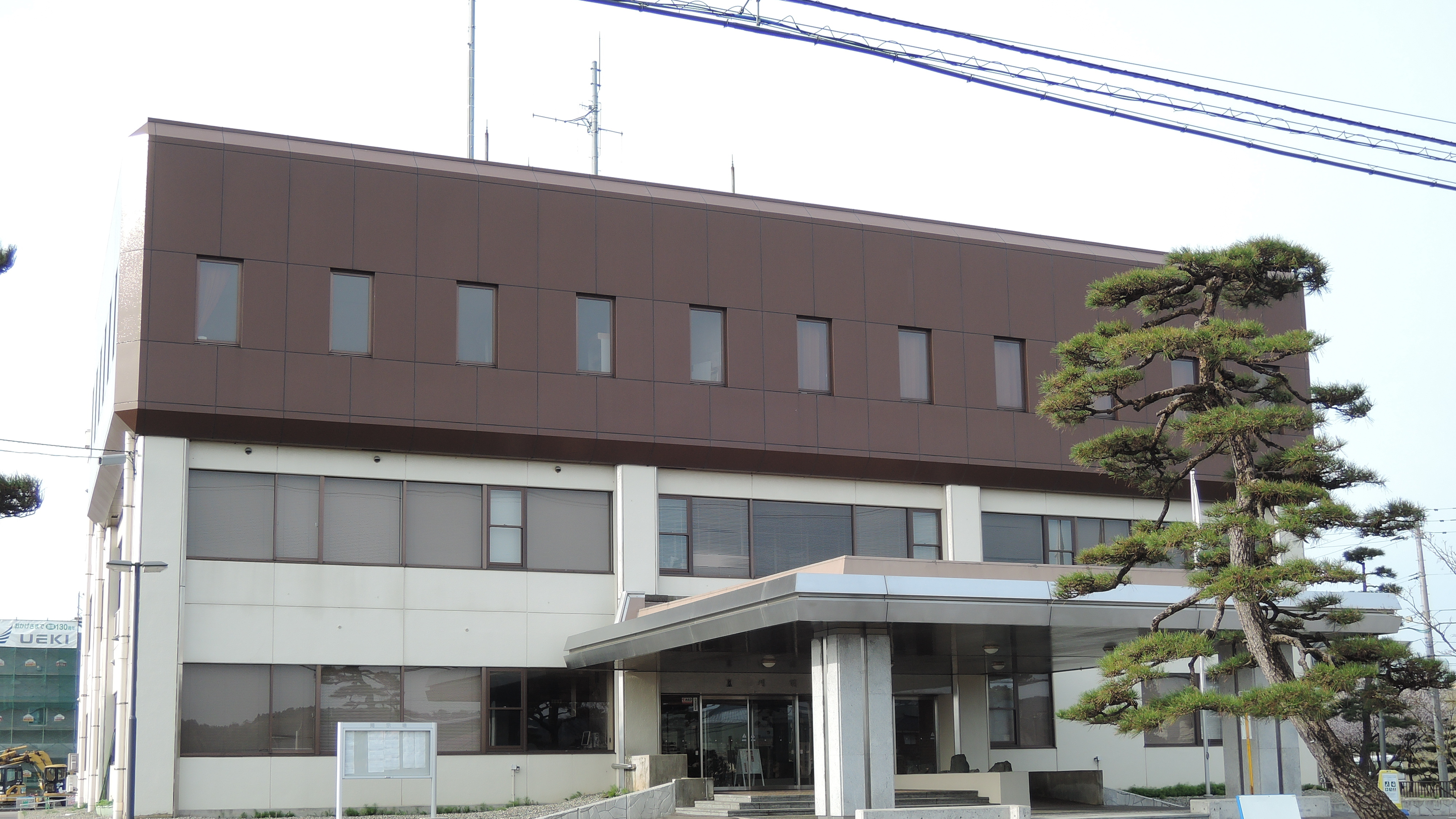
- Kariwa village hall

- Flag Seal

- Location of Kariwa in Niigata

- Coordinates: 37°25′20.1″N 138°37′21.1″E
- Country: Japan
- Region: Chūbu (Kōshin'etsu) (Hokuriku)
- Prefecture: Niigata
- District: Kariwa

Area
  - Total: 26.27 km^{2} (10.14 sq mi)

Population (July 1, 2019)
  - Total: 4,578
  - Density: 174.3/km^{2} (451.4/sq mi)
- Time zone: UTC+9 (Japan Standard Time)
- Symbols
  - Tree: Japanese black pine
  - Flower: Peach
- Phone number: 0257-45-2244
- Address: 215-1 Warimachi-Shinden, Kariwa-mura, Kariwa-gun, Niigata-ken 945-0308
- Website: Official website

Kariwa (刈羽村, Kariwa-mura) is a village located in Niigata Prefecture, Japan. As of 1 July 2019, the village had an estimated population of 4,578 in 1613 households, and a population density of 174 persons per km^{2}. The total area of the village was 26.27 square kilometres (10.14 sq mi).

== Geography ==
Kariwa is located in central Niigata Prefecture, sandwiched between the cities of Nagaoka and Kashiwazaki, and consists of two discontinuous areas. Kariwa is located near the Sea of Japan but has no coastline. It takes over 3 hours to reach Tokyo by train (using local trains and Jōetsu Shinkansen from Nagaoka), or by car on the Kan-Etsu Expressway.

=== Surrounding municipalities ===
- Niigata Prefecture
  - Kashiwazaki
  - Nagaoka

== Demographics ==
Per Japanese census data, the population of Kariwa peaked at around the year 1990, and has declined steadily since.

Historical population
Year	Pop.	±%
1970	5,429	—
1980	5,346	−1.5%
1990	5,522	+3.3%
2000	5,028	−8.9%
2010	4,800	−4.5%
2020	4,380	−8.8%

== History ==
The area of present-day Kariwa was part of ancient Echigo Province and was part of the tenryō holdings of the Tokugawa shogunate during the Edo period. The village of Kariwa was established within Kariwa District, Niigata with the creation of the modern municipalities system on April 1, 1889. On September 30, 1956, a part of the neighbouring village of Nakadori was absorbed into Kariwa. Likewise, on April 10, 1959, a part of neighbouring Futada village was absorbed into Kariwa

=== 2007 Chūetsu offshore earthquake ===
A magnitude 6.8 earthquake hit off the coast of Kashiwazaki, killing 10 people, and injuring more than 1,200, causing massive power outages. Total over 340 houses were destroyed and thousands of people were forced to live at the shelters. The quake caused a fire at Kashiwazaki-Kariwa nuclear power plant in an electrical transformer, a leak of water from the spent fuel pool, and a host of other safety related events.

== Economy ==
Together with Kashiwazaki city, Kariwa is the home of the Tokyo Electric Power Company's Kashiwazaki-Kariwa nuclear power plant, once the largest nuclear generating station in the world by net electrical power rating. After the April 2011 earthquake, all restarted units were shut down and safety improvements are being carried out. As of January 2026 only Unit 6 has been restarted.

== Education ==
Kariwa has three public elementary schools and one public middle school operated by the village government. The village does not have a high school.

== Transportation ==
=== Railway ===
JR East - Echigo Line

- Arahama - Kariwa

=== Highway ===
- Hokuriku Expressway
- National Route 8
- National Route 116
- National Route 352

== Sister cities ==
- Half Moon Bay, California, United States

== Local attractions ==
- Akada castle remains (Now used as hiking paths)
- Hozo-ji (temple)
- Joraku-ji (temple)
- Kariwa Midden (Prehistoric site)
- Kariwa Village Life Learning Center "Rapika"
- Katsuyama castle remains (Now used as hiking paths)
- Tohuku-in (temple)

=== Festivals ===
- Takiya Toro Oshiai Matsuri (Lantern Battle Festival) (April)
- Peach Flower Festival (April)
- Kariwa-mura Furusato Matsuri (Village Festival) (August)
