= Kashiwazaki Station =

Railway station in Kashiwazaki, Niigata Prefecture, Japan

Kashiwazaki Station 柏崎駅
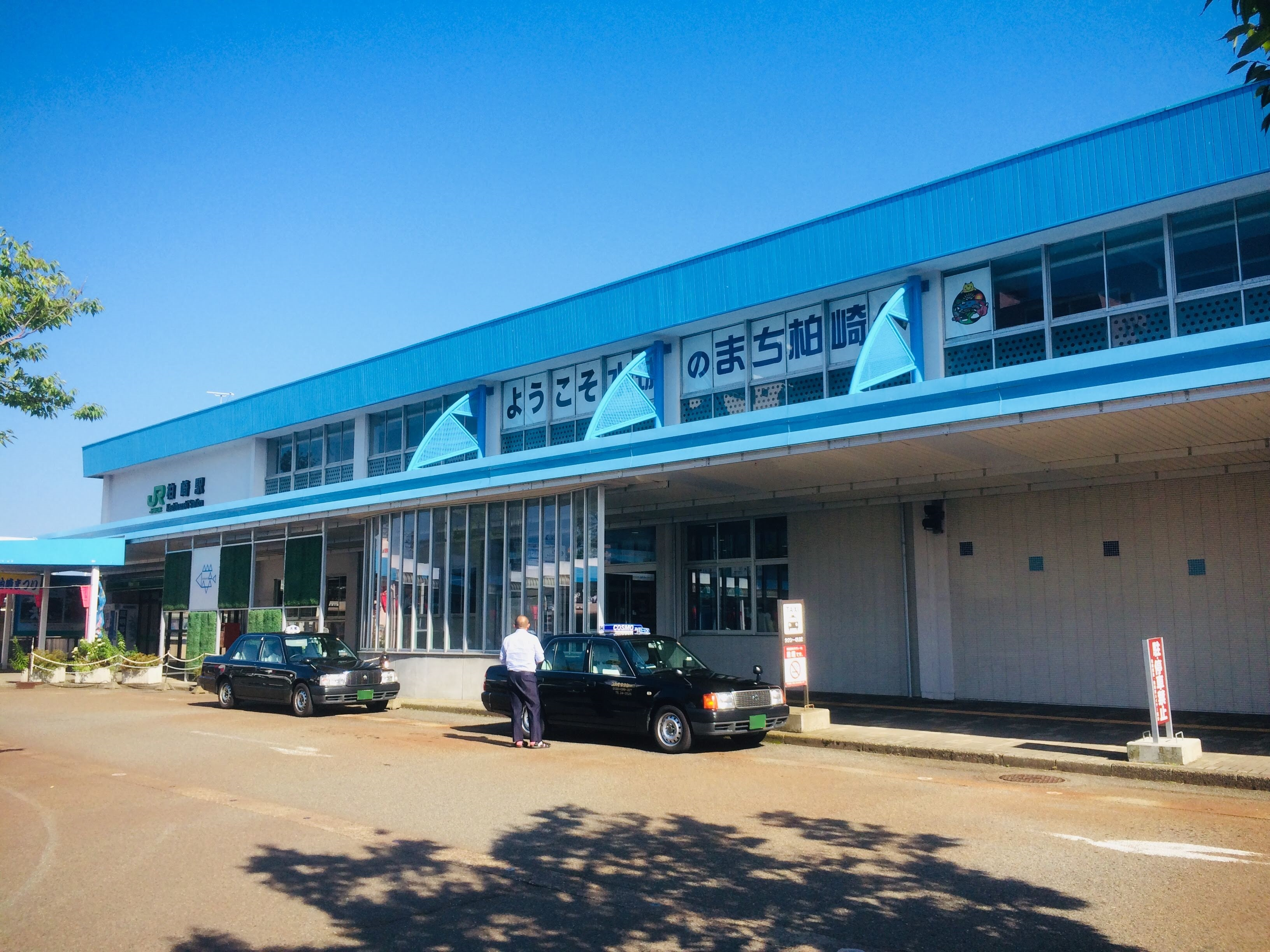
- Kashiwazaki Station in July 2018

General information
- Location: 1 Ekimae, Kashiwazaki-shi, Niigata-ken 945-0055; Japan
- Coordinates: 37.3634°N 138.5564°E
- Operator: JR East; JR Freight
- Lines: ■ Shinetsu Main Line; ■ Echigo Line
- Distance: 36.3 from Naoetsu
- Platforms: 2 island platforms
- Tracks: 4

Other information
- Status: Staffed (Midori no Madoguchi)
- Website: Official website

History
- Opened: 1 August 1897; 129 years ago
- Rebuilt: 1967; 59 years ago

Passengers
- 1,623 (FY2017)

Services
Preceding station	JR East	Following station
Kakizaki towards Naoetsu	Shirayuki	Nagaoka towards Niigata
Kakizaki towards Naoetsu	Shin'etsu Main Line Rapid	Raikōji towards Niigata
Kakizaki towards Naoetsu	Shin'etsu Main Line Local	Ibarame towards Niigata
Terminus	Echigo Line	Higashi-Kashiwazaki towards Niigata
Location
- Location within JR Shinetsu Main Line Location within JR Echigo Line Location within Japan

Kashiwazaki Station (柏崎駅, Kashiwazaki-eki) is a railway station in the city of Kashiwazaki, Niigata, Japan, operated by East Japan Railway Company (JR East). It is also a freight terminal for the Japan Freight Railway Company.

== Lines ==
Kashiwazaki Station is served by both the Shinetsu Main Line and the Echigo Line. It is 36.3 kilometers from the terminus of the Shinetsu Main Line at Naoetsu, and forms the terminus of the Echigo Line.

== Station layout ==
The station consists of two island platforms, serving four tracks, connected by a footbridge. The two-story station building has a Midori no Madoguchi staffed ticket office.

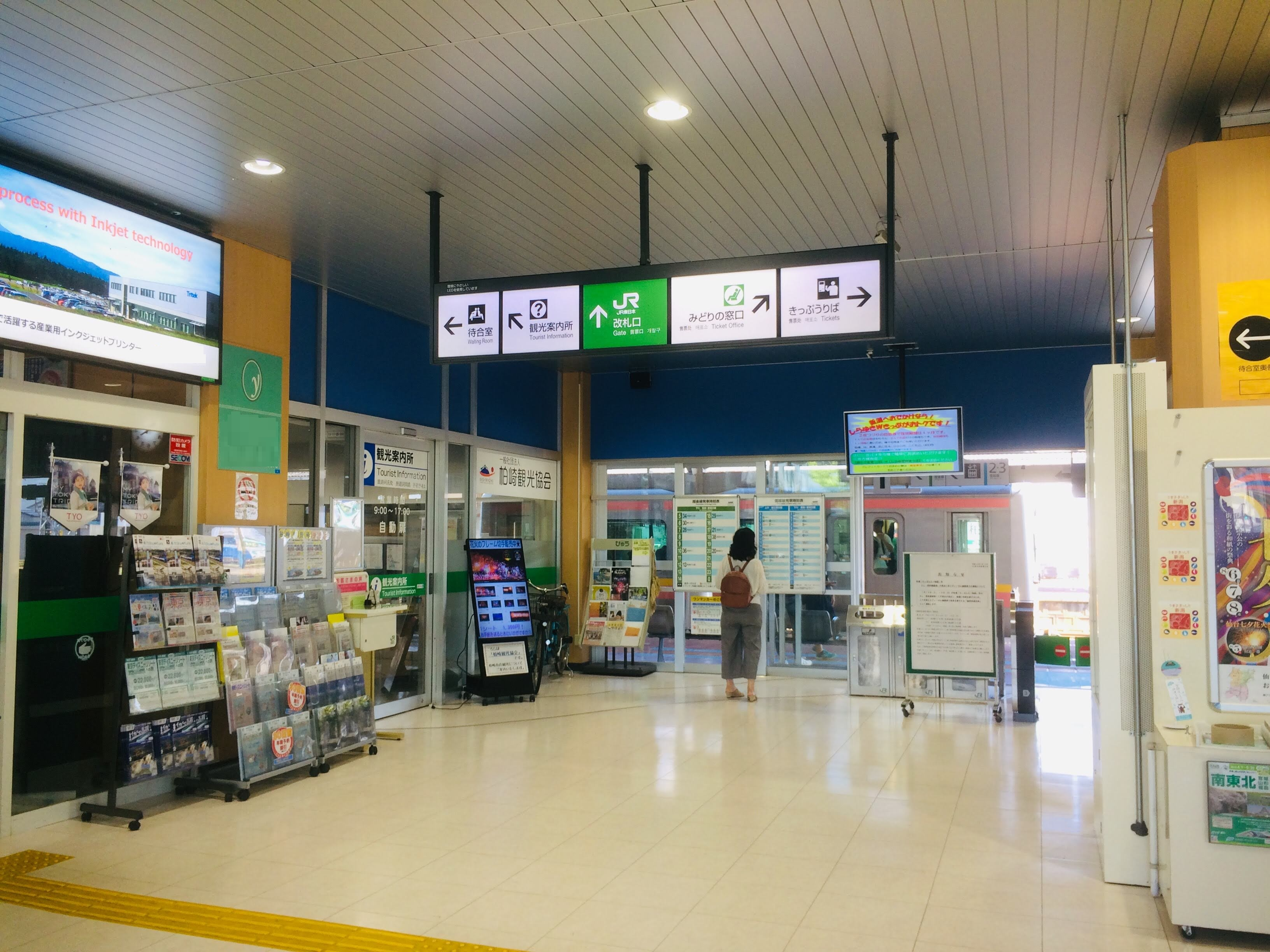
Entrance

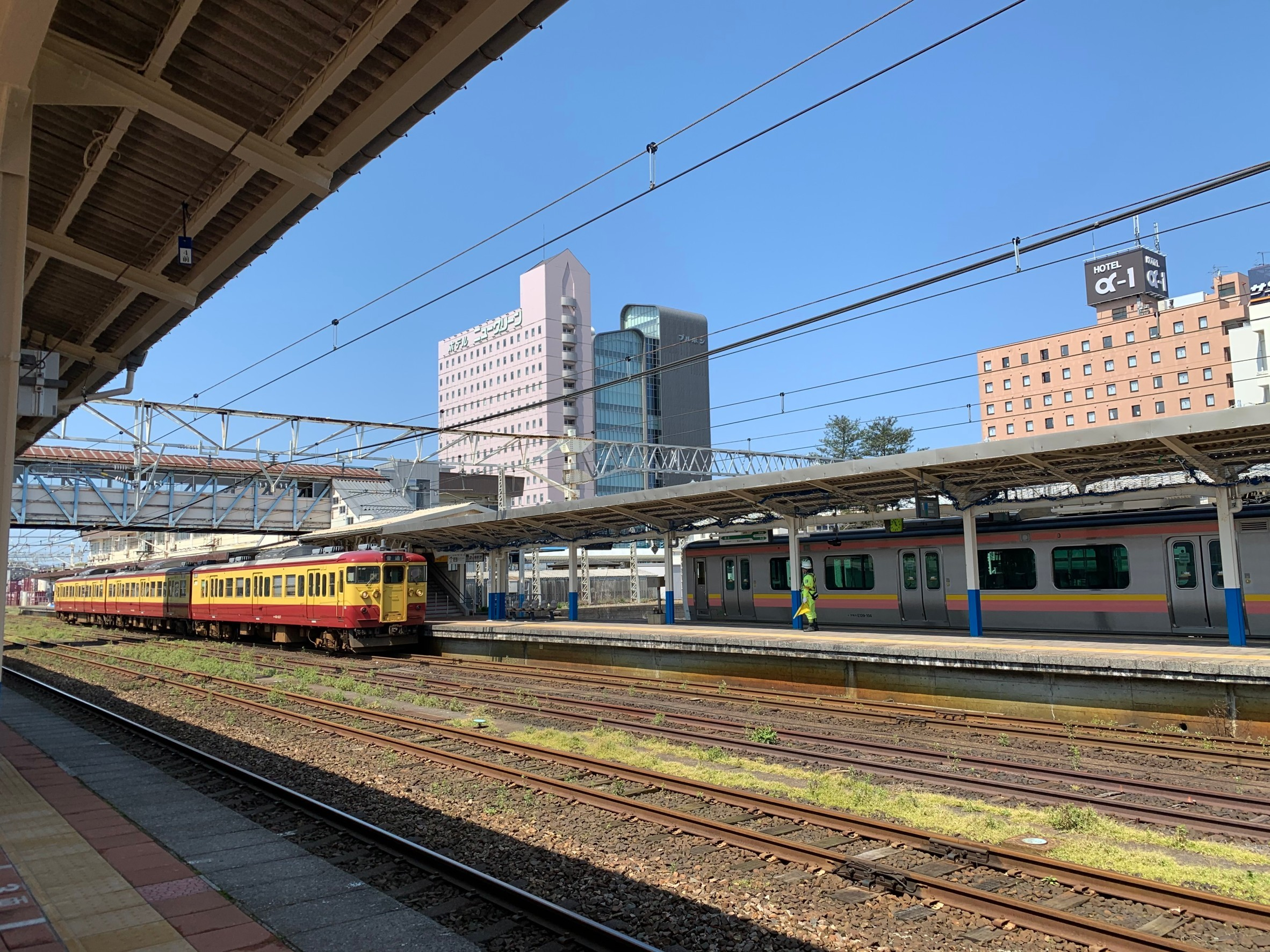
Platforms, April 2020

=== Platforms ===
0	■ Echigo Line	for Yoshida and Niigata
1	■ Shinetsu Main Line	passing track
2	■ Shinetsu Main Line	for Nagaoka and Niigata
3	■ Shinetsu Main Line	for Naoetsu

== History ==
Kashiwazaki Station opened on 1 August 1897. A new station building was completed in October 1967. With the privatization of Japanese National Railways (JNR) on 1 April 1987, the station came under the control of JR East.

== Surrounding area ==
- National Route 8
- National Route 352
- Kashiwazaki Post Office
- Kashiwazaki High School
- Headquarter of Bourbon Corporation
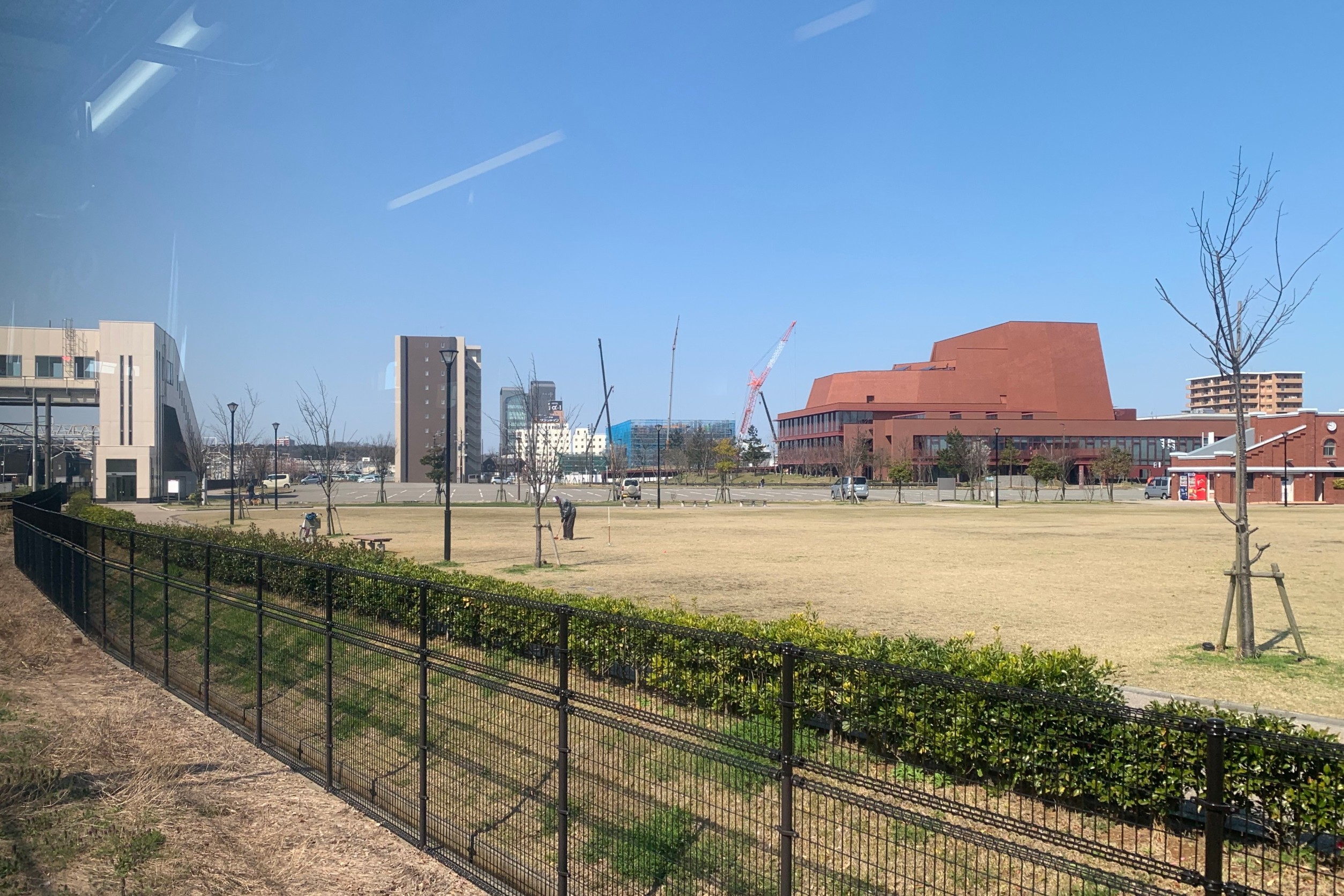
Kashiwazaki_ArtForet, April 2020

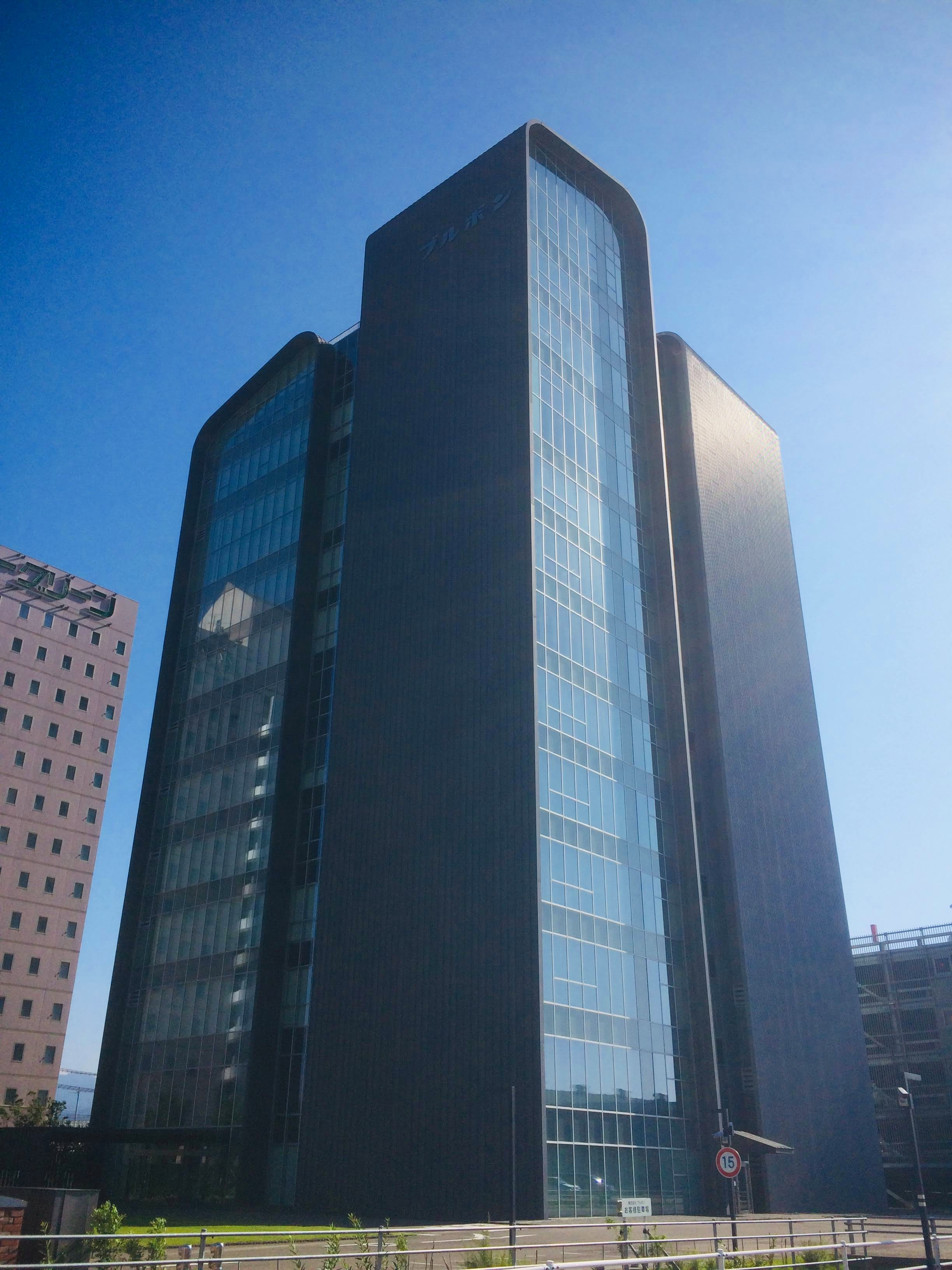
Headquarter of Bourbon Corporation

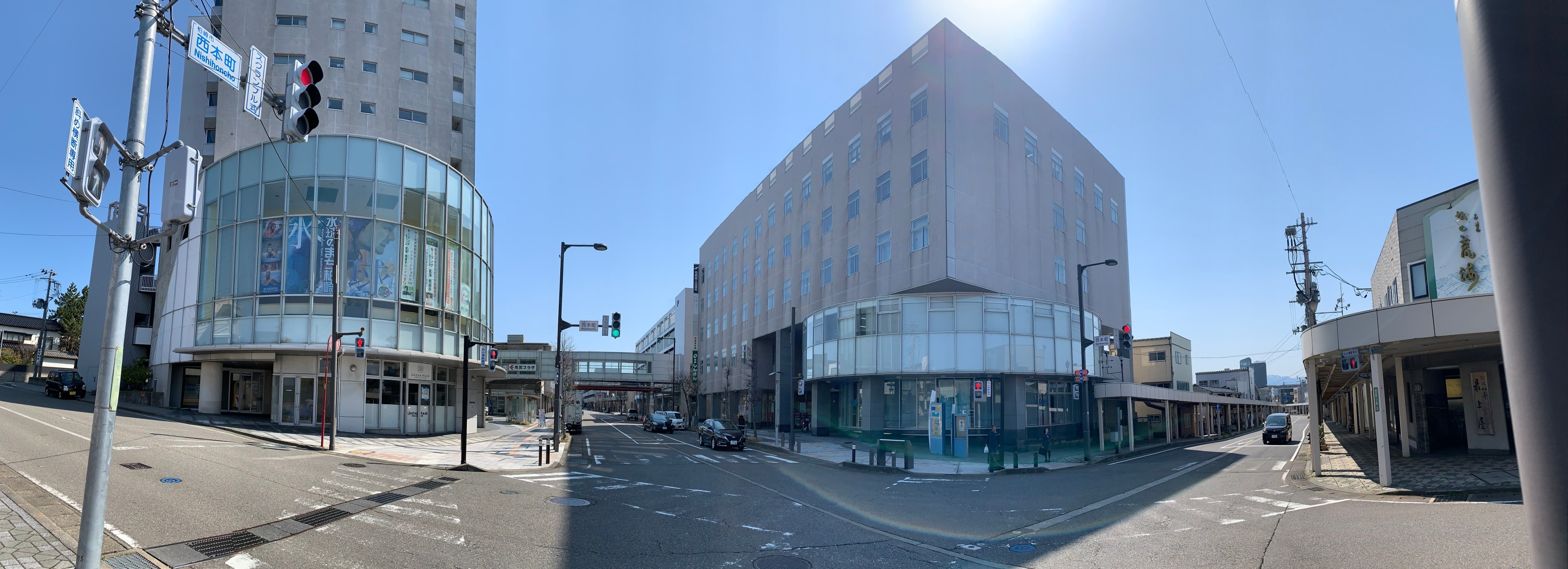
Nishihoncho crossing

== Passenger statistics ==
In fiscal 2017, the station was used by an average of 1,623 passengers daily (boarding passengers only).

== See also ==
- List of railway stations in Japan
