= Niigata Station =

Railway station in Niigata, Japan

Niigata Station 新潟駅
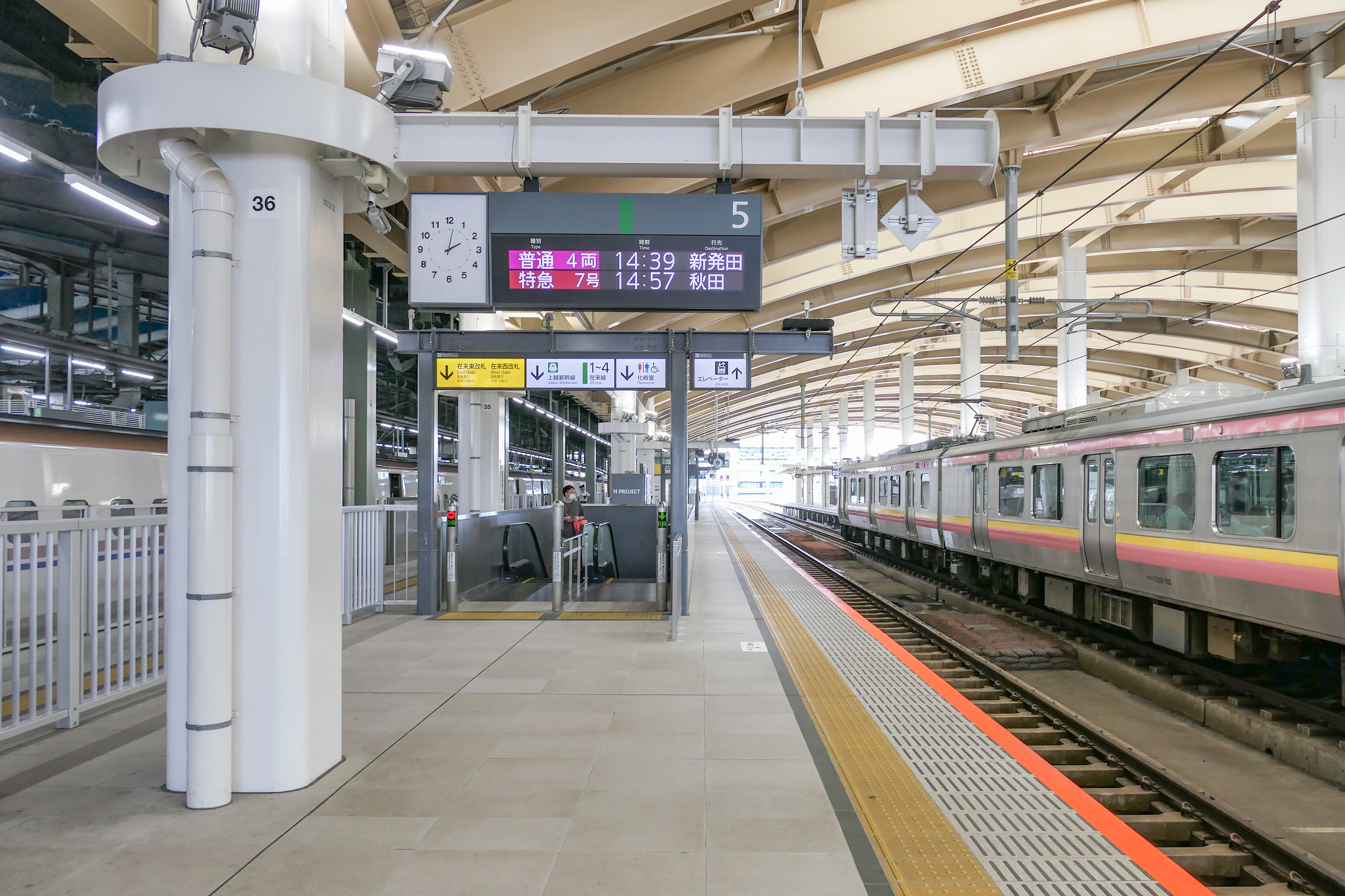
- Platform 5, with an E129 series to the right and an E7 Series Shinkansen to the left

General information
- Location: 1 Hanazono, Chūō-ku, Niigata-shi; Niigata-ken 950-0086; Japan
- Coordinates: 37°54′43.3″N 139°3′42.8″E
- Operator: JR East
- Lines: Jōetsu Shinkansen; Shin'etsu Main Line; Hakushin Line; Echigo Line
- Platforms: 2 side + 4 island platforms
- Tracks: 4 Shinkansen; 5 Conventional lines
- Connections: Bus terminal

Construction
- Structure type: Elevated

Other information
- Status: Staffed ("Midori no Madoguchi" )
- Website: Official website

History
- Opened: 3 May 1904; 122 years ago

Passengers
- FY2017: 37,461 daily

Services
Preceding station	JR East	Following station
Tsubame-Sanjō towards Tokyo	Jōetsu Shinkansen Toki	Terminus
Niitsu towards Naoetsu	Shirayuki	Terminus
Kameda towards Naoetsu	Shin'etsu Main Line Rapid	Terminus
Echigo-Ishiyama towards Naoetsu	Shin'etsu Main Line Local	Terminus
Terminus	Inaho	Toyosaka towards Akita
Terminus	Hakushin Line	Higashi-Niigata towards Shibata
Kamitokoro towards Kashiwazaki	Echigo Line	Terminus
Location
- Location within JR Shinetsu Main Line Location within JR Hakushin Line Location within JR Echigo Line Location within BRT Bandai-bashi Line Location within Niigata city Location within Niigata Prefecture Location within Japan

Niigata Station (新潟駅, Niigata-eki) is a major railway station in Hanazono 1-chome, Chūō-ku, Niigata, Japan, operated by East Japan Railway Company (JR East). The station is in the center of Niigata City, the largest city on the Sea of Japan coast in Honshu. It forms the central station for the railway infrastructure along the Sea of Japan coast, and is also the terminus of the Jōetsu Shinkansen high-speed line from Tokyo. Niigata station has the largest passenger figure on the west coast of Honshu.

== Lines ==
Niigata Station is served by the following lines.

- Joetsu Shinkansen
- Shin'etsu Main Line
- Hakushin Line
- Echigo Line

== Station layout ==
The station has five island platforms on the elevated floor. Five tracks on the north side, the platforms 1/2, 3/4 and the track 5 are serving for the conventional narrow gauge lines. The opposing side of the track 5 on the center platform is solely used for the passengers transferring between Shinkansen trains on track 11 and the conventional line super express services. The two more elevated island platforms are serving four shinkansen tracks (11 to 14). The elevated station building has a "Midori no Madoguchi" staffed ticket counter and "View Plaza" travel agency.

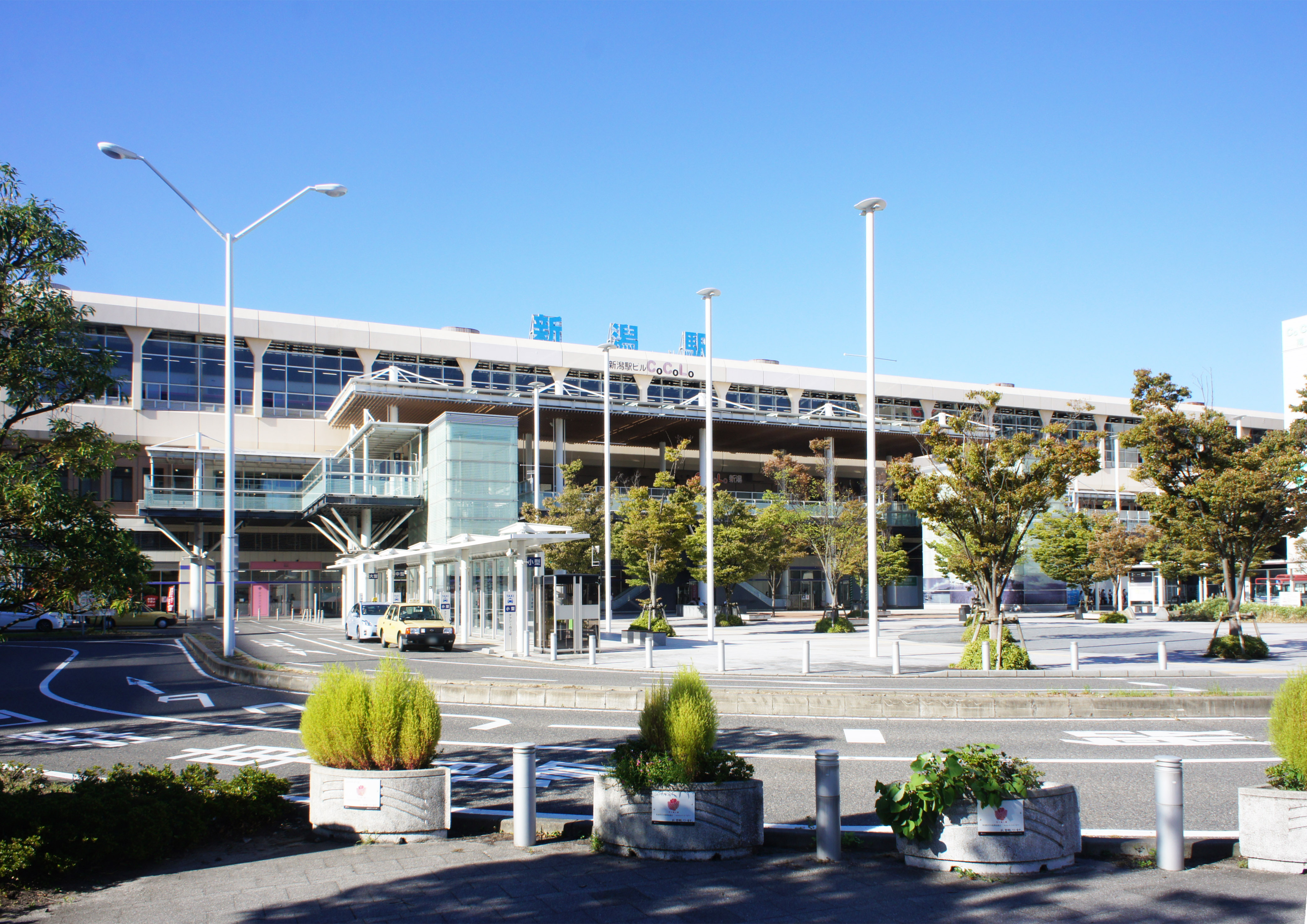
South (Shinkansen) side, in 2021

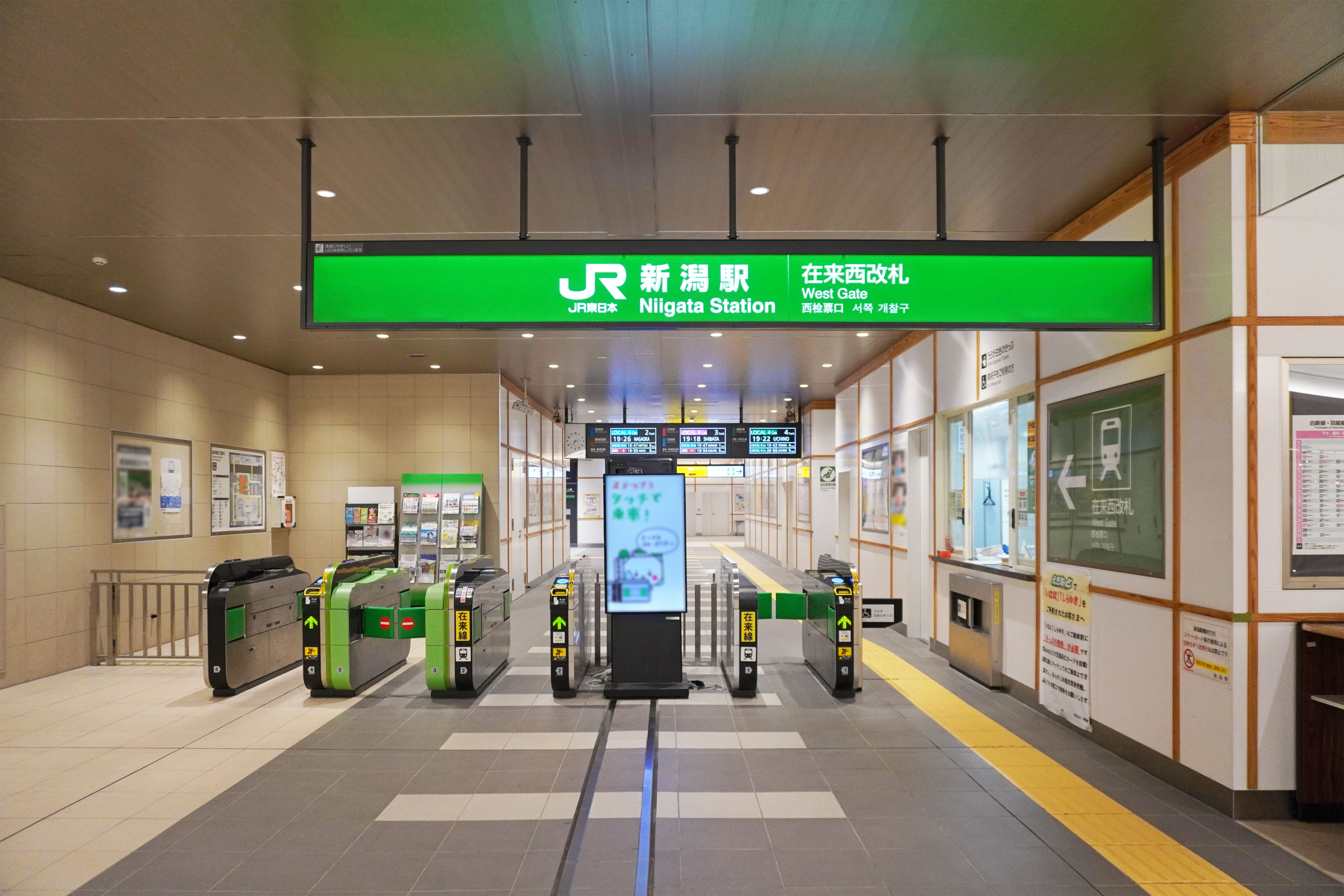
West Gate for conventional lines

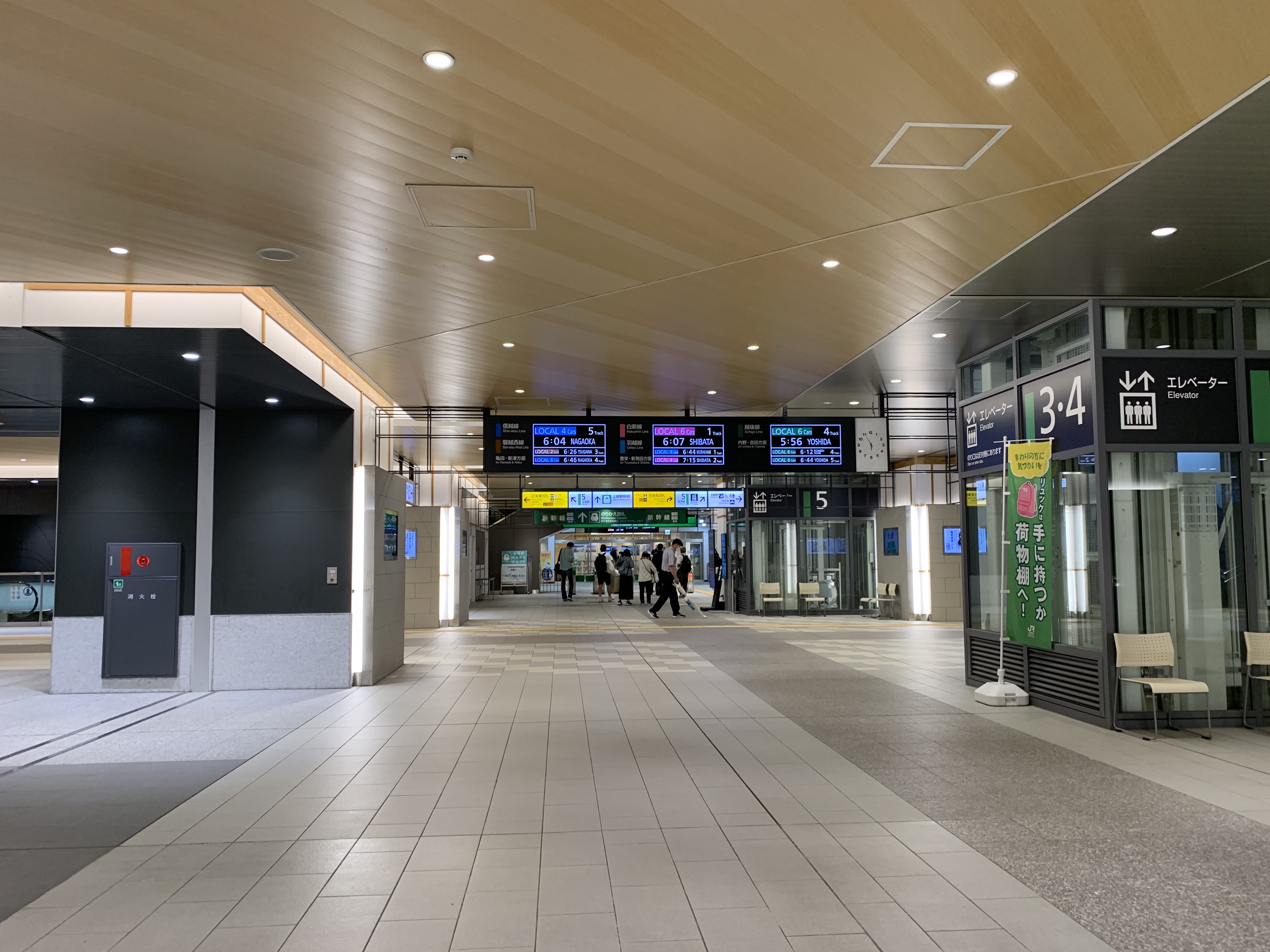
Concourse for conventional lines, with the Shinkansen transfer gate in the distance

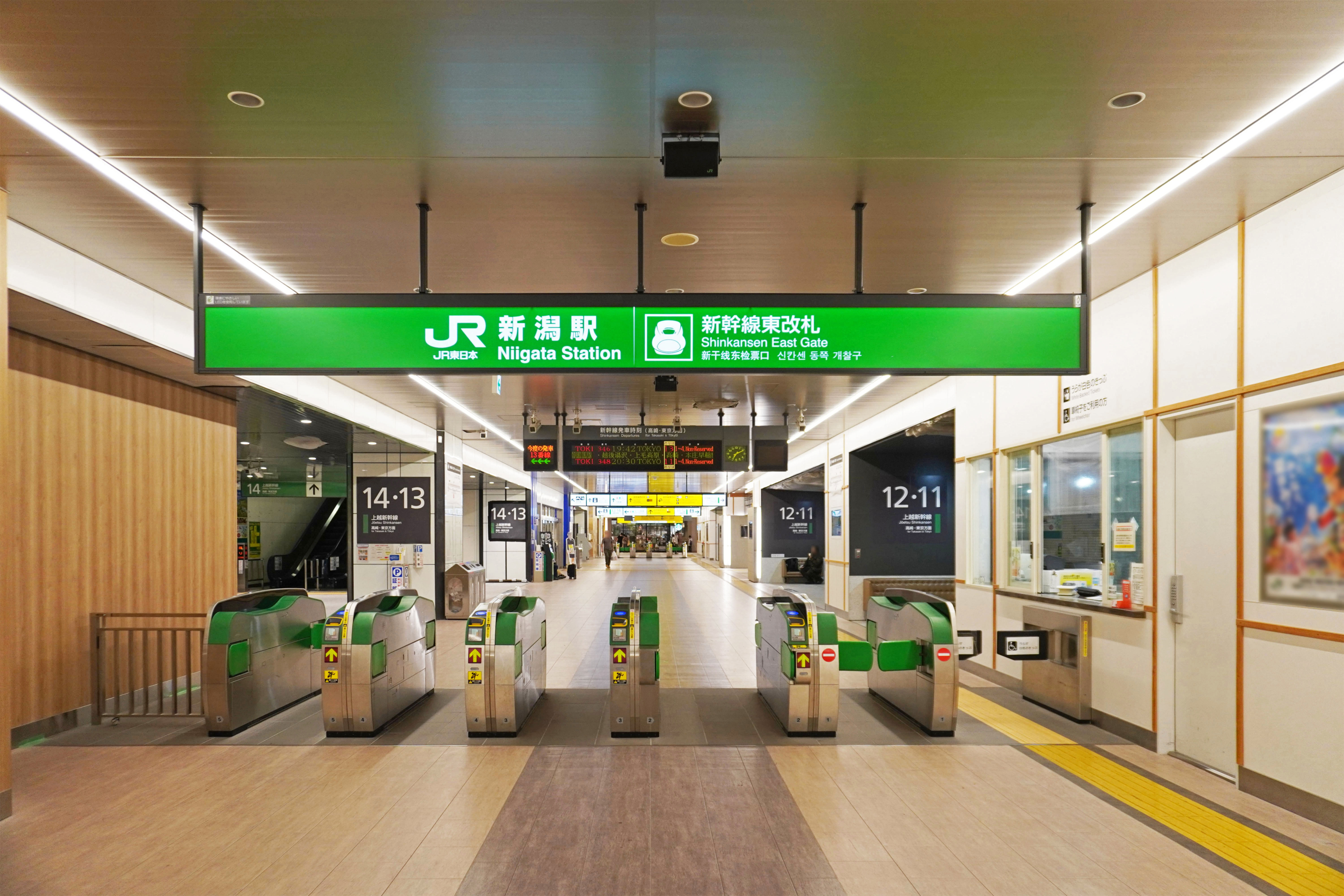
Shinkansen East Gate

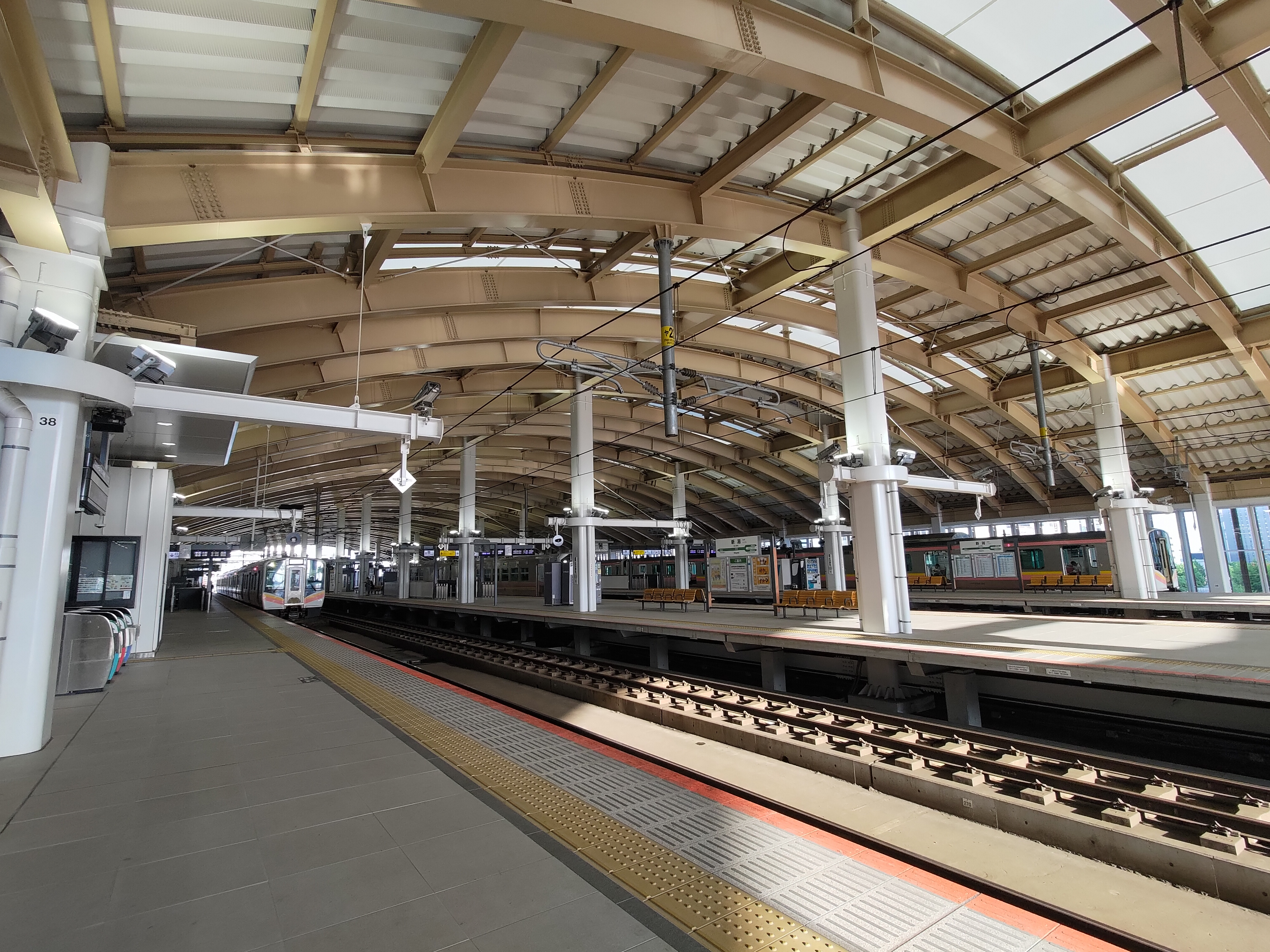
Train shed for conventional lines

=== Platforms ===
1-5	■ Shinetsu Line	for Niitsu, Nagaoka, and Tsugawa
1-5	■ Ban'etsu West Line	for Gosen and Aizu-Wakamatsu
1-5	■ Hakushin Line	for Shibata and Murakami
1-5	■ Uetsu Main Line	for Shibata and Murakami
1-5	■ Echigo Line	for Yoshida and Kashiwazaki
11-14	■ Joetsu Shinkansen	for Takasaki, Ōmiya, and Tokyo

== History ==
Niigata Station opened on 3 May 1904. With the privatization of Japanese National Railways (JNR) on 1 April 1987, the station came under the control of JR East.

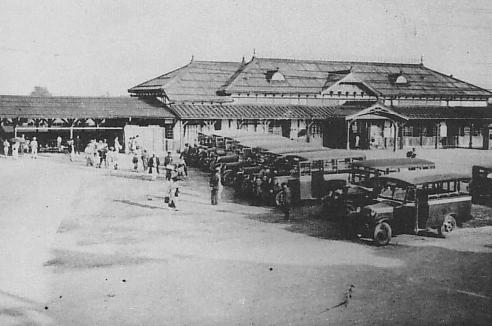
Pre-1935 station building during the early Shōwa era

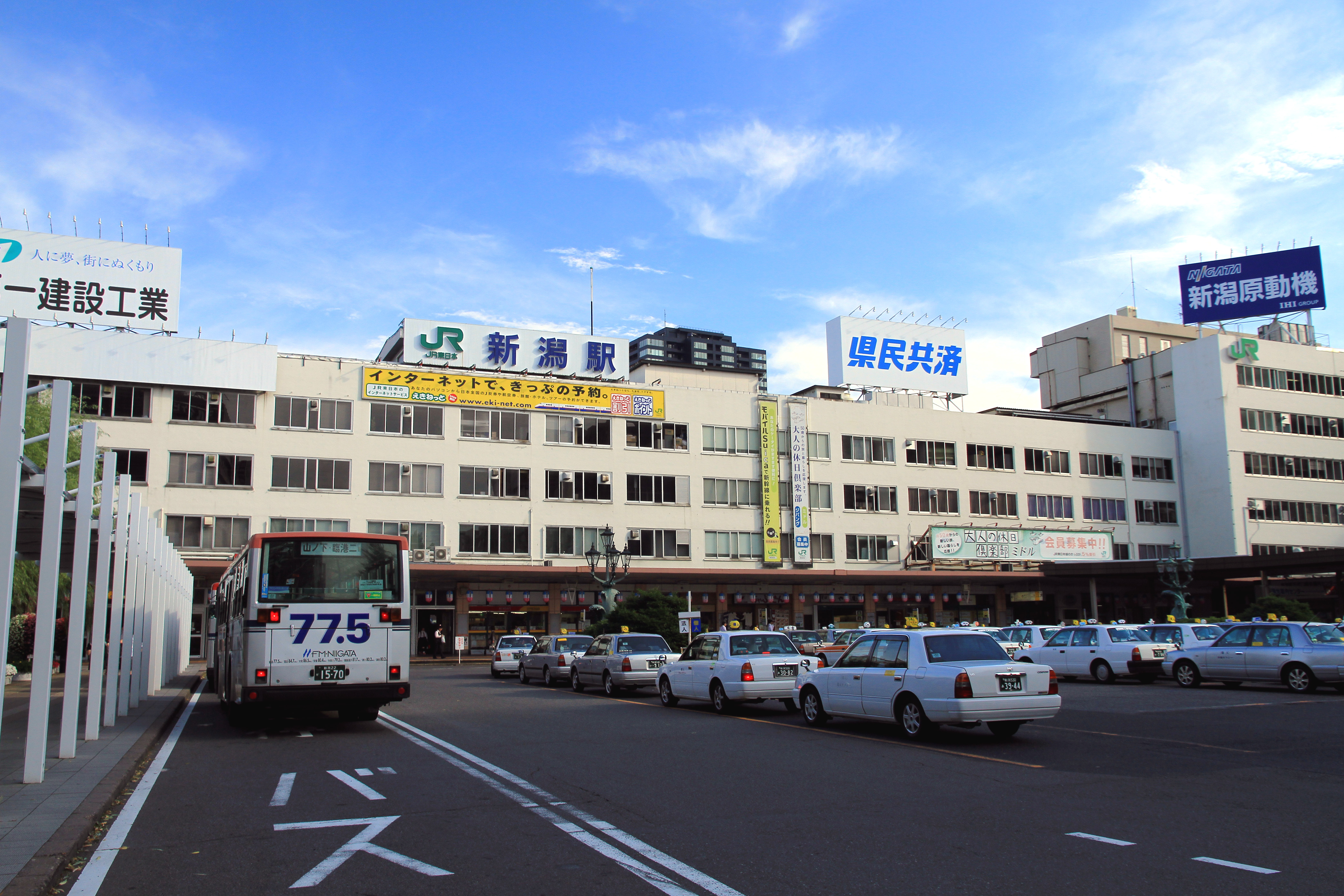
1958/1963 station building, in 2011

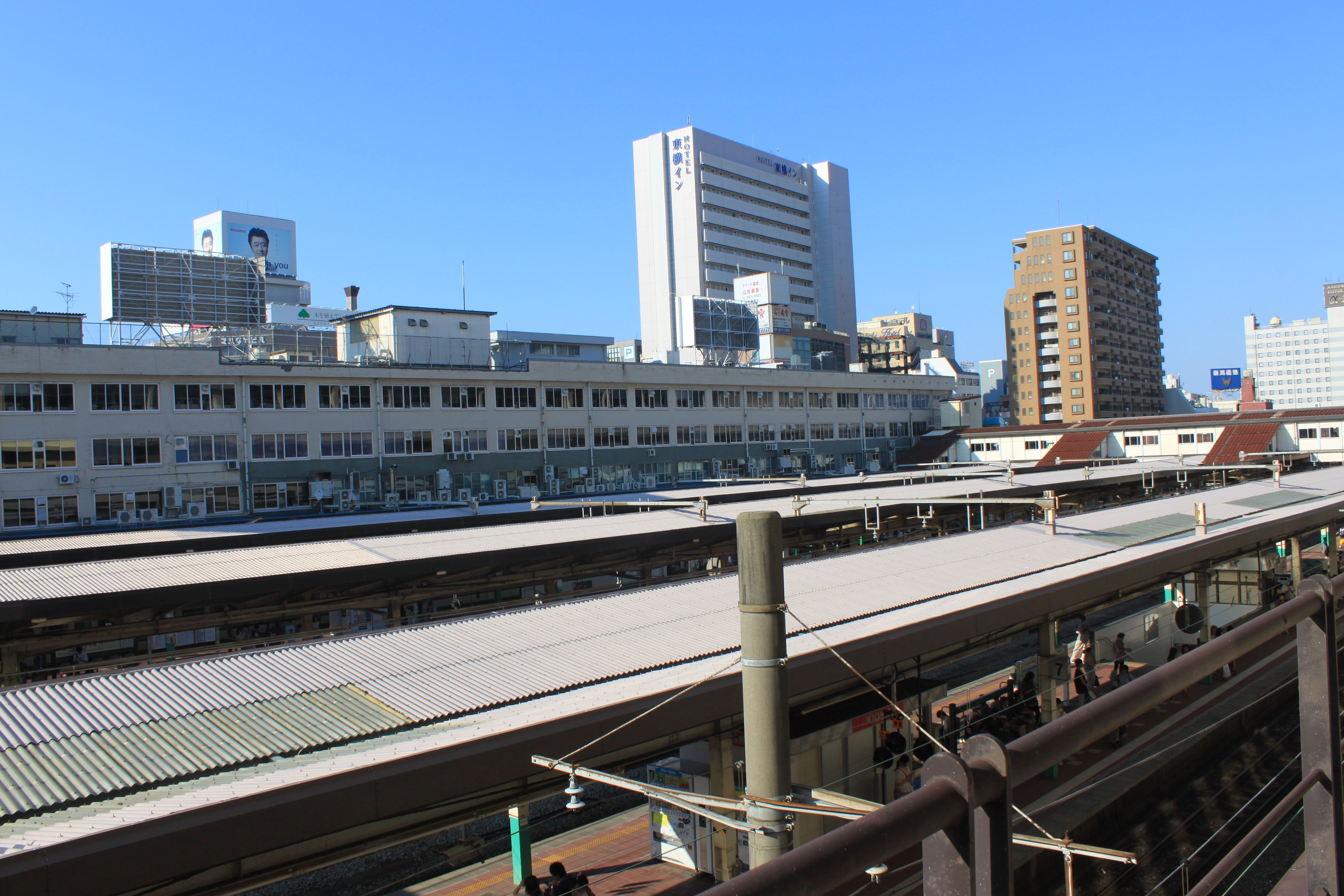
Surface-level conventional line platforms, in 2011

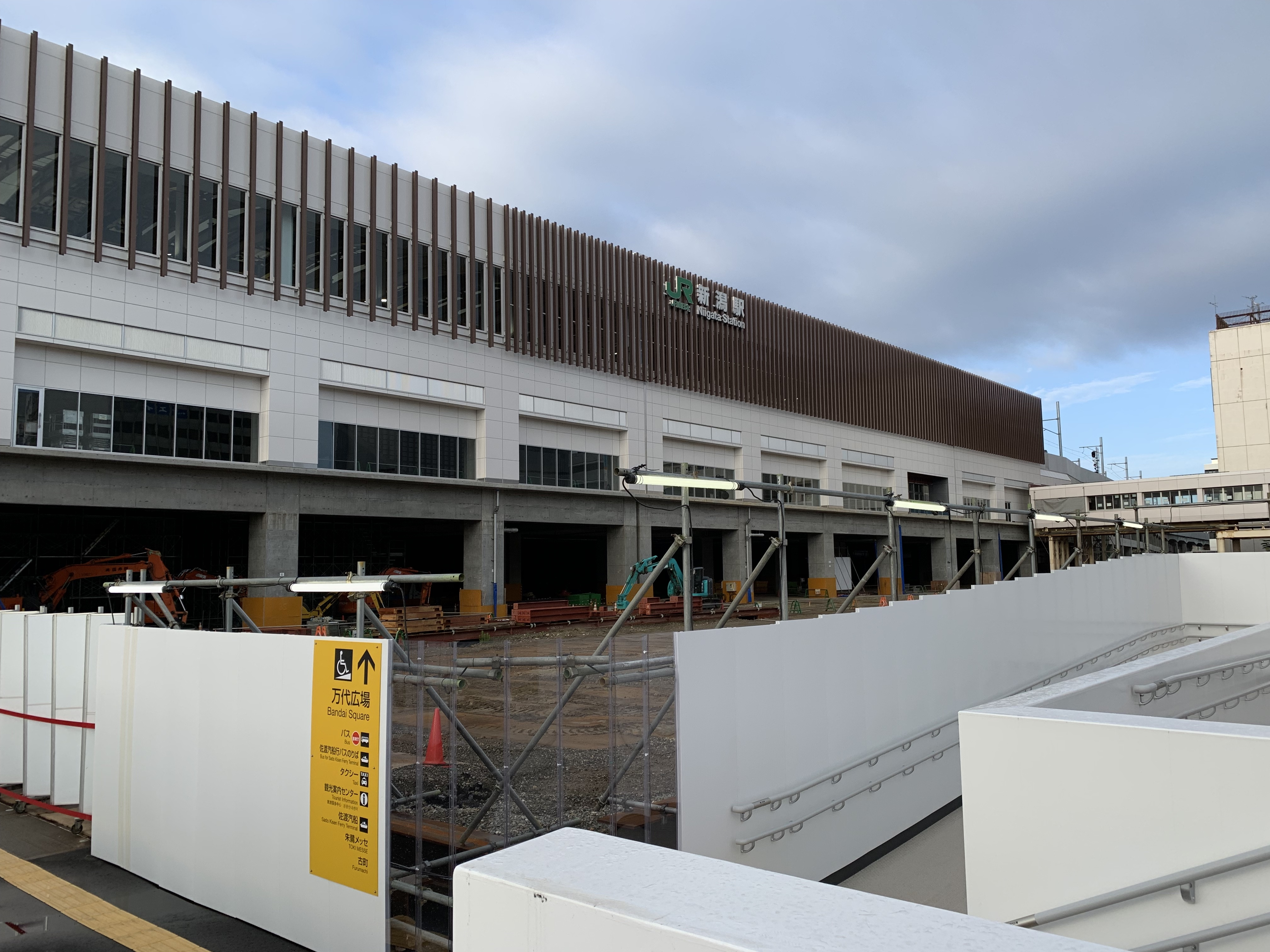
New station building under construction, June 2022

== Passenger statistics ==
In fiscal 2017, the station was used by an average of 37,461 passengers daily (boarding passengers only). The passenger figures for previous years are as shown below.

Fiscal year	Daily average
2000	36,894
2001	37,185
2002	37,407
2003	37,612
2004	36,300
2005	37,050
2006	36,769
2007	36,849
2008	37,012
2009	36,396
2010	36,269
2011	36,711
2011	37,446

== Surrounding area ==
- CoCoLo Niigata, shopping center in the station
- Sake Museum Ponshu-kan
- National Route 7
- National Route 8
- Bandai Bridge
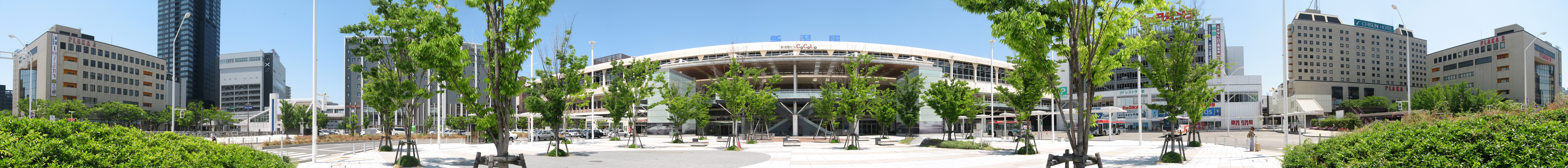
A panorama view of the South Entrance, June 2013

== Bus terminals ==
Both the Bandai Entrance and the South Entrance have bus terminals. As of February 2017, the following transit bus line are on service.

=== Bandaiguchi Bus Terminal ===
- Niigata City Loop Bus
- Transit bus operated by Niigata Kotsu
  - BRT "Bandai-bashi Line" : Niigata Sta.—Bandai Bridge—Furumachi—City office—Hakusan Station—Aoyama
  - C* : for Central Niigata
  - S* : for South Niigata
  - W* : for West Niigata
  - E* : for East Niigata
  - "Sado-Kisen Line" : Niigata Sta.—Toki Messe—Sado Kisen Ferry Terminal

=== Minamiguchi Bus Terminal ===
- Transit bus operated by Niigata Kotsu
  - Limousine bus for Niigata Airport
  - C* / S* / W* / E*
    - S7 : for Big Swan Stadium, Niigata Prefectural Baseball Stadium
