= Chūō-ku, Niigata =

Ward of Niigata City in Chūbu, Japan

Chuo-ku, Niigata 新潟市中央区
- Ward of Niigata
- 新潟市中央区
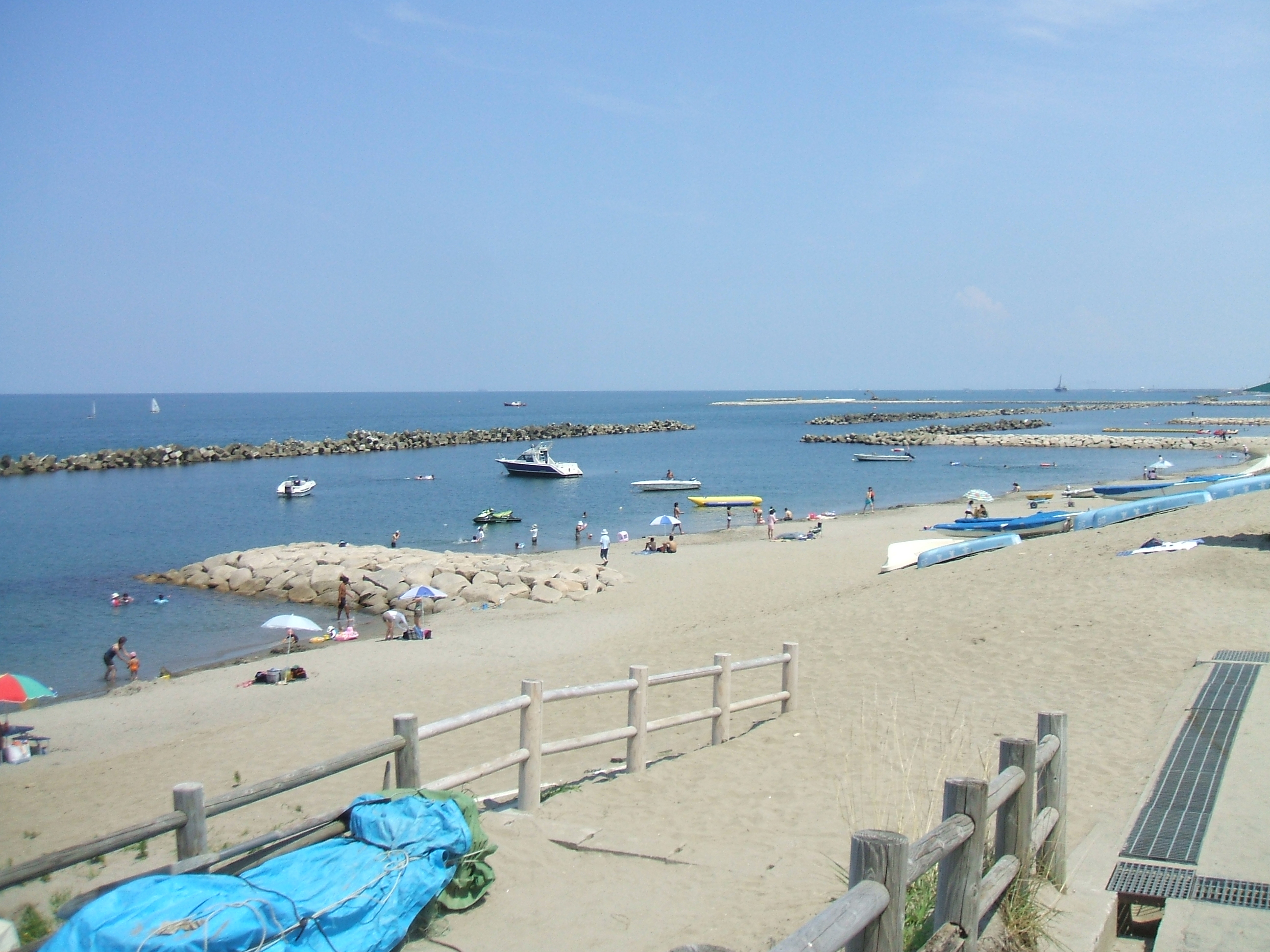
- Sekiyahama Beach

- Location of Chūō-ku in Niigata City

- Chuo-ku, Niigata (Niigata Prefecture) Chuo-ku, Niigata (Niigata city)
- Coordinates: 37°55′20.9″N 139°02′35.7″E
- Country: Japan
- Region: Kōshin'etsu, Hokuriku (Chūbu)
- Prefecture: Niigata
- City: Niigata
- Established: April 1, 2007

Area
  - Total: 37.75 km^{2} (14.58 sq mi)

Population (September 1, 2019)
  - Total: 183,231
  - Density: 4,854/km^{2} (12,570/sq mi)
- Time zone: UTC+9 (Japan Standard Time)
- Postal: 951-8550
- Address: Gakko-cho-dori 1-602-1, Chuo-ku, Niigata-shi, Niigata-ken
- Telephone Number: 025-223-1000
- Website: Official website

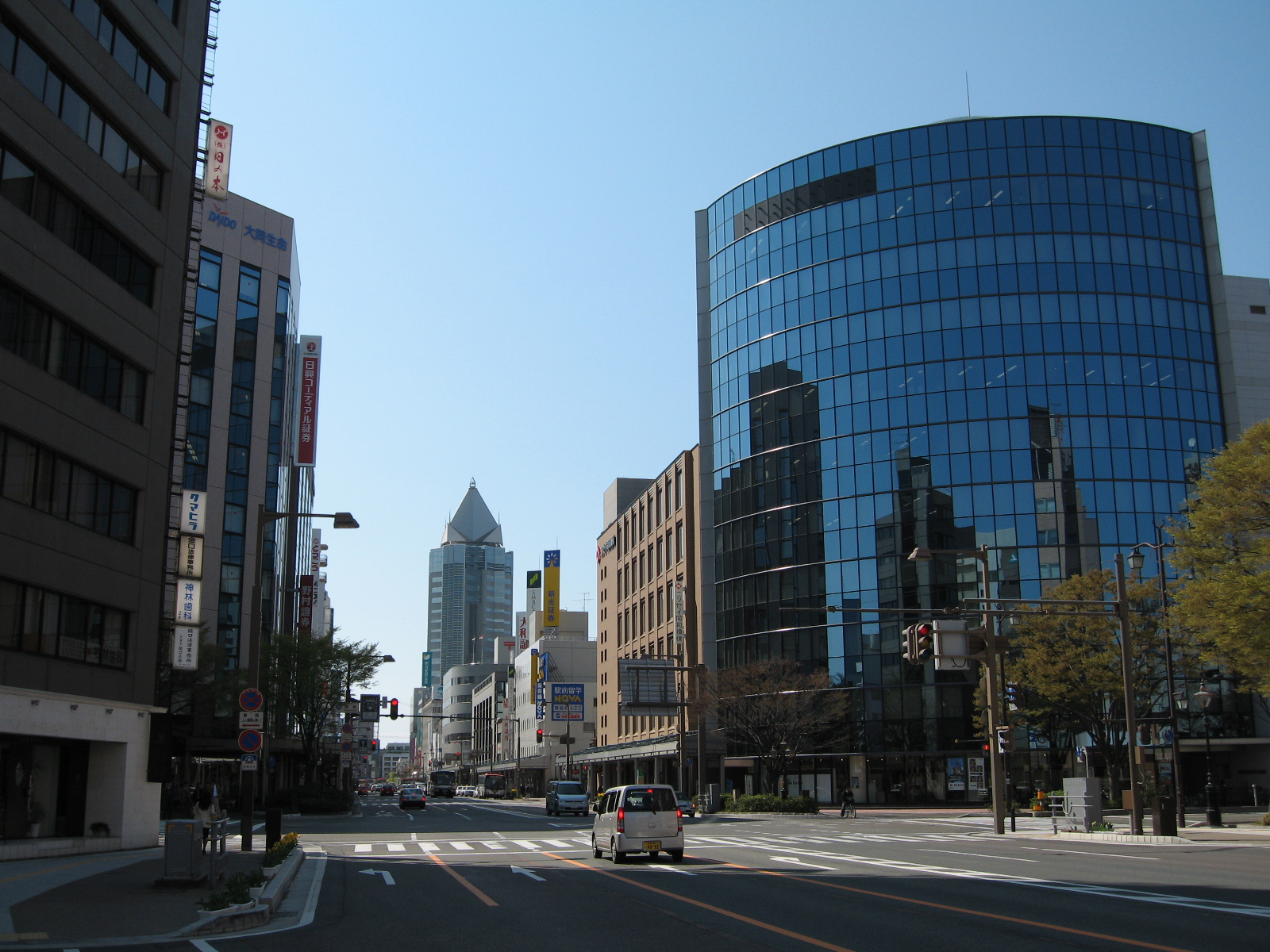
View of the Furumachi business district, along Masaya-koji. Next21 is the spired-building in background.

Chūō-ku (中央区, Chūō-ku) is one of the eight wards of Niigata City, Niigata Prefecture, in the Hokuriku region of Japan. It comprises much of the city centre. As of 1 September 2018, the ward had an estimated population of 183,231 in 87,162 households and a population density of 4,900 persons per km^{2}. The total area of the ward was 37.75 square kilometres (14.58 sq mi).

== Geography ==
Chūō-ku is located in the approximate centre of Niigata City, bounded by the Sea of Japan to the north and the Nihonkai-Tōhoku Expressway to the south. The area comprises the old city as well as the Sonoki (曽野木), Nuttari (沼垂), Toyano (鳥屋野) and the Yamagata (山潟) districts.

=== Neighboring municipalities/wards ===
- Niigata Prefecture
  - Higashi-ku, Niigata
  - Kōnan-ku, Niigata
  - Nishi-ku, Niigata

== Neighborhoods ==
=== Central Business District ===
Chūō-ku is the heart of Niigata in terms of economic and political importance. The City Office is located here along with several central government and prefectural agencies. Japan's national broadcaster NHK has its prefectural TV station and radio station in Chūō-ku. There are several company head offices based in the district. It is also the site of old Niigata City which extends from Niigata Station downtown to Bandai Bridge and Furumachi.

==== Furumachi ====
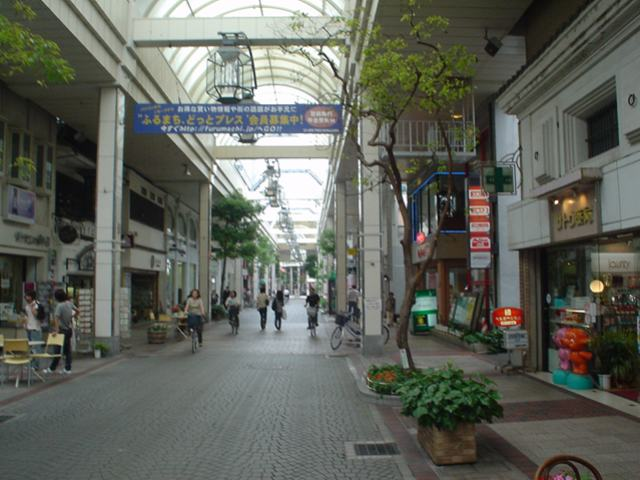
Furumachi-dori Shopping Mall, Niigata City

Furumachi in Niigata city is located on left bank of Shinano River across Bandai Bridge. It lies on Niigata Island and faces the Sea of Japan. The area has been developed around Masaya-koji, which is a wide six-lane thoroughfare connecting Furumachi with Niigata Station. Furumachi has business districts as well as several historic parts. Narrow alleyways and streets crisscross beneath the modern office buildings. The historic Honcho market is also here. Much of the area contains modern buildings. This is because Furumachi was rebuilt after an earthquake devastated this part of eastern Niigata in 1964. This is in marked contrast with areas on the west side of the river which still retain traditional-looking streets containing older houses.

== History ==
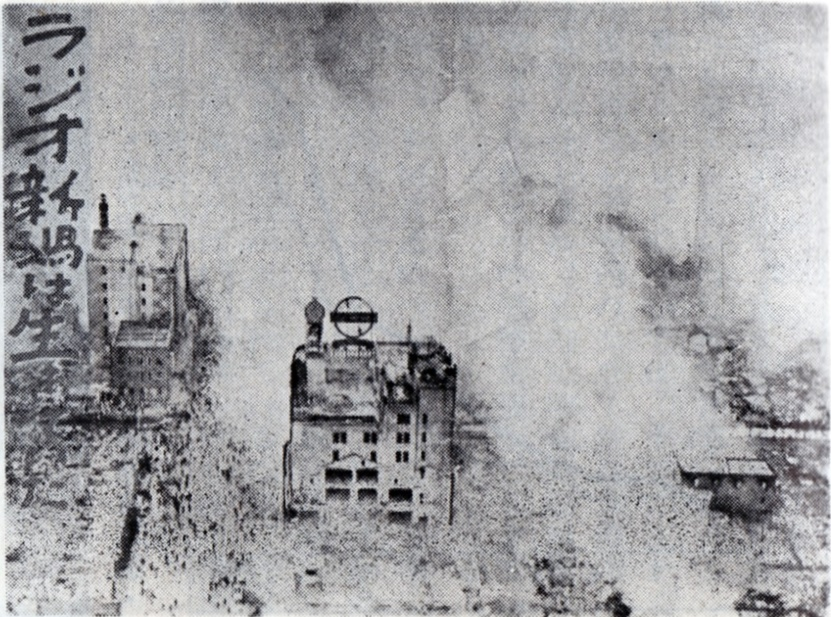
Picture shown by aftermath of 1955 Great Niigata Fire in downtown area, according to the official confirmed report, kills one person with injuries 235

The area of present-day Chūō-ku was part of ancient Echigo Province, and developed as a port town for Nagaoka Domain under the Edo period Tokugawa Shogunate. Niigata was one of the ports opened to foreign trade by the 1858 Harris Treaty. Modern Niigata city was created with the establishment of the municipalities system on April 1, 1889. The Hokuetsu Railway commented Niigata to Tokyo in 1897, and the first Bandai Bridge across the Shinano River was completed in 1908, shortly before the city was destroyed by a fire. The city escaped serious damage in World War II; however, much of the city burned down in a fire in 1955 and again suffered from damage in the 1964 Niigata earthquake.

Niigata became a government-designated city on April 1, 2007, and was divided into wards, with the new Chūō Ward consisting of much of the central business portion of the city.

== Education ==
=== Universities ===
- Niigata University (Asahimachi Campus / Nishi-Ohata Campus)
- Niigata Seiryo University
- The Nippon Dental University (Niigata)

=== Secondary education ===
Chūō-ku has five public high schools operated by the Niigata Prefectural Board of Education, two public high schools operated by the Niigata City Board of Education, three private high schools and one private combined middle school/high school. The ward also has ten public middle schools operated by the city government.

== Transportation ==
=== Railway ===
JR East – Jōetsu Shinkansen

- Niigata

JR East – Shin'etsu Main Line

- Niigata

JR East – Hakushin Line

- Niigata

JR East – Echigo Line

- Niigata - Kamitokoro – Hakusan - Sekiya

=== Transit bus ===
- Niigata City Loop Bus
- Transit bus operated by Niigata Kotsu
  - BRT "Bandai-bashi Line" : Niigata Sta.—Bandai Bridge—Furumachi—City office—Hakusan Sta.—(Aoyama)
  - C* : for Central Niigata
  - S* : for South Niigata
  - W* : for West Niigata
  - E* : for East Niigata
  - "Sado-Kisen Line" : Niigata Sta.—Toki Messe—Sado Kisen Ferry Terminal

=== Highways ===
- National Route 7
- National Route 8
- National Route 49
- National Route 113
- National Route 116
- National Route 402

=== Ports ===
- Sado Kisen Ferry Terminal

=== Water Shuttle ===
- Shinanogawa Water Shuttle: MINATOPIA – Toki Messe – Bandai Bridge – Bandai City – Niigata Prefectural office – (FURUSATO VILLAGE)

== Local attractions ==
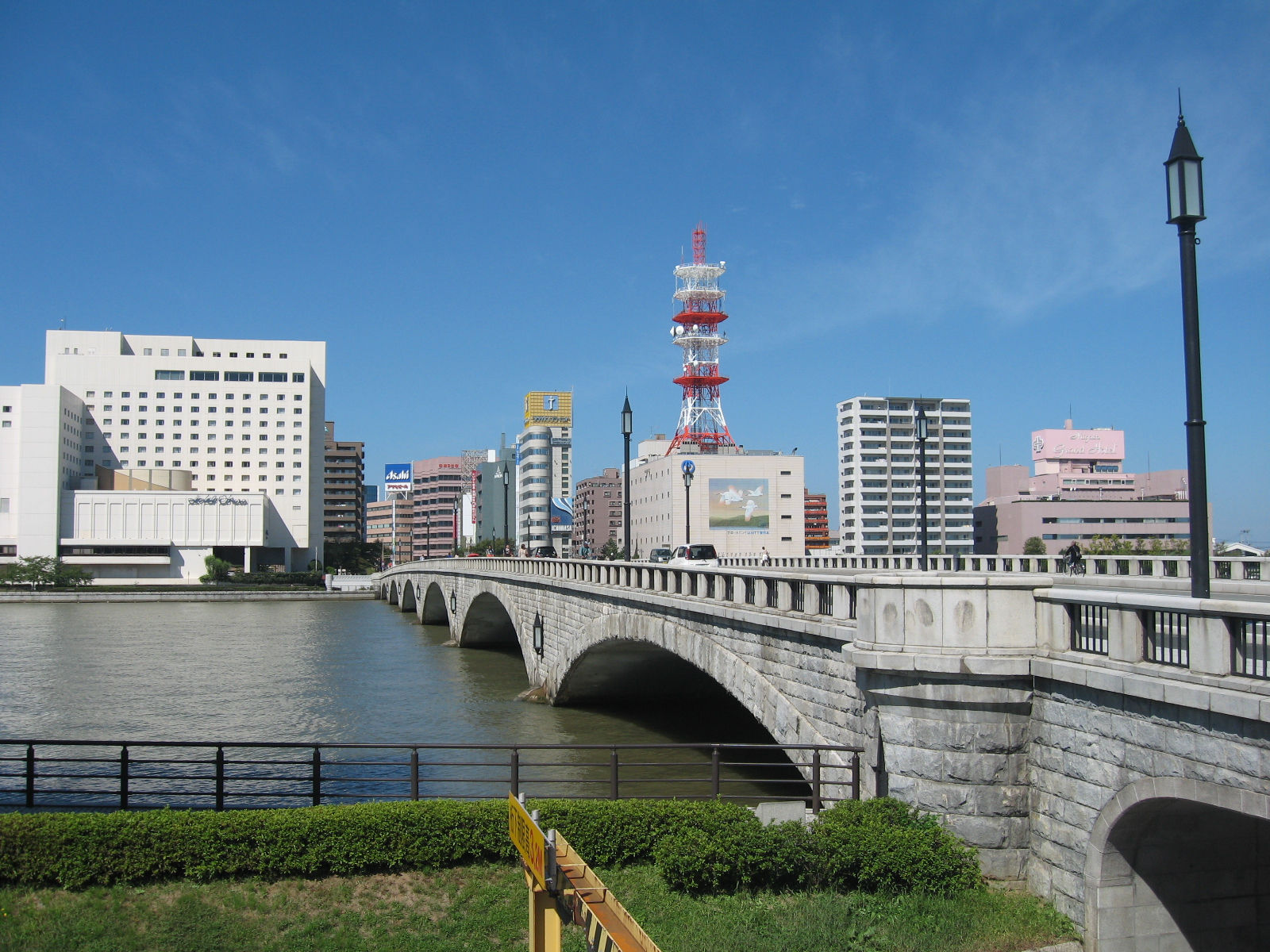
Bandai Bridge

=== West side of the Shinano River ===
- Niigata City History Museum (Minatopia)
- The Niigata Saitou Villa
- Hakusan Park
- Niigata-City Performing Arts Center (Ryutopia)
- Niigata Prefectural Civic Center
- Niigata city Aquarium (Marinepia Nihonkai)
- Next21 skyscraper
- Kotohira Shrine
- Furumachi-dori Shopping Mall
- Honcho-dori Shopping Mall
- Ninjo-Yokocho Shopping Mall
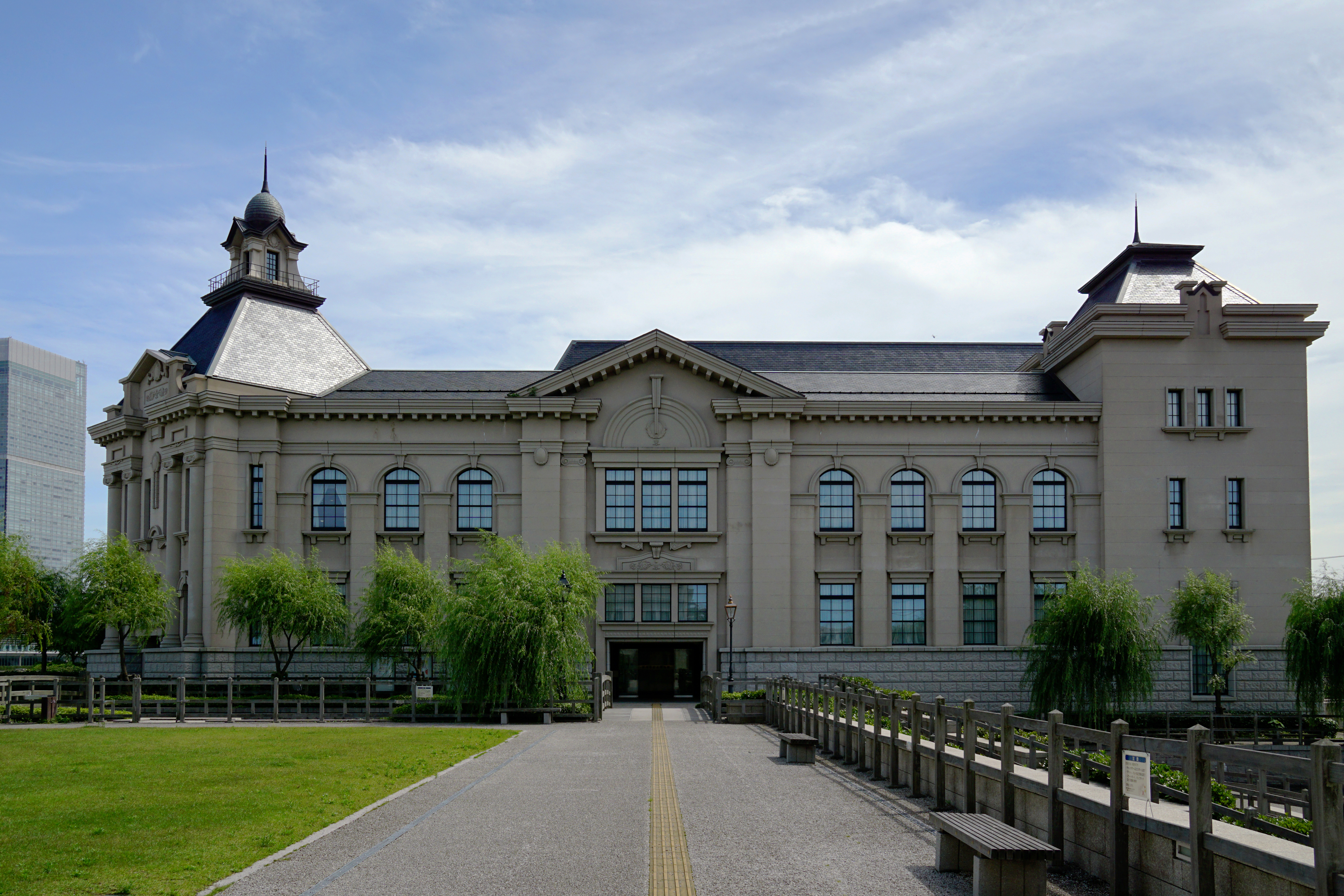
Minatopia

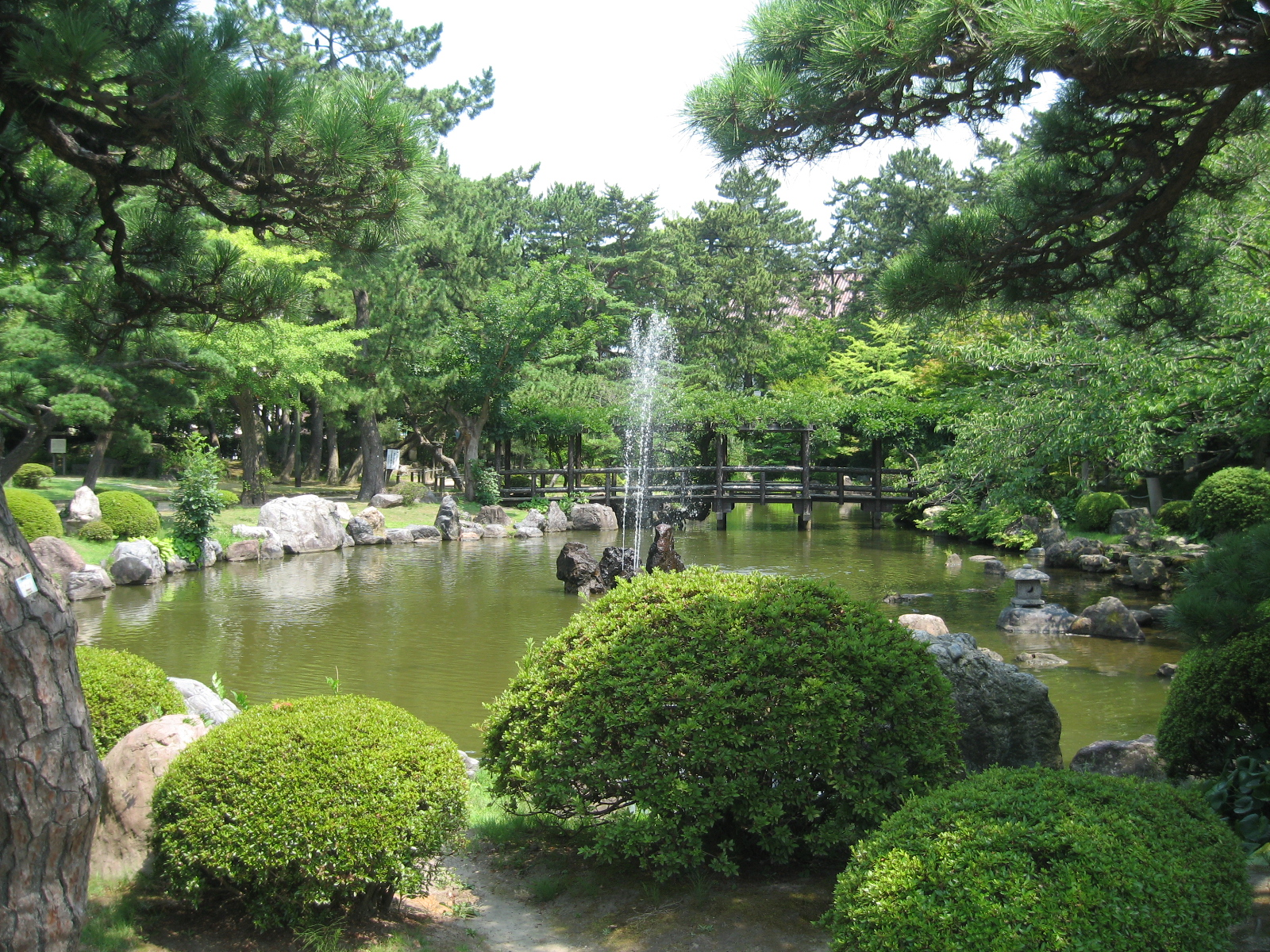
Hakusan Park

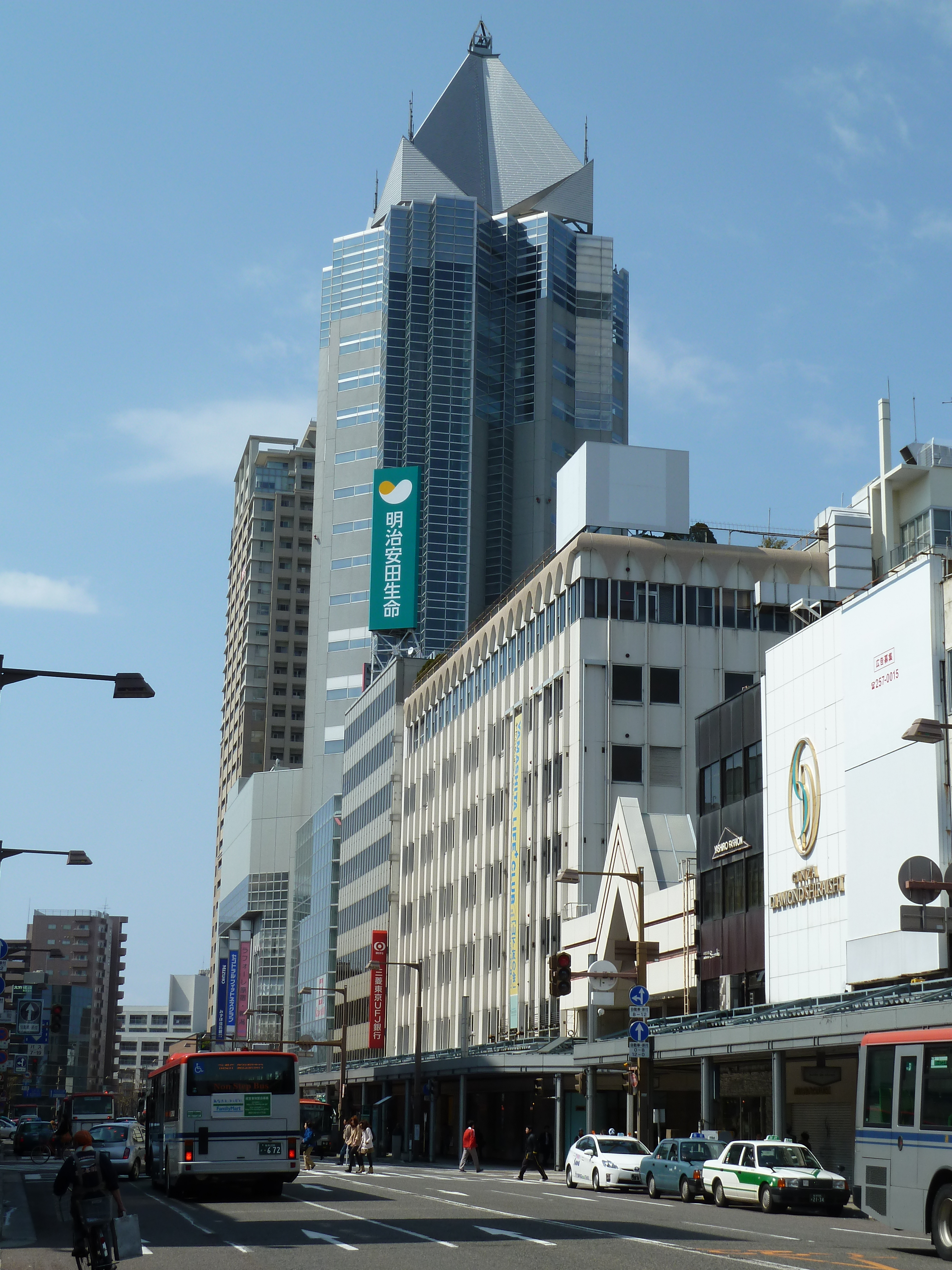
Next21 in Furumachi

=== East side of the Shinano River ===
- Niigata Station
- Sake Museum Ponshu-kan
- Bandai City shopping district
- LoveLa Shopping Mall
- LoveLa2 Shopping Mall
- Niigata Manga & Animation Museum
- NGT48 Idol unit
- Niigata Nippo Media Ship
- Toki Messe
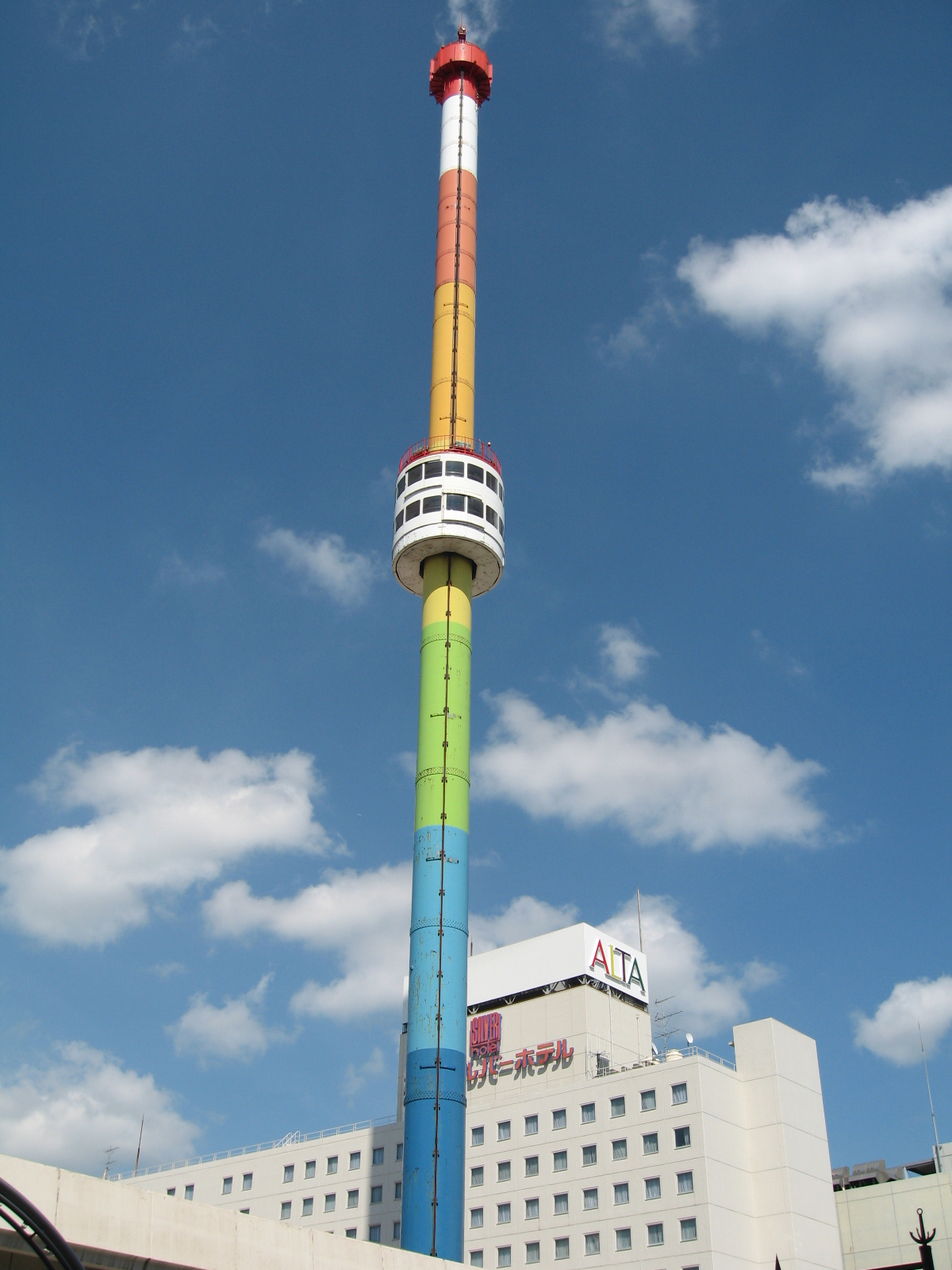
Rainbow Tower, the symbol of Bandai City

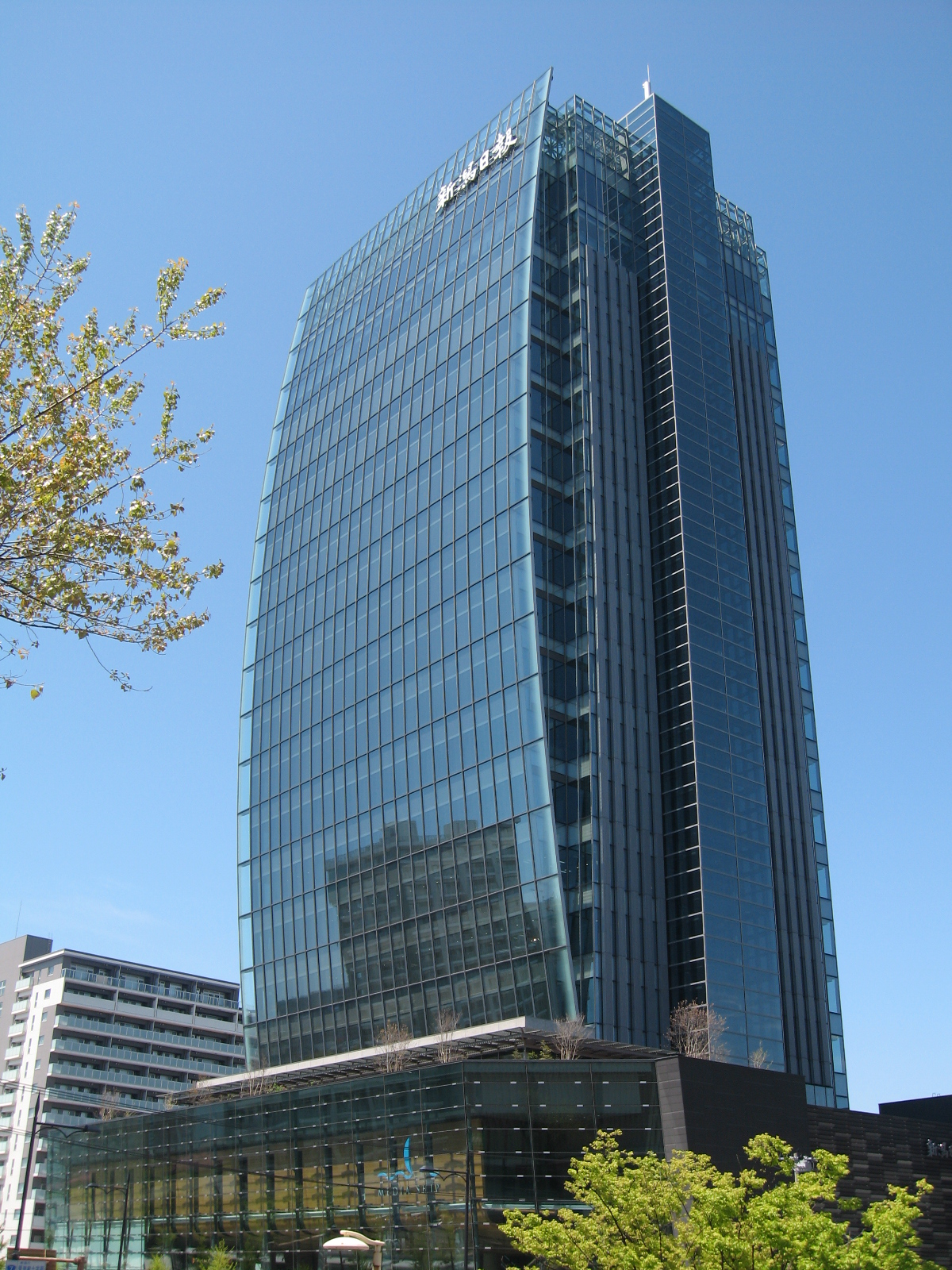
Media Ship

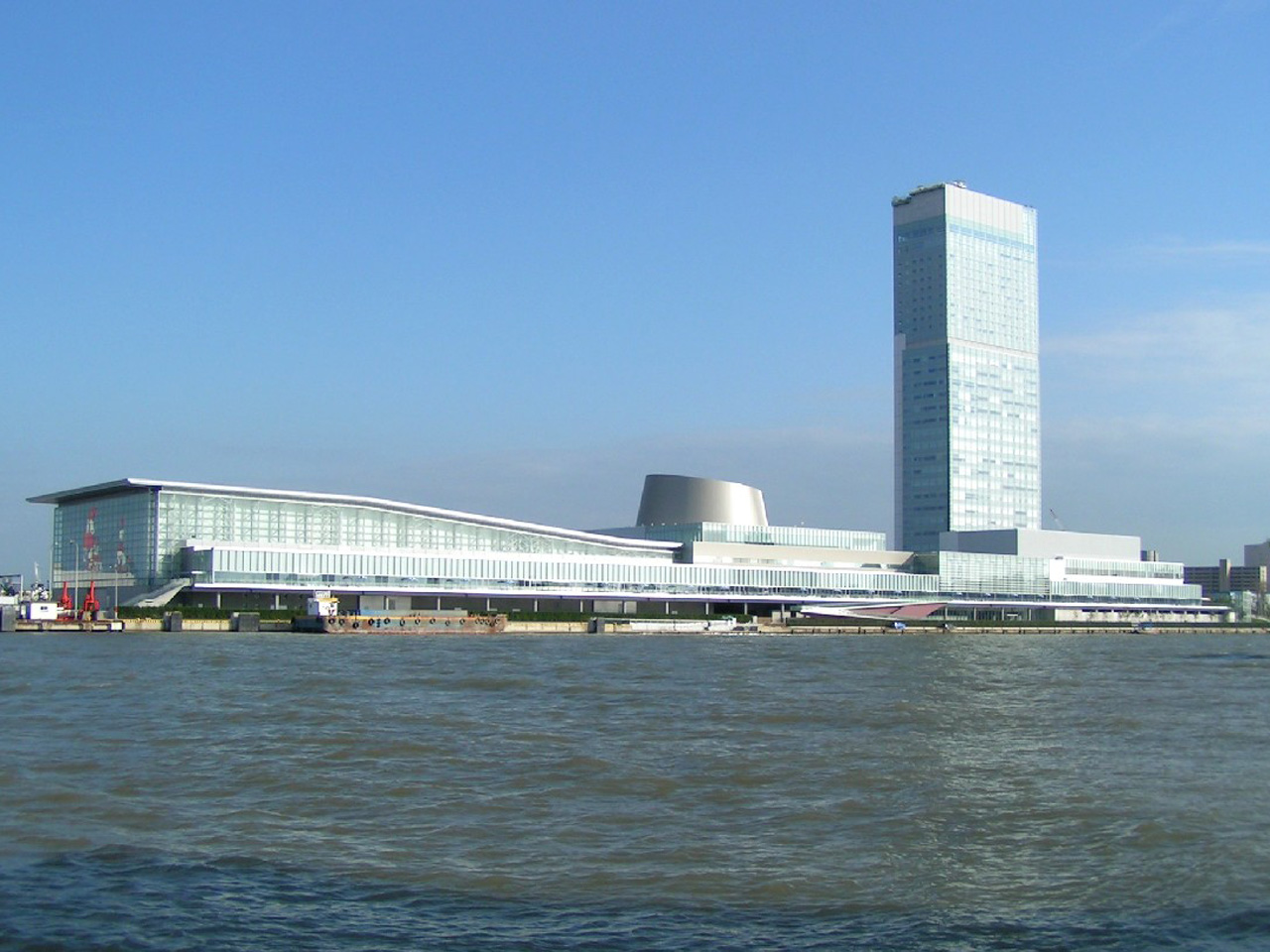
Toki Messe (Niigata Convention center)

=== South side of the Toyanogata Lagoon ===
- Big Swan Stadium
- Niigata Prefectural Baseball Stadium
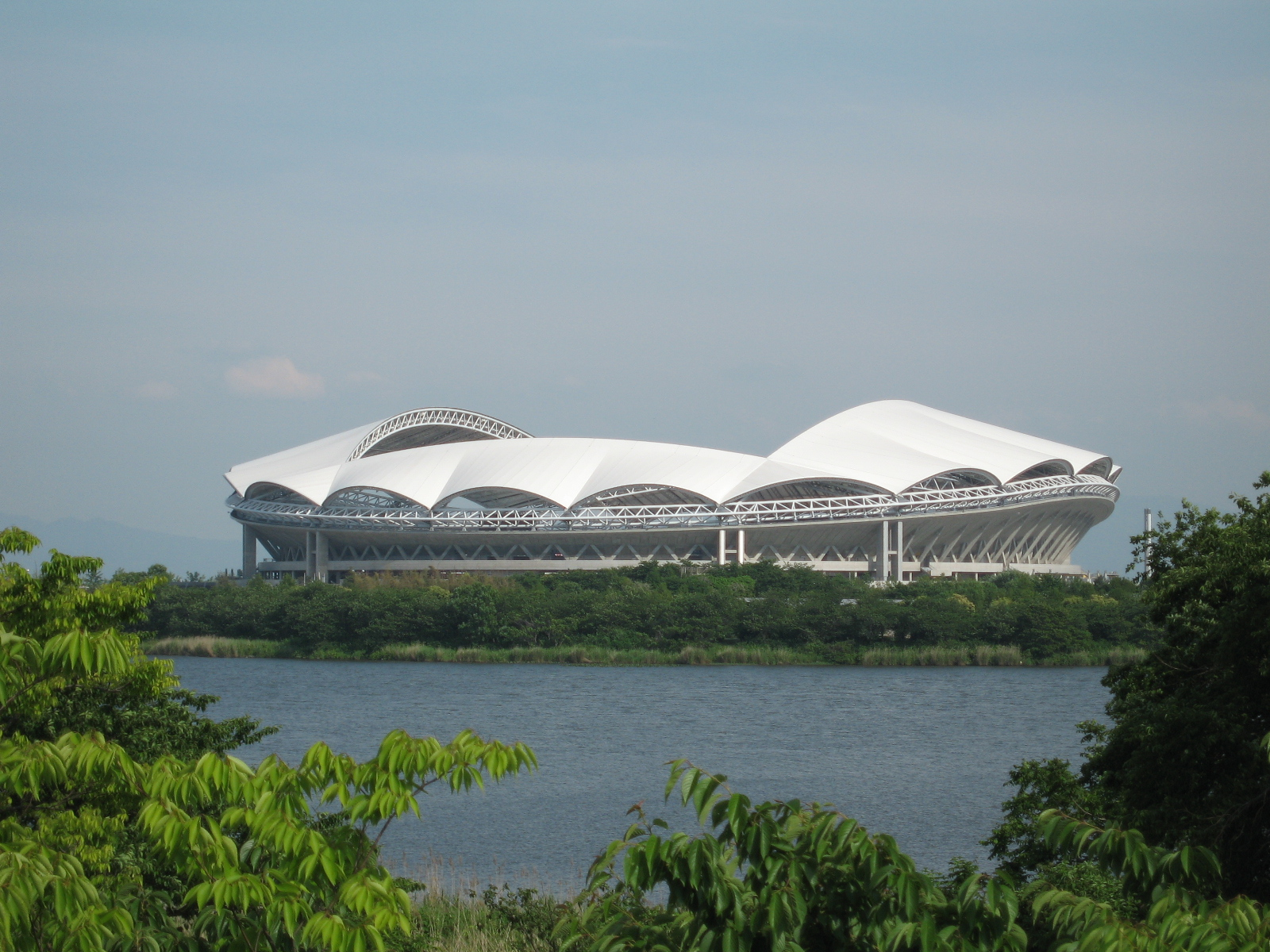
Big Swan Stadium and Toyanogata Lagoon

=== Events ===
- Niigata Festival (every August)
- Niigata Comic Market
- Niigata Manga Competition

== See also ==
- Niigata city
