= Ryuto =

Contactless smart card system in Niigata, Japan

- Location: Niigata
- Launched: April 24, 2011
- Currency: Japanese yen (¥20,000 maximum load)
- Validity: Niigata Kotsu
- Website: niigata-kotsu.co.jp/ryuto

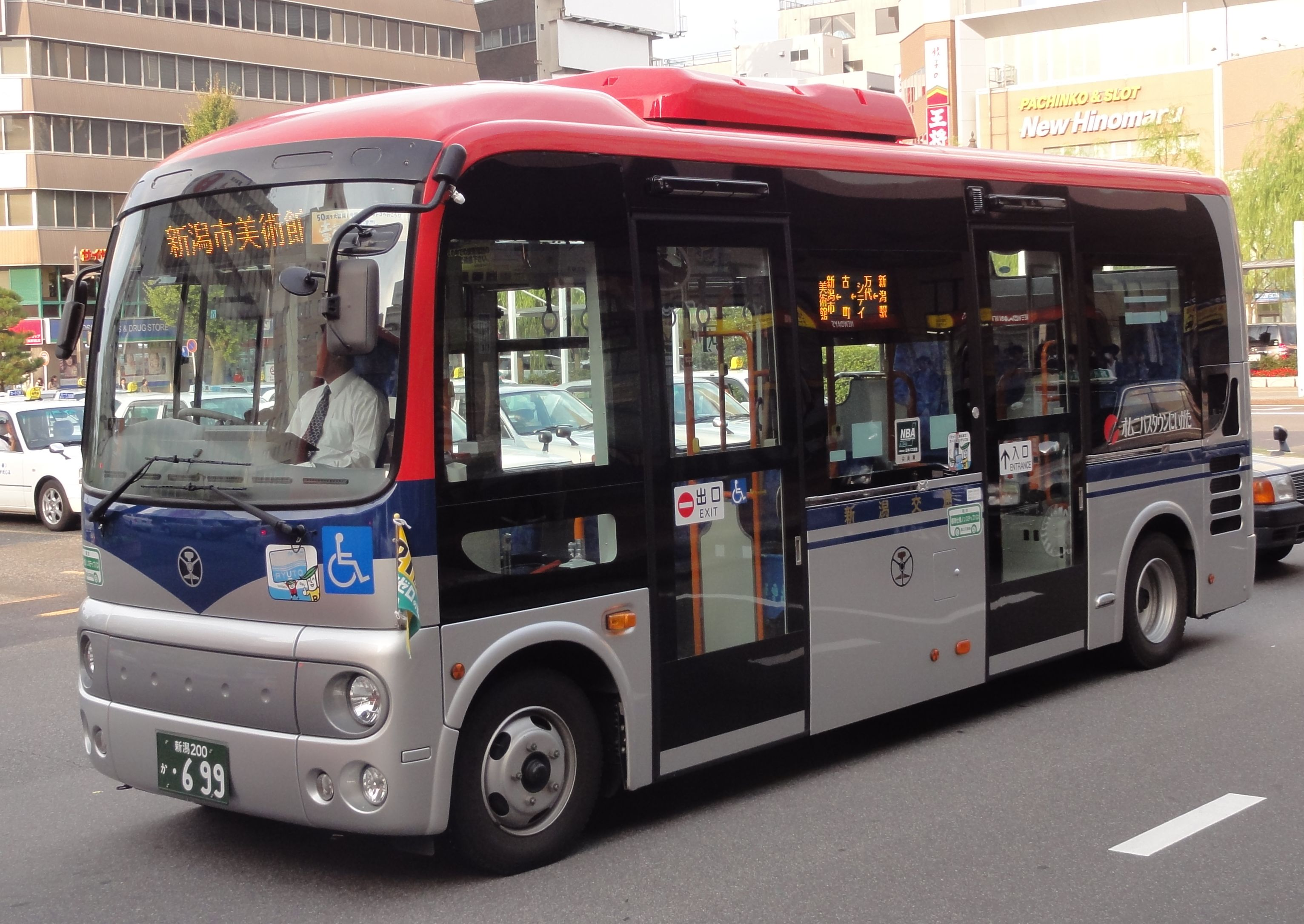
Niigata Kotsu bus with Ryuto logo

Ryuto (りゅーと, Ryūto) is a rechargeable contactless smart card ticketing system for public transport in Niigata, Japan, introduced by Niigata Kotsu.

== Usable area ==
As of 2024, the card is usable on most of the bus lines operated by Niigata Kotsu. The card cannot be used on JR lines.

== Points of purchase ==
- Niigata Kotsu sales offices
- On-board buses
