= Bandai-bashi Line =

Bus route in Niigata, Japan

Bandai-bashi Line (B1)
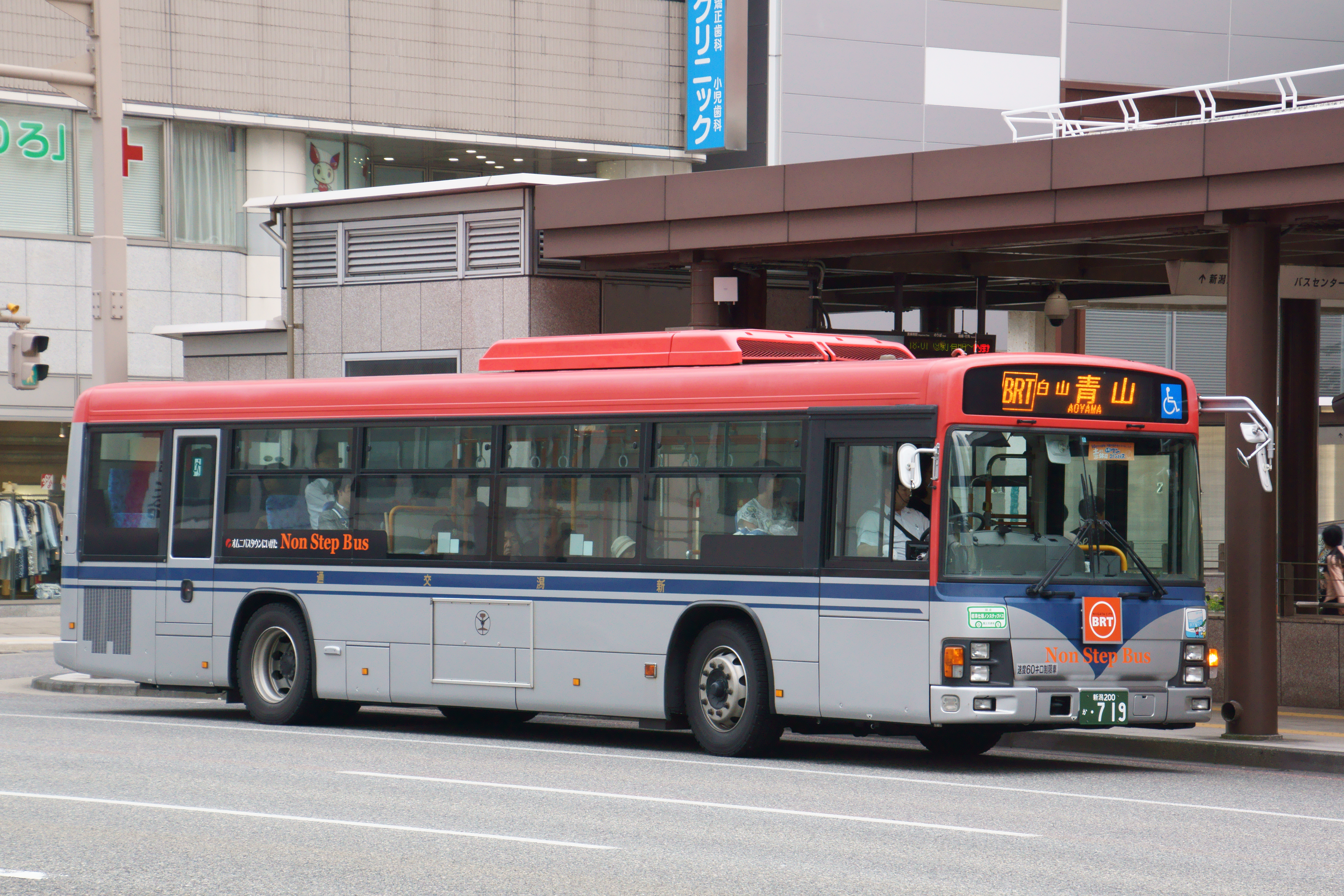

Overview
- Operator: Niigata Kotsu
- Began service: September 5, 2015

Route
- Locale: Niigata
- Start: Niigata Station
- Via: Bandai Bridge Furumachi
- End: Aoyama
- Length: 7 km

Service
- Frequency: Weekdays: every 3-10 mins Weekends: every 10 mins
- Journey time: 30 minutes
- Operates: 5:45 am - 12:00 am
- Ridership: 9,222 (May 2018)
- Timetable: Niigata Kotsu
Route map
Prior to December 22, 2023 the line was also known as Niigata BRT

Bandai-bashi Line (萬代橋ライン), line number B1, also formerly known as Niigata BRT, is a bus line in Niigata, Niigata Prefecture, Japan, which operates between Niigata Station and Aoyama. It is operated by bus operator Niigata Kotsu for Niigata City (local government). The route was introduced on September 5, 2015 as part of Niigata New Bus System, a major reorganisation of bus routes in Niigata City.

== Routes ==
The following table lists the bus routes operating on the Bandai-bashi Line. All routes operated from the line's commencement on September 5, 2015, with the exception of route B12 which commenced on March 31, 2024.

Printed timetables listed these route numbers, but buses and bus stop signage instead displayed "BRT". With the abolishment of the BRT branding on December 22, 2023, buses and bus stops are now showing the relevant route number.

B1 Bandai-bashi Line - Bus Routes (As of December 2024)
Route	Description	Comments	Trip time
B10	Niigata Station - Aoyama		29–32 minutes
B10快	Niigata Station - Aoyama	Rapid service	26–28 minutes
B11	Aoyama Honmura - Aoyama - Niigata Station	1 morning trip only.	38 minutes
B12	City Hall - Niigata Station => Route S61	Most trips continue past Niigata Station onto route S61, providing a north-south through service. Commenced March 31, 2024.	16 minutes
B13	Niigata Station - Aoyama - Niigata Kotsu Western Sales Office		46–50 minutes

There are 16 bus stops (see list below) between Niigata Station and Aoyama (the stop at Ishizue-cho is only used for buses operating toward Niigata Station), and services operate every 3–10 minutes during the am & pm peaks and every 10 minutes at other times. Off-peak travel time is 29 minutes.

Rapid services, shown in printed timetables as B10快 (快 translates to rapid), also operate. Rapid services stop at 7 stops and run sporadically on weekdays between approximately 06:30 and 20:00 and on weekends/holidays between 07:30 and 20:00. Off-peak travel time is 26 minutes.

Reports from travellers are that the off-peak travel time is excessive, and as a result buses travel very slowly (20–40 km/h) as well as waiting at numerous bus stops in order to not depart before the scheduled time.

== BRT (Bus Rapid Transit) branding ==
The term bus rapid transit (BRT) is used to define high-standard bus services with features such as: exclusive right of way or bus-only lanes to minimise journey times and provide predictable travel times, traffic signal priority, high capacity & frequent services, platform-level boarding and off-board ticketing. The term is used to differentiate such services from a standard bus service.

Apart from introducing four articulated buses (only a portion of the number needed to fully operate the route) and installation/upgrading bus shelters and waiting rooms, very little has been done to improve the status of the Niigata BRT from a standard bus service to a level which would satisfy even the broadest definition of bus rapid transit - especially the lack of any bus lanes or other traffic priority measures.

=== Brand discontinuation ===
On December 22, 2023, Niigata City and Niigata Kotsu signed a new agreement to replace the BRT (Bus Rapid Transit) operation business agreement which was expiring. The new agreement commences on December 22, 2023 and will last for approximately six years until the end of March 2030. The current Bandai-bashi Line will continue, but the BRT branding will be abolished. The four articulated buses that Niigata City has loaned to Niigata Kotsu will continue to operate, and the city will "replace them as they become worn out".

The agreement also includes new bus route B12 on the Bandai-bashi Line that will run north-south through JR Niigata Station using the new north-south underpass which is part of the new Niigata Station Bus Terminal that opened on March 31, 2024. Route B12 commences at City Hall and services all Bandai-bashi Line stops to Niigata Station with most buses continuing south on S6 Nagata Line as route S61 to Aeon Mall Niigata Kameda-Inter and Niigata Kotsu's Southern Sales Office.

Explaining why the BRT branding was being removed from the Niigata BRT, the Urban Transportation Policy Division of Niigata City stated "in our city, we call systems with articulated buses and dedicated running paths BRT", and "many issues have been identified with the dedicated running paths in past social experiments" in explaining why no bus lanes had been installed as there had been many complaints from car drivers and other road users.

On March 21, 2024 Niigata City began replacing "BRT" signs at bus stops with new "BUS" signs. The work was scheduled to be completed by March 25, 2024.

== Vehicles ==
Four Scania K360UA articulated buses with 'Optimus' bodywork by Volgren of Australia were purchased by Niigata City to operate the Niigata BRT. They feature a striking red livery with black & grey stripes below the windows and signage for BRT and Niigata City Bus Rapid Transit. There was a tentative order for 3 more of these buses, but the order did not eventuate.

The Scania articulated buses mostly operate the Rapid services, but they can also operate the local (all stops) service. All other services (rapid and local) are operated by standard Niigata Kotsu Hino and Mitsubishi/Fuso buses with only a small red and white BRT sign placed on the front of the bus under the windscreen.

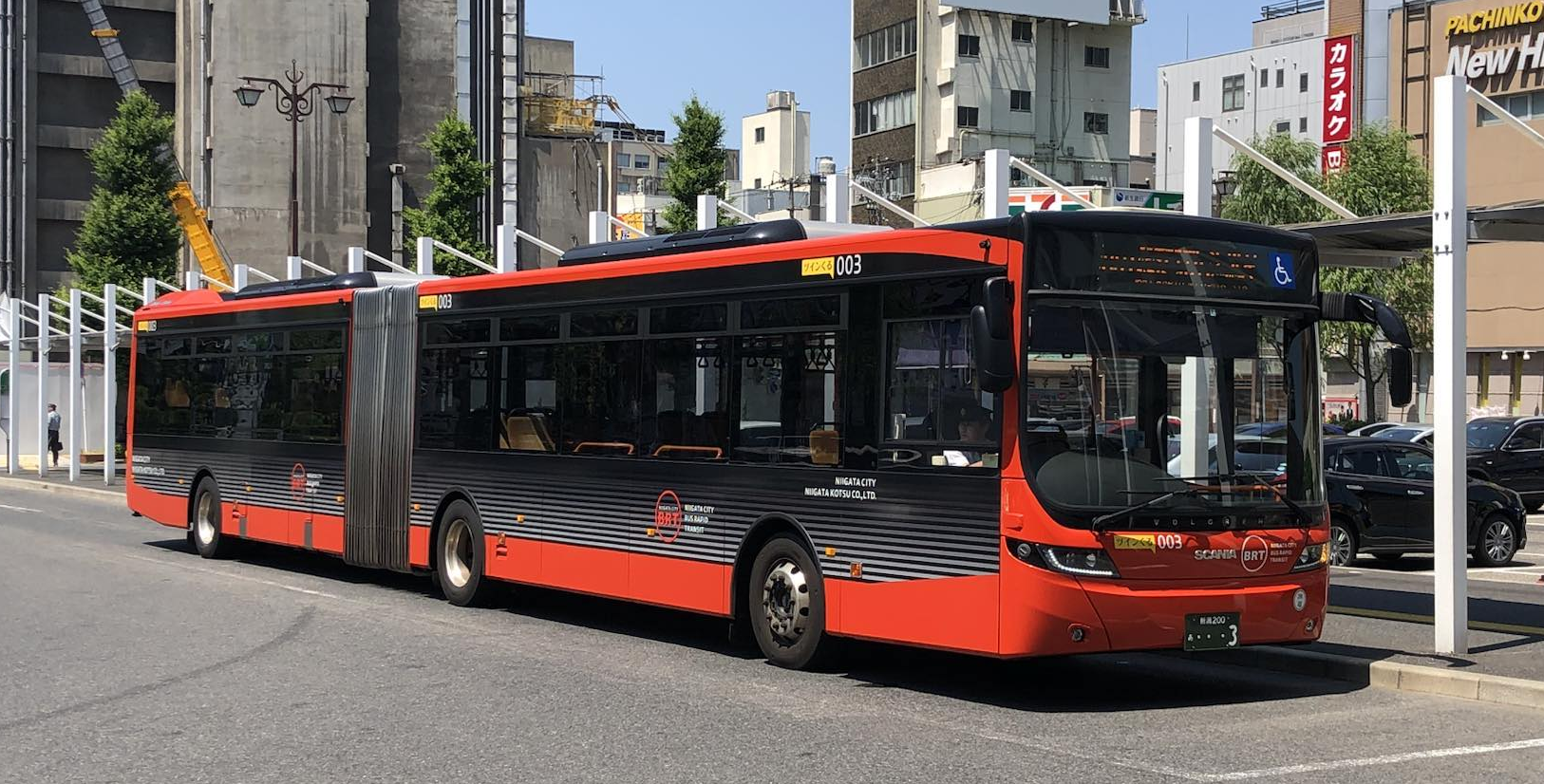
003 Scania K360UA Volgren Optimus in BRT livery

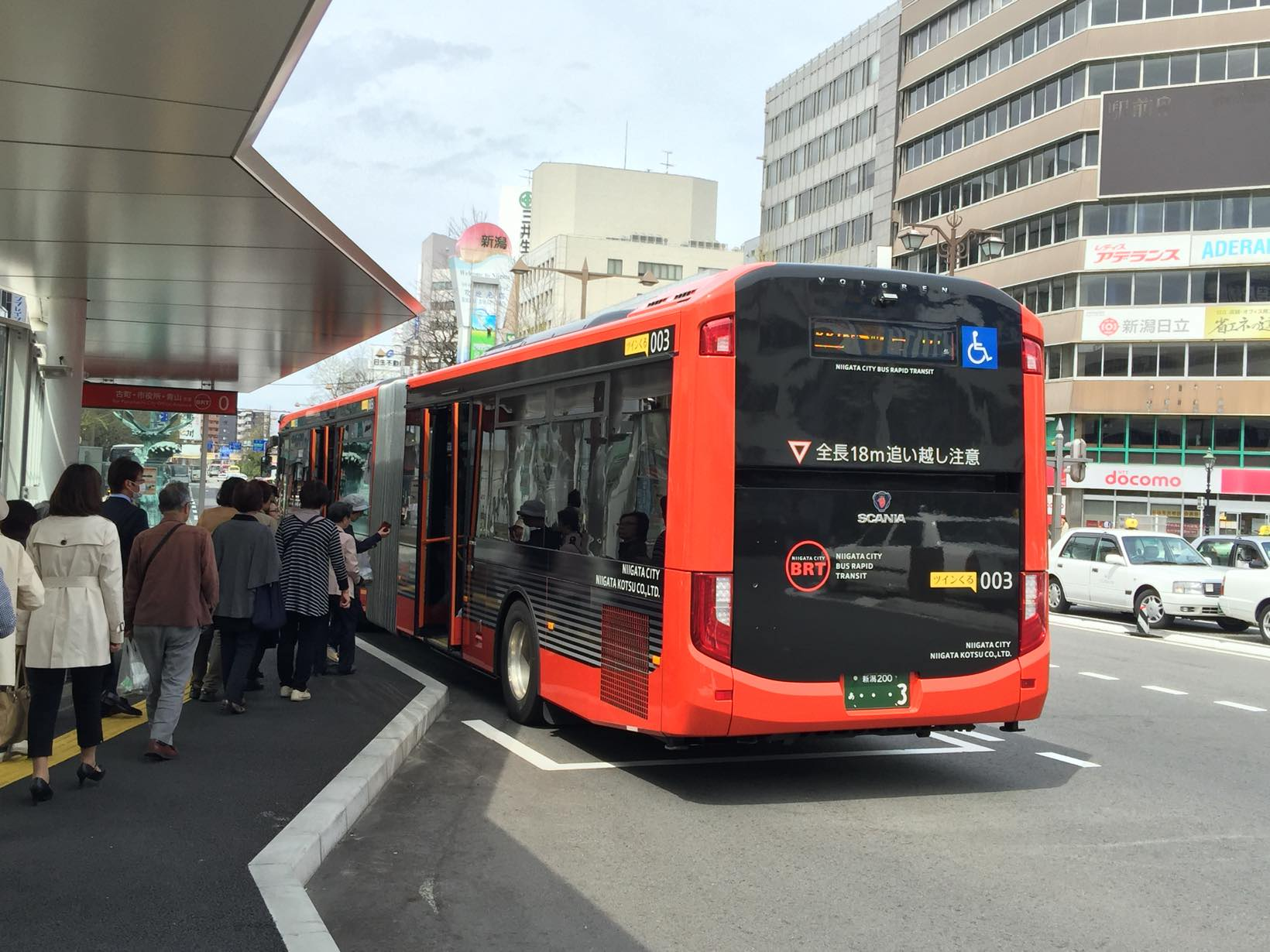
003 Scania K360UA Volgren Optimus in BRT livery

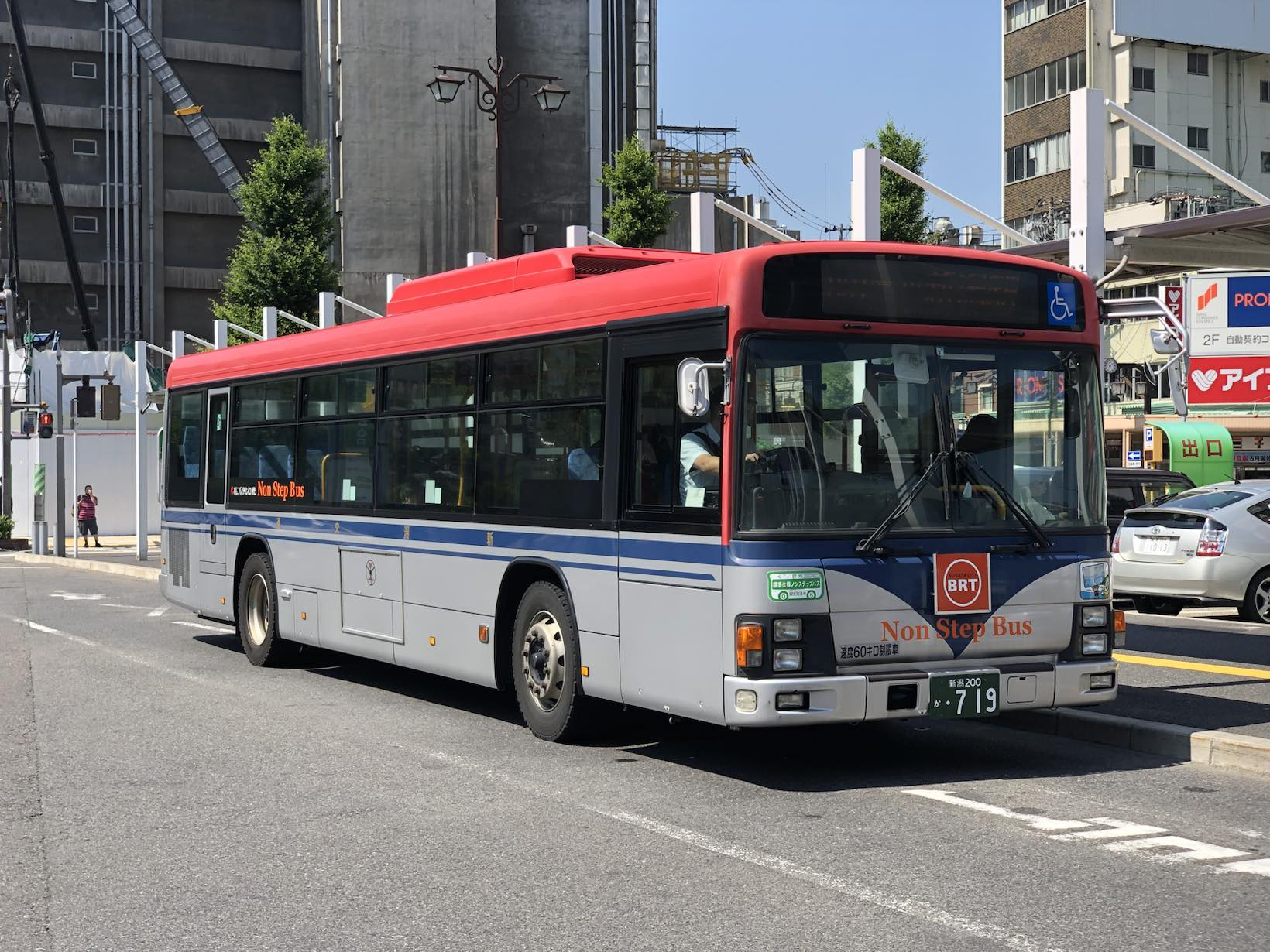
719 Isuzu Erga in standard Niigata Kotsu livery

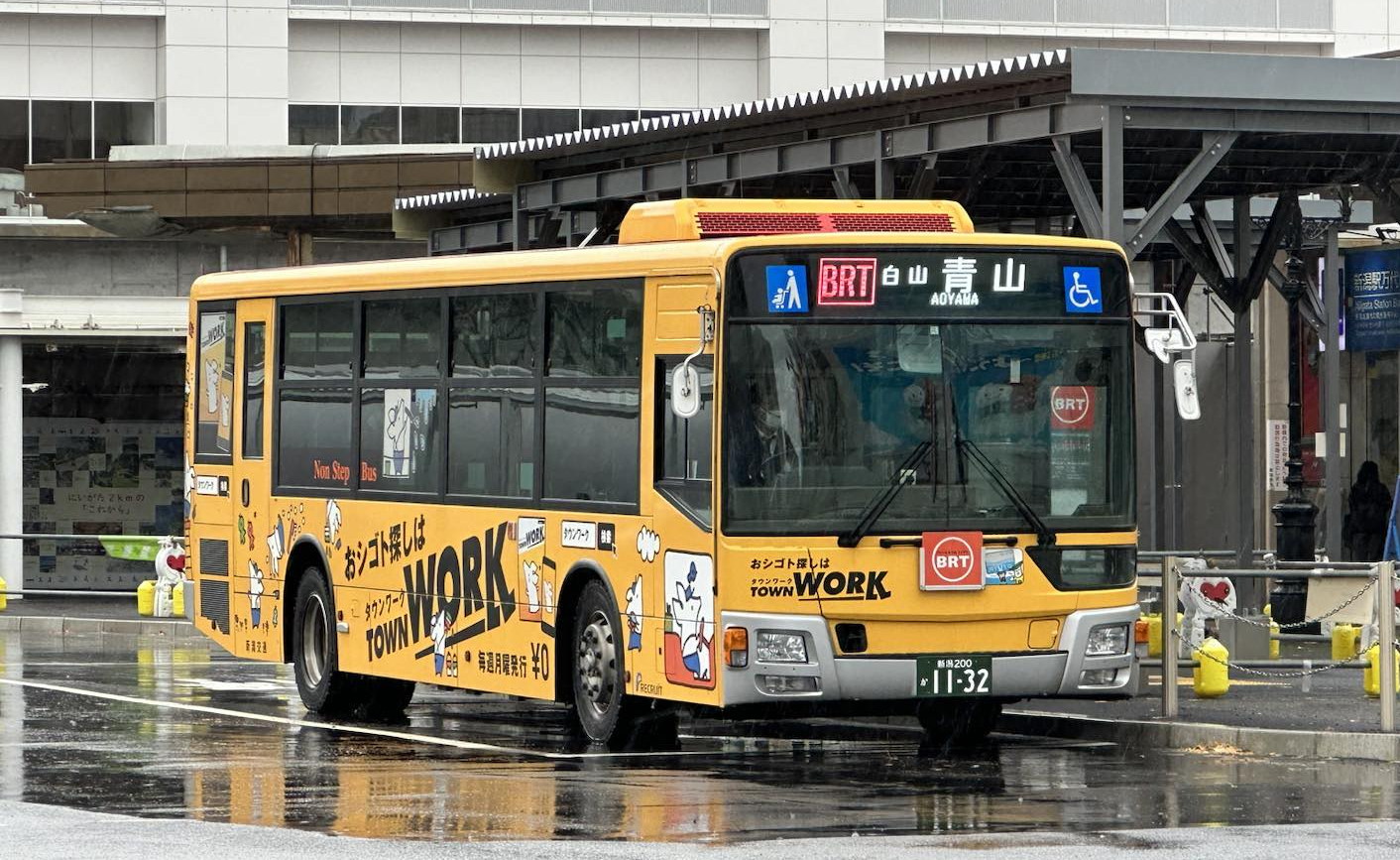
1132 Mitsubishi Fuso Aero Star in all-over advertising wrap.

== List of stops ==
As of April 2018, the following stops are available.

- ● Stops at this stop
- | Does not stop at this stop

No.	Name	Japanese	Rapid	Surrounding area	Coordinates (for Aoyama)
01	Niigata-eki-mae [Niigata Station]	新潟駅前	●	Niigata Station	37°54′47.4″N 139°3′39.3″E
02	Ekimae-dori	駅前通	|		37°54′56.1″N 139°3′34.1″E
03	Bandai City	万代シテイ	●	Bandai shopping district, Niigata Nippo Media Ship	37°55′3.9″N 139°3′24.1″E
04	Ishizue-cho (stop for buses toward Niigata-eki-mae only)	礎町	|		37°55′15.1″N 139°3′2.3″E
05	Honcho	本町	●		37°55′16.9″N 139°2′51.3″E
06	Furumachi	古町	●	Furumachi shopping district, Next21	37°55′19.5″N 139°2′36.1″E
07	Higashinaka-dori	東中通	|		37°55′14.7″N 139°2′24.4″E
08	Shiyakusyo-mae [City Office]	市役所前	●	Niigata City Office, Hakusan Park	37°54′55.4″N 139°2′9.7″E
09	Hakusan-ura	白山浦	|		37°54′51.3″N 139°1′57.5″E
10	Hakusan-eki-mae [Hakusan Sta.]	白山駅前	|	Hakusan Station	37°54′44.6″N 139°1′50″E
11	Koko-dori	高校通	|		37°54′38.1″N 139°1′34.3″E
12	Miyamae-dori	宮前通	|		37°54′32.4″N 139°1′24.1″E
13	Daiichi-Koko-mae [Niigata Daiichi High School]	第一高校前	●	Sekiya Station	37°54′18.9″N 139°1′6.9″E
14	Higashi-sekiya	東関屋	|		37°54′8.8″N 139°0′55.1″E
15	Sekiyaokawa-mae	関屋大川前	|		37°54′2.6″N 139°0′50.4″E
16	Aoyama	青山	●	Aeon Shopping Center, Aoyama Station	37°53′48.3″N 139°0′20.6″E

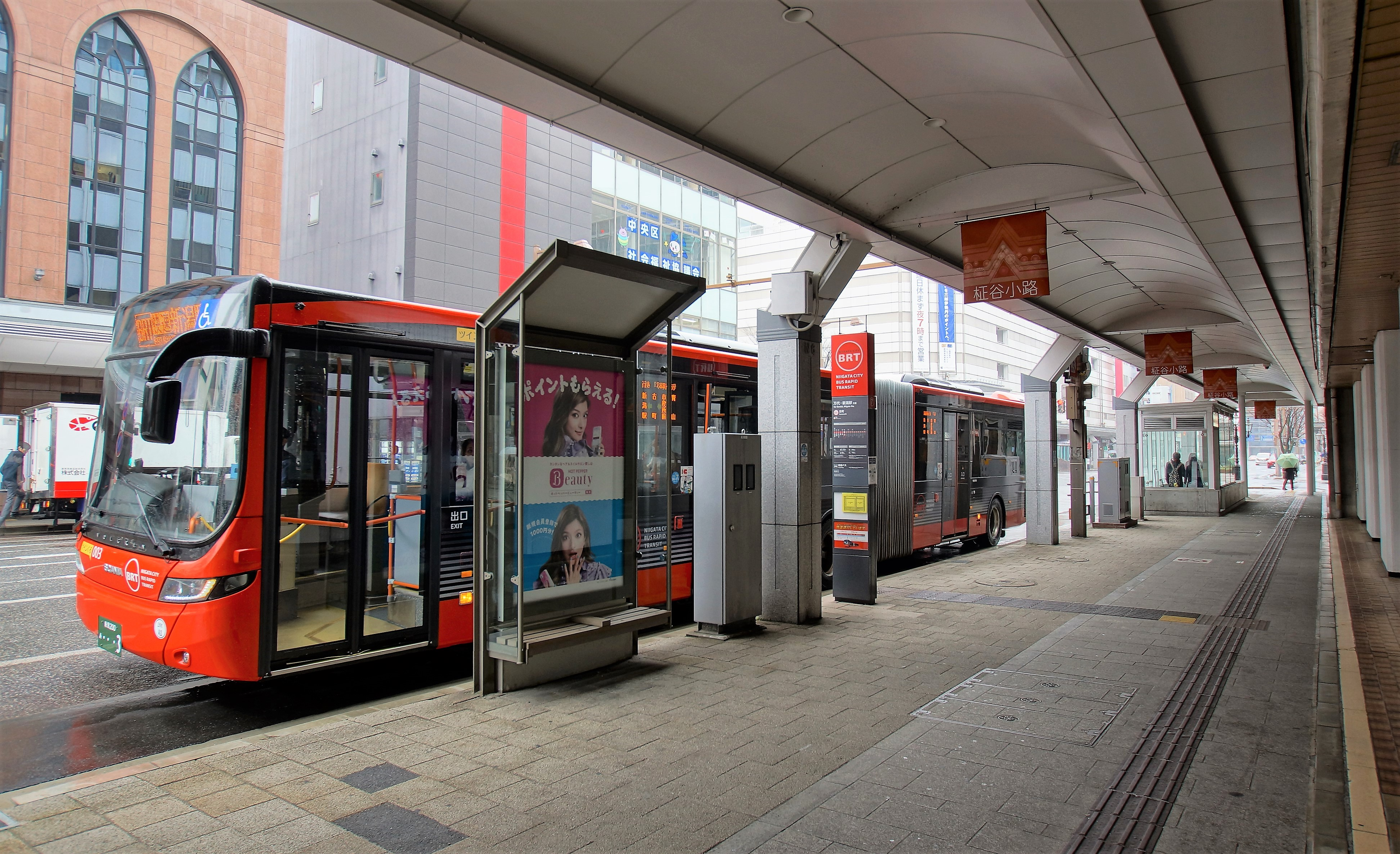
Articulated bus at Furumachi, March 2017

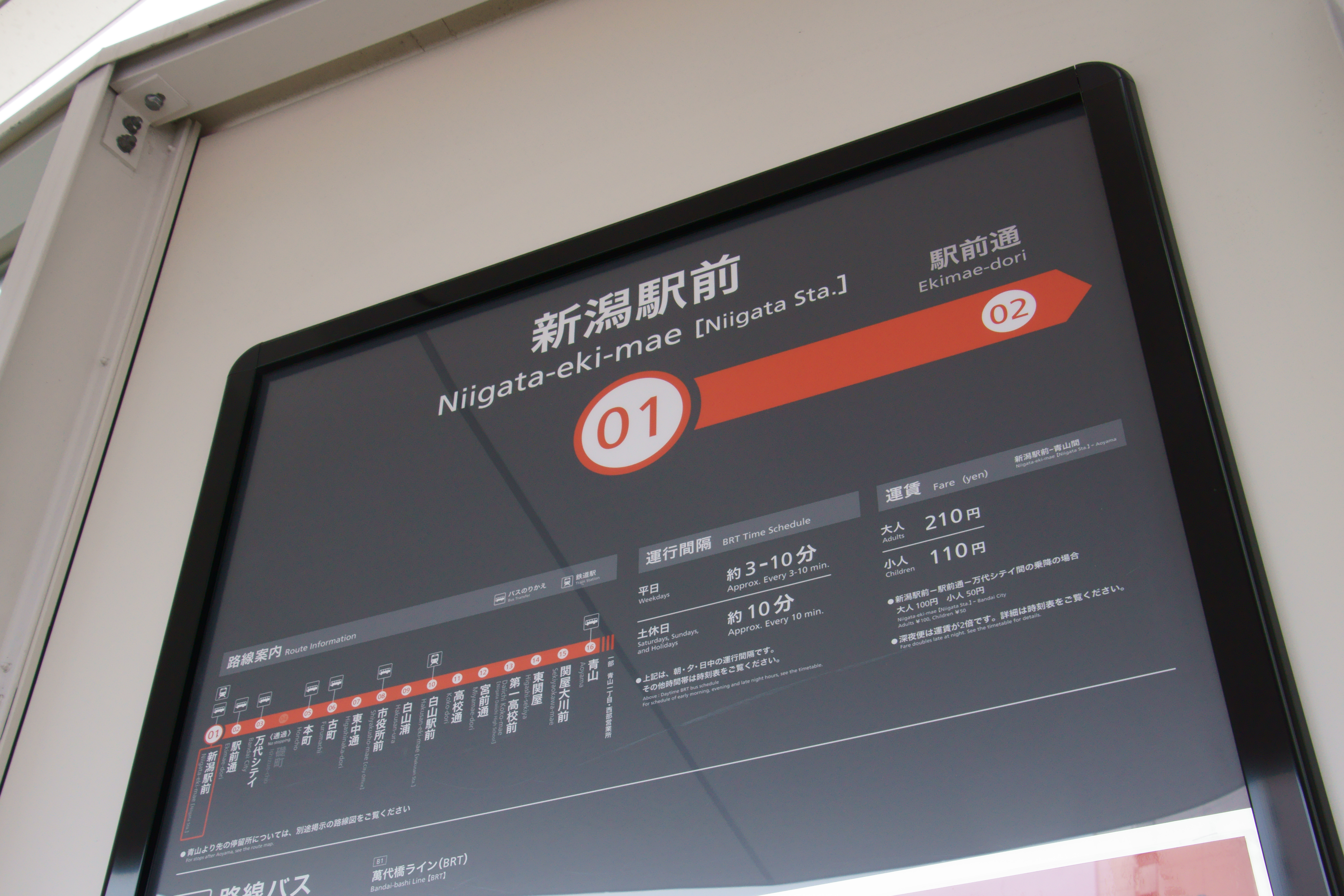
Niigata-eki-mae
