= Bandai City =

Commercial district in Niigata City, Japan

Coordinates: 37°54′58.7″N 139°3′20.6″E

Bandai City (万代シテイ) is a commercial district in Chūō-ku, Niigata City. It is located north-west of Niigata Station, and faces the Shinano River.

It is a popular shopping area of Niigata City, with commercial building complexes and department stores. It also has movie theaters and a theater of idol girl group, NGT48.

== Main Establishments ==
Most of the building complexes are connected by footbridges.

=== Bandai 1 ===
- Bandai City Bus Center
  - Rainbow Tower
- LoveLa Bandai
- LoveLa 2
  - NGT48 theater
- Bandai Silver Hotel
  - Niigata ALTA

=== Bandai 3 ===
- Niigata Nippo Media Ship

=== Yachiyo 1,2 ===
- Niigata Isetan
- Bandai City Billboard Place
- Bandai City Billboard Place 2
  - Niigata Manga Animation Museum
- Across Niigata
Bandai City Bus Center

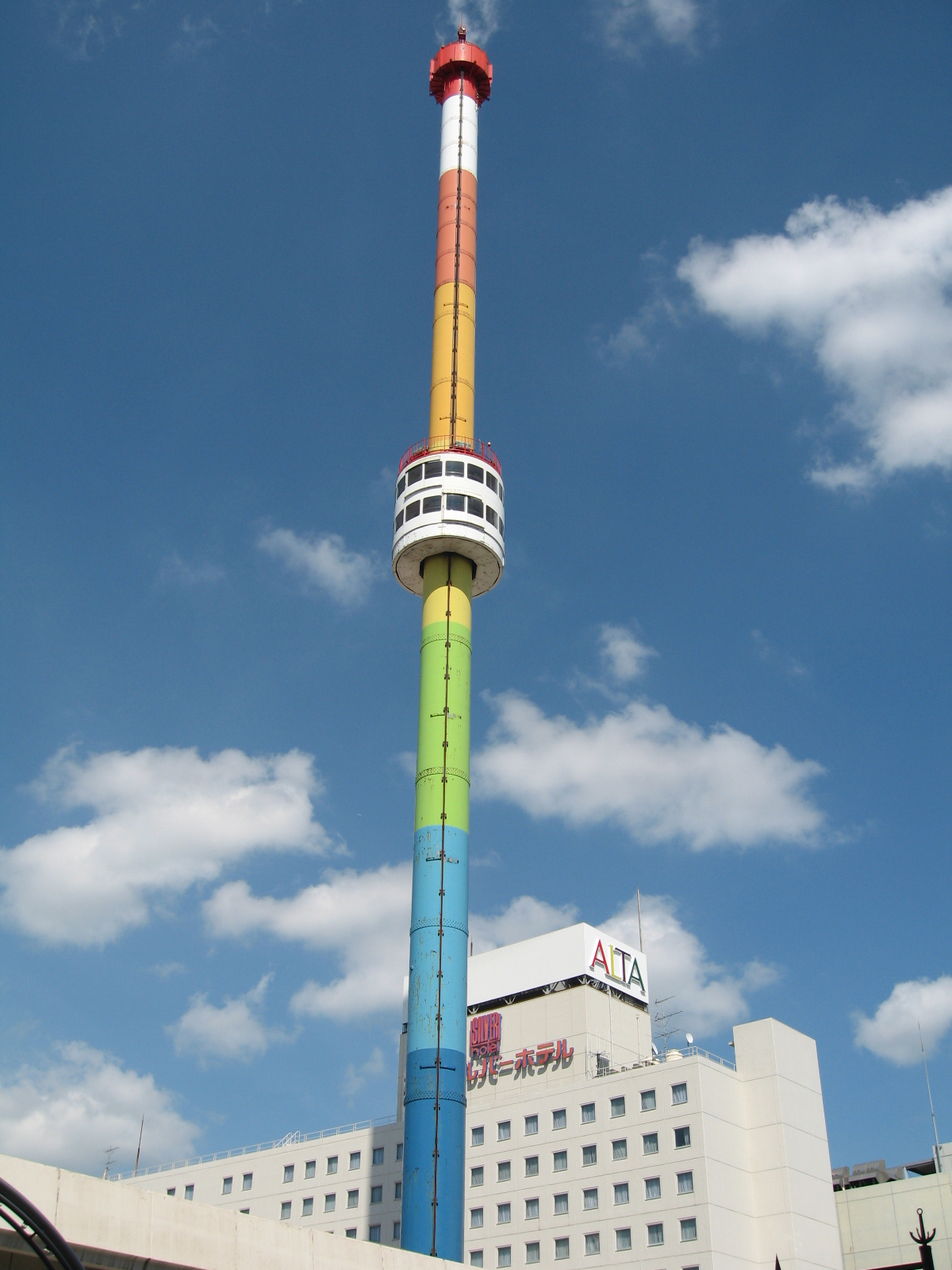
Rainbow Tower, the symbol of Bandai City

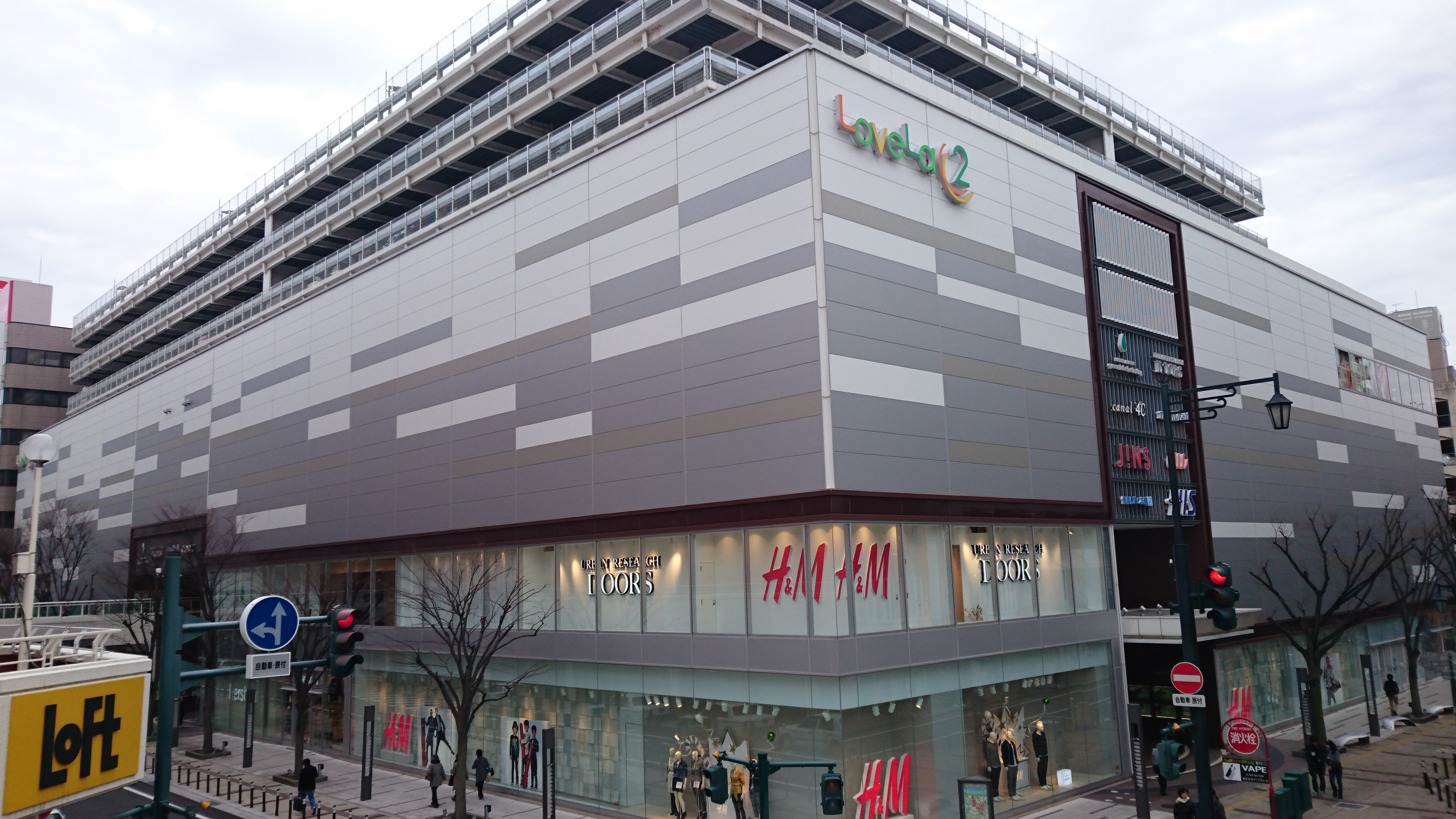
LoveLa2

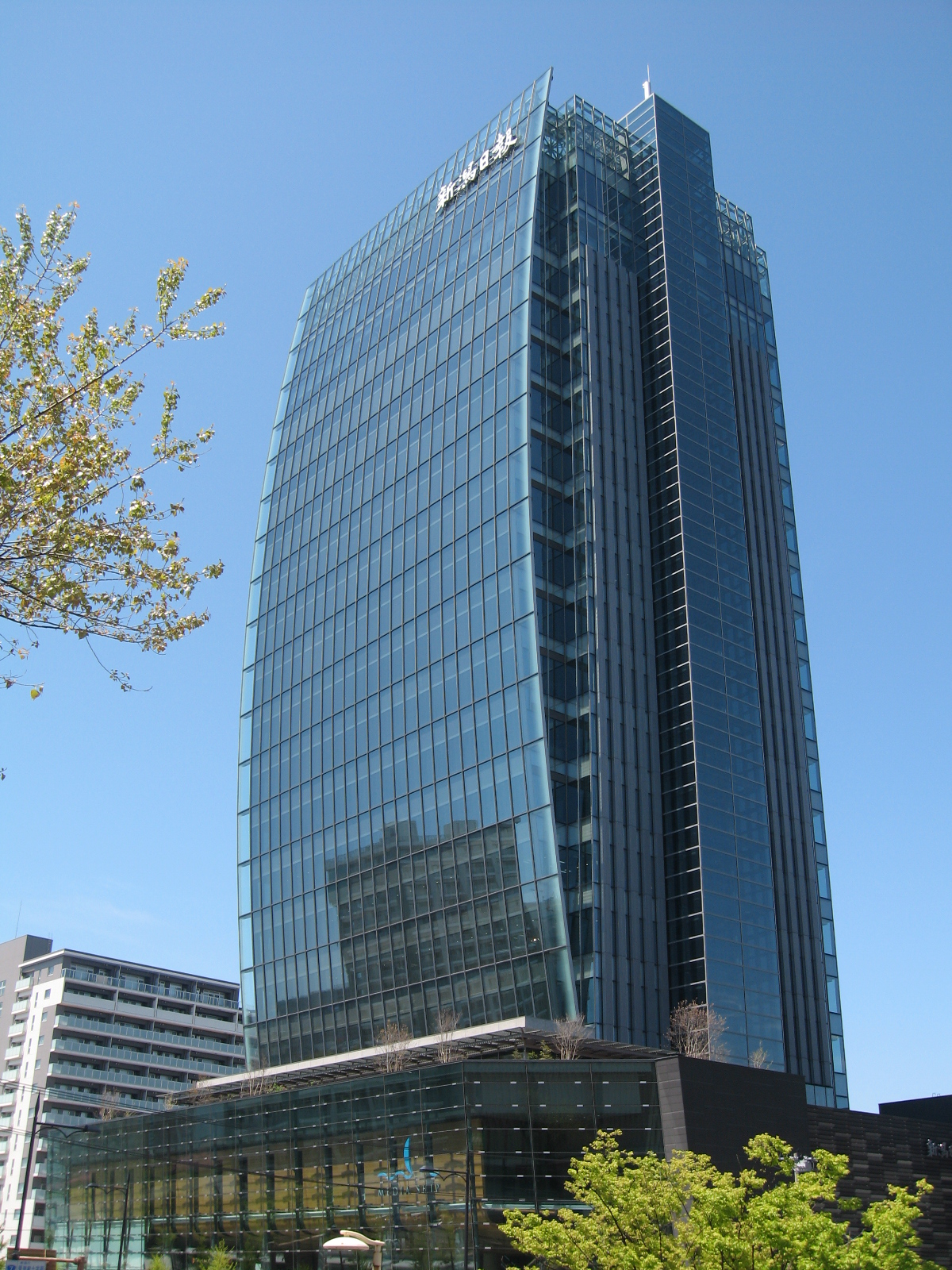
Media Ship

== Transportation ==
Most of the Niigata Kotsu buses depart from Bandai City Bus Center or nearby bus stop "Bandai City".

== See also ==
- Furumachi (Niigata)
- Chūō-ku, Niigata
