= Niigata Kotsu =

Public transportation company

Niigata Kotsu Co., Ltd.
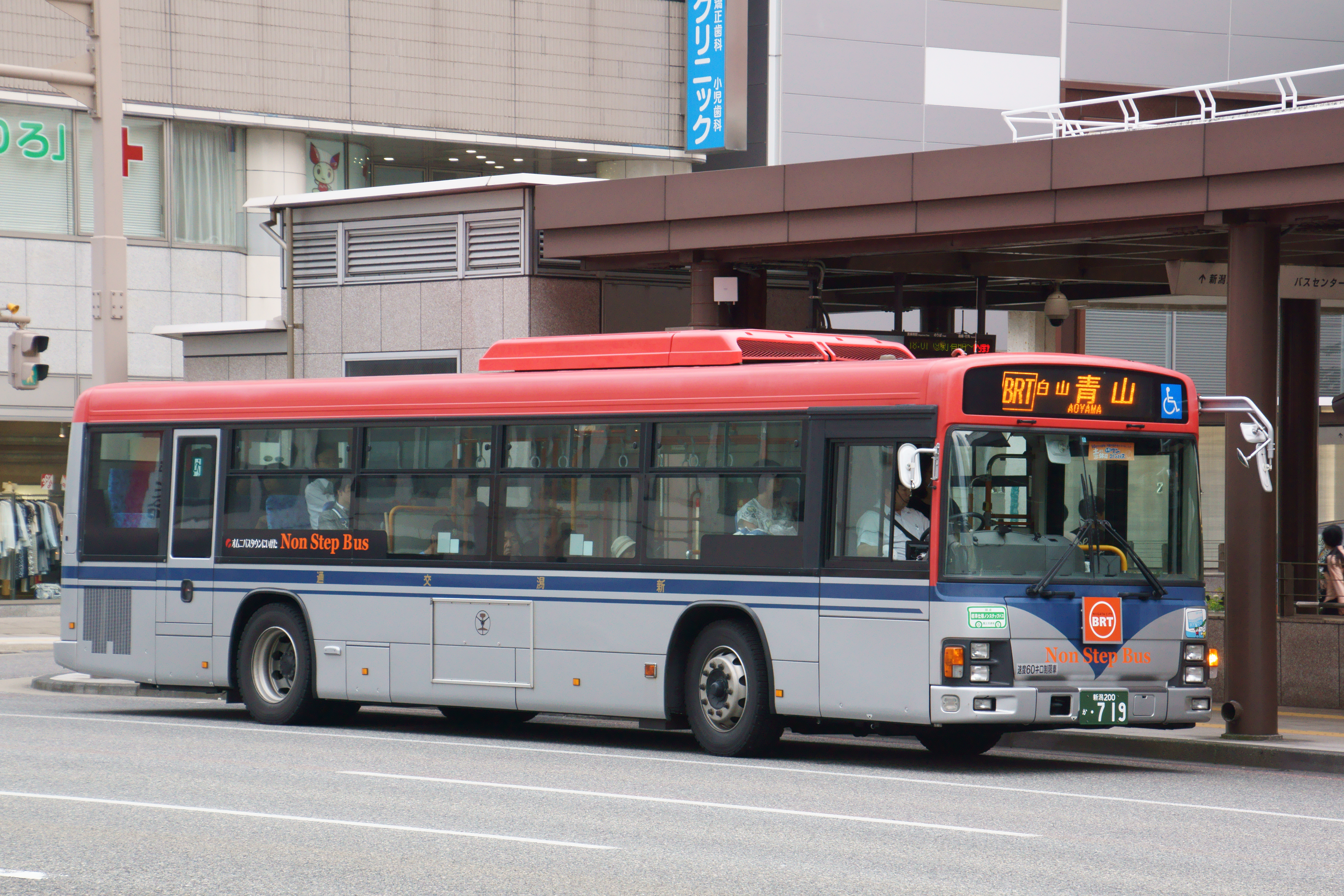
- Native name: 新潟交通株式会社
- Type: Corporation
- Industry: Public transportation (Bus)
- Founded: December 1943
- Headquarters: Niigata, Niigata, Japan
- Area served: Niigata Prefecture
- Website: www.niigata-kotsu.co.jp

Niigata Kotsu Co., Ltd. (新潟交通株式会社, Niigata-kōtsū Kabushiki-gaisha) is a public transportation company which operates local and long-distance buses in Niigata Prefecture, Japan.

== Bus lines ==
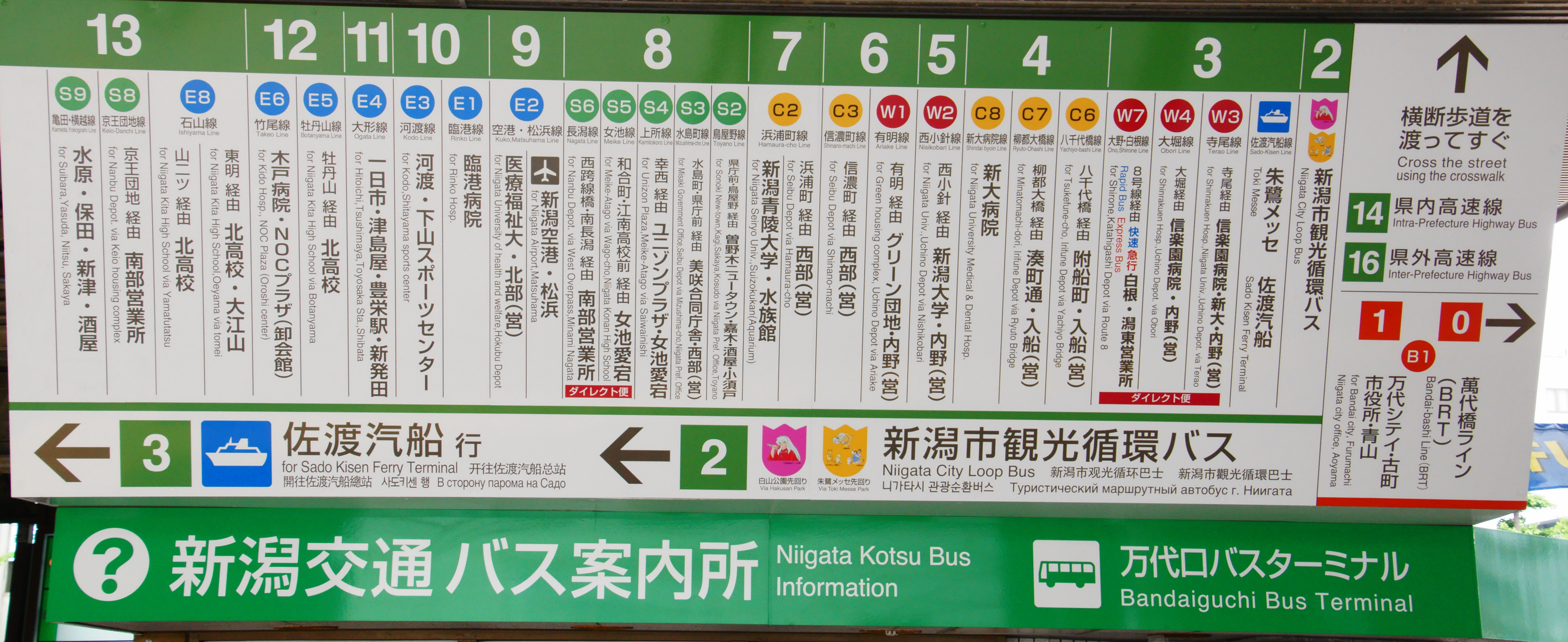
A sign of Bandaiguchi Bus Terminal, June 2016

As of April 2018, the following bus lines are in service.

=== Regular buses ===
- Timetables - Niigata Kotsu (2018.3)

==== BRT ====
BRT
Line No. (Route No.)	Line Name	Japanese	Route
BRT (B10, B12, B13)	Bandai-bashi Line	萬代橋ライン	Niigata Sta. - Furumachi - City Office - Hakusan Sta. - Aoyama

==== Central Niigata ====
- RouteMap (Central Niigata) - Niigata Kotsu (2018.3)

Central Niigata
Line No. (Route No.)	Line Name	Japanese	Route
C1 (C10, C12, C13)	Kencho Line	県庁線	City Office - Pref. Office - <via Pref. Route 51> - Niigata Sta. (South)
C2 (C20, C21, C22)	Hamaura-cho Line	浜浦町線	Niigata Sta. - Furumachi - Seiryo Univ. - Aquarium; Niigata Sta. - Furumachi - Hamaura-cho - Aoyama - Seibu Depot
C3 (C30, C31, C32)	Shinano-machi Line	信濃町線	Niigata Sta. - Furumachi - <via Nishi-Odori> - Aoyama - Seibu Depot
C4 (C40)	Higashibori-dori Line	東堀通線	City office - Higashibori-dori (Furumachi) - Minatopia - Irifune
C5 (C50, C51)	Nishibori-dori Line	西堀通線	City office - Nishibori-dori (Furumachi) - Tsukefune-cho - Irifune
C6 (C60)	Yachiyo-bashi Line	八千代橋線	Niigata Sta. - Nishibori-dori (Furumachi) - Tsukefune-cho - Irifune
C7 (C70)	Ryuto-Ohashi Line	柳都大橋線	Niigata Sta. - <via Ryuto Bridge> - Minatomachi - Irifune
C8 (C80)	Shindai byoin Line	新大病院線	Niigata Sta. - Niigata Univ. Medical & Dental Hosp.
みなと	Minato Loop Bus	みなと循環線	Pia Bandai - Nuttari - <via Bandai Bridge> - Furumachi - <via Ryuto Bridge> - Nuttari - Media Ship
	Sado Kisen Line	佐渡汽船線	Niigata Sta. - Toki Messe - Sado Kisen Ferry Terminal

==== South Niigata ====
- RouteMap (South Niigata) - Niigata Kotsu (2018.3)

South Niigata
Line No. (Route No.)	Line Name	Japanese	Route
S1 (S10)	Shimin byoin Line	市民病院線	Niigata Univ. Medical & Dental Hosp. - Pref. Office - <via Pref. Route 16> - Niigata City General Hosp.
S2 (S20 - S23)	Toyano Line	鳥屋野線	Niigata Sta. - Furumachi - Pref. Office - <via Pref. Route 1> - Sonoki New-town or Kagi; Niigata Sta. - Furumachi - Pref. Office - <via Pref. Route 1> - Sakaya or Kosudo
S3 (S30, S31)	Mizushima-cho Line	水島町線	Niigata Sta. - <via Pref. Route 1> - Pref. office - Misaki Government Office
S4 (S40, S41)	Kamitokoro Line	上所線	Niigata Sta. - Unizon Plaza - Meike-Atago
S5 (S50 - S52)	Meike Line	女池線	Niigata Sta. (South) - Niigata Konan HS - Meike-Atago; City office - Niigata Konan HS - Meike-Atago
S6 (S60 - S64)	Nagata Line	長潟線	Niigata Sta. (South) - AEON Mall Niigata Minami - Nanbu Depot
S7 (S70 - S72)	Sports Koen Line	スポーツ公園	Niigata Sta. (South) - Big Swan Stadium - Niigata City General Hosp. - Sonoki New-town
S8 (S80)	Keio-Danchi Line	京王団地線	Bandai City - Niigata Sta. - Keio-Danchi - Nanbu Depot
S9 (S90 - S97)	Kameda, Yokogoshi Line	亀田・横越線	Bandai City - Niigata Sta. - <via Pref. Route 5> - Kameda Sta. - Yokogoshi - Suibara; Bandai City - Niigata Sta. - <via Pref. Route 5> - Kameda Sta. - Yokogoshi - Somi - Niitsu; Bandai City - Niigata Sta. - <via Pref. Route 5> - Kameda Sta. - Nihongi - Niitsu

==== West Niigata ====
- RouteMap (West Niigata) - Niigata Kotsu (2018.3)

West Niigata
Line No. (Route No.)	Line Name	Japanese	Route	Notes
W1 (W10 - W15)	Ariake Line	有明線	Niigata Sta. - Furumachi - Ariake - Green housing complex - Uchino Depot	
W2 (W20 - W25)	Nishikobari Line	西小針線	Niigata Sta. - Furumachi - <via Nishi-Odori> - Niigata Univ. or Uchino Depot	
W3 (W30 - W33)	Terao Line	寺尾線	Aoyama - <via Pref. Route 16> - Shinrakuen Hosp., Niigata Univ. or Uchino Depot	
W4 (W40 - W46)	Kobari Line	大堀線	Aoyama - Obori - Shinrakuen Hosp. or Uchino Depot	
W5 (W50, W51)	Koshin Line	小新線	Aoyama - Koshin	
W6 (W60)	Chitose-Ohashi Line	千歳大橋線	Aoyama - Pref. office - Misaki government office	Weekdays only
W7 (W70 - W74)	Ono, Shirone Line	大野・白根線	Aoyama - Furusato Village - <via National Route 8> - Shirone - Katahigashi; Niigata Sta. - Furusato Village - <via National Route 8> - Shirone - Katahigashi	
W8 (W80, W81)	Ajikata Line	味方線	Aoyama - Furusato Village - <via Pref. Route 325> - Ajikata - Katahigashi	

==== East Niigata ====
- RouteMap (East Niigata) - Niigata Kotsu (2018.3)

East Niigata
Line No. (Route No.)	Line Name	Japanese	Route
E1 (E10 - E12)	Rinko Line	臨港線	Niigata Sta. - Nuttari - Rinko Hosp.
E2 (E20 - E27)	Kuko, Matsuhama Line	空港・松浜線	Niigata Sta. - <via National Route 113> - Niigata Airport; Niigata Sta. - <via National Route 113> - Matsuhama - Niigata Univ. of health and welfare, Niigata Racecourse or Tarodai
E3 (E30, E31)	Kodo Line	河渡線	Niigata Sta. - Kodo
E4 (E40 - E47)	Ogata Line	大形線	Bandai City - Niigata Sta. - <via Pref. Route 3> - Tsushimaya, Hitoichi or Oeyama; Bandai City - Niigata Sta. - <via Pref. Route 3> - Toyosaka Sta., Niigata Racecourse or Shibata
E5 (E50, E51)	Botanyama Line	牡丹山線	Bandai City - Niigata Sta. - Botanyama - Ogata Sta. - Niigata Kita HS
E6 (E60, E61)	Takeo Line	竹尾線	Bandai City - Niigata Sta. - Takeo
E7 (E70)	Hanamizuki Line	はなみずき線	Niigata Sta. (South) - Kido Hosp.
E8 (E80 - E82)	Ishiyama Line	石山線	Bandai City - Niigata Sta. - Tomei - Ogata Sta. - Niigata Kita HS; Niigata Sta. (South) - Bentenbashi - <via Pref. Route 290> - Ogata Sta. - Niigata Kita HS

=== Highway buses ===
==== Niigata Prefecture domestic lines ====
Domestic Highway Buses in Niigata Prefecture. Niigata Kotsu Group operates "N" and "Nk"-marked lines

- Niigata - Nagaoka
- Niigata - Maki
- Niigata - Sanjo, Tsubame
- Niigata - Takada - Naoetsu

==== Inter-prefecture lines ====
Inter-Prefectural Highway Buses in Niigata Prefecture.

- Niigata - Omiya, Tokyo
- Niigata - Nagano
- Niigata - Toyama
- Niigata - Kanazawa
- Niigata - Kyoto, Osaka
- Niigata - Nagoya
- Niigata - Sendai
- Niigata - Kōriyama
- Niigata - Aizuwakamatsu
- Niigata - Yamagata

== Gallery ==
Bandai City Bus Center, the company headquarters

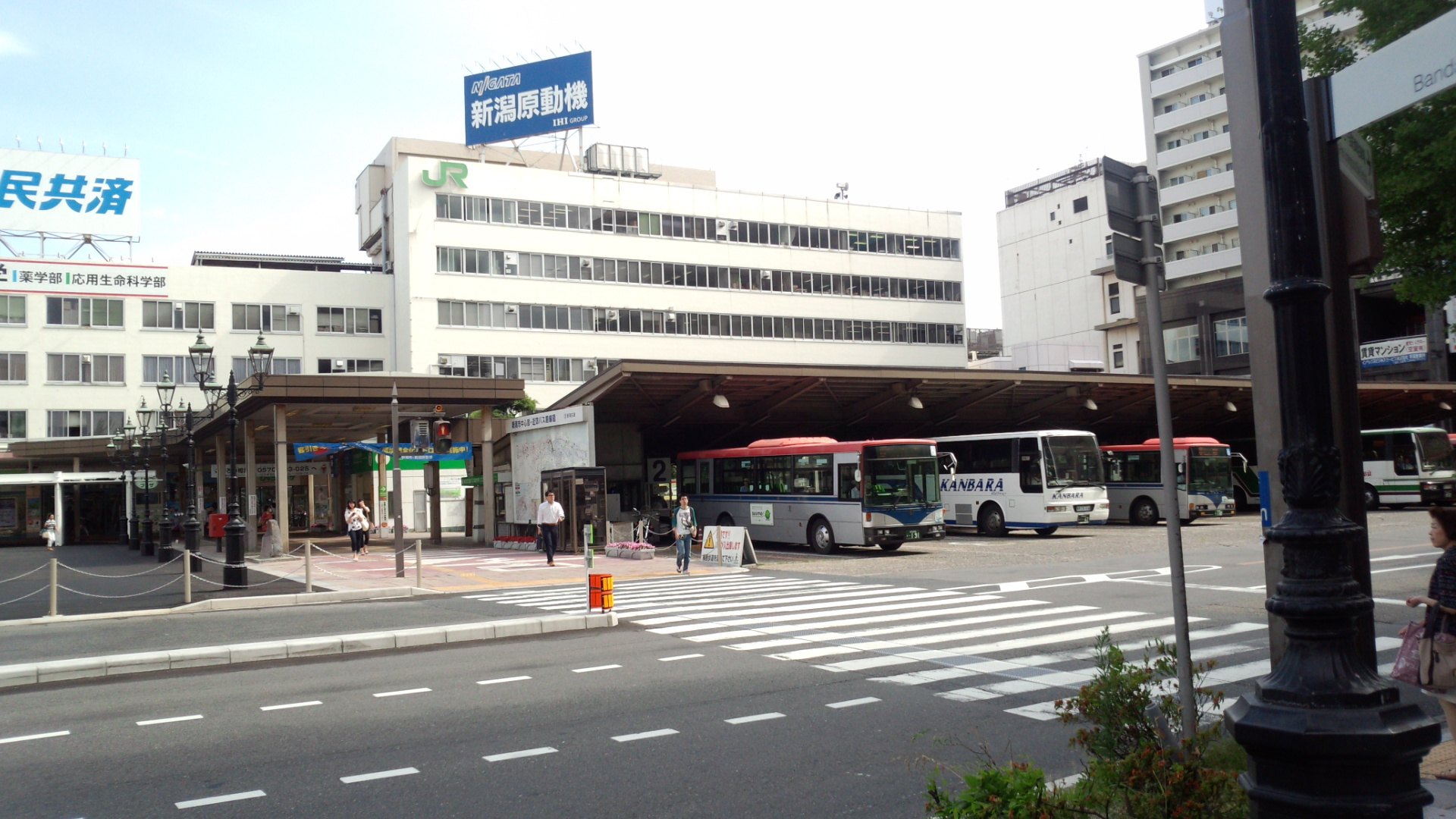
Niigata Station Bandaiguchi Bus Terminal
