= Niigata Nippo Media Ship =

- 新潟日報メディアシップ
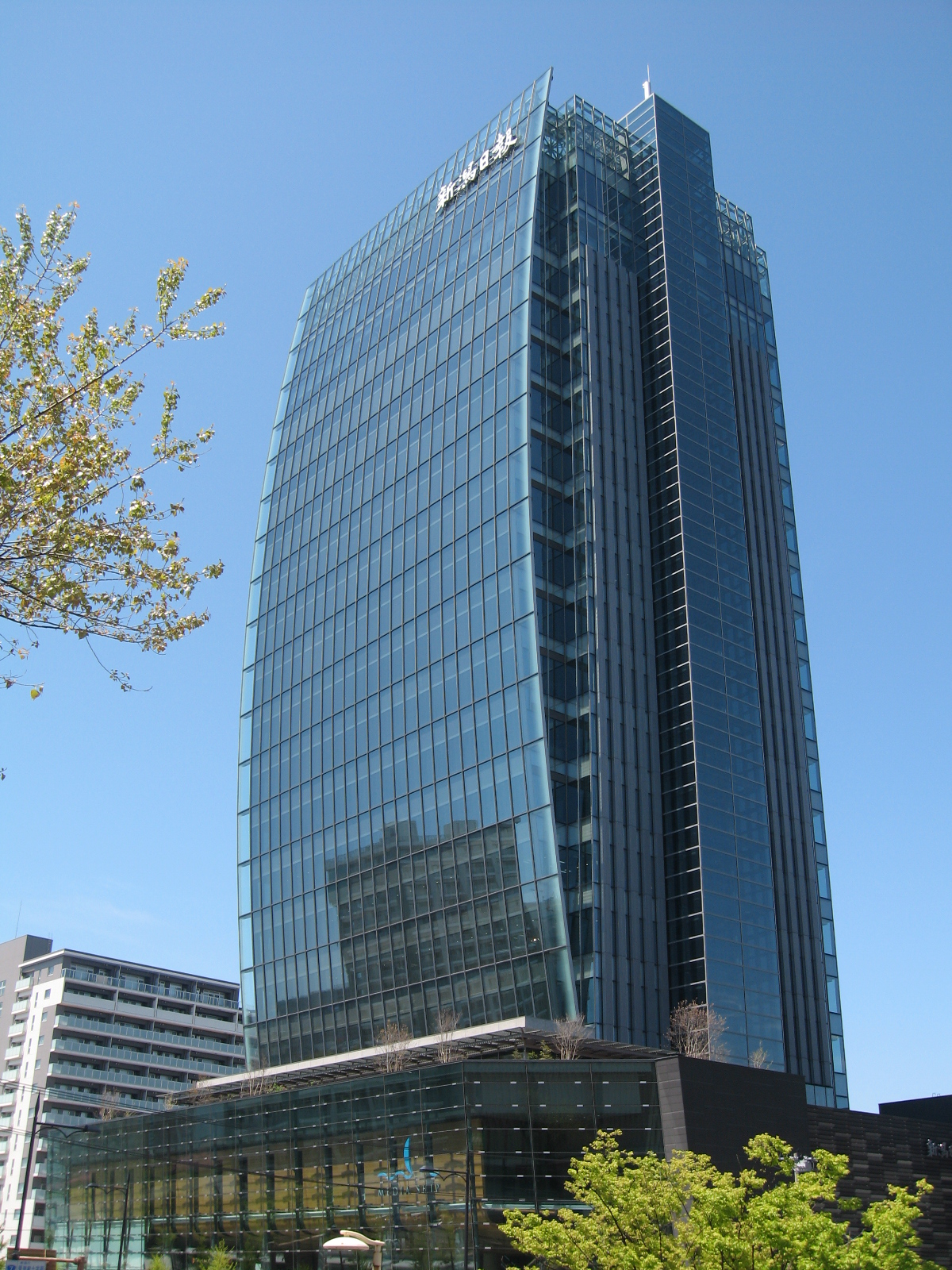
- Niigata Nippo Media Ship
- Interactive map of the Niigata Nippo Media Ship area

General information
- Location: 3-1-1 Bandai, Chūō-ku, Niigata, Niigata Prefecture, Japan
- Coordinates: 37°55′7″N 139°3′22″E
- Construction started: 2011
- Completed: 2013
- Opened: 2013

Height
- Roof: 105 m (344 ft)

Technical details
- Floor count: 20

Website
- Official website (in Japanese)

Niigata Nippo Media Ship (新潟日報メディアシップ) is a skyscraper in Chūō-ku, Niigata, Japan. It is 105 metres (344 ft) tall, and has 20 floors.

On the 20th floor, there is an observatory, offering a 360-degree view of the city, Shinano River, Sea of Japan, and Sado Island.

== Gallery ==
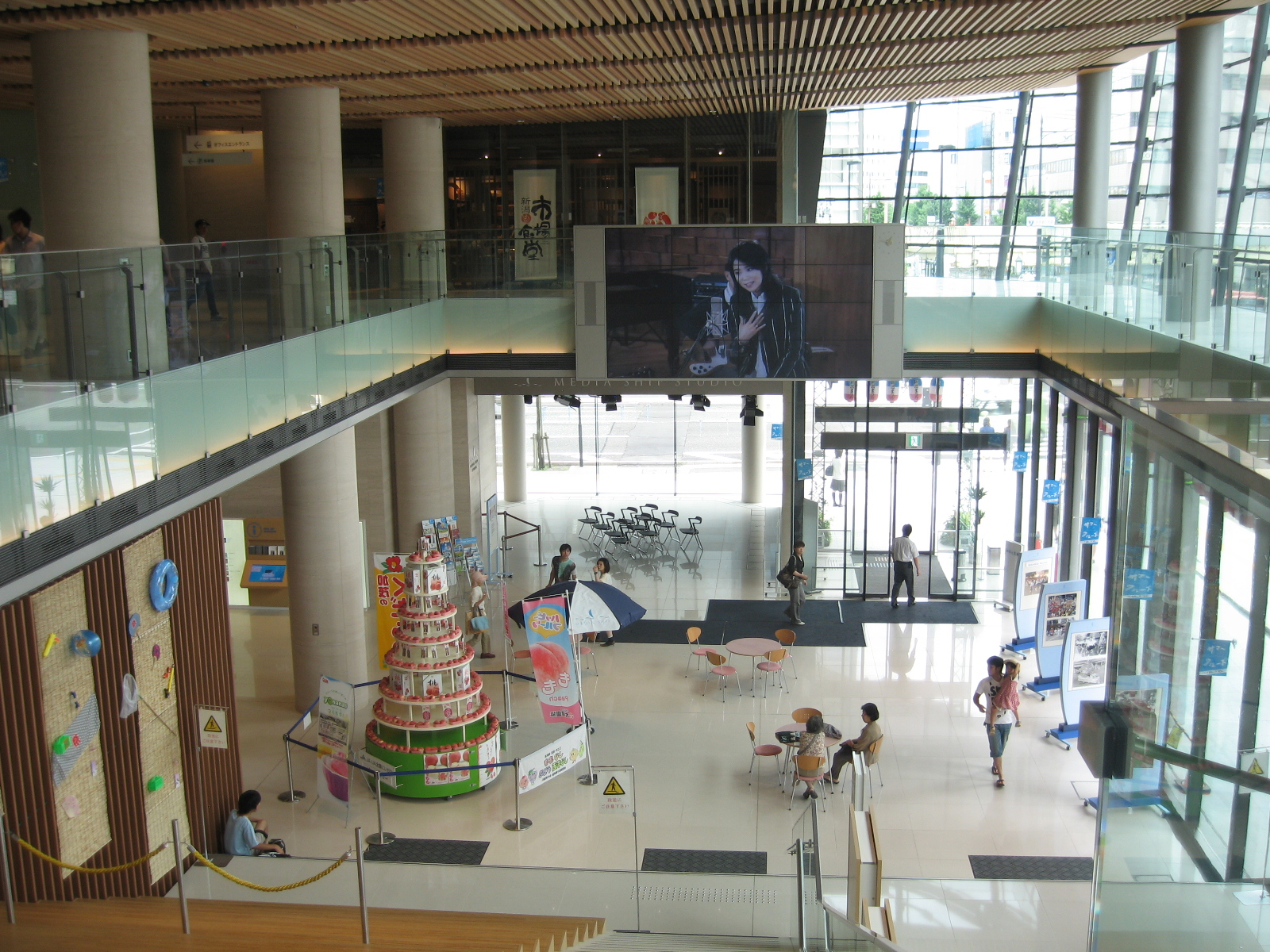
Lobby

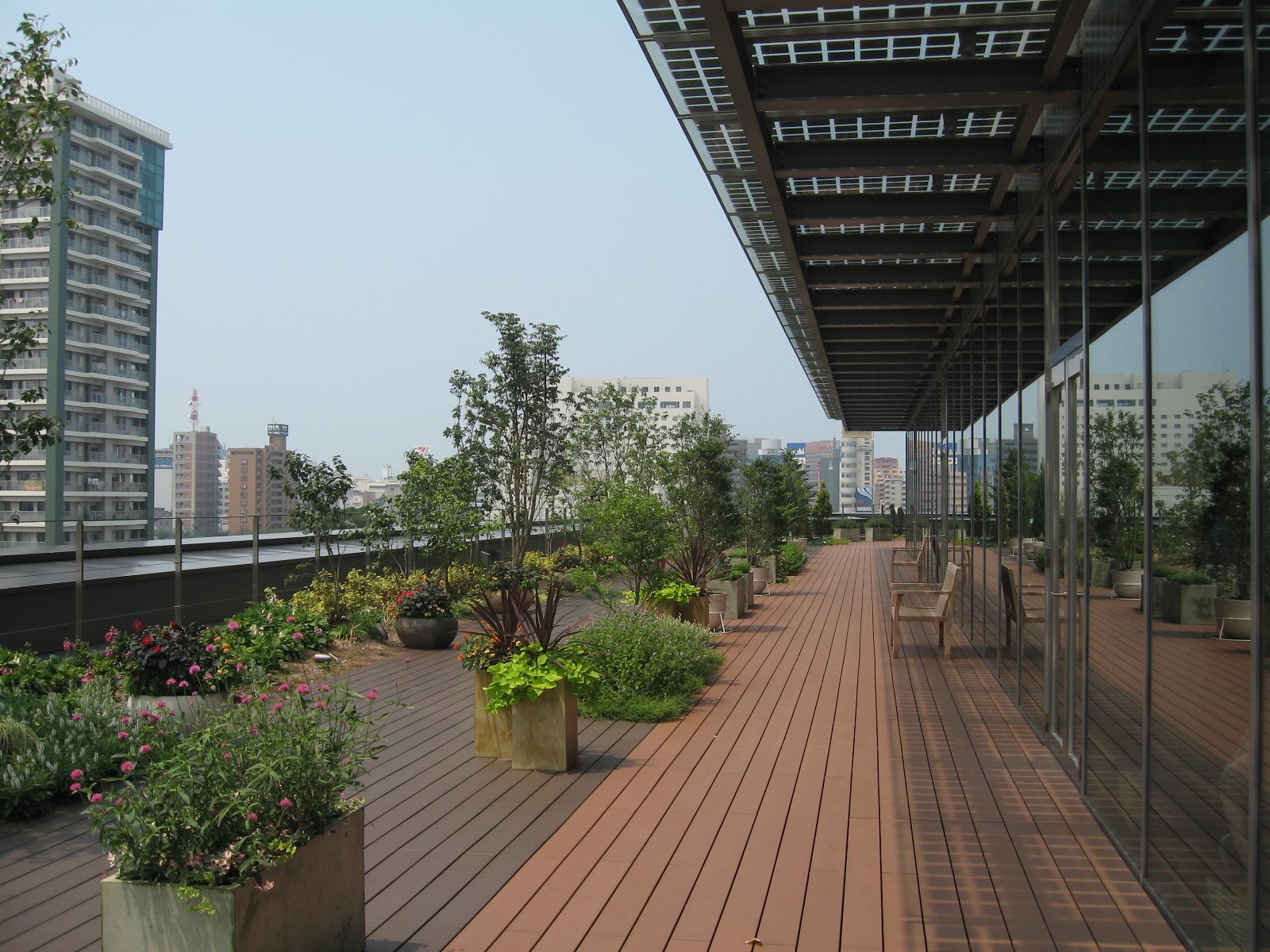
4th floor podium garden

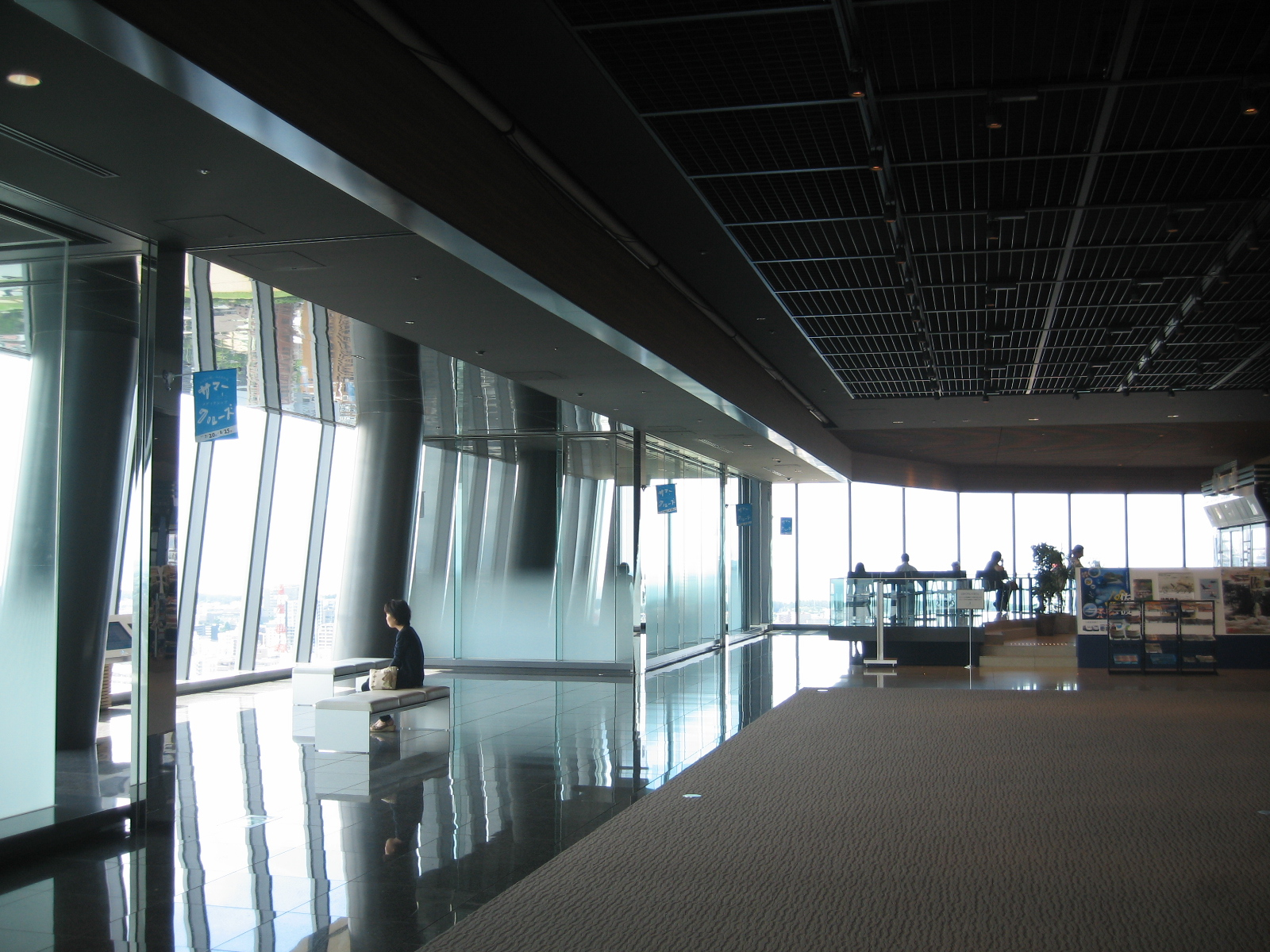
20th floor observatory

== Access ==
It takes about 10 minutes on foot from Niigata Station Bandai Exit.

=== Bus ===
The Bandai City bus stop (Stop No. 03) on the Bandai-bashi Line BRT is located near the building. The Niigata Nippo Media Ship bus stop is also served by the Niigata City Loop Bus.

== See also ==
- Bandai City
- Bandai Bridge
- Toki Messe
- Next21
