= Toki Messe =

Convention center in Niigata, Niigata Prefecture, Japan

- 朱鷺メッセ
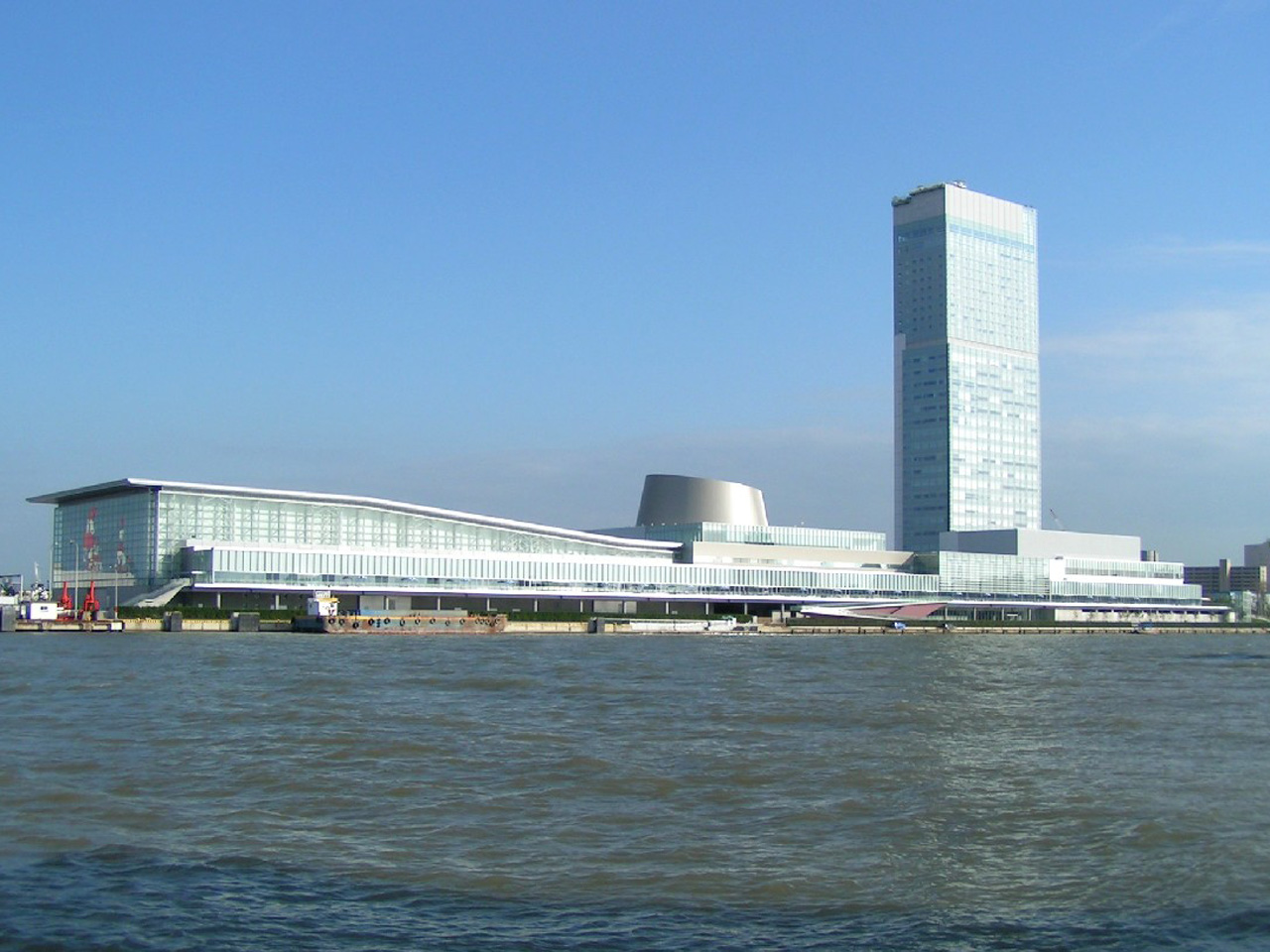
- Toki Messe

- Location within Japan

General information
- Type: multi-purpose international convention center
- Location: Niigata, Niigata, Japan
- Coordinates: 37°55′34″N 139°03′36″E
- Opened: 1 May 2003

Height
- Top floor: 140 metres (459.32 ft)

Technical details
- Floor count: 31

Toki Messe
- Public transit: Exhibition Centre; Convention

Toki Messe (朱鷺メッセ, Toki Messe) is a multi-purpose international convention center in Niigata, Niigata Prefecture, Japan. The center was opened on May 1, 2003, and contains a hotel, restaurants, an art museum, conference rooms, and the offices of several international organizations.

Since 2004, Toki Messe has been the site of home games for the Niigata Albirex Basketball Team.

Toki Messe is the tallest building on the Sea of Japan, and has an observation deck on the 31st floor where one can view the areas in and around Niigata. Depending on the weather, one can also see Sado and Awashima islands.

The complex is named after the toki, the official bird of Niigata Prefecture.

== Access ==
It takes about 20 minutes on foot from Niigata Station Bandai Exit.

=== Transit bus ===
There is a Niigata Kotsu "Sado-Kisen Line" bus stop 'Toki Messe'. Also, Niigata City Loop Bus has a stop 'Toki Messe'. It takes about 15 minutes from Niigata Station Bandai Exit.

== See also ==
- Bandai Bridge
- Niigata Nippo Media Ship
- Next21

== Gallery ==
Observation Deck at Toki Messe

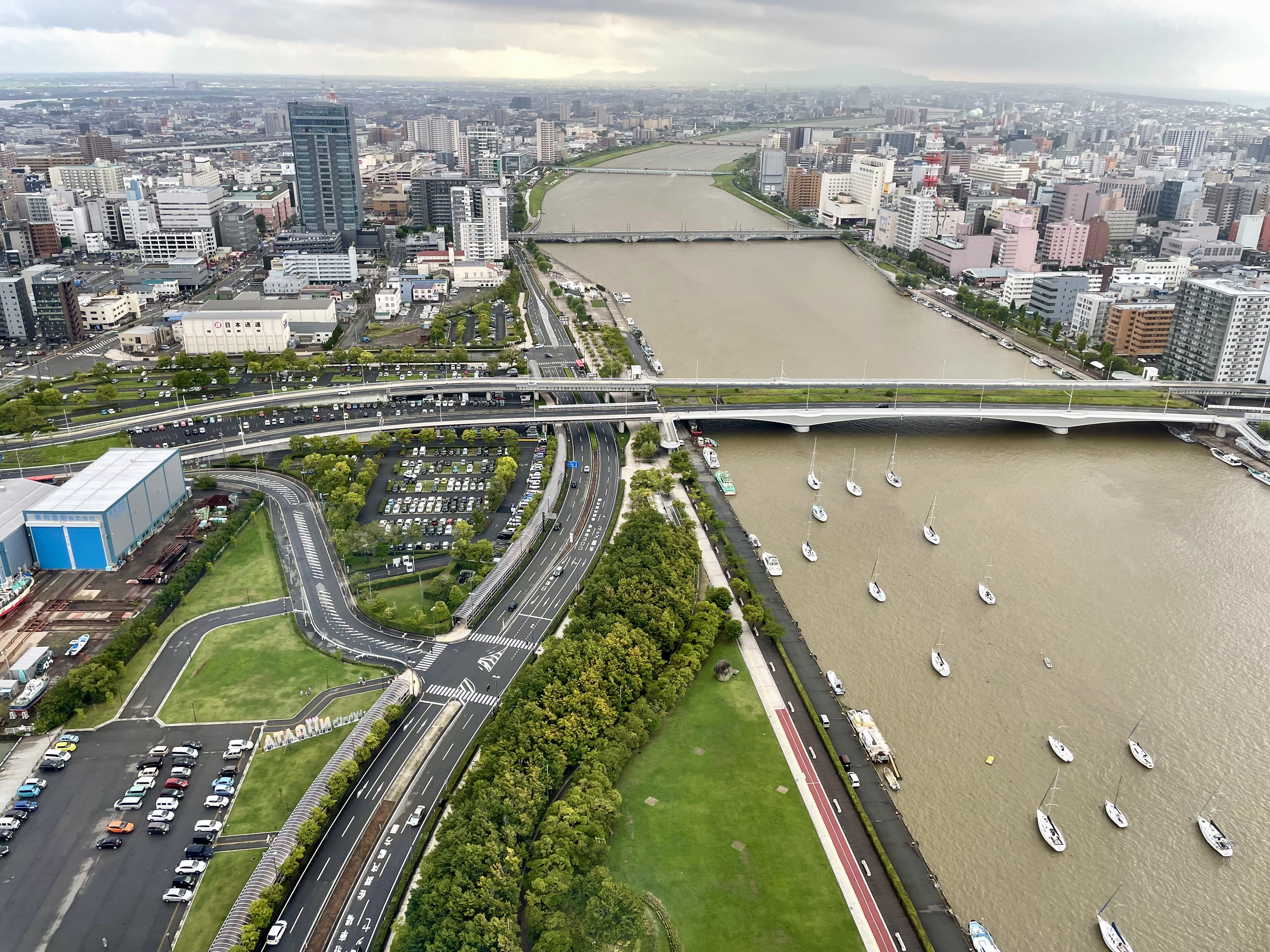
Observation Deck at Toki Messe
