= Next21 =

Skyscraper in Niigata, Japan

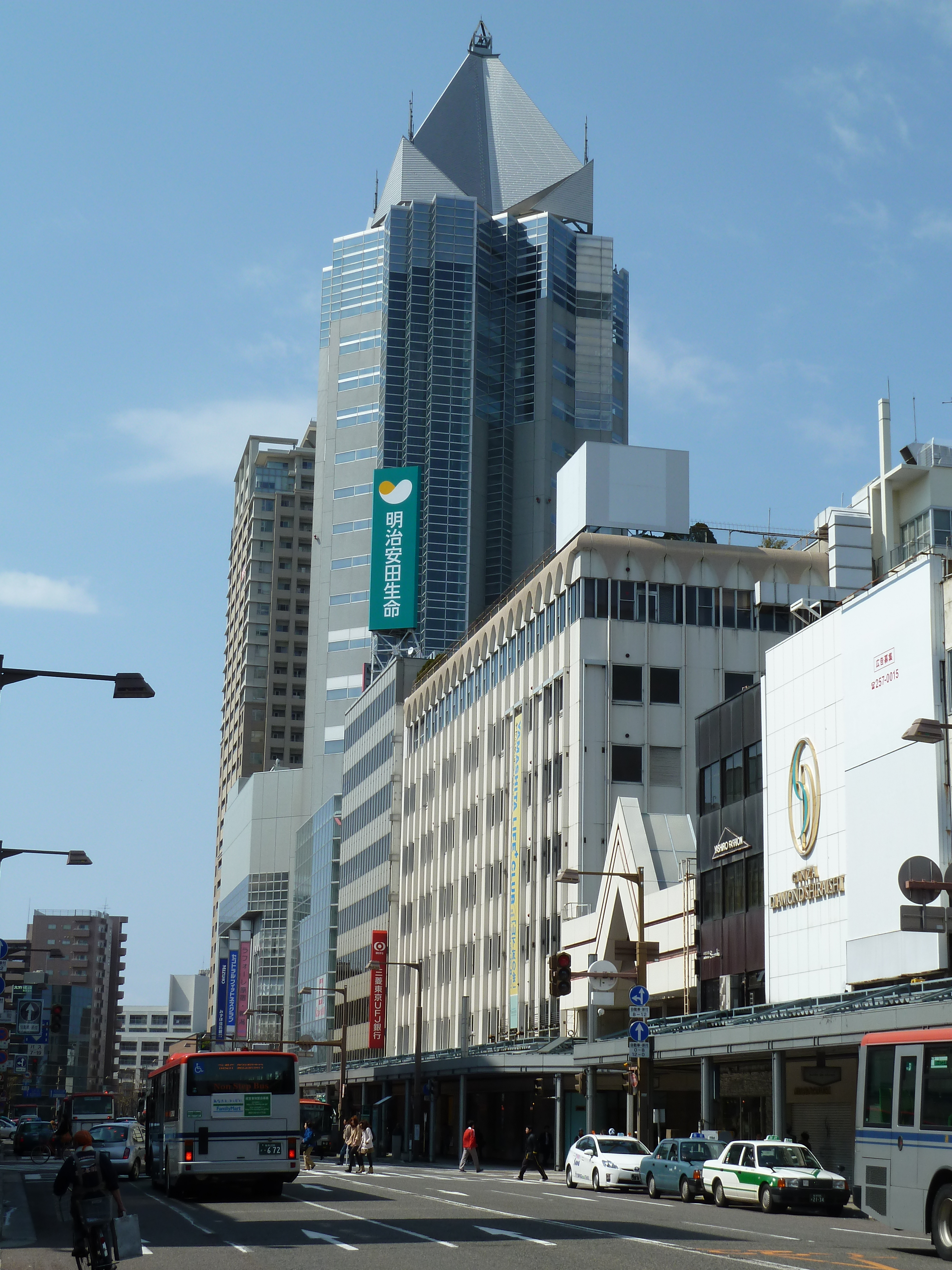
- Next21 in Furumachi
- Interactive map of the Next21 area

General information
- Location: 6-866 Nishibori-dori, Niigata City, Niigata Prefecture, Japan
- Coordinates: 37°55′21″N 139°2′35.8″E
- Construction started: 1993
- Completed: 1994
- Opened: May 1994

Height
- Roof: 128 m (420 ft)

Technical details
- Floor count: 21

Next21 is a skyscraper in Niigata, Japan, that includes shopping and office facilities. The building is 128 meters (420 feet) tall and has 21 floors. It is located in Furumachi, one of Niigata's central business districts.

== Objectives ==
It is an experimental housing project consisting of 18 units, designed to reflect the lifestyle of urban households in the 21st century. The project was initiated by Osaka Gas Corporation in collaboration with the NEXT21 planning team, while the basic plan and design were developed by the NEXT21 Construction Committee.

- Enhancing resource efficiency through systematized construction
- Offering a variety of residential units to meet the needs of different households
- Incorporating significant natural greenery within a high-rise building
- Establishing a wildlife habitat within an urban multi-family housing environment
- Managing waste and drainage on-site within the building
- Reducing the environmental impact of the building
- Utilizing energy efficiently, including the use of fuel cells
- Improving living comfort without increasing energy consumption.

== Access ==
The Bandai-bashi Line BRT Furumachi bus stop (Stop No. 06) is in front of the building.

== See also ==
- Bandai Bridge
- Toki Messe
- Niigata Nippo Media Ship
