= Niigata Seiryo University =

Private university in Niigata, Niigata, Japan

Coordinates: 37°55′15.3″N 139°1′33.1″E

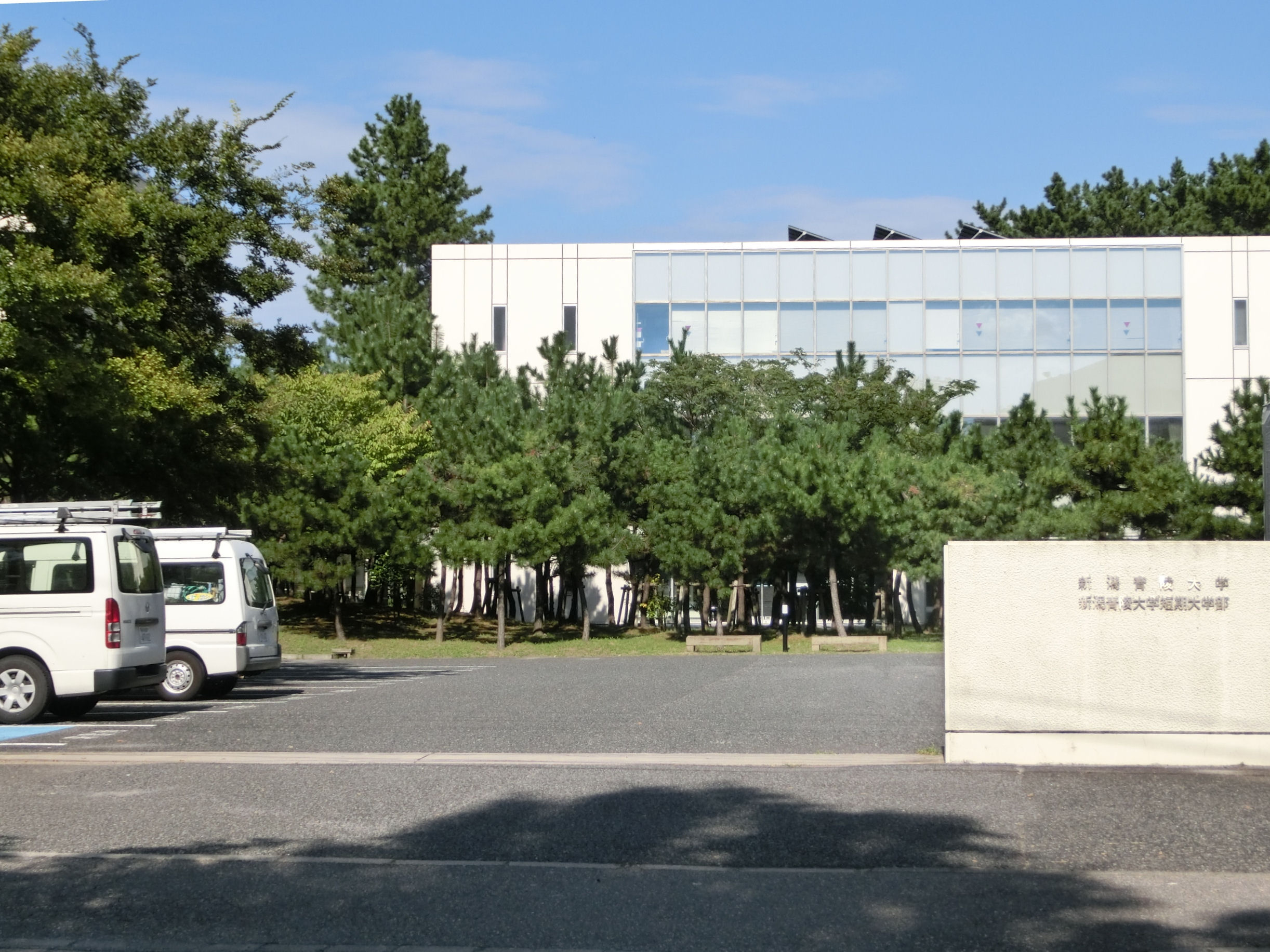
Niigata Seiryo University

Niigata Seiryo University (新潟青陵大学, Niigata seiryō daigaku) is a private university in Niigata, Niigata, Japan. The school originally opened as a women's junior college in 1965.

The university offers bachelor's and master's degrees in the following fields: nursing; and social welfare, psychology and child development. It is accredited by the Japan University Accreditation Association (JUAA).
