= Niigata City Performing Arts Center =

Public cultural facility in Chūō-Ku, Niigata, Japan

Coordinates: 37°54′48.4″N 139°2′25.7″E

- 新潟市民芸術文化会館
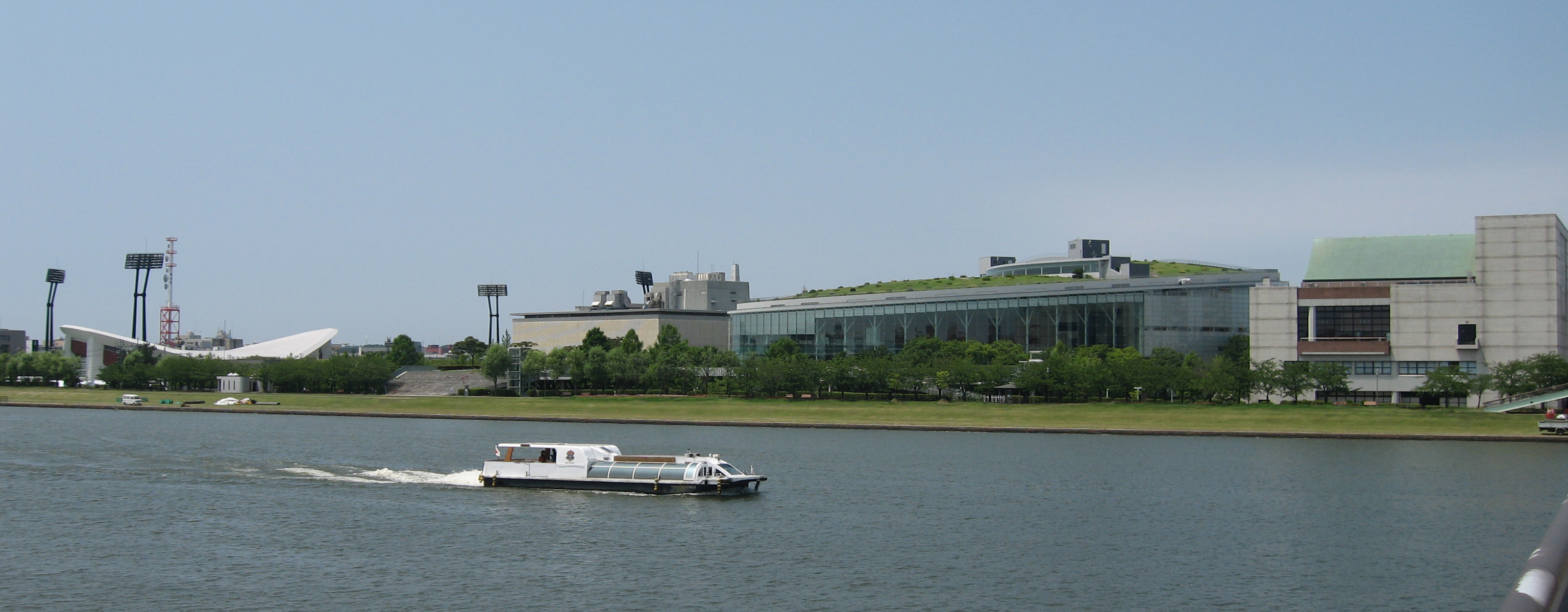
- Ryutopia (the glass-walled building) in Hakusan Park
- Interactive map of Niigata City Performing Arts Center
- Address: 3-2 Ichibanboridōri-chō, Chūō-ku, Niigata 951-8132
- Location: Japan
- Capacity: 1,890 + 903

Construction
- Opened: 22 October 1998

Website
- www.ryutopia.or.jp/en/

The Niigata City Performing Arts Center (新潟市民芸術文化会館, Niigata-shimin geijutsu-bunka-kaikan), also known as Ryutopia (りゅーとぴあ) is a large multi-purpose public cultural facility in Chūō-ku, Niigata, Japan, which opened on 22 October 1998.

== Access ==
=== Train / Car ===
The complex is located within Hakusan Park, and the nearest station to the facility is Hakusan Station on the JR Echigo Line, 20 minutes' walk away. It is 15 minutes by car from the main Niigata Station.

=== Teansit bus ===
There is a BRT "Bandai-bashi Line" bus stop 'Shiyakusyo-mae' (Stop No.08) near the facility. Also, Niigata City Loop Bus has a stop 'Hakusan Koen mae'.

== Notable alumni ==
- Yamato Kochi (born 1978), actor

== Surrounding area ==
- Hakusan Park
- Hakusan Shrine
- Niigata Prefectural Civic Center
- Niigata City Athletic Stadium
