= 1940 Shakotan earthquake =

Earthquake in Japan

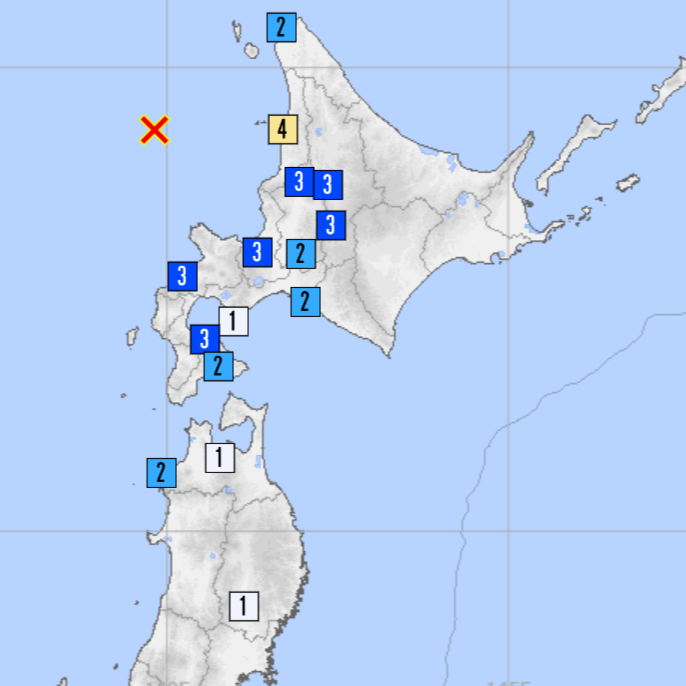
- JMA seismic intensity map and epicenter
- UTC time: 1940-08-01 15:08:24
- ISC event: 901515
- USGS-ANSS: ComCat
- Local date: August 2, 1940
- Local time: 00:08:22 JST
- Magnitude: 7.5 M_{w}
- Depth: 15 km (9.3 mi)
- Epicenter: 44.561°N 139.678°E
- Type: Thrust
- Areas affected: Japan, Russia, Korea
- Max. intensity: JMA 4
- Tsunami: Yes
- Casualties: 10 dead, 24 injured

The 1940 Shakotan earthquake occurred on August 2 at 00:08:22 JST with a moment magnitude (M_{w}) of 7.5 and maximum JMA seismic intensity of Shindo 4. The shock had an epicenter off the coast of Hokkaido, Japan. Damage from the shock was comparatively light, but the accompanying tsunami was destructive. The tsunami caused 10 deaths and 24 injuries on Hokkaido, and destroyed homes and boats across the Sea of Japan. The highest tsunami waves (5 m (16 ft)) were recorded at the coast of Russia while along the coast of Hokkaido, waves were about 2 m (6 ft 7 in).

== Tectonic setting ==
Japan is situated on a convergent boundary between the Pacific, Philippine Sea, Okhotsk and Amurian Plates. Along the island arc's east and southeast coast, subduction of the Pacific and Philippine Sea Plates occur at the Japan Trench and Nankai Trough, respectively.

The Sea of Japan located off Japan's west coast is a back-arc basin which formed from extensional and strike-slip tectonics in the early Miocene. East–west compression resulted in the formation of fold and thrust belts along its eastern margin during the late Pliocene. This tectonic feature between the Amurian and Okhotsk Plates is thought to be an incipient subduction zone consisting of eastward-dipping thrust faults since no Wadati–Benioff zone is detected. Earthquakes and tsunamis are produced on thrust faults that form the boundary, with magnitudes in the range of 6.8–7.9. Major earthquakes and tsunamis along this boundary occurred in 1833, 1741, 1940, 1964, 1983 and 1993—the 1741 tsunami was of volcanic origin. These earthquakes suggest deformation is ongoing and are accommodated along these fold and thrust belts.

== Earthquake ==
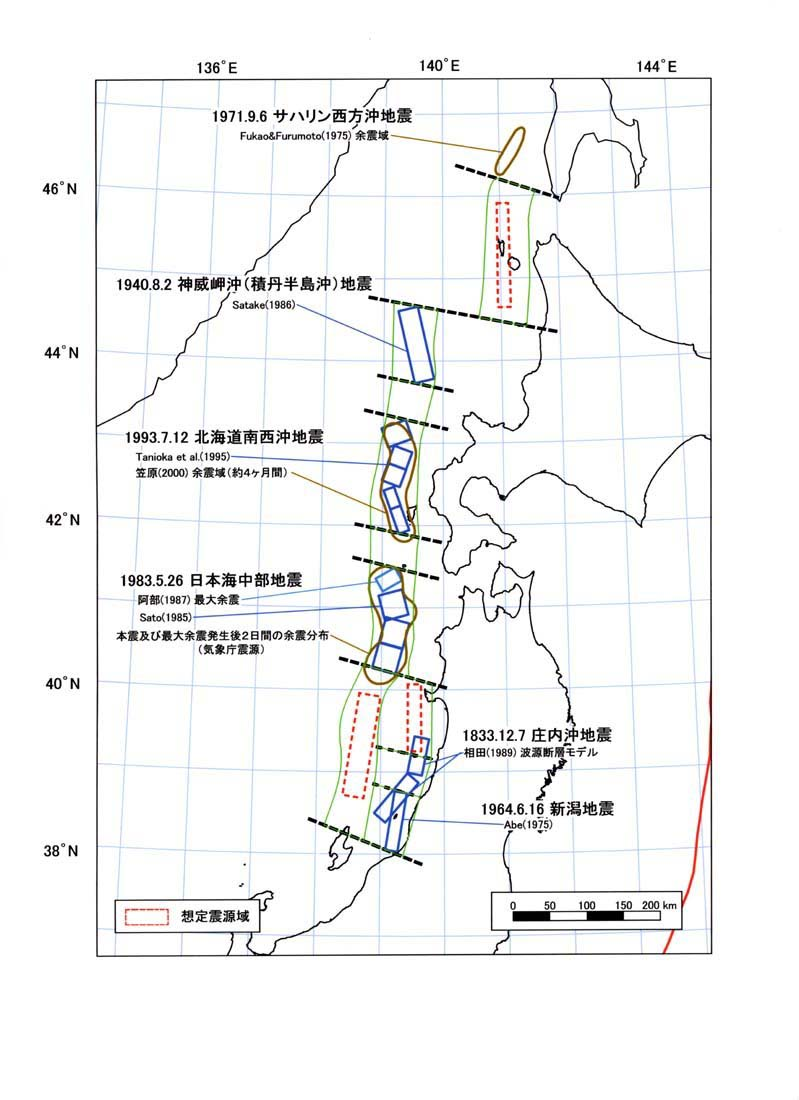
Earthquake rupture areas in the Sea of Japan

Seismicity along the eastern margin of the Sea of Japan extends from the west coast of Honshu and Hokkaido to Sakhalin in the north. The margin produced several large earthquakes during the 20th century—the 1940 earthquake ruptured a segment north of the 1993 event. A focal mechanism solution obtained for the 1940 shock corresponded to pure dip-slip (reverse) faulting on a near north–south striking plane. Seismologists have interpreted various rupture sizes for the earthquake in studies during the 1960s and 1980s. By using tsunami data, the source areas were 170 km (110 mi) × 70 km (43 mi) striking north-northwest–south-southeast, and 100 km (62 mi) × 35 km (22 mi). These reverse fault planes run parallel to the eastern margin of the Sea of Japan and are steeply-dipping.

The earthquake ruptured four faults extending north–south; the Kita-Oshoro, Oshoro, Minami Oshoro and Kaiyo faults. A dive survey around the earthquake source area in the 2000s revealed anticlines of the fold and thrust belt were affected by recent seismic shaking. The Oshoro and Minami Oshoro anticlines (fault underlying the anticline) showed evidence of a recently disturbed seafloor, but no turbidites, indicating the Oshoro and Minami Oshoro faults ruptured during the event. Only the southern portion of the Kita-Oshoro ruptured—the fault may be the northern extent of rupture. Slip along the Oshoro and Minami Oshoro faults were estimated using seismic inversion of tsunami waveform at 2.2 m (7 ft 3 in) and 2.7 m (8 ft 10 in), respectively. Slip on the Kita-Oshoro and Kaiyo faults were estimated at 1.6 m (5 ft 3 in) and 0.6 m (2 ft 0 in), respectively.

The International Seismological Centre catalogued the shock at 7.5 M_{w} with a depth of 15 km (9.3 mi). The Japan Meteorological Agency listed the earthquake at 7.5 M_{JMA}. Many aftershocks of "very small" magnitudes followed. The aftershock activity decreased with an unusually sudden rate. These were distributed across an estimated 190 km (120 mi)-long zone.

== Tsunami ==
The tsunami was generally moderate around Hokkaido and larger at distant places (Korea and Russia). All along the coast of Hokkaido, the tsunami wave was generally under 2 m (6 ft 7 in). On Rishiri Island and the port of Tomamae along Hokkaido's west coast, the tsunami measured 3 m (9.8 ft). A tidal gauge in Iwanai, Hokkaido recorded a 1.7 m (5 ft 7 in) tsunami. Along the coast of Korea, 2 m (6 ft 7 in) waves were observed, while at Rudnaya Pristan and Kamenka along the Primorsky Krai coast, waves measured 3.5 m (11 ft) and 5 m (16 ft), respectively.

== Damage ==
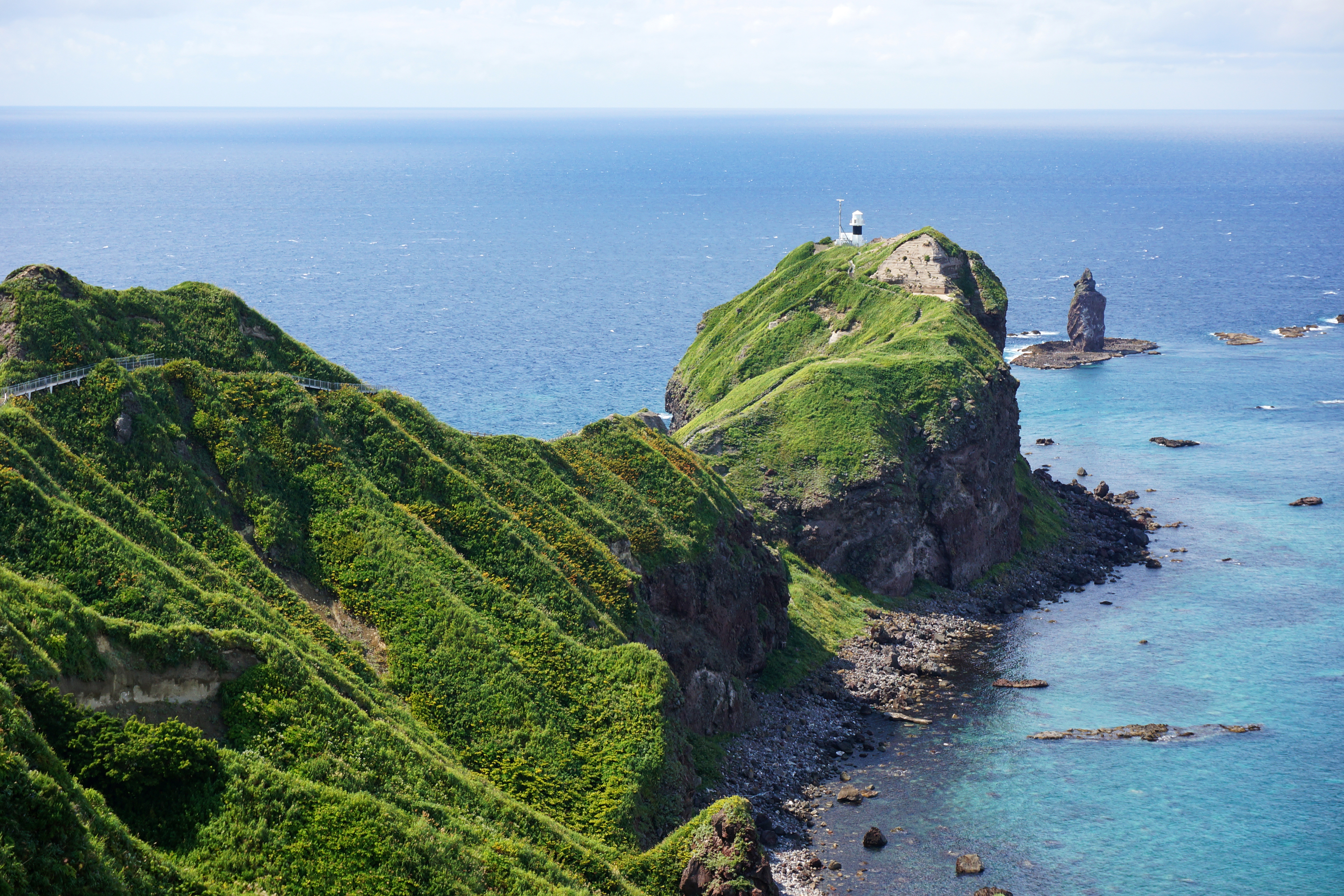
Cape Kamui, Shakotan, where the tsunami killed 10 people

Damage caused by seismic shaking was light; the reported JMA seismic intensities were Shindo 4 at Haboro and Shindo 3 at Sapporo, Morimachi, Suttsu, Ishikari-Numata, Asahikawa, and Furano. Shaking was felt across all of western Hokkaido and parts of Russia. Weak shaking was observed at Muroran, Aomori, Mizusawa in Iwate Prefecture and Tsukubsan, Ibaraki Prefecture.

The tsunami swept away thousands of fishing boats and timber at Hokkaido, Primorsky Krai and Sakhalin. On the Shakotan Peninsula, the waves killed 10 people, destroyed 20 homes, swept away 644 boats, and damaged a further 612. The deaths occurred at the estuary of the Teshio River. Twenty four people were injured. At Shiribeshi, a fishing boat sunk and 20 were lost; at Sōya, 550 boats were lost and 189 were destroyed. Fourteen buildings were completely destroyed; another 43 partially ruined at Rumoi. Fires destroyed 26 buildings and the remaining were destroyed by the tsunami. Seven hundred and twenty one fishing boats were damaged or destroyed; including a motor ship which sunk. Damage in the town was estimated at 260,000 yen. Slight damage occurred on Sado Island and in northern Korea, attributed to the tsunami.

At Kamenka, the tsunami struck at 01:00 on August 2. It carried three motor torpedo boats inland, where they were dumped on peatland between the Oprichninka and Pryamaya Pad rivers. Large portions of Zarechnaya and Naberezhnaya streets, near the Pryamaya Pad river were flooded. A fish processing factory was flooded at its first level. There were no deaths or injuries associated.

== See also ==
- List of earthquakes in 1940
- List of earthquakes in Japan
