= 1833 Shōnai earthquake =

Earthquake in Japan

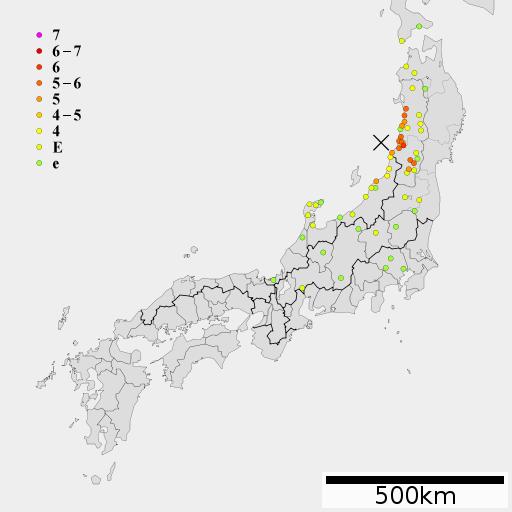
- Local date: December 7, 1833
- Local time: 15:00–16:00 JST
- Magnitude: 7.98 M_{w}, 7.5–7.7 M_{JMA}
- Epicenter: 38.9°N 139.25°E
- Areas affected: Chūbu region, Japan
- Max. intensity: JMA 6+
- Tsunami: 12.9 m (42 ft)
- Casualties: 150 dead

The Shōnai offshore earthquake (Japanese: 庄内沖地震, Hepburn: Shōnai-oki Jishin) occurred at around 14:00 on December 7, 1833. It struck with an epicenter in the Sea of Japan, off the coast of Yamagata Prefecture, Japan. A tsunami was triggered by the estimated M_{JMA} 7.5–7.7 earthquake. One hundred and fifty people were killed and there was severe damage in the prefecture.

== Tectonic setting ==
Japan is situated on a convergent boundary between the Pacific, Philippine Sea, Okhotsk and Amurian Plates. Along the island arc's east and southeast coast, subduction of the Pacific and Philippine Sea plates occur at the Japan Trench and Nankai Trough, respectively. The west coast of Honshu, bordering the Sea of Japan, is a north–south trending convergent boundary. This boundary between the Amurian and Okhotsk Plates is thought to be an incipient subduction zone, consisting of eastward-dipping thrust faults. Convergent tectonics have been occurring in the region since the end of the Pliocene. Earthquakes and tsunamis are produced on thrust faults that form the boundary, with magnitudes in the range of 6.8–7.9. Major earthquakes and tsunamis along this boundary occurred in 1741, 1940, 1964, 1983 and 1993, although the origin of the 1741 tsunami remains open to debate.

== Earthquake ==
The earthquake ruptured the convergent boundary faults of the eastern margin of the Sea of Japan. The rupture zone partially overlaps that of the 1964 earthquake which struck in the same area, although parts of the rupture area extended north. Seismic shaking was observed across Akita, Yamagata, and Niigata prefectures. Research papers provided various locations for the epicenter including 26 km (16 mi) off the coast of Atsumi, 50 km (31 mi) off the coast of Sakata or along the eastern margin. The earthquake had an estimated JMA magnitude (M_{JMA}) of 7.5–7.7, similar to the 1964 earthquake, while the tsunami magnitude (M_{t}) was 8.1. The JMA magnitude was calculated based on the seismic intensities recorded during the earthquake. To explain the tsunami observations, two rectangular faults were modelled. The estimated dimension of the first and northern rupture is 50 km (31 mi) long and 40 km (25 mi) across. The southern rupture measures 70 km (43 mi) by 40 km (25 mi). Both planes dip 60° to the east and a maximum displacement of 8 m (26 ft) was estimated. The model also indicated a moment magnitude of 7.98. A seismic gap exist between the rupture areas of the 1833 and 1983 earthquakes, which is capable of generating a magnitude 7.5 earthquake.

== Tsunami ==
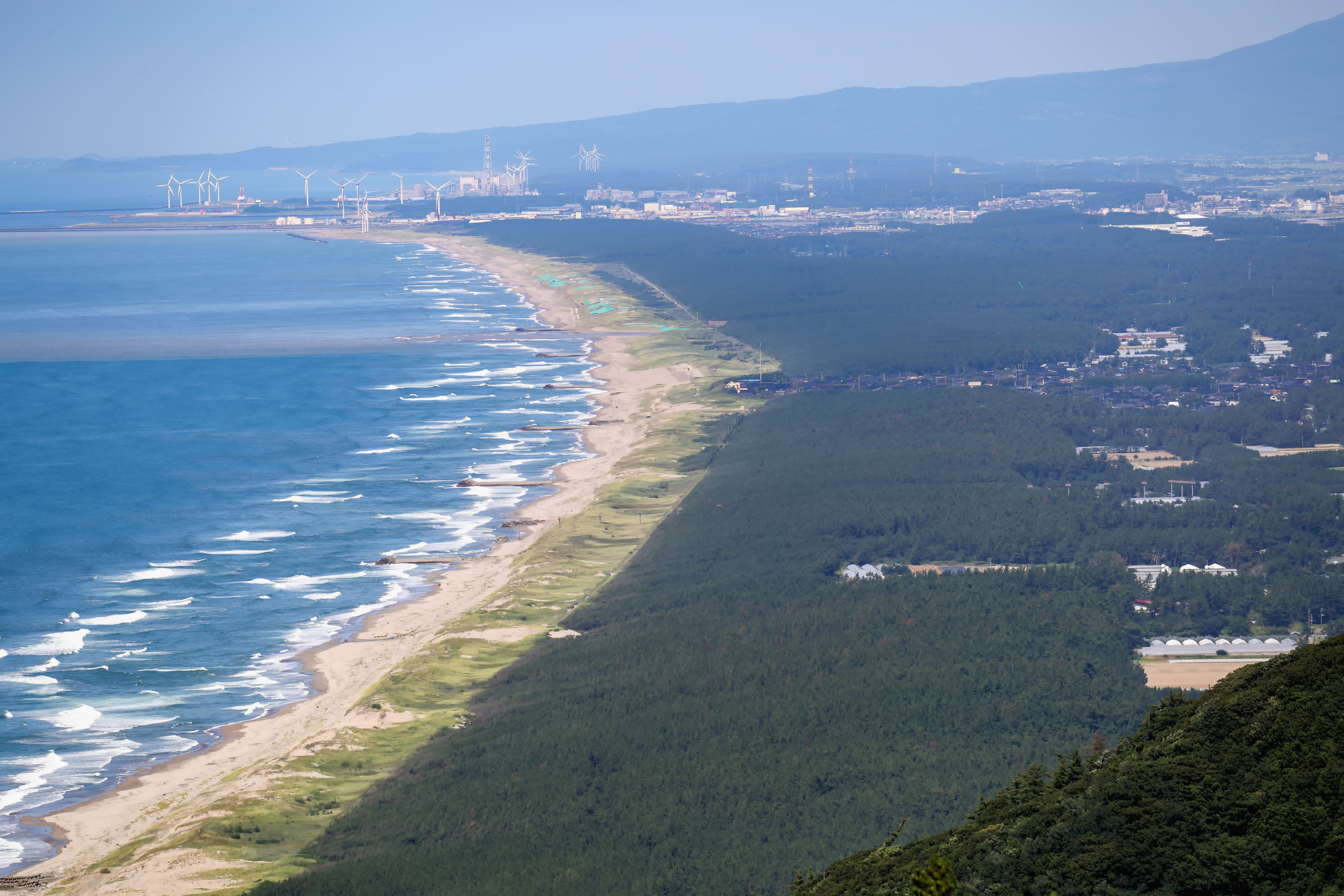
The Shōnai coast which was inundated by the 1833 tsunami.

Waves of more than 5 m (16 ft) were recorded along the coast of Akita, Yamagata, and Niigata prefectures while the maximum run-up was 12.9 m (42 ft) in Katanorizawa. It is thought to be one of the largest tsunami in the Sea of Japan. The tsunami reached a height of 7–8 m (23–26 ft) at Kamomoya, Yamagata Prefecture, and large waves were reported along a 30–50 km (19–31 mi) stretch of coastline. In Kisakata (Akita) and Ajigasawa (Aomori), waves 4–5 m (13–16 ft) struck. The tsunami measured 1–3 m (3 ft 3 in – 9 ft 10 in) in Izumozaki, Niigata. Waves exceeding 5 m (16 ft) was reported from Kamo (8 m (26 ft)) to Fuya (7 m (23 ft)). Waves were described as "strong" in Tsuruoka. It traveled 2.5 km (1.6 mi) upstream. At Sakaiminato, Tottori, the tsunami measured 2.3 m (7 ft 7 in). At Wajima on the Noto Peninsula, the tsunami reached 5.8 m (19 ft).

== Impact ==
A total of 150 fatalities resulted. According to various sources, between 360 and 600 homes were washed away by the tsunami or destroyed in the shaking. Another 1,790 homes sustained partial destruction. In the Shonai region, 158 houses and 322 boats and ships were lost. An estimated 38 residents died in the tsunami. At Sado, 123 homes were destroyed. An additional 47 people died in Wajima, on the Noto Peninsula. A maximum JMA seismic intensity 6 was estimated in an area measuring 80 km (50 mi) in length from Niigata to Yamagata prefectures. Seismic intensity 5 extended 250 km (160 mi) from Niigata to Akita to the Yamagata basin along the Mogami River. Shaking resulted in the partial destruction of Tsuruoka, Oyama, Makisone, Yosida, Okushinden, and Hironoshinden. Generally, damage in the region in proportion to the number of buildings was not great. The greatest damage was reported along the coast. Liquefaction was observed at Matsugasaki, Sado.

== See also ==
- List of earthquakes in Japan
- List of historical earthquakes
