= 1983 Guinea earthquake =

Earthquake in West Africa

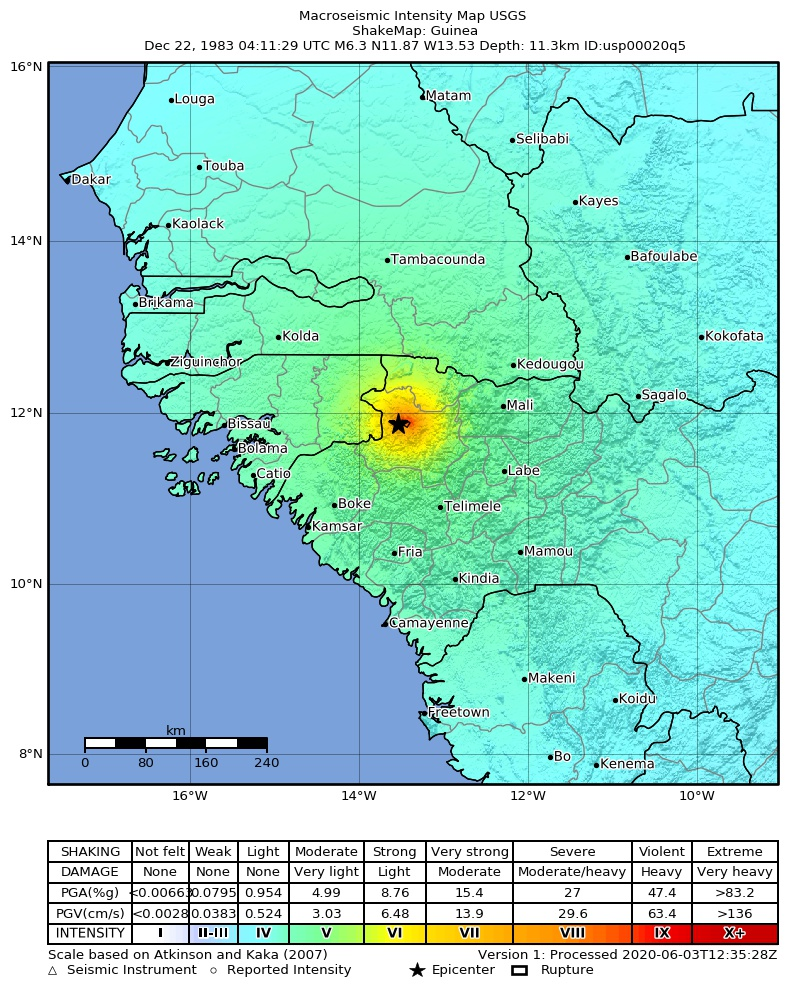
- USGS ShakeMap

- Location within Guinea
- UTC time: 1983-12-22 04:11:29
- ISC event: 563420
- USGS-ANSS: ComCat
- Local date: December 22, 1983
- Local time: 04:11
- Magnitude: 6.3 M_{w}
- Depth: 11.3 km (7 mi)
- Epicenter: 11.866°N 13.529°W
- Type: Oblique – Normal
- Max. intensity: MMI IX (Violent)
- Casualties: 300 dead, 1,500 injured, 200 missing

On December 22, 1983, an earthquake with a magnitude of 6.3 struck northern Guinea, killing around 300 people, and injuring 1,500. Around 200 people went missing. An earthquake of this magnitude was unusual for this region of West Africa, which was previously believed by most seismologists to be aseismic. The earthquake destroyed 5,000 houses. It had an intensity of IX (Violent) on the Mercalli intensity scale, although USGS reported it as VIII (Severe). The earthquake caused cracks in the ground, and an entire cavern to collapse.

== Geology ==
The earthquake occurred on the edge of the Paleozoic Bové Basin, near the western margin of the Precambrian West African Craton and close to the southern end of the late Proterozoic to Hercynian Mauritanide Belt.

== Impact ==
The New York Times, citing the national radio, reported that at least 16 settlements were razed. Several towns including Labe, Gaoual, Mamou and Kindia suffered heavy damage. In Gaoual, at least 143 people were killed. The earthquake also left several thousand people homeless.

== See also ==
- Geology of Guinea
- List of earthquakes in 1983
