= List of earthquakes in 1983 =

Earthquakes in 1983
Approximate epicenters of the earthquakes in 1983
- 4.0–5.9 magnitude
- 6.0–6.9 magnitude
- 7.0–7.9 magnitude
- 8.0+ magnitude
- Strongest: 7.6 M_{w} Papua New Guinea
- Deadliest: 6.8 M_{w} Turkey; 1,342 deaths
- Total fatalities: 2,608

Number by magnitude
- 9.0+: 0
- 8.0–8.9: 0
- 7.0–7.9: 14
- 6.0–6.9: 125
- 5.0–5.9: 1,664
- 4.0–4.9: 3,517

This is a list of earthquakes in 1983. Only earthquakes of magnitude 6 or above are included, unless they result in damage and/or casualties, or are notable for some other reason. Events in remote areas will not be listed but included in statistics and maps. Countries are entered on the lists in order of their status in this particular year. All dates are listed according to UTC time. Maximum intensities are indicated on the Mercalli intensity scale and are sourced from United States Geological Survey (USGS) ShakeMap data.

== By death toll ==
Rank	Death toll	Magnitude	Location	MMI	Depth (km)	Date
1	1,342	6.8	Turkey, Erzurum Province	IX (Violent)	11.6	October 30
2	663	6.3	Guinea, Boke Region	IX (Violent)	11.3	December 22
3	350	5.5	Colombia, Cauca Department	VIII (Severe)	22.2	March 31
4	104	7.4	Japan, eastern Sea of Japan	VIII (Severe)	23.7	May 26
5	34	5.7	China, Shandong Province	VII (Very strong)	19.0	November 6
6	30	5.2	Iran, Mazandaran Province	IV (Light)	33.0	March 25
7	26	7.4	Afghanistan, Badakhshan Province	VII (Very strong)	214.5	December 30
8	16	6.5	Philippines, Luzon	VIII (Severe)	28.8	August 17
9	12	4.7	Yugoslavia, Skopje Statistical Region, North Macedonia	VII (Very strong)	24.4	February 25
10	10	7.0	Peru, Department of Amazonas, Peru	VII (Very strong)	104.2	April 12
10	10	6.4	Papua New Guinea, East New Britain Province	VI (Strong)	26.0	December 22

Listed are earthquakes with at least 10 dead.

== By magnitude ==
Rank	Magnitude	Death toll	Location	MMI	Depth (km)	Date
1	7.6	0	Papua New Guinea, southeast of New Ireland	VII (Very strong)	88.8	March 18
2	7.4	104	Japan, eastern Sea of Japan	VIII (Severe)	23.7	May 26
2	7.4	5	Chile, Atacama Region	VIII (Severe)	14.8	October 4
2	7.4	26	Afghanistan, Badakhshan Province	VII (Very strong)	214.5	December 30
5	7.3	0	Indonesia, Banda Sea	VI (Strong)	178.5	November 24
5	7.3	0	United Kingdom, Chagos Archipelago	VI (Strong)	10.0	November 30
7	7.2	0	United Kingdom, South Sandwich Islands	( )	24.0	October 22
8	7.1	6	Costa Rica, Puntarenas Province	VIII (Severe)	37.0	April 3
8	7.1	0	Soviet Union, Kamchatka Peninsula, Russia	VII (Very strong)	62.6	August 17
10	7.0	0	Greece, Ionian Islands	VIII (Severe)	14.3	January 17
10	7.0	0	New Zealand, Kermadec Islands	( )	238.0	January 26
10	7.0	10	Peru, Department of Amazonas, Peru	VII (Very strong)	104.2	April 12
10	7.0	0	Iran, Sistan and Baluchistan Province	VII (Very strong)	64.0	April 18
10	7.0	0	Guatemala, off the west coast	VII (Very strong)	67.1	December 2

Listed are earthquakes with at least 7.0 magnitude.

== By month ==
=== January ===
January
- Strongest: 7.0 M_{w} 2 events reached this magnitude
- Total fatalities: 0

Number by magnitude
- 8.0–8.9: 0
- 7.0–7.9: 2
- 6.0–6.9: 11
- 5.0–5.9: 155
- 4.0–4.9: 382

Date	Country and location	M_{w}	Depth (km)	MMI	Notes	Casualties	
Date	Country and location	M_{w}	Depth (km)	MMI	Notes	Dead	Injured
1	Bolivia, La Paz Department (Bolivia)	6.3	172.0				
8	Tonga	6.4	33.0				
16	Papua New Guinea, off the east coast	6.7	234.9	IV	Some damage was caused to communications systems.		
17	Greece, Ionian Islands	7.0	14.3	VIII	Some damage was caused.		
24	Mexico, off the coast of Oaxaca	6.3	56.8	VII	Some damage was caused.		
24	India, Andaman Islands	6.8	78.0	VI			
26	New Zealand, Kermadec Islands	7.0	238.0				

=== February ===
February
- Strongest: 6.9 M_{w} Chile
- Deadliest: 4.7 M_{w} Yugoslavia, Macedonia SR; 12 deaths
- Total fatalities: 12

Number by magnitude
- 8.0–8.9: 0
- 7.0–7.9: 0
- 6.0–6.9: 9
- 5.0–5.9: 115
- 4.0–4.9: 279

Date	Country and location	M_{w}	Depth (km)	MMI	Notes	Casualties	
Date	Country and location	M_{w}	Depth (km)	MMI	Notes	Dead	Injured
12	Philippines, southeast of Mindanao	6.3	51.0	IV			
13	China, Xinjiang Province	6.2	16.1	VIII	2 injuries were reported as well as damage.		2
13	United States, north of Guam	5.7	105.0	IV	1 person was injured and minor damage was reported.		1
14	United States, southeast of Alaska Peninsula	6.5	47.0	V			
20	Philippines, southeast of Mindanao	6.4	60.5	IV			
25	Yugoslavia, Skopje Statistical Region, Macedonia SR	4.7	24.4	VII	12 people died after suffering heart attacks. Some damage was reported with costs reaching $500,000 (1983 rate).	12	
25	Chile, Arica y Parinacota Region	6.9	146.0	VI	Minor damage was caused.		
26	Soviet Union, Districts under Central Government Jurisdiction, Tajikistan	5.3	49.2	VII	Major damage was caused.		
27	Japan, Chiba Prefecture, Honshu	5.9	78.3	V	11 people were injured.		11

=== March ===
March
- Strongest: 7.6 M_{w} Papua New Guinea
- Deadliest: 5.5 M_{w} Colombia; 350 deaths
- Total fatalities: 381

Number by magnitude
- 8.0–8.9: 0
- 7.0–7.9: 1
- 6.0–6.9: 9
- 5.0–5.9: 119
- 4.0–4.9: 321

Date	Country and location	M_{w}	Depth (km)	MMI	Notes	Casualties	
Date	Country and location	M_{w}	Depth (km)	MMI	Notes	Dead	Injured
8	Venezuela, off the coast of Sucre (state)	5.9	82.4	IV	10 people were injured whilst evacuating buildings.		10
10	Soviet Union, Kuril Islands, Russia	6.2	33.0				
12	Indonesia, south of Ambon Island	6.0	33.0	V	Foreshock to following event.		
12	Indonesia, south of Ambon Island	6.7	16.9	VI	Some damage was reported. A tsunami was observed locally.		
15	Japan, Shizuoka Prefecture, Honshu	5.3	43.2	IV	1 person was killed and 2 were injured. Some damage was reported.	1	2
15	Philippines, southeast of Mindanao	6.7	41.0	IV			
18	Papua New Guinea, southeast of New Ireland (island)	7.6	88.8	VII	Property damage and landslides were caused by the shaking. A tsunami was observed in the area.		
20	Papua New Guinea, southeast of New Ireland (island)	6.4	80.1	VI	Aftershock of March 18 event.		
21	Tonga, southwest of Tongatapu	6.7	68.0	VI			
23	Greece, Ionian Islands	6.4	19.1	VII	7 people were injured. 160 homes sustained damage. Aftershock of January 17 event.		7
25	Iran, Mazandaran Province	5.2	33.0	IV	30 people were killed and 61 were hurt. Many homes were damaged with costs reaching $5 million (1983 rate).	30	61
31	Colombia, Cauca Department	5.5	22.2	VIII	Despite the moderate magnitude the 1983 Popayan earthquake caused major destruction in the area. Up to 350 people died and 1,200 were injured. $410.9 million (1983 rate) worth of damage was caused.	350	1,200

=== April ===
April
- Strongest: 7.1 M_{w} Costa Rica
- Deadliest: 7.1 M_{w} Costa Rica; 6 deaths
- Total fatalities: 6

Number by magnitude
- 8.0–8.9: 0
- 7.0–7.9: 3
- 6.0–6.9: 5

Date	Country and location	M_{w}	Depth (km)	MMI	Notes	Casualties	
Date	Country and location	M_{w}	Depth (km)	MMI	Notes	Dead	Injured
3	Costa Rica, 12 North of Golfito	7.1	37.0	VII	5 people died from heart attacks, another was killed from a collapsed building and 4 people were injured.	6	4
4	Indonesia, 68 km Southwest of Sabang	6.9	78.5	VII	Some damage in Banda Aceh	-	-
4	Russian SFSR, Kuril Islands	6.5	51.0	V	-	-	-
8	Yemen, Owen fracture zone	6.7	10.0	I	-	-	-
12	Peru, 92 km northeast of La Peca	7.0	104.2	VII	-	-	-
18	Iran, Saravan	7.0	64.0	VII	-	-	-
24	Solomon Islands, 124 km Southeast of Gizo	6.4	12.4	VII	-	-	-
30	Japan, Hokkaido	6.5	30.4	V	-	-	-

=== May ===
May
- Strongest: 7.4 M_{w} Japan
- Deadliest: 7.4 M_{w} Japan; 104 deaths
- Total fatalities: 104

Number by magnitude
- 8.0–8.9: 0
- 7.0–7.9: 3
- 6.0–6.9: 4

Date	Country and location	M_{w}	Depth (km)	MMI	Notes	Casualties	
Date	Country and location	M_{w}	Depth (km)	MMI	Notes	Dead	Injured
2	United States, California	6.7	9.6	VIII	The 1983 Coalinga earthquake destroyed an 8-story building in Coalinga, 94 people were injured.	-	94
10	Papua New Guinea, Kimbe	6.5	112.4	VI	-	-	-
10	Papua New Guinea, Kokopo	6.7	71.6	VI	-	-	-
15	Tonga, 168 km Northwest of Pangai	6.5	33.0	I	-	-	-
26	Japan, Japanese Sea	7.4	23.7	VII	The 1983 Sea of Japan earthquake was One of the largest earthquakes in 1983, 104 people were killed and 324 were injured.	104	324

=== June ===
June
- Strongest: 6.9 M_{w} Vietnam
- Total fatalities: 0

Number by magnitude
- 8.0–8.9: 0
- 7.0–7.9: 0
- 6.0–6.9: 6

Date	Country and location	M_{w}	Depth (km)	MMI	Notes	Casualties	
Date	Country and location	M_{w}	Depth (km)	MMI	Notes	Dead	Injured
1	Tonga, 147 km Southwest of Hihifo	6.6	179.6	II	-	-	-
9	Japan, Southern Hokkaido	6.3	28.0	V	This Was an Aftershock to the 7.8 earthquake on May 26.	-	-
21	Japan, 122 km Northwest of Hokkaido	6.7	9.9	V	An aftershock to the 7.8 earthquake on May 26, some damage was caused and a 1.0 m (3 ft 3 in) high tsunami was observed.	-	-
21	Taiwan, Chinese Sea	6.4	36.9	V	-	-	-
24	Vietnam, 45 km Northeast of Dien Bien Phu	6.3	18.4	VII	–	-	-

=== July ===
July
- Strongest: 6.9 M_{w} United Kingdom
- Deadliest: 6.1 M_{w} Turkey; 5 deaths
- Total fatalities: 7

Number by magnitude
- 8.0–8.9: 0
- 7.0–7.9: 0
- 6.0–6.9: 7

Date	Country and location	M_{w}	Depth (km)	MMI	Notes	Casualties	
Date	Country and location	M_{w}	Depth (km)	MMI	Notes	Dead	Injured
3	Costa Rica, 17 km South of Pejibaye	6.5	33.0	VII	2 people were killed and 60 were injured.	2	60
5	France, Southeast of the Loyalty Islands, New Caledonia	6.5	33.0	III	-	-	-
5	Turkey, 10 km North of Biga	6.1	10.0	IX	The 1983 Biga earthquake Killed 5 People and Injured 26 More.	5	26
11	United Kingdom, South Shetland Islands	6.9	10.0	IV	-	-	-
12	United States, 37 km Northwest of Tatitlek, Alaska	6.6	37.0	VI	Some Damage Occurred in Valdez	-	-
24	Soviet Union, 82 km North of Yelizovo, Russia	6.2	180.4	IV	-	-	-
24	Indonesia, 49 km North of Komodo	6.4	48.1	VI	-	-	-

=== August ===
August
- Strongest: 7.1 M_{w} (Russian Soviet Federative Socialist Republic) Russia
- Deadliest: 6.5 M_{w} Philippines; 16 deaths
- Total fatalities: 16

Number by magnitude
- 8.0–8.9: 0
- 7.0–7.9: 1
- 6.0–6.9: 4

Date	Country and location	M_{w}	Depth (km)	MMI	Notes	Casualties	
Date	Country and location	M_{w}	Depth (km)	MMI	Notes	Dead	Injured
6	Greece, Aegean Sea	6.8	2.4	VII	Some Damage Occurred to Buildings	-	-
17	(Russian Soviet Federative Socialist Republic) Russia, Kamchatka	7.1	62.6	VII	-	-	-
17	Philippines, 16 km Northeast of Piddig	6.5	28.8	VIII	16 people were killed and 47 people were injured.	16	47
25	Japan, Hiroshima	6.5	126.4	V	One Person was Injured and Some Landslides Occurred.	-	1
30	Tonga, 201 Southeast of Hihifo	6.1	38.7	IV	-	-	-

=== September ===
September
- Strongest: 6.7 M_{w} (France) Wallis and Futuna
- Total fatalities: 0

Number by magnitude
- 8.0–8.9: 0
- 7.0–7.9: 0
- 6.0–6.9: 4

Date	Country and location	M_{w}	Depth (km)	MMI	Notes	Casualties	
Date	Country and location	M_{w}	Depth (km)	MMI	Notes	Dead	Injured
7	United States, 46 km Northwest of Tatitlek, Alaska	6.4	45.0	VI	Some Damage Occurred in Anchorage.	-	-
12	Afghanistan, Badakhshan	6.2	208.8	IV	Some Damage Occurred in Kashmir, Pakistan.	-	-
15	Mexico, Chiapas	6.3	115.2	V	-	-	-
17	(France) Wallis and Futuna	6.7	33.0	IV	-	-	-

=== October ===
October
- Strongest: 7.4 M_{w} Chile
- Deadliest: 6.8 M_{w} Turkey; 1,342 deaths
- Total fatalities: 1,349

Number by magnitude
- 8.0–8.9: 0
- 7.0–7.9: 2
- 6.0–6.9: 5

Date	Country and location	M_{w}	Depth (km)	MMI	Notes	Casualties	
Date	Country and location	M_{w}	Depth (km)	MMI	Notes	Dead	Injured
4	Chile, Atacama Region	7.4	14.8	VIII	At least 5 people were killed, and 24 people were injured.	5	24
6	Kazakh Soviet Socialist Republic, 94 km southeast of Kurchatov	6.0	1.0	II	This earthquake was caused by an Underground nuclear explosion	-	-
15	Solomon Islands offshore, 58 km West of Gizo	6.5	7.4	VI	-	-	-
16	Indonesia, 231 Northwest of Gorontalo	6.5	40.1	VII	At least 17 buildings had collapsed in the epicentral area.	-	-
22	United Kingdom, South Sandwich Islands	7.2	24.0	VI	-	-	-
28	United States, Idaho	6.9	10.0	IX	The 1983 Borah Peak earthquake was the largest earthquake ever recorded in Idaho, 2 people were killed with an equal amount injured.	2	2
30	Turkey, 27 km East of Narman	6.8	11.6	IX	The 1983 Erzurum earthquake completely destroyed 50 villages in Erzurum and Kars, 1,342 people were Killed and 534 people were injured.	1,342	534
