= 2026 Guerrero earthquake =

Earthquake in Mexico

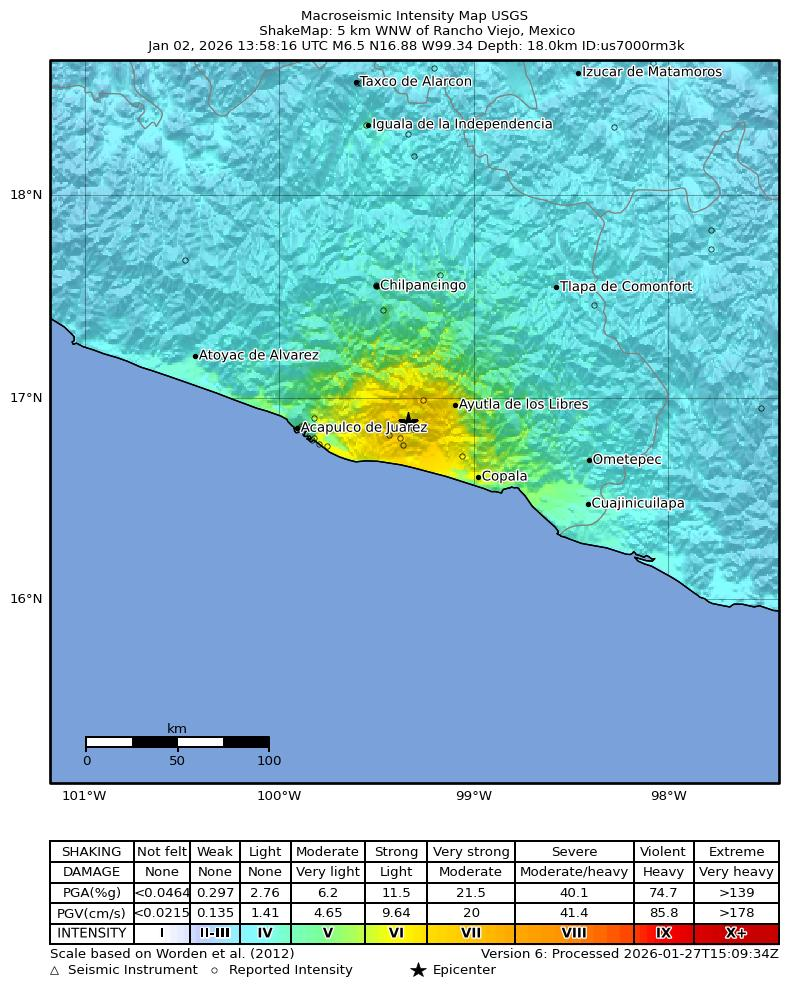
- USGS ShakeMap

- Location within Mexico
- UTC time: 2026-01-02 13:58:18
- ISC event: 644893809
- USGS-ANSS: ComCat
- Local date: 2 January 2026
- Local time: 07:58:18 Zona Centro (UTC-6)
- Duration: c.33 seconds
- Magnitude: M_{w} 6.5
- Depth: 18.0 km (11.2 mi)
- Epicenter: 16.902°N 99.303°W
- Areas affected: Guerrero, Morelos and Mexico City, Mexico
- Max. intensity: MMI VII (Very strong)
- Tsunami: None
- Aftershocks: 2,144+ recorded Strongest: mb4.9
- Casualties: 2 deaths, 24 injuries

On 2 January 2026, at 07:58:18 local time (13:58:18 UTC), a M_{w} 6.5 earthquake struck near San Marcos in the Mexican state of Guerrero. The earthquake occurred at a depth of 18 kilometres (11 mi). Two people were killed, twenty-four others were injured and hundreds of buildings were damaged as a result of the earthquake.

== Tectonic setting ==
Mexico is one of the most seismically active regions in the world; located at the boundary of at least three tectonic plates. The west coast of Mexico lies at a convergent plate boundary between the Cocos plate and North American plate. The Cocos plate consists of denser oceanic lithosphere, subducts beneath the less dense continental crust of the North American plate. Most of the Mexican landmass is situated on the North American plate moving westward. Because the oceanic crust is relatively dense, when the bottom of the Pacific Ocean meets the lighter continental crust of the Mexican landmass, the ocean floor subducts beneath the North American plate creating the Middle America Trench along the southern coast of Mexico. Occasionally, the contact interface or subduction zone megathrust releases elastic strain during earthquakes. Large and sudden uplift of the seafloor can produce large tsunamis when such earthquakes occur.

== Earthquake ==
The earthquake was strongly felt in Oaxaca and Veracruz, and was also lightly and moderately felt in Puebla, Jalisco, Tabasco, Colima, Hidalgo and Michoacán. By 4 January, 2,144 aftershocks were recorded.

== Impact ==
A 56-year old woman was killed when her house collapsed, 12 people were hospitalized and damage occurred at 23 municipalities in Guerrero, where 5,380 homes were damaged, of which 1,647 were badly damaged or destroyed. In Acapulco, some hotels and Acapulco International Airport suffered damage. At least 29 gas leaks and 24 landslides occurred in the city and in Chilpancingo. Minor damage was also reported at Mexico City International Airport and a hospital. In Mexico City, a 67-year-old man was killed in Benito Juárez after he fell while evacuating his second-floor apartment. Twelve people were injured, five utility poles and four trees were downed and power outages lasting hours occurred in the city. Two structures were assessed for potential collapse, and inspections were underway at 34 buildings and five homes. Additionally, a fault at an electrical substation caused a fire in a building in the city center. Hundreds of people were evacuated, including people at President Claudia Sheinbaum's first press briefing of the year. Houses were also damaged in Morelos.

On 16 January, a new aftershock measuring 4.9 in the Richter scale caused additional damage to homes in San Marcos.

== See also ==
- 1957 Guerrero earthquake
- 1964 Guerrero earthquake
- 1995 Guerrero earthquake
- List of earthquakes in 2026
- List of earthquakes in Mexico
