= 1964 Guerrero earthquake =

Earthquake in Mexico

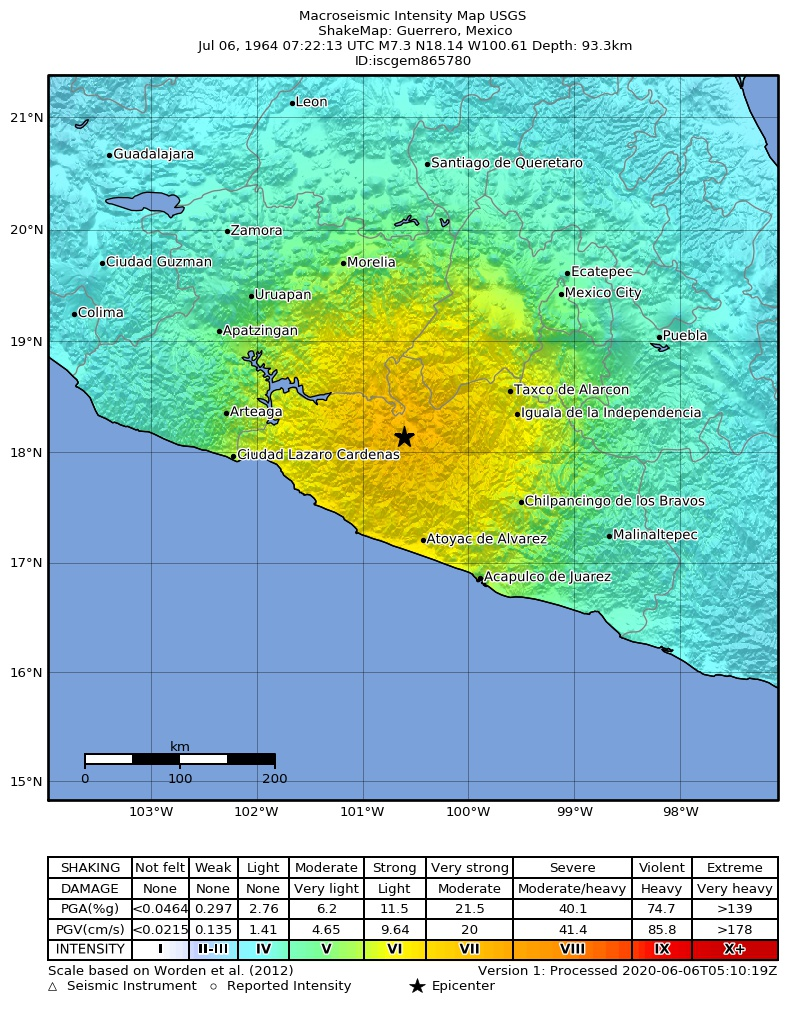
- USGS ShakeMap

- Location within Mexico
- UTC time: 1964-07-06 07:22:13
- ISC event: 865780
- USGS-ANSS: ComCat
- Local date: July 6, 1964
- Local time: 01:22
- Magnitude: 7.2 M_{w}
- Depth: 92 km (57 mi)
- Epicenter: 18.19°N 100.51°W
- Areas affected: Mexico
- Casualties: 40 killed

The 1964 Guerrero earthquake occurred on July 6 at 01:22 local time in Guerrero, Mexico. The magnitude of this earthquake was given as M_{s} 7.4, or M_{L} 7.2.

== Tectonic setting ==
In the nearby region, the Cocos plate is subducting beneath the North American plate, however, this was an intraplate earthquake.

== Earthquake ==
The earthquake affected the states of Guerrero and Michoacán. Forty deaths were reported. The most affected places included Ciudad Altamirano, Cutzamala, Coyuca de Catalán, Tanganhuato, and Huertamo. The earthquake was also felt strongly and caused panic in Mexico City.

== Damage ==
Coyuca de Catalán was seriously damaged. The city hall was destroyed. The majority of the houses there were seriously damaged and became uninhabitable. There were great cracks on the ground.

== See also ==
- 1995 Guerrero earthquake
- 2026 Guerrero earthquake
- List of earthquakes in 1964
- List of earthquakes in Mexico
