= Hakusan Park =

Park in Japan

Coordinates: 37°54′52″N 139°02′21″E

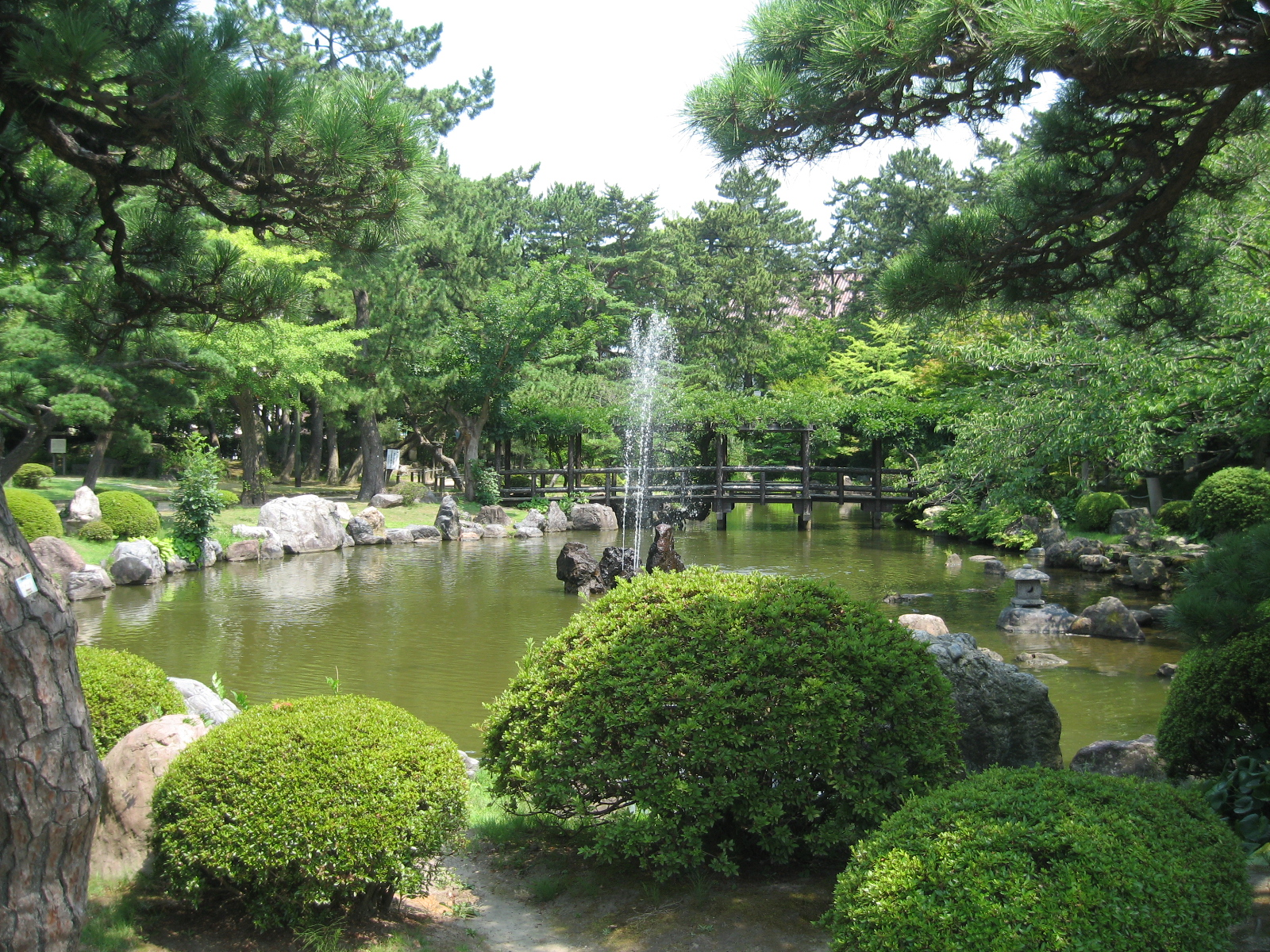

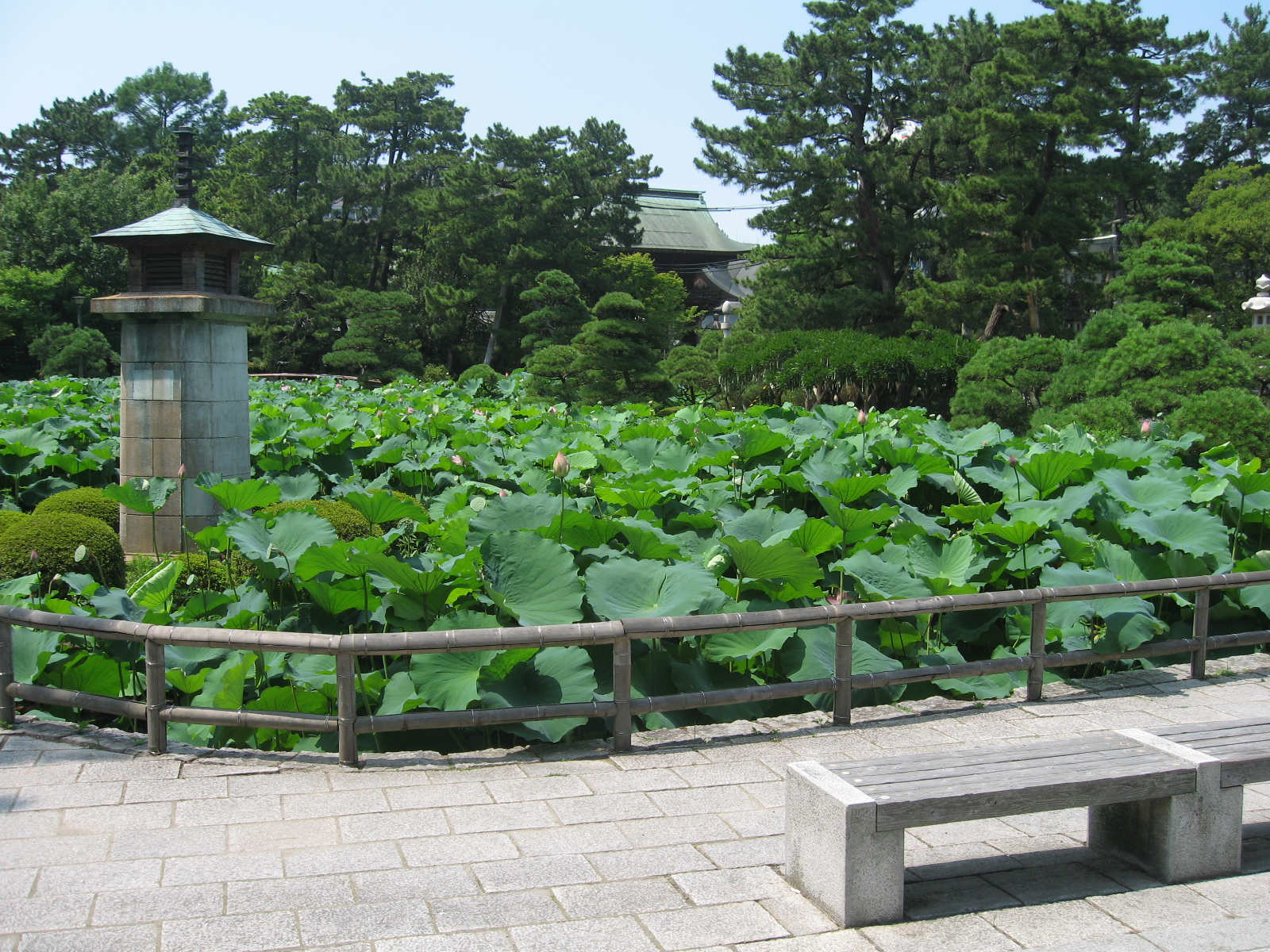

Hakusan Park (白山公園, Hakusan-kōen) is a park in Chūō-ku, Niigata, Niigata Prefecture, Japan.

== History ==
The 1964 Niigata earthquake caused the sandy soil under the city to liquefy, damaging many city facilities. The aging baseball stadium was converted to an earthquake memorial using funds from the earthquake disaster relief money. This is currently the Niigata Prefectural Hall.

From the 1990s, aging facilities were demolished. A riverside picnic site covering approximately 7 hectares was created, and north and south bound traffic was diverted under the park via a tunnel.

== Other facilities in the park ==
- Hakusan Shrine
- Niigata Prefectural Government Memorial Hall
- Niigata City Music and Culture Hall
- Niigata-City Performing Arts Center (Ryutopia)
- Niigata Prefectural Civic Center
- Niigata City Municipal Gymnasium
- Niigata City Athletic Stadium
