= 1995 Guerrero earthquake =

Earthquake in Mexico

- Location within Mexico
- UTC time: 1995-09-14 14:04:31
- ISC event: 84239
- USGS-ANSS: ComCat
- Local date: September 14, 1995
- Local time: 08:04
- Magnitude: 7.4 M_{w}
- Depth: 23 km (14 mi)
- Epicenter: 16.779°N 98.597°W
- Areas affected: Mexico
- Max. intensity: MMI VII (Very strong)
- Casualties: 3 killed

The 1995 Guerrero earthquake occurred on September 14, 1995, at 14:04 UTC (08:04 local time). This earthquake had a magnitude of M_{w} 7.4, with the epicenter being located in the state of Guerrero, Mexico. Three people were reported dead. In the rural part of southeast Guerrero, many houses with adobe of poor quality suffered heavier damage. The intensity in Copala reached MM VII. The earthquake could be felt strongly along the coast from Michoacán to Chiapas.

== Tectonic setting ==
The earthquake occurred in the region of the Middle America Trench. It was an interplate earthquake. It had a reverse faulting focal mechanism.

== See also ==
- 1964 Guerrero earthquake
- 2026 Guerrero earthquake
- List of earthquakes in 1995
- List of earthquakes in Mexico
