= List of earthquakes in 1964 =

Earthquakes in 1964
Approximate epicenters of the earthquakes in 1964
- 4.0–5.9 magnitude
- 6.0–6.9 magnitude
- 7.0–7.9 magnitude
- 8.0+ magnitude
- Strongest: United States, southern Alaska (Magnitude 9.2) March 28
- Deadliest: United States, southern Alaska (Magnitude 9.2) March 28 139 deaths
- Total fatalities: 389

Number by magnitude
- 9.0+: 1

This is a list of earthquakes in 1964. Only magnitude 6.0 or greater earthquakes appear on the list. Lower magnitude events are included if they have caused death, injury or damage. Events which occurred in remote areas will be excluded from the list as they wouldn't have generated significant media interest. All dates are listed according to UTC time. Maximum intensities are indicated on the Mercalli intensity scale and are sourced from United States Geological Survey (USGS) ShakeMap data. Alaska had the largest event of the year both in terms of magnitude and death toll. In March a great magnitude 9.2 earthquake struck the southern part of the state. This was the largest earthquake in United States' history and currently as of 2021 ranks as 3rd largest globally. The quake and subsequent tsunami resulted in 139 deaths in total. In spite of such a large event there were only 11 other magnitude 7.0 + events which is below normal. Japan, Taiwan and Mexico had earthquakes which resulted in a number of deaths. Indonesia and Papua New Guinea experienced high activity this year with a cluster of magnitude 6.0 + events hitting throughout the year.

== Overall ==
=== By death toll ===
| Rank | Death toll | Magnitude | Location | MMI | Depth (km) | Date |
|---|---|---|---|---|---|---|
| 1 | 139 | 9.2 | United States, southern Alaska | XI (Extreme) | 25.0 | March 28 |
| 2 | 107 | 6.5 | Taiwan, Kaohsiung / Baihe | VI (Strong) | 48.1 | January 18 |
| 3 | 78 | 7.3 | Mexico, Guerrero | VII (Very strong) | 93.3 | July 6 |
| 4 | 26 | 7.6 | Japan, off the west coast of Honshu | VIII (Severe) | 15.0 | June 16 |
| 5 | 19 | 6.8 | Turkey, Bursa Province | X (Extreme) | 27.4 | October 6 |

- Note: At least 10 casualties

=== By magnitude ===
| Rank | Magnitude | Death toll | Location | MMI | Depth (km) | Date |
|---|---|---|---|---|---|---|
| 1 | 9.2 | 139 | United States, southern Alaska | XI (Extreme) | 25.0 | March 28 |
| 2 | 7.8 | 0 | United Kingdom, South Sandwich Islands | I (Not felt) | 125.0 | May 26 |
| = 3 | 7.6 | 26 | Japan, off the west coast of Honshu | VIII (Severe) | 15.0 | June 16 |
| = 3 | 7.6 | 0 | New Hebrides, Vanuatu | VII (Very strong) | 130.0 | July 9 |
| = 3 | 7.6 | 0 | New Zealand, south of South Island | I (Not felt) | 20.0 | September 12 |
| 4 | 7.4 | 0 | Indonesia, Minahasa Peninsula, Sulawesi | VII (Very strong) | 130.0 | March 28 |
| 5 | 7.3 | 78 | Mexico, Guerrero | VII (Very strong) | 93.3 | July 6 |
| = 6 | 7.1 | 0 | Soviet Union, southern Kuril Islands, Russia | VIII (Severe) | 71.3 | June 23 |
| = 6 | 7.1 | 0 | India, Nicobar Islands | V (Moderate) | 70.0 | September 15 |
| = 7 | 7.0 | 0 | Indonesia, near Banda Aceh, Sumatra | VII (Very strong) | 60.0 | April 2 |
| = 7 | 7.0 | 0 | Japan, eastern Sea of Japan | V (Moderate) | 20.0 | May 7 |
| = 7 | 7.0 | 0 | Australia, west of Bougainville Island, Papua and New Guinea | IV (Light) | 388.3 | August 13 |

- Note: At least 7.0 magnitude

== Notable events ==
=== January ===
January
- Strongest: 6.9 M_{w} New Hebrides, Vanuatu
- Deadliest: 6.5 M_{w} Taiwan; 107 deaths
- Total fatalities: 115

Number by magnitude
- 8.0–8.9: 0
- 7.0–7.9: 0
- 6.0–6.9: 7
- 5.0–5.9: 1

| Date | Country and location | M_{w} | Depth (km) | MMI | Notes | Casualties | |
| Date | Country and location | M_{w} | Depth (km) | MMI | Notes | Dead | Injured |
|---|---|---|---|---|---|---|---|
| 6 | Soviet Union, Kuril Islands, Russia | 6.2 | 55.0 | V | | | |
| 8 | Indonesia, off the west coast of Sulawesi | 5.2 | 90.0 | | 8 people were killed and 27 were injured. Some damage was caused. | 8 | 27 |
| 10 | Japan, off the south coast of Hokkaido | 6.1 | 55.0 | V | | | |
| 18 | Taiwan, Kaohsiung | 6.5 | 48.1 | VI | 107 people were killed and 479 were injured in the 1964 Baihe earthquake. 3,000 homes were destroyed. | 107 | 479 |
| 20 | New Hebrides, Vanuatu | 6.9 | 137.5 | VI | | | |
| 22 | Burma, Chin State | 6.2 | 70.0 | VI | | | |
| 26 | Peru, Arequipa Region | 6.5 | 117.7 | V | | | |
| 28 | Afghanistan, Badakhshan Province | 6.6 | 195.5 | IV | | | |

=== February ===
February
- Strongest: 6.9 M_{w} United States
- Total fatalities: 0

Number by magnitude
- 8.0–8.9: 0
- 7.0–7.9: 0
- 6.0–6.9: 4
- 5.0–5.9: 1

| Date | Country and location | M_{w} | Depth (km) | MMI | Notes | Casualties | |
| Date | Country and location | M_{w} | Depth (km) | MMI | Notes | Dead | Injured |
|---|---|---|---|---|---|---|---|
| 5 | Japan, off the east coast of Honshu | 6.0 | 45.0 | IV | | | |
| 6 | United States, south of Alaska | 6.9 | 20.0 | V | | | |
| 13 | China, Yunnan Province | 5.4 | 15.0 | VII | Some damage was reported. | | |
| 14 | Australia, East New Britain Province, Papua and New Guinea | 6.3 | 70.0 | VI | | | |
| 27 | Burma, Magway Region | 6.0 | 100.6 | V | | | |

=== March ===
March
- Strongest: 9.2 M_{w} United States
- Deadliest: 9.2 M_{w} United States; 139 deaths
- Total fatalities: 139

Number by magnitude
- 9.0+: 1
- 8.0–8.9: 0
- 7.0–7.9: 1
- 6.0–6.9: 9

| Date | Country and location | M_{w} | Depth (km) | MMI | Notes | Casualties | |
| Date | Country and location | M_{w} | Depth (km) | MMI | Notes | Dead | Injured |
|---|---|---|---|---|---|---|---|
| 15 | Strait of Gibraltar | 6.6 | 25.0 | V | | | |
| 16 | Soviet Union, Kuril Islands, Russia | 6.1 | 142.2 | IV | | | |
| 21 | Indonesia, Banda Sea | 6.8 | 359.1 | | | | |
| 28 | United States, southern Alaska | 9.2 | 25.0 | XI | The 1964 Alaska earthquake was the largest in United States history. The earthquake itself caused 15 deaths and fairly extensive damage to Anchorage, Alaska and surrounding areas. A large tsunami led to 124 further deaths. Total property damage costs were $400 million (1964 rate). To prevent cluttering only aftershocks above magnitude 6.5 will be listed. | 139 | |
| 28 | United States, northeast of Kodiak Island, Alaska | 6.5 | 25.0 | VI | Aftershock. | | |
| 28 | United States, south of Kodiak Island, Alaska | 6.5 | 15.0 | | Aftershock. | | |
| 28 | Indonesia, Minahasa Peninsula, Sulawesi | 7.4 | 130.0 | VII | | | |
| 28 | United States, south of Kodiak Island, Alaska | 6.6 | 25.0 | | Aftershock. | | |
| 28 | United States, south of Kodiak Island, Alaska | 6.5 | 25.0 | | Aftershock. | | |
| 28 | United States, south of the Kenai Peninsula, Alaska | 6.5 | 15.0 | VI | Aftershock. | | |
| 30 | United States, south of Kodiak Island, Alaska | 6.7 | 18.6 | | Aftershock. | | |

=== April ===
April
- Strongest: 7.0 M_{w} Indonesia
- Deadliest: 6.0 M_{w} Yugoslavia, Croatia; 3 deaths
- Total fatalities: 3

Number by magnitude
- 8.0–8.9: 0
- 7.0–7.9: 1
- 6.0–6.9: 7

| Date | Country and location | M_{w} | Depth (km) | MMI | Notes | Casualties | |
| Date | Country and location | M_{w} | Depth (km) | MMI | Notes | Dead | Injured |
|---|---|---|---|---|---|---|---|
| 2 | Indonesia, Banda Aceh, Sumatra | 7.0 | 60.0 | VII | Major damage was caused with many homes being destroyed. | | |
| 3 | Indonesia, northern Sumatra | 6.0 | 65.8 | V | Too far south of previous event to be consider an aftershock. | | |
| 4 | United States, southwest of Kodiak Island, Alaska | 6.8 | 18.4 | | Aftershock. | | |
| 4 | United States, southwest of Kodiak Island, Alaska | 6.5 | 25.0 | | Aftershock. | | |
| 13 | Yugoslavia, 1964 Slavonia earthquake, Croatia | 6.0 | 15.0 | VIII | 3 people were killed and major damage was caused. | 3 | |
| 23 | Indonesia, Aru Islands | 6.4 | 15.0 | VIII | | | |
| 24 | Australia, Madang Province, Papua and New Guinea | 6.8 | 108.0 | VI | | | |
| 26 | Indonesia, Sunda Strait | 6.1 | 20.0 | VI | | | |

=== May ===
May
- Strongest: 7.8 M_{w} United Kingdom
- Deadliest: 6.5 M_{w} Tanzania; 1 death
- Total fatalities: 1

Number by magnitude
- 8.0–8.9: 0
- 7.0–7.9: 2
- 6.0–6.9: 6

| Date | Country and location | M_{w} | Depth (km) | MMI | Notes | Casualties | |
| Date | Country and location | M_{w} | Depth (km) | MMI | Notes | Dead | Injured |
|---|---|---|---|---|---|---|---|
| 6 | United Kingdom, Solomon Islands | 6.0 | 50.0 | V | | | |
| 7 | Tanzania, Manyara Region | 6.5 | 33.8 | VIII | 1 person died and 19 were injured. Major damage was reported. | 1 | 19 |
| 7 | Japan, eastern Sea of Japan | 7.0 | 20.0 | V | 2 homes were destroyed. | | |
| 7 | Japan, eastern Sea of Japan | 6.5 | 25.0 | V | Aftershock. | | |
| 19 | Ecuador, Manabí Province | 6.2 | 35.0 | VI | | | |
| 26 | United Kingdom, South Sandwich Islands | 7.8 | 125.0 | | | | |
| 30 | Japan, off the east coast of Honshu | 6.2 | 45.6 | IV | | | |
| 31 | Soviet Union, Kuril Islands, Russia | 6.7 | 48.6 | VI | | | |

=== June ===
June
- Strongest: 7.6 M_{w} Japan
- Deadliest: 7.6 M_{w} Japan; 26 deaths
- Total fatalities: 34

Number by magnitude
- 8.0–8.9: 0
- 7.0–7.9: 2
- 6.0–6.9: 6
- 5.0–5.9: 1

| Date | Country and location | M_{w} | Depth (km) | MMI | Notes | Casualties | |
| Date | Country and location | M_{w} | Depth (km) | MMI | Notes | Dead | Injured |
|---|---|---|---|---|---|---|---|
| 11 | Indonesia, off the north coast of Papua (province) | 6.0 | 20.0 | V | | | |
| 14 | Turkey, Malatya Province | 5.8 | 10.0 | VIII | 8 people died and some damage was caused. | 8 | |
| 15 | Indonesia, northern Sumatra | 6.2 | 35.0 | VI | | | |
| 16 | Japan, off the west coast of Honshu | 7.6 | 15.0 | VIII | 26 people were killed and 450 were injured in the 1964 Niigata earthquake. Property damage was extensive with costs of $80 million (1964 rate). 2,250 homes were damaged or destroyed. | 26 | 450 |
| 16 | Japan, off the west coast of Honshu | 6.5 | 10.0 | VI | Aftershock. | | |
| 16 | Japan, off the west coast of Honshu | 6.2 | 15.0 | VI | Aftershock. | | |
| 23 | Soviet Union, southern Kuril Islands, Russia | 7.1 | 71.3 | VIII | | | |
| 28 | Australia, St Matthias Islands, Papua and New Guinea | 6.2 | 35.0 | VI | | | |
| 30 | Indonesia, Gulf of Tomini, Sulawesi | 6.6 | 20.0 | VI | | | |

=== July ===
July
- Strongest: 7.6 M_{w} New Hebrides, Vanuatu
- Deadliest: 7.3 M_{w} Mexico; 78 deaths
- Total fatalities: 78

Number by magnitude
- 8.0–8.9: 0
- 7.0–7.9: 2
- 6.0–6.9: 10

| Date | Country and location | M_{w} | Depth (km) | MMI | Notes | Casualties | |
| Date | Country and location | M_{w} | Depth (km) | MMI | Notes | Dead | Injured |
|---|---|---|---|---|---|---|---|
| 5 | Mexico, Gulf of California | 6.3 | 15.0 | V | | | |
| 5 | Soviet Union, Kuril Islands, Russia | 6.5 | 35.0 | | | | |
| 6 | Mexico, Gulf of California | 6.5 | 15.0 | V | | | |
| 6 | Mexico, Guerrero | 7.3 | 93.3 | VII | The 1964 Guerrero earthquake left 78 people dead and caused major damage. | 78 | |
| 8 | Indonesia, Banda Sea | 6.9 | 190.0 | V | | | |
| 9 | Tonga | 6.5 | 20.0 | | | | |
| 9 | New Hebrides, Vanuatu | 7.6 | 130.0 | VII | | | |
| 12 | Japan, off the west coast of Honshu | 6.0 | 12.5 | VI | Aftershock of June event. | | |
| 17 | Greece, Attica (region) | 6.2 | 152.7 | IV | | | |
| 24 | Soviet Union, Kuril Islands, Russia | 6.8 | 30.0 | V | | | |
| 25 | Chile, Atacama Region | 6.5 | 30.0 | VII | | | |
| 31 | Australia, West New Britain Province, Papua and New Guinea | 6.5 | 35.0 | VI | | | |

=== August ===
August
- Strongest: 7.0 M_{w} Australia, Papua and New Guinea
- Total fatalities: 0

Number by magnitude
- 8.0–8.9: 0
- 7.0–7.9: 1
- 6.0–6.9: 2

| Date | Country and location | M_{w} | Depth (km) | MMI | Notes | Casualties | |
| Date | Country and location | M_{w} | Depth (km) | MMI | Notes | Dead | Injured |
|---|---|---|---|---|---|---|---|
| 13 | Australia, west of Bougainville Island, Papua and New Guinea | 7.0 | 388.3 | IV | | | |
| 18 | Chile, off the coast of Atacama Region | 6.7 | 15.0 | V | | | |
| 23 | Australia, West New Britain Province, Papua and New Guinea | 6.2 | 50.0 | V | | | |

=== September ===
September
- Strongest: 7.6 M_{w} New Zealand
- Total fatalities: 0

Number by magnitude
- 8.0–8.9: 0
- 7.0–7.9: 2
- 6.0–6.9: 4

| Date | Country and location | M_{w} | Depth (km) | MMI | Notes | Casualties | |
| Date | Country and location | M_{w} | Depth (km) | MMI | Notes | Dead | Injured |
|---|---|---|---|---|---|---|---|
| 1 | China, Shanxi Province | 4.7 | 0.0 | | 23 homes were destroyed. Unknown depth. | | |
| 4 | Indonesia, Ceram Sea | 6.1 | 35.0 | V | | | |
| 5 | Australia, west of Bougainville Island, Papua and New Guinea | 6.2 | 65.0 | V | | | |
| 12 | Australia, East Sepik Province, Papua and New Guinea | 6.6 | 108.8 | VI | | | |
| 12 | New Zealand, south of South Island | 7.6 | 20.0 | | | | |
| 15 | India, Nicobar Islands | 7.1 | 70.0 | V | | | |
| 29 | Tonga | 6.0 | 20.0 | | | | |

=== October ===
October
- Strongest: 6.9 M_{w}, Indonesia
- Deadliest: 6.8 M_{w}, Turkey; 19 deaths
- Total fatalities: 19

Number by magnitude
- 8.0–8.9: 0
- 7.0–7.9: 0
- 6.0–6.9: 6

| Date | Country and location | M_{w} | Depth (km) | MMI | Notes | Casualties | |
| Date | Country and location | M_{w} | Depth (km) | MMI | Notes | Dead | Injured |
|---|---|---|---|---|---|---|---|
| 2 | United Kingdom, Solomon Islands | 6.1 | 26.5 | V | | | |
| 6 | Turkey, Bursa Province | 6.8 | 27.4 | X | 19 people died and $5 million (1964 rate) in property damage was caused. | 19 | |
| 11 | Indonesia, Gulf of Tomini, Sulawesi | 6.2 | 25.0 | VI | | | |
| 16 | Soviet Union, Kuril Islands, Russia | 6.5 | 26.0 | | | | |
| 18 | Indonesia, Banda Sea | 6.9 | 586.3 | | | | |
| 21 | India, Arunachal Pradesh | 6.8 | 25.0 | VII | | | |

=== November ===
November
- Strongest: 6.8 M_{w} Australia, Papua and New Guinea 2 events
- Total fatalities: 0

Number by magnitude
- 8.0–8.9: 0
- 7.0–7.9: 0
- 6.0–6.9: 10

| Date | Country and location | M_{w} | Depth (km) | MMI | Notes | Casualties | |
| Date | Country and location | M_{w} | Depth (km) | MMI | Notes | Dead | Injured |
|---|---|---|---|---|---|---|---|
| 2 | Peru, Loreto Region | 6.0 | 117.1 | IV | | | |
| 7 | Indonesia, northern Sumatra | 6.1 | 100.0 | V | | | |
| 17 | Australia, East New Britain Province, Papua and New Guinea | 6.8 | 55.0 | VIII | Some damage was caused. Another large event struck a few days later in an example of a doublet earthquake. | | |
| 18 | Australia, off the east coast of mainland Papua and New Guinea | 6.1 | 55.0 | V | | | |
| 18 | Tonga | 6.0 | 10.0 | | | | |
| 19 | Australia, East New Britain Province, Papua and New Guinea | 6.8 | 35.0 | VII | | | |
| 24 | Philippines, east of Luzon | 6.3 | 35.0 | V | | | |
| 25 | Indonesia, Southeast Sulawesi | 6.0 | 617.5 | II | | | |
| 26 | Taiwan, off the northeast coast | 6.2 | 15.0 | VI | | | |
| 27 | Japan, Sado Island | 6.0 | 15.0 | VI | Aftershock of June event. | | |

=== December ===
December
- Strongest: 6.7 M_{w} United Kingdom, Fiji
- Total fatalities: 0

Number by magnitude
- 8.0–8.9: 0
- 7.0–7.9: 0
- 6.0–6.9: 4

| Date | Country and location | M_{w} | Depth (km) | MMI | Notes | Casualties | |
| Date | Country and location | M_{w} | Depth (km) | MMI | Notes | Dead | Injured |
|---|---|---|---|---|---|---|---|
| 7 | Australia, East New Britain Province, Papua and New Guinea | 6.1 | 60.0 | VI | | | |
| 9 | Argentina, Santiago del Estero Province | 6.3 | 582.7 | | | | |
| 10 | Japan, eastern Sea of Japan | 6.3 | 30.0 | V | | | |
| 28 | United Kingdom, south of Fiji | 6.7 | 589.2 | | | | |
