= List of earthquakes in 1940 =

Earthquakes in 1940
Approximate epicenters of the earthquakes in 1940
- 4.0–5.9 magnitude
- 6.0–6.9 magnitude
- 7.0–7.9 magnitude
- 8.0+ magnitude
- Strongest magnitude: Peru, Lima Region (Magnitude 8.2) May 24
- Deadliest: Romania, Vrancea County (Magnitude 7.8) November 10 1,000 deaths
- Total fatalities: 1,448

Number by magnitude
- 9.0+: 0

This is a list of earthquakes in 1940. Only magnitude 6.0 or greater earthquakes appear on the list. Lower magnitude events are included if they have caused death, injury or damage. Events which occurred in remote areas will be excluded from the list as they wouldn't have generated significant media interest. All dates are listed according to UTC time. Overall, with 13 magnitude 7.0+ events worldwide, this was a fairly busy year. The death toll was substantially lower than 1939. The most significant event in terms of lives lost was in Romania in November with 1,000 deaths. Other quakes in China and Peru resulted in significant fatalities.

== Overall ==
=== By death toll ===
Rank	Death toll	Magnitude	Location	MMI	Depth (km)	Date
1	1,000	7.8	Romania, Vrancea County	( )	90.0	November 10
2	181	6.0	China, Yunnan Province	( )	35.0	April 6
3	179	8.2	Peru, Lima Region	( )	45.0	May 24
4	51	6.0	China, Inner Mongolia	( )	35.0	January 19
5	16	6.5	Georgian SSR, Imereti	( )	50.0	May 7
6	10	7.5	Japan, eastern Sea of Japan	( )	15.0	August 1

- Note: At least 10 casualties

=== By magnitude ===
Rank	Magnitude	Death toll	Location	MMI	Depth (km)	Date
1	8.2	179	Peru, Lima Region	( )	45.0	May 24
2	7.8	1,000	Romania, Vrancea County	( )	90.0	November 10
3	7.7	0	United States, Northern Mariana Islands	( )	15.0	December 28
= 4	7.5	0	United States, Northern Mariana Islands	( )	15.0	January 17
= 4	7.5	10	Japan, eastern Sea of Japan	( )	15.0	August 1
5	7.4	0	United States, Rat Islands, Alaska	( )	65.0	July 14
6	7.3	0	China, Heilongjiang Province	( )	575.0	July 10
7	7.2	0	France, southeast of the Loyalty Islands, New Caledonia	( )	180.0	January 6
8	7.1	0	Bolivia, La Paz Department (Bolivia)	( )	220.0	December 22
= 9	7.0	0	New Hebrides	( )	210.0	February 20
= 9	7.0	0	Japan, southern Sea of Japan	( )	10.0	August 13
= 9	7.0	0	Philippines, southeast of Mindanao	( )	15.0	October 7
= 9	7.0	0	Chile, Chiloé Island, Los Lagos Region	( )	35.0	October 11

- Note: At least 7.0 magnitude

== Notable events ==
=== January ===
January
- Strongest magnitude: 7.5 M_{w} United States
- Deadliest: 6.0 M_{w} China; 51+ deaths
- Total fatalities: 51+

Number by magnitude
- 8.0–8.9: 0
- 7.0–7.9: 2
- 6.0–6.9: 2

Date	Country and location	M_{w}	Depth (km)	MMI	Notes	Casualties	
Date	Country and location	M_{w}	Depth (km)	MMI	Notes	Dead	Injured
6	France, southeast of the Loyalty Islands, New Caledonia	7.2	180.0				
17	United States, Northern Mariana Islands	7.5	15.0				
19	China, Inner Mongolia	6.0	35.0		At least 51 people were killed and many homes were destroyed.	51+	
26	Japan, southeast of the Ryukyu Islands	6.6	15.0				

=== February ===
February
- Strongest magnitude: 7.0 M_{w} New Hebrides
- Total fatalities: 0

Number by magnitude
- 8.0–8.9: 0
- 7.0–7.9: 1
- 6.0–6.9: 6

Date	Country and location	M_{w}	Depth (km)	MMI	Notes	Casualties	
Date	Country and location	M_{w}	Depth (km)	MMI	Notes	Dead	Injured
12	Chile, off the coast of Atacama Region	6.5	70.0				
12	Fiji, south of	6.6	220.0				
12	United States, south of the Alaska Peninsula	6.8	0.0	V	Depth unknown.		
20	New Hebrides	7.0	210.0				
24	New Guinea, off the north coast of	6.3	15.0				
27	Venezuela, Delta Amacuro	6.0	35.0				
29	Greece, north of Crete	6.0	35.0				

=== March ===
March
- Strongest magnitude: 6.6 M_{w} Philippines
- Total fatalities: 0

Number by magnitude
- 8.0–8.9: 0
- 7.0–7.9: 0
- 6.0–6.9: 4

Date	Country and location	M_{w}	Depth (km)	MMI	Notes	Casualties	
Date	Country and location	M_{w}	Depth (km)	MMI	Notes	Dead	Injured
9	Japan, Bonin Islands	6.5	500.0				
19	Afghanistan, Nuristan Province	6.0	50.0				
28	Philippines, west of Luzon	6.6	200.9				
31	Chile, off the coast of Arica y Parinacota Region	6.0	50.0				

=== April ===
April
- Strongest magnitude: 6.9 M_{w} United States 2 events
- Deadliest: 6.0 M_{w} China; 181 deaths
- Total fatalities: 181

Number by magnitude
- 8.0–8.9: 0
- 7.0–7.9: 0
- 6.0–6.9: 9

Date	Country and location	M_{w}	Depth (km)	MMI	Notes	Casualties	
Date	Country and location	M_{w}	Depth (km)	MMI	Notes	Dead	Injured
1	Dutch East Indies, Papua (province)	6.6	35.0				
5	Japan, Volcano Islands	6.5	220.0				
6	China, Yunnan Province	6.0	35.0	VIII	181 people died and another 475 were injured. 11,556 homes were destroyed.	181	475
8	Chile, Valparaíso Region	6.0	35.0				
16	United States, Near Islands, Alaska	6.9	30.0	rowspan="2"| Doublet earthquake.			
16	United States, Near Islands, Alaska	6.9	30.0				
20	Japan, Shiga Prefecture, Honshu	6.0	400.0				
27	New Hebrides, Espiritu Santo	6.5	35.0	rowspan="2"| Doublet earthquake.			
27	New Hebrides, Espiritu Santo	6.5	35.0				

=== May ===
May
- Strongest magnitude: 8.2 M_{w} Peru
- Deadliest: 8.2 M_{w} Peru; 179 deaths
- Total fatalities: 204

Number by magnitude
- 8.0–8.9: 1
- 7.0–7.9: 0
- 6.0–6.9: 13

Date	Country and location	M_{w}	Depth (km)	MMI	Notes	Casualties	
Date	Country and location	M_{w}	Depth (km)	MMI	Notes	Dead	Injured
1	Argentina, Chaco Province	6.2	580.0				
4	Iran, Razavi Khorasan province	6.3	15.0				
5	Peru, off the coast of northern	6.0	35.0				
7	Georgian SSR, Imereti	6.5	50.0		16 deaths were caused and some damage was reported.	16	
11	British Burma, Sagaing Region	6.5	80.0				
19	United States, southern California	6.9	6.0	X	9 people died in the 1940 El Centro earthquake. Major damage was caused in the area. Costs were $33 million (1940 rate).	9	
19	Russian SFSR, Sea of Okhotsk	6.6	575.0				
19	Portuguese Mozambique, Gaza Province	6.2	35.0				
21	Fiji	6.5	350.0				
24	Peru, Lima Region	8.2	45.0	X	1940 Lima earthquake: 179 people were killed and 3,500 were injured. Many homes were destroyed.	179	3,500
24	Peru, Lima Region	6.6	45.0		Aftershock.		
27	Afghanistan, Badakhshan Province	6.2	240.0				
28	Dutch East Indies, Papua (province)	6.6	35.0				
29	Canada, Northwest Territories	6.2	35.0				

=== June ===
June
- Strongest magnitude: 6.6 M_{w} Dutch East Indies
- Deadliest: 5.5 M_{w} China; 2 deaths
- Total fatalities: 2

Number by magnitude
- 8.0–8.9: 0
- 7.0–7.9: 0
- 6.0–6.9: 8
- 5.0–5.9: 1

Date	Country and location	M_{w}	Depth (km)	MMI	Notes	Casualties	
Date	Country and location	M_{w}	Depth (km)	MMI	Notes	Dead	Injured
3	Mexico, Gulf of California	6.2	35.0				
5	Canada, Northwest Territories	6.5	10.0				
7	New Guinea, D'Entrecasteaux Islands	6.2	35.0				
11	Dutch East Indies, Banda Sea	6.2	35.0				
12	Japan, southeast of Honshu	6.5	100.0				
17	United States, northeast of Hawaii	6.0	0.0	V	Depth unknown.		
18	Philippines, Moro Gulf	6.5	570.0				
19	China, Yunnan Province	5.5	0.0	VII	2 deaths and 20 injuries were caused. Many homes were destroyed.	2	20
22	Dutch East Indies, Gulf of Tomini	6.6	170.0				

=== July ===
July
- Strongest magnitude: 7.4 M_{w} United States
- Total fatalities: 0

Number by magnitude
- 8.0–8.9: 0
- 7.0–7.9: 2
- 6.0–6.9: 4

Date	Country and location	M_{w}	Depth (km)	MMI	Notes	Casualties	
Date	Country and location	M_{w}	Depth (km)	MMI	Notes	Dead	Injured
6	Saint Vincent and the Grenadines	6.5	160.0				
10	China, Heilongjiang Province	7.3	575.0				
14	United States, Rat Islands, Alaska	7.4	65.0				
21	Dutch East Indies, Celebes Sea	6.3	15.0				
27	Guatemala, Escuintla Department	6.5	35.0				
30	Turkey, Yozgat Province	6.2	35.0				

=== August ===
August
- Strongest magnitude: 7.5 M_{w} Japan
- Deadliest: 7.5 M_{w} Japan; 10 deaths
- Total fatalities: 10

Number by magnitude
- 8.0–8.9: 0
- 7.0–7.9: 2
- 6.0–6.9: 4
- 5.0–5.9: 1

Date	Country and location	M_{w}	Depth (km)	MMI	Notes	Casualties	
Date	Country and location	M_{w}	Depth (km)	MMI	Notes	Dead	Injured
1	Fiji, south of	6.6	500.0				
1	Japan, eastern Sea of Japan	7.5	15.0	IX	A tsunami was triggered by the 1940 Shakotan earthquake resulting in 10 deaths due to drowning. 20 homes were destroyed. The earthquake caused some damage.	10	
5	China, Liaoning Province	5.8	0.0	VIII	1,190 homes were destroyed.		
7	Chile, Antofagasta Region	6.2	110.0				
13	Japan, southern Sea of Japan	7.0	15.0				
22	United States, Fox Islands (Alaska)	6.9	15.0	V			
26	Peru, Junín Region	6.0	110.0				

=== September ===
September
- Strongest magnitude: 6.8 M_{w} Philippines
- Total fatalities: 0

Number by magnitude
- 8.0–8.9: 0
- 7.0–7.9: 0
- 6.0–6.9: 10

Date	Country and location	M_{w}	Depth (km)	MMI	Notes	Casualties	
Date	Country and location	M_{w}	Depth (km)	MMI	Notes	Dead	Injured
12	Dutch East Indies, Celebes Sea	6.5	160.0				
12	New Guinea, southeast New Ireland (island)	6.6	75.5				
18	Chile, Antofagasta Region	6.5	110.0				
19	Free France, Loyalty Islands, New Caledonia	6.5	15.0				
21	Afghanistan, Badakhshan Province	6.2	250.0				
22	Philippines, Mindanao	6.8	640.0				
23	Argentina, Salta Province	6.5	550.0				
24	Brazil, Acre (state)	6.0	600.0				
26	British Solomon Islands, Santa Cruz Islands	6.6	135.0				
29	Argentina, Mendoza Province	6.2	110.0				

=== October ===
October
- Strongest magnitude: 7.0 M_{w} 2 events
- Total fatalities: 0

Number by magnitude
- 8.0–8.9: 0
- 7.0–7.9: 2
- 6.0–6.9: 11

Date	Country and location	M_{w}	Depth (km)	MMI	Notes	Casualties	
Date	Country and location	M_{w}	Depth (km)	MMI	Notes	Dead	Injured
1	Chile, Atacama Region	6.5	45.0				
3	Chile, Tarapacá Region	6.2	110.0		Foreshock.		
4	China, Xizang Province	6.0	35.0				
4	Chile, off the coast of Tarapacá Region	6.9	35.0	VII			
5	Costa Rica, Puntarenas Province	6.2	35.0				
6	Chile, off the coast of Tarapacá Region	6.4	15.0		Aftershock.		
7	Philippines, southeast of Mindanao	7.0	15.0				
11	United States, Kenai Peninsula, Alaska	6.0	0.0	IV			
11	Chile, Chiloé Island, Los Lagos Region	7.0	35.0	VII			
22	Romania, Vrancea County	6.5	150.0				
23	Ecuador, Pastaza Province	6.0	140.0				
24	Chile, O'Higgins Region	6.6	45.0				
27	Costa Rica, Puntarenas Province	6.6	35.0				

=== November ===
November
- Strongest magnitude: 7.8 M_{w} Romania
- Deadliest: 7.8 M_{w} Romania; 1,000 deaths
- Total fatalities: 1,000

Number by magnitude
- 8.0–8.9: 0
- 7.0–7.9: 1
- 6.0–6.9: 3

Date	Country and location	M_{w}	Depth (km)	MMI	Notes	Casualties	
Date	Country and location	M_{w}	Depth (km)	MMI	Notes	Dead	Injured
7	Japan, south of Honshu	6.6	440.0				
10	Romania, Vrancea County	7.8	90.0	X	The 1940 Vrancea earthquake caused 1,000 deaths despite being at an intermediate depth. Extensive property damage was caused with costs reaching $10 million (1940 rate).	1,000	
19	Japan, off the east coast of Honshu	6.7	44.2				
22	Russian SFSR, Primorsky Krai	6.0	570.0				

=== December ===
December
- Strongest magnitude: 7.7 M_{w} United States
- Total fatalities: 0

Number by magnitude
- 8.0–8.9: 0
- 7.0–7.9: 2
- 6.0–6.9: 5

Date	Country and location	M_{w}	Depth (km)	MMI	Notes	Casualties	
Date	Country and location	M_{w}	Depth (km)	MMI	Notes	Dead	Injured
4	Dutch East Indies, off the east coast of Seram	6.3	35.0				
7	Mexico, Baja California	6.1	6.0				
17	Dutch East Indies, Papua (province)	6.5	35.0				
18	Northern Rhodesia, Eastern Province, Northern Rhodesia	6.0	35.0				
18	Dutch East Indies, Banda Sea	6.5	150.0				
22	Bolivia, La Paz Department (Bolivia)	7.1	220.0				
28	United States, Northern Mariana Islands	7.7	15.0				
