= 1983 Biga earthquake =

Earthquake in Turkey

- Location within Marmara
- UTC time: 1983-07-05 12:01:30
- ISC event: 571502
- USGS-ANSS: ComCat
- Local date: 5 July 1983
- Local time: 15:01:30 EEST
- Magnitude: 6.1 M_{s}
- Depth: 10 km (6.2 mi)
- Epicenter: 40.324°N 27.222°E
- Type: Strike-slip
- Areas affected: Turkey; Biga
- Max. intensity: MMI IX (Violent)
- Landslides: Yes
- Casualties: 5 dead, 30 injured

The 1983 Biga earthquake hit northwestern Turkey on 5 July 1983. It measured 6.1 on the surface-wave magnitude scale and was felt as far away as eastern Greece. The United States Geological Survey listed the earthquake among the "Significant Earthquakes of the World" for 1983.

== Geology ==
The Biga Peninsula is an area marked by active faults including strike-slip movement and en echelon divergent basins.

The earthquake was preceded by a foreshock nearly a year prior, and was followed by aftershock clusters.

== Damage ==
Five people died and 30 were injured. Several houses collapsed, an additional 85 damaged, water mains broke and windows shattered. Among the dead was a farmer who was crushed by a collapsing roof. It also caused panic as far away as Istanbul and in eastern Greece. In Istanbul, there was some damage and people fled onto the streets.

== See also ==
- List of earthquakes in 1983
- List of earthquakes in Turkey
