= 1940 Lima earthquake =

Earthquake in Peru

- Location within Peru
- UTC time: 1940-05-24 16:33:59
- ISC event: 901374
- USGS-ANSS: ComCat
- Local date: 24 May 1940
- Local time: 11:35 a.m.
- Duration: ~1 minute
- Magnitude: 8.2 M_{w}
- Depth: 45 km (28 mi)
- Epicenter: 11.094°S 77.487°W
- Fault: Peru-Chile Megathrust
- Type: Megathrust
- Areas affected: Peru
- Max. intensity: MMI VIII (Severe)
- Tsunami: 2 m (6 ft 7 in)
- Landslides: Yes
- Aftershocks: M_{w} 6.6
- Casualties: 179–300 dead 3,500 injured

The 1940 Lima earthquake occurred on May 24 at 11:35 a.m. PST with a magnitude of M_{w}8.2 on the moment magnitude scale. Shaking from this powerful earthquake was felt throughout the country, and in Ecuador and Chile. An estimated 179 to 300 people died while 3,500 left injured by the earthquake. The earthquake was centered near the coastal cities of Huacho and Huaura, about 150 km (93 mi) north of the Peruvian capital, Lima. There was a tsunami of up to 2 m (6 ft 7 in) that did not cause damage.

== Earthquake ==
The earthquake was a megathrust event, caused by a sudden slippage along a section of fault under the Peru–Chile Trench. Here, the Nazca plate subducts beneath the South American plate at a rate of 10 cm (3.9 in)/yr, this process could be seen throughout the entire west coast of South America. The interface where both plates make contact occasionally produce moderate to great earthquakes. During the May 1940 earthquake, it is thought that a 162 km (101 mi) × 71 km (44 mi) segment of the megathrust ruptured, with an average displacement of 2.7 m (8 ft 10 in). A maximum uplift of 1.27 m (4 ft 2 in), and subsidence of 0.6 m (2 ft 0 in) was estimated. The rupture area is wedged between that of the 1966 and 1974 earthquake.

== Damage ==
In Lima, the devastation was great, 32 people were killed in this city alone, while in Callao, the death toll was at 58. The Lima Cathedral was badly damaged, together with several thousand buildings. At Bellavista, there were 11 deaths, ten of them were children when the school they were in collapsed, and in San Miguel, two people died. Damage from the earthquake was estimated at 3.6 million Peruvian sols. The shaking was assigned a maximum Modified Mercalli intensity of VIII (Severe). It was also felt in Guayaquil, Eduador and Arica, Chile.

The destruction in Lima, Callao, Chorrillos, Barranco, Chancay and Lurín were also worsened by their poor condition and age. Some modern buildings also had damage which were attributed to the soil type they were constructed on. The Port of Callao, situated on water-logged sandy terrain was heavily damaged. Structures built on alluvial and river deposits were also affected. In Chancay, damage was comparable to Lima; two churches toppled and some dilapidated quincha buildings suffered from collapsed walls.

== See also ==
- List of earthquakes in Peru
- List of earthquakes in 1940
