= Niigata Prefectural Civic Center =

Multi-purpose cultural facility in Chūō-ku, Niigata, Japan

Coordinates: 37°54′48.2″N 139°2′20.3″E

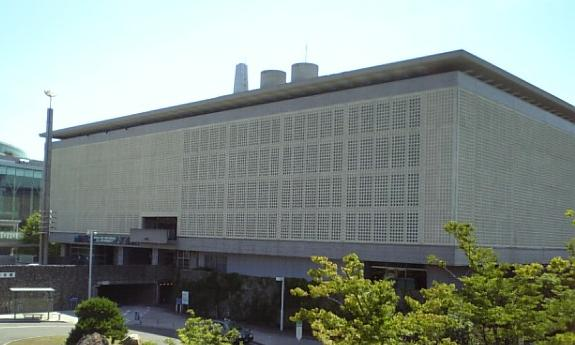
- Niigata Prefectural Civic Center, August 2007
- Interactive map of Niigata Prefectural Civic Center
- Address: 3-13 Ichibanboridōri-chō, Chūō-ku, Niigata 951-8132
- Location: Japan
- Capacity: 1,730 + 300

Construction
- Opened: 21 November 1967
- Cost: 923 million yen

Website
- www.niigata-kenminkaikan.jp

The Niigata Prefectural Civic Center (新潟県民会館, Niigata Kenminkaikan) is a large multi-purpose public cultural facility in Chūō-ku, Niigata, Japan, which opened on 1 December 1967.

== Facilities ==
The main concert hall seats 1,730, and the smaller hall seats 300.

== History ==
Construction of the building started on 20 September 1966. The total construction cost was 923 million yen, and was partially funded using relief donations following the June 1964 Niigata earthquake. The building opened on 21 November 1967.

== Performances ==
Musical artists and groups that have appeared on stage at the Niigata Prefectural Civic Center include the following.

- Iron Maiden december 10 1982.
- A-ha, World tour 1986 – 1987, 11 July 1987
- Mark Morris Dance Group, Japan Tour with Yo-Yo Ma, 7 June 2002
- Dir En Grey, Tour 05: It Withers and Withers, 10 April 2005
- Kodo, One Earth Tour 2011, 21 December 2011
- Every Little Thing, 15th Anniversary Concert Tour 2011-2012 "Ordinary", 3 April 2012
- Blast!, 20 July 2012
- Hideaki Tokunaga, Concert Tour 2012, 28 October 2012
- Chage and Aska, Aska Concert Tour 2012-2013, 15 February 2013

== Access ==
The complex is located within Hakusan Park, and the nearest station to the Niigata Prefectural Civic Center is Hakusan Station on the JR Echigo Line, 15 minutes' walk away. It is 15 minutes by car or bus from the main Niigata Station.
