= 1983 Sea of Japan earthquake =

1983 earthquake and tsunami centered off the coast of Akita Prefecture, Japan

- 日本海中部地震
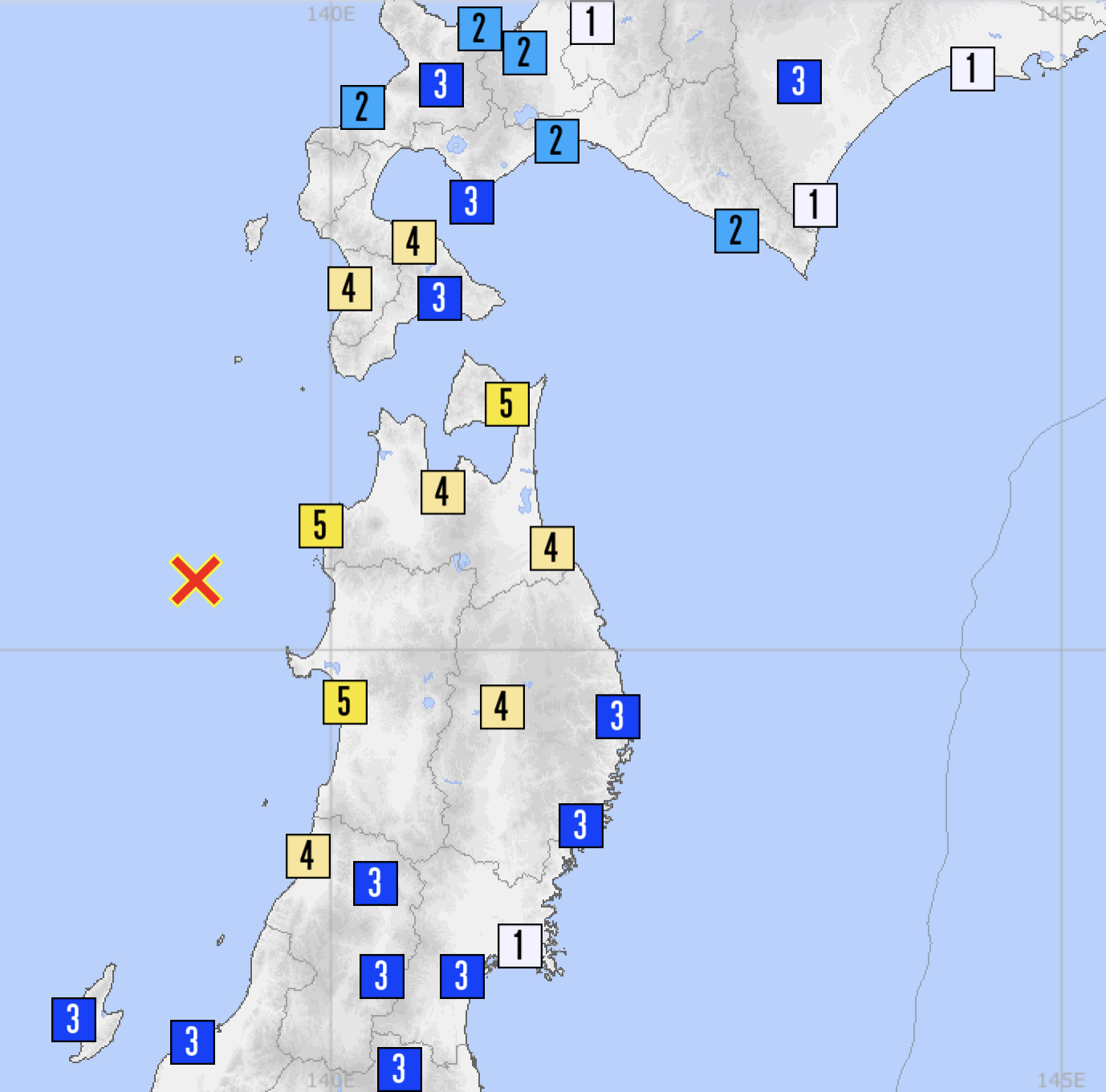
- Felt intensities on the JMA scale, X marks epicenter
- UTC time: 1983-05-26 02:59:59
- ISC event: 577008
- USGS-ANSS: ComCat
- Local date: May 26, 1983
- Local time: 11:59:57
- Duration: 60 seconds
- Magnitude: 7.8 M_{w}
- Depth: 24 km (15 mi)
- Epicenter: 40.462°N 139.102°E
- Areas affected: Japan (Aomori Prefecture, Akita Prefecture)
- Max. intensity: MMI VIII (Severe) JMA 5+
- Tsunami: yes
- Casualties: 104 dead, 324 injured

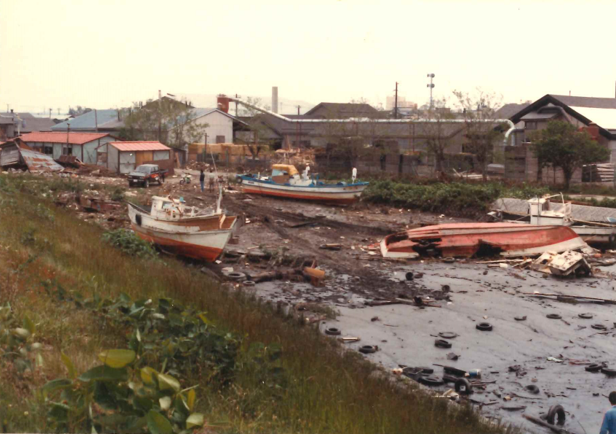
Boat damage from the tsunami, taken one day after the event

The 1983 Sea of Japan earthquake (Japanese: 日本海中部地震) occurred on May 26, 1983, at 11:59:57 local time (02:59:57 UTC). It had a magnitude of 7.8 on the moment magnitude scale. It occurred in the Sea of Japan, about 100 km west of the coast of Noshiro in Akita Prefecture, Japan. Out of the 104 fatalities, all but four were killed by the resulting tsunami, which struck communities along the coast, especially Aomori and Akita Prefectures and the east coast of Noto Peninsula. Images of the tsunami hitting the fishing harbor of Wajima on Noto Peninsula were broadcast on TV. The waves exceeded 10 meters (33 ft) in some areas. Three of the fatalities were along the east coast of South Korea (whether North Korea was affected is not known). The tsunami also hit Okushiri Island, the site of a deadlier tsunami 10 years later.

== Tectonic setting ==
The northwestern side of Honshu lies on the southeastern margin of the Sea of Japan, an area of oceanic crust created by back-arc spreading from the late Oligocene to middle Miocene. The extensional tectonics associated with the spreading formed a series of N–S trending extensional faults and associated basins. Currently the area is being deformed by contractional tectonics, causing inversion of these earlier basins, forming anticlinal structures. It has been suggested that the northwestern coast of Honshu represents an incipient subduction zone, but there remain significant uncertainties about the existence of the Okhotsk microplate and the nature and precise location of its boundary in the Sea of Japan, if it does exist.

== Earthquake ==
The earthquake lasted for about 60 seconds. The focal mechanism indicates reverse faulting and the distribution of aftershocks is consistent with movement on a thrust plane dipping at 30° to the east. The rupture involved two separate faults, the more northerly of which trends NNW-SSE and the more southerly SSW-NNE. The rupture began on the southern fault before continuing on the northern fault after a delay of ten seconds. The maximum perceived intensity was V on the JMA scale (VIII on the Mercalli intensity scale).

== Tsunami ==
The first wave of the tsunami struck the coast about 12 minutes after the earthquake, with a maximum run-up height of 14.9 m (49 ft) recorded on the Oga Peninsula. The initial models of the earthquake were unable to reproduce the short time interval between the shock and the first wave arrival at the coast. The possibility that the faults dipped to the west, which would have brought the tsunami source closer to the coast, was inconsistent with seismic data and slow aseismic slip on the southern fault immediately before the mainshock has been proposed as an explanation.

Tsunami deposits associated with this earthquake have been recognised onshore, on the coast and in the Sea of Japan. Offshore both mass failure deposits and turbidites have been observed that are dated to later than 1954 from high caesium-137 levels in the overlying sediments.

== Damage ==
Much of the earthquake damage was due to soil liquefaction, causing the collapse of houses and a number of road and rail accidents. The degree of liquefaction was the worst seen in Japan since the 1964 Niigata earthquake. The greatest effects were observed in areas underlain by loose Holocene aeolian and fluvial sands. Four people were killed by the effects of the earthquake shaking.

Tsunami warnings were issued 14 minutes after the earthquake, but many parts of the nearby coast were struck before any action could be taken. Many people were struck by the first wave either on the shoreline or on offshore building sites and there were a hundred deaths. The tsunami caused widespread damage to coastal defences, which had been designed for storms rather than tsunamis. The tsunami reached the coast of South Korea about 1–1½ hours after the earthquake, causing the death of three people.

== See also ==
- List of earthquakes in 1983
- List of earthquakes in Japan
