= 1983 Chagos Archipelago earthquake =

- Location within Indian Ocean
- UTC time: 1983-11-30 17:46:00
- ISC event: 565767
- USGS-ANSS: ComCat
- Local date: November 30, 1983
- Local time: 23:46
- Magnitude: 7.7 M_{w} 7.7 M_{s}
- Depth: 10 km (6.2 mi)
- Epicenter: 6.85°S 72.11°E
- Max. intensity: MMI VI (Strong)

The 1983 Chagos Archipelago earthquake occurred on November 30 at 17:46 UTC (23:46 local time) in the region of the Chagos Archipelago, British Indian Ocean Territory. This earthquake had a moment magnitude and surface-wave magnitude of 7.7. This earthquake occurred in the Indian plate near the Central Indian Ridge. The Central Indian Ridge is unusually active in near-ridge earthquakes. The intense seismic activity in this region may indicate an early stage of converging plate boundary, which is responsible for the N–S extension near Chagos. There was a 40 cm tsunami reported in Victoria, Seychelles.
