= Geology of Guinea =

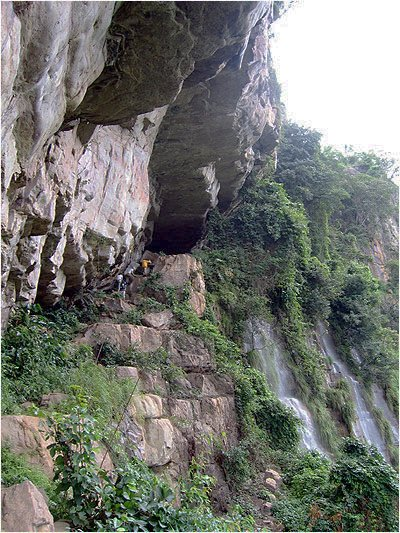
Fouta Djalon Canyon

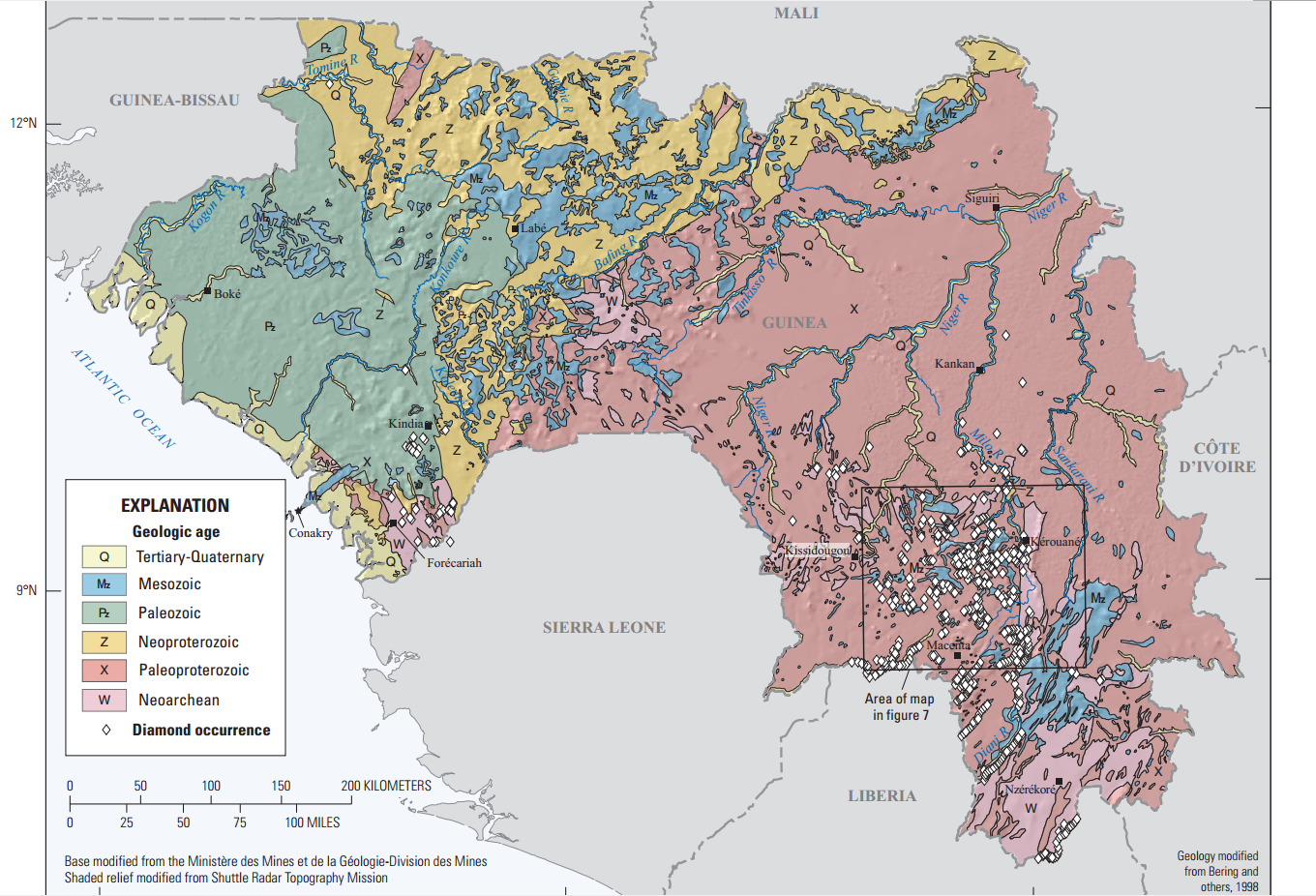
Geological map of Guinea

Geologically, Guinea is covered by a crust of a very large Archean West African Craton with its northern and western regions having formations of younger Proterozoic rocks and its eastern region consists greenstone belts under the Birimian Supergroup which account for a major portion of West Africa's gold and iron ore reserves. Weathering of paleozoïcs schists has resulted in laterisiation leading to the formation of very large bauxite deposits.

The geological formation of Guinean-Liberian belt is Precambrian and Paleozoic rocks. Large bauxite laterite deposits in Silurian shale and Ordovician sandstone have been sourced in the Tertiary by the dolerites; these are discovered in the Fouta Djalan mountain. In the northeastern part of the country, gold has been registered in Birimian. In the crystalline area of the north and south east of the country the prime mineral is iron ore which has itabirites.
