= 1964 Niigata earthquake =

June 1964 earthquake in Japan

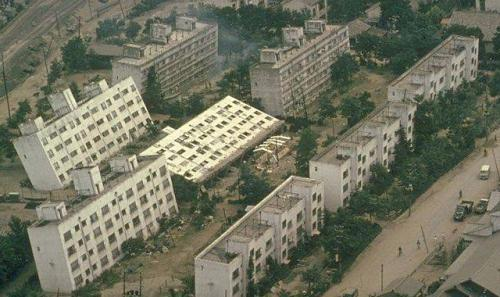
- Effects of soil liquefaction caused by the earthquake on apartment buildings in Niigata

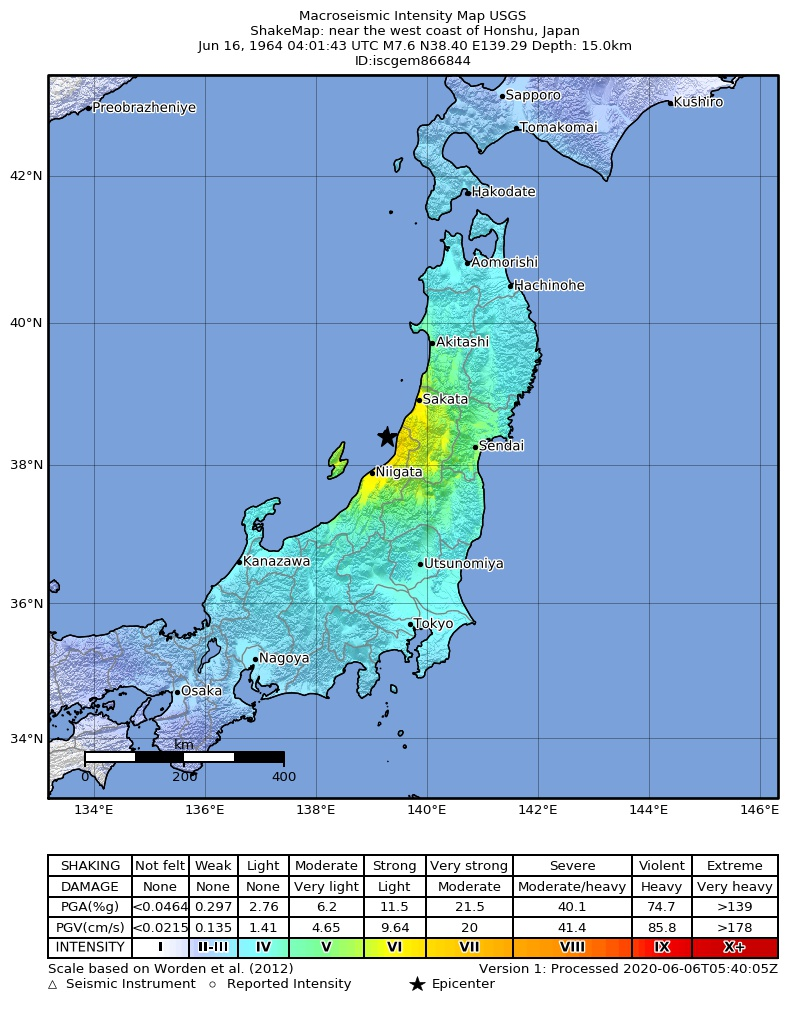
- USGS ShakeMap

- Location within Niigata Prefecture
- UTC time: 1964-06-16 04:01:43
- ISC event: 866844
- USGS-ANSS: ComCat
- Local date: 16 June 1964
- Local time: 13:01:43
- Magnitude: 7.6 M_{w}
- Depth: 34 km (21 mi)
- Epicenter: 38.37°N 139.22°E
- Type: Dip-slip
- Areas affected: Japan, Niigata Prefecture
- Max. intensity: MMI VIII (Severe)
- Tsunami: yes
- Casualties: 36 dead or missing (385 injured)

The 1964 Niigata earthquake (Japanese: 新潟地震) struck at 13:01 local time (04:01 UTC) on 16 June 1964 with a magnitude of 7.6. The epicenter was on the continental shelf off the northwest coast of Honshu, Japan, in Niigata Prefecture, about 50 kilometres (31 mi) north of the city of Niigata. The earthquake caused liquefaction over large parts of the city.

== Geology ==
The northwestern side of Honshu lies on the southeastern margin of the Sea of Japan, an area of oceanic crust created by back-arc spreading from the late Oligocene to middle Miocene. The extensional tectonics associated with the spreading formed a series of N–S trending extensional faults and associated basins. Currently the area is being deformed by contractional tectonics, causing inversion of these earlier basins, forming anticlinal structures. The earthquake is thought to have occurred due to reverse movement on one of these reactivated faults.

== Damage ==
There were 3,534 houses destroyed and a further 11,000 were damaged. This level of damage is explained by the influence of poor sub-soil conditions. Most of the lower part of the city of Niigata is built on recent deltaic deposits from the Shinano and Agano rivers, mainly consisting of unconsolidated sand. Shaking during the earthquake caused liquefaction with instantaneous compaction and formation of many sand volcanoes. Maps of areas of subsidence and sand volcanoes were found to match closely with old maps of the position of former river channels. Subsidence of up to 140 cm was measured over wide areas associated with the liquefaction. In one area of apartment buildings built on reclaimed land by the Shinano River, most of the apartment blocks became inclined and one of them was completely overturned. This was despite relatively low levels of ground acceleration recorded by strong motion accelerographs placed in one of these buildings.

=== Fire and liquefaction ===
Niigata City, which had just recovered from the Great Niigata Fire of 1955, sustained considerable damage from fire and liquefaction that resulted from the earthquake. Aside from the buildings destroyed by liquefaction on the left bank of the Shinano River, there was also extensive damage on the right bank. The runway of the Niigata Airport, which was near the hypocenter, was flooded due to liquefaction and the tsunami; and a fire broke out inside the airport. Most devastatingly, the pipes of a gasoline tank owned by Showa Shell Sekiyu, located between the airport and the harbor, were also damaged by the shaking. Gasoline from the tank was brought to the sea surface by the tsunami and underground water released by the liquefaction, and ignited five hours after the earthquake. The fire spread to nearby tanks and induced explosions that fed the fire, allowing it to continue for 12 days. The fire spread to nearby residential areas, leaving 1407 people displaced. This fire is said to be the worst industrial complex fire in the country's history. At the time the cause of the fire was said to be caused by the liquefaction, but later research into large earthquakes revealed that long period ground motion also played a role.

At the time of the fire, the new specially designed fire truck for fighting chemical fires had not yet been deployed to Niigata City. A request was sent to the Fire and Disaster Management Agency and troops were dispatched from the Tokyo division. There was a danger of the fire spreading to an attached oxygen tank, but the troops from Tokyo managed to stop it from spreading to the tank, after a 20-hour battle.

=== Showa bridge ===
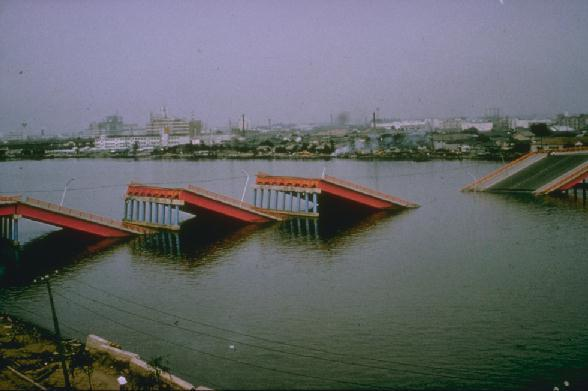
Collapse of the Showa bridge, Niigata caused by the earthquake

The collapse of the Showa bridge in Niigata has been analysed in detail. From eyewitness reports it appears that failure began 70 seconds after the start of the earthquake, suggesting that ground motion was not responsible. Movement of piles beneath the bridge piers, due to lateral spreading caused by liquefaction, is regarded as the main cause of the failure.

== Characteristics ==
=== Earthquake ===
The earthquake had a magnitude of 7.6 on the moment magnitude scale, but the relatively deep focal depth of 34 km meant that the perceived intensities on the coast of Honshu were generally VIII (Severe) or less on the Mercalli intensity scale, on consolidated ground. The calculated focal mechanism indicates reverse faulting on a west-dipping fault trending N20°E. The rupture area was similar to the 1833 Shōnai earthquake, and partially overlapped it.

=== Tsunami ===
The first wave of the tsunami hit Niigata City approximately 15 minutes after the earthquake. It caused flooding damage on Sado Island, Awa Island, and as far away as the Oki Islands in Shimane Prefecture. The wave reached heights of 3 m at Ryōtsu Harbor, 4 m at Shiotani and near Iwafune Harbor, and between 1 and 2 m at Naoetsu. It was also reported that due to the run-up that occurs on sandy beaches, the wave reached 6 m in some places. The first wave was the highest in many places, but the third was reportedly higher in others. The ensuing waves came at intervals of 20 and 50 minutes. Flooding caused by the tsunami persisted in some areas for up to a month.

== Consequences ==
Due to urbanization and modernization in Niigata City and the surrounding area, water pumping quickly increased in 1950, in order to extract water-soluble natural gas in the groundwater. As a result, land subsidence became a serious problem. Since 1959, due to restrictions on the extractions of natural gas and groundwater in the Niigata city area, large-scale land subsidence has lessened. However, in that period the ground was observed to settle an average of 20 cm per year. This land subsidence, the liquefaction in the inner city, and the tsunami all contributed to the massive inundation damage during the earthquake.

The Bandai Bridge, one of the commuter bridges spanning the Shinano River in the city, survived the earthquake intact, but not unscathed. The streets that cross under the bridge on each side and run parallel to the river are approximately 1 meter different in elevation. The bridge itself only sank about 10 cm during the earthquake, but coupled with the aforementioned land subsidence it has sunk a total of 1.2 meters.

== See also ==
- 2004 Chūetsu earthquake
- List of earthquakes in 1964
- List of earthquakes in Japan
