= Echigo-Hirota Station =

Railway station in Kashiwazaki, Japan

Echigo-Hirota Station 越後広田駅
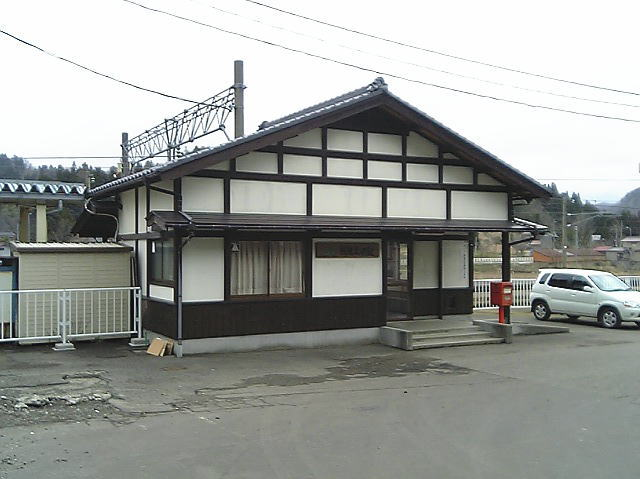
- Echigo-Hirota Station, April 2006

General information
- Location: Kyu-Hirota, Kashiwazaki-shi, Niigata-ken 949-372; Japan
- Coordinates: 37.3574°N 138.6613°E
- Operator: JR East
- Line: ■ Shin'etsu Main Line
- Distance: 48.1 km to Naoetsu
- Platforms: 2 side platforms

Other information
- Status: Unstaffed
- Website: Official website

History
- Opened: 27 December 1921; 104 years ago

Services
Preceding station	JR East	Following station
Kitajō towards Naoetsu	Shin'etsu Main Line Local	Nagatori towards Niigata
Location
- Location within JR Shinetsu Main Line Location within Japan

Echigo-Hirota Station (越後広田駅, Echigo-Hirota-eki) is a railway station in the city of Kashiwazaki, Niigata, Japan, operated by the East Japan Railway Company (JR East).

== Lines ==
Echigo-Hirota Station is served by the Shin'etsu Main Line and is 48.1 kilometers from the terminus of the line at Naoetsu.

== Station layout ==
The station consists of two ground-level opposed side platforms connected by a footbridge, serving two tracks. The station is unattended.

=== Platforms ===
1	■ Shin'etsu Main Line	for Kashiwazaki and Naoetsu
2	■ Shin'etsu Main Line	for Nagaoka and Niigata

== History ==
Echigo-Hirota Station opened on 27 December 1921. With the privatization of Japanese National Railways (JNR) on 1 April 1987, the station came under the control of JR East.

== Surrounding area ==
- Hirota hot springs

== See also ==
- List of railway stations in Japan
