= Kitajō Station =

Railway station in Kashiwazaki, Niigata Prefecture, Japan

Kitajō Station 北条駅
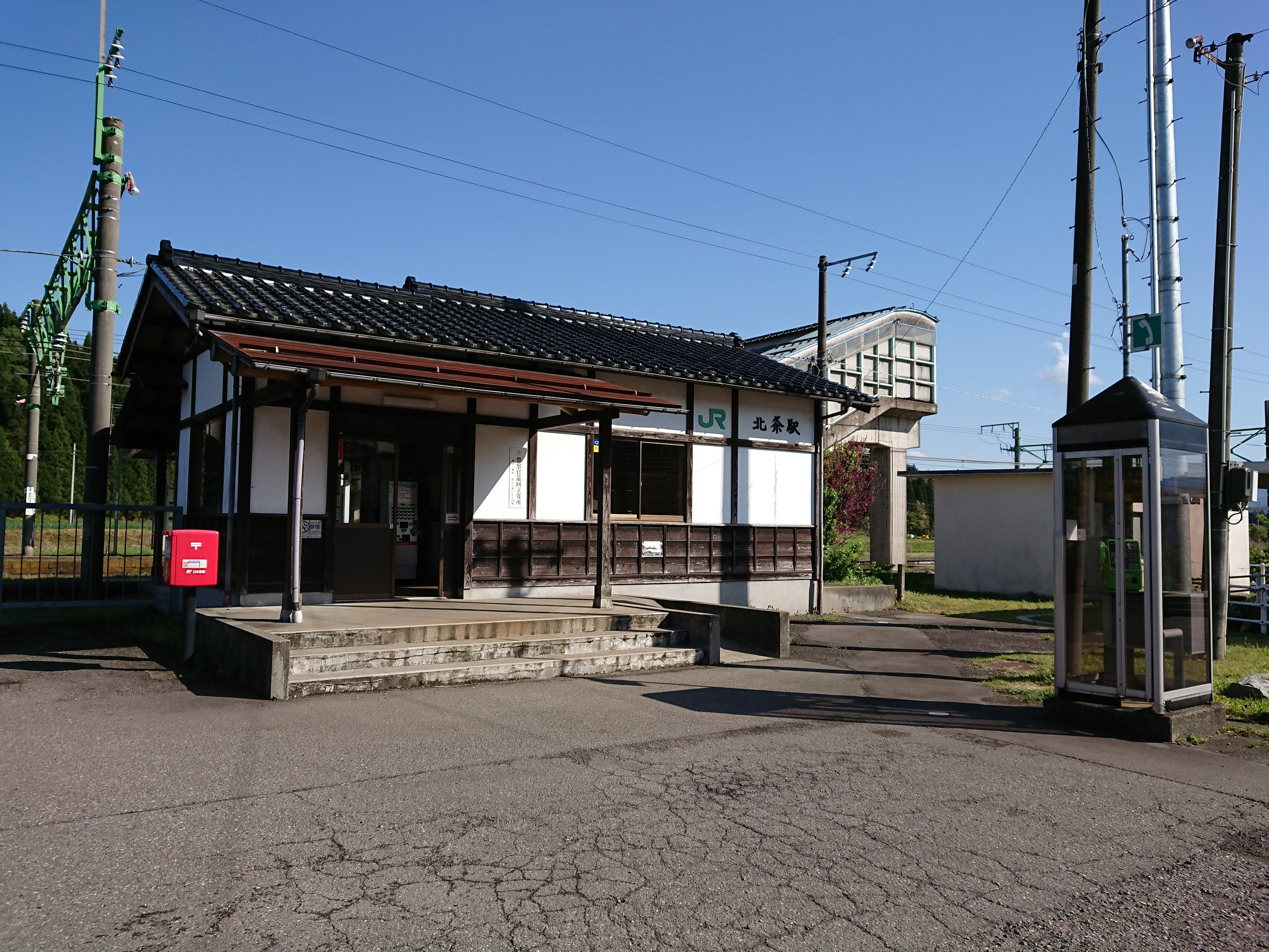
- Kitajō Station, May 2019

General information
- Location: 2301-1 Kitajō, Kashiwazaki-shi, Niigata-ken 949-3732; Japan
- Coordinates: 37.3383°N 138.6369°E
- Operator: JR East
- Line: ■ Shin'etsu Main Line
- Distance: 44.8 km to Naoetsu
- Platforms: 2 side platforms

Other information
- Status: Unstaffed
- Website: Official website

History
- Opened: 1 July 1897; 129 years ago

Services
Preceding station	JR East	Following station
Yasuda towards Naoetsu	Shin'etsu Main Line Local	Echigo-Hirota towards Niigata
Location
- Location within JR Shinetsu Main Line Location within Japan

Kitajō Station (北条駅, Kitajō-eki) is a railway station in the city of Kashiwazaki, Niigata, Japan, operated by East Japan Railway Company (JR East).

== Lines ==
Kitajō Station is served by the Shin'etsu Main Line and is 44.8 kilometers from the terminus of the line at Naoetsu.

== Station layout ==
The station consists of two ground-level opposed side platforms connected by a footbridge, serving two tracks. The station is unattended.

=== Platforms ===
1	■ Shin'etsu Main Line	for Kashiwazaki and Naoetsu
2	■ Shin'etsu Main Line	for and Nagaoka and Niigata

== History ==
Kitajō Station opened on 1 July 1897. With the privatization of Japanese National Railways (JNR) on 1 April 1987, the station came under the control of JR East.

== Surrounding area ==
- National Route 291
- Kitajō Post Office
- Kitajō Elementary School
- Kitajō Middle School
- Kitajō Castle ruins

== See also ==
- List of railway stations in Japan
