= Nagatori Station =

Railway station in Kashiwazaki, Niigata Prefecture, Japan

Nagatori Station 長鳥駅
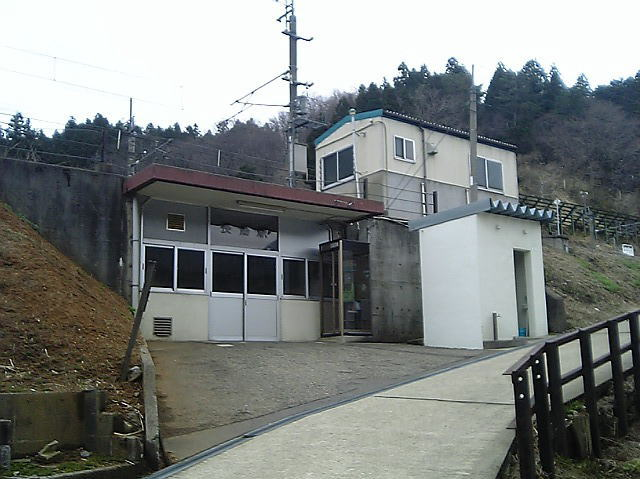
- Nagatori Station, April 2006

General information
- Location: NIshinagatori, Kashiwazaki-shi, Niigata-ken 949-3723; Japan
- Coordinates: 37.3666°N 138.6840°E
- Operator: JR East
- Line: ■ Shin'etsu Main Line
- Distance: 50.8 km to Naoetsu
- Platforms: 2 side platforms

Other information
- Status: Unstaffed
- Website: Official website

History
- Opened: 15 December 1953; 72 years ago

Services
Preceding station	JR East	Following station
Echigo-Hirota towards Naoetsu	Shin'etsu Main Line Local	Tsukayama towards Niigata
Location
- Location within JR Shinetsu Main Line Location within Japan

Nagatori Station (長鳥駅, Nagatori-eki) is a railway station in Kashiwazaki, Niigata, Japan, operated by East Japan Railway Company (JR East).

== Lines ==
Nagatori Station is served by the Shin'etsu Main Line and is 50.8 kilometers from the terminus of the line at Naoetsu Station.

== Station layout ==
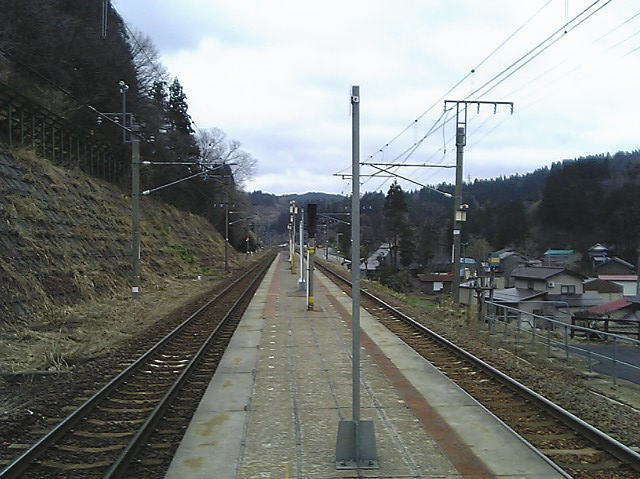
Platform (April 2006)

The station consists of a single ground-level island platform connected to the station building by an underground passage, serving two tracks. The station is unattended.

=== Platforms ===
south	■ Shin'etsu Main Line	for Kashiwazaki and Naoetsu
north	■ Shin'etsu Main Line	for Nagaoka and Niigata

== History ==
Nagatori Station opened on 15 December 1953. With the privatization of Japanese National Railways (JNR) on 1 April 1987, the station came under the control of JR East.

== Surrounding area ==
- The station is located in an isolated rural area, with few inhabitants. Niigata Prefectural Route 11 is near the station.

== See also ==
- List of railway stations in Japan
