= Nishi-Tsubame Station =

Railway station in Tsubame, Niigata Prefecture, Japan

Coordinates: 37.6799°N 138.9094°E

Nishi-Tsubame Station 西燕駅
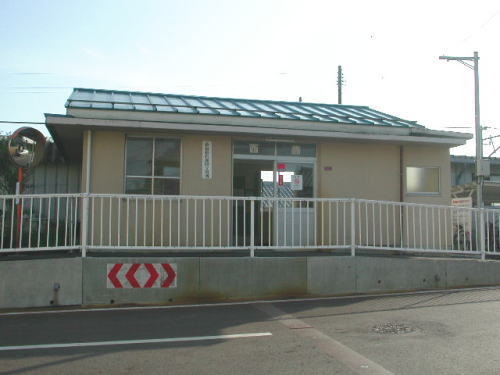
- Nishi-Tsubame Station in July 2004

General information
- Location: Hanami, Tsubame-shi, Niigata-ken 959-1280; Japan
- Operator: JR East
- Line: ■ Yahiko Line
- Distance: 8.0 km from Yahiko
- Platforms: 1 side platform

Other information
- Status: Unstaffed
- Website: Official website

History
- Opened: 25 December 1954; 71 years ago

Services
Preceding station	JR East	Following station
Yoshida towards Yahiko	Yahiko Line	Tsubame towards Higashi-Sanjō
Location
- Location within JR Yahiko Line Location within Japan

Nishi-Tsubame Station (西燕駅, Nishi-Tsubame-eki) is a railway station on the Yahiko Line in the city of Tsubame, Niigata, Japan operated by East Japan Railway Company (JR East).

== Lines ==
Nishi-Tsubame Station is served by the Yahiko Line, and is 8.0 kilometers from the terminus of the line at Yahiko Station.

== Station layout ==
The station consists of one side platform serving a single bi-directional track. The station is unattended.

== History ==
Nishi-Tsubame Station opened on 25 December 1954. With the privatization of Japanese National Railways (JNR) on 1 April 1987, the station came under the control of JR East.

== Surrounding area ==
- National Route 289
- Nishi-Tsubame Post Office

== See also ==
- List of railway stations in Japan
