= E129 series =

Japanese train type

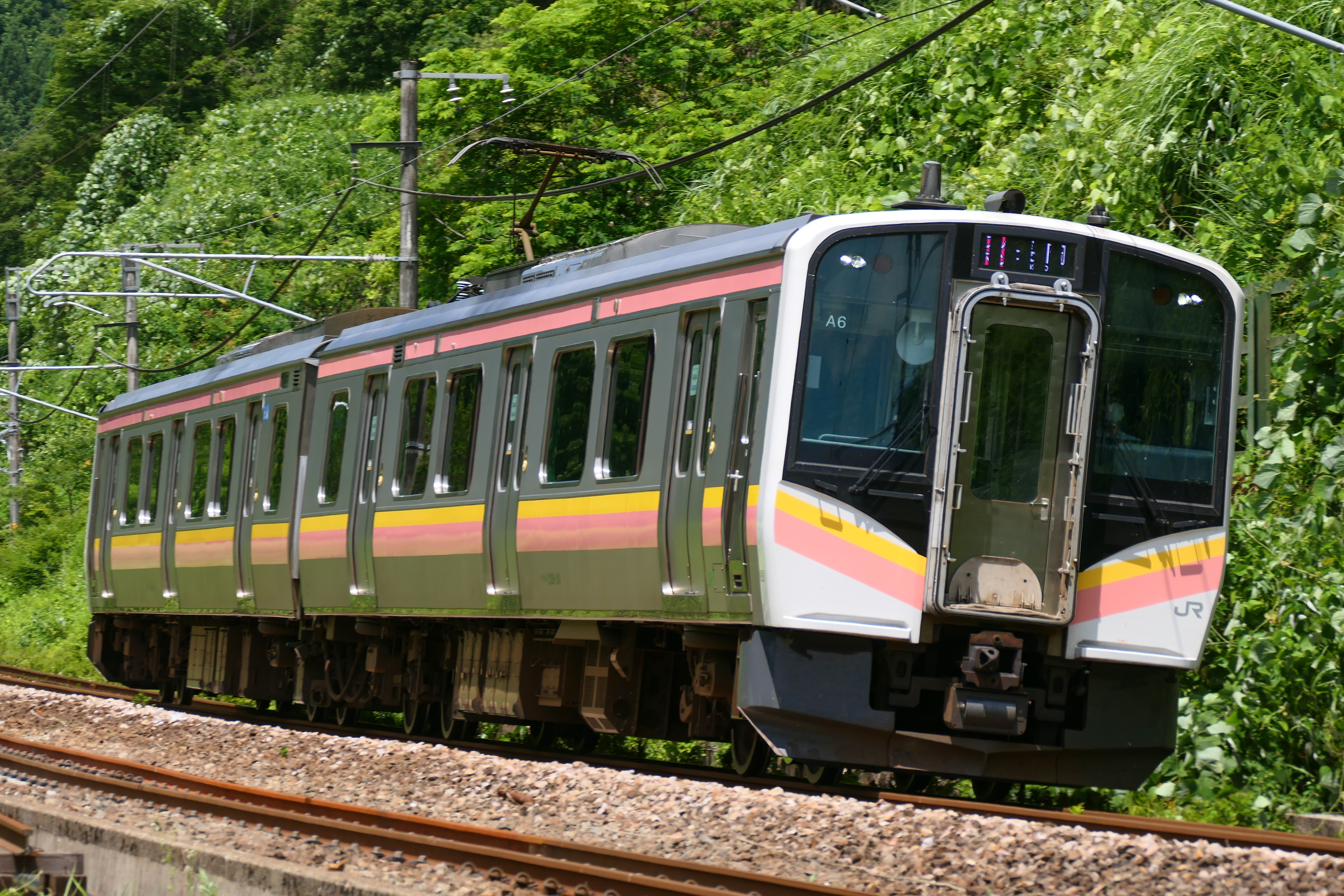
- Set A6 in July 2022
- Manufacturer: J-TREC
- Built at: Niitsu
- Family name: Sustina
- Replaced: 115 series
- Constructed: 2014–2018, 2022–present
- Entered service: 6 December 2014
- Number built: 176 vehicles (62 sets)
- Number in service: 172 vehicles (61 sets) (as of 7 March 2022)
- Formation: 2/4 cars per trainset
- Fleet numbers: A1–A34, B1–B27
- Operator: JR East
- Depot: Niigata

Specifications
- Car body construction: Stainless steel
- Car length: 19,570 mm (64 ft 2 in) (end cars); 19,500 mm (64 ft 0 in) (intermediate cars)
- Width: 2,950 mm (9 ft 8 in)
- Height: 3,620 mm (11 ft 11 in)
- Floor height: 1,130 mm (3 ft 8 in)
- Doors: 3 pairs per side
- Maximum speed: 110 km/h (68 mph)
- Traction system: Variable frequency (IGBT)
- Acceleration: 2.0 km/(h⋅s) (1.2 mph/s)
- Deceleration: 3.6 km/(h⋅s) (2.2 mph/s)
- Electric system: 1,500 V DC
- Current collection: Overhead catenary
- Bogies: DT71 (motored); TR255 (trailer)
- Safety systems: ATS-P, ATS-Ps
- Multiple working: E127 series, under emergency conditions
- Track gauge: 1,067 mm (3 ft 6 in)

The E129 series (E129系) is a DC electric multiple unit (EMU) train type operated by East Japan Railway Company (JR East) on local services in the Niigata area since 6 December 2014.

== Design ==
Built at the J-TREC factory in Niitsu, Niigata, the stainless steel body and "universal design" interior is derived from the E233 series commuter EMU. Externally, trains are finished in a livery with "golden yellow" (黄金イエロー) and "toki pink" (朱鷺ピンク) stripes. The trains have a maximum speed of 110 km/h (68 mph).

== Operations ==
Operations in Niigata area

E129 series trains operate on the following lines, completely replacing older 115 series sets by around 2017.

- Joetsu Line (Minakami – Nagaoka)
- Shinetsu Main Line (Naoetsu – Niigata)
- Uetsu Main Line (Niitsu – Murakami)
- Hakushin Line (Niigata – Shibata)
- Echigo Line (Kashiwazaki – Niigata)
- Yahiko Line (Higashi-Sanjō – Yahiko)

The E129 series trains can operated in multiple, to form 2+2, 2+4, and 2+2+2 formations, but do not operate in multiple with E127 series trains except in emergencies.

== Fleet ==
As of 8 March 2022, the E129 series fleet consists of 34 two-car sets (68 vehicles) numbered A1 to A34 and 27 four-car sets (108 vehicles) numbered B1 to B27. All sets are based at Niigata Depot.

== Formations ==
=== 2-car sets A1-A34 ===
The two-car sets, A1 to A34, consist of two motored cars, each with one powered bogie, and are formed as shown below.

| Designation | Mc-100 | Mc'-100 |
| Numbering | KuMoHa E129-100 | KuMoHa E128-100 |
| Weight (t) | 37.2 | 37.2 |
| Capacity (total/seated) | 140/50 | 133/46 |

- The KuMoHa E129-100 car is fitted with a PS33G single-arm pantograph (cars KuMoHa E129-123 to KuMoHa E129-130 have two pantographs, and weigh 37.4 t).
- The KuMoHa E128-100 car has a universal access toilet.

=== 4-car sets B1-B27 ===
The four-car sets, B1 to B27, consist of four motored cars, each with one powered bogie, and are formed as shown below.

| Designation | Mc-0 | M'-0 | M-0 | Mc'-0 |
| Numbering | KuMoHa E129 | MoHa E128 | MoHa E129 | KuMoHa E128 |
| Weight (t) | 37.2 | 31.6 | 32.7 | 37.0 |
| Capacity (total/seated) | 140/50 | 154/60 | 154/60 | 133/46 |

- The KuMoHa E129 and MoHa E129 cars are each fitted with one PS33G single-arm pantograph.
- The KuMoHa E128 car has a universal access toilet.

== Interior ==
Passenger accommodation consists of a mix of transverse seating bays and longitudinal bench seating. LED lighting is used throughout. Longitudinal seats have a width of 460 mm (1 ft 6 in) per person, 1 cm (0.39 in) wider than for the earlier E127 series trains, and the seating pitch for transverse seating bays is 540 mm (1 ft 9 in), approximately 11 cm (4.3 in) wider than E233 series trains. Floor height is 1,130 mm (3 ft 8 in), the same as for E127 series trains, and lower than the 1,225 mm (4 ft 0.2 in) floor height of 115 series trains.

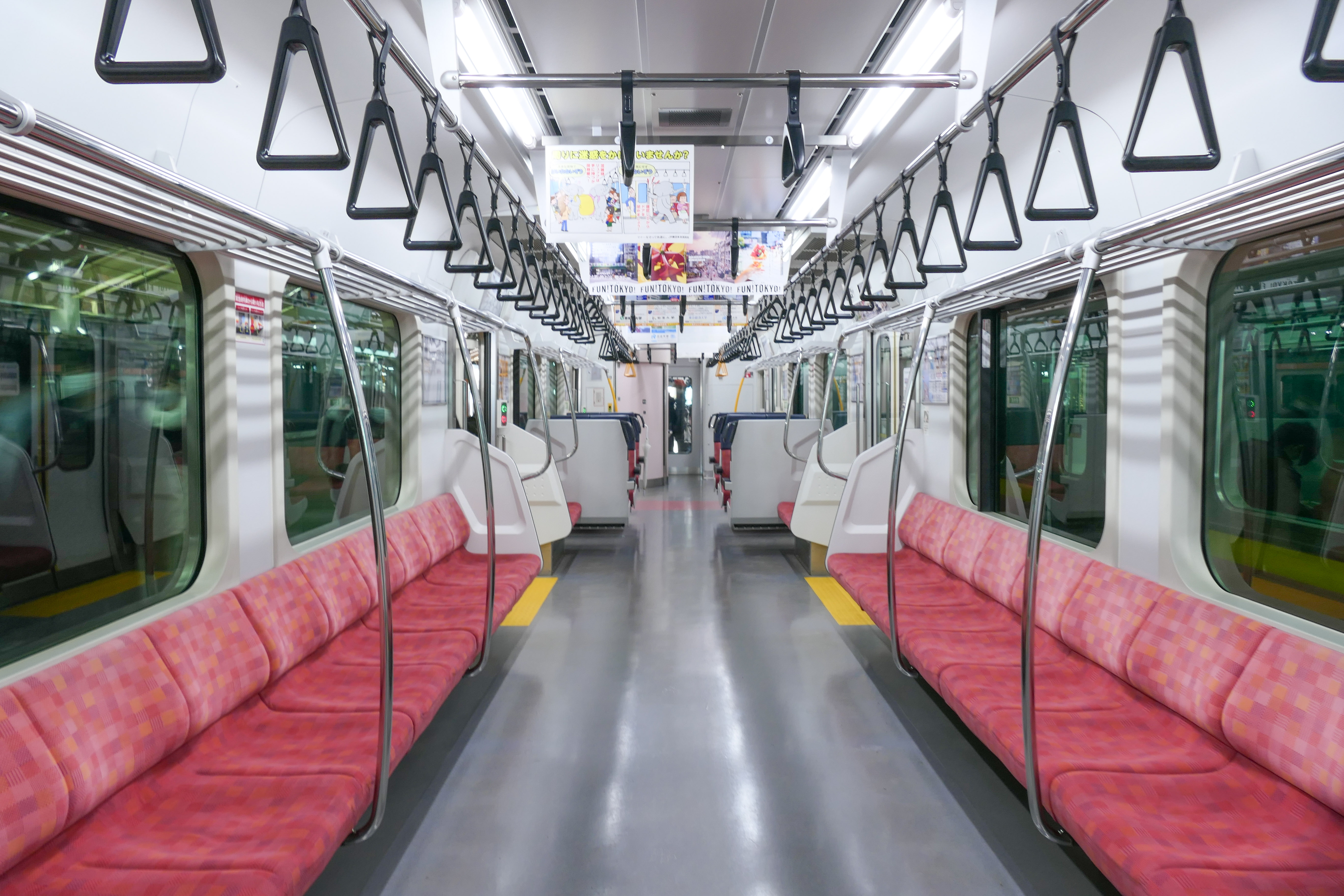
Interior view

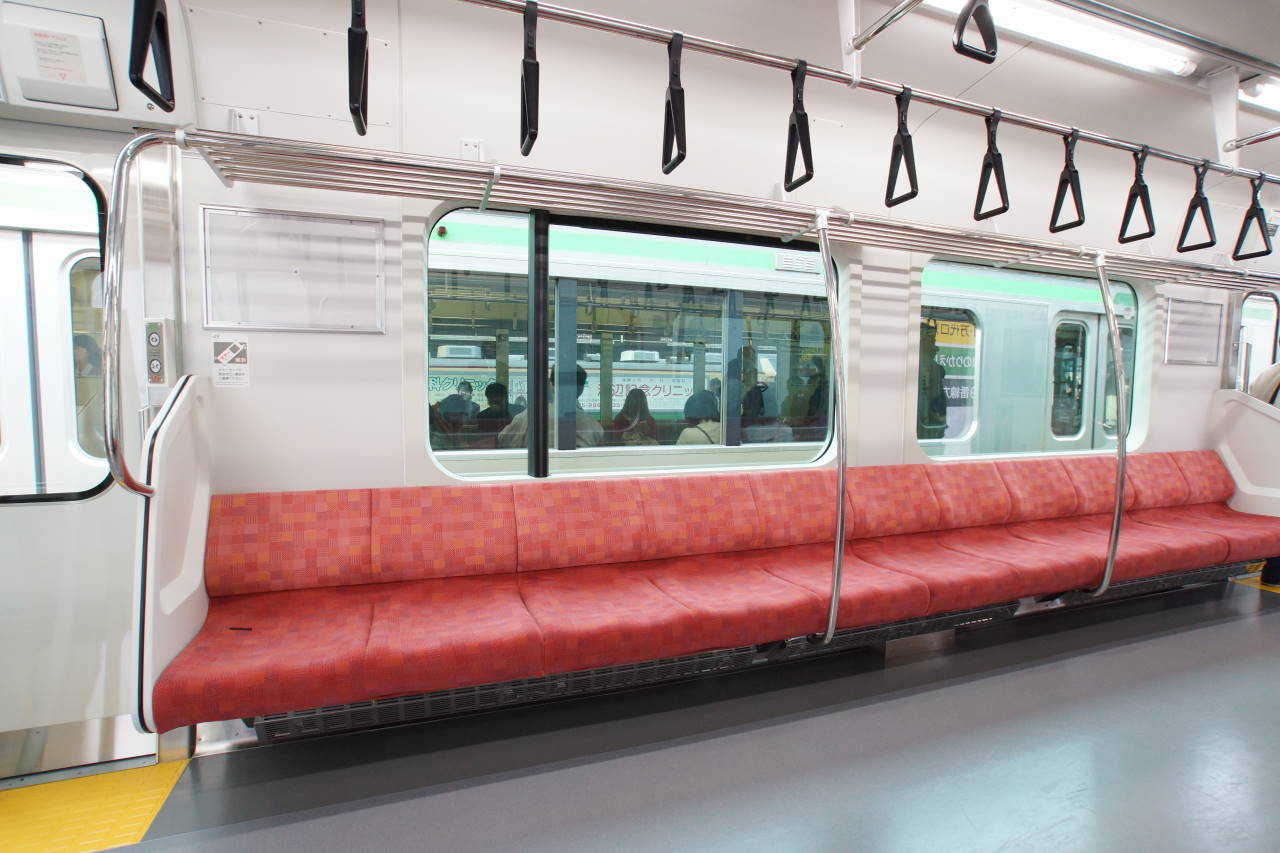
Longitudinal bench seating

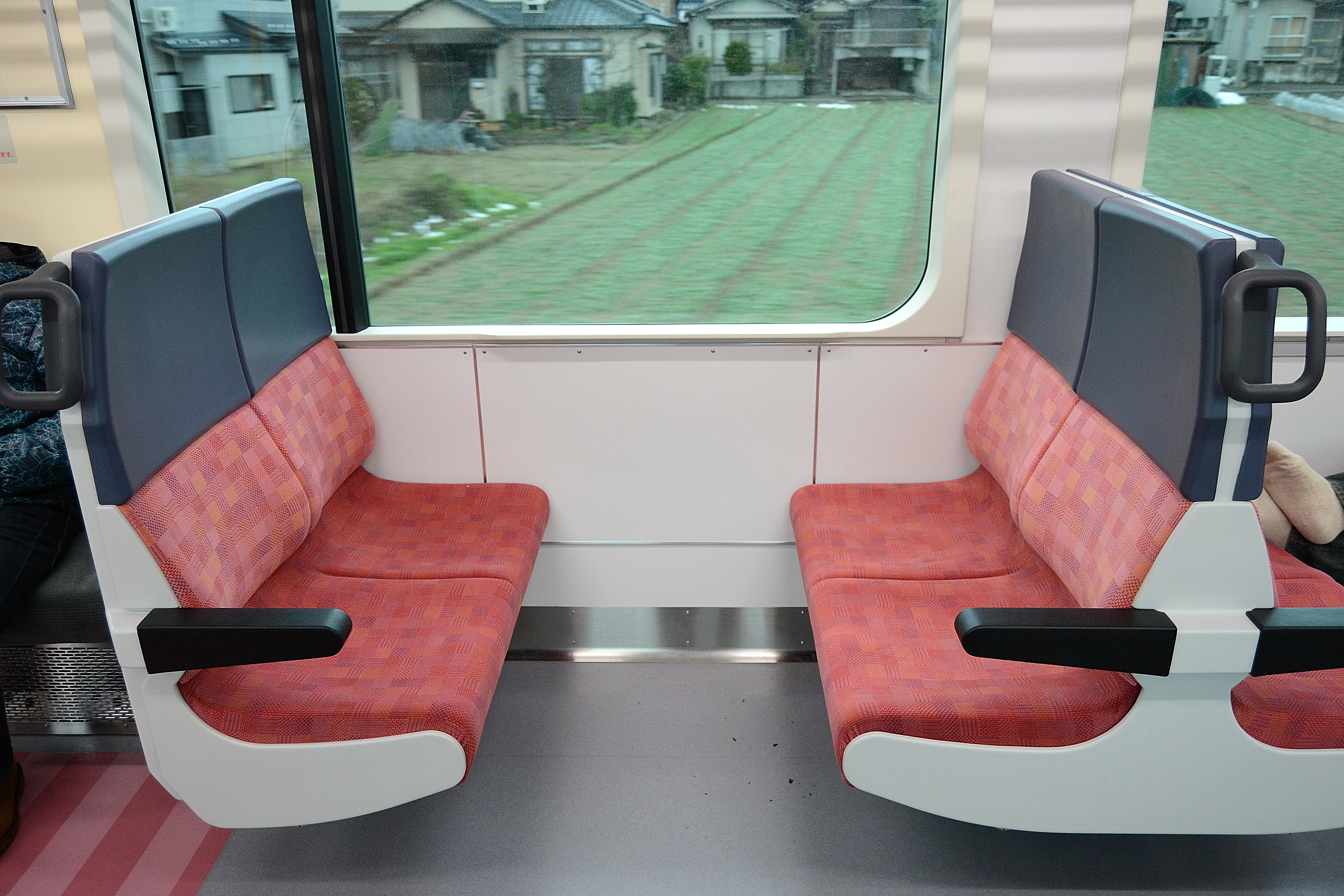
A transverse seating bay

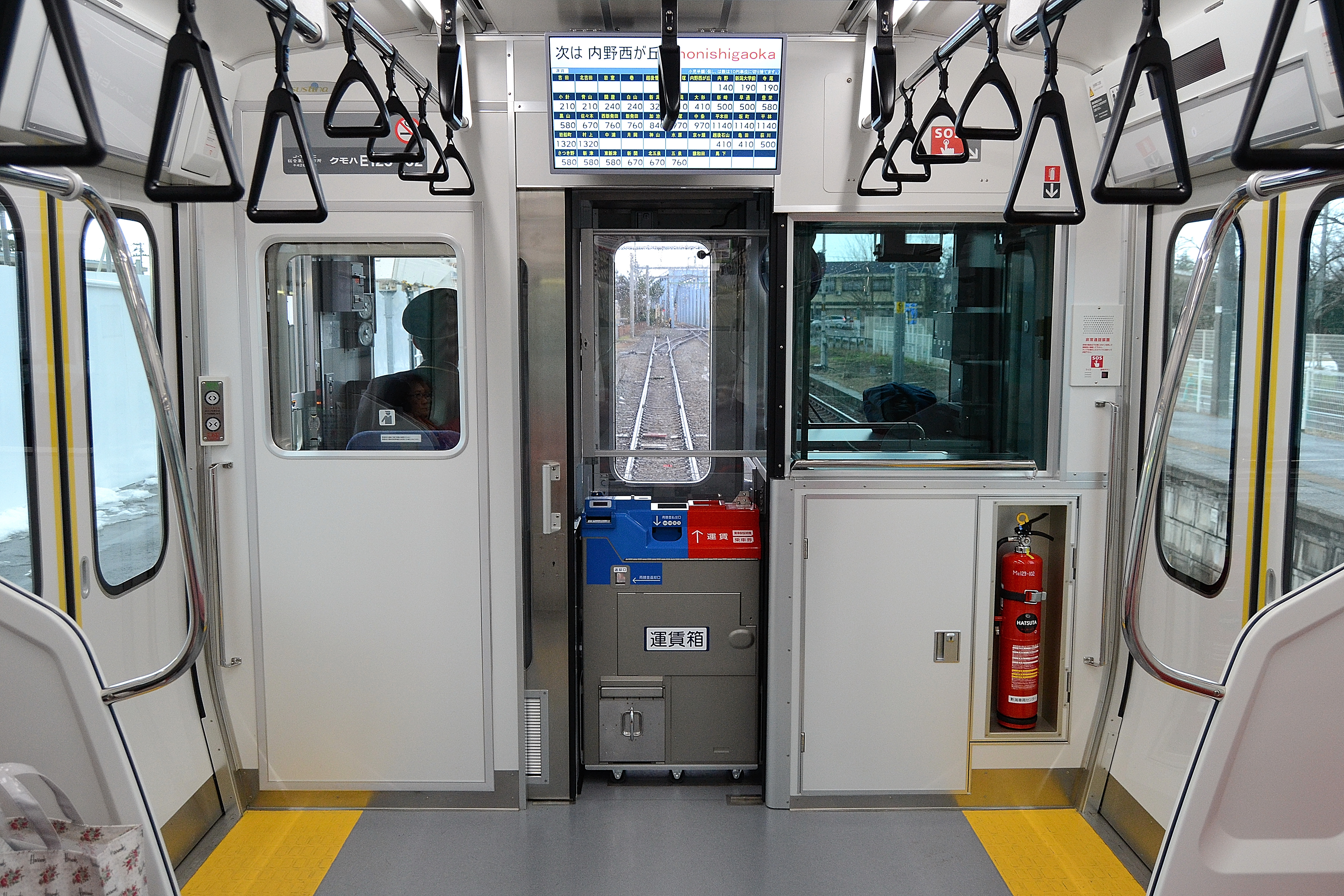
Driver's cab

== History ==
Initial details of the new trains were announced by JR East in July 2013. The first two two-car sets, A1 and A2, were delivered on 8 October 2014, with test-running commencing the same day.

The first trains entered revenue service on 6 December 2014.

== Fleet details ==
As of 31 December 2017, the fleet is as follows.

=== 2-car sets ===
| Set No. | Date delivered |
|---|---|
| A1 | 17 October 2014 |
| A2 | 17 October 2014 |
| A3 | 17 October 2014 |
| A4 | 23 October 2014 |
| A5 | 7 November 2014 |
| A6 | 21 November 2014 |
| A7 | 8 December 2014 |
| A8 | 22 December 2014 |
| A9 | 15 January 2015 |
| A10 | 28 January 2015 |
| A11 | 27 February 2015 |
| A12 | 27 February 2015 |
| A13 | 20 April 2015 |
| A14 | 20 April 2015 |
| A15 | 21 May 2015 |
| A16 | 21 May 2015 |
| A17 | 18 June 2015 |
| A18 | 18 June 2015 |
| A19 | 16 July 2015 |
| A20 | 16 July 2015 |
| A21 | 20 August 2015 |
| A22 | 20 August 2015 |
| A23 | 15 September 2015 |
| A24 | 15 September 2015 |
| A25 | 16 October 2015 |
| A26 | 16 October 2015 |
| A27 | 11 November 2015 |
| A28 | 11 November 2015 |
| A29 | 2 December 2015 |
| A30 | 1 February 2016 |
| A31 | 11 December 2017 |
| A32 | 26 December 2017 |
| A33 | 21 February 2022 |
| A34 | 21 February 2022 |

=== 4-car sets ===
| Set No. | Date delivered |
|---|---|
| B1 | 28 January 2016 |
| B2 | 29 January 2016 |
| B3 | 1 February 2016 |
| B4 | 5 February 2016 |
| B5 | 15 February 2016 |
| B6 | 19 February 2016 |
| B7 | 26 February 2016 |
| B8 | 4 March 2016 |
| B9 | 10 March 2016 |
| B10 | 17 March 2016 |
| B11 | 24 March 2016 |
| B12 | 31 March 2016 |
| B13 | 9 June 2016 |
| B14 | 21 June 2016 |
| B15 | 1 July 2016 |
| B16 | 13 July 2016 |
| B17 | 27 July 2016 |
| B18 | 5 August 2016 |
| B19 | 22 August 2016 |
| B20 | 1 September 2016 |
| B21 | 13 September 2016 |
| B22 | 26 September 2016 |
| B23 | 27 January 2017 |
| B24 | 6 February 2017 |
| B25 | 14 February 2017 |
| B26 | 23 February 2018 |
| B27 | 1 March 2022 |

== Derivatives ==
Delivery of three two-car SR1 series (SR1系) sets from J-TREC in Niitsu began in March 2020. They are derived from the E129 series and are scheduled to replace the 115 series currently operated by Shinano Railway. These trains were put into service of rapid trains operated by Shinano Railway starting from 4 July 2020.

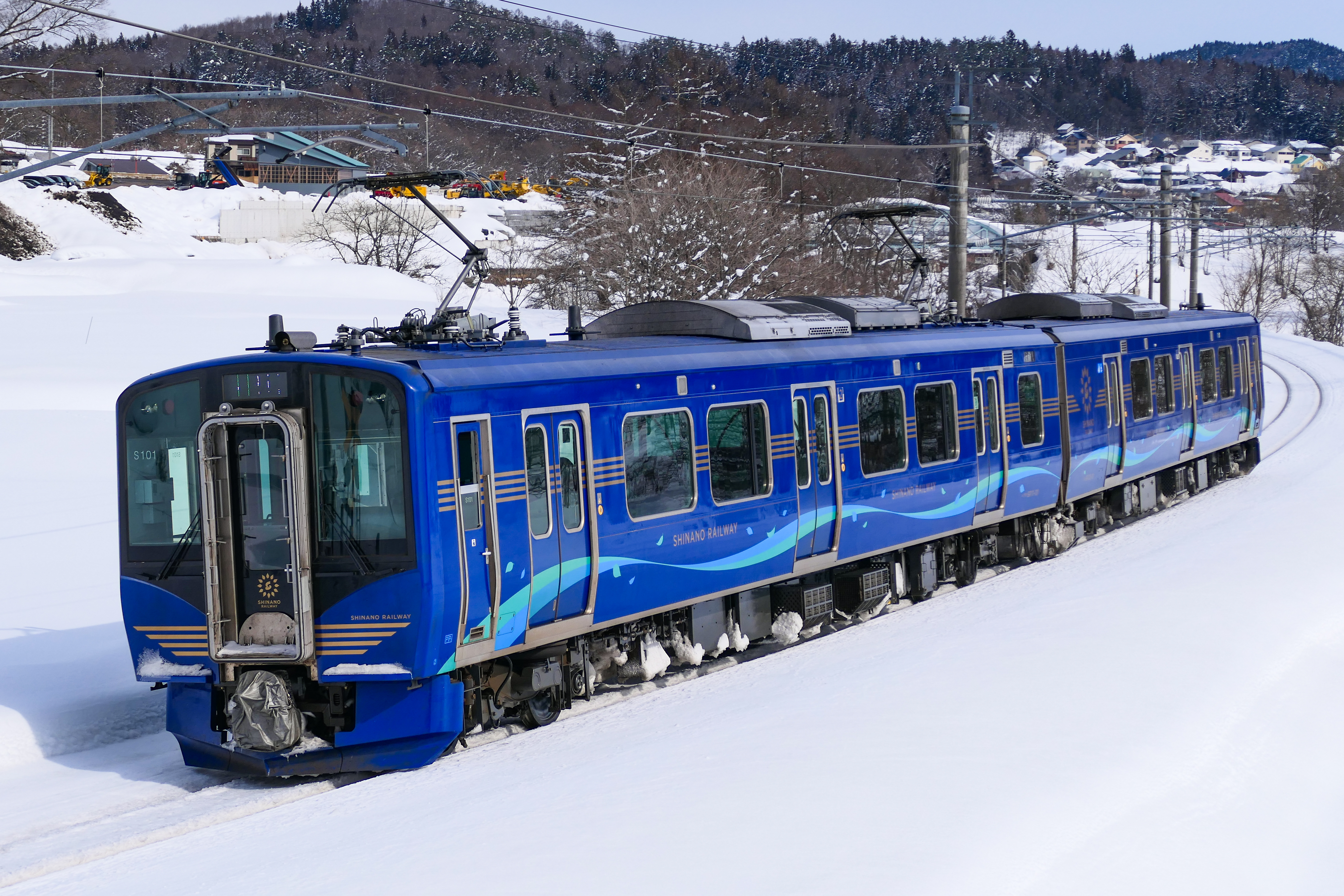
SR1 series set S101 in February 2022

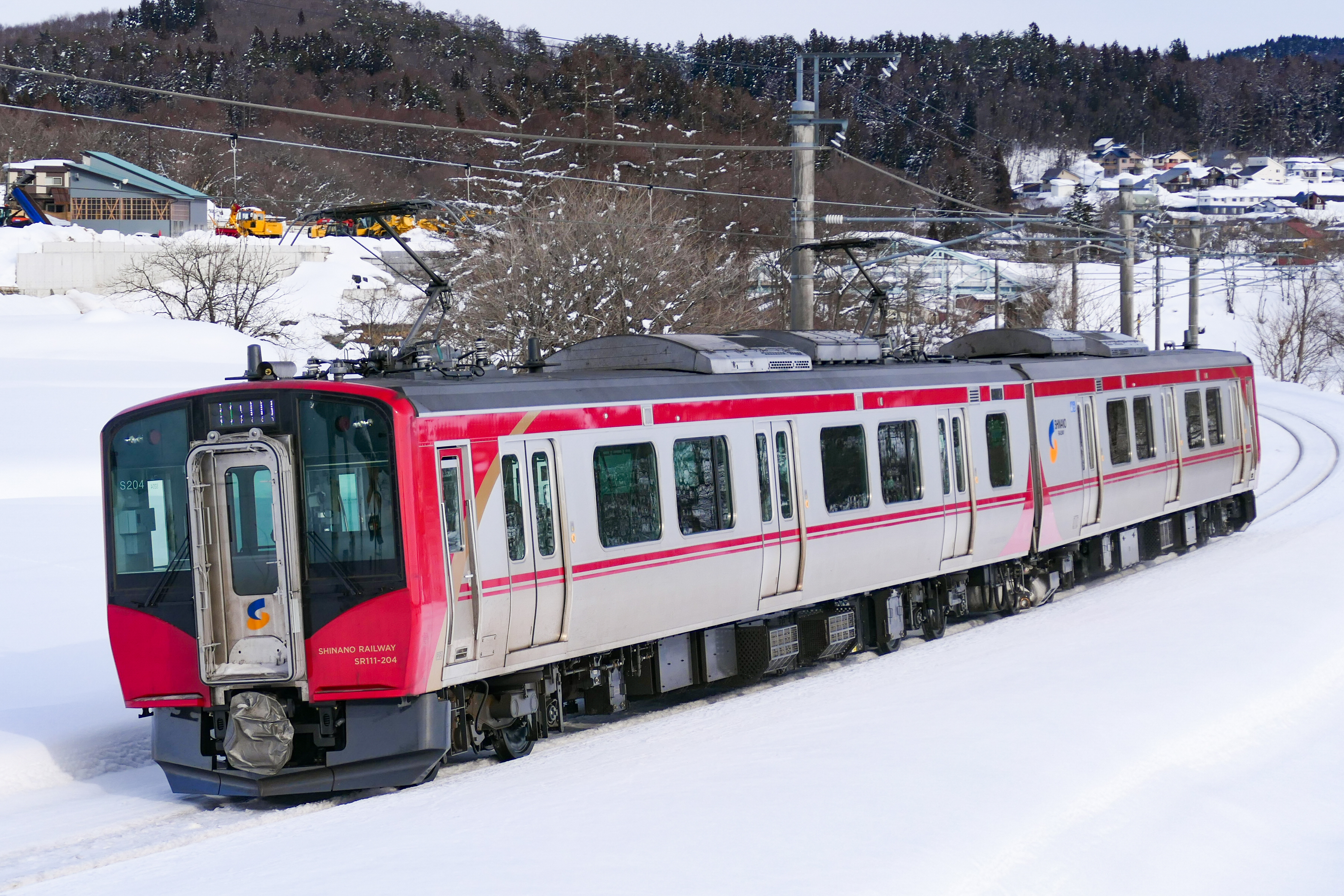
SR1 series set S204 in February 2022
