= Yoshida Station =

Railway station in Tsubame, Niigata Prefecture, Japan

Yoshida Station 吉田駅
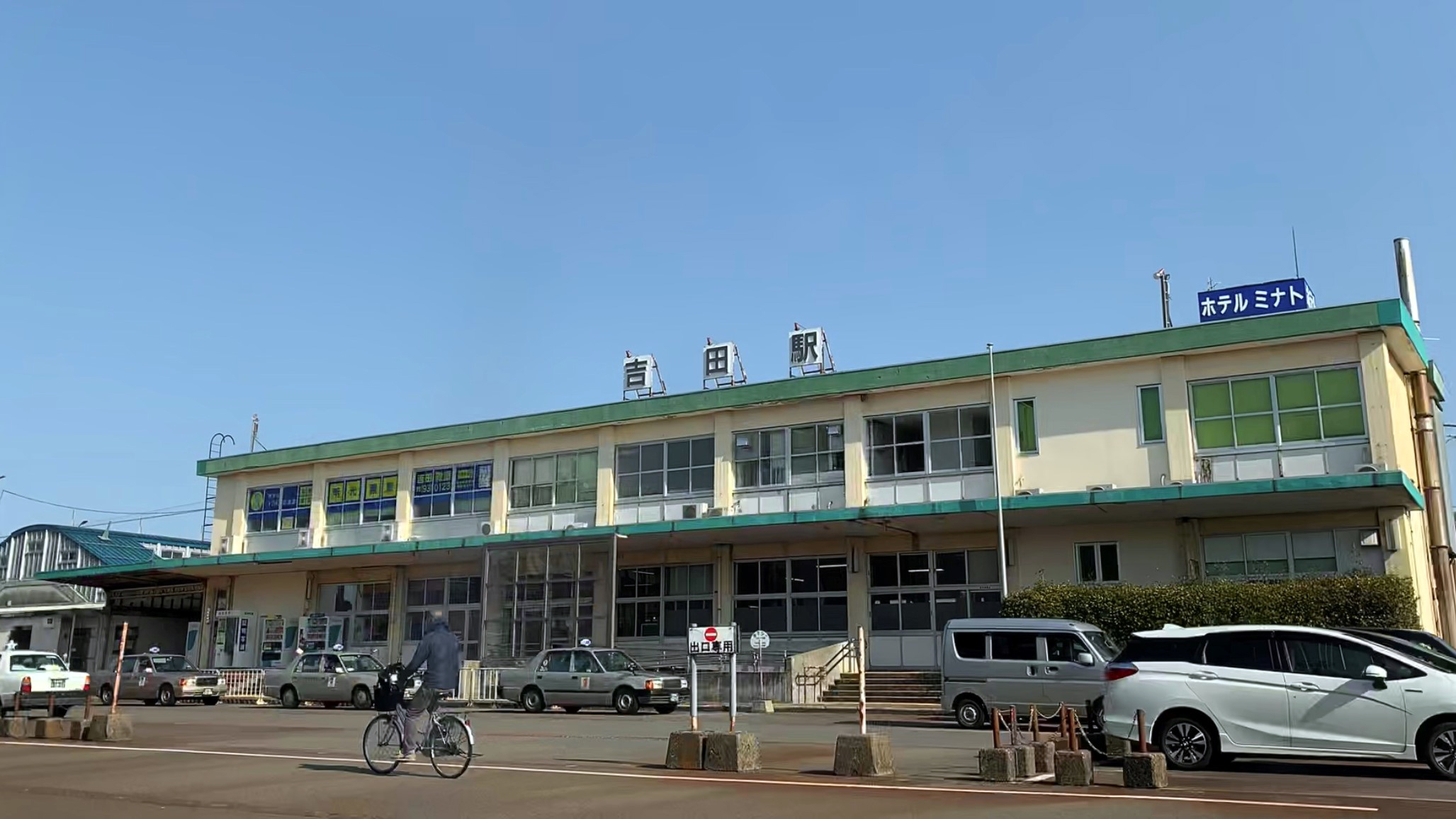
- Yoshida Station in March 2020

General information
- Location: Yoshida-Tsutsumi-chō, Tsubame-shi, Niigata-ken 959-0237; Japan
- Coordinates: 37°41′14″N 138°52′43″E
- Operator: JR East
- Lines: ■ Echigo Line; ■ Yahiko Line
- Platforms: 1 side + 2 island platforms
- Tracks: 5

Other information
- Status: Staffed (Midori no Madoguchi)
- Website: Official website

History
- Opened: 25 August 1912; 113 years ago
- Former names: Nisei-Yoshida (1913 -1959)

Passengers
- FY2017: 1,514 daily

Services
Preceding station	JR East	Following station
Minami-Yoshida towards Kashiwazaki	Echigo Line	Kita-Yoshida towards Niigata
Yahagi towards Yahiko	Yahiko Line	Nishi-Tsubame towards Higashi-Sanjō
Location
- Location within JR Echigo Line Location within JR Yahiko Line Location within Japan

Yoshida Station (吉田駅, Yoshida-eki) is a railway station in Tsubame, Niigata, Japan, operated by East Japan Railway Company (JR East).

== Lines ==
Yoshida Station is served by the Yahiko Line, and is 4.9 kilometers from the starting point of the line at Yahiko. It is also served by the Echigo Line and is 49.8 kilometers from the terminus of the line at Kashiwazaki.

== Station layout ==
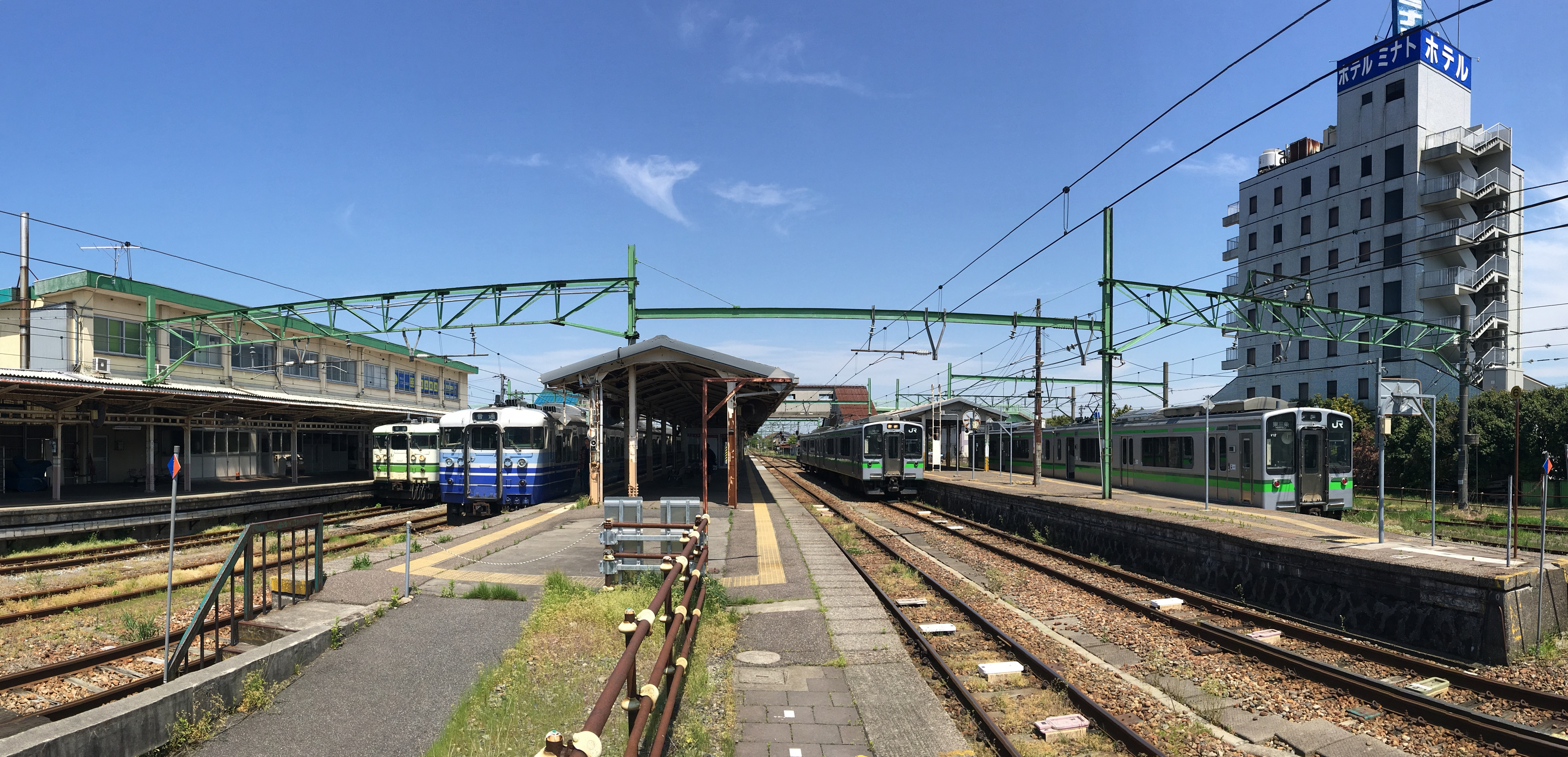
View of station platforms with platform 5 on the right, May 2017

The station consists of one side platform and two island platforms serving five tracks. The platforms are connected by a footbridge. The station has a Midori no Madoguchi staffed ticket office. The station has toilets and a concessions store.

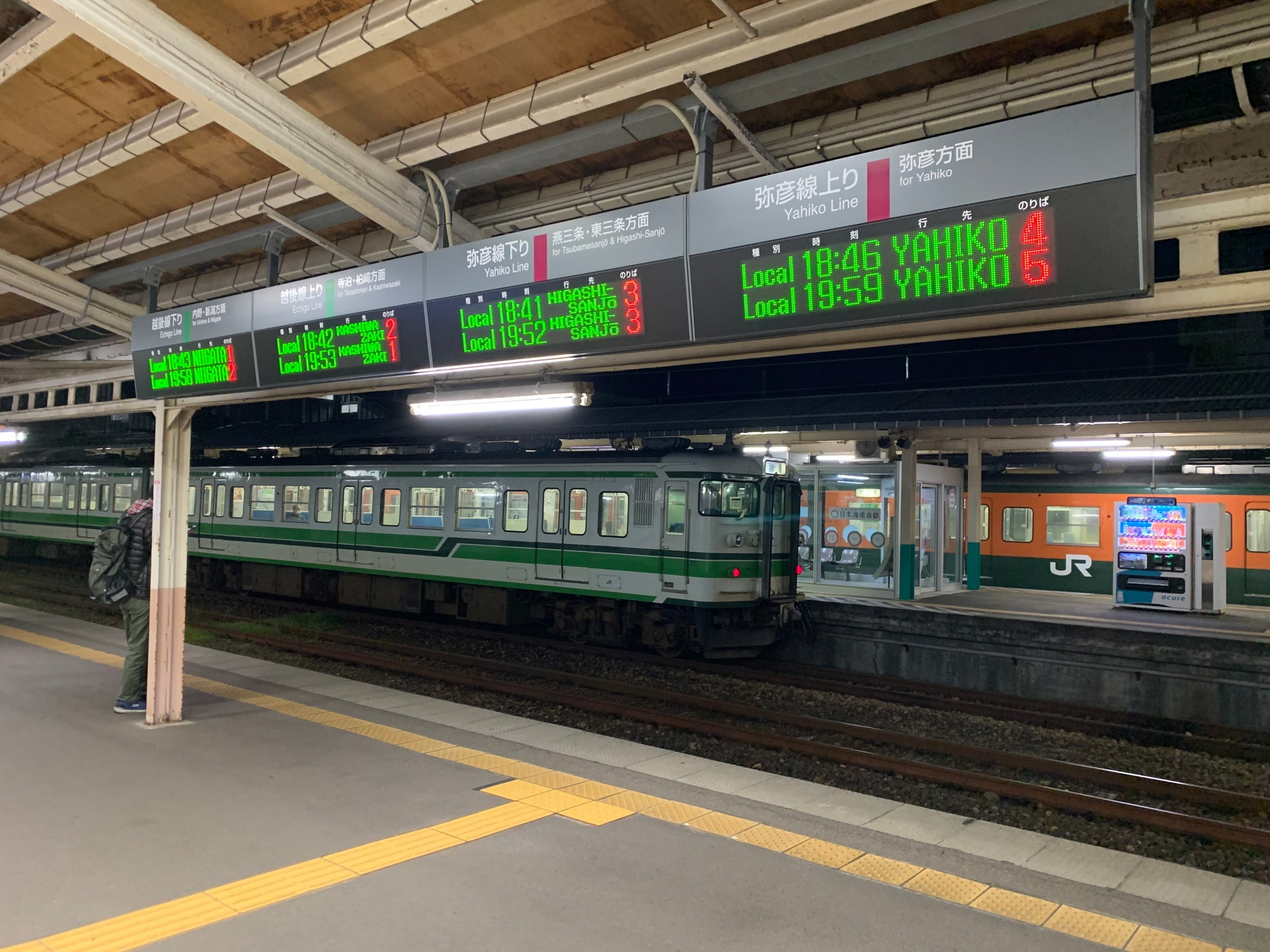
LED displays

=== Platforms ===
1	■ Echigo Line	for Maki, Uchino, and Niigata
2	■ Echigo Line	for Bunsui, Izumozaki, and Kashiwazaki
3	■ Yahiko Line	for Tsubame, Tsubame-Sanjō, and Higashi-Sanjō
4	■ Yahiko Line	for Yahiko
5	■ Yahiko Line	(not normally used)

== History ==
The station opened on 25 August 1912. Then station was renamed Nishi-Yoshida Station (西吉田駅) on 20 April 1913, but reverted to its original name on 1 October 1959. With the privatization of Japanese National Railways (JNR) on 1 April 1987, the station came under the control of JR East.

== Passenger statistics ==
In fiscal 2017, the station was used by an average of 1514 passengers daily (boarding passengers only). The passenger figures for previous years are as shown below.

Fiscal year	Daily average
2000	2,055
2005	1,721
2010	1,745
2015	1,580

== Surrounding area ==
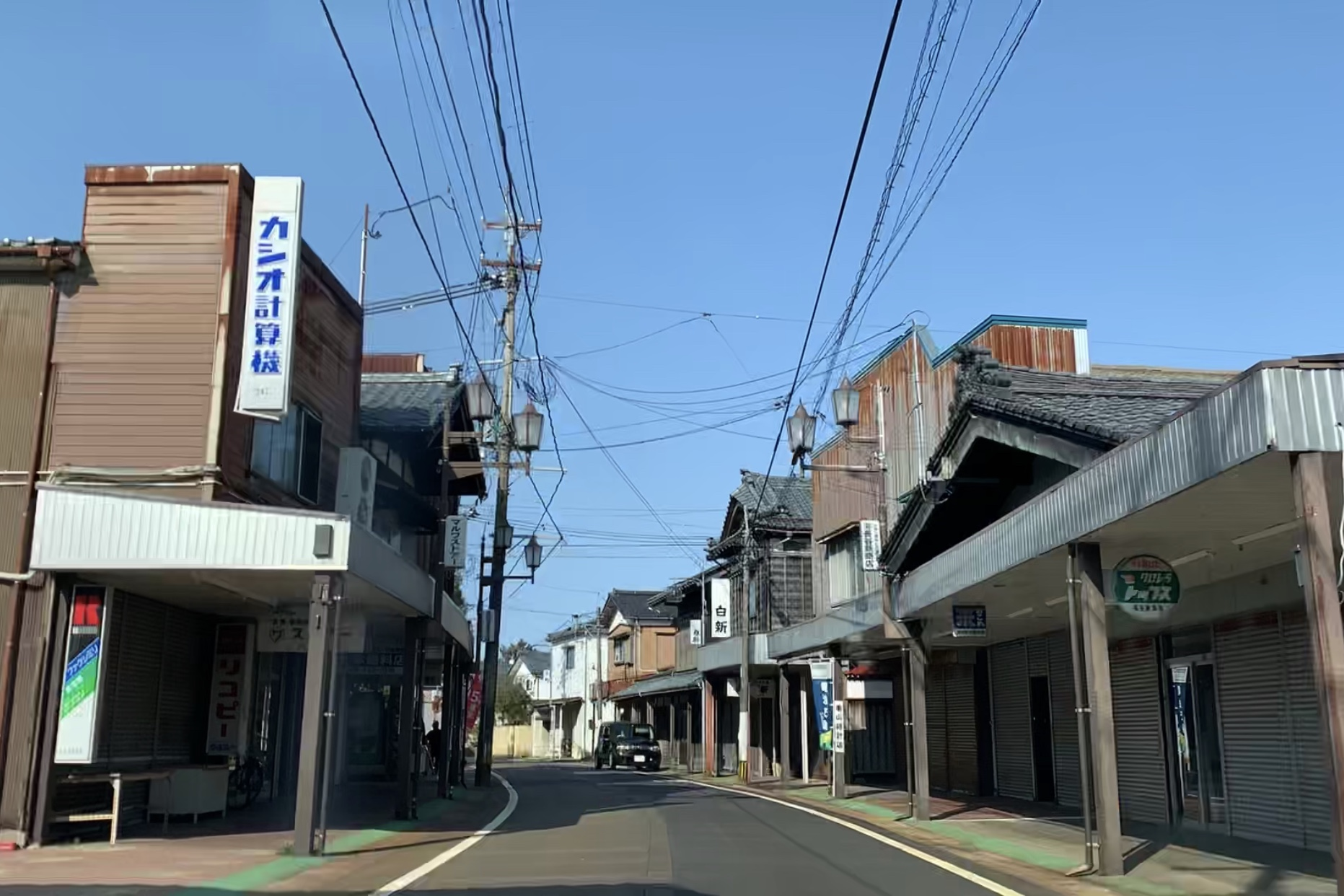
A street near the station

- Niigata Prefectural Yoshida High School
- National Route 116

== See also ==
- List of railway stations in Japan
