= Tsubame Station =

Railway station in Tsubame, Niigata Prefecture, Japan

Tsubame Station 燕駅
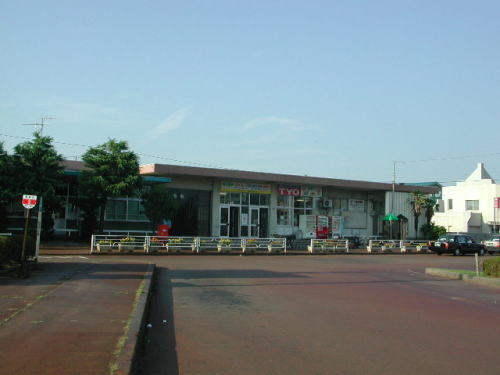
- Tsubame Station in July 2004

General information
- Location: 2 Tsubame Honcho, Tsubame-shi, Niigata-ken 959-128; Japan
- Coordinates: 37.6683°N 138.9289°E
- Operator: JR East
- Line: ■ Yahiko Line
- Distance: 10.3 km from Yahiko
- Platforms: 2 side platforms
- Tracks: 2

Other information
- Status: Unstaffed station (Automatic ticket vending machine installation)
- Website: Official website

History
- Opened: 20 April 1922; 104 years ago

Passengers
- FY2015: 1,040 daily

Services
Preceding station	JR East	Following station
Nishi-Tsubame towards Yahiko	Yahiko Line	Tsubame-Sanjō towards Higashi-Sanjō
Location
- Location within JR Yahiko Line Location within Japan

Tsubame Station (燕駅, Tsubame-eki) is a railway station located in Tsubame, Niigata, Japan operated by East Japan Railway Company (JR East).

== Lines ==
Tsubame Station is served by the Yahiko Line, and is 10.3 kilometers from the terminus of the line at Yahiko Station.

== Station layout ==
The station consists of two opposed ground-level side platforms serving two tracks. connected by a footbridge.

The station is unstaffed, but there is an automatic ticket vending machine. Suica farecards can be used at this station.

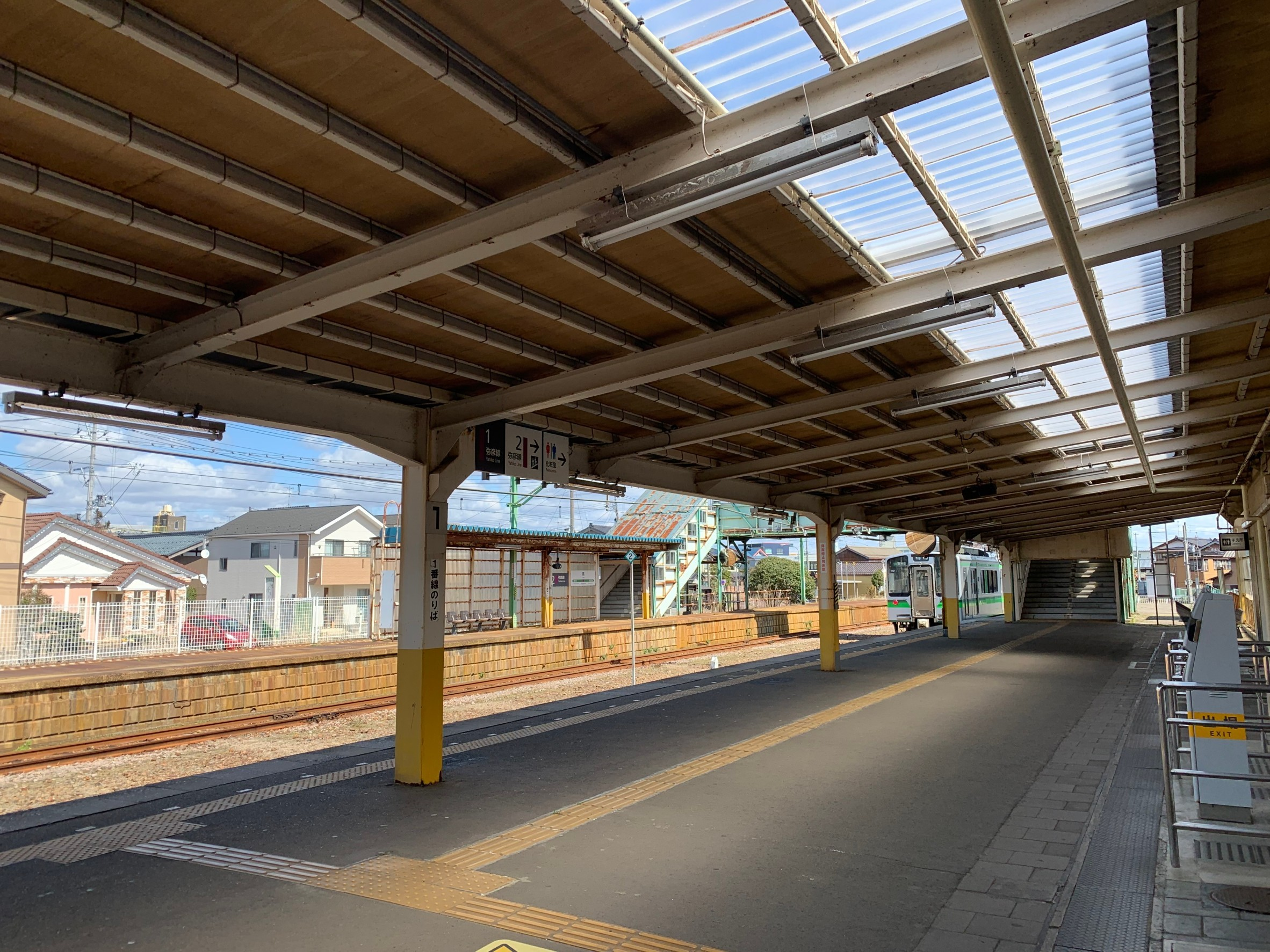
Platforms, March 2020

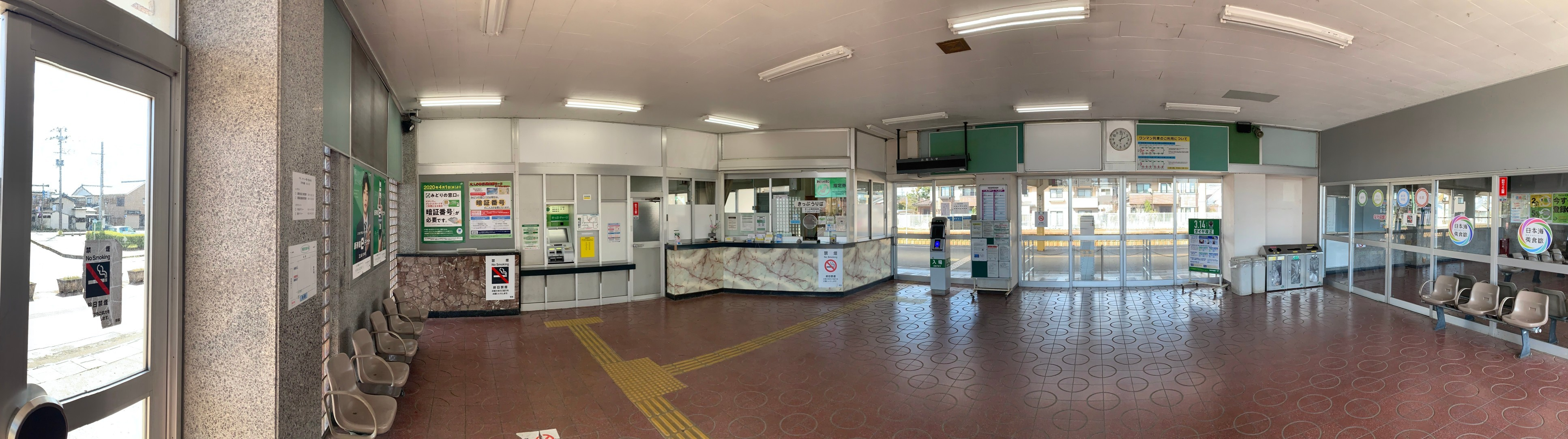
Station interior, March 2020

=== Platforms ===
1	■ Yahiko Line	for Tsubame-Sanjō and Higashi-Sanjō
2	■ Yahiko Line	for Yoshida and Yahiko

== History ==
Tsubame Station opened on 20 April 1922. With the privatization of Japanese National Railways (JNR) on 1 April 1987, the station came under the control of JR East.

== Passenger statistics ==
In fiscal 2015, the station was used by an average of 1,040 passengers daily (boarding passengers only).

== Surrounding area ==
- Tsubame-Higashi Elementary School

== See also ==
- List of railway stations in Japan
