= Yahagi Station =

Railway station in Yahiko, Niigata Prefecture, Japan

Yahagi Station 矢作駅
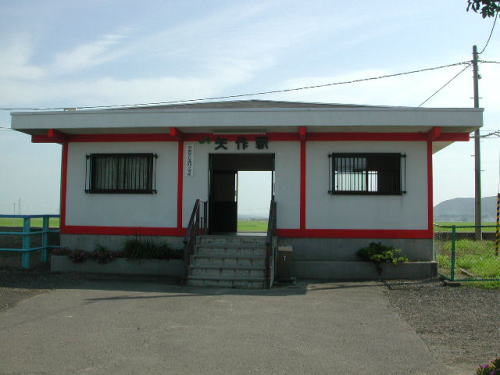
- Yahagi Station in July 2004

General information
- Location: Yahagi, Yahiko-mura, Nishikanbara-gun, Niigata-ken 959-0305; Japan
- Coordinates: 37.6905°N 138.8514°E
- Operator: JR East
- Line: ■ Yahiko Line
- Distance: 2.0 km from Yahiko
- Platforms: 1 side platform
- Tracks: 1

Other information
- Status: unstaffed
- Website: Official website

History
- Opened: 16 October 1916; 109 years ago

Services
Preceding station	JR East	Following station
Yahiko Terminus	Yahiko Line	Yoshida towards Higashi-Sanjō
Location
- Location within JR Yahiko Line Location within Japan

Yahagi Station (矢作駅, Yahagi-eki) is a railway station on the Yahiko Line in the village of Yahiko, Niigata, Japan, operated by East Japan Railway Company (JR East).

== Lines ==
Yahagi Station is served by the Yahiko Line and is 2.0 kilometers from terminus of the line at Yahiko Station.

== Station layout ==
The station consists of one ground-level side platform serving a single bi-directional track. The station is unattended. Suica farecards can be used at this station.

== History ==
The station opened on 16 October 1916. With the privatization of Japanese National Railways (JNR) on 1 April 1987, the station came under the control of JR East.

== Surrounding area ==
- Yahiko village hall
- Yahiko Elementary School
- Yahiko Junior High School

== See also ==
- List of railway stations in Japan
