= E127 series =

Japanese DC electric multiple unit train type

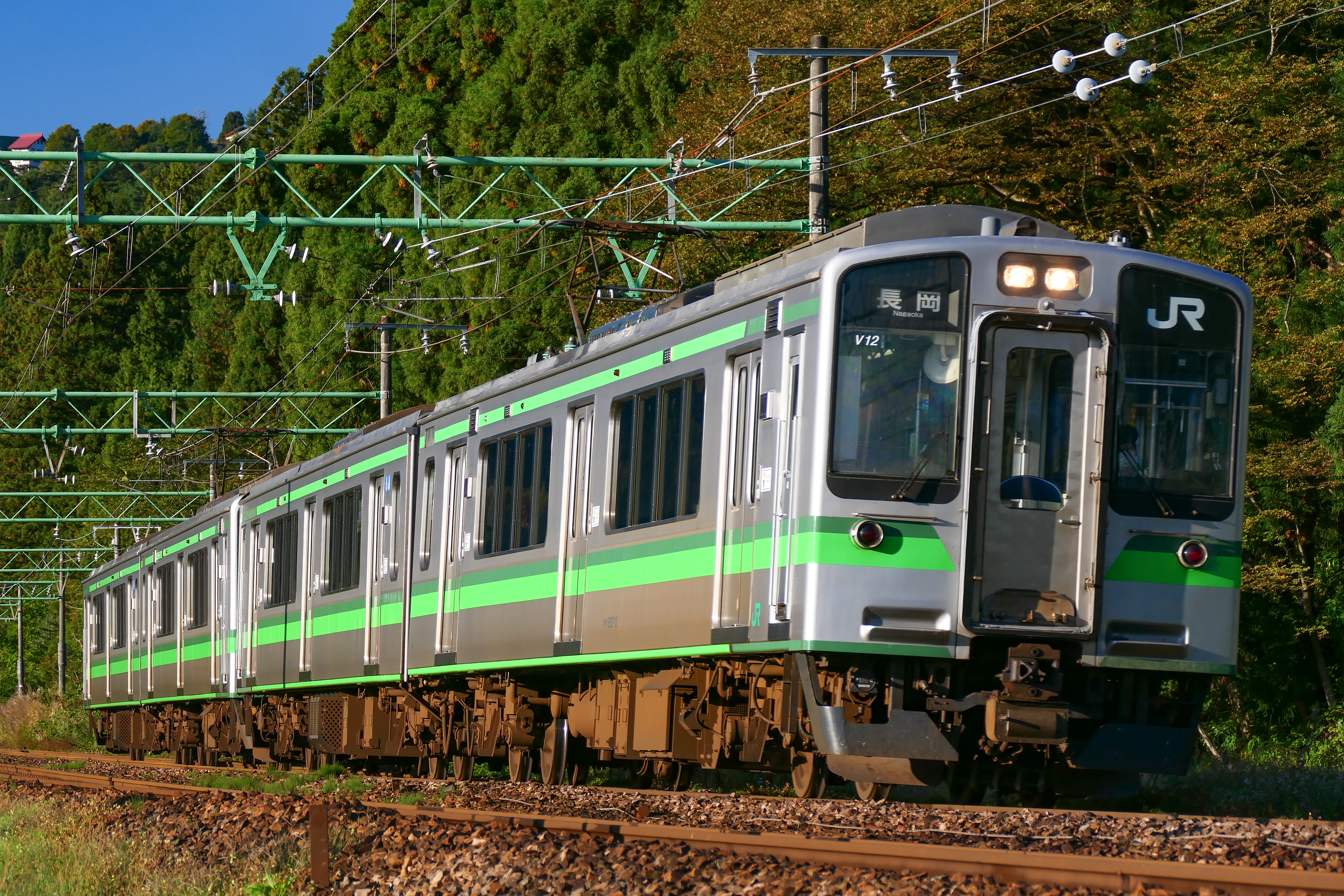
- Niigata-based E127 series set V12 in October 2022
- In service: 1995–present
- Manufacturers: JR East, Kawasaki Heavy Industries, Tokyu Car Corporation
- Constructed: 1995–1998
- Number built: 50 vehicles (25 sets)
- Number in service: 48 vehicles (24 sets) as of September 2023
- Number scrapped: 2 vehicles (set V3, accident damage)
- Formation: 2 cars per trainset
- Operators: JR East; Echigo TOKImeki (ET127)
- Depots: Niigata, Naoetsu, Matsumoto, Nakahara

Specifications
- Car body construction: Stainless steel
- Car length: 20,000 mm (65 ft 7 in)
- Width: 2,800 mm (9 ft 2 in)
- Doors: 3 pairs per side
- Maximum speed: 110 km/h (68 mph)
- Traction system: As built: Toyo Denki GTO-VVVF; Updated: Toyo Denki IGBT-VVVF
- Traction motors: MT71
- Power output: 120 kW (160 hp) per motor
- Electric systems: 1,500 V DC (overhead catenary)
- Current collection: Pantograph
- Safety systems: ATS-SN, ATS-P, ATS-Ps
- Track gauge: 1,067 mm (3 ft 6 in)

The E127 series (E127系) is a DC electric multiple unit (EMU) train type operated on local services by East Japan Railway Company (JR East) in Japan since 1995, and also by the third-sector railway operator Echigo Tokimeki Railway since March 2015 as the ET127 series. The design is derived from the 209 series commuter EMU.

== Variants ==
- E127-0 series: 13 × 2-car sets built for the Niigata area (originally used on Echigo Line, Hakushin Line, Uetsu Main Line)
- E127-100 series: 12 × 2-car sets for Matsumoto area (Oito Line, Shinonoi Line)
- ET127 series: 10 × former E127-0 series 2-car sets operated by Echigo Tokimeki Railway (ETR) since March 2015

All types use the same DT61A motor bogies and TR246A trailer bogies found on the 701 series EMUs.

== Operations ==
Operations as of March 2017 (E127-0, ET127)

As of 13 September 2023, E127 series train sets are used on the following lines.

- E127-0 series
  - Nambu Branch Line (Shitte – Hama-Kawasaki)
- E127-100 series
  - Oito Line (Matsumoto – Minami-Otari)
  - Shinetsu Main Line/Shinonoi Line (Nagano – Shiojiri)
  - Chuo Main Line (Shiojiri – Kobuchizawa, Shiojiri – Tatsuno – Okaya)
- ET127 series
  - Myoko Haneuma Line
  - Shinetsu Main Line (Naoetsu – Nagaoka)

=== Former operations ===
Operations as of July 2014 (E127-0)

- E127-0 series
  - Shinetsu Main Line (Nagaoka – Niigata) (until March 2015)
  - Hakushin Line (until March 2015)
  - Uetsu Main Line (Shibata – Murakami) (until March 2015)
  - Yahiko Line (until March 2022)
  - Echigo Line (Yoshida – Niigata) (until March 2022)
  - Joetsu Line (provisionally, 2022–2023)

== E127-0 series ==
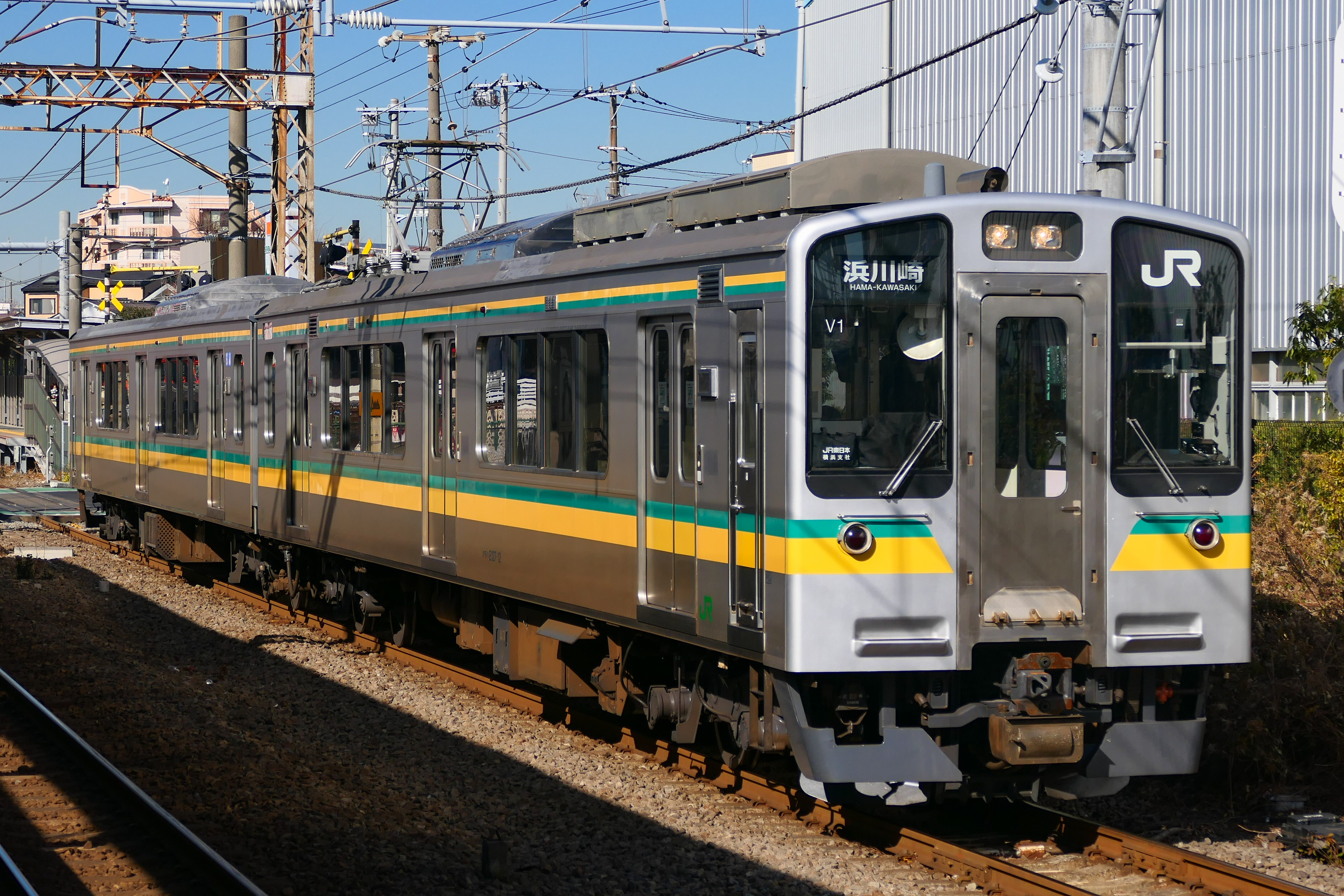
Nambu Branch Line E127-0 series set V1 in January 2024

Thirteen 2-car sets were built by Kawasaki Heavy Industries and Tokyu Car, and delivered to Niigata Depot in March 1995 (sets V1 to V6) and November 1996 (sets V7 to V13) for use on Echigo Line, Hakushin Line, and Uetsu Main Line local services. They entered service on 8 May 1995.

The sets can be coupled to form a six-car formation at maximum, and can be used on wanman driver only operation services.

On 14 March 2015, ten E127-0 series train sets were transferred to the third-sector railway operating company Echigo Tokimeki Railway for use on the renamed Myoko Haneuma Line and reclassified as ET127 series. Set V3 was withdrawn from service in October 2014, leaving just two sets, V12 and V13, in the ownership of JR East. These two sets were used mainly on Yahiko Line and Echigo Line services until March 2022. From 29 June of that year, however, the sets provisionally re-entered service on the Joetsu Line to compensate for train shortages brought on by a lightning strike that damaged five E129 series sets.

On 17 February 2023, JR East announced that the E127-0 series sets would be transferred from Niigata Depot to operate on Nambu Branch Line services. They were sent to Nagano for modification later that month. Set V12 was reallocated to Nakahara Depot and renumbered V1, and set V13 was renumbered V2. The sets entered service on the Nambu Branch Line from 13 September 2023.

=== Formation ===
As of 1 April 2016, two 2-car sets, V12 and V13, are in operation, based at Niigata Depot, formed as shown below, with one motored "Mc" car and one non-powered trailer "Tc" car.

Designation	Mc	Tc'
Numbering	KuMoHa E127-x	KuHa E126-x
Weight (t)	33.5	28.5
Capacity (total)	140	138

- The KuMoHa E127 car has one PS30 cross-arm type pantograph.
- The KuHa E126 car has a toilet and wheelchair space.

== E127-100 series ==
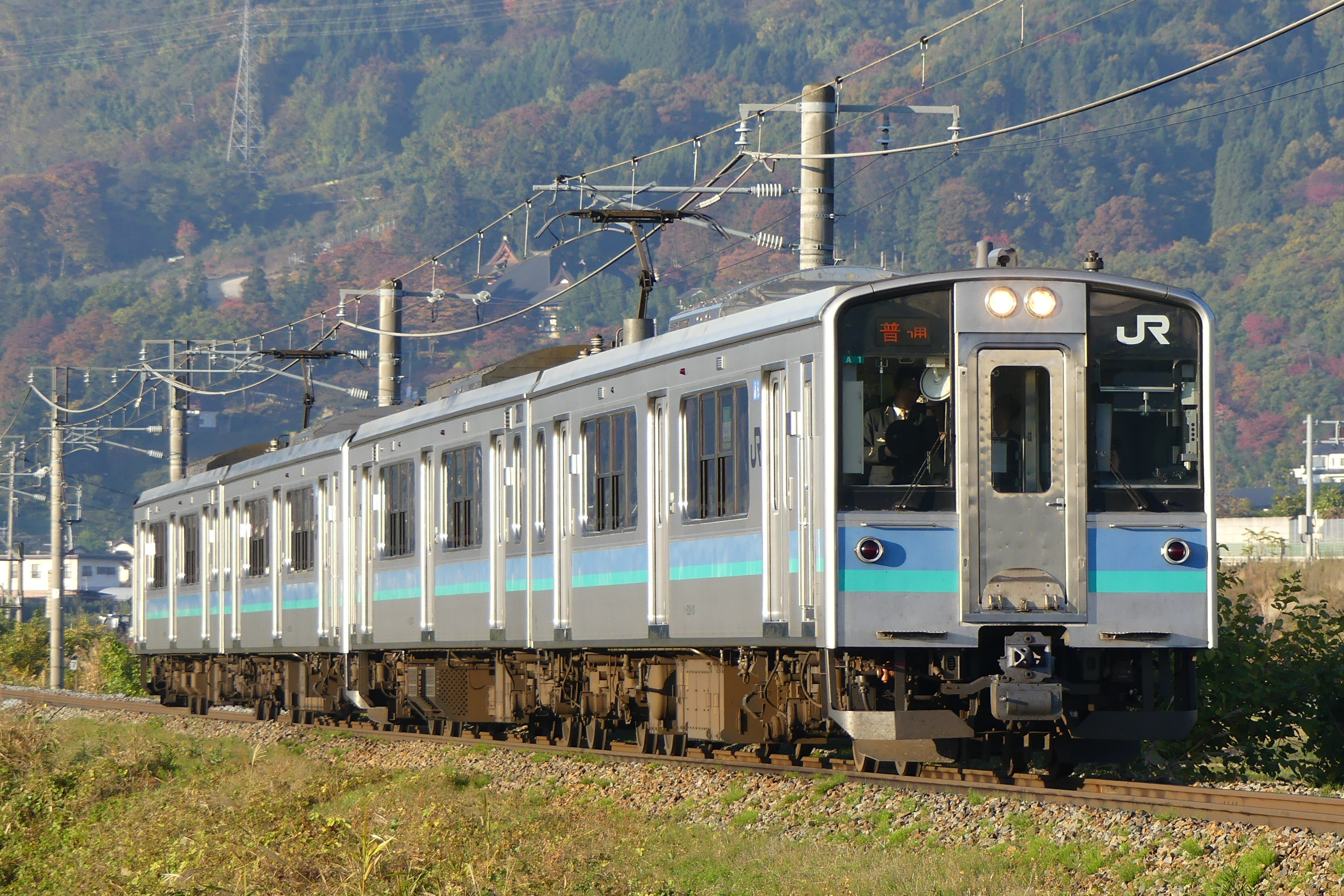
Matsumoto-based E127-100 series set A1 on the Shinonoi Line in November 2017

Twelve 2-car sets were built by Kawasaki Heavy Industries, JR East (Tsuchizaki Factory), and Tokyu Car, and delivered to Matsumoto Depot in November and December 1998 for use on Ōito Line and Shinonoi Line local services. They entered service on 8 December 1998. The external styling differs from the earlier E127-0 series, resembling the 701 series design. Sets A7 to A12 have a second de-icing pantograph on the KuHa trailer car.

=== Formation ===
As of 1 April 2016, twelve 2-car sets (A1 to A12) based at Matsumoto Depot, are in operation, and formed as shown below, with one motored "Mc" car and one non-powered trailer "Tc" car, and car 1 at the Matsumoto end.

Car No.	1	2
Designation	Mc	Tc'
Numbering	KuMoHa E127-1xx	KuHa E126-1xx

- Car 1 has one PS34 single-arm pantograph. (Also on car 2 for sets A7 to A12.)
- Car 2 has a toilet and wheelchair space.

=== Interior ===
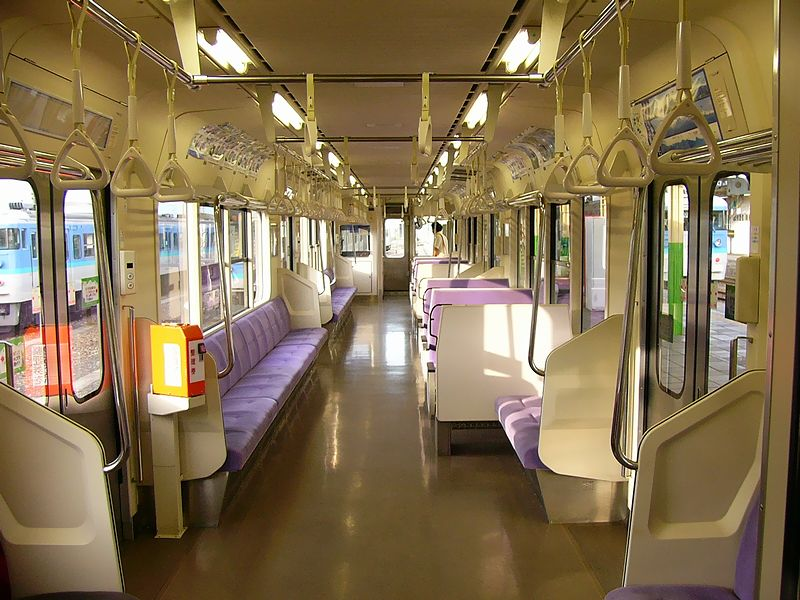
Interior view of E127-100 series set showing mixed longitudinal/transverse seating and driver-only-operation ticket issuing machine

== ET127 series ==
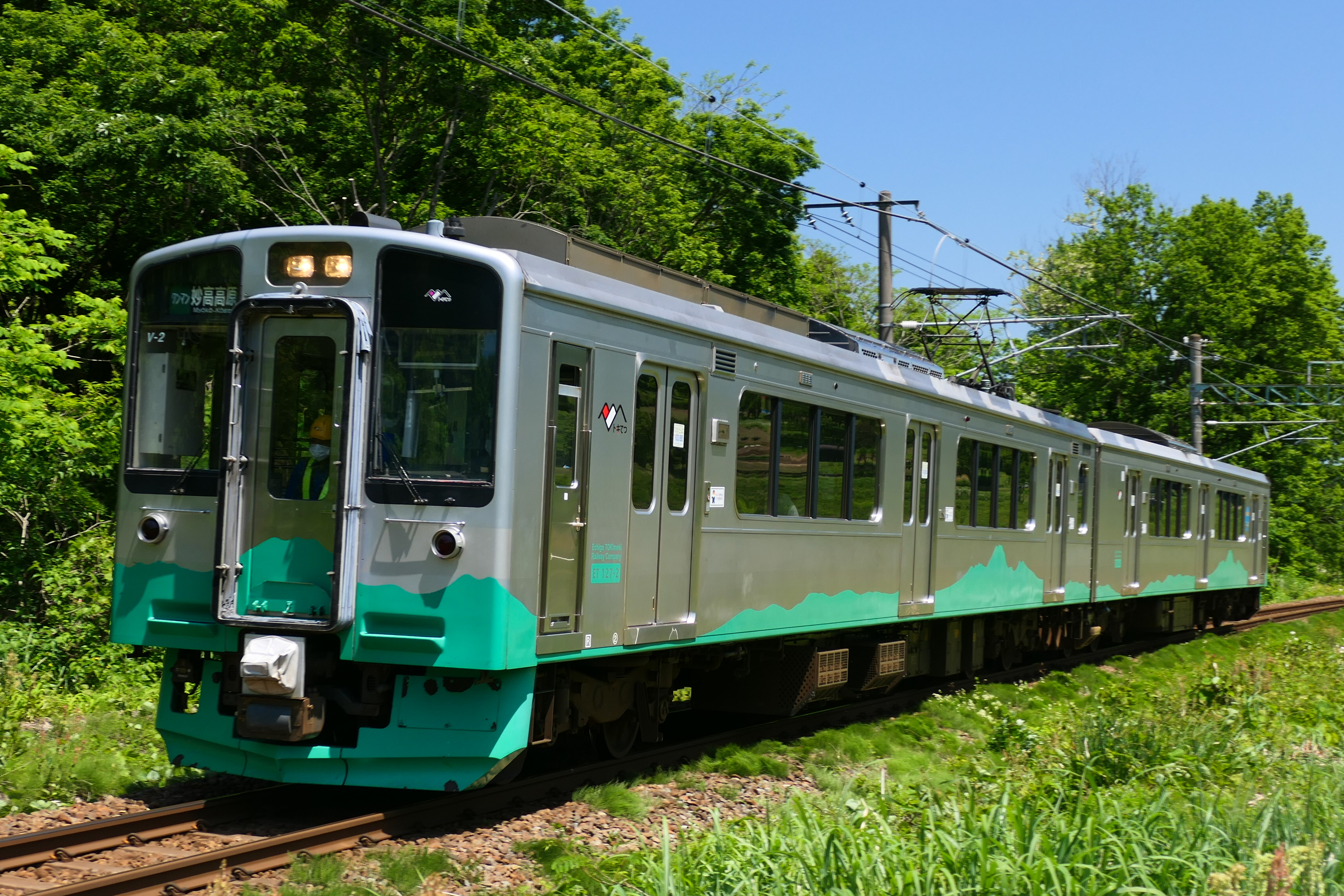
Echigo Tokimeki Railway ET127 series set V2 in ETR livery

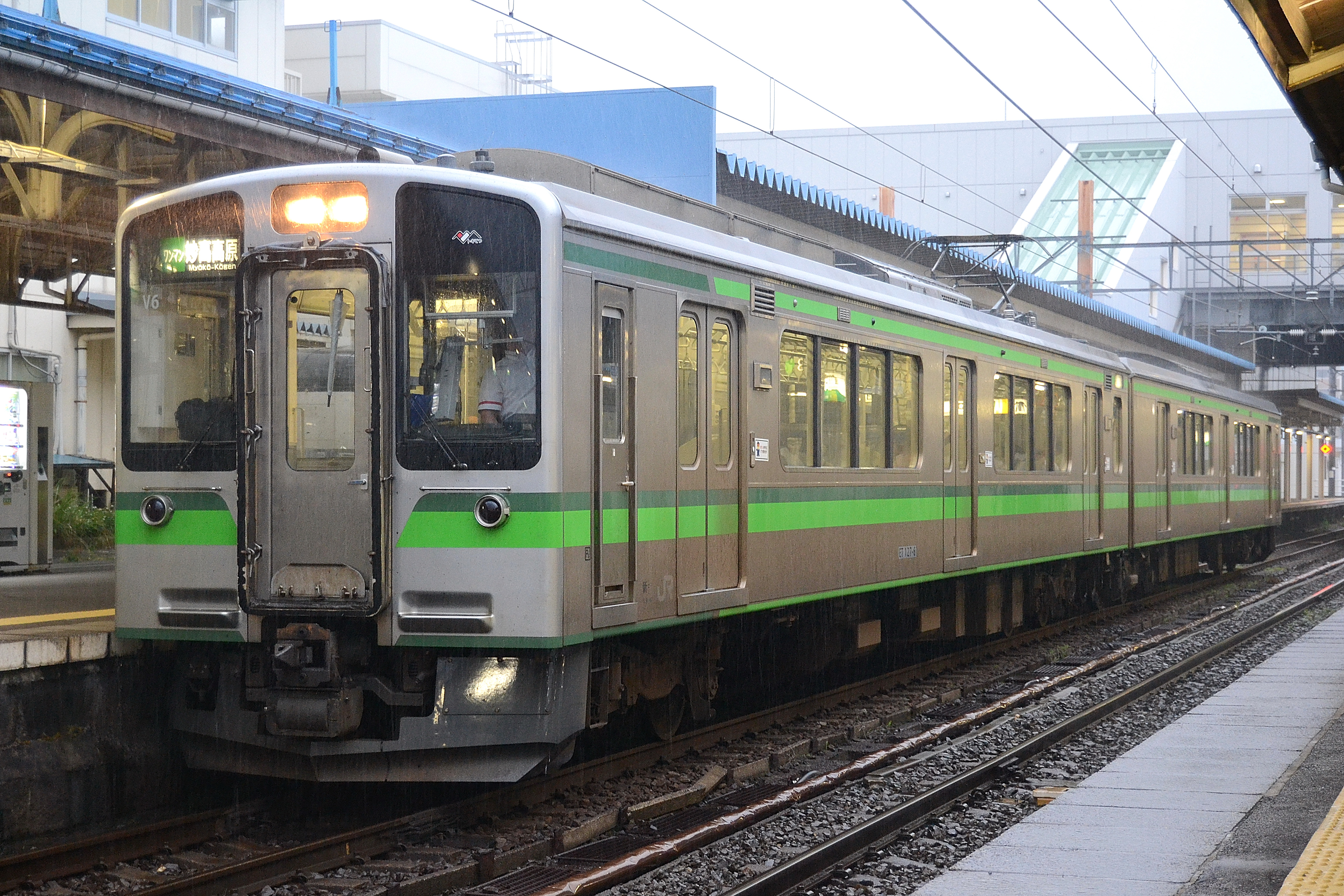
Echigo Tokimeki Railway ET127 series set V6 in JR East livery in June 2015

From 14 March 2015, ten former JR East E127-0 series train sets were transferred to the third-sector railway operating company Echigo Tokimeki Railway for use on the renamed Myoko Haneuma Line, which was a section of the original Shin'etsu Main Line. The train sets were reclassified as ET127 series.

=== Formation ===
As of 1 April 2016, Echigo Tokimeki Railway operates ten ET127 series two-car train sets, numbered from V1 to V10. The train sets are based at Naoetsu Depot.

One train set is configured to have one motored "Mc" car coupled with one non-powered trailer "Tc" car, as shown below:

Designation	Mc	Tc'
Numbering	ET127-x	ET126-x
Weight (t)	33.5	28.5
Capacity (total)	140	138

- The ET127 car has one cross-arm type pantograph.

== Build histories ==
The build histories of individual sets are as follows.

=== E127-0 series ===
Set No.	Manufacturer	Date delivered	Date withdrawn	Notes
V1	Kawasaki Heavy Industries	25 March 1995		Transferred to ETR March 2015
V2	Kawasaki Heavy Industries	25 March 1995		Transferred to ETR March 2015
V3	Kawasaki Heavy Industries	27 March 1995	20 October 2014	
V4	Kawasaki Heavy Industries	27 March 1995		Transferred to ETR March 2015 (→V3)
V5	Kawasaki Heavy Industries	29 March 1995		Transferred to ETR March 2015 (→V4)
V6	Kawasaki Heavy Industries	29 March 1995		Transferred to ETR March 2015 (→V5)
V7	Kawasaki Heavy Industries	20 November 1996		Transferred to ETR March 2015 (→V6)
V8	Kawasaki Heavy Industries	20 November 1996		Transferred to ETR March 2015 (→V7)
V9	Kawasaki Heavy Industries	21 November 1996		Transferred to ETR March 2015 (→V8)
V10	Kawasaki Heavy Industries	21 November 1996		Transferred to ETR March 2015 (→V9)
V11	Kawasaki Heavy Industries	22 November 1996		Transferred to ETR March 2015 (→V10)
V1 (Naha)	Tokyu Car	28 November 1996		Numbered V12 until May 2023
V2 (Naha)	Tokyu Car	28 November 1996		Numbered V13 until September 2023

=== E127-100 series ===
Set No.	Manufacturer	Date delivered
A1	Kawasaki Heavy Industries	7 November 1998
A2	Kawasaki Heavy Industries	7 November 1998
A3	Kawasaki Heavy Industries	21 November 1998
A4	Kawasaki Heavy Industries	21 November 1998
A5	Kawasaki Heavy Industries	24 November 1998
A6	Kawasaki Heavy Industries	24 November 1998
A7	Kawasaki Heavy Industries	28 November 1998
A8	Kawasaki Heavy Industries	28 November 1998
A9	JR East (Tsuchizaki)	18 November 1998
A10	JR East (Tsuchizaki)	11 December 1998
A11	Tokyu Car	16 November 1998
A12	Tokyu Car	16 November 1998
