= Echigo-Ōsaki Station =

Former railway station in Sanjō, Niigata Prefecture, Japan

Echigo-Ōsaki Station 越後大崎駅
- The site of the station in August 2016

General information
- Location: Higashi-Ōsaki 2-chōme, Sanjō, Niigata （三条市東大崎2丁目） Japan
- Coordinates: 37°37′16″N 138°59′28″E
- Operator: Japanese National Railways
- Line: Yahiko Line
- Distance: 19.4 km from Yahiko
- Platforms: 1 side platform
- Tracks: 1

History
- Opened: 31 July 1927
- Closed: 1 April 1985

Passengers
- FY1981: 105 daily

Former services
Preceding station	JNR	Following station
Higashi-Sanjō towards Yahiko	Yahiko Line	Ōura towards Echigo-Nagasawa
Location
- Location within JR Yahiko Line Location within Japan

Echigo-Ōsaki Station (越後大崎駅, Echigo-Ōsaki-eki) was a train station located in Sanjō, Niigata, Japan.

== Lines ==
- Japanese National Railways
  - Yahiko Line (Closed section)

== History ==
The station was opened on July 31, 1927, and closed on April 1, 1985.
