= Yahiko Line =

Railway line in Niigata prefecture, Japan

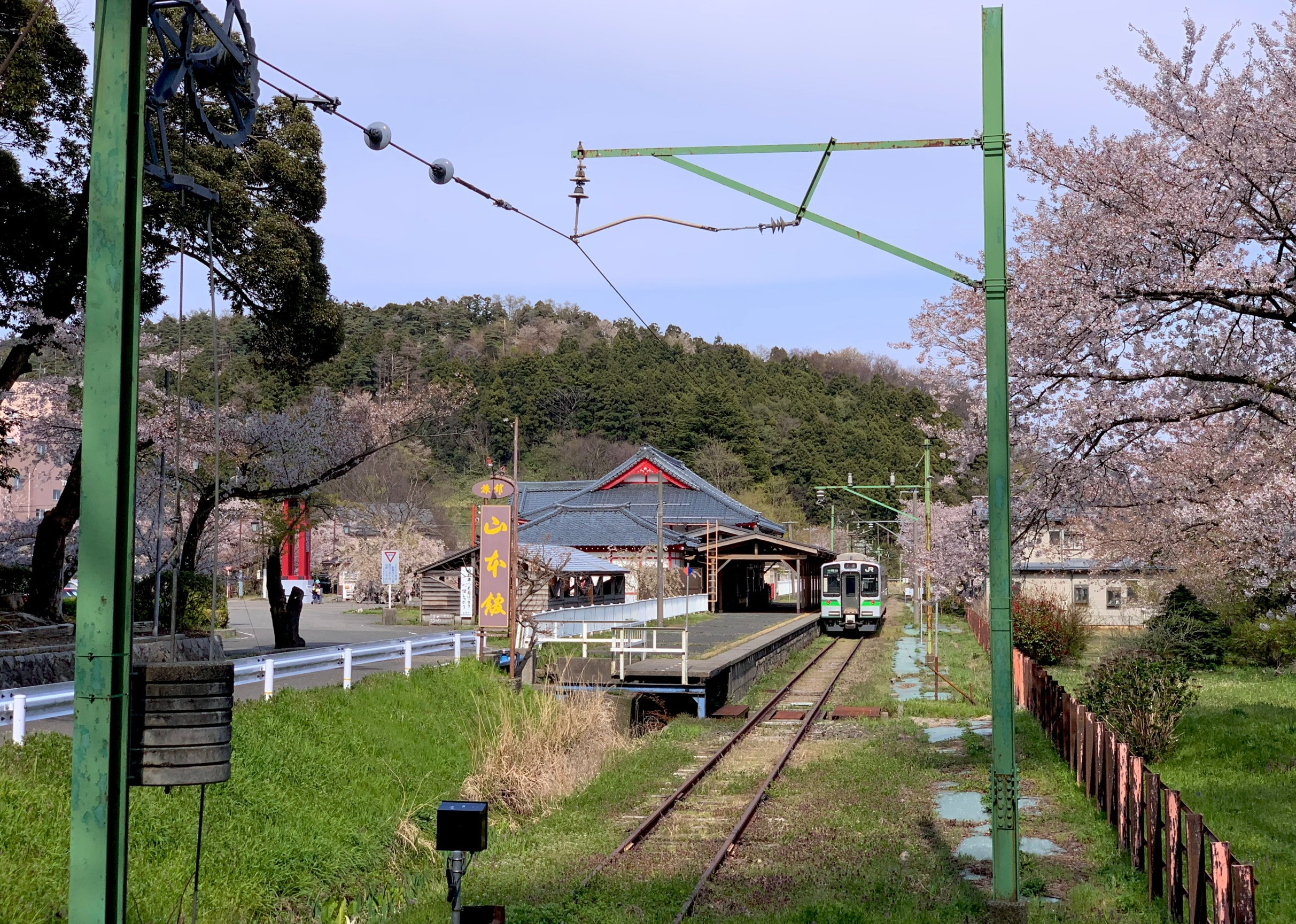
- An E127 series EMU at Yahiko Station

Overview
- Native name: 弥彦線
- Owner: JR East
- Locale: Niigata Prefecture
- Termini: Higashi-Sanjō; Yahiko
- Stations: 8

Service
- Type: Regional rail
- Rolling stock: E129 series

History
- Opened: 1916; 109 years ago

Technical
- Line length: 17.4 km (10.8 mi)
- Track gauge: 1,067 mm (3 ft 6 in)
- Electrification: 1,500 V DC overhead catenary
- Operating speed: 85 km/h (55 mph)

The Yahiko Line (弥彦線, Yahiko-sen) is a Japanese railway line operated by East Japan Railway Company (JR East) which connects Yahiko Station in the village of Yahiko and Higashi-Sanjō Station in the city of Sanjo, both in Niigata Prefecture. The line shares its name with both Yahiko Village and nearby Mt. Yahiko.

Line map

== Services ==
All trains on the line operate as local services stopping at all stations. Most services run between Yahiko and Yoshida, and Yoshida and Higashi-Sanjō. A few services run the full length of the line from Yahiko to Higashi-Sanjō, and one service in the mornings in both directions runs through to the Echigo Line toward Teradomari. There is an hourly service in the mornings and evenings, and service every 2–3 hours during the mid-day.

== Stations ==
Stations of Yahiko Line

Name	Japanese	Distance (km)	Transfers		Location	
Yahiko	弥彦	0.0		｜	Yahiko	Niigata Prefecture
Yahagi	矢作	2.3		｜	Yahiko	Niigata Prefecture
Yoshida	吉田	4.9	■Echigo Line	◇	Tsubame	Niigata Prefecture
Nishi-Tsubame	西燕	8.0		｜	Tsubame	Niigata Prefecture
Tsubame	燕	10.3		◇	Tsubame	Niigata Prefecture
Tsubame-Sanjō	燕三条	12.9	Joetsu Shinkansen	｜	Sanjō	Niigata Prefecture
Kita-Sanjō	北三条	15.4		｜	Sanjō	Niigata Prefecture
Higashi-Sanjō	東三条	17.4	■Shinetsu Main Line	◇	Sanjō	Niigata Prefecture
Echigo-Ōsaki	越後大崎	19.4	Closed 1985	｜	Sanjō	Niigata Prefecture
Ōura	大浦	22.4	Closed 1985	｜	Sanjō	Niigata Prefecture
Echigo-Nagasawa	越後長沢	25.3	Closed 1985	｜	Sanjō	Niigata Prefecture

Symbols:

- | - Single-track
- ◇ - Single-track; station where trains can pass

== Rolling stock ==
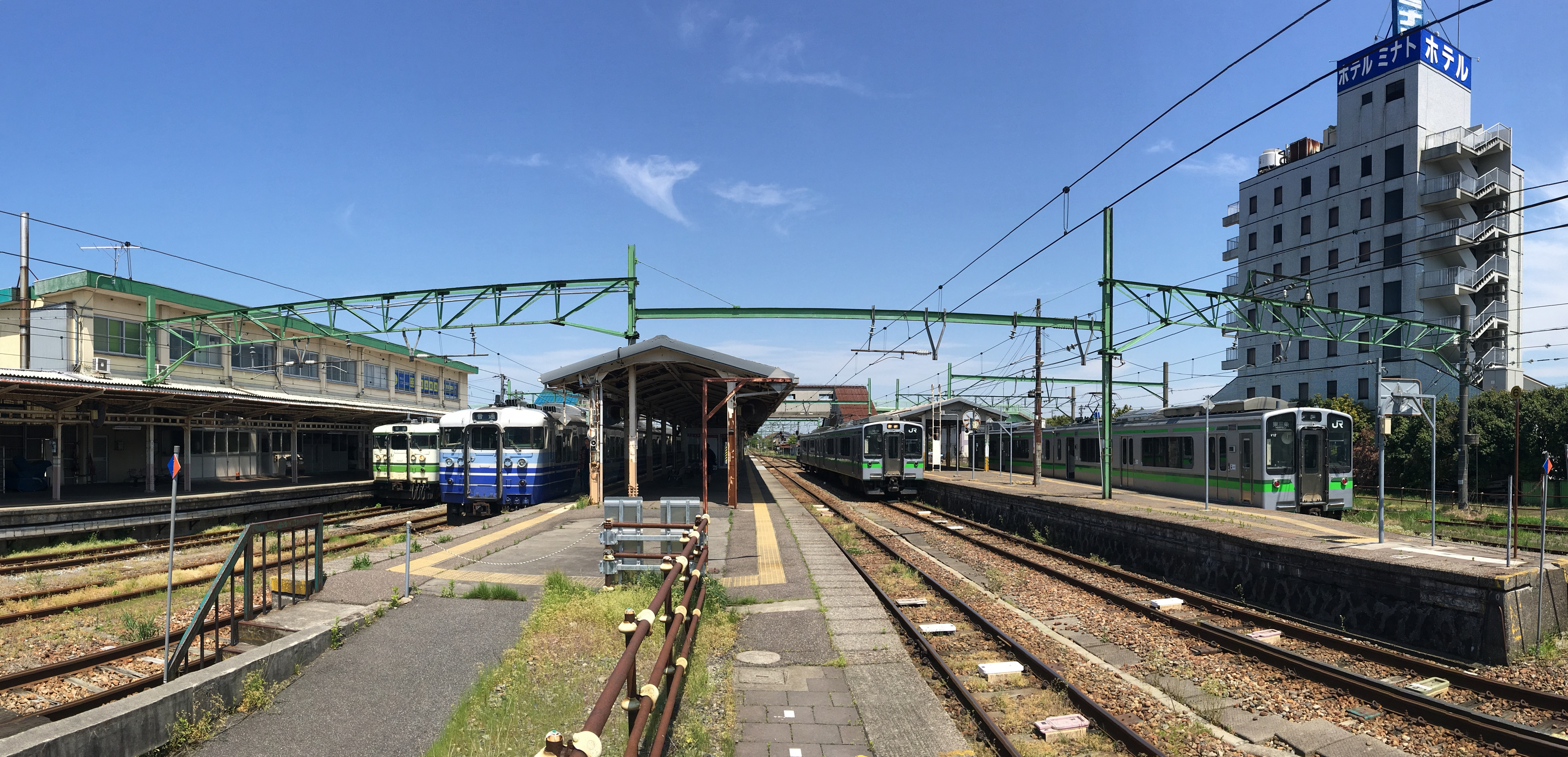
E127 series EMUs and 115-1000 series EMUs at Yoshida Station

- E129 series 2/4-car EMUs (since March 2015)

New E129 series EMUs were introduced on local services on the line from fiscal 2014.

=== Former ===
- 115-500 series 2 car EMUs (until March 2015)
- 115-1000 series 3-car EMUs (until 11 March 2022)
- E127 series 2-car EMUs (from March 2015 to 11 March 2022)
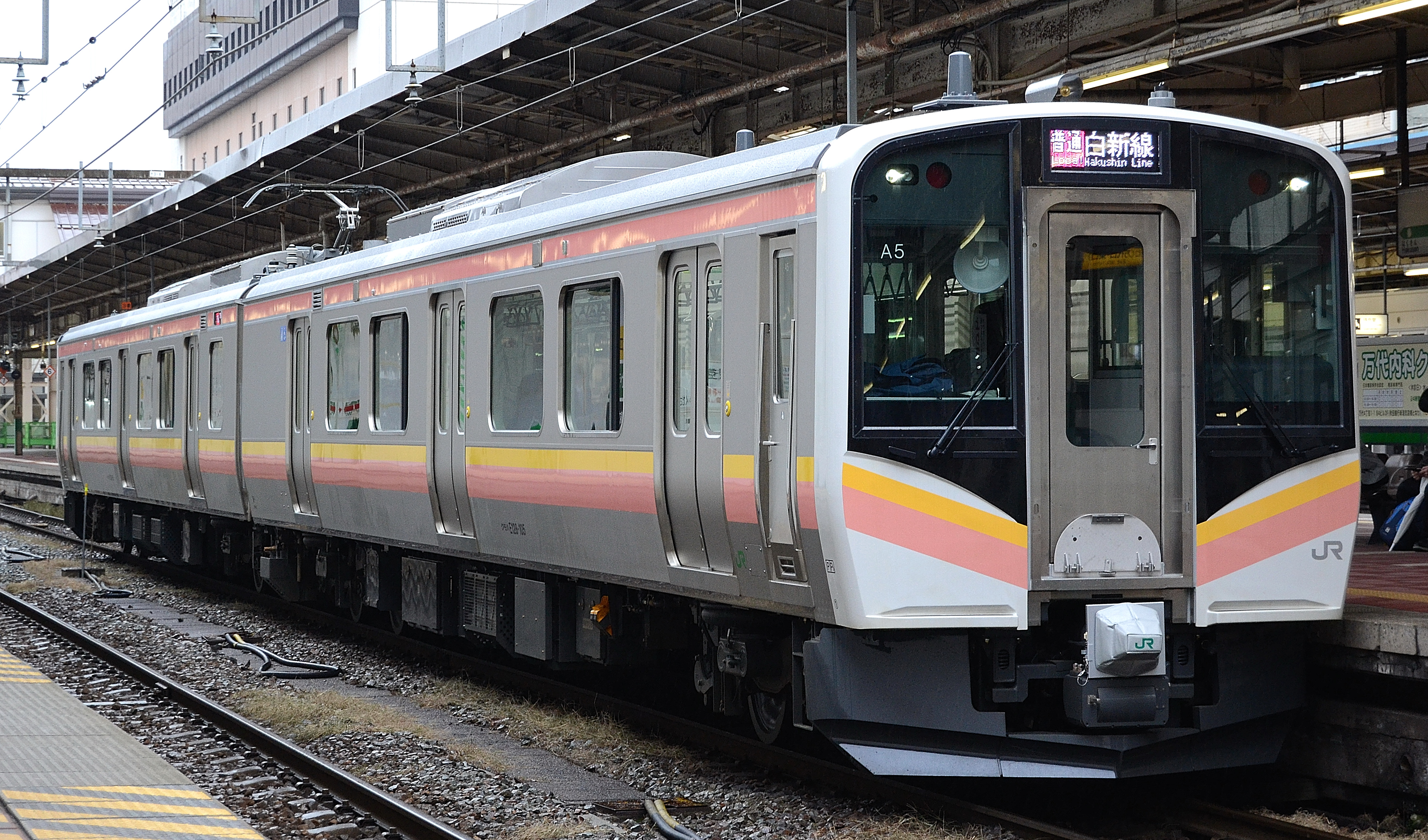
E129 series

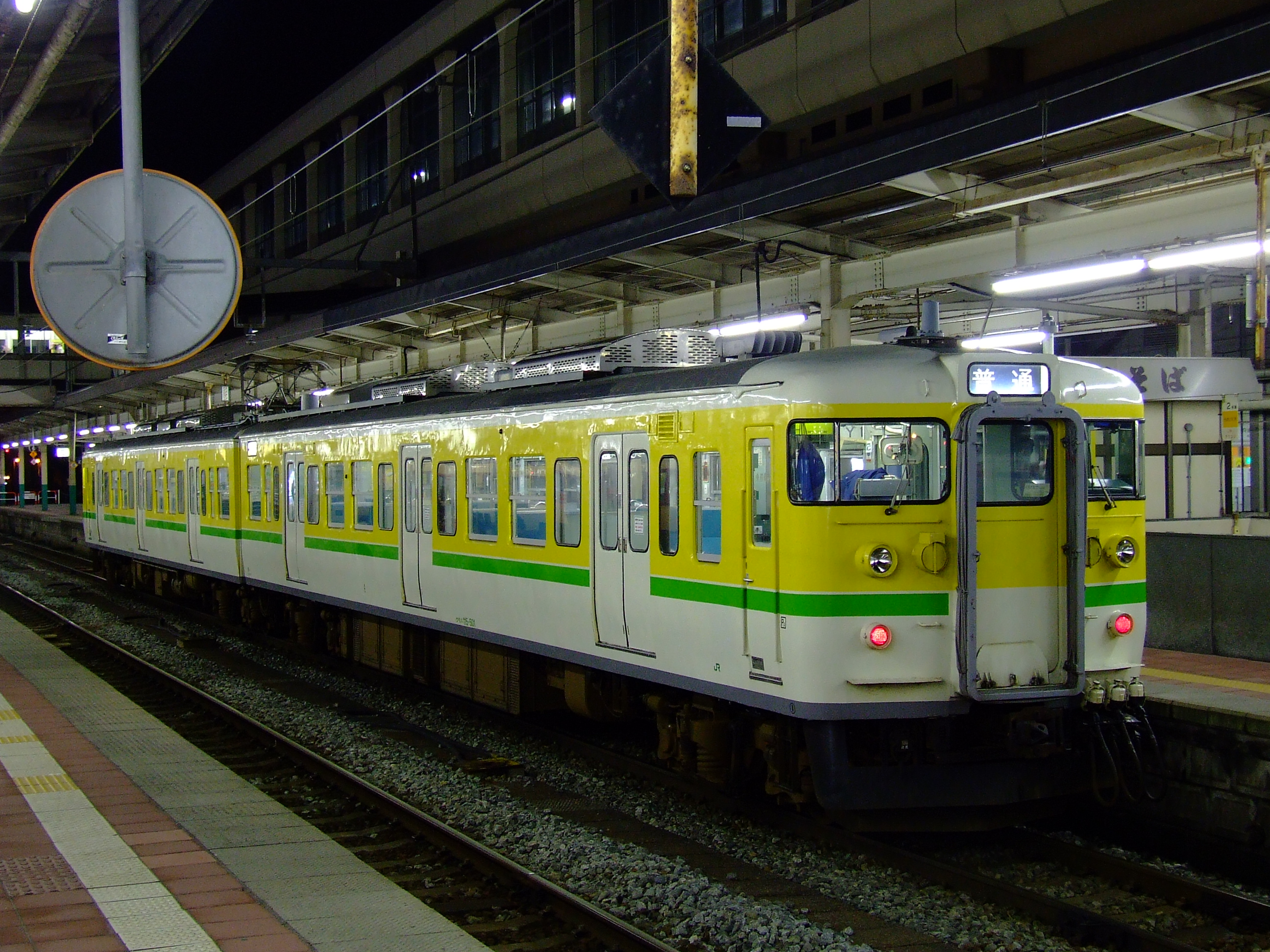
115-500 series

== History ==
The Echigo Railway opened the Yahiko to Yoshida section in 1916 and extended the line to Higashi-Sanjo in 1926. The company was nationalised in 1927.

Freight services ceased in 1960, and the line was electrified in 1984.

=== Former connecting lines ===
- Tsubame Station: The Niigata Kotsu opened a 34 km line electrified at 1,500 V DC to Sekiya on the Echigo Line in 1933. Freight services ceased in 1982, and the line closed between 1993 and 1999.
- Higashi-Sanjo station: An 8 km line to Echigo Nagasawa operated between 1927 and 1985.
