= Tsubame-Sanjō Station =

Railway station in Sanjō, Niigata Prefecture, Japan

Tsubame-Sanjō Station 燕三条駅
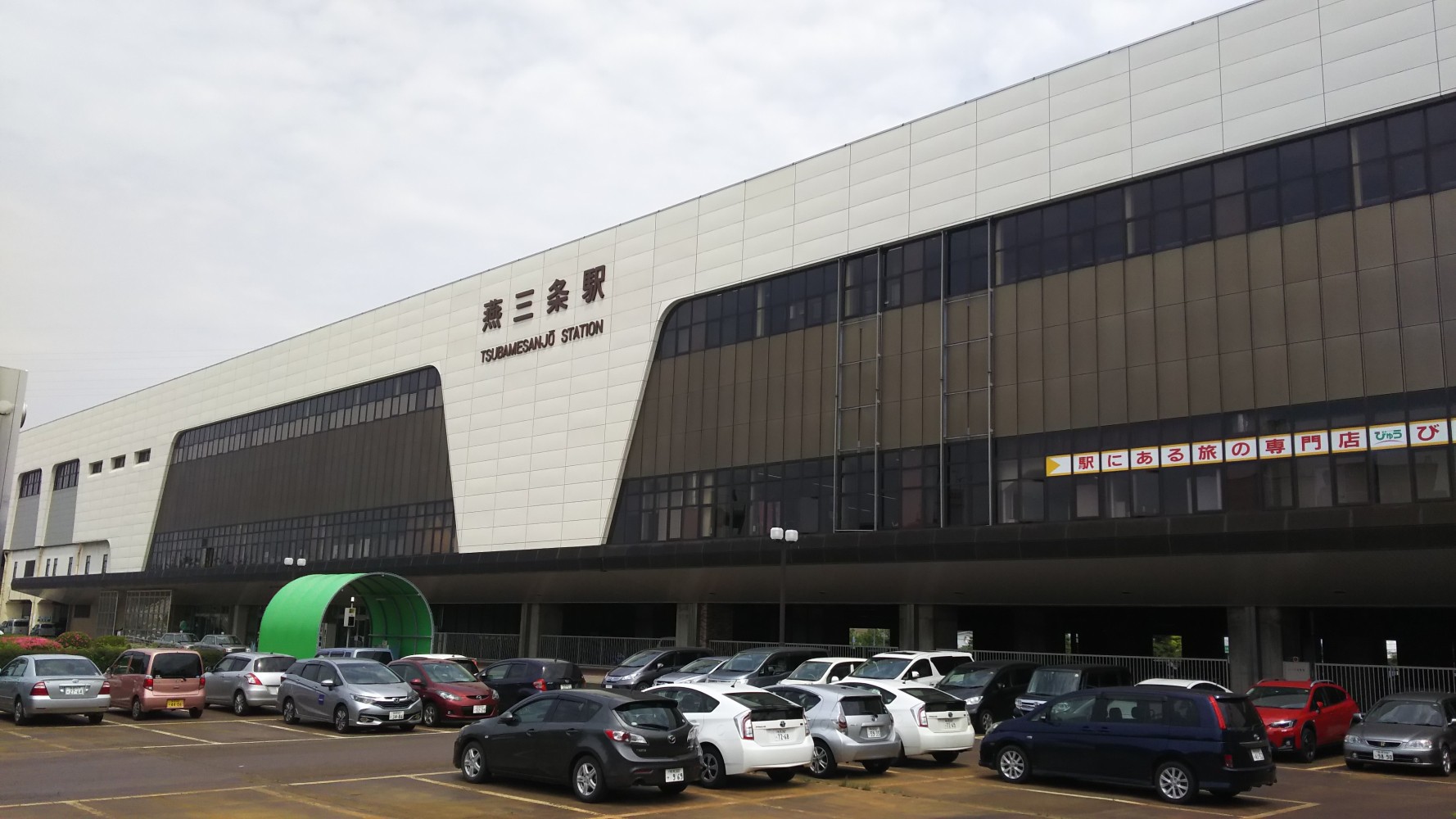
- Tsubame City side of Tsubame-Sanjō Station

Japanese name
- Shinjitai: 燕三条駅
- Kyūjitai: 燕三條驛
- Hiragana: つばめさんじょうえき

General information
- Location: 497 Shimosugoro, Sanjō City, Niigata Prefecture 955-0093; Japan
- Coordinates: 37.6477088°N 138.9387274°E
- Operator: JR East
- Lines: Jōetsu Shinkansen; Yahiko Line
- Distance: 293.8 km (182.6 mi) from Tokyo
- Platforms: 1 island + 1 side platform (Shinkansen); 1 side platform (Yahiko Line)
- Tracks: 4 (3 Shinkansen)

Construction
- Structure type: Elevated (Shinkansen); 1 (conventional)

Other information
- Status: Staffed (Midori no Madoguchi )
- Website: Official website

History
- Opened: 15 November 1982; 43 years ago

Passengers
- FY2017: 2,285 daily

Services
Preceding station	JR East	Following station
Nagaoka towards Tokyo	Jōetsu Shinkansen Toki	Niigata Terminus
Tsubame towards Yahiko	Yahiko Line	Kita-Sanjō towards Higashi-Sanjō
Location
- Location within JR Yahiko Line Location within Niigata Prefecture Location within Chubu region Location within Japan

Tsubame-Sanjō Station (燕三条駅, Tsubame-Sanjō-eki) is a railway station in the city of Sanjō, Niigata, Japan, operated by East Japan Railway Company (JR East). The station sits directly on the border of the cities of Sanjō and Tsubame. As the station headquarters are located on the Sanjō side of the station, Tsubame-Sanjō Station is considered to be in Sanjō. The station is located 293.8 kilometers from Tokyo.

== Lines ==
Tsubame-Sanjō Station is served by the high-speed Jōetsu Shinkansen line between Tokyo and Niigata, and also by the Yahiko Line.

== Station layout ==
The station has one elevated island platform and one side platform for the Jōetsu Shinkansen, and one ground-level side platform for the Yahiko Line, which is at a right angle to the Shinkansen platforms. The station building is located above the Yahiko Line platform and underneath the Shinkansen platforms.

The station has a Midori no Madoguchi staffed ticket office. Suica farecards can be used at this station.

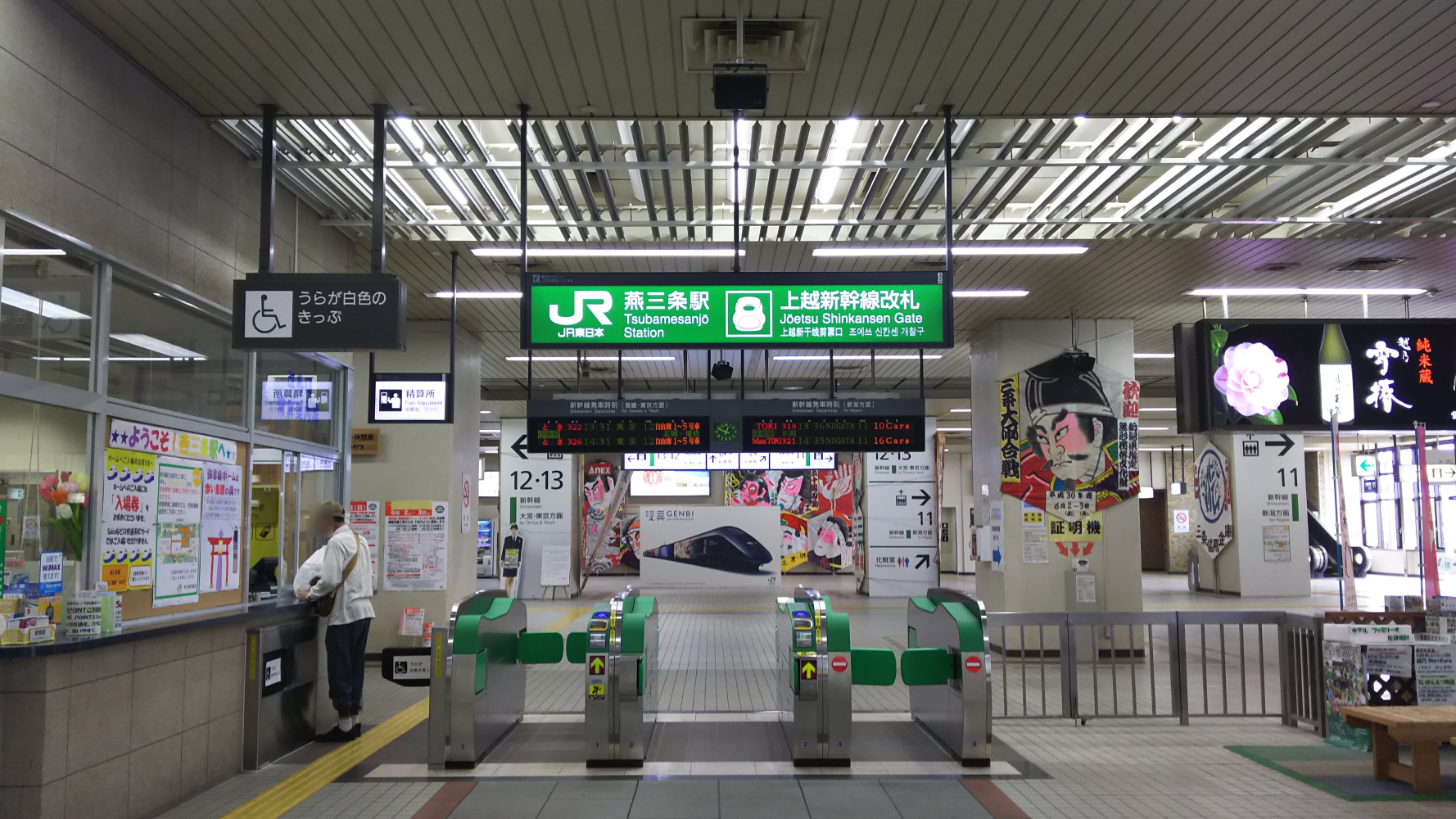
The Jōetsu Shinkansen ticket barriers at Tsubame-Sanjō Station

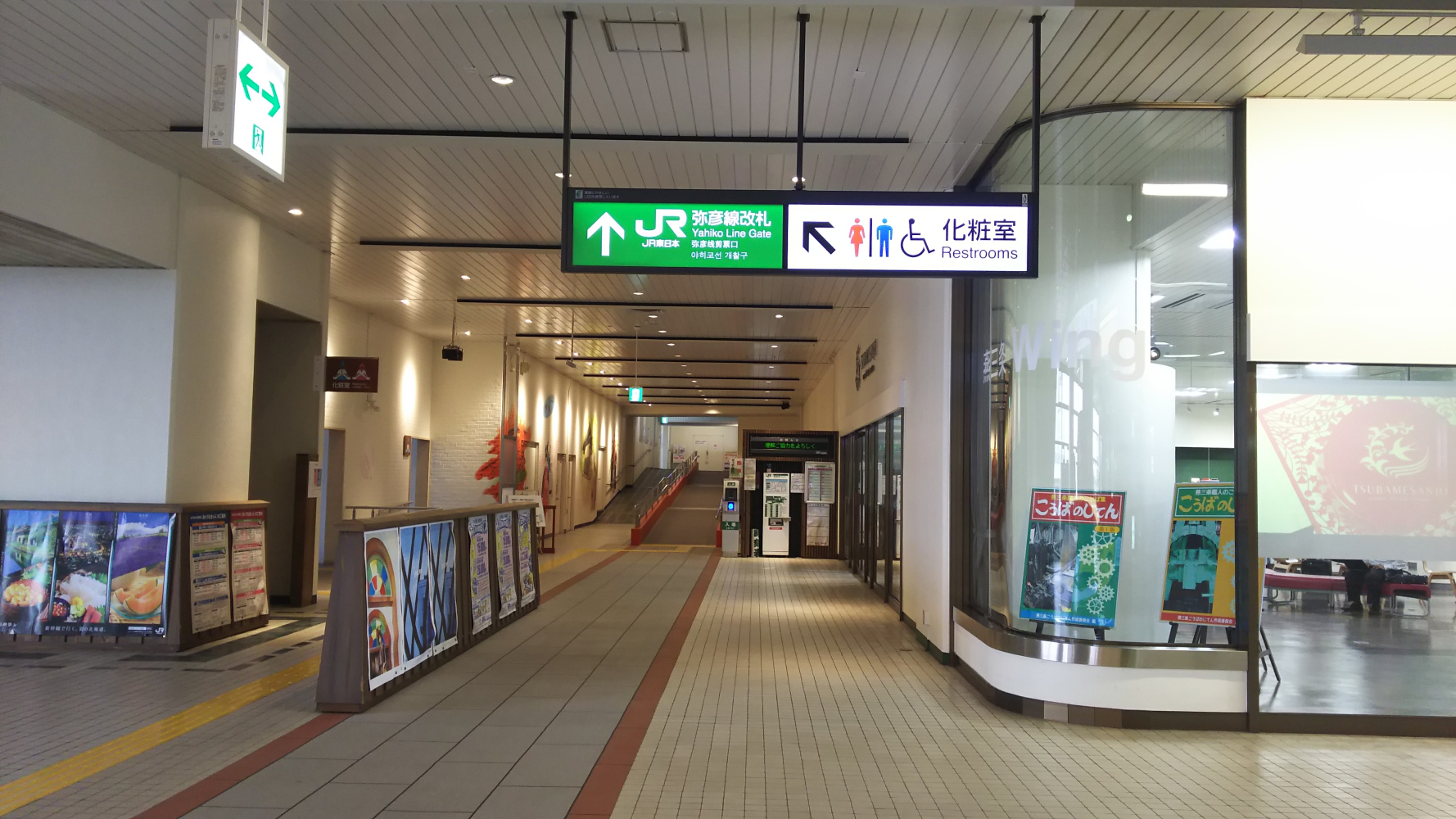
The Yahiko Line ticket barriers at Tsubame-Sanjō Station

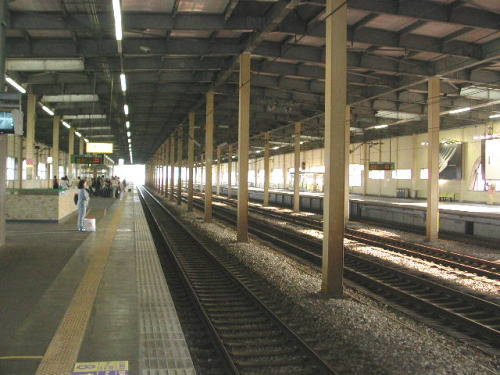
Platform of Jōetsu Shinkansen

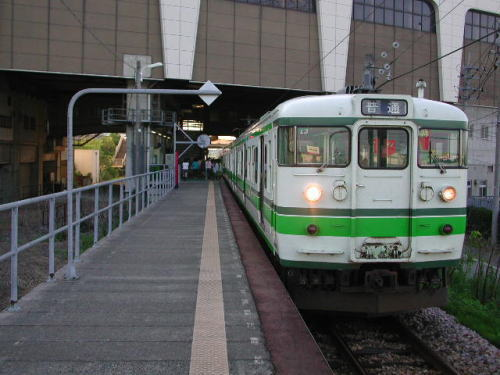
Platform of Yahiko Line

=== Platforms ===
(Unnumbered)	■ Yahiko Line	for Higashi-Sanjō and Yahiko (bidirectional)
11	■ Jōetsu Shinkansen	for Niigata
12/13	■ Jōetsu Shinkansen	for Echigo-Yuzawa and Tokyo

== History ==
The station opened on 15 November 1982.

== Passenger statistics ==
In fiscal 2017, the station was used by an average of 2285 passengers daily (boarding passengers only).

== Surrounding area ==
Tsubame-Sanjō Station offers access to the Yahiko Shrine via the Yahiko Line. The shrine, located in the town of Yahiko, was the ichinomiya, or highest shrine, of the ancient Echigo Province, and has numerous Important Cultural Properties of Japan.

== See also ==
- List of railway stations in Japan
