= Higashi-Sanjō Station =

Railway station in Sanjō, Niigata Prefecture, Japan

Higashi-Sanjō Station 東三条駅
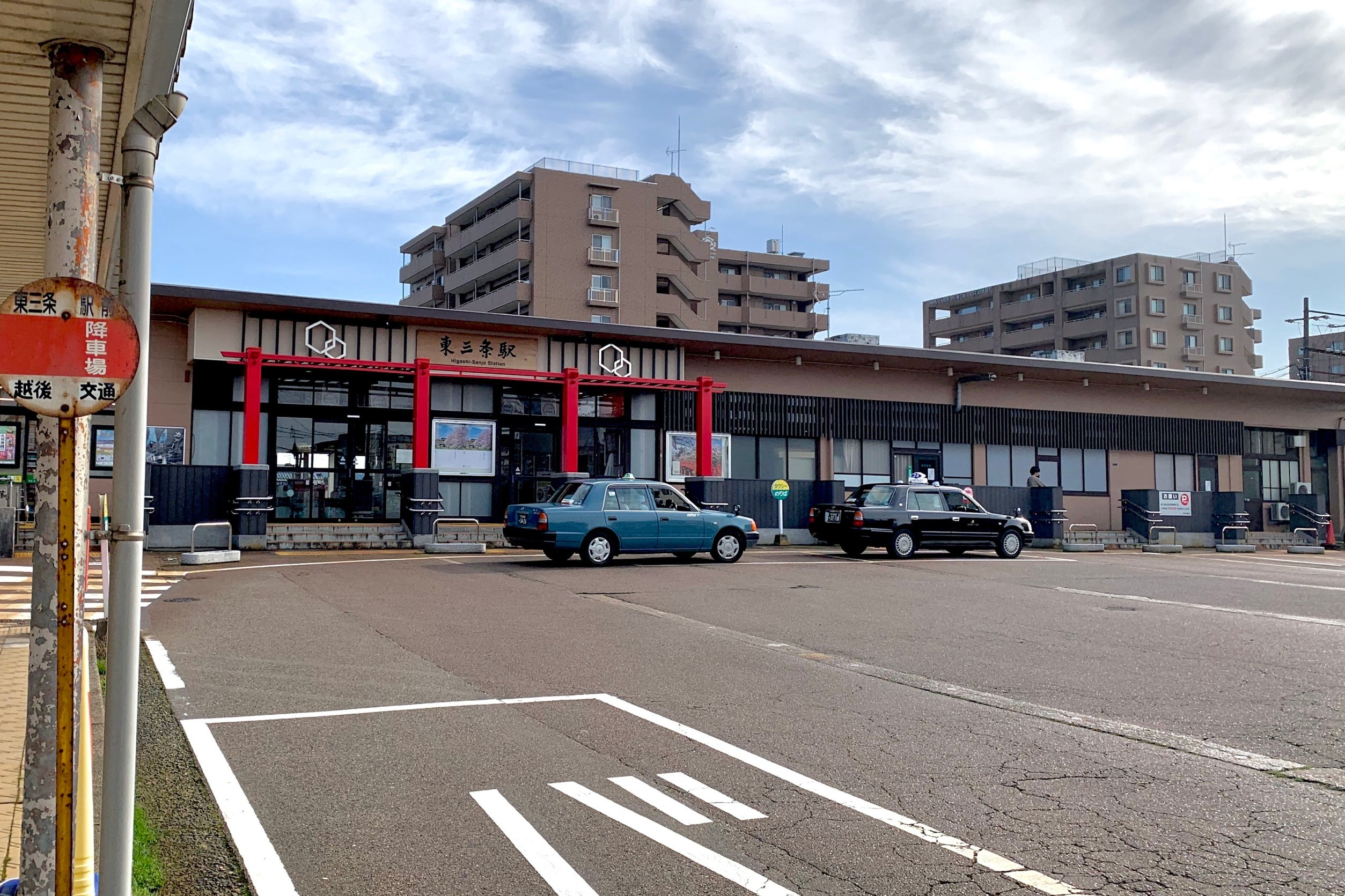
- West side of Higashi-Sanjō Station in March 2020

General information
- Location: 1 Higashi-Sanjō, Sanjō-shi, Niigata-ken 955-0047; Japan
- Coordinates: 37.6286°N 138.9736°E
- Operator: JR East
- Lines: ■ Shinetsu Main Line; ■ Yahiko Line
- Distance: 96.2 km from Naoetsu
- Platforms: 1 side + 1 island platform
- Tracks: 4

Other information
- Status: Staffed (Midori no Madoguchi)
- Website: Official website

History
- Opened: 20 November 1897; 128 years ago
- Former names: Ichinokido Station (until 1926)

Passengers
- FY2017: 2,733 (daily)

Services
| Preceding station | JR East | Following station |
|---|---|---|
| Mitsuke towards Naoetsu | Shirayuki | Kamo towards Niigata |
| Sanjō towards Naoetsu | Shin'etsu Main Line Rapid | Kamo towards Niigata |
| Sanjō towards Naoetsu | Shin'etsu Main Line Local | Honai towards Niigata |
| Kita-Sanjō towards Yahiko | Yahiko Line | Terminus |
Former services
| Preceding station | JNR | Following station |
|---|---|---|
| Kita-Sanjō towards Yahiko | Yahiko Line | Echigo-Ōsaki towards Echigo-Nagasawa |
Location
- Location within JR Shinetsu Main Line Location within JR Yahiko Line Location within Japan

Higashi-Sanjō Station (東三条駅, Higashi-Sanjō-eki) is a railway station in the city of Sanjō, Niigata, Japan, operated by East Japan Railway Company (JR East).

== Lines ==
Higashi-Sanjō Station is served by the Shinetsu Main Line, and is 96.2 kilometers from the terminus of the line at Naoetsu Station. It is also a terminus of the Yahiko Line, and is 17.4 kilometers from the opposing terminus of the line at Yahiko Station.

== Station layout ==
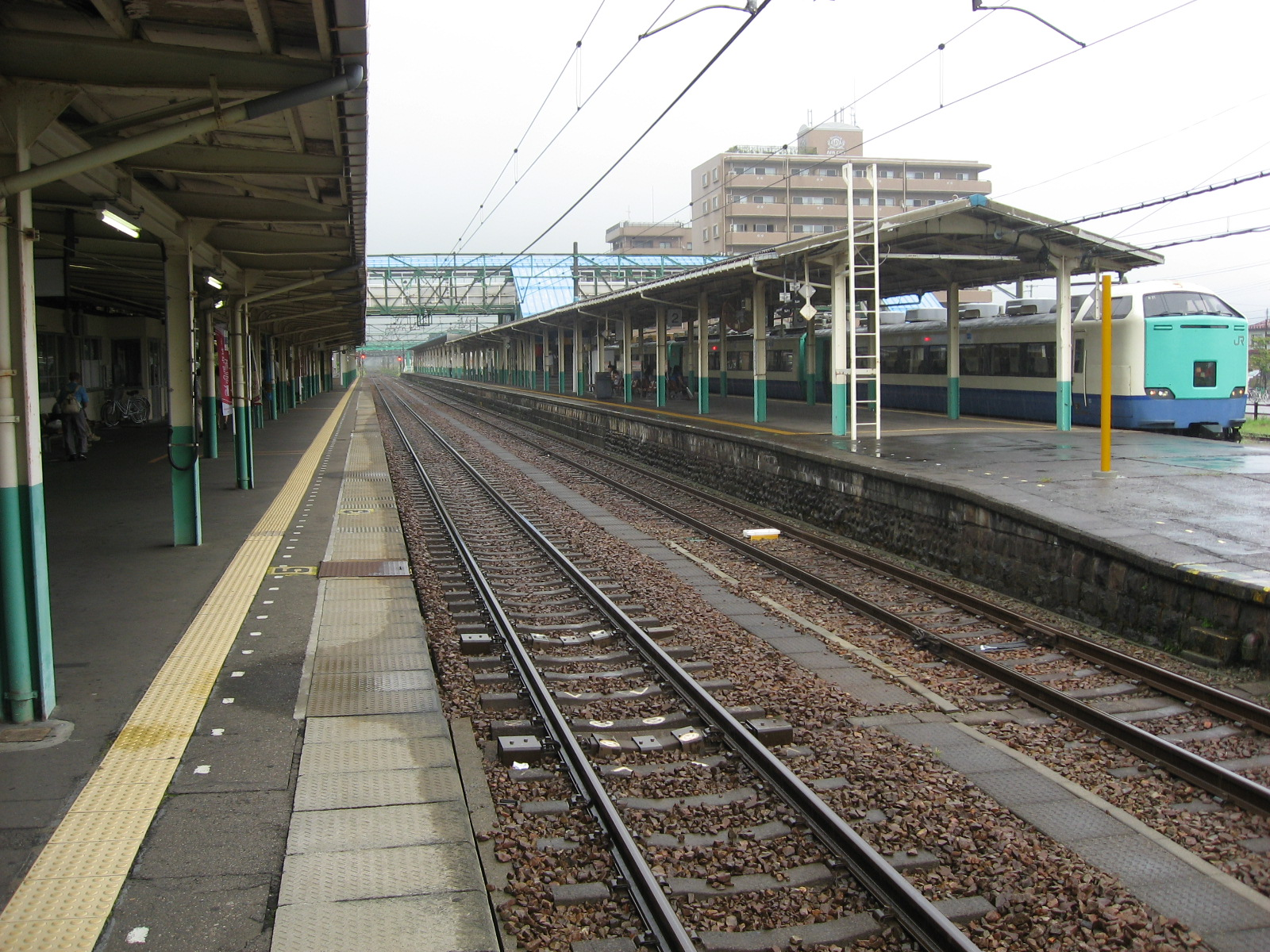
Platforms

The station consists of one ground-level side platform, which has a partial cut-out, and a single island platform connected by a footbridge, serving four tracks. The station has a Midori no Madoguchi staffed ticket office.

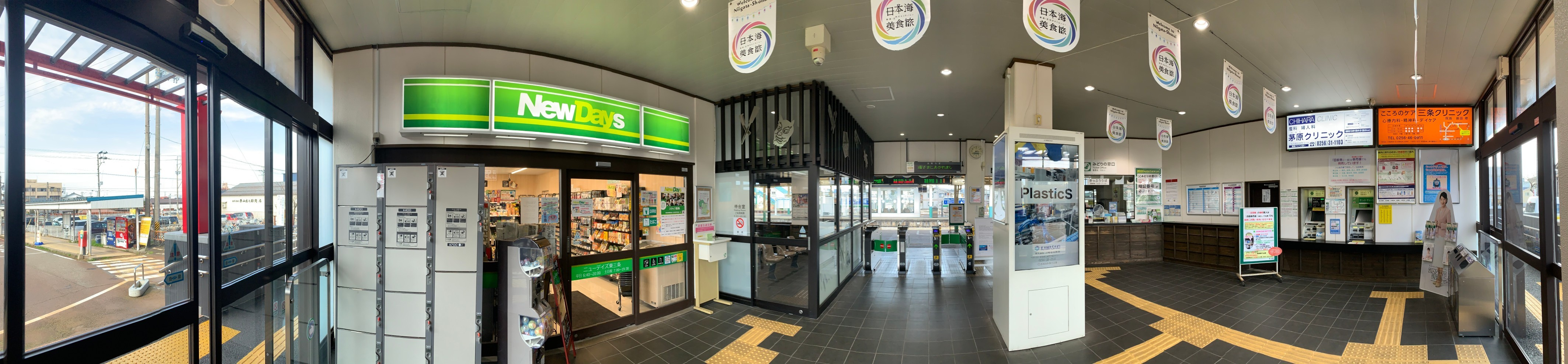
Station interior, March 2020

=== Platforms ===
| 0 | ■ Yahiko Line | for Tsubame-Sanjō and Yahiko |
| 1 | ■ Shinetsu Main Line | for Niitsu and Niigata |
| 2 | ■ Shinetsu Main Line | for starting trains during peak hours |
| 3 | ■ Shinetsu Main Line | for Nagaoka |

== History ==
The station opened on 20 November 1897 as Ichinokido Station (一ノ木戸駅). It was renamed Higashi-Sanjō on 15 August 1926. With the privatization of Japanese National Railways (JNR) on 1 April 1987, the station came under the control of JR East.

== Passenger statistics ==
In fiscal 2017, the station was used by an average of 2733 passengers daily (boarding passengers only).

== Surrounding area ==
- Sanjō City Hall

== See also ==
- List of railway stations in Japan
