= Yahiko Station =

Railway station in Yahiko, Niigata Prefecture, Japan

Yahiko Station 弥彦駅
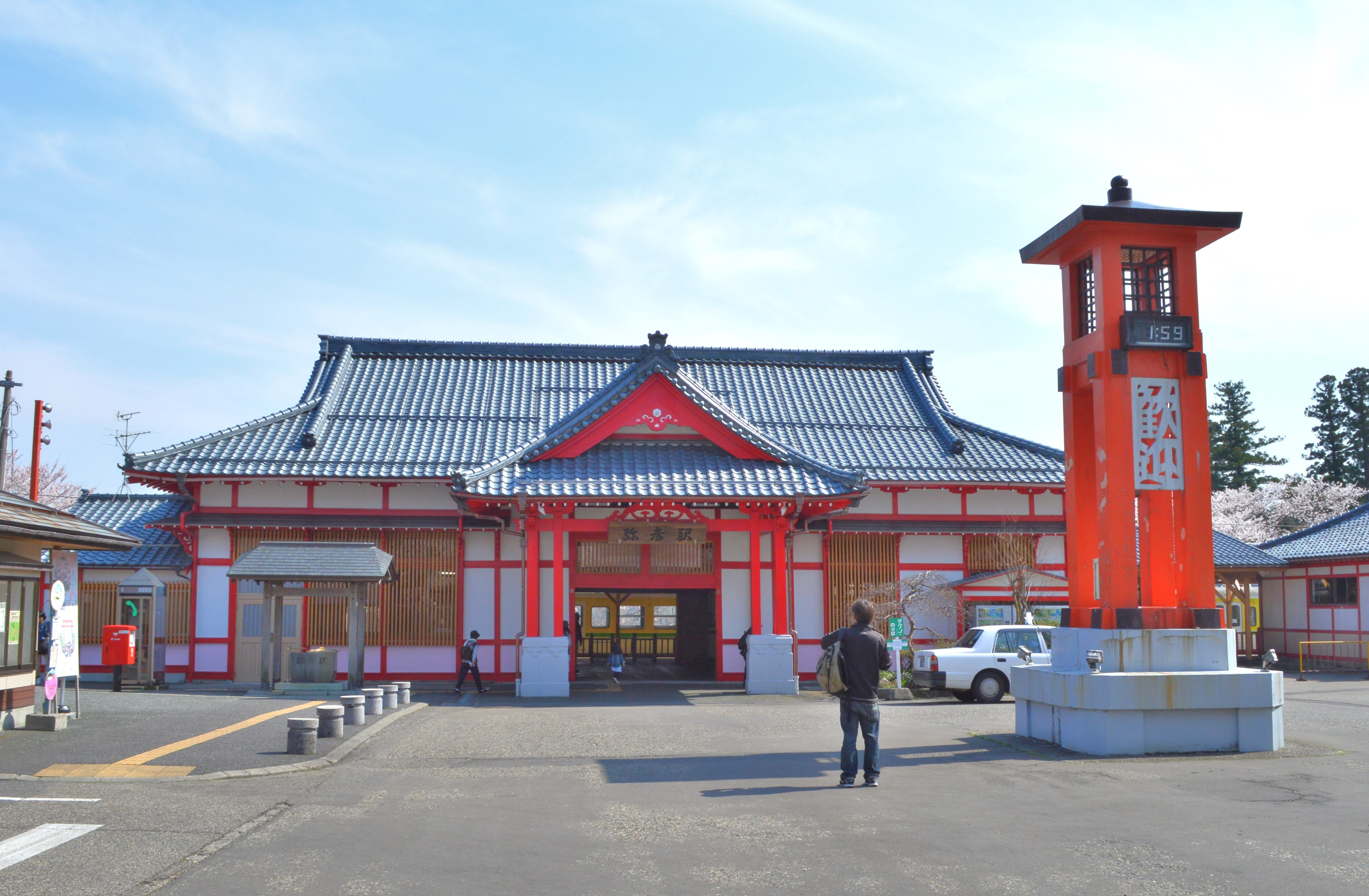
- Yahiko Station in April 2014

General information
- Location: Yahiko, Yahiko-mura, Nishikanbara-gun, Niigata-ken 959-0323; Japan
- Coordinates: 37.6994°N 138.8320°E
- Operator: JR East
- Line: ■ Yahiko Line
- Distance: 17.4 km from Higashi-Sanjō
- Platforms: 1 side platform
- Tracks: 1

Other information
- Status: Staffed (Midori no Madoguchi)
- Website: Official website

History
- Opened: 16 October 1916; 109 years ago

Passengers
- FY2017: 210 daily

Services
Preceding station	JR East	Following station
Terminus	Yahiko Line	Yahagi towards Higashi-Sanjō
Location
- Location within JR Yahiko Line Location within Japan

Yahiko Station (弥彦駅, Yahiko-eki) is a railway station on the Yahiko Line in the village of Yahiko, Niigata, Japan, operated by East Japan Railway Company (JR East).

== Lines ==
Yahiko Station is the terminus of the Yahiko Line, and is 17.4 kilometers from opposing terminus of the line at Higashi-Sanjō Station.

== Station layout ==
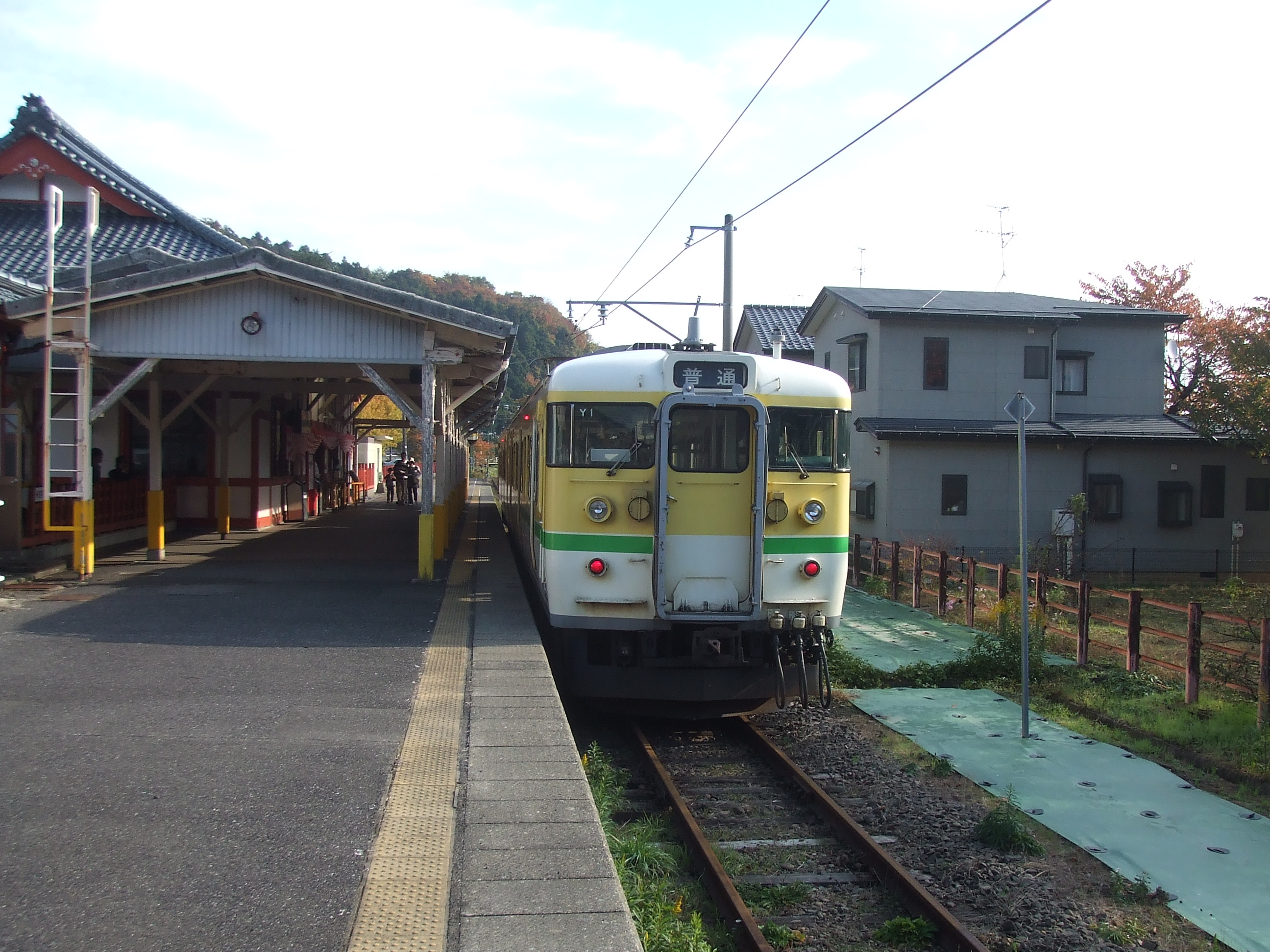
View of the station platform, November 2008

The station has a single ground-level side platform.

The station has a Midori no Madoguchi staffed ticket office. Suica farecards can be used at this station.

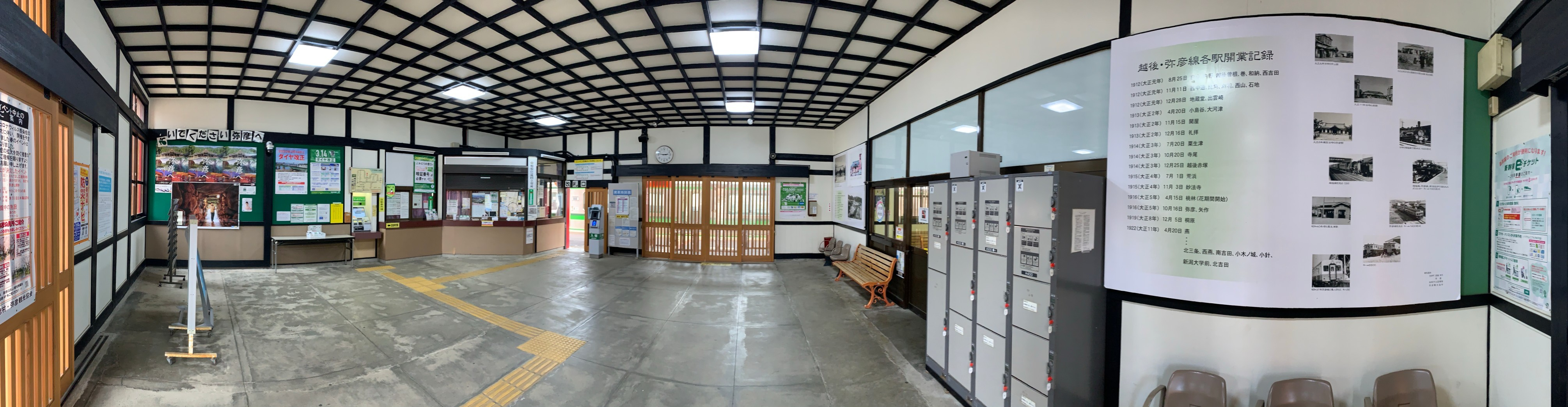
Station interior, April 2020

== History ==
The station opened on 16 October 1916. With the privatization of Japanese National Railways (JNR) on 1 April 1987, the station came under the control of JR East.

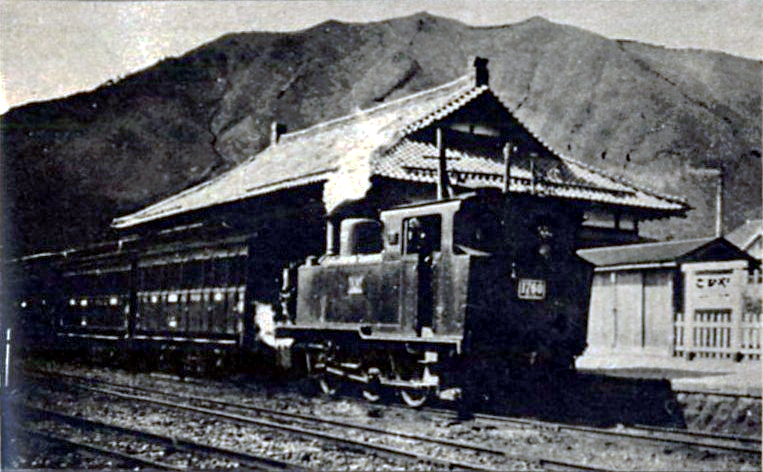
The station in 1929

== Passenger statistics ==
In fiscal 2017, the station was used by an average of 210 passengers daily (boarding passengers only).

== Surrounding area ==
- Yahiko Shrine
- Yahiko Post Office
- Mount Yahiko
- Yahikoyama Ropeway
- Yahiko Velodrome

== See also ==
- List of railway stations in Japan
