= Toyookadaruma Station =

Railway station under construction in Takasaki, Gunma Prefecture, Japan

Toyookadaruma Station 豊岡だるま駅
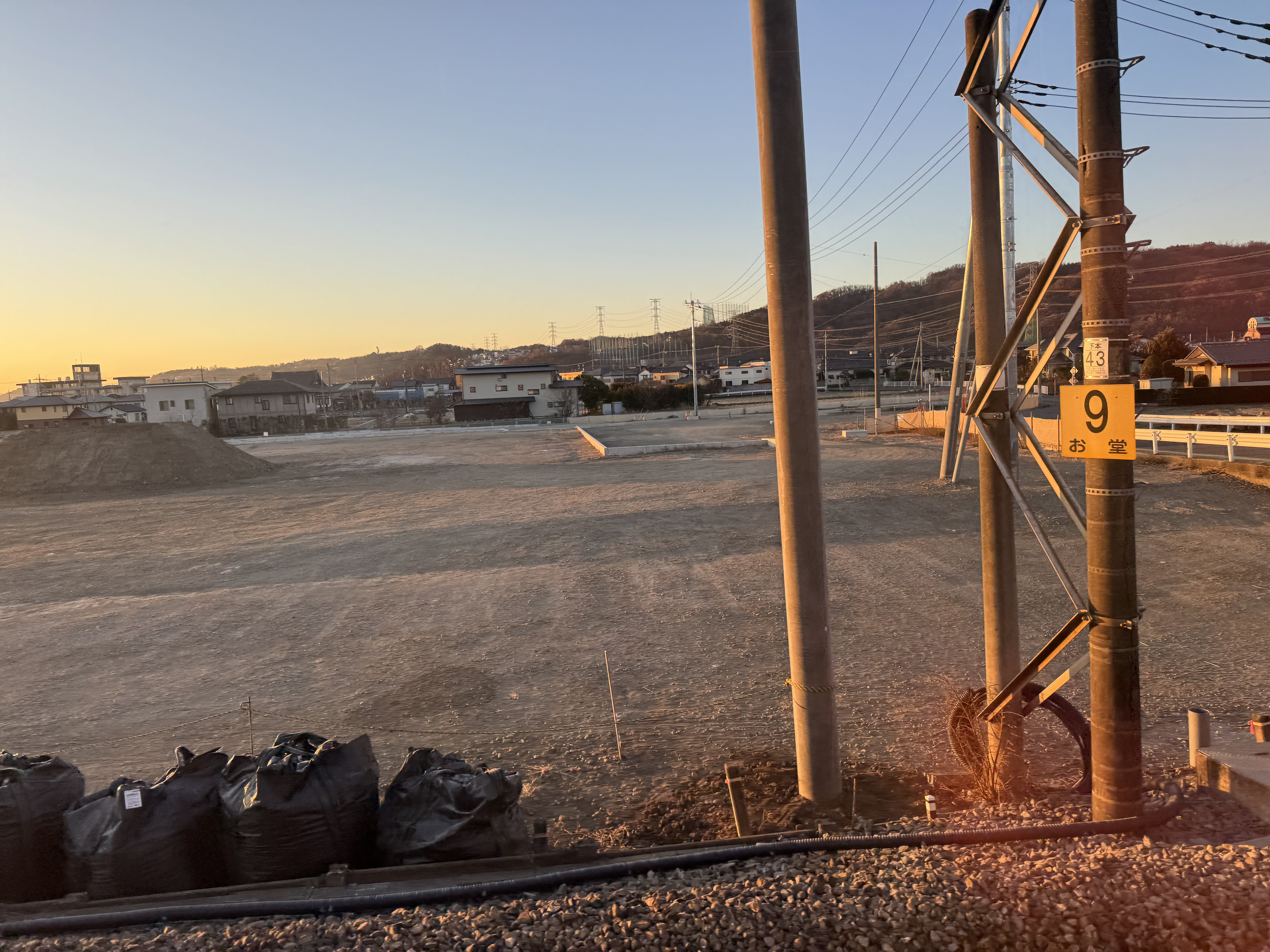
- The site of Toyookadaruma Station in December 2024

General information
- Location: Shimo Toyooka-cho, Takasaki-shi, Gunma-ken; Japan
- Coordinates: 36.337778°N 138.973167°E
- Operator: JR East
- Line: ■ Shin'etsu Main Line
- Platforms: 2 side platforms
- Tracks: 2

Other information
- Status: Under construction

History
- Opening: March 2027 (scheduled)

Services
Preceding station	JR East	Following station
Gumma-Yawata towards Yokokawa	Shin'etsu Main Line Takasaki – Yokokawa	Kita-Takasaki towards Takasaki
Location
- Location within Gunma Prefecture Location within Japan

Toyookadaruma Station (豊岡だるま駅, Toyookadaruma-eki) is a future infill railway station in the city of Takasaki, Gunma, Japan, to be operated by the East Japan Railway Company (JR East). It is projected to be used by an average of around 1,600 passengers daily.

== Line ==
Toyookadaruma Station will be a station on the Shin'etsu Main Line, and located 2.6 kilometres from Kita-Takasaki and 1.4 kilometres from Gumma-Yawata.

== Station layout ==
The station will have two side platforms serving two tracks. The platforms will be 125 metres long and capable of accommodating trains that are up to six cars in length. A station square consisting of a bicycle parking area, a bus stop and parking for approximately 120 cars will be located near the south side of the station. It will be unattended.

== History ==
On 27 March 2023, JR East and Takasaki City signed an agreement to build a new station on the Shin'etsu Line between Kita-Takasaki and Gumma-Yawata.

From June to July 2024, a public survey for naming the station took place. On 13 December of that year, the finalised station name was announced.

On 22 February 2025, a groundbreaking ceremony to commence construction of the station took place in Takasaki City. The total cost of building the station was approximately 3 billion yen.

The station is scheduled to commence operations in March 2027.

== Surrounding area ==
- National Route 18
- National Route 406
- Naka-Toyooka Housing Complex
- Takasaki City University of Economics
