= Hachiman Kannonzuka Kofun =

Kofun period burial mound in Takasaki, Japan

- 八幡観音塚古墳 (Japanese)
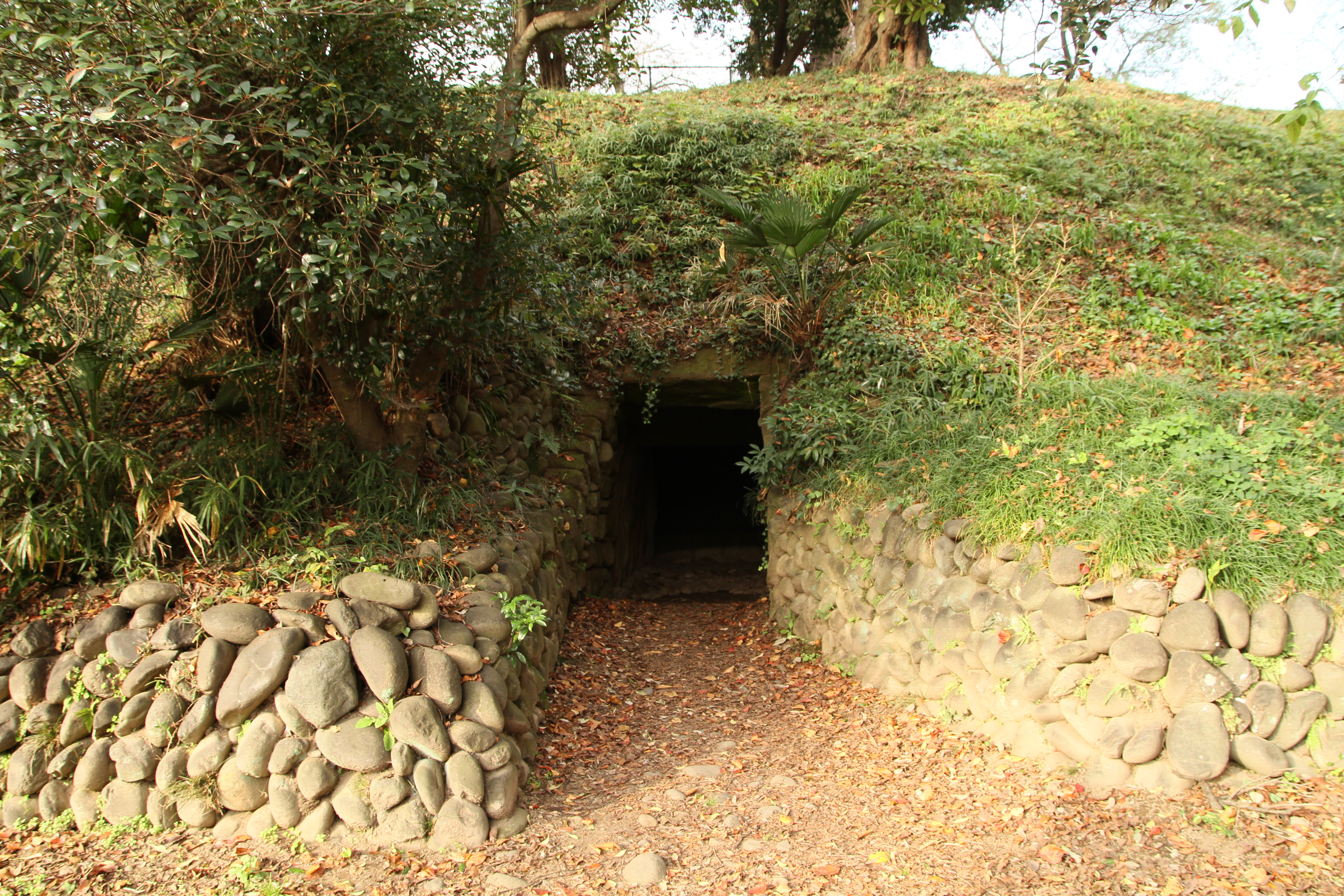
- Hachiman Kannonzuka Kofun

- Hachiman Kannonzuka Kofun Hachiman Kannonzuka Kofun (Japan)
- 36°20′30″N 138°56′27″E
- Type: kofun
- Periods: Kofun period
- Location: Takasaki, Gunma, Japan
- Region: Kantō region

Site notes
- Discovered: 1973
- Public access: Yes (Museum nearby)

Hachiman Kannonzuka Kofun (八幡観音塚古墳) is a Kofun period burial mound located in the Hachiman neighborhood the city of Takasaki, Gunma Prefecture in the northern Kantō region of Japan. The site was designated a National Historic Site of Japan in 1948. The site dates from the late 6th century AD, and many of the grave goods discovered during the archaeological excavation were designated National Important Cultural Properties in 1961

== Overview ==
The Hachiman Kannonzuka Kofun is located on a plateau sandwiched between the Karasugawa River and the Usui River, northwest of the city of Takasaki. It is a zenpō-kōen-fun (前方後円墳), which is shaped like a keyhole, having one square end and one circular end, when viewed from above. Its main dimensions are:

Total length
105 meters
Anterior rectangular portion
105 meters wide x 14 meters high, 4-tier
Posterior circular portion
70 meter diameter x 14 meters high, 3-tiers

The tumulus is built in four tiers in the rectangular portion and three tiers for the circular portion. Unusually, the width of the rectangular portion is larger than the circular portion. The tumulus was at least partially surrounded by a moat. The 15.8 meter long horizontal burial chamber is made from stone megaliths, some measuring 4.5 x 3.4 meters, weighing over 50 tons, orientated to the southwest. The size of the megaliths used to make this chamber is also unusual, and the tomb is comparable to the Ishibutai Kofun in Asuka. The burial chamber was found to be intact when opened in March 1945 by locals who were building a bomb shelter and some 300 artifacts were discovered within. These grave goods included four bronze mirrors, gold, silver and glass jewelry, iron swords, iron spearheads, fragments of armor, horse harnesses, saddles, stirrups and Sue ware, Haji ware, and other containers of earthenware and metal. Two of the bronze mirrors were identical to those found in the Inariyama Kofun in Saitama Prefecture and must have been cast using the same mould. From these artifacts, the tumulus has been dated to the end of the 6th century to the beginning of the 7th century AD, and may have been one of the last of the great keyhole-shaped kofun to have been built in Gunma.

The recovered artifacts were found to be in good preservation, and many are displayed at the nearby Kannonzuka Archaeological Museum (観音塚考古資料館, Kannonzuka kōko shiryōkan). It is about a 30-minute walk from Gumma-Yawata Station on the JR East Shin'etsu Main Line.

== Gallery ==
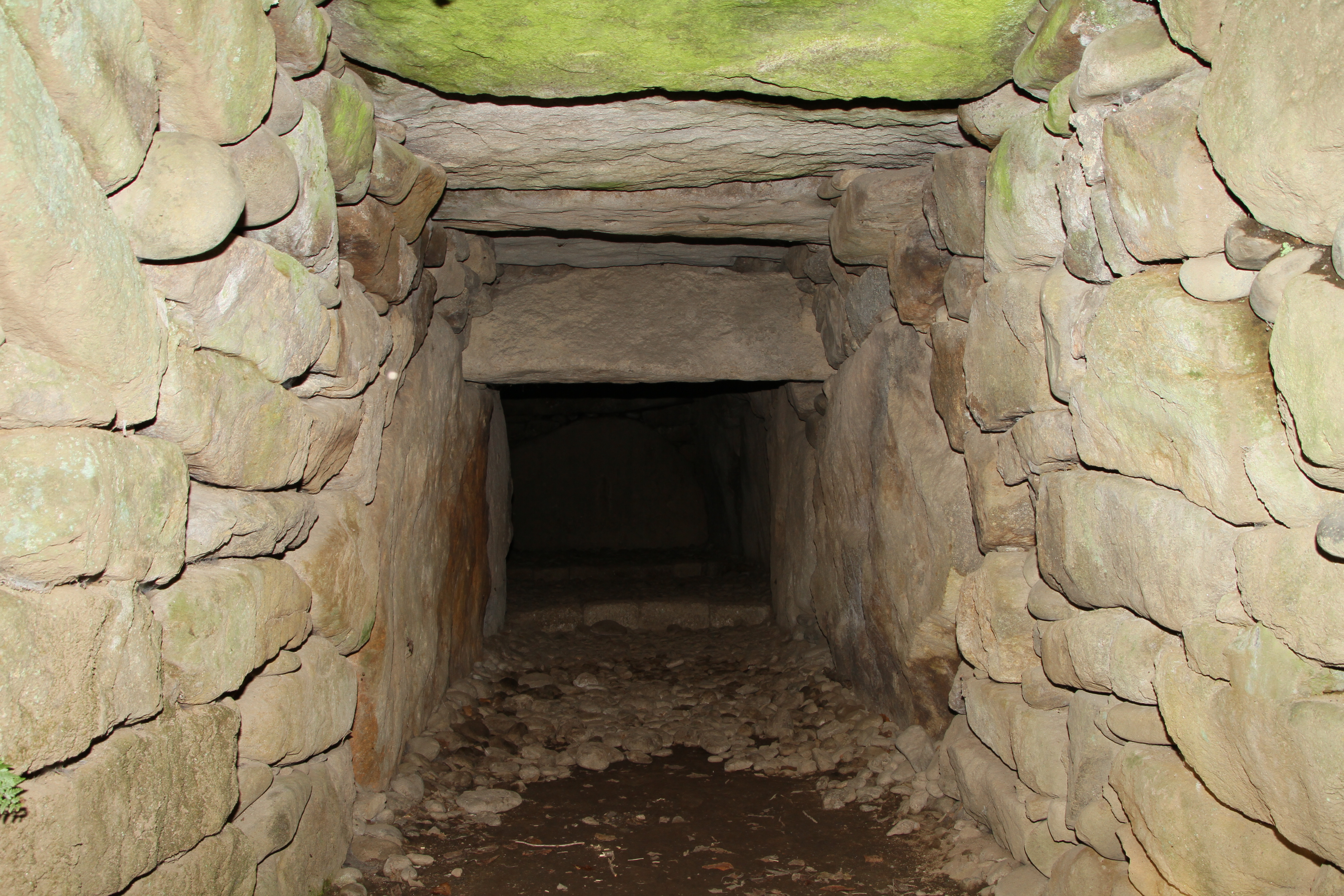
Entry to Burial Chamber

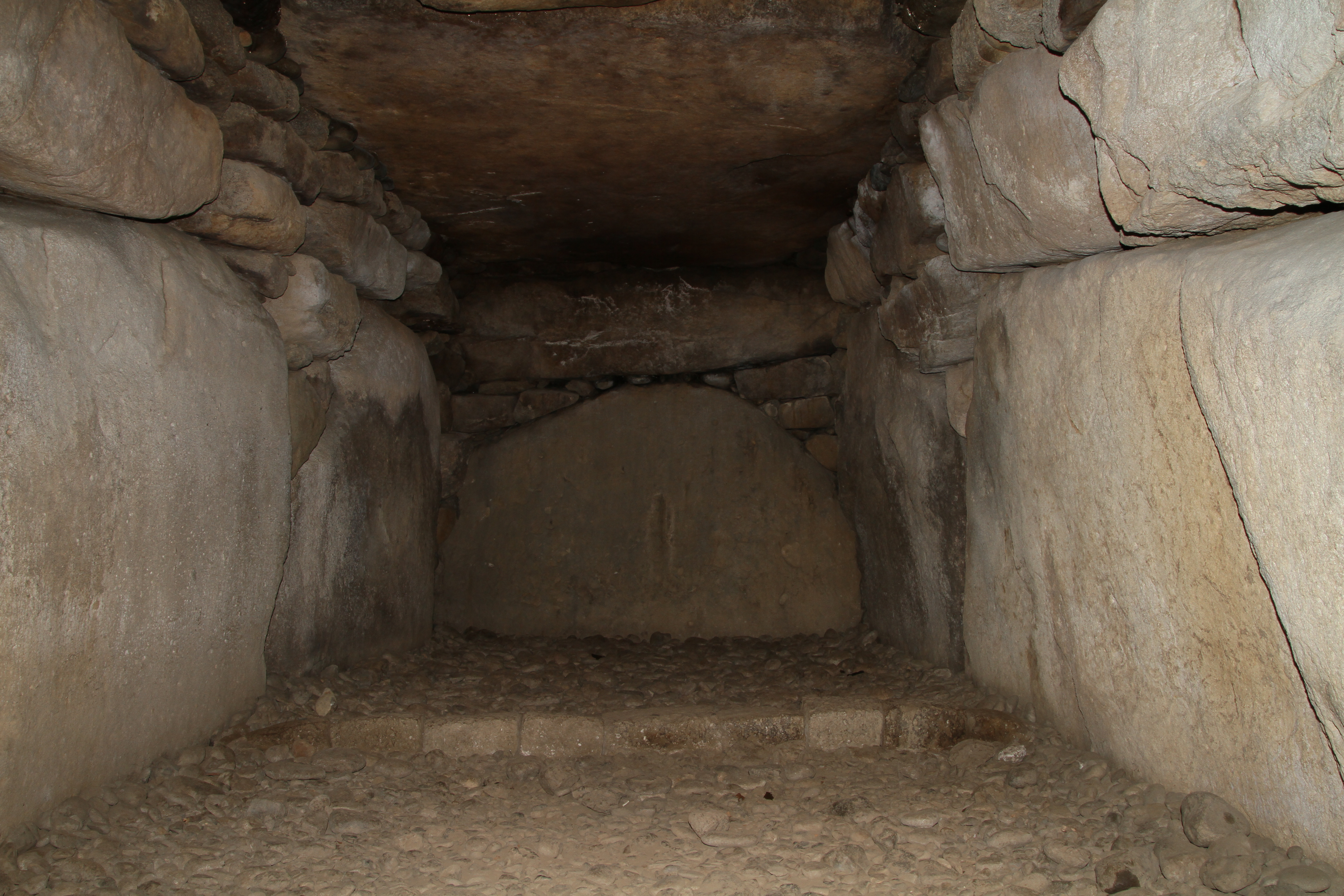
Inside Burial Chamber

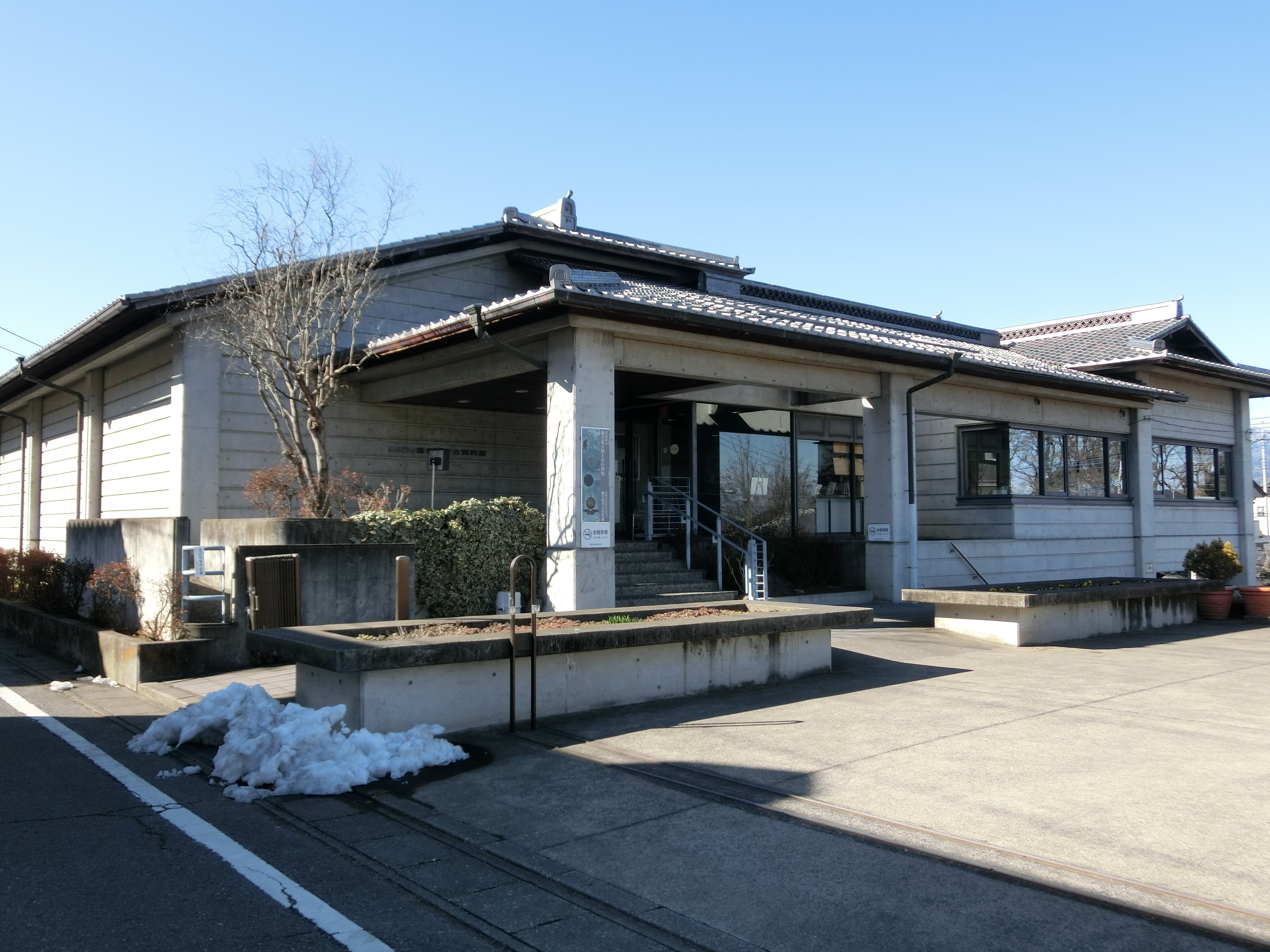
Kannonzuka Museum of Archaeology

== See also ==
- List of Historic Sites of Japan (Gunma)
