= Echigo =

Echigo may refer to:

- Echigo Province, a former province in north-central Japan corresponding today to Niigata Prefecture
- Echigo Mountains, a mountain range in Niigata, Fukushima, and Gunma prefectures
- Echigo Plain, an alluvial plain in Niigata Prefecture
- Echigo Kotsu, a public transportation company in Niigata prefecture
- Echigo Line, a railway line in Niigata Prefecture
- Moonlight Echigo, a seasonal rapid overnight train service in Niigata Prefecture
- 136743 Echigo, an asteroid

== See also ==
- Echigo mole, an endangered species of mole found only on the Echigo plain, Niigata prefecture
- Kazuo Echigo, a Japananese former footballer and coach
- Sérgio Echigo, a Brazilian former footballer and commentator
