= Kuroi Station =

Kuroi Station (黒井駅) is the name of two train stations in Japan:

- Kuroi Station (Hyogo), a railway station in the city of Tanba, Hyōgo Prefecture, Japan, opened 1899
- Kuroi Station (Niigata), a railway station in Jōetsu, Niigata Prefecture, Japan, opened 1902 as a freight station; passenger service began 1906
