= Minami-Nagaoka Freight Terminal =

Freight terminal in Nagaoka, Niigata Prefecture, Japan

Coordinates: 37°25′55″N 138°50′51″E

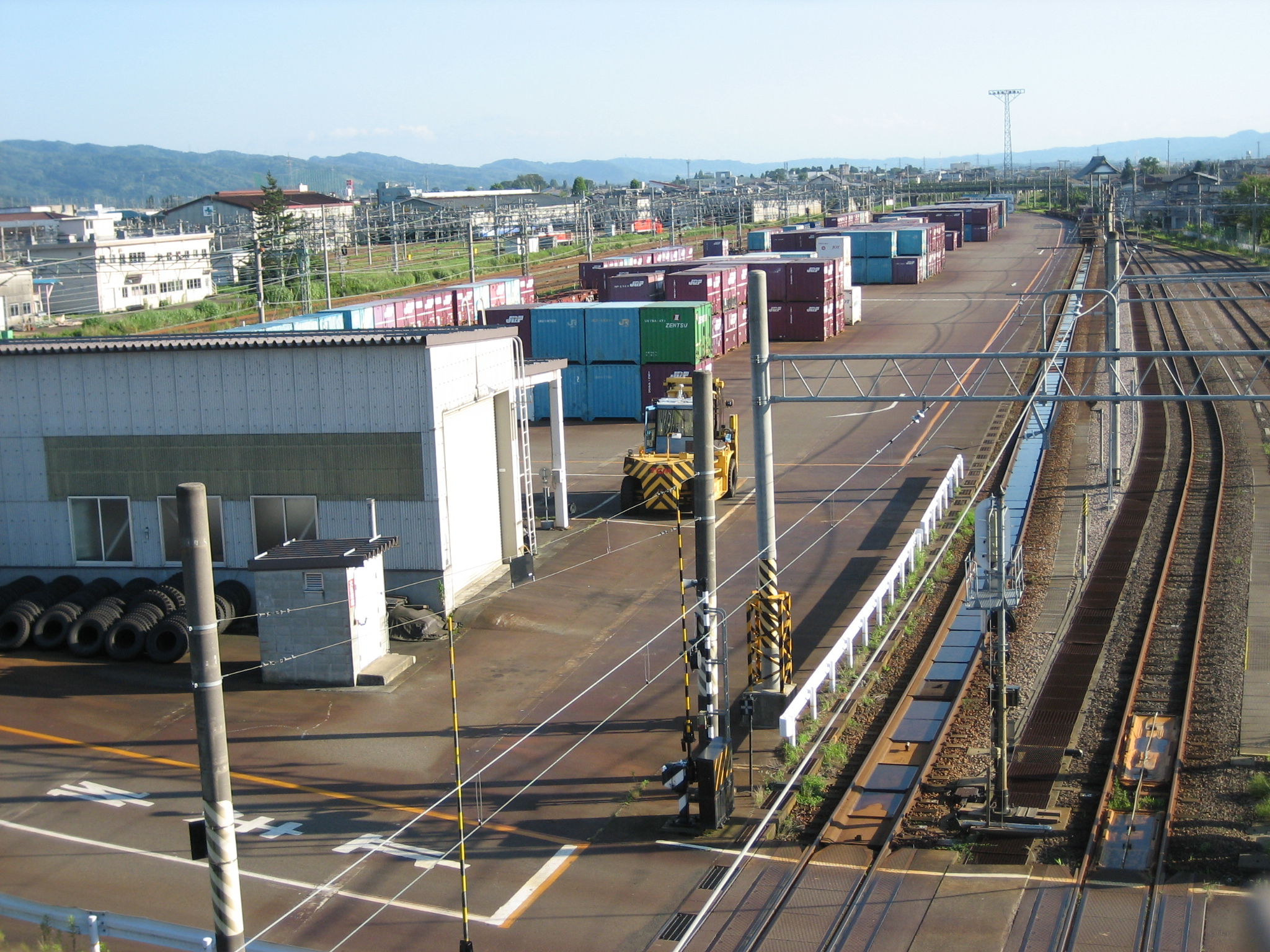
Overview of Minami-Nagaoka Freight Terminal, July 2007

Minami-Nagaoka Freight Terminal (南長岡駅, Minami-Nagaoka-eki) is a freight terminal in Nagaoka, Niigata Prefecture, Japan, operated by Japan Freight Railway Company (JR Freight). It was opened on January 10, 1966.

== Lines ==
The freight terminal is located on the Jōetsu Line and Shin'etsu Main Line.
