= Annaka Station =

Railway station in Annaka, Gunma Prefecture, Japan

Annaka Station 安中駅
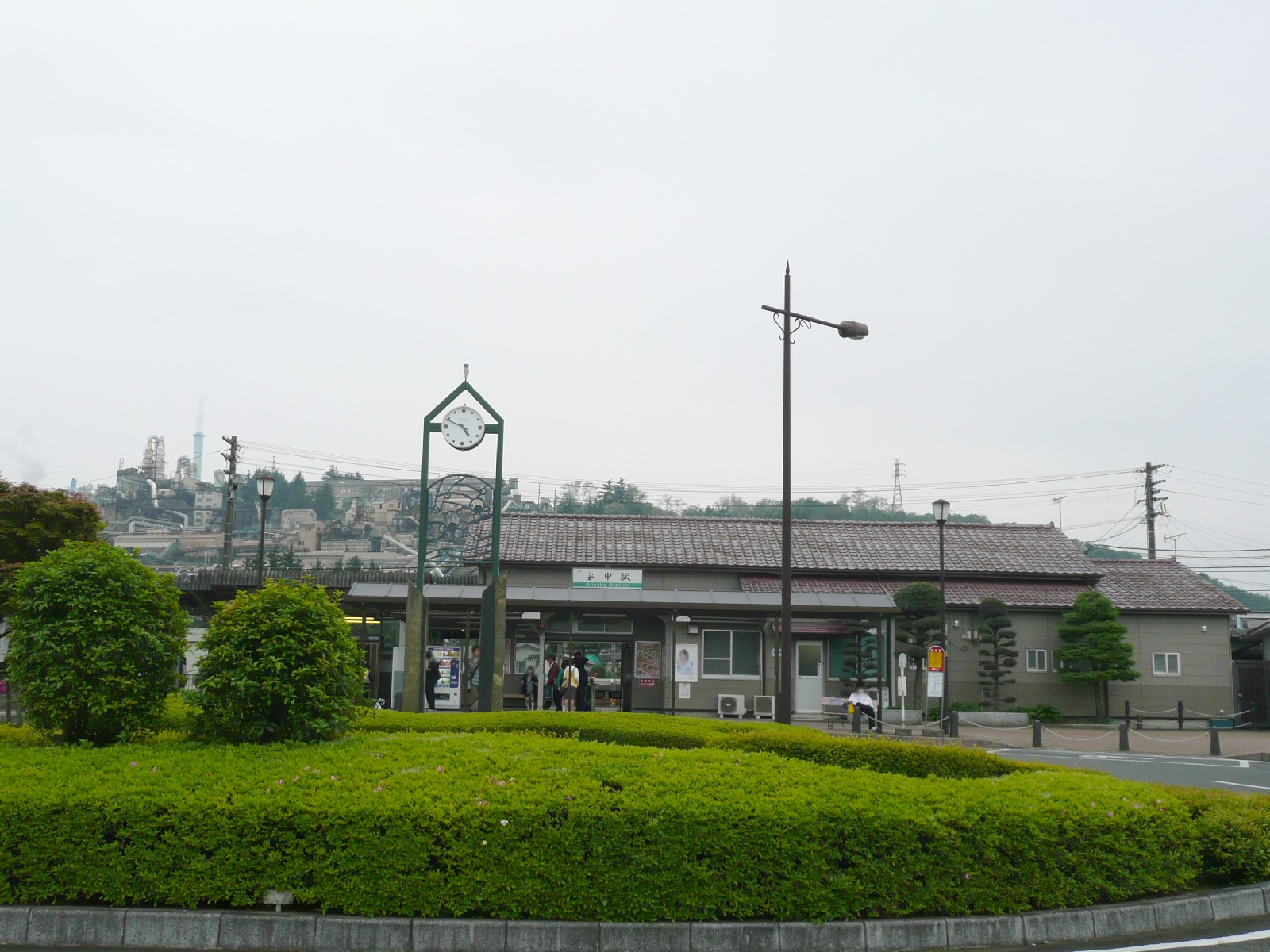
- Annaka Station in May 2009

General information
- Location: 950 Nakajuku, Annaka-shi, Gunma-ken 379-0115; Japan
- Coordinates: 36.3318°N 138.9144°E
- Operator: JR East
- Line: ■ Shin'etsu Line
- Distance: 10.6 km from Takasaki
- Platforms: 2 side platforms
- Tracks: 3

Other information
- Status: Staffed
- Website: Official website

History
- Opened: 15 October 1885

Passengers
- FY2019: 1821

Services
| Preceding station | JR East | Following station |
|---|---|---|
| Isobe towards Yokokawa | Shin'etsu Main Line Takasaki – Yokokawa | Gumma-Yawata towards Takasaki |
Location
- Location within Gunma Prefecture Location within Japan

Annaka Station (安中駅, Annaka-eki) is a railway station in the city of Annaka, Gunma, Japan, operated by the East Japan Railway Company (JR East).

== Lines ==
Annaka Station is a station on the Shin'etsu Main Line, and is located 10.6 km from the starting point of the line at Takasaki.

== Station layout ==
The station has two opposed side platforms connected to the station building by a footbridge. The station is attended.

=== Platforms ===
| 1 | ■ Shin'etsu Main Line | for Takasaki |
| 2 | ■ Shin'etsu Main Line | for Yokokawa |

== History ==
Annaka Station opened on 15 October 1885. With the privatization of the Japanese National Railways (JNR) on 1 April 1987, the station came under the control of JR East.

== Passenger statistics ==
In fiscal 2019, the station was used by an average of 1821 passengers daily (boarding passengers only).

== Surrounding area ==
- National Route 18
- Annaka City Hall
- Annaka Post Office
- Toho Zinc Plant

== See also ==
- List of railway stations in Japan
