= Gunma University =

National university in Japan

- 群馬大学
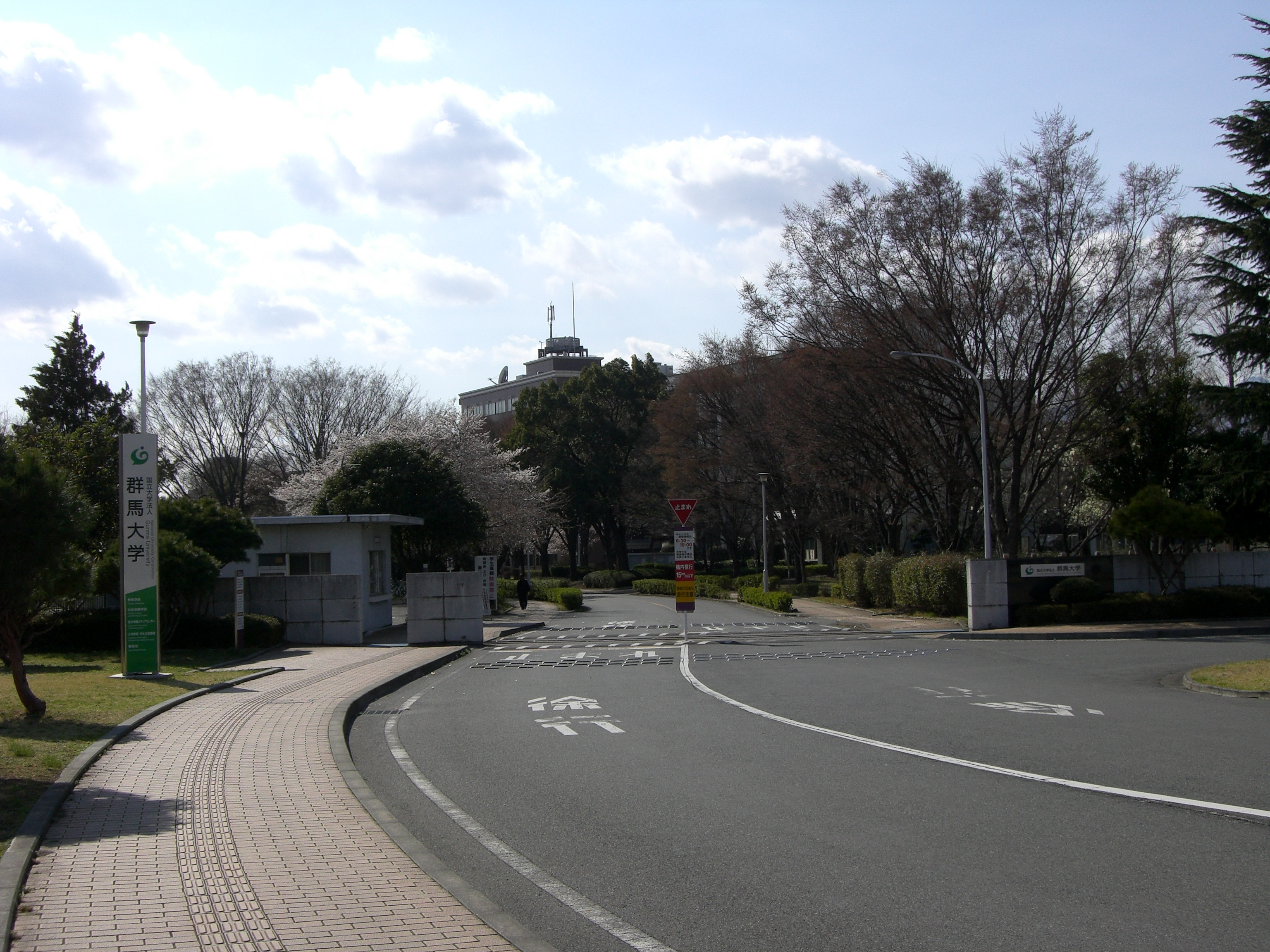
- Type: National
- Established: 1949
- President: Mamoru Suzuki
- Students: 6,486
- Undergraduates: 5,133
- Postgraduates: 1,342
- Other students: 11
- Location: Maebashi, Gunma, Japan; 36°25′49″N 139°02′42″E
- Campus: Urban
- Website: www.gunma-u.ac.jp

- Japan Gunma Prefecture

Gunma University (群馬大学, Gunma daigaku), abbreviated to Gundai (群大), is a national university in Japan. The main campus is located in Aramaki-machi, Maebashi City, Gunma Prefecture.

== History ==
Gunma University was established in 1949 by integrating the national colleges in Gunma Prefecture: Maebashi College of Medical Science (前橋医科大学, Maebashi ika daigaku), Kiryu Technical College (桐生工業専門学校, Kiryū kōgyō semmon gakkō), Gunma Normal School (群馬師範学校, Gunma shihan gakkō) and Gunma Youth Normal School (群馬青年師範学校, Gunma seinen shihan gakkō).

Below are the histories of the predecessors of Gunma University (GU):

=== Maebashi College of Medical Science ===
Maebashi College of Medical Science was founded in 1943 as Maebashi Medical College (前橋医学専門学校), a men's college (age 17-21 or above), to meet the growing need of doctors during World War II. In 1948, the college was reorganized into Maebashi College of Medical Science, a four-year college (age 19-23 or above). In 1949 the college was merged into Gunma University to constitute the Faculty of Medicine. The campus was located in Showa-machi, Maebashi (GU Showa Campus today).

=== Kiryu Technical College ===
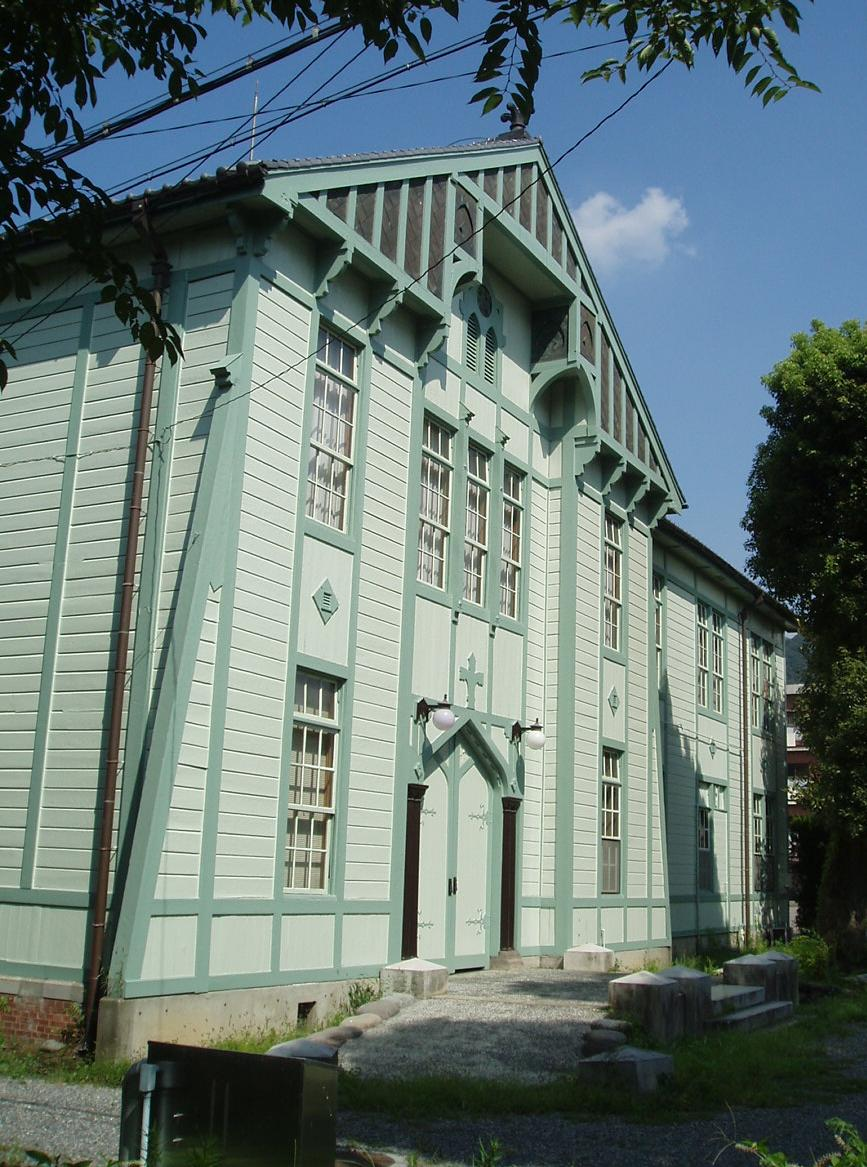
Alumni Memorial Hall in Kiryu Campus (built in 1915)

Kiryu Technical College was founded in 1915 as Kiryu Higher Dyeing and Weaving Vocational School (桐生高等染織学校, Kiryū kōtō senshoku gakkō), a men's college (age 17-20 or above). The college was located in the town of Kiryu, whose main industry was textile manufacturing. In 1920 the college was renamed Kiryu Technical College (桐生高等工業学校, Kiryū kōtō kōgyō gakkō) with the Department of Applied Chemistry added. Departments of mechanics and electronics were also later added. In 1944 the college was renamed, in Japanese, Kiryū kōgyō semmon gakkō (桐生工業専門学校).

In 1949 the college was merged into Gunma University to constitute the Faculty of Engineering. The campus was located in Tenjin-cho, Kiryu (GU Kiryu Campus today). The former main building of the college is partly preserved as the Alumni Memorial Hall (removed to the present position in 1972 to allow construction of a new building with RC).

=== Gunma Normal School ===
Gunma Normal School was founded in February 1873 as the Training Center For Elementary School Teachers by Gunma Prefecture government. The center was located in Maebashi. In June 1873 Gunma Prefecture was merged with a part of present-day Saitama Prefecture to constitute Kumagaya Prefecture. The training center was renamed Chohatsu School (暢発学校) and removed to Honjo, and then to Kumagaya. In September 1876 the school was removed to Takasaki and renamed Normal School of Gunma Prefecture (群馬県師範学校), for the present-day Gunma Prefecture was established in August 1876. In October 1876 the school was removed again to Maebashi, from then on Maebashi was home to the school.

The normal school underwent several removals and renamings. In 1901 Gunma Girls' Normal School was established, and the Normal School of Gunma Prefecture became a boys' school. In 1943 the two prefectural normal schools (boys' and girls') were merged into Gunma Normal School, a national college: the men's department was located in Hiyoshi-cho, Maebashi and the women's department was in Wakamiya-cho, Maebashi. In 1949 the normal school was merged into Gunma University to constitute the Faculty of Liberal Arts (renamed Faculty of Education in 1966).

The Faculty of Education was removed to newborn Aramaki Campus in 1970, and former Hiyoshi Campus was abolished; former Wakamiya Campus is used by the GU-attached Elementary School and the School for Children with Special Needs.

=== Gunma Youth Normal School ===
Gunma Youth Normal School was founded in 1918 as Agricultural Training School (one-year school), which was attached to the Normal School of Gunma Prefecture. The purpose of the school was to nurture agricultural teachers. The school was later renamed Gunma Prefectural Training Center for Teachers of Adolescent Youth (a two-year school) in 1935. The purpose of the center was to nurture the teachers of youth schools (青年学校, seinen gakkō), which were the institutions to train working youths. In 1944 the Training Center was reorganized into Gunma Youth Normal School, a national college. The school was removed to Takasaki to have an independent campus. Finally in 1947 the school got its campus in the former site of the Army. In 1949 the normal school was merged into Gunma University to constitute the Faculty of Liberal Arts (renamed Faculty of Education in 1966). In 1951 Takasaki Campus was abolished (see Takasaki City University of Economics).

== Faculties ==
- Cooperative Faculty of Education (in Aramaki Campus)
- Faculty of Social and Information Studies (in Aramaki Campus)
- Faculty of Informatics (in Aramaki Campus)
- Faculty of Medicine, School of Medicine, School of Health Sciences (in Showa Campus)
- School of Science and Technology (in Kiryu Campus)

== Graduate Schools ==
- Graduate School of Education (Master's courses only)
- Graduate School of Social and Information Studies (Master's courses only)
- Graduate School of Medicine (Master's/Doctoral)
- Graduate School of Health Sciences (Master's/Doctoral)
- Graduate School of Science and Technology (Master's/Doctoral)

== Institutes ==
- Library and Information Technology Center
- University Hospital (in Showa Campus)
- Institute for Molecular and Cellular Regulation (in Showa Campus)
  - Biosignal Genome Resource Center
- Joint Facilities for Research and Education
  - Heavy Ion Medical Center (in Showa Campus)
  - Advanced Technology Research Center (in Kiryu Campus)
  - Innovative Center for Cooperative Research (in Kiryu Campus)
  - Center for Material Research by Instrumental Analysis (in Kiryu Campus)

== Sister universities ==
- Taiwan
  - National Formosa University
