= Kita-Takasaki Station =

Railway station in Takasaki, Gunma Prefecture, Japan

Kita-Takasaki Station 北高崎駅
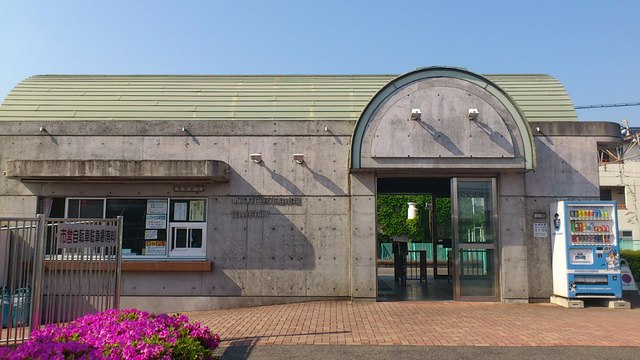
- Kita-Takasaki Station in May 2012

General information
- Location: Ōhashimachi, Takasaki-shi, Gunma-ken 370–0069; Japan
- Coordinates: 36.3385°N 139.0009°E
- Operator: JR East
- Line: ■ Shin'etsu Line
- Distance: 2.4 km from Takasaki
- Platforms: 2 side platforms

Other information
- Status: Staffed
- Website: Official website

History
- Opened: 15 October 1885
- Former names: Iizuka (until 1919)

Passengers
- FY2019: 1631

Services
| Preceding station | JR East | Following station |
|---|---|---|
| Gumma-Yawata towards Yokokawa | Shin'etsu Main Line Takasaki – Yokokawa | Takasaki Terminus |
Location
- Location within Gunma Prefecture Location within Japan

Kita-Takasaki Station (北高崎駅, Kita-Takasaki-eki) is a passenger railway station in the city of Takasaki, Gunma, Japan, operated by the East Japan Railway Company (JR East).

== Lines ==
Kita-Takasaki Station is a station on the Shinetsu Main Line, and is located 2.4 km from the starting point of the line at Takasaki.

== Station layout ==
The station consists of two opposed side platforms connected to the station building by a footbridge. The station is attended.

=== Platforms ===
| 1 | ■ Shinetsu Main Line | for Yokokawa |
| 2 | ■ Shinetsu Main Line | for Takasaki |

== History ==
The station opened on 15 October 1885 as Iizuka Station (飯塚駅, Iizuka-eki). It was renamed Kita-Takasaki Station on 1 August 1919. With the privatization of the Japanese National Railways (JNR) on 1 April 1987, the station came under the control of JR East. A new station building was completed in March 2001.

== Passenger statistics ==
In fiscal 2019, the station was used by an average of 1197 passengers daily (boarding passengers only).

== Surrounding area ==
- Takasaki City University of Economics
- Niijima Gakuen Junior College

== See also ==
- List of railway stations in Japan
