= Koshino Shu*Kura =

Sightseeing train in Niigata Prefecture, Japan

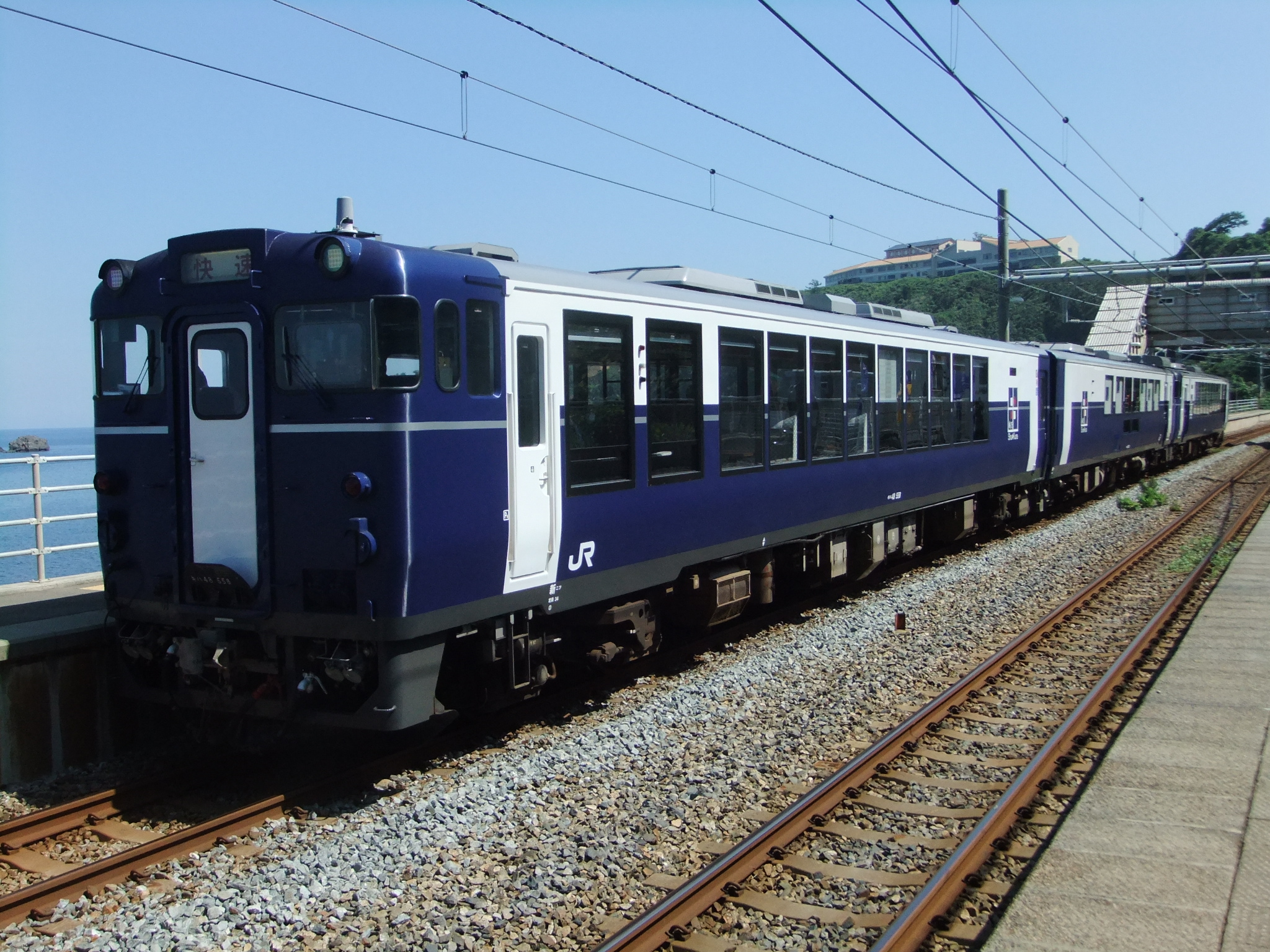
- Koshino Shu*Kura at Ōmigawa Station

Overview
- Service type: Rapid
- Status: Operational
- Locale: Japan
- First service: May 2014
- Current operators: JR East, Echigo TOKImeki Railway

Route
- Termini: Jōetsumyōkō; Tōkamachi
- Lines used: Shinetsu Main Line, Iiyama Line

On-board services
- Class: Standard only

Technical
- Rolling stock: KiHa 40, 48 DMUs
- Track gauge: 1,067 mm (3 ft 6 in)

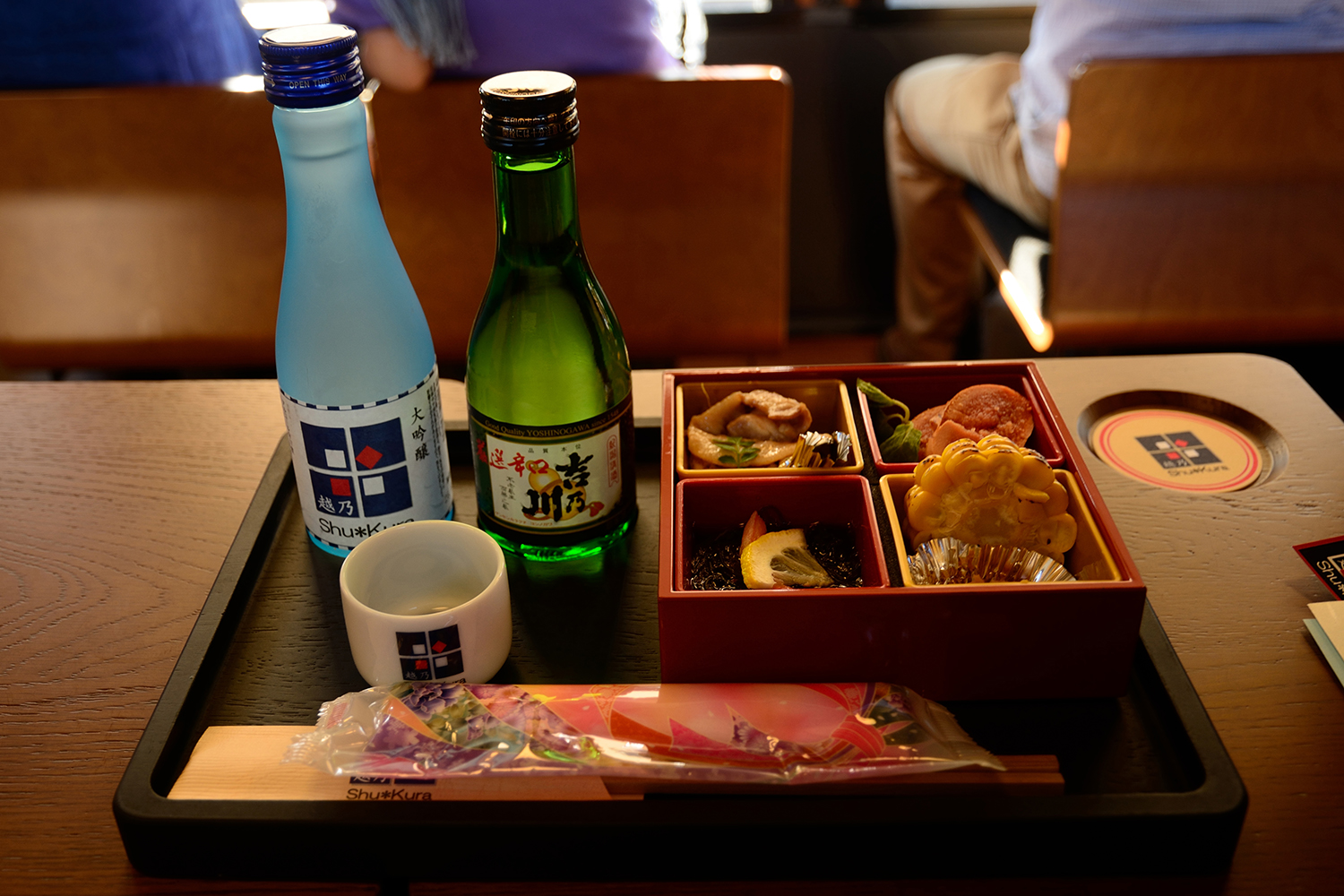
Sake and snacks

The Koshino Shu*Kura (越乃Shu*Kura) is a limited-stop "Rapid" service operated by the East Japan Railway Company (JR East) as a sightseeing train in Niigata Prefecture, Japan since May 2014.

== Operations ==
The train service usually operates between Jōetsumyōkō and Tōkamachi via the Shinetsu Main Line and Iiyama Line.

== Rolling stock ==
Services are operated by a three-car diesel multiple unit set based at Niitsu Depot, converted from former KiHa 40, 48 DMU cars.

== See also ==
- Joyful Train
