= Shin'etsu Main Line =

Lines operated by the East Japan Railway Company (JR East) in Japan

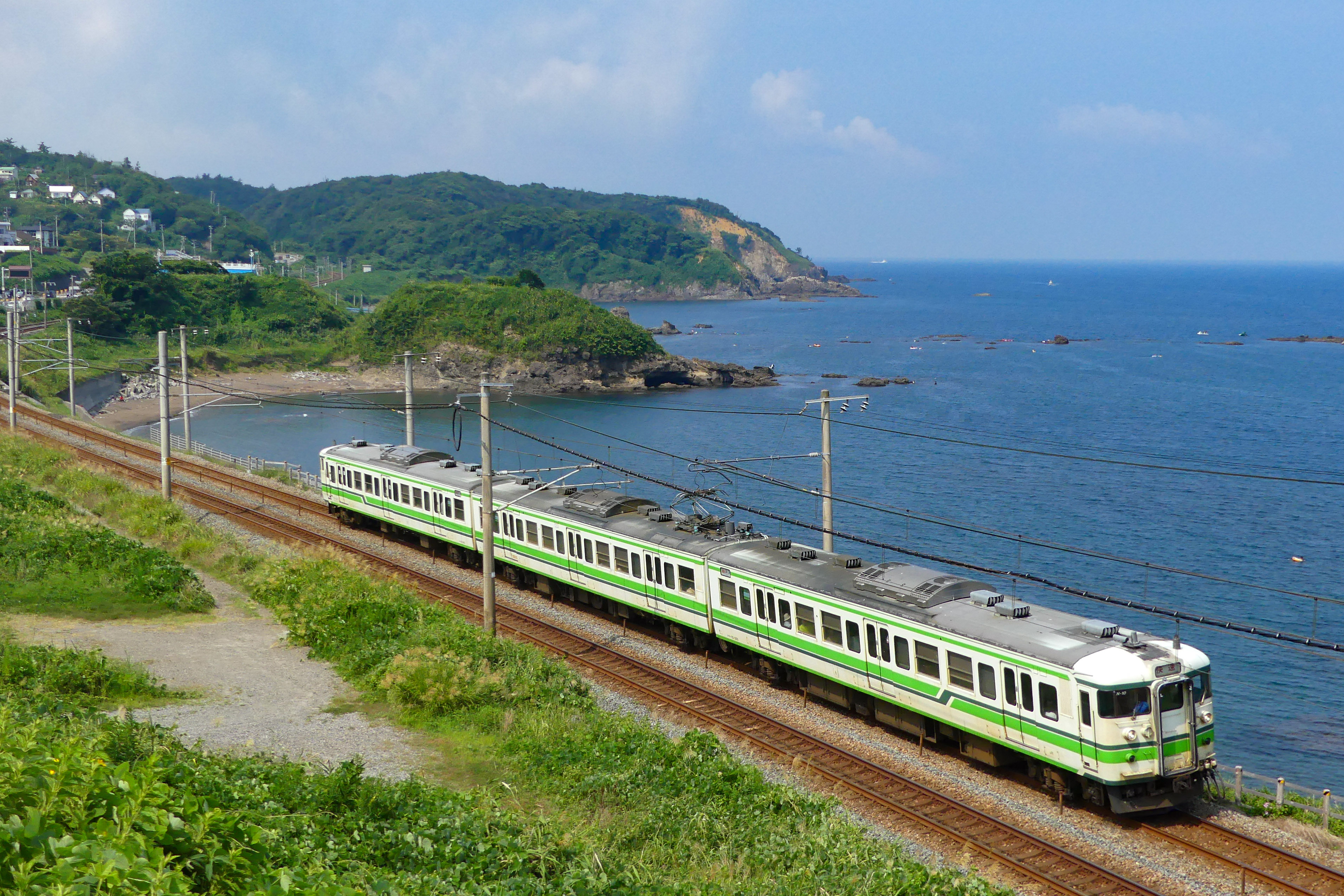
- A 115 series train (Ōmigawa–Kujiranami)

Overview
- Native name: 信越本線
- Status: Operational
- Locale: Gunma, Nagano, and Niigata prefectures

Service
- Operator: East Japan Railway Company (JR East)

History
- Opened: Stages between 1885 (141 years ago) and 1904 (122 years ago)
- Closed: Yokokawa–Karuizawa: 1 October 1997; Karuizawa–Shinonoi: 1 October 1997 (→Shinano Railway Line); Nagano–Naoetsu: 14 March 2015 (→ Kita-Shinano Line, ETR Myōkō Haneuma Line)

Technical
- Line length: 175.3 km (108.9 mi)
- Track gauge: 1,067 mm (3 ft 6 in)
- Electrification: 1,500 V DC overhead catenary
Route map
Map legend
Red: Shin-etsu Main Line
Blue: Shinano Railway Line, Kita-Shinano Line and Myōkō Haneuma Line

The Shinetsu Main Line (Japanese: 信越本線, Hepburn: Shin'etsu-honsen) is a railway line, consisting of three geographically separated sections, operated by the East Japan Railway Company (JR East) in Japan. It was originally one continuous line connecting Takasaki and Niigata via Nagano. Since the opening and later extension of the Hokuriku Shinkansen, sections running in parallel have either been discontinued or transferred to third-sector railway companies.

The name of the line refers to the old names for Nagano and Niigata prefectures, Shinano (Japanese: 信濃), and Echigo (Japanese: 越後).

The discontinued section through the Usui Pass was famous for its steep 66.7‰ (6.67%) gradient.

== Sections ==
From 14 March 2015, the line consists of the following three sections.

- ■ Takasaki – Yokokawa (29.7 km): in Gunma Prefecture
- ■ Shinonoi – Nagano (9.3 km): in Nagano Prefecture
- ■ Naoetsu – Niigata (136.3 km): in Niigata Prefecture

There are three small freight branches; from Echigo-Ishiyama Station to Niigata Freight Terminal, from Kami-Nuttari Junction to Nuttari Station (discontinued on 25 March 2010), and from Kami-Nuttari Junction to Higashi-Niigata-kō Station.

== Services ==
=== Takasaki–Yokokawa ===
- Local: 1 or 2 trains per hour
- Excursion train: SL Gunma Yokokawa and SL YOGISHA Yokokawa (SL Gunma Yokokawa and SL YOGISHA Yokokawa)

=== Shinonoi–Nagano ===
All trains run through on the Shinonoi Line or the Shinano Railway Line.

=== Naoetsu–Niigata ===
Stations of Shin'etsu Main Line between Naoetsu and Niigata

Limited express, Rapid

As of 3 May 2023, the following services are operated.

Name	Route	Service frequency (daily)
Limited Express Shirayuki	(Jōetsumyōkō/Arai)–Naoetsu–Niigata	4 round trips
Rapid	Naoetsu–Niigata	1 round trip
Rapid	Naoetsu–Nagaoka	3 trips to Nagaoka; 2 trips to Naoetsu
Rapid	Nagaoka–Niigata	1 round trip

Local
Naoetsu–Nagaoka: every 60–120 minutes
Nagaoka–Niitsu: every 60 minutes (every 20 minutes during peaks)
Niitsu–Niigata: every 20 minutes (every 5–10 minutes during peaks)

Excursion train (Joyful Train)
Koshino Shu*Kura

== Stations ==
=== Takasaki–Yokokawa ===
All stations are in Gunma Prefecture.

Station	Japanese	Distance (km)	SL/GV	Connections	Location
Takasaki	高崎	0.0	●	Joetsu Shinkansen; Hokuriku Shinkansen; ■ Takasaki Line; ■ Hachikō Line; ■ Jōetsu Line; ■ Agatsuma Line (Note: Although the official terminus of the Ryōmō Line is at Shin-Maebashi and that of the Agatsuma Line is at Shibukawa, trains on both lines run through to Takasaki.); ■ Ryōmō Line; ■ Joshin Dentetsu Joshin Line	Takasaki
Kita-Takasaki	北高崎	2.4	｜		Takasaki
Toyookadaruma	豊岡だるま	–	｜	scheduled to open in 2026	Takasaki
Gumma-Yawata	群馬八幡	6.4	｜		Takasaki
Annaka	安中	10.6	●		Annaka
Isobe	磯部	17.6	●		Annaka
Matsuida	松井田	22.7	｜		Annaka
Nishi-Matsuida	西松井田	23.9	｜		Annaka
Yokokawa	横川	29.7	●	JR Bus Kanto Usui Line	Annaka

=== Yokokawa–Shinonoi ===
The section between Yokokawa and Karuizawa was closed and the section between Karuizawa and Shinonoi was transferred to the ownership of the third-sector railway operator Shinano Railway from 1 October 1997 with the opening of the Hokuriku Shinkansen (Nagano Shinkansen) between Takasaki and Nagano.

=== Shinonoi–Nagano ===
All stations are in Nagano, Nagano Prefecture.

No.	Station	Japanese	Distance (km)	Connections
SE09	Shinonoi	篠ノ井	0.0	Shinonoi Line (through service); Shinano Railway Line
SE10	Imai	今井	2.1	
SE11	Kawanakajima	川中島	4.3	
SE12	Amori	安茂里	6.4	
SE13	Nagano	長野	9.3	Hokuriku Shinkansen; Shinano Railway Kita-Shinano Line; ■ Iiyama Line (Note: Although the official terminus of the Iiyama Line is at Toyono, trains on the line run through to Nagano.); Nagano Electric Railway

=== Nagano–Naoetsu ===
The section between Nagano and Naoetsu was transferred to the ownership of the third-sector railway operators Shinano Railway and Echigo Tokimeki Railway from 14 March 2015 with the opening of the Hokuriku Shinkansen extension north of Nagano.

=== Naoetsu–Niigata ===
All stations are in Niigata Prefecture.

A: Limited Express Shirayuki
B: Rapid Ohayo-Shinetsu
C: Rapid Rakuraku-Train-Shinetsu
D: Rapid
Trains stop at stations marked "O", skip at stations marked "|".

Station	Japanese	Distance (km)	A	B	C	D	Connections	Location
Naoetsu	直江津	84.3	O	O	O	O	ETR Myōkō Haneuma Line; ETR Nihonkai Hisui Line; ■ Hokuhoku Line	Jōetsu
Kuroi	黒井	87.0	|	|	|	|	■ Hokuhoku Line	Jōetsu
Saigata	犀潟	91.4	|	|	|	O	■ Hokuhoku Line	Jōetsu
Dosokohama	土底浜	93.7	|	|	|	|		Jōetsu
Katamachi	潟町	95.5	|	|	|	|		Jōetsu
Jōgehama	上下浜	98.3	|	|	|	|		Jōetsu
Kakizaki	柿崎	101.9	O	O	O	O		Jōetsu
Yoneyama	米山	107.8	|	|	|	|		Kashiwazaki
Kasashima	笠島	111.7	|	|	|	|		Kashiwazaki
Ōmigawa	青海川	113.9	|	|	|	|		Kashiwazaki
Kujiranami	鯨波	116.9	|	|	|	|		Kashiwazaki
Kashiwazaki	柏崎	120.6	O	O	O	O	■ Echigo Line	Kashiwazaki
Ibarame	茨目	123.6	|	|	|	|		Kashiwazaki
Yasuda	安田	126.5	|	|	|	|		Kashiwazaki
Kitajō	北条	129.1	|	|	|	|		Kashiwazaki
Echigo-Hirota	越後広田	132.4	|	|	|	|		Kashiwazaki
Nagatori	長鳥	135.1	|	|	|	|		Kashiwazaki
Tsukayama	塚山	140.1	|	|	|	|		Nagaoka
Echigo-Iwatsuka	越後岩塚	144.8	|	|	|	|		Nagaoka
Raikōji	来迎寺	147.6	|	O	O	O		Nagaoka
Maekawa	前川	151.7	|	|	|	|		Nagaoka
Miyauchi	宮内	154.3	|	O	O	O	■ Jōetsu Line	Nagaoka
Minami-Nagaoka; Freight Terminal	南長岡	(155.7)						Nagaoka
Nagaoka	長岡	157.3	O	O	O	O	Jōetsu Shinkansen; ■ Jōetsu Line	Nagaoka
Kita-Nagaoka	北長岡	159.8	|	|	|	|		Nagaoka
Oshikiri	押切	164.2	|	|	|	|		Nagaoka
Mitsuke	見附	168.7	O	O	O	O		Mitsuke
Obiori	帯織	172.8	|	|	|	|		Sanjō
Tōkōji	東光寺	175.4	|	|	|	|		Sanjō
Sanjō	三条	178.9	|	|	O	O		Sanjō
Higashi-Sanjō	東三条	180.5	O	O	O	O	■ Yahiko Line	Sanjō
Honai	保内	184.3	|	|	|	|		Sanjō
Kamo	加茂	188.1	O	O	O	O		Kamo
Hanyūda	羽生田	192.2	|	|	|	|		Tagami
Tagami	田上	195.4	|	|	|	|		Tagami
Yashiroda	矢代田	199.1	|	|	O	O		Akiha-ku, Niigata
Furutsu	古津	202.2	|	|	|	|		Akiha-ku, Niigata
Niitsu	新津	205.4	O	O	O	O	■ Uetsu Main Line; ■ Banetsu West Line	Akiha-ku, Niigata
Satsukino	さつき野	206.9	|	|	|	|		Akiha-ku, Niigata
Ogikawa	荻川	209.2	|	|	|	|		Akiha-ku, Niigata
Kameda	亀田	214.1	|	|	|	O		Kōnan-ku, Niigata
Echigo-Ishiyama	越後石山	216.5	|	|	|	|		Higashi-ku, Niigata
Niigata	新潟	220.6	O	O	O	O	Jōetsu Shinkansen; ■ Hakushin Line; ■ Echigo Line	Chūō-ku, Niigata

== Rolling stock ==
=== Present ===
==== Takasaki–Yokokawa ====
- 211 series 4/6-car DC EMUs

==== Shinonoi–Nagano ====
- 115 series 2/3-car DC EMUs (Shinano Railway)
- 211 series 3-car DC EMUs
- E127-100 series 2-car DC EMUs
- 383 series 6-car DC EMUs (Shinano)

==== Naoetsu–Niigata ====
- 115 series 3-car DC EMUs (rapid only)
- E129 series 2/4 car DC EMUs (since December 2014)
- ET127 series 2-car DC EMUs (Naoetsu–Nagaoka, late night/early morning only)
- E653-1100 series 4-car DC/AC EMUs (Shirayuki, Ohayo-Shinetsu, Rakuraku-Train-Shinetsu)
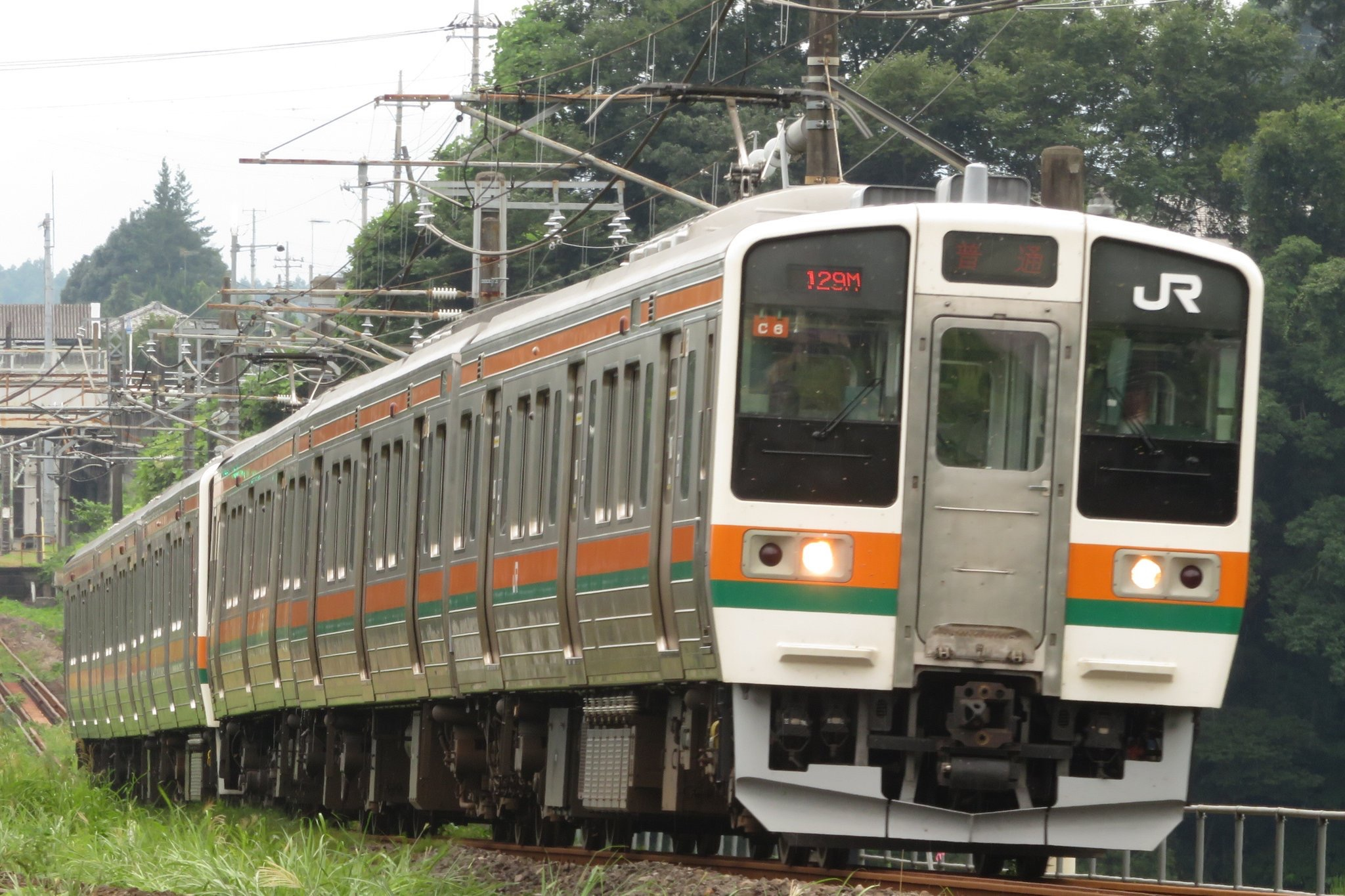
211 series in Takasaki area (Isobe - Matsuida)

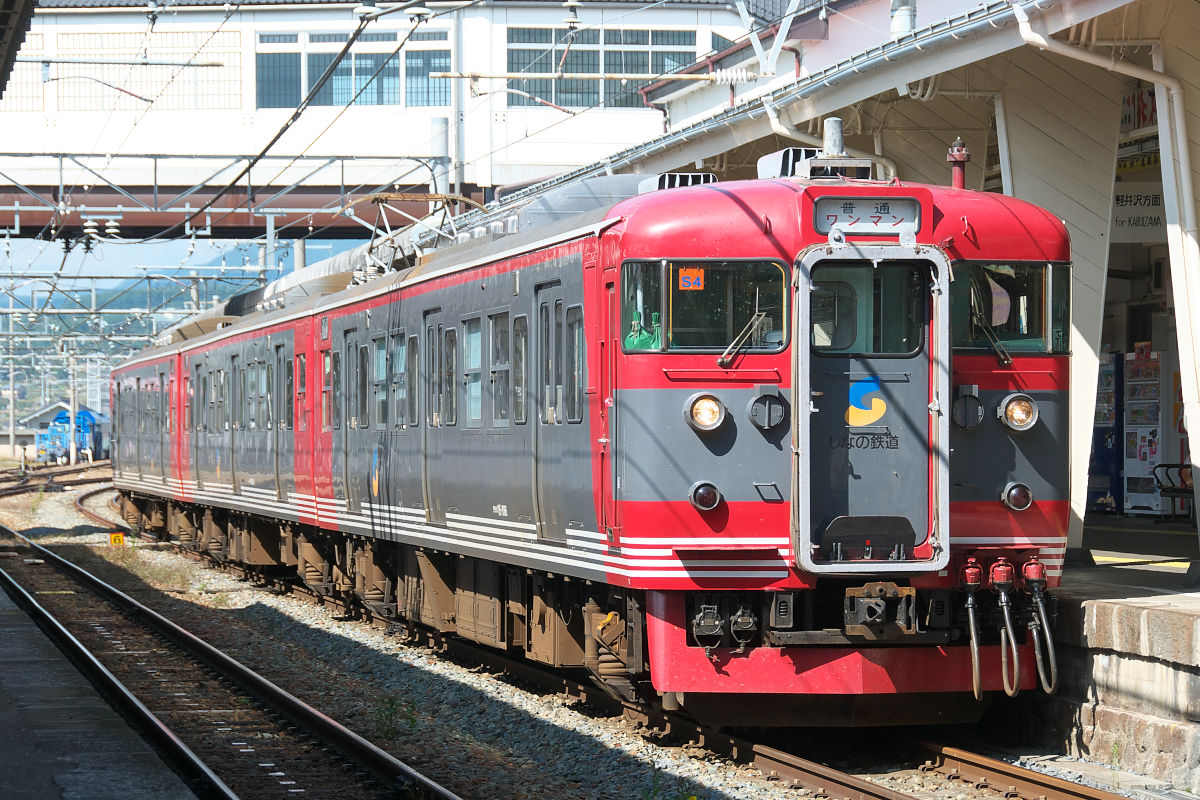
Shinano Railway 115 series

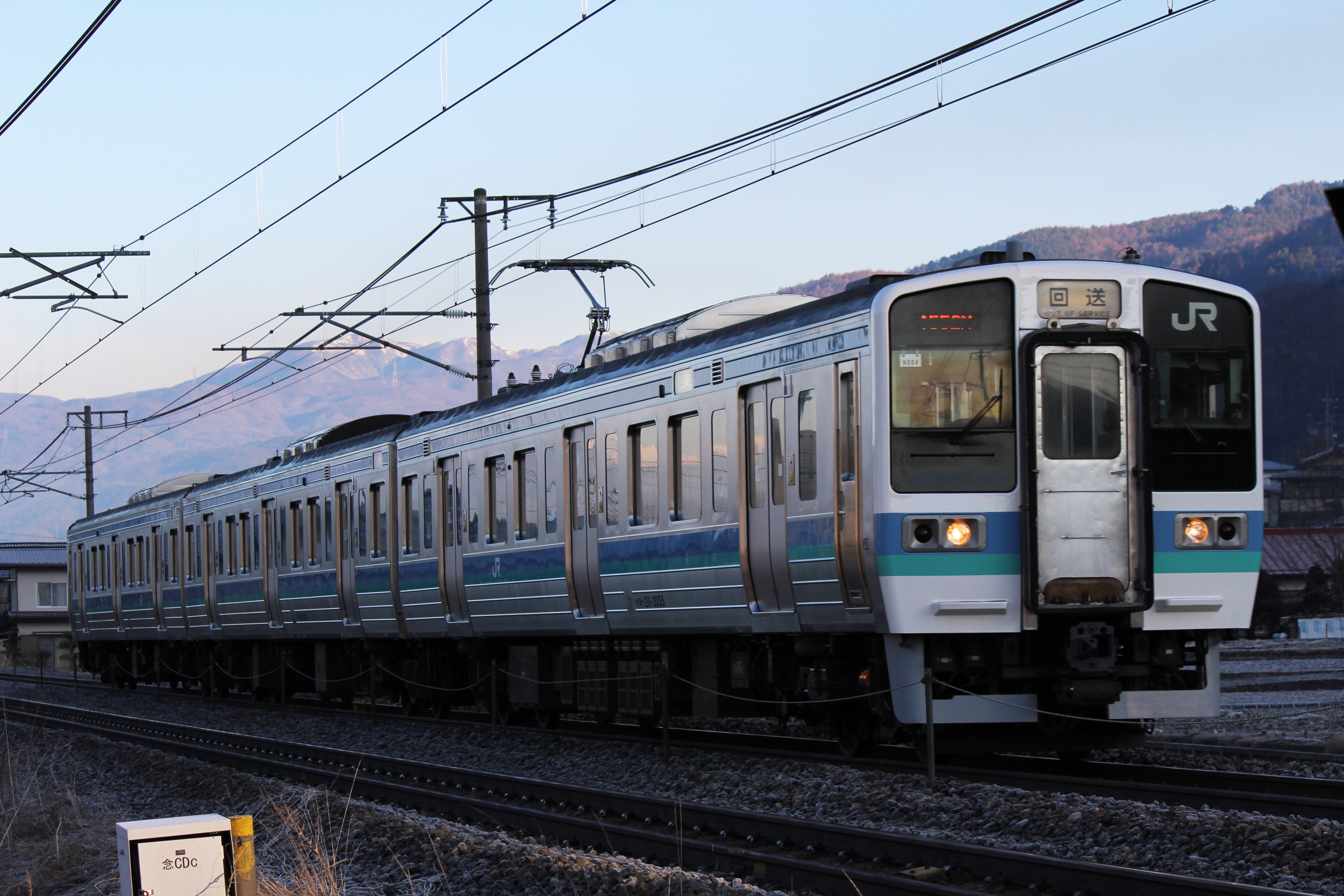
211 series in Nagano area

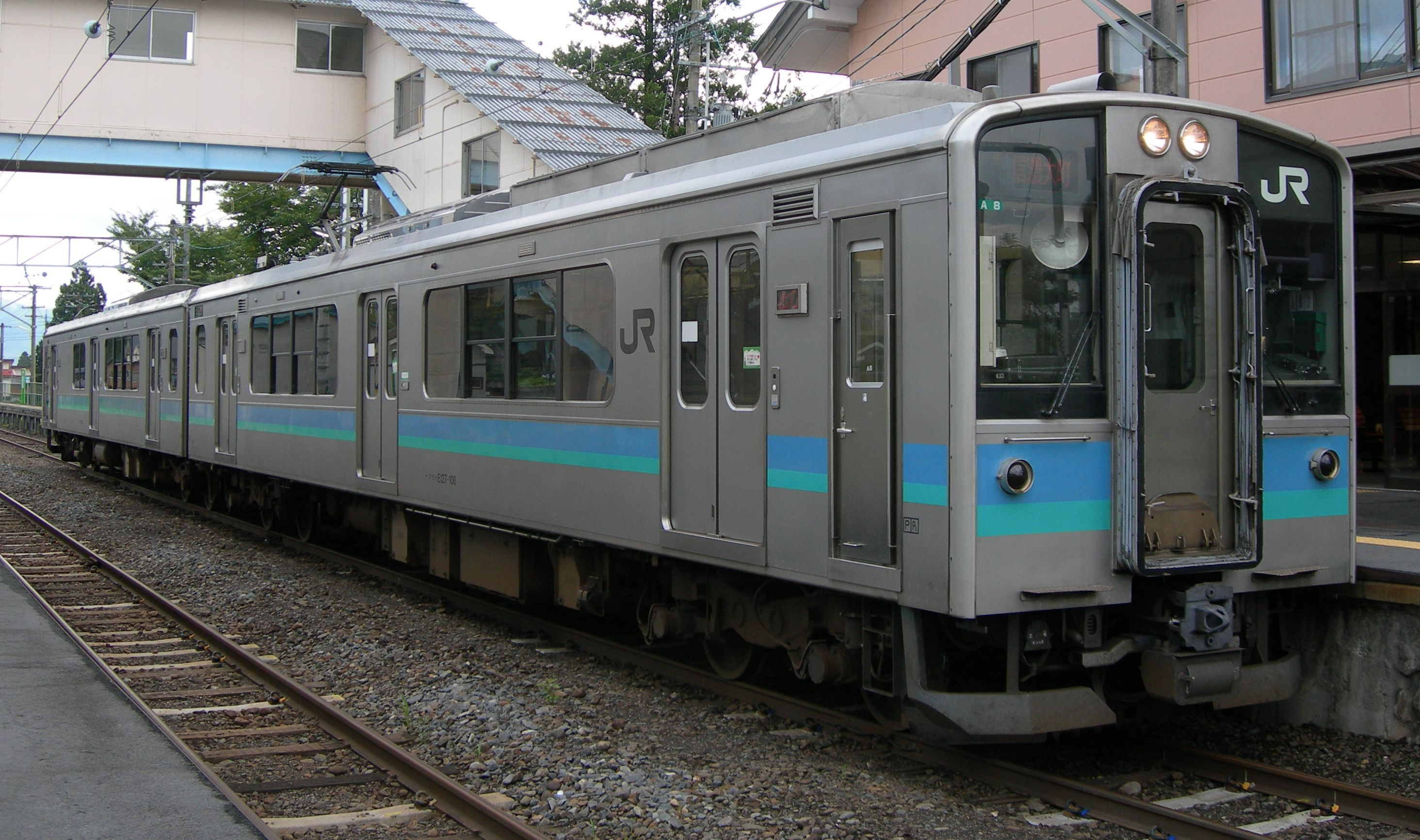
E127-100 series

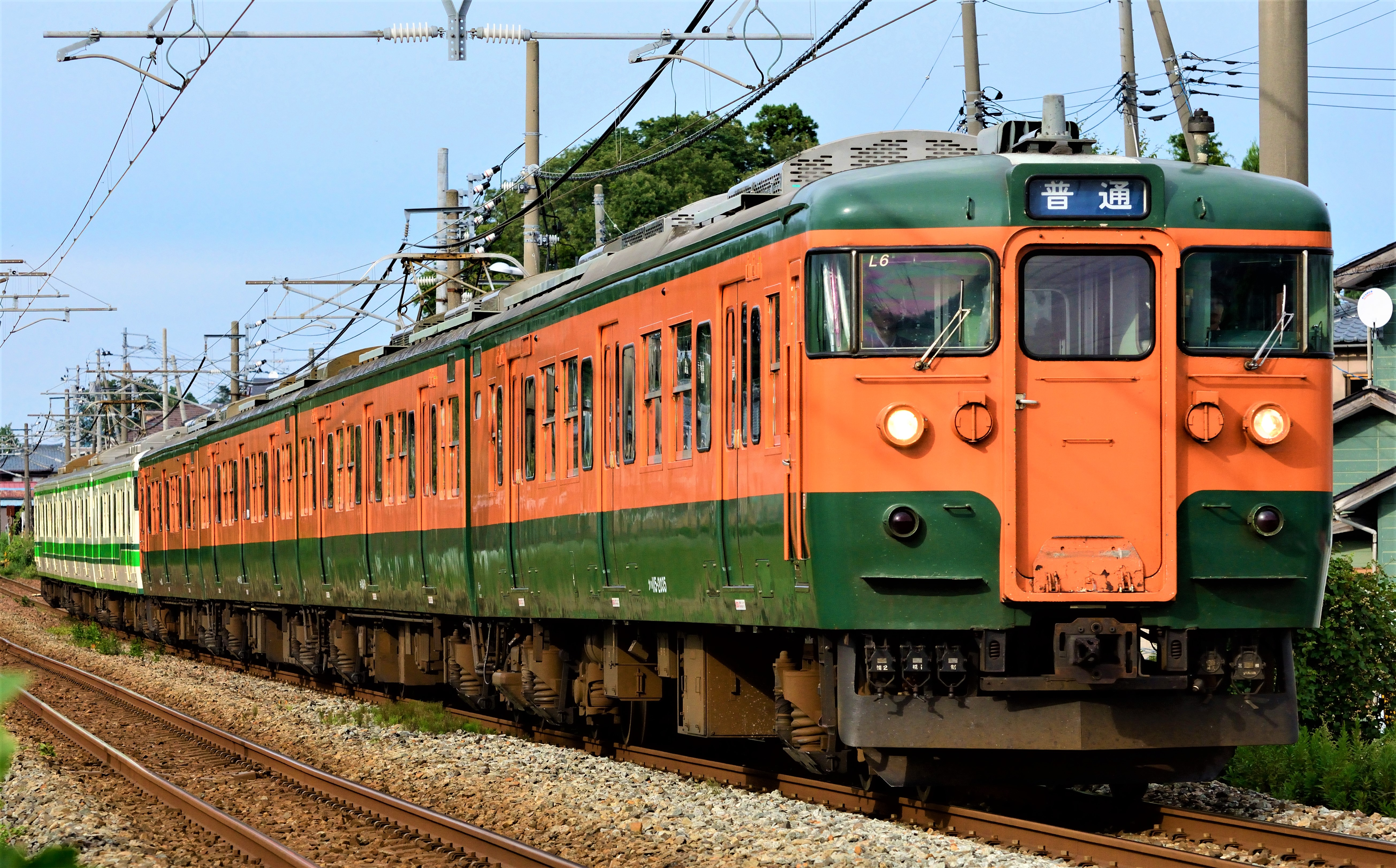
115 series in Niigata area (Furutsu - Niitsu)

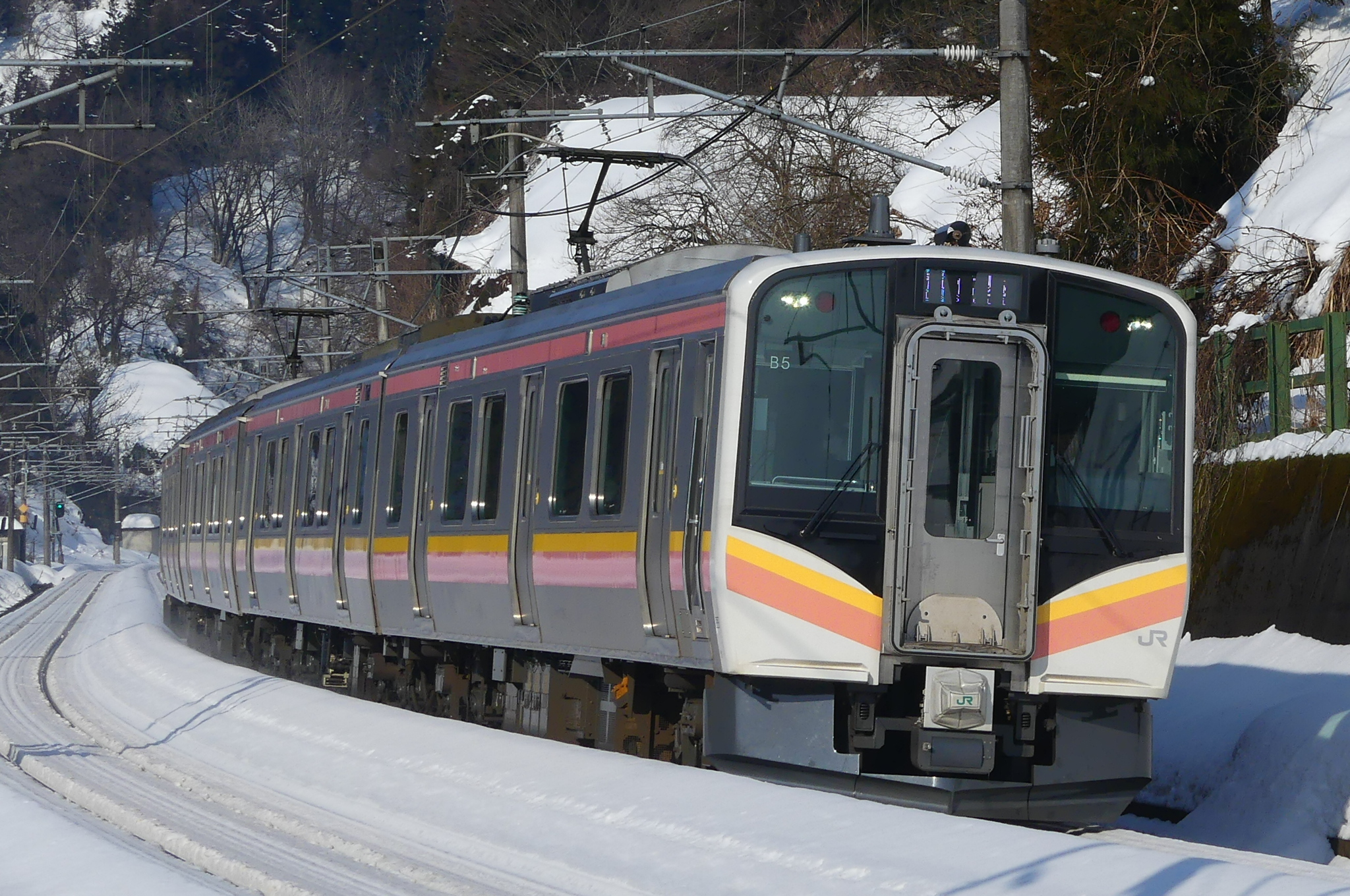
E129 series (Nagatori - Tsukayama)

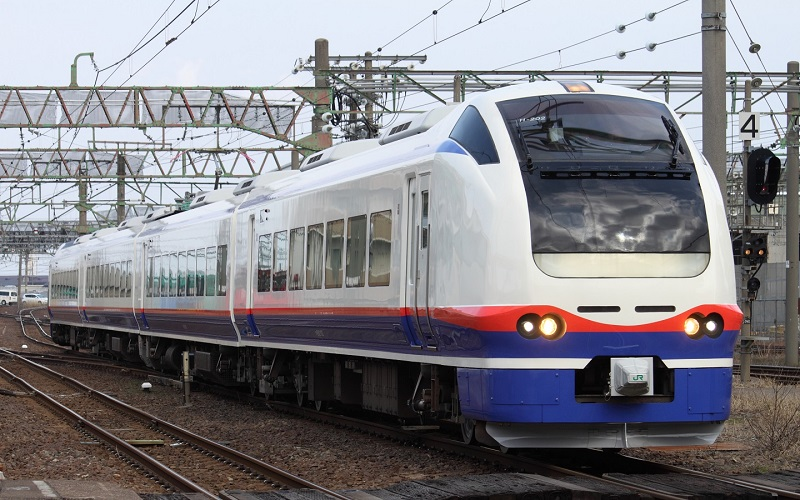
E653-1100 series (Naoetsu Station)

=== Former ===
==== Takasaki–Yokokawa ====
- 115 series (until March 2018)
- 107 series (until September 2017)

==== Naoetsu–Niigata ====
- 485 series (Until March 2017) - Hokuetsu, Kubikino, Ohayo-Shinetsu, Rakuraku-Train-Shinetsu, Moonlight Echigo, Minori, Hakuchō, etc.
- 489 series - Noto etc.
- 583 series (Until January 2013) - Kitaguni
- 181 series, 183 series - Toki etc.
- 165 series
- 70 series
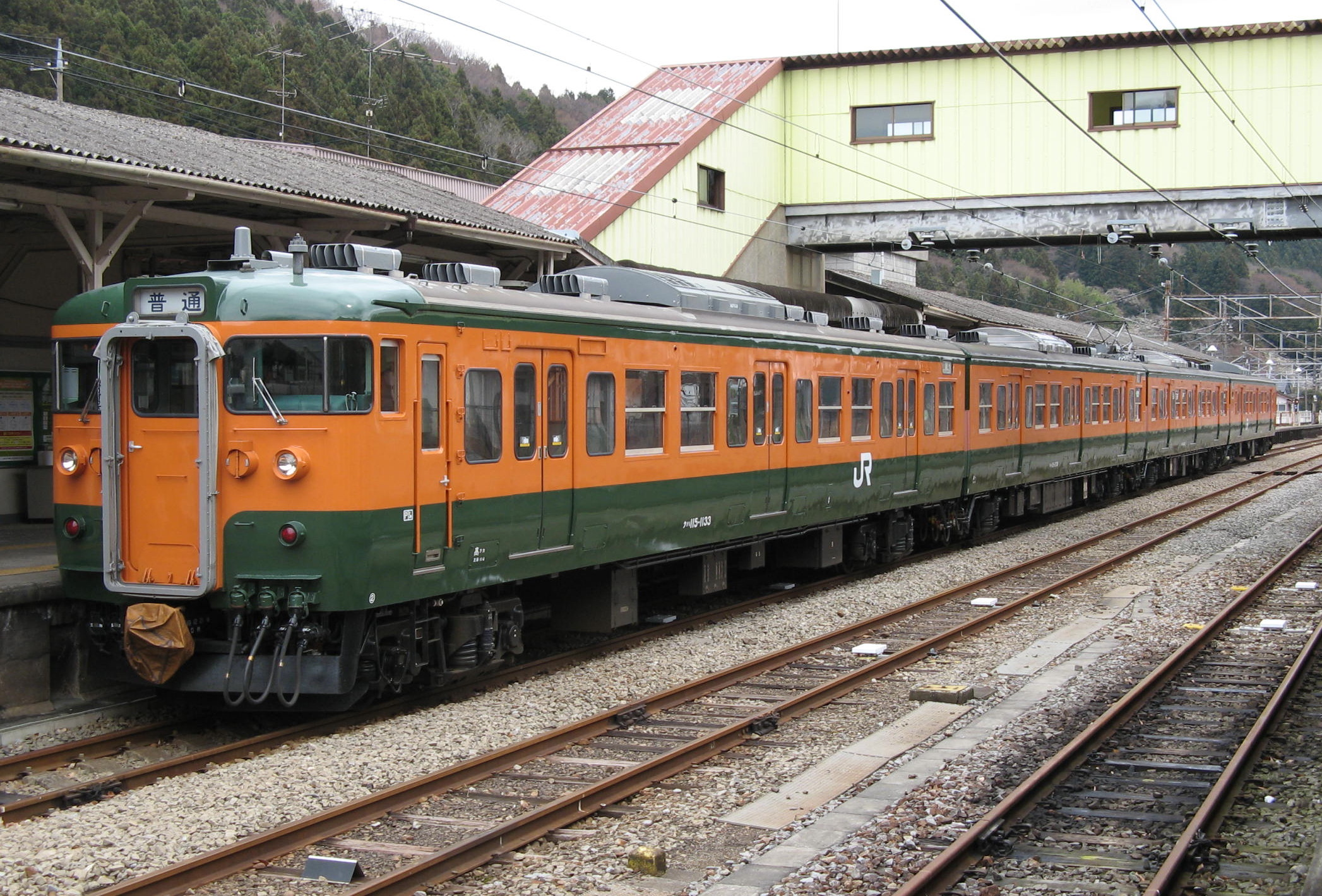
115 series (Yokokawa Station)

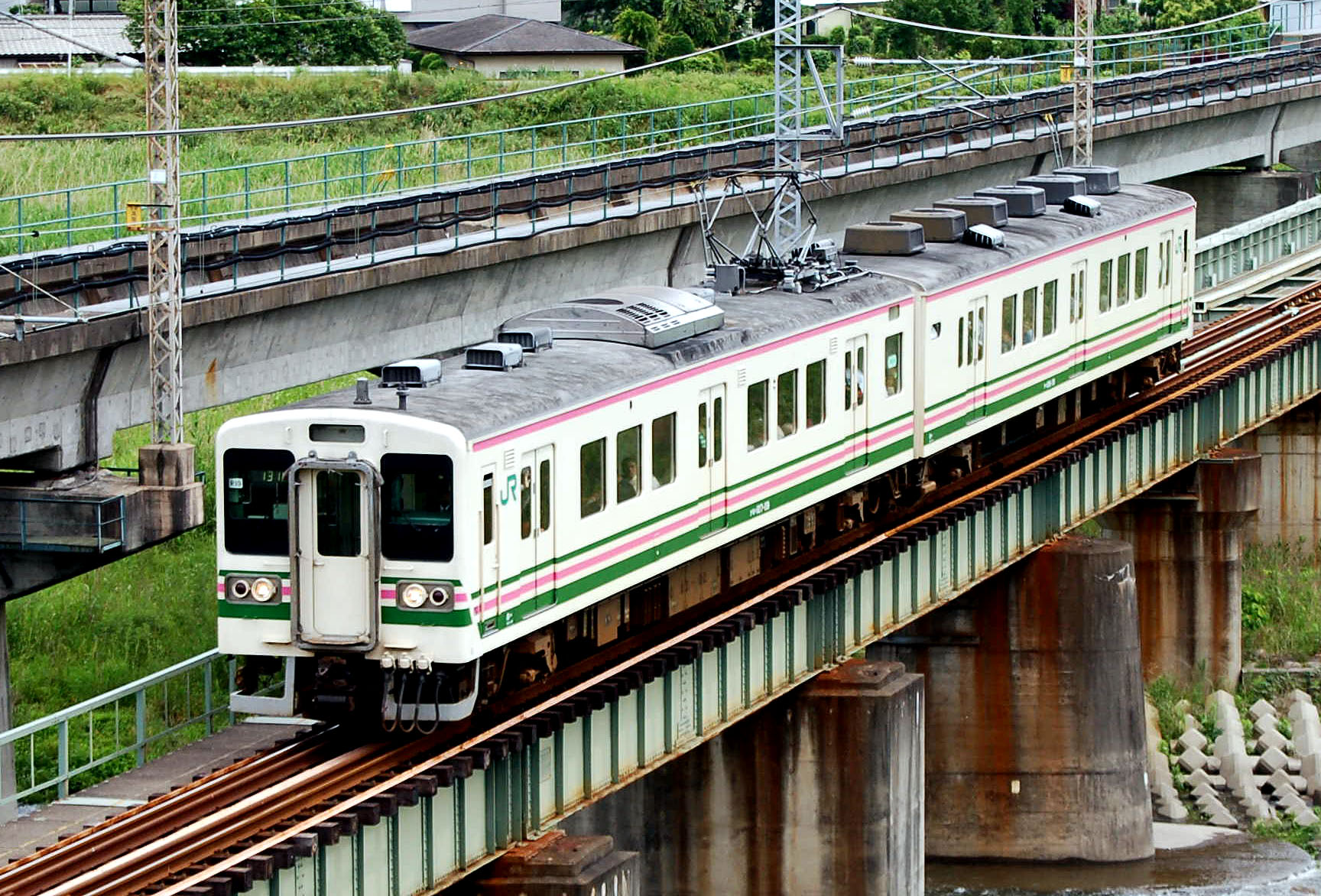
107 series (Gumma-Yawata - Annaka)

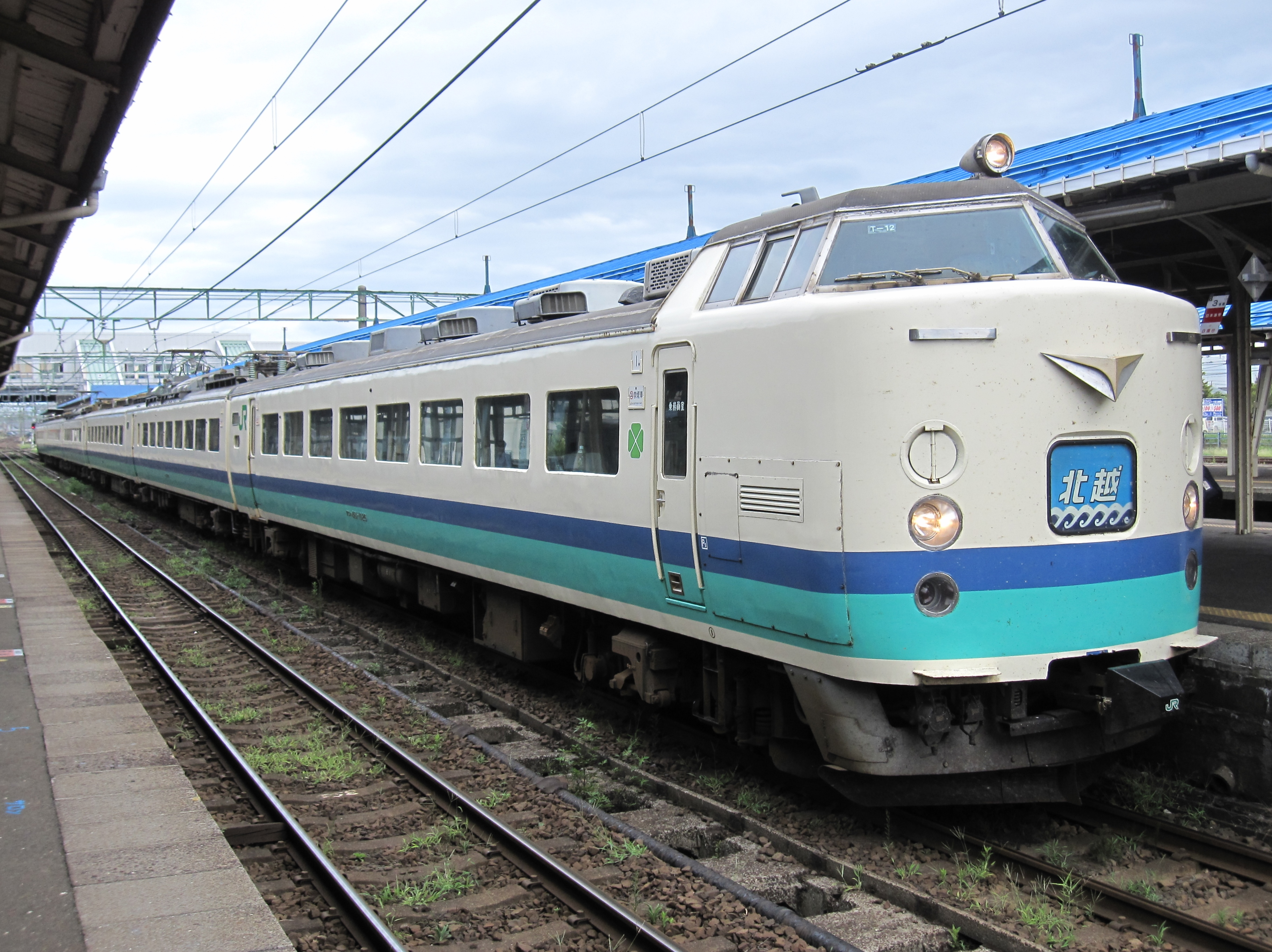
485-1000 series Hokuetsu (Naoetsu Station)

=== Future ===
- E131 series 3 Car EMUs - Shinonoi Line

An'naka, Gunma suggests that JR East should install a new station which will be located in between An'naka Sta. and Isobe Sta.

== History ==
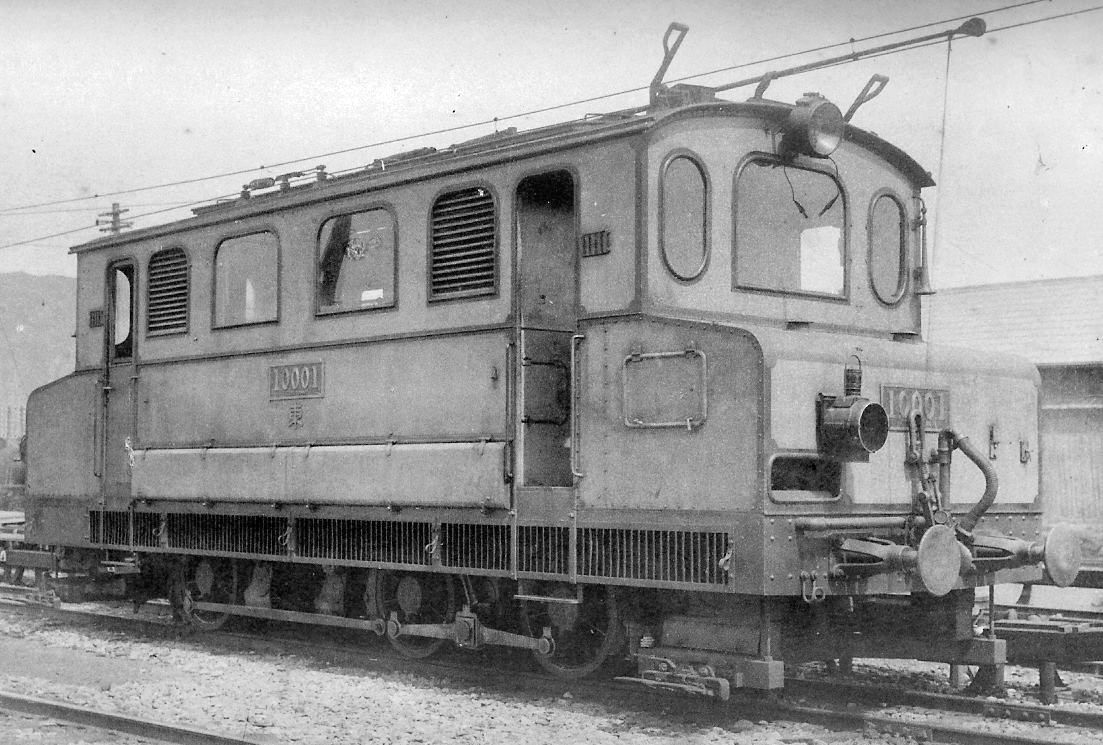
Abt rack railway loco used on the Usui Pass line; note the 'shoe' ahead of the nearest wheel to collect power via a third rail.

The Japanese Government Railways opened the Takasaki to Yokokawa section in 1885, the Naoetsu to Sekiyama section the following year, and the Sekiyama–Nagano–Karuizawa section in 1888. In order to surmount the 552 metre altitude difference between Yokokawa and Karuizawa (which are 10 km (6.2 mi) apart), it then constructed an Abt rack section through the Usui Pass, which opened in 1893, and was double-tracked for 1 km (0.62 mi) from Karuizawa to the top of the rack section. A horse-drawn tramway operated between Yokokawa and Karuizawa until the rack section opened.

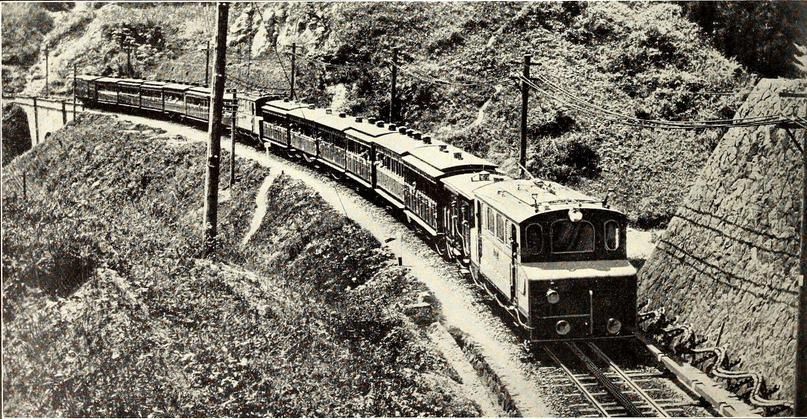
An electric train with both head and center locomotives in 1914

The Hokuetsu Railway opened the Naoetsu to Nagaoka section in 1897, extending the line to Niigata in 1904. That company was nationalised in 1907. In 1909, the Imperial Japanese Railway authorities invited bids for the electrification of the route. A German company was selected to provide the engines and General Electric supplied the turbines at the power station. In 1912, the rack section was electrified using third rail at 600 V DC, this being the first use of this method in Japan. The electrification allowed for the use of faster and longer trains which reduced journey times and also pollution from the steam engines. A link to archival footage of the rack section operation is available here

=== Double-tracking ===
The Karuizawa to Nagano section was double-tracked between 1917 and 1920, with the Nagaoka to Miyauchi section double-tracked in 1931, and the Niitsu–Kamo section in 1944. Double-tracking of the remainder of the Niigata to Naoetsu line was undertaken in sections between 1958 and 1973.

Double-tracking of the remainder of the Takasaki to Kaminagano line was undertaken in sections between 1963 and 1973, commencing with the replacement of the rack mechanism with an adhesion only electrified (1,500 V DC catenary) operation on the 1 in 15 (6.7%) grade. The rack equipment was initially kept as a contingency, and removed two months after the adhesion-only operation commenced and had proved its reliability.

The Kurohime to Myoko-Kogen section was double-tracked in conjunction with a realignment in 1980. The Mure to Kurohime section was also realigned and prepared for double-tracking (including new double-track size tunnels), but the second track was not laid.

=== Electrification ===
The Miyauchi to Nagaoka section was electrified in 1947 at 1,500 V DC in conjunction with the electrification of the Joetsu Line, with the Nagaoka to Niigata section electrified in 1962, the same year the Takasaki to Yokokawa section was commissioned to facilitate the extension to Nagano the following year via the new adhesion line through the Usui Pass mentioned above. The Nagano to Naoetsu section was electrified in 1966, and extended to Miyauchi in 1969.

=== Separation into sections ===
In 1997, following the opening of the Nagano Shinkansen, the Yokokawa to Karuizawa section was closed, and the Karuizawa to Shinonoi section transferred to the third-sector Shinano Railway.

On 14 March 2015, following the extension of the Hokuriku Shinkansen to Kanazawa, the Nagano to Naoetsu section was also spun off to the following two third-sector operating companies owned primarily by the respective prefectures and municipalities.

- Shinano Railway Kita-Shinano Line (37.3 km, Nagano to Myōkō-Kōgen)
- Echigo Tokimeki Railway Myōkō Haneuma Line (37.7 km, Myōkō-Kōgen to Naoetsu)

=== Station numbering ===
Station numbering was introduced on the Shinonoi–Nagano section from February 2025, with Shinonoi station being assigned SE09. Numbers increase towards Nagano.

=== Former connecting lines ===
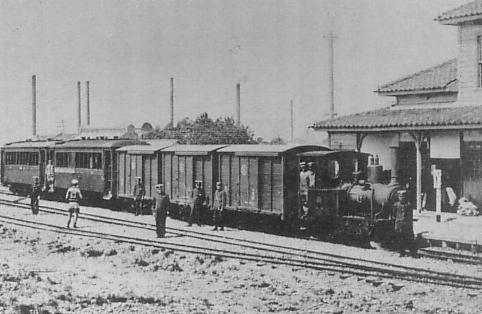
The Kubiki Railway prior to 1940

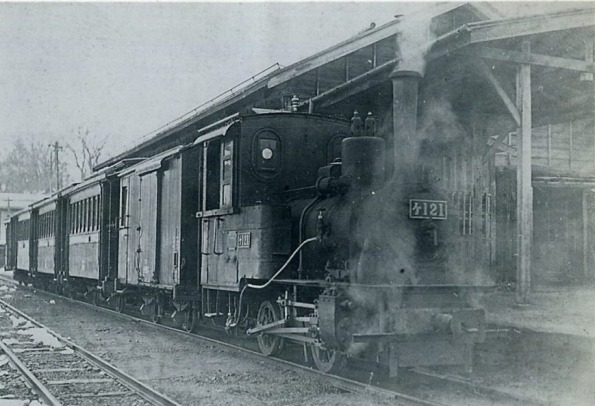
A train on the Uomuna line in 1937, prior to its conversion to 1,067 mm gauge

(Note - for the connections at stations between Karuizawa and Shinonoi, see Shinano Railway Line)

- Nagano Station: The Zenkoji Hakuba Railway Co. opened a 7 km (4.3 mi) line to Susohana Guchi in 1936. A proposal for the line to be extended to Hakuba on the Oito Line did not eventuate, and the line closed in 1944.
- Kuroi Station: The Kubiki Railway Co. opened a 15 km (9.3 mi) 762 mm (2 ft 6 in) gauge line to Uragawara between 1914 and 1916, with the line closing in 1971.
- Raikoji Station: The Nagaoka Railway Co. opened a 39 km (24 mi) line to Teradomari (on the Echigo Line) between 1915 and 1921. This company introduced Japan's first diesel railcar in 1928, and in 1951 electrified 31 km (19 mi) of the line at 750 V DC in 70 days, completing the balance the following year. Significant typhoon damage occurred in 1966, and in 1972, passenger services ceased between Raikoji and Nishinagaoka, with the entire line becoming freight-only three years later. The line closed in 1995.

The 13 km 762 mm (2 ft 6 in) gauge Uonuma Railway to Nishiojiya was opened in 1911, and nationalised in 1922. It was converted to 1,067 mm (3 ft 6 in) gauge in 1954, freight services ceased in 1960, and the line closed in 1984.

- Nagaoka Station: The Tochio Railway opened a 27 km 762 mm (2 ft 6 in) gauge line to Tochio and Yūkyūzan between 1915 and 1924. The line was electrified at 600 V DC in 1948, with this being raised to 750 V DC in 1956. CTC signalling was commissioned in 1961, freight services ceased in 1967, and the line closed between 1973 and 1975.
- Higashi Sanjo Station: The Echigo Railway Co. opened the 8 km line to Echigo Nagasawa in 1927, and was nationalised two months later. Freight services ceased in 1960, and the line closed in 1985.
- Kamo Station: The Kanbara Railway Co. operated a line to Gosen on the Ban'etsu West Line from 1923 until 2002.
