= Kuroi Station (Niigata) =

Railway station in Jōetsu, Niigata Prefecture, Japan

Kuroi Station 黒井駅
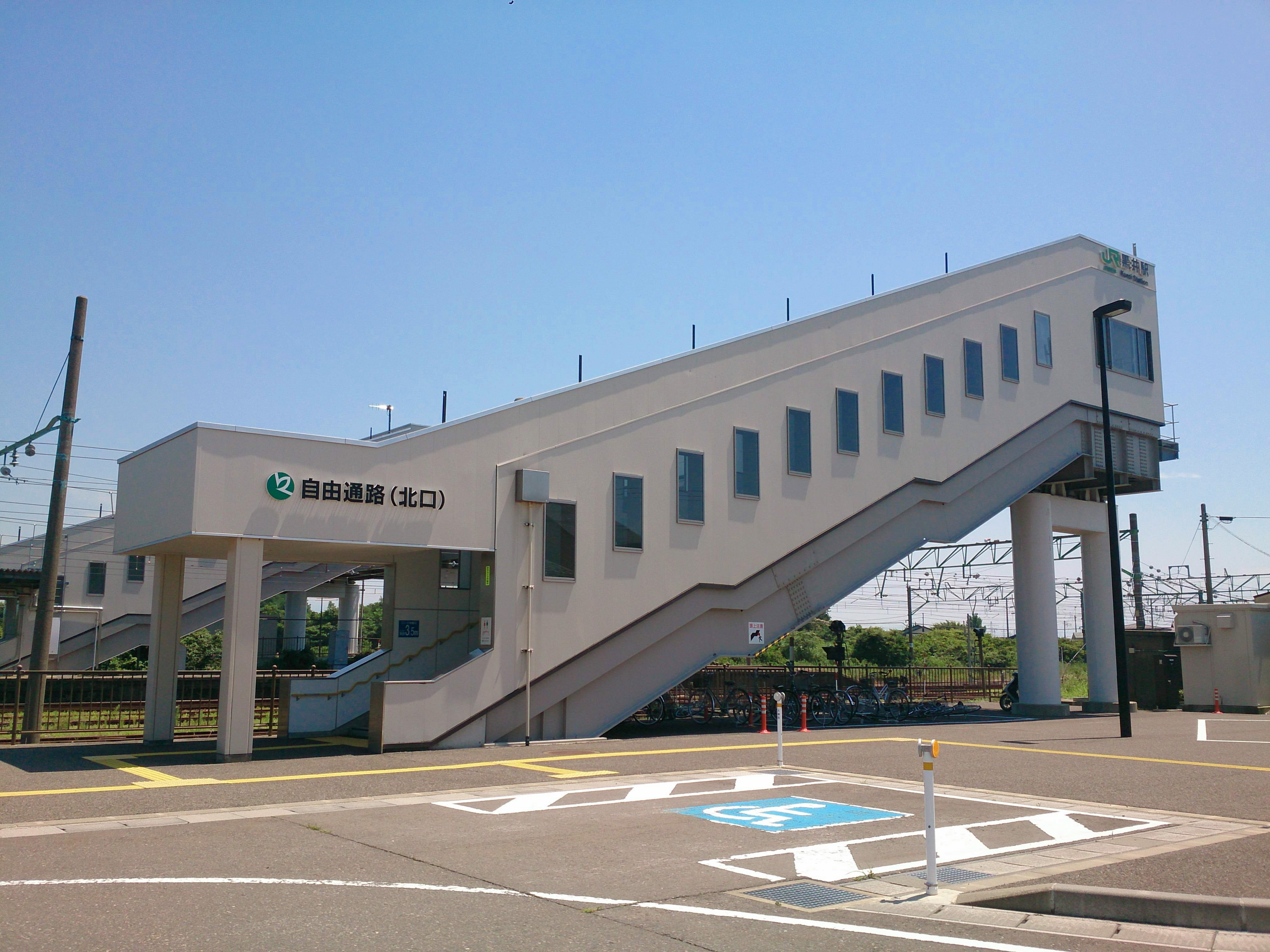
- North side of the station (July 2018)

General information
- Location: 2692-1 Kuroi-Nishihara, Jōetsu-shi, Niigata-ken 942-0013; Japan
- Coordinates: 37°11′01″N 138°16′03″E
- Operator: JR East; JR Freight
- Line: ■ Shinetsu Main Line
- Distance: 2.7 km from Naoetsu
- Platforms: 1 island platform
- Tracks: 2

Other information
- Status: Unstaffed
- Website: Official website

History
- Opened: 1 July 1902; 124 years ago

Passengers
- FY2010: 280

Services
Preceding station	JR East	Following station
Naoetsu Terminus	Shin'etsu Main Line Local	Saigata towards Niigata
Preceding station	Hokuhoku Express	Following station
Naoetsu Terminus	Hokuhoku Line Local (limited service)	Saigata towards Echigo-Yuzawa
Location
- Location within JR Shinetsu Main Line Location within Hokuhoku Line Location within Japan

Kuroi Station (黒井駅, Kuroi-eki) is a railway station on the Shinetsu Main Line in the city of Jōetsu, Niigata, Japan, operated by East Japan Railway Company (JR East). The station also has a freight terminal operated by Japan Freight Railway Company (JR Freight).

== Lines ==
Kuroi Station is served by the Shin'etsu Main Line, and is 2.7 kilometers from the terminus of the line at Naoetsu Station.

== Station layout ==
The station consists of one ground-level island platform with an elevated station building located above and at a right angle to the platform. The station is unattended.

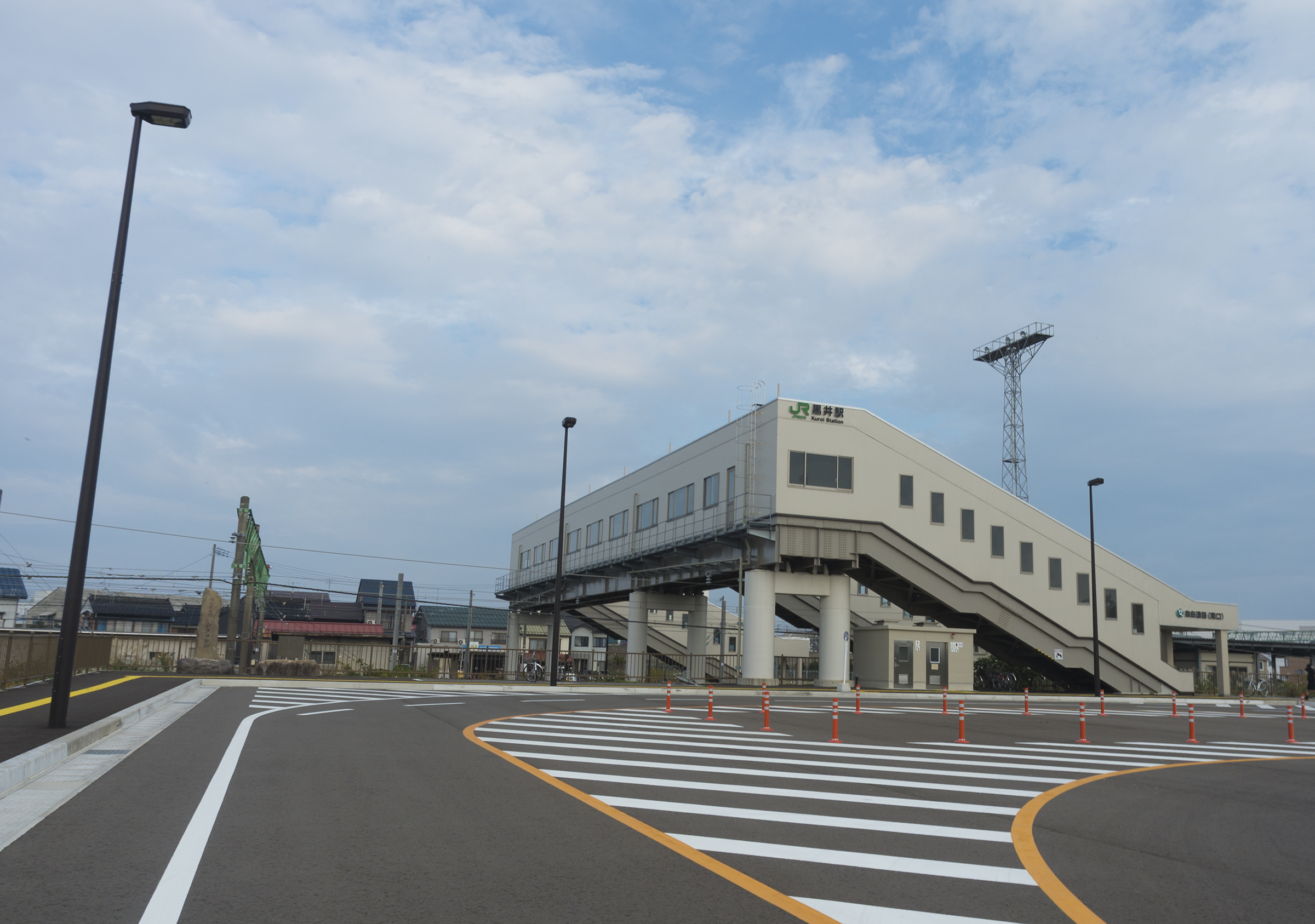
South side of the station (November 2013)

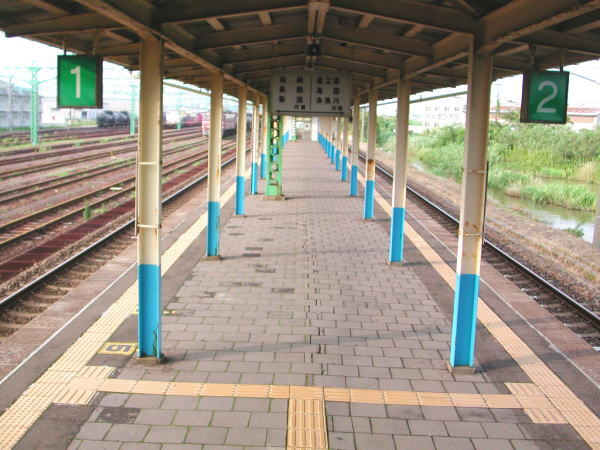
Platform

=== Platforms ===
1	■ Shin'etsu Main Line	for Nagaoka and Niigata
2	■ Shin'etsu Main Line	for Naoetsu

== History ==
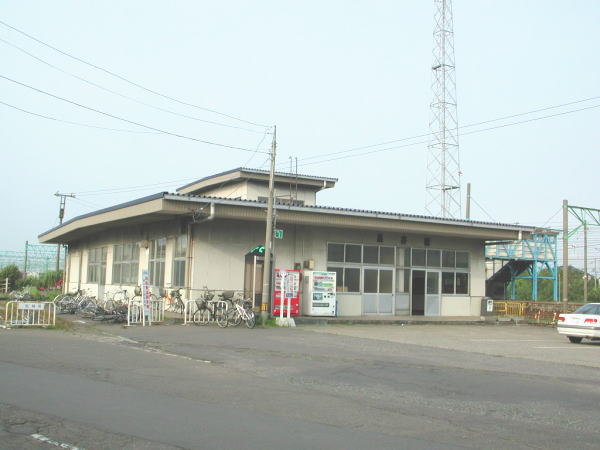
The station in July 2004, before rebuilding

The station opened on 1 July 1902, as a freight station of the Hokuetsu Railway, which was nationalized in 1907. Passenger service began on 1 September 1906. With the privatization of Japanese National Railways (JNR) on 1 April 1987, the station came under the control of JR East.

== Surrounding area ==
- National Route 8

== See also ==
- List of railway stations in Japan
