= Moonlight Echigo =

Japanese overnight train service

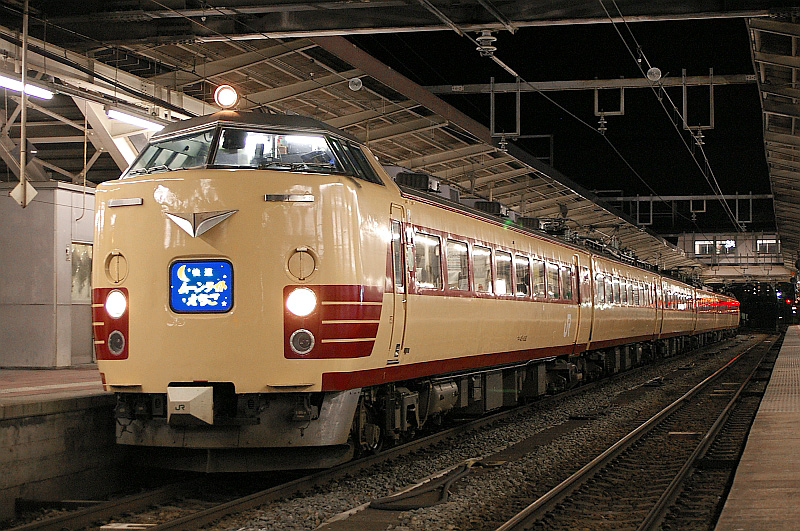
- A 485 series EMU formation on a Moonlight Echigo service, March 2007

Overview
- Service type: Rapid
- Status: Discontinued
- Locale: Japan
- First service: 1986
- Last service: 2014
- Current operator(s): JR East
- Former operator(s): JNR

Route
- Termini: Shinjuku; Niigata
- Stops: Ikebukuro, Ōmiya, Takasaki, Nagaoka, Mitsuke, Higashi-Sanjō, Kamo, Niitsu
- Line(s) used: Tohoku Main Line, Takasaki Line, Joetsu Line, Shinetsu Main Line

On-board services
- Catering facilities: None

Technical
- Rolling stock: 485 series EMU
- Track gauge: 1,067 mm (3 ft 6 in)
- Electrification: 1,500 V DC

The Moonlight Echigo (ムーンライトえちご) was a seasonal rapid overnight train service operated by East Japan Railway Company (JR East), which runs from Shinjuku to Niigata in Niigata Prefecture via the Takasaki Line, the Joetsu Line, and the Shinetsu Main Line. The name is taken from the Echigo Province, the old name of Niigata Prefecture. Service was reduced to run on a seasonal basis in 2009 and, while JR East has not formally announced its discontinuation, no services have operated since May 2014.

== Rolling stock ==
Moonlight Echigo services are formed of 6-car 485 series electric multiple unit (EMU) sets K1 and K2 based at Niigata Depot.

=== Past rolling stock ===
- 14 series coaches (June 1986 to September 1987)
- 165 series 3-car EMUs (from September 1987)
- 183 series EMUs (March 2010 to March 2012)
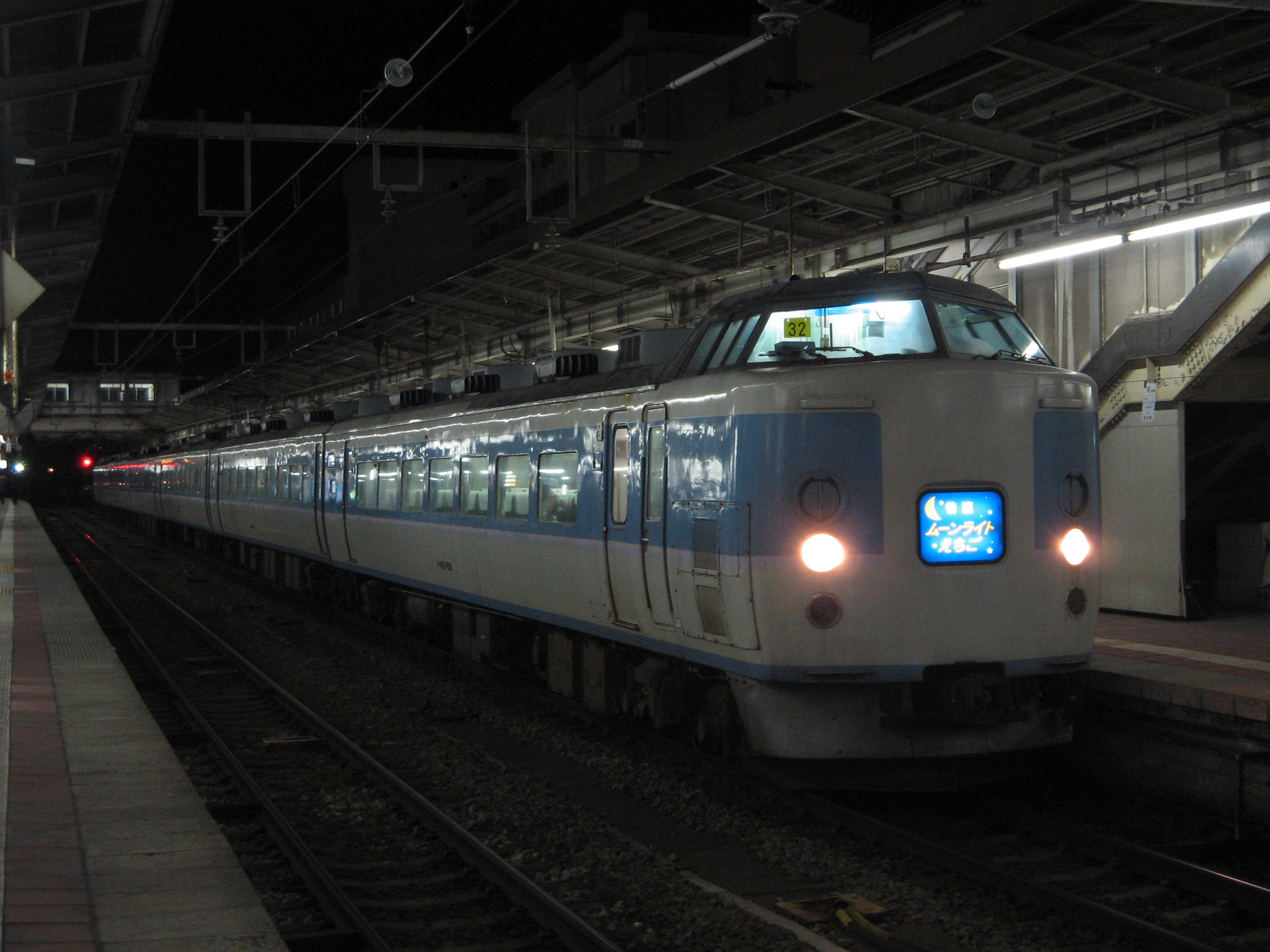
183 series, April 2010

== History ==
The service was first introduced on 30 June 1986, as a seasonal train named simply Moonlight (ムーンライト), to directly compete with overnight bus services between Tokyo and Niigata introduced the previous year. The locomotive-hauled rolling stock was replaced by EMUs from September 1987. The service became a regular daily service from March 1988.

From March 14, 2009, the daily Moonlight Echigo was discontinued and became a seasonal train running only during Japanese holidays. The last Moonlight Echigo service operated in May 2014, with the service excluded entirely from the subsequent summer schedule in 2014 and 2015.

== See also ==
- List of named passenger trains of Japan
- Seishun 18 Ticket
