= Gumma-Yawata Station =

Railway station in Takasaki, Gunma Prefecture, Japan

Gumma-Yawata Station 群馬八幡駅
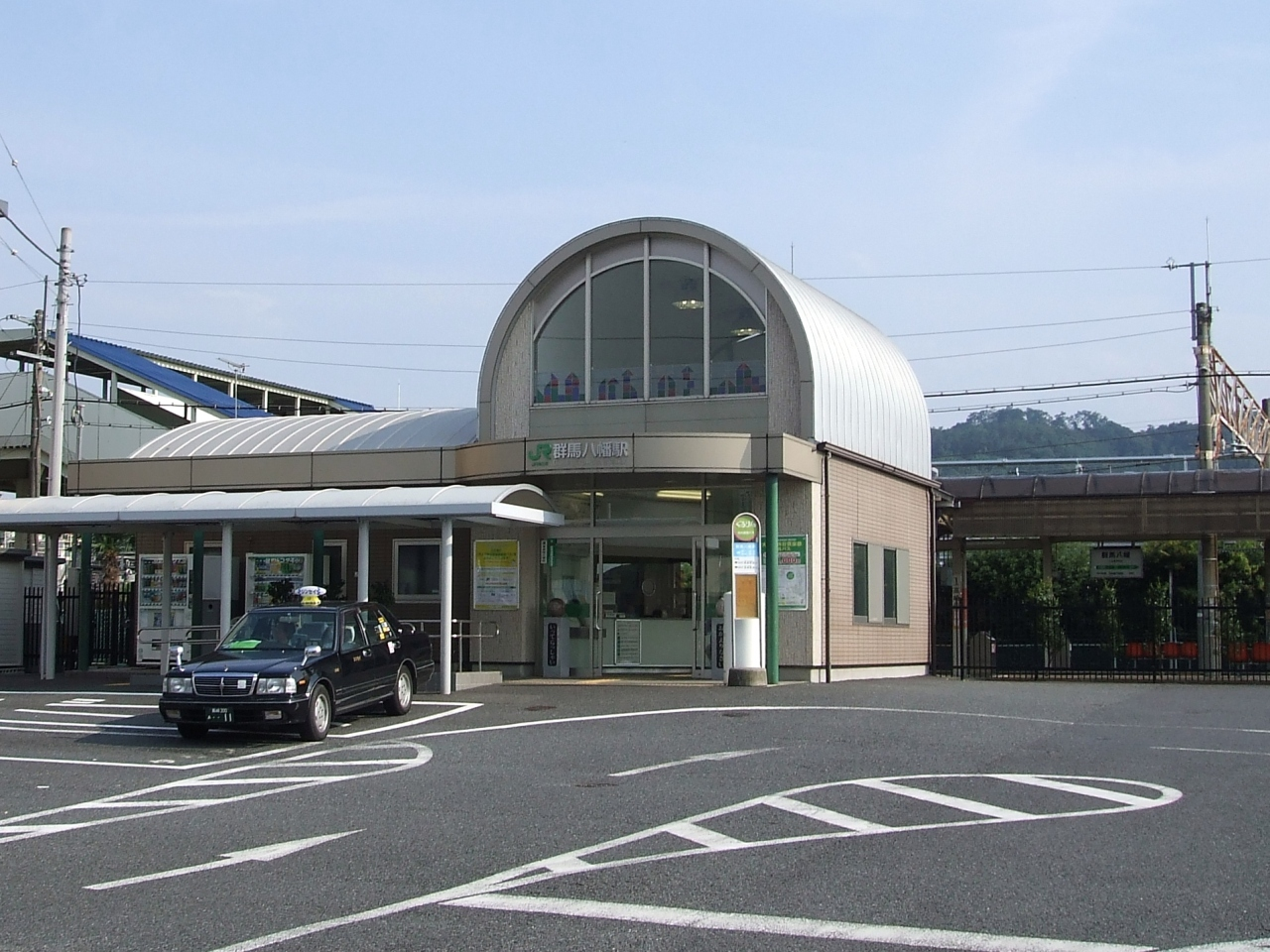
- Gumma-Yawata Station in 2008

General information
- Location: Yawatamachi, Takasaki-shi, Gunma-ken 370–0884; Japan
- Coordinates: 36.3376°N 138.9574°E
- Operator: JR East
- Line: ■ Shin'etsu Line
- Distance: 6.4 km from Takasaki
- Platforms: 2 side platforms

Other information
- Status: Staffed
- Website: Official website

History
- Opened: 15 October 1924

Passengers
- FY2019: 1197

Services
Preceding station	JR East	Following station
Annaka towards Yokokawa	Shin'etsu Main Line Takasaki – Yokokawa	Kita-Takasaki towards Takasaki
Location
- Location within Gunma Prefecture Location within Japan

Gumma-Yawata Station (群馬八幡駅, Gunma-Yawata-eki) is a passenger railway station in the city of Takasaki, Gunma, Japan, operated by the East Japan Railway Company (JR East).

== Lines ==
Gumma-Yawata Station is a station on the Shinetsu Main Line, and is located 6.4 km from the starting point of the line at Takasaki.

== Station layout ==
The station consists of two opposed side platforms connected to the station building by a footbridge. The station is attended.

=== Platforms ===
1	■ Shinetsu Main Line	for Takasaki
2	■ Shinetsu Main Line	for Yokokawa

== History ==
Gumma-Yawata Station opened on 15 October 1924. With the privatization of the Japanese National Railways (JNR) on 1 April 1987, the station came under the control of JR East. A new station building was completed in March 2004.

== Passenger statistics ==
In fiscal 2019, the station was used by an average of 1197 passengers daily (boarding passengers only).

== Surrounding area ==
- Usui River
- Gumma-Yawata Post Office
- Yawata Industrial Estate
- Daruma-ji Temple (達磨寺)
- Kannonzuka Kofun
- Tanpopo Gelato
- Yawata Community Center

== See also ==
- List of railway stations in Japan
