= Takasaki City University of Economics =

Higher education institution in Gunma Prefecture, Japan

Coordinates: 36°20′45″N 138°58′39″E

- 高崎経済大学
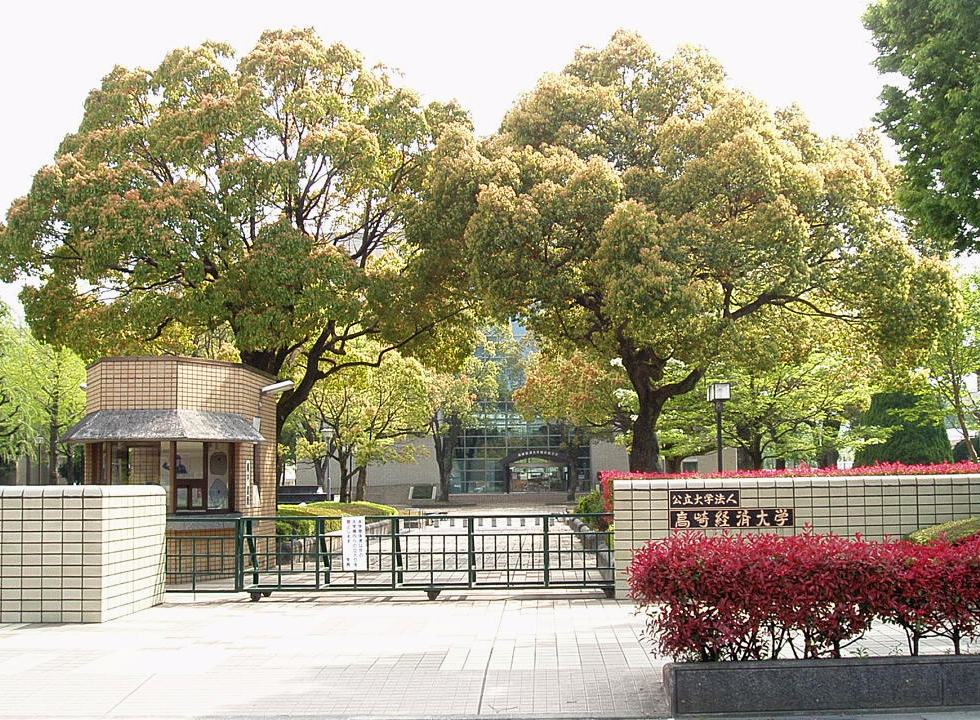
- Type: Public
- Established: Founded 1952; Chartered 1957
- President: Toshiyuki Yoshida
- Academic staff: 93 full-time
- Undergraduates: 4,023
- Location: Takasaki, Gunma, Japan
- Campus: Suburb
- Website: www.tcue.ac.jp

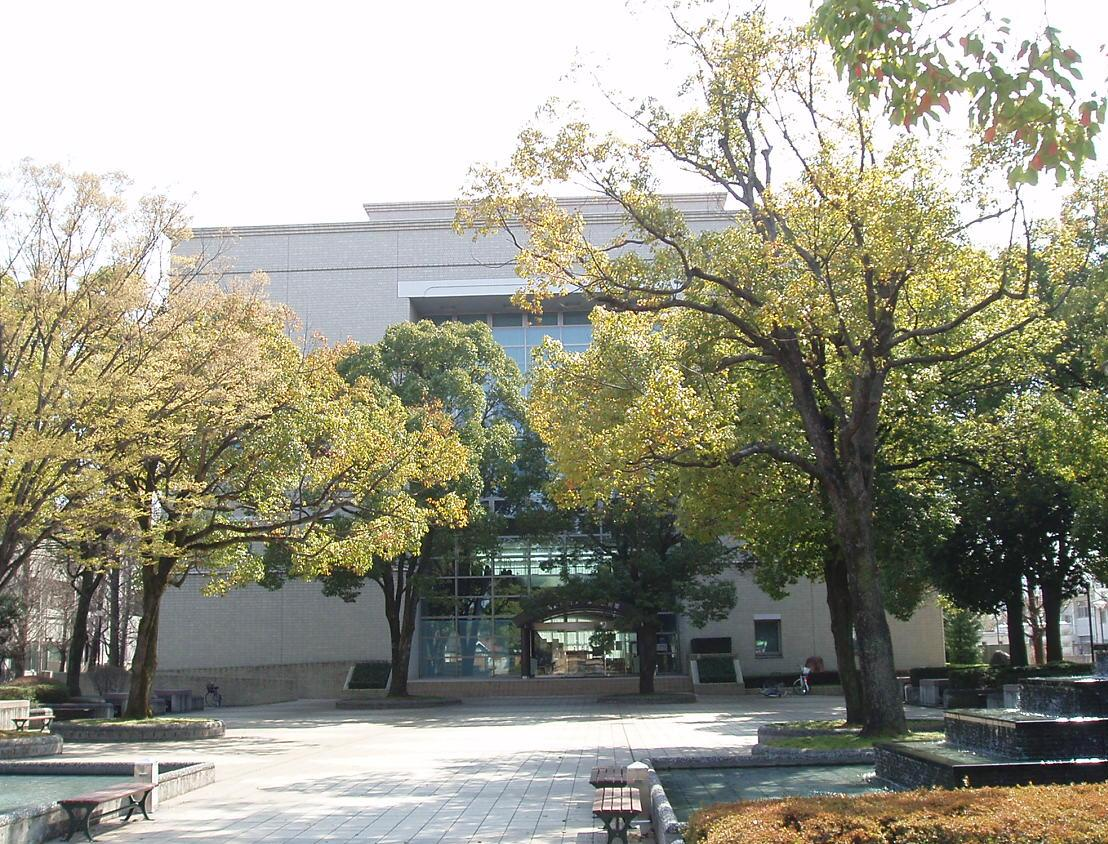
Library

Takasaki City University of Economics (高崎経済大学, Takasaki keizai daigaku) is a municipal public university in Takasaki, Gunma, Japan.

== History ==
After World War II, the national colleges in Gunma Prefecture were merged to constitute Gunma University in Maebashi. Takasaki City wanted to invite the faculty of economics of the Gunma University to occupy the facilities of former Gunma Youth Normal School, near Takasaki Castle. However, the school facilities were estimated too poor in quality, and no part of the Gunma University was settled in Takasaki.

In 1952 Takasaki City established its own municipal college - Takasaki City Junior College (高崎市立短期大学, Takasaki shiritsu tanki daigaku), a college with two-year courses in economics and business. In 1957 the college was developed into Takasaki City University of Economics. At first TCUE had one department: Department of Economics (Faculty of Economics). TCUE added departments and graduate schools as follows:

- 1964: Department of Business Management (a part of Faculty of Economics)
- 1996: Department of Regional Policy (Faculty of Regional Policy)
- 2000: Graduate School of Regional Policy (master's courses)
- 2002: Graduate School of Economics and Business Administration (master's courses)
- 2002: Graduate School of Regional Policy (doctoral courses)
- 2003: Department of Regional Development (a part of Faculty of Regional Policy)
- 2004: Graduate School of Economics and Business Administration (doctoral courses)
- 2006: Department of Tourism (a part of Faculty of Regional Policy)

== Undergraduate schools ==
- Faculty of Economics
  - Department of Economics
  - Department of Business Management
- Faculty of Regional Policy
  - Department of Regional Policy
  - Department of Regional Activation
  - Department of Tourism Policy

== Graduate schools ==
- Graduate School of Economics and Business Administration
- Graduate School of Regional Policy

== Institutes ==
- University Library
- Institute for Research of Regional Economy
- Information Center
- Regional Policy Research Center
