= Tōkōji Station =

Railway station in Sanjō, Niigata Prefecture, Japan

Tōkōji Station 東光寺駅
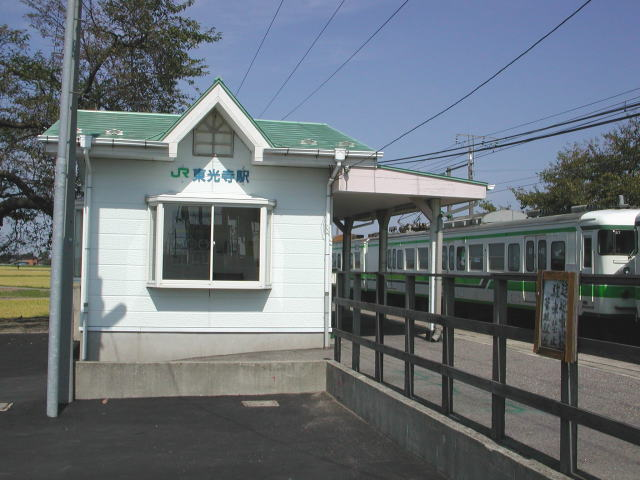
- Tōkōji Station, September 2004

General information
- Location: Kaneko Shinden, Sanjō-shi, Niigata; Japan
- Coordinates: 37.5929°N 138.9428°E
- Operator: JR East
- Line: ■ Shin'etsu Main Line
- Distance: 91.1 from Naoetsu
- Platforms: 2 side platforms
- Tracks: 2

Other information
- Status: Unstaffed
- Website: Official website

History
- Opened: 1 July 1953; 73 years ago

Services
Preceding station	JR East	Following station
Obiori towards Naoetsu	Shin'etsu Main Line Local	Sanjō towards Niigata
Location
- Location within JR Shinetsu Main Line Location within Japan

Tōkōji Station (東光寺駅, Tōkōji-eki) is a railway station in the city of Sanjō, Niigata, Japan, operated by the East Japan Railway Company (JR East).

== Lines ==
Tōkōji Station is served by the Shin'etsu Main Line and is 91.1 kilometers from the terminus of the line at Naoetsu Station.

== Station layout ==
The station consists of two ground-level opposed side platforms connected by a footbridge, serving two tracks. The station is unattended.

=== Platforms ===
1	■ Shin'etsu Main Line	for Higashi-Sanjō and Niigata
2	■ Shin'etsu Main Line	for Mitsuke and Nagaoka

== History ==
Tōkōji Station opened on 1 July 1953. With the privatization of Japanese National Railways (JNR) on 1 April 1987, the station came under the control of JR East.

== Surrounding area ==
The station is located in a rural area surrounded by fields.

== See also ==
- List of railway stations in Japan
