= Obiori Station =

Railway station in Sanjō, Niigata Prefecture, Japan

Obiori Station 帯織駅
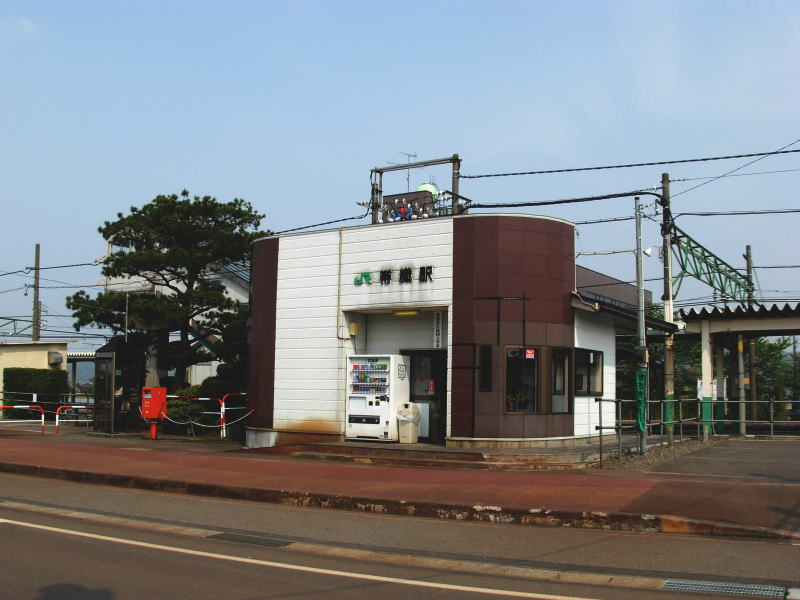
- Obiori Station, May 2007

General information
- Location: Obiori, Sanjō-shi, Niigata-ken 959-1117; Japan
- Coordinates: 37.5729°N 138.9286°E
- Operator: JR East
- Line: ■ Shin'etsu Main Line
- Distance: 88.5 from Naoetsu
- Platforms: 2 side platforms
- Tracks: 2

Other information
- Status: Unstaffed
- Website: Official website

History
- Opened: 16 June 1898; 128 years ago

Services
Preceding station	JR East	Following station
Mitsuke towards Naoetsu	Shin'etsu Main Line Local	Tōkōji towards Niigata
Location
- Location within JR Shinetsu Main Line Location within Japan

Obiori Station (帯織駅, Obiori-eki) is a railway station in the city of Sanjō, Niigata, Japan, operated by East Japan Railway Company (JR East).

== Lines ==
Obiori Station is served by the Shin'etsu Main Line and is 88.5 kilometers from the terminus of the line at Naoetsu Station.

== Station layout ==
The station consists of two ground-level opposed side platforms connected by a footbridge, serving two tracks. The station is unattended.

=== Platforms ===
1	■ Shin'etsu Main Line	for Sanjō and Niigata
2	■ Shin'etsu Main Line	for Mitsuke and Nagaoka

== History ==
Obiori Station opened on 16 June 1898. With the privatization of Japanese National Railways (JNR) on 1 April 1987, the station came under the control of JR East. A new station building was completed in 1992.

== Surrounding area ==
- Obiori Post Office

== See also ==
- List of railway stations in Japan
