= Oshikiri =

Oshikiri most commonly refers to:

== People ==
- Moe Oshikiri (押切 もえ; born 1979), Japanese model and designer
- Toru Oshikiri, a fictional character created by Junji Ito

== Places ==
- Oshikiri Station, a railway station in the city of Nagaoka, Niigata, Japan

== Others ==
- Oshikiri (film)
