= Mitsuke =

Mitsuke 見附市
- City
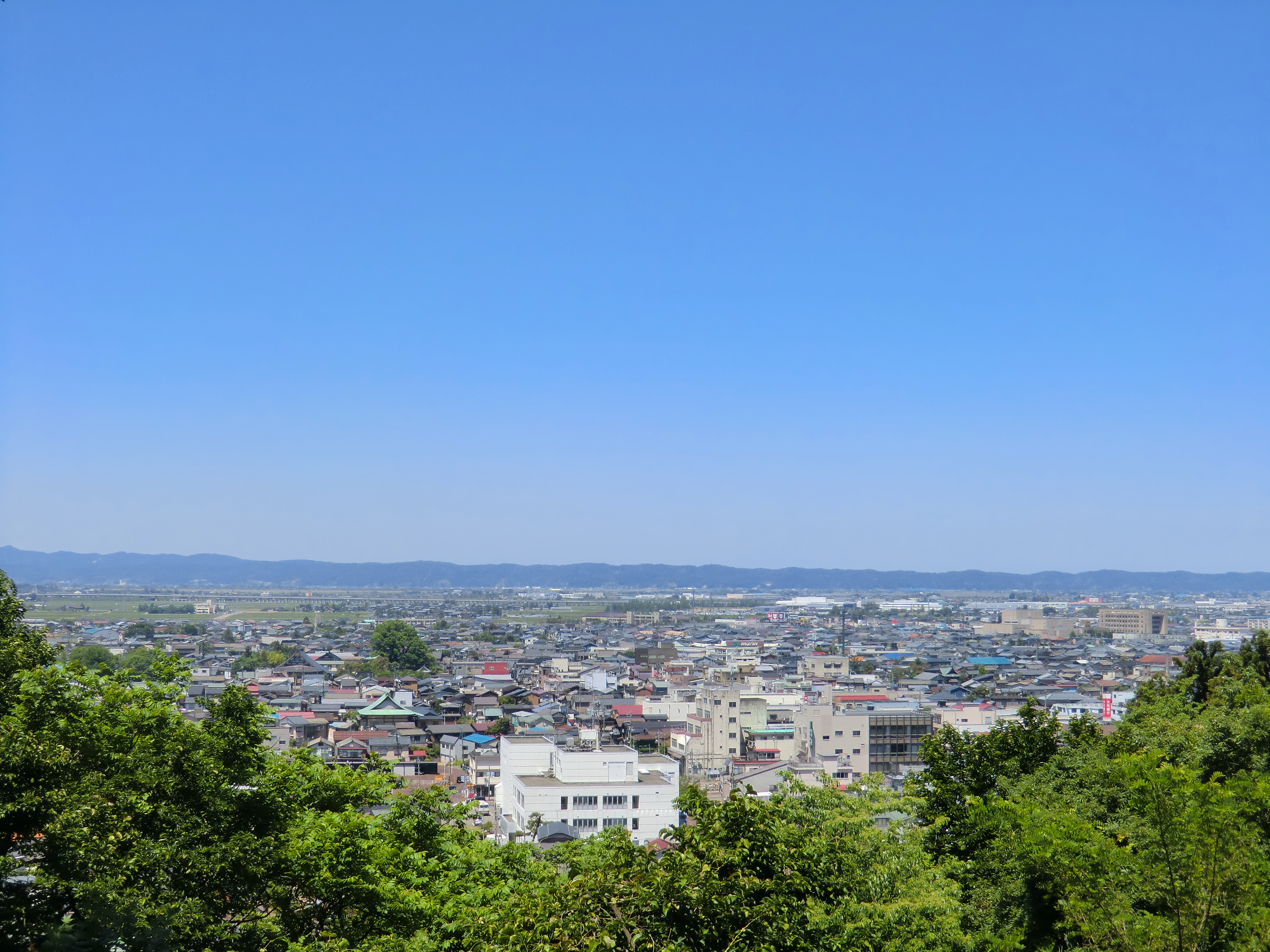
- Mitsuke from Kannonyama

- Flag Emblem

- Location of Mitsuke in Niigata Prefecture

- Coordinates: 37°31′53.7″N 138°54′45.9″E
- Country: Japan
- Region: Chūbu (Kōshin'etsu) (Hokuriku)
- Prefecture: Niigata

Government
  - Mayor: Tokio Kusumi

Area
  - Total: 77.91 km^{2} (30.08 sq mi)

Population (December 31, 2020)
  - Total: 39,908
  - Density: 512.2/km^{2} (1,327/sq mi)
- Time zone: UTC+9 (Japan Standard Time)
- Tree: Prunus mume
- Phone number: 0258-62-1700
- Address: 2-1-1 Showa-cho, Mitsuke-shi, Niigata-ken 954-8686
- Website: Official website

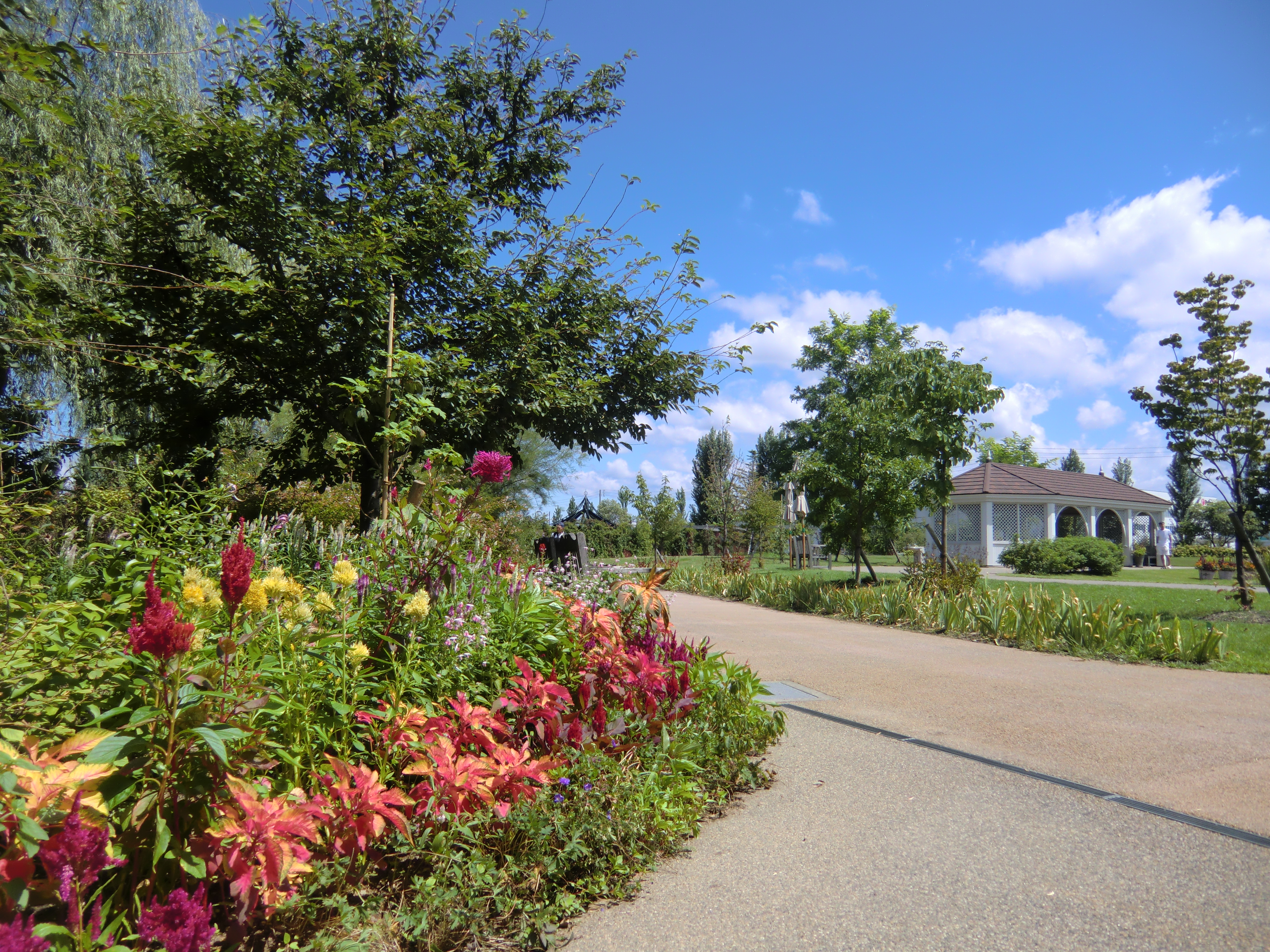
Mitsuke English Gardens

Mitsuke (見附市, Mitsuke-shi) is a city located in Niigata Prefecture, Japan. As of 31 December 2020, the city had an estimated population of 39,908 in 15,139 households, and a population density of 510 persons per km^{2}. The total area of the city is 77.01 square kilometres (29.73 sq mi), making it the smallest city in Niigata Prefecture in terms of area.

== Geography ==
Mitsuke is located in an inland region near the geographical centre of Niigata Prefecture, it has a monument called the "Navel of Niigata" (新潟のへそ, Niigata no heso). The city is located approximately 50 kilometers from the prefectural capital at Niigata and 300 kilometers from central Tokyo. The Kariyata River divides the center of the city into northern and southern districts before joining the Shinano River just outside the city borders. The main population center, former Mitsuke-cho, is located on the northern bank of the river and was formerly subject to frequent flooding. The eastern part of the city is a hilly area, and the western part is in the plains. The city extends from 11.5 kilometers from east-to-west by 14.7 kilometers from north-to-south.

The highest elevation is 300 meters above sea level, and the lowest is 10 meters above sea level. Over 50% of the city area is farmland, mostly in the northern part of the city.

=== Surrounding municipalities ===
Niigata Prefecture

- Nagaoka
- Sanjō

== Climate ==
Mitsuke has a humid subtropical climate (Köppen Cfa) characterized by warm, wet summers and cold winters with heavy snowfall. The average annual temperature in Mitsuke is 12.7 °C. The average annual rainfall is 2176 mm with September as the wettest month. The temperatures are highest on average in August, at around 26.1 °C, and lowest in January, at around 0.6 °C.

== Demographics ==
Per Japanese census data, the population of Mitsuke has remained relatively steady over the past 60 years.

Historical population
Year	Pop.	±%
1960	40,443	—
1970	41,059	+1.5%
1980	41,833	+1.9%
1990	43,116	+3.1%
2000	43,526	+1.0%
2010	41,862	−3.8%
2020	39,237	−6.3%

== History ==
The area of present-day Mitsuke was part of ancient Echigo Province. During the Edo period the area was divided between Nagaoka Domain, Muramatsu Domain and Shibata Domain under the Tokugawa shogunate. After the start of the Meiji period, the area was organised as part of Minamikanbara District, Niigata. The town of Mitsuke was established on April 1, 1887 with the creation of the modern municipalities system. It was raised to city status on March 31, 1954.

== Government ==
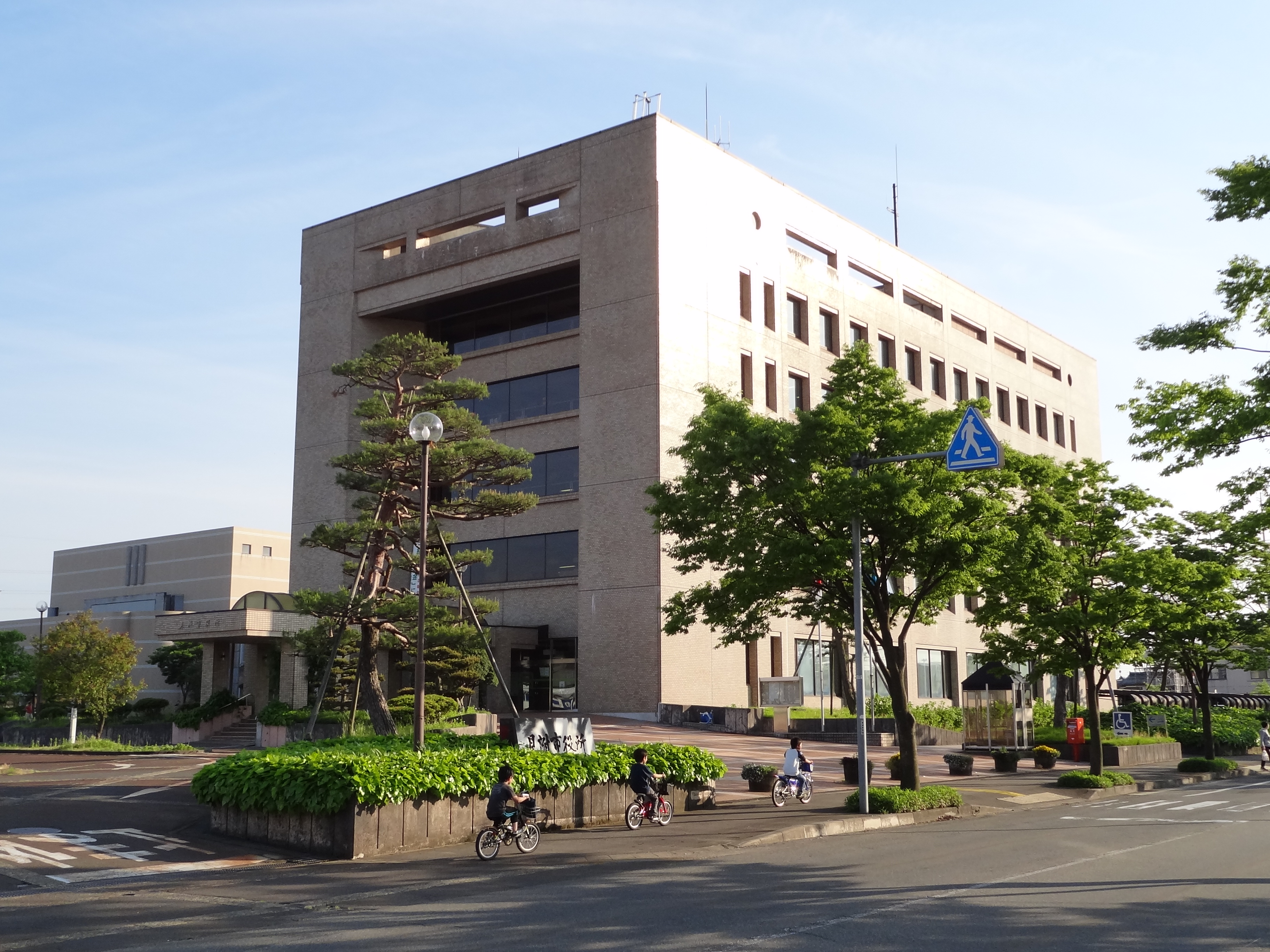
Mitsuke City Hall

Mitsuke has a mayor-council form of government with a directly elected mayor and a unicameral city legislature of 17 members. Mitsuke contributes one member to the Niigata Prefectural Assembly. In terms of national politics, the city is part of Niigata 4th district of the lower house of the Diet of Japan.

== Economy ==
Mitsuke was traditionally known for its silk weaving industry. The city is now known for the production of knitted and synthetic fabrics. The main agricultural products are rice and tobacco. The Mitsuke Oil Fields were once one of the most productive petroleum deposits in Japan. Mitsuke is the home of Canon Tokki Corporation. This is one of the world market leaders for vacuum machines for the production of OLED screens.

== Education ==
Mitsuke has eight public elementary schools and four public middle schools operated by the city government. There is one public high school operated by the Niigata Prefectural Board of Education and one private high school. The prefecture, also operates one special education school for the handicapped.

== Transportation ==
=== Railway ===
JR East - Shin'etsu Main Line

- Mitsuke

=== Highway ===
- National Route 8

== Local attractions ==
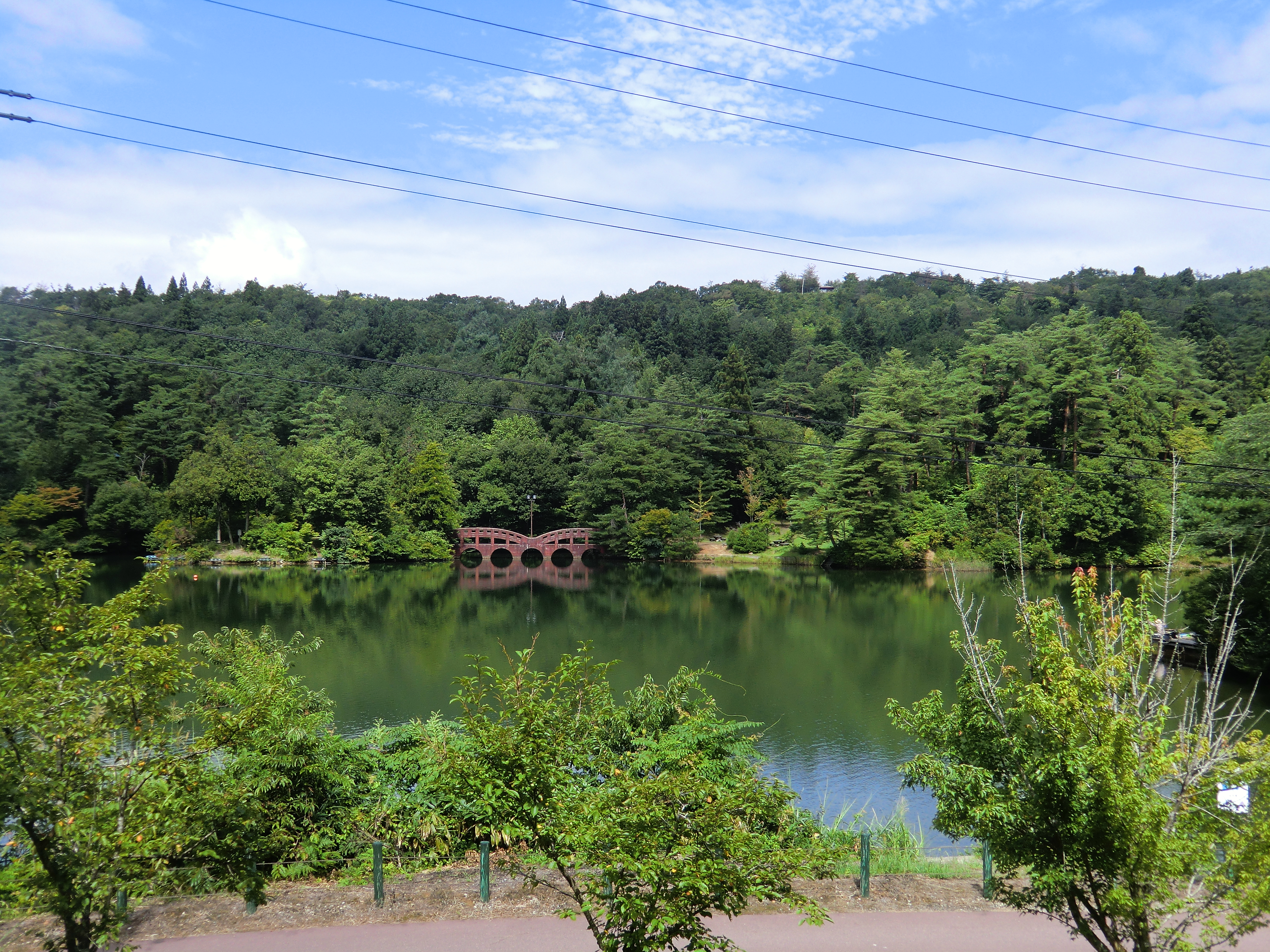
Ohirabayashi Park

- Mimitori Site, National Historic Site
