= Tsubame, Niigata =

Tsubame 燕市
- City
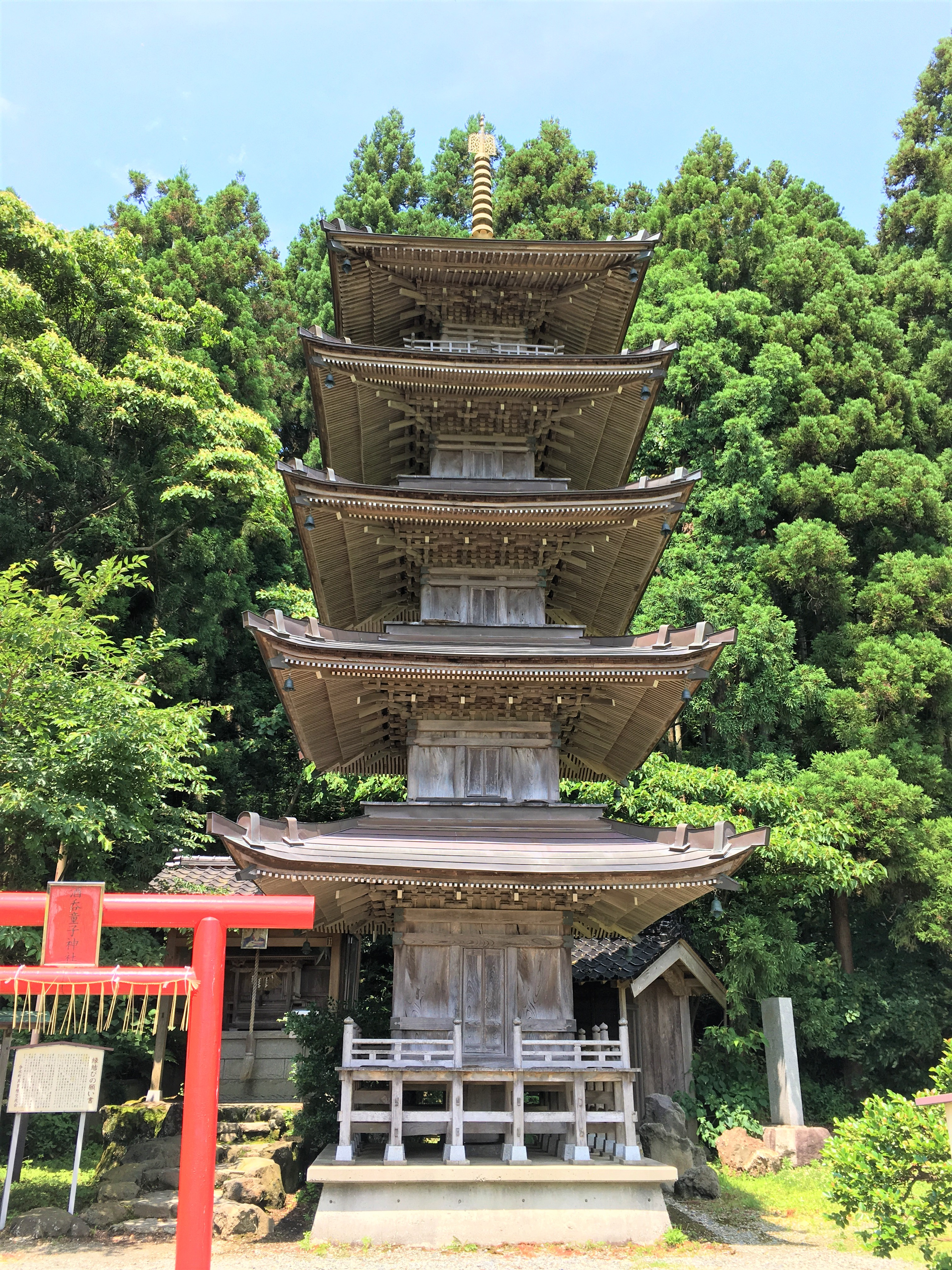
- Shutendoji Shrine

- Flag Seal

- Location of Tsubame in Niigata Prefecture

- Coordinates: 37°40′23.1″N 138°52′56″E
- Country: Japan
- Region: Chūbu (Kōshin'etsu) (Hokuriku)
- Prefecture: Niigata

Government
  - Mayor: Tsutomu Suzuki (since April 2010)

Area
  - Total: 110.96 km^{2} (42.84 sq mi)

Population (July 1, 2019)
  - Total: 77,382
  - Density: 697.39/km^{2} (1,806.2/sq mi)
- Time zone: UTC+9 (Japan Standard Time)
- Symbols
  - Tree: Sakura
  - Flower: Salvia, Chrysanthemum, Verbena
- Phone number: 0256-92-1111
- Address: 1-1 Yoshida-Hinode-cho, Tsubame-shi, Niigata-ken 959-0295
- Website: Official website

Tsubame (燕市, Tsubame-shi) is a city located in Niigata Prefecture, Japan. As of 1 July 2019, the city had an estimated population of 77,382 in 29,406 households, and a population density of 697 persons per km². The total area of the city was 110.96 km^{2} (42.84 sq mi).

== Geography ==
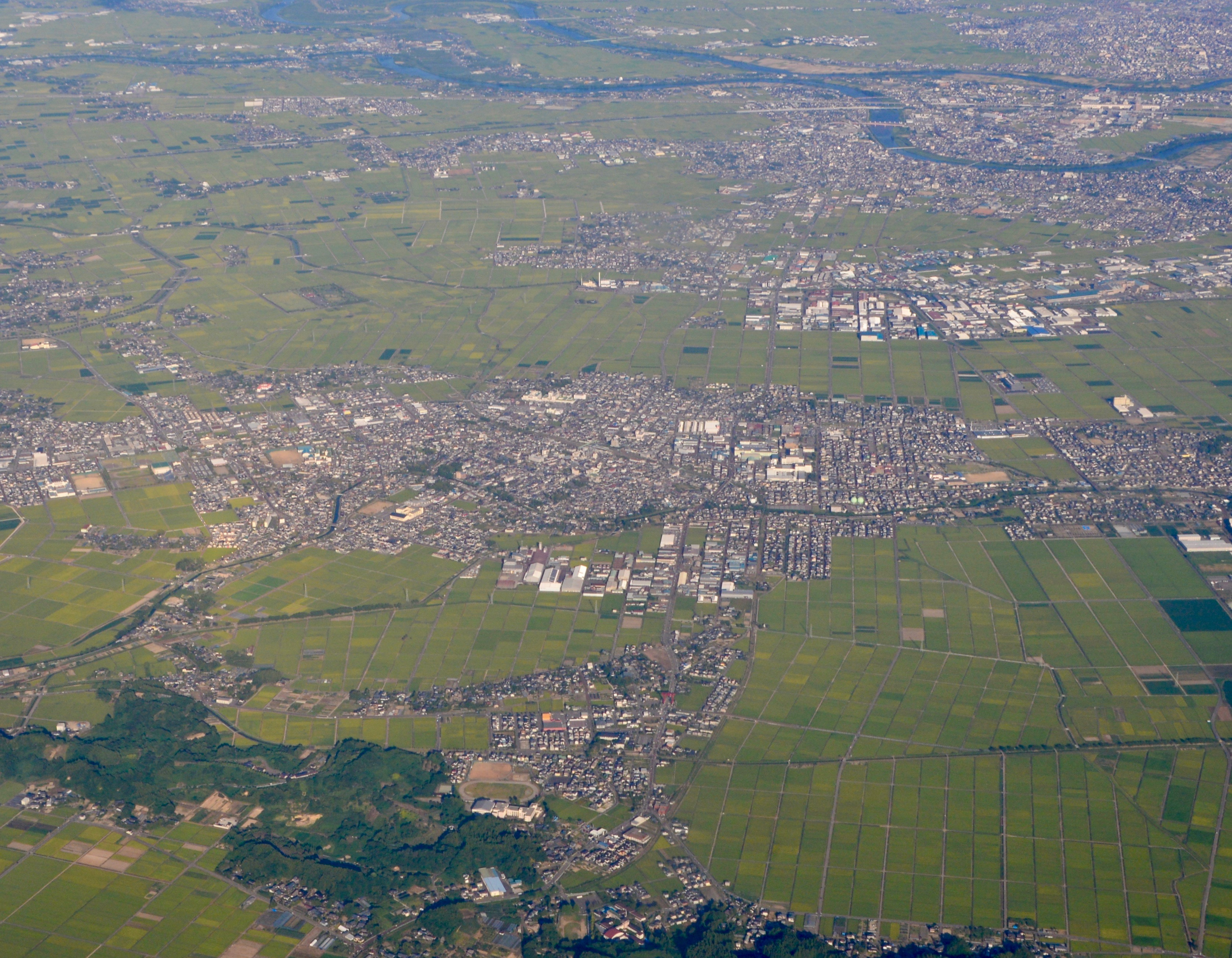
Aerial photograph of Tsubame City

Tsubame is located in the coastal plains of central Niigata Prefecture, but does not have a coastline on the Sea of Japan. The Shinano River flows through the city.

=== Surrounding municipalities ===
- Niigata Prefecture
  - Niigata
  - Nagaoka
  - Sanjō
  - Yahiko

== Climate ==
Tsubame has a humid subtropical climate (Köppen Cfa) characterized by warm, wet summers and cold winters with heavy snowfall. The average annual temperature in Tsubame is 12.9 °C. The average annual rainfall is 2093 mm with September as the wettest month. The temperatures are highest on average in August, at around 26.12 °C, and lowest in January, at around 1.2 °C.

== Demographics ==
Per Japanese census data, the population of Tsubame has remained relatively unchanged over the past 50 years.

Historical population
Year	Pop.	±%
1970	78,444	—
1980	82,984	+5.8%
1990	83,377	+0.5%
2000	84,297	+1.1%
2010	81,876	−2.9%
2020	77,201	−5.7%

== History ==
The area of present-day Tsubame was part of ancient Echigo Province and has been settled since prehistoric times. Under the Edo period Tokugawa shogunate, the town of Tsubame was part of the holdings of Murakami Domain and developed as a river port on the Shinano River. During the early Meiji period, the area was organised into Nishikanbara District, Niigata. The town of Tsubame was established on April 1, 1889 with the creation of the modern municipalities system. It was raised to city status on March 31, 1954 by merging with the neighbouring villages of Koike, Konakagawa and Matsunaga. On March 20, 2006 Tsubame absorbed the towns of Bunsui and Yoshida (both from Nishikanbara District).

== Government ==
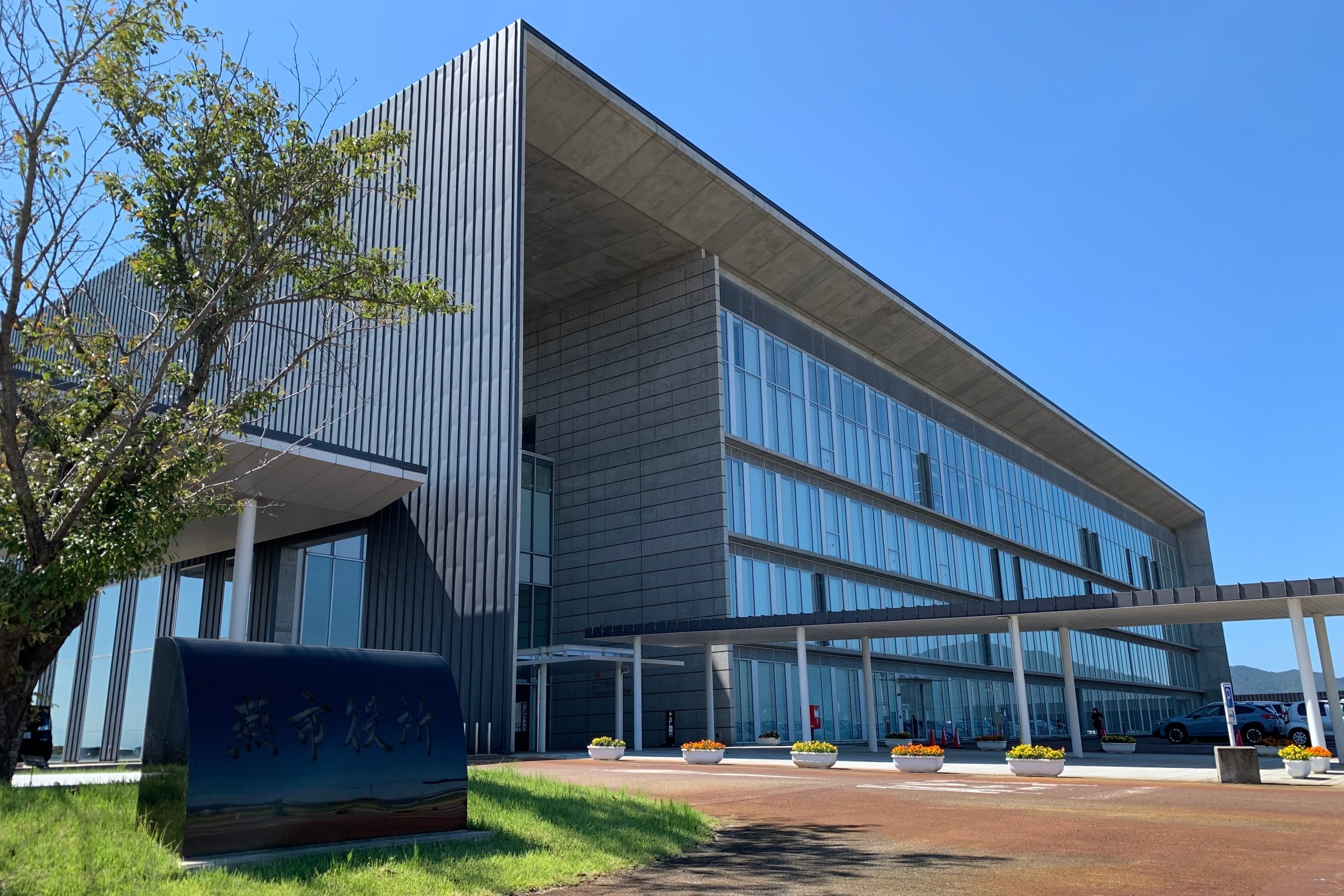
Tsubame City Hall

Tsubame has a mayor-council form of government with a directly elected mayor and a unicameral city legislature of 24 members.

== Economy ==
Tsubame was traditionally known for its copper ware and the production of kiseru (Japanese smoking pipes). In modern times, Tsubame is noted for its production of tableware and cutlery.

== Education ==
Tsubame has 15 public elementary schools and five public middle schools operated by the city government. There are three public high schools operated by the Niigata Prefectural Board of Education, and the prefecture also operates one special education school.

== Transportation ==
=== Railway ===
JR East - Echigo Line

- Bunsui - Aōzu - Minami-Yoshida - Yoshida - Kita-Yoshida

JR East - Yahiko Line

- (Yahagi) - Yoshida - Nishi-Tsubame - Tsubame - (Tsubame-Sanjō)

Note: Although the nearest stop on the Jōetsu Shinkansen is called Tsubame-Sanjō Station, the station is physically located in the city of Sanjō and not in Tsubame.

=== Highway ===
- Hokuriku Expressway - Hokuriku Expressway
- National Route 116
- National Route 289

== Local attractions ==
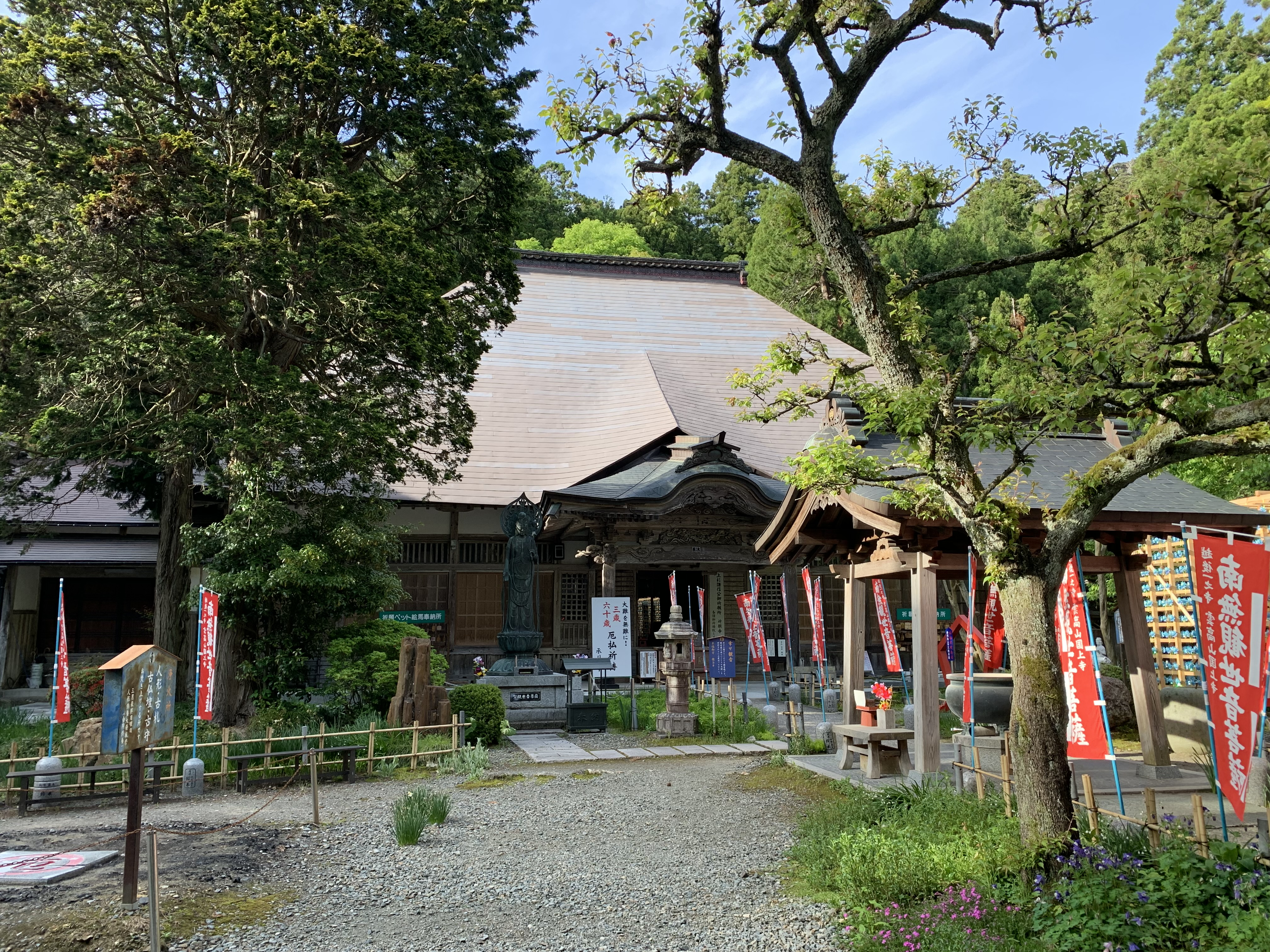
Kokujo Temple

- Mount Kugami / Kokujo Temple

== Sister cities ==
- Dundee, Michigan, United States. Dundee and Tsubame have an exchange program through their local middle schools
- Sheboygan, Wisconsin, United States, since January 11, 1996

== Notable People from Tsubame ==
- Killer Khan (professional wrestler)
- Kiriko Nananan (manga artist)
- Chinami Nishimura (politician)
