= Kita-Nagaoka Station =

Railway station in Nagaoka, Niigata Prefecture, Japan

Kita-Nagaoka Station 北長岡駅
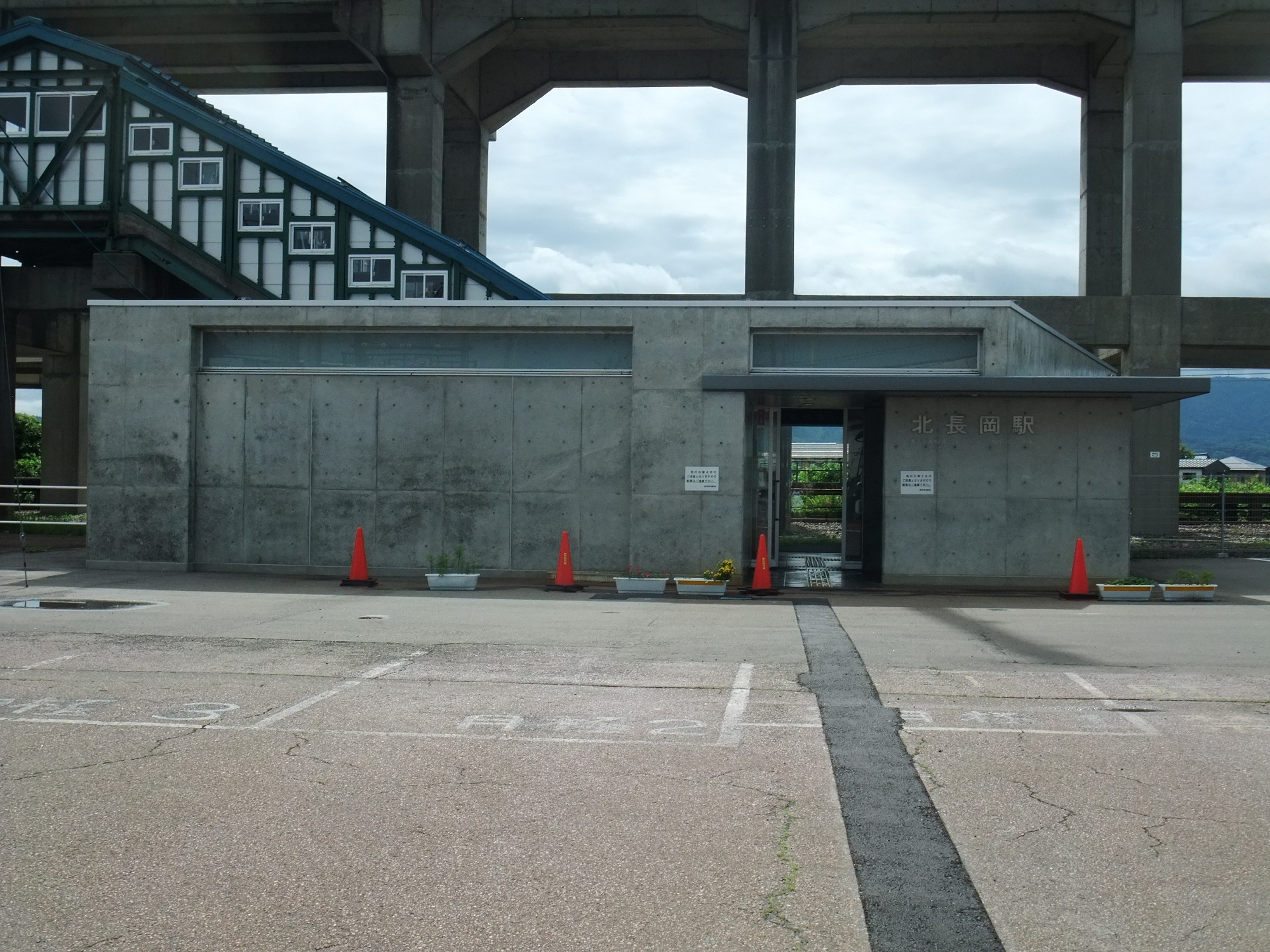
- Kita-Nagaoka Station in July 2016

General information
- Location: 2 Jōoka, Nagaoka-shi, Niigata-ken; Japan
- Coordinates: 37.4685°N 138.8625°E
- Operator: JR East
- Line: ■ Shinetsu Main Line
- Distance: 75.5 km from Naoetsu
- Platforms: 1 island platform
- Tracks: 2

Other information
- Status: Unstaffed
- Website: Official website

History
- Opened: 1 November 1915; 110 years ago
- Rebuilt: 2014; 12 years ago
- Former names: Jōoka Station (until 1951)

Services
Preceding station	JR East	Following station
Nagaoka towards Naoetsu	Shin'etsu Main Line Local	Oshikiri towards Niigata
Location
- Location within JR Shinetsu Main Line Location within Japan

Kita-Nagaoka Station (北長岡駅, Kita-Nagaoka-eki) is a railway station on the Shinetsu Main Line in the city of Nagaoka, Niigata, Japan, operated by East Japan Railway Company (JR East).

== Lines ==
Kita-Nagaoka Station is served by the Shinetsu Main Line and is 75.5 kilometers from the starting point of the line at Naoetsu Station.

== Station layout ==
The station consists of one ground-level island platform connected to the station building by a footbridge, serving two tracks, located adjacent to the elevated Joetsu Shinkansen tracks. The station is unattended.

=== Platforms ===
1	■ Shin'etsu Main Line	for Niigata
2	■ Shin'etsu Main Line	for Nagaoka

== History ==
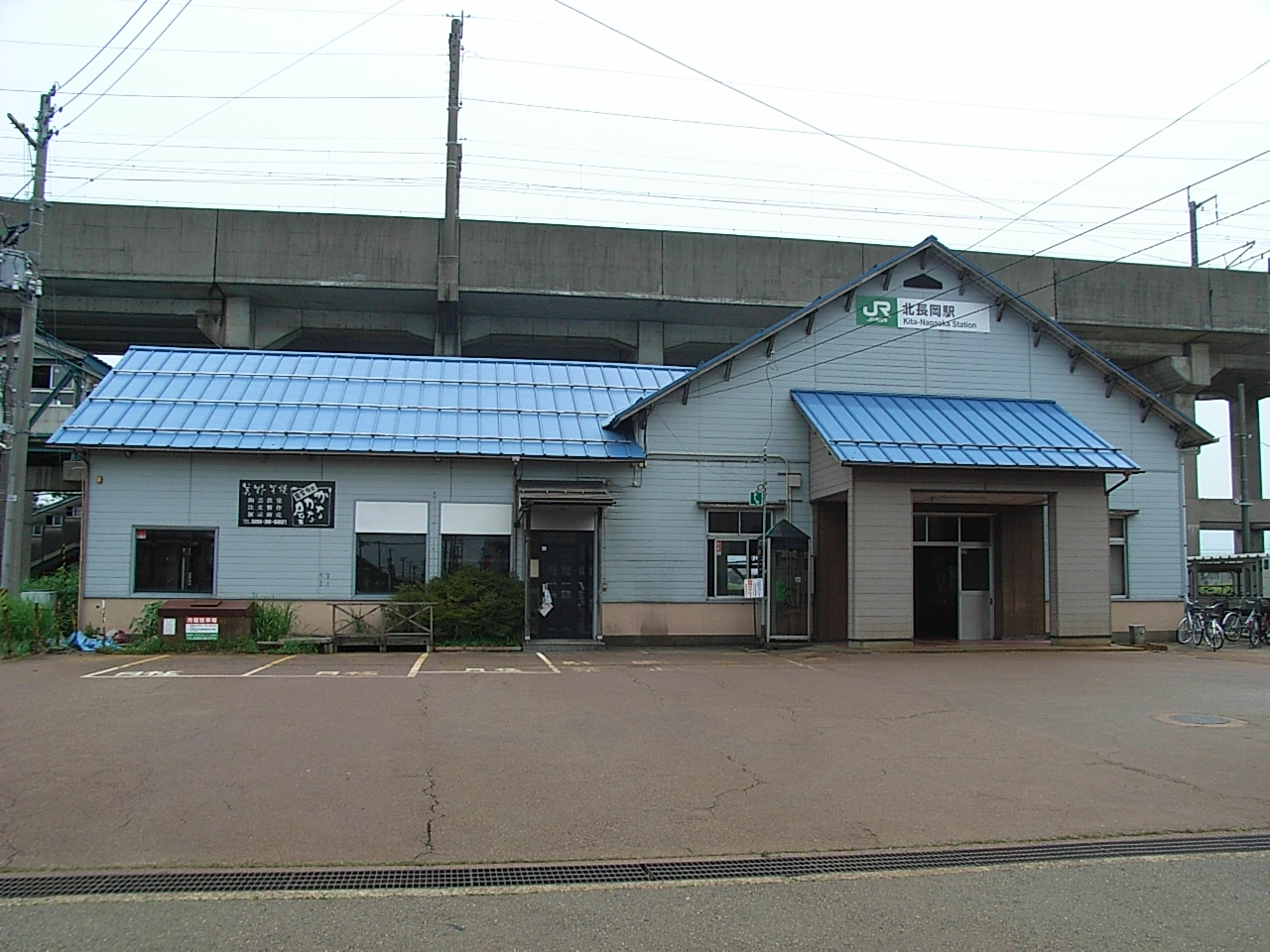
The station in June 2009, before rebuilding

The station opened on 1 November 1915 as Jōoka Station (城岡駅). It was renamed Kita-Nagaoka on 20 June 1951. With the privatization of Japanese National Railways (JNR) on 1 April 1987, the station came under the control of JR East. A new station building was completed in July 2014.

== Surrounding area ==
- National Route 352

== See also ==
- List of railway stations in Japan
