= Sanjō, Niigata =

Sanjō 三条市
- City
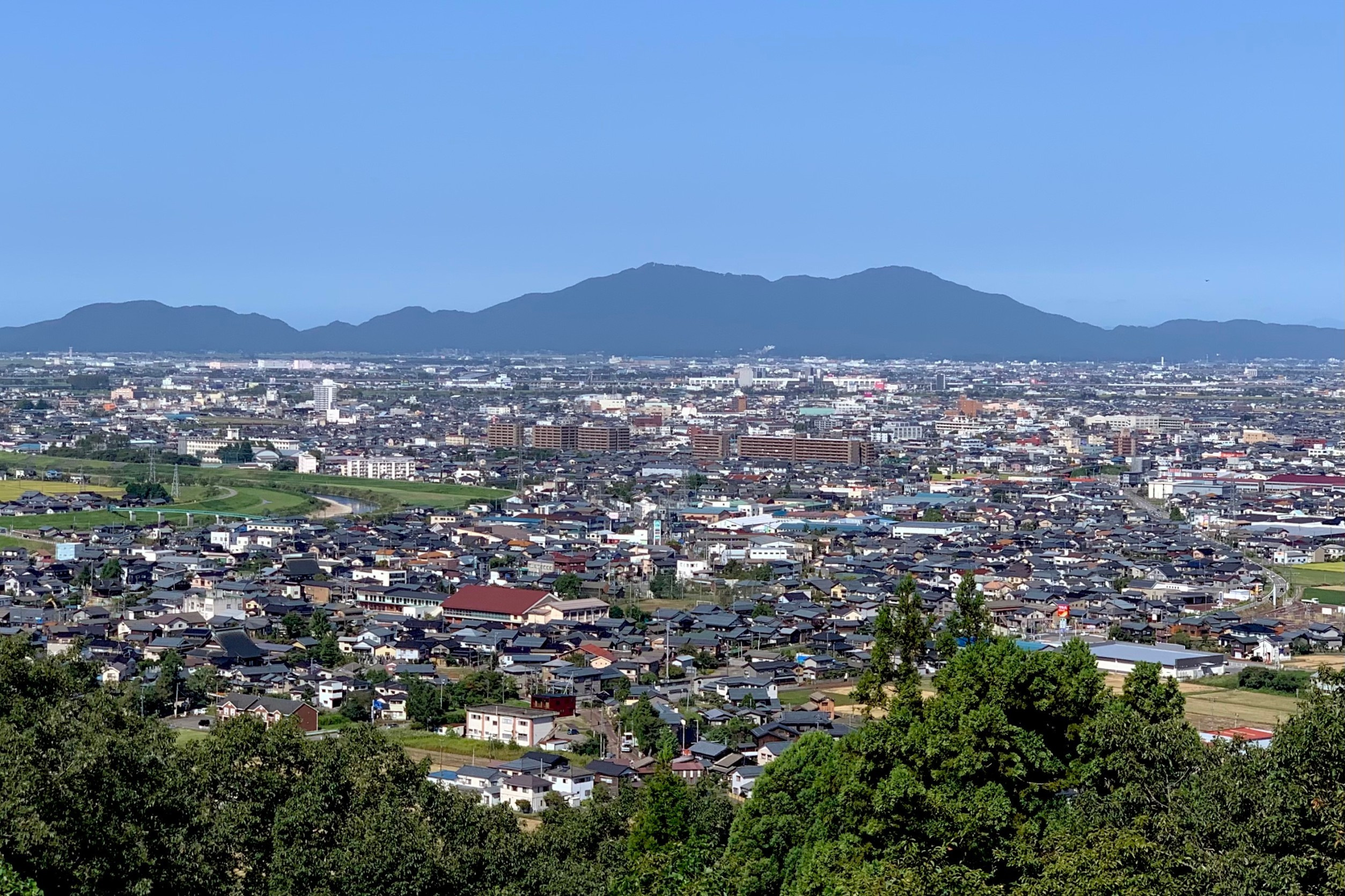
- View from Osakiyama Park Terrace

- Flag Seal

- Location of Sanjō in Niigata

- Coordinates: 37°38′12.4″N 138°57′42″E
- Country: Japan
- Region: Chūbu (Kōshin'etsu) (Hokuriku)
- Prefecture: Niigata

Government
  - Mayor: Ryo Takizawa (from November 2020)

Area
  - Total: 431.97 km^{2} (166.78 sq mi)

Population (July 1, 2019)
  - Total: 95,706
  - Density: 221.56/km^{2} (573.83/sq mi)
- Time zone: UTC+9 (Japan Standard Time)
- Phone number: 0256-34-5511
- Address: 2-3-1 Asahi-chō, Sanjō-shi, Niigata-ken 955-8686
- Climate: Cfa
- Website: Official website
- Symbols
- Bird: Chicken (Shiba jidori)
- Flower: Liliaceae, Iris ensata, Sunflower
- Tree: Japanese White Pine, Taxus cuspidata

Sanjō (三条市, Sanjō-shi) is a city located in Niigata Prefecture, Japan. As of 1 July 2019, the city had an estimated population of 95,706 in 36,201 households, and a population density of 222 persons per km^{2}. The total area of the city was 431.97 square kilometres (166.78 sq mi).

== Geography ==
Sanjō is located in an inland region of north-central Niigata Prefecture. It is about 2 hours from Tokyo via the Jōetsu Shinkansen or 4 hours on the Kan-Etsu Expressway and Hokuriku Expressway. The Shinano River flows through the west of it from south to north and the Ikarashi-gawa River flows through the centre of the urbanised area.

=== Surrounding municipalities ===
- Fukushima Prefecture
  - Tadami
- Niigata Prefecture
  - Aga
  - Gosen
  - Kamo
  - Mitsuke
  - Nagaoka
  - Niigata
  - Tsubame
  - Uonuma

=== Climate ===
Sanjō has a humid subtropical climate (Köppen Cfa) characterized by warm, wet summers and cold winters with heavy snowfall. The average annual temperature in Sanjō is 13.6 °C (56.5 °F). The average annual rainfall is 2,056.3 mm (80.96 in) with September as the wettest month. The temperatures are highest on average in August, at around 26.2 °C (79.2 °F), and lowest in January, at around 2.0 °C (35.6 °F).

Climate data for Sanjō, elevation 9 m (30 ft), (1991−2020 normals, extremes 1978−present)
Month	Jan	Feb	Mar	Apr	May	Jun	Jul	Aug	Sep	Oct	Nov	Dec	Year
Record high °C (°F)	14.3 (57.7)	21.7 (71.1)	26.5 (79.7)	32.5 (90.5)	33.7 (92.7)	36.1 (97.0)	39.5 (103.1)	40.4 (104.7)	40.4 (104.7)	36.0 (96.8)	28.3 (82.9)	19.1 (66.4)	40.4 (104.7)
Mean daily maximum °C (°F)	4.9 (40.8)	5.6 (42.1)	10.0 (50.0)	16.6 (61.9)	22.2 (72.0)	25.5 (77.9)	29.1 (84.4)	30.8 (87.4)	27.0 (80.6)	20.8 (69.4)	14.2 (57.6)	8.0 (46.4)	17.9 (64.2)
Daily mean °C (°F)	2.0 (35.6)	2.2 (36.0)	5.5 (41.9)	11.2 (52.2)	17.0 (62.6)	21.0 (69.8)	24.9 (76.8)	26.2 (79.2)	22.3 (72.1)	16.1 (61.0)	9.9 (49.8)	4.6 (40.3)	13.6 (56.4)
Mean daily minimum °C (°F)	−0.5 (31.1)	−0.8 (30.6)	1.5 (34.7)	6.3 (43.3)	12.4 (54.3)	17.3 (63.1)	21.5 (70.7)	22.5 (72.5)	18.4 (65.1)	12.0 (53.6)	6.1 (43.0)	1.7 (35.1)	9.9 (49.8)
Record low °C (°F)	−12.5 (9.5)	−10.3 (13.5)	−5.6 (21.9)	−2.2 (28.0)	3.8 (38.8)	8.6 (47.5)	13.9 (57.0)	12.4 (54.3)	7.8 (46.0)	2.8 (37.0)	−2.2 (28.0)	−10.4 (13.3)	−12.5 (9.5)
Average precipitation mm (inches)	219.6 (8.65)	137.0 (5.39)	123.6 (4.87)	98.0 (3.86)	94.2 (3.71)	132.5 (5.22)	243.2 (9.57)	171.6 (6.76)	144.6 (5.69)	160.4 (6.31)	236.7 (9.32)	287.8 (11.33)	2,056.3 (80.96)
Average precipitation days (≥ 1.0 mm)	8.4	4.9	4.4	3.4	3.3	3.9	6.5	5.2	5.0	5.6	8.7	10.7	70
Mean monthly sunshine hours	41.1	66.5	123.4	167.9	196.4	160.6	148.4	195.7	143.7	136.0	88.0	50.1	1,517.8
Source: Japan Meteorological Agency

== Demographics ==
Per Japanese census data, the population of Sanjō peaked at around 1985 and has declined steadily since.

Historical population
Year	Pop.	±%
1970	102,220	—
1980	109,429	+7.1%
1990	110,228	+0.7%
2000	107,662	−2.3%
2010	102,292	−5.0%
2020	94,642	−7.5%

== History ==
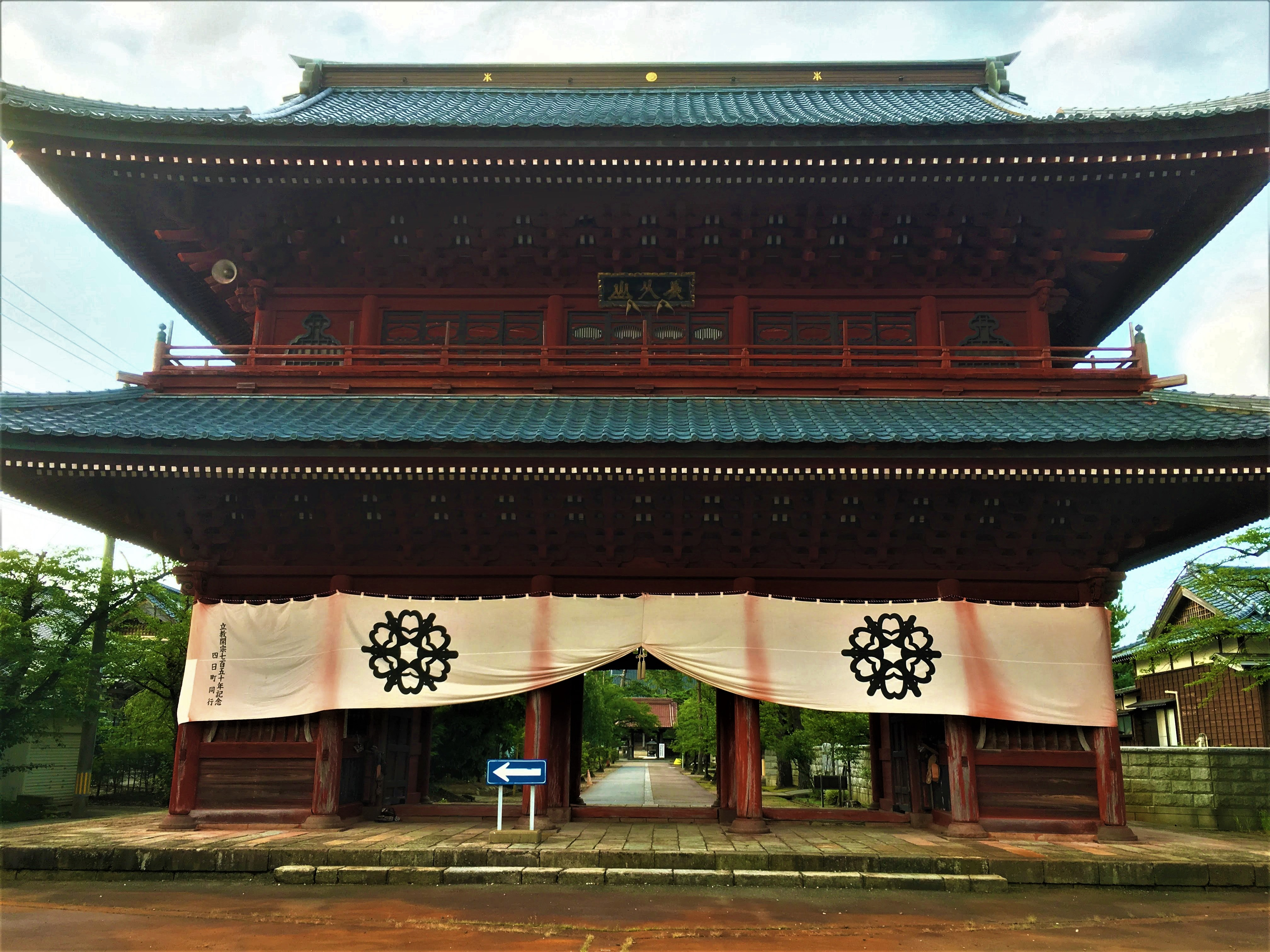
Honjoji temple

The area of present-day Sanjō was part of ancient Echigo Province. During the Edo period, the area was part of Sanjō Domain, a feudal domain under the Tokugawa shogunate from 1598 to 1651. Afterwards, it was divided between Nagaoka Domain, Murakami Domain and tenryō territory administered directly by the shogunate. After the start of the Meiji period, the area was organised as part of Minamikanbara District, Niigata. The town of Sanjō was created with the establishment of the modern municipalities system on April 1, 1889. It was raised to city status on January 1, 1934. Heavy rain caused extensive flooding in 1961 and in 2004. On May 1, 2005, the town of Sakae, and the village of Shitada (both from Minamikanbara District) were merged into Sanjō.

== Government ==
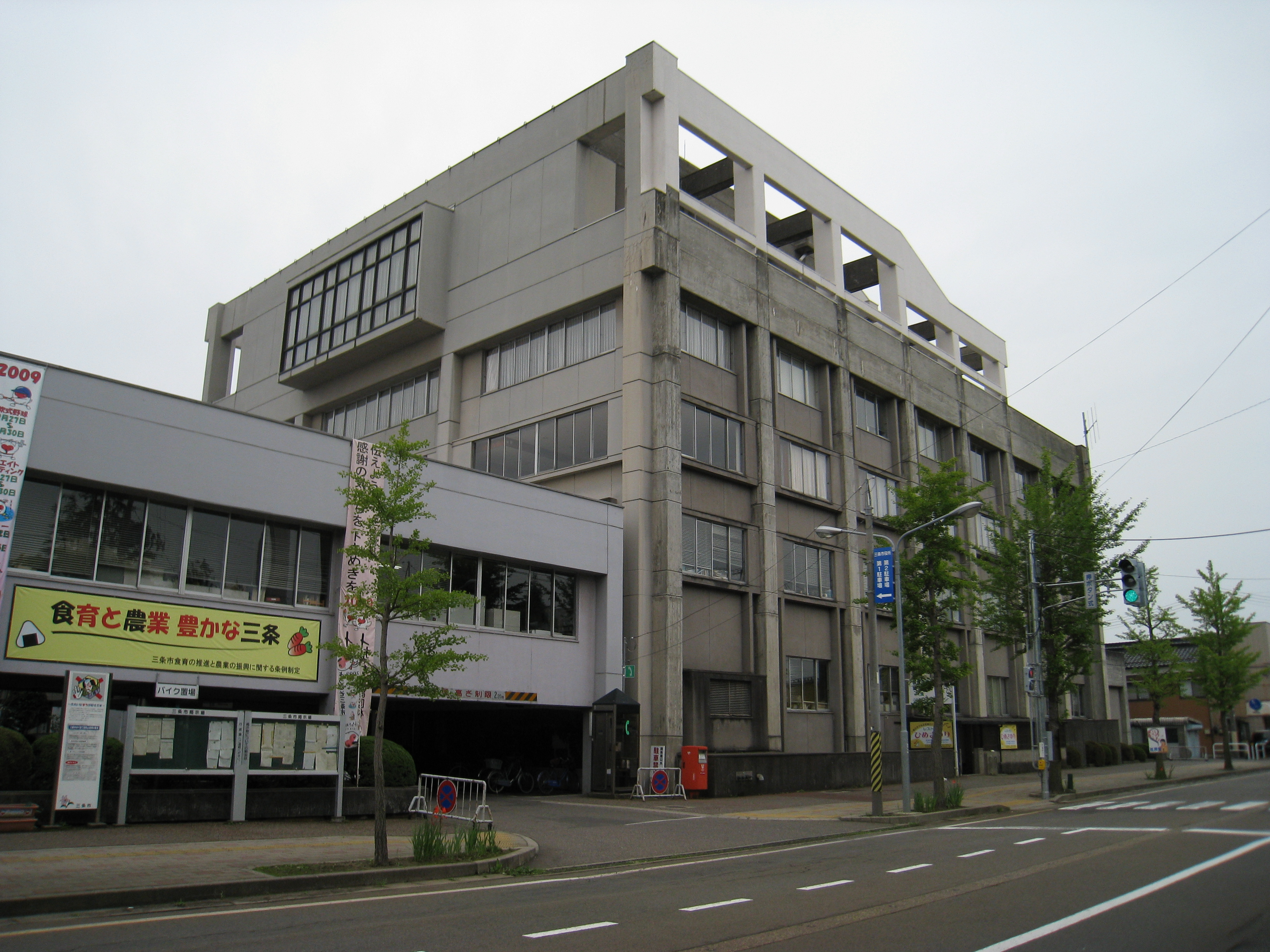
Sanjō City Hall

Sanjō has a mayor-council form of government with a directly elected mayor and a unicameral city legislature of 22 members. On November 8, 2020, attorney Ryo Takizawa was elected to become the next mayor of Sanjō.

== Economy ==
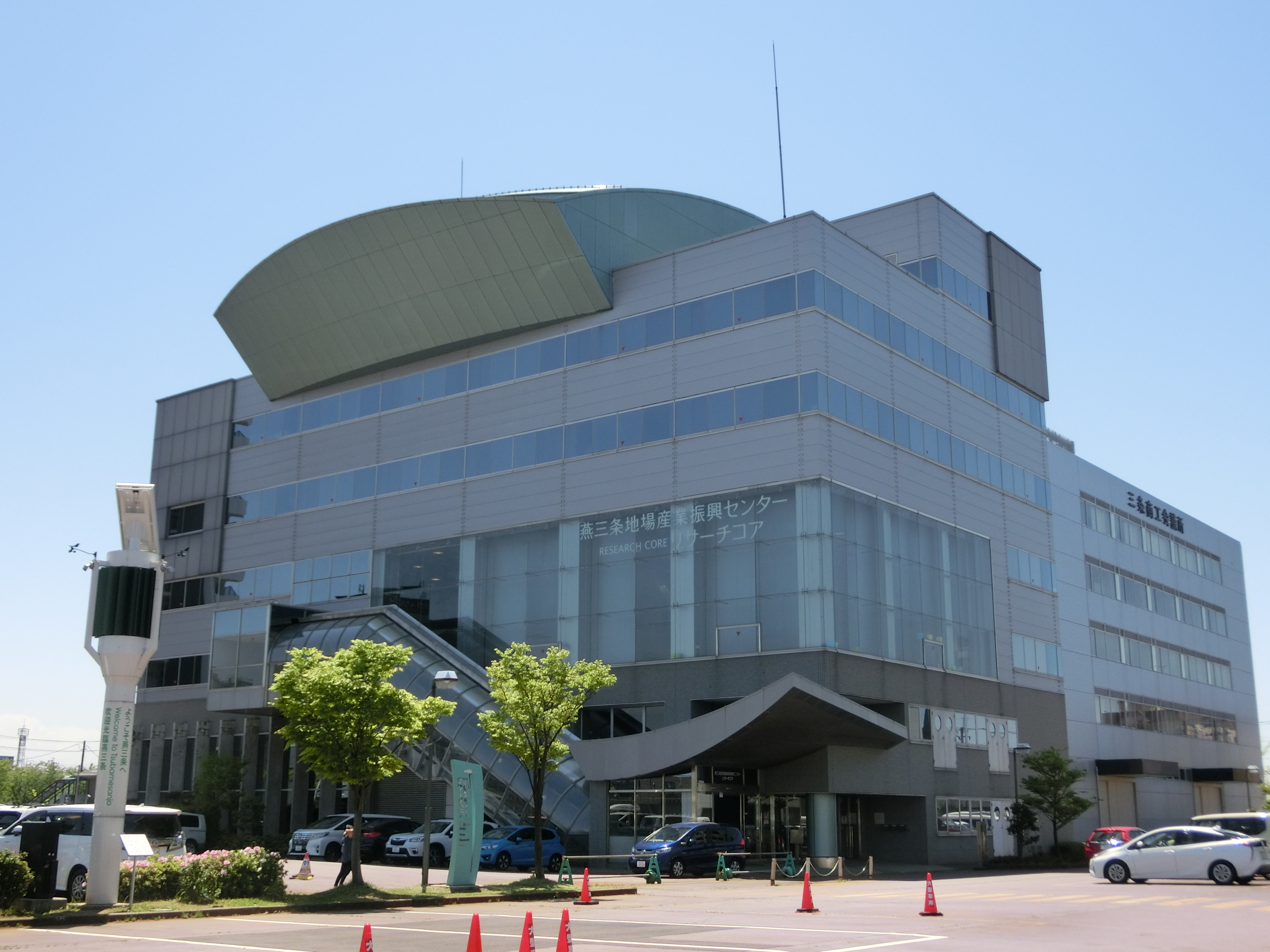
Tsubamesanjo Regional Industries Promotion Center Research Core

Sanjō is traditionally known for its iron crafts, notably knives and scissors. The following are headquartered in Sanjō.

- Asano (manufacturer of commercial fishing equipment)
- Marunao (manufacturer of chopsticks)
- Snow Peak (manufacturer of high-end camping equipment)
- Suwada (manufacturer of nail care instruments)

It is also one of the municipalities where a local Factory Festival takes place once per year in October (Kouba no Saiten).

== Education ==
Sanjō has 25 public elementary schools and nine public middle schools operated by the city government. There are four public high schools operated by the Niigata Prefectural Board of Education, and the prefecture also operates one special education school.

== Transportation ==
=== Railway ===
JR East - Jōetsu Shinkansen

- Tsubame-Sanjō

JR East - Shin'etsu Main Line

- Obiori - Tōkōji - Sanjō - Higashi-Sanjō - Honai

JR East - Yahiko Line

- Tsubame-Sanjō - Kita-Sanjō - Higashi-Sanjō

=== Highway ===
- Hokuriku Expressway – Sanjō IC
- National Route 8
- National Route 289
- National Route 290
- National Route 403

== Sister cities ==
- Vaughan, Ontario, Canada, since October 18, 1993
- Ezhou, China, since April 28, 1994

== Notable people from Sanjō ==
- Shohei Baba (baseball player, professional wrestler)
- Masayuki Kakefu (baseball player)
- Chihiro Kaneko (baseball player)
- Kumi Mizuno (motion picture actress)
- Tetsuji Morohashi (lexicographer)
