= Shitada, Niigata =

Shitada 下田村
- Former municipality
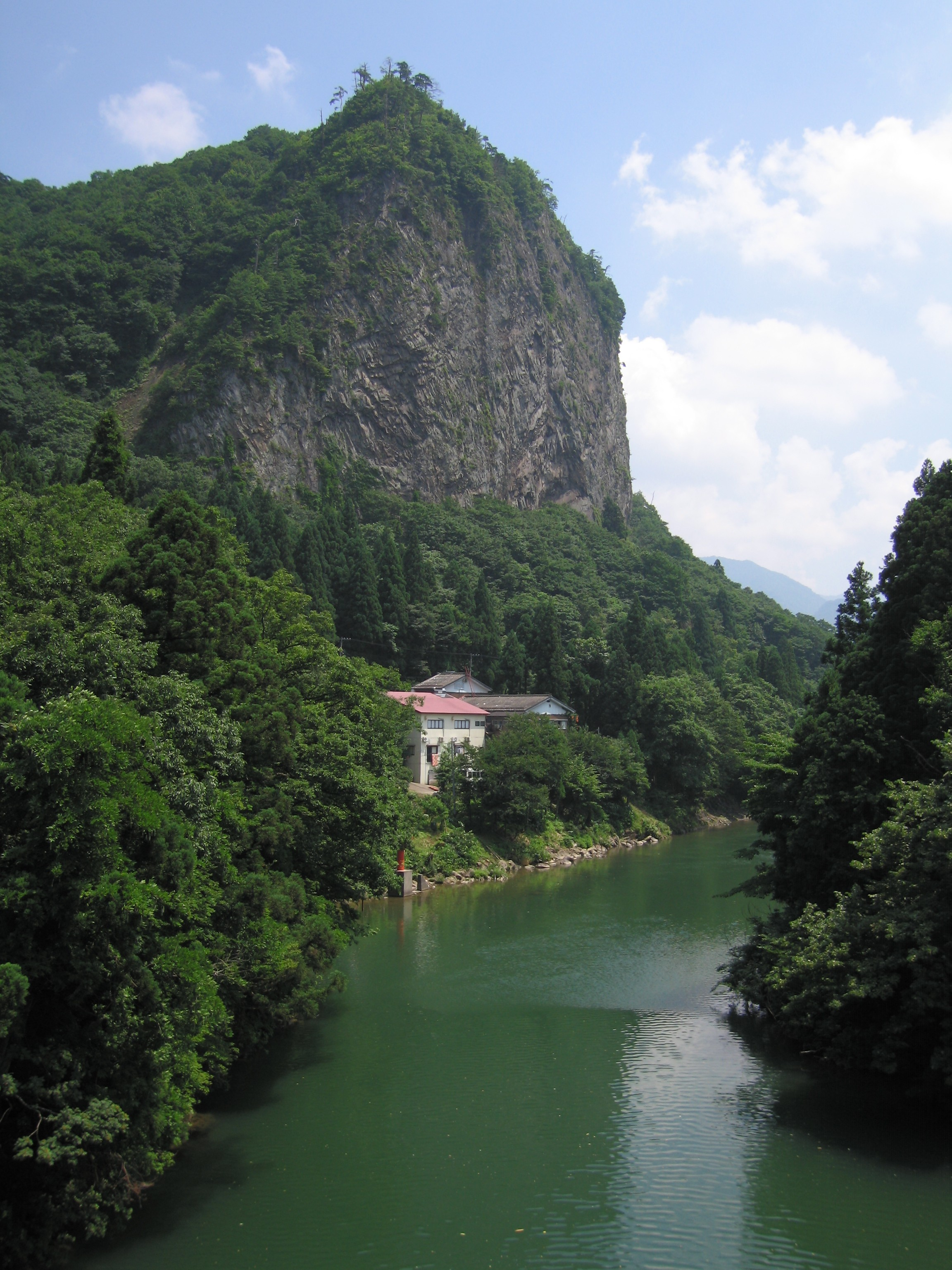
- Yagigahana

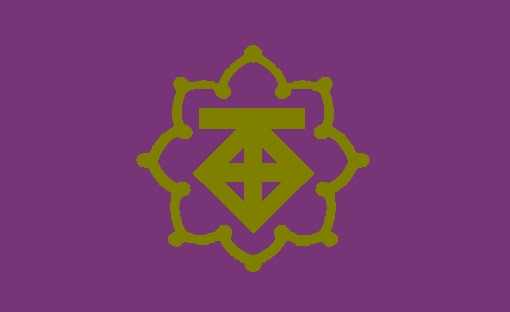
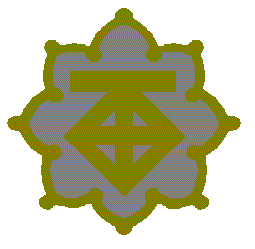
- Flag Seal
- Interactive map of Shitada
- Country: Japan
- Region: Hokuriku
- Prefecture: Niigata Prefecture
- District: Minamikanbara District
- Merged: May 1, 2005 (now part of Sanjō)

Area
  - Total: 311.00 km^{2} (120.08 sq mi)

Population (2003)
  - Total: 11,118
- Time zone: UTC+09:00 (JST)

3 former municipalities merged to create the new Sanjō City (orange area)

Shitada (下田村, Shitada-mura) was a village located in Minamikanbara District, Niigata Prefecture, Japan.

== Population ==
As of 2003, the village had an estimated population of 11,118 and a density of 35.75 persons per km^{2}. The total area was 311.00 km^{2}.

== History ==
On May 1, 2005, Shitada, along with the town of Sakae (also from Minamikanbara District), was merged into the expanded city of Sanjō.

== Transportation ==
=== Railway ===
JNR Yahiko Line had been operated in the village until 1984.

=== Highway ===
- National Route 289
- National Route 290

== Local attractions ==
- Yagigahana (ja:八木ヶ鼻)
- Echigo-Nagano Onsen (ja:越後長野温泉)
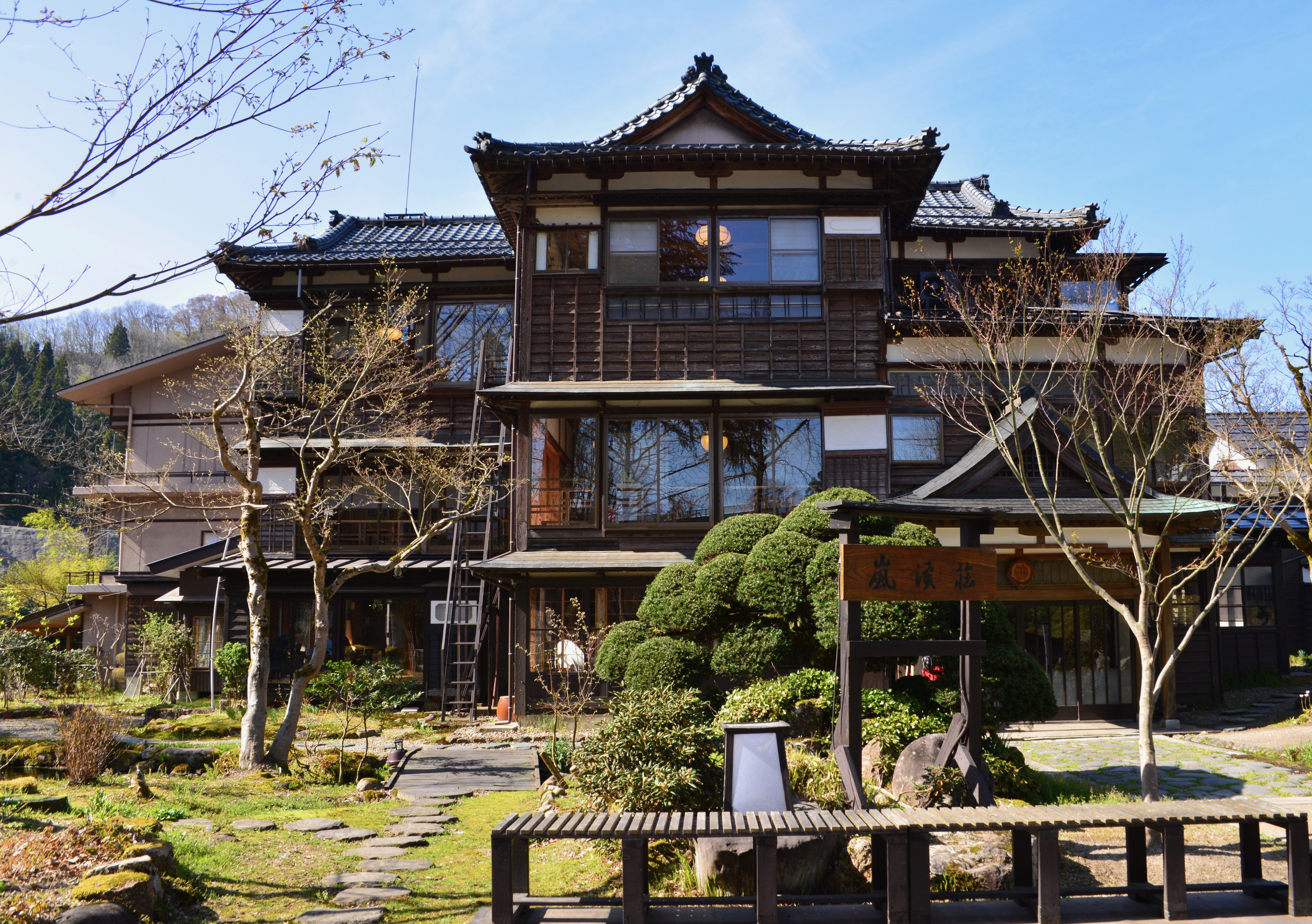
Echigo-Nagano Onsen Rankeiso
