= Kita-Yoshida Station =

Railway station in Tsubame, Niigata Prefecture, Japan

Kita-Yoshida Station 北吉田駅
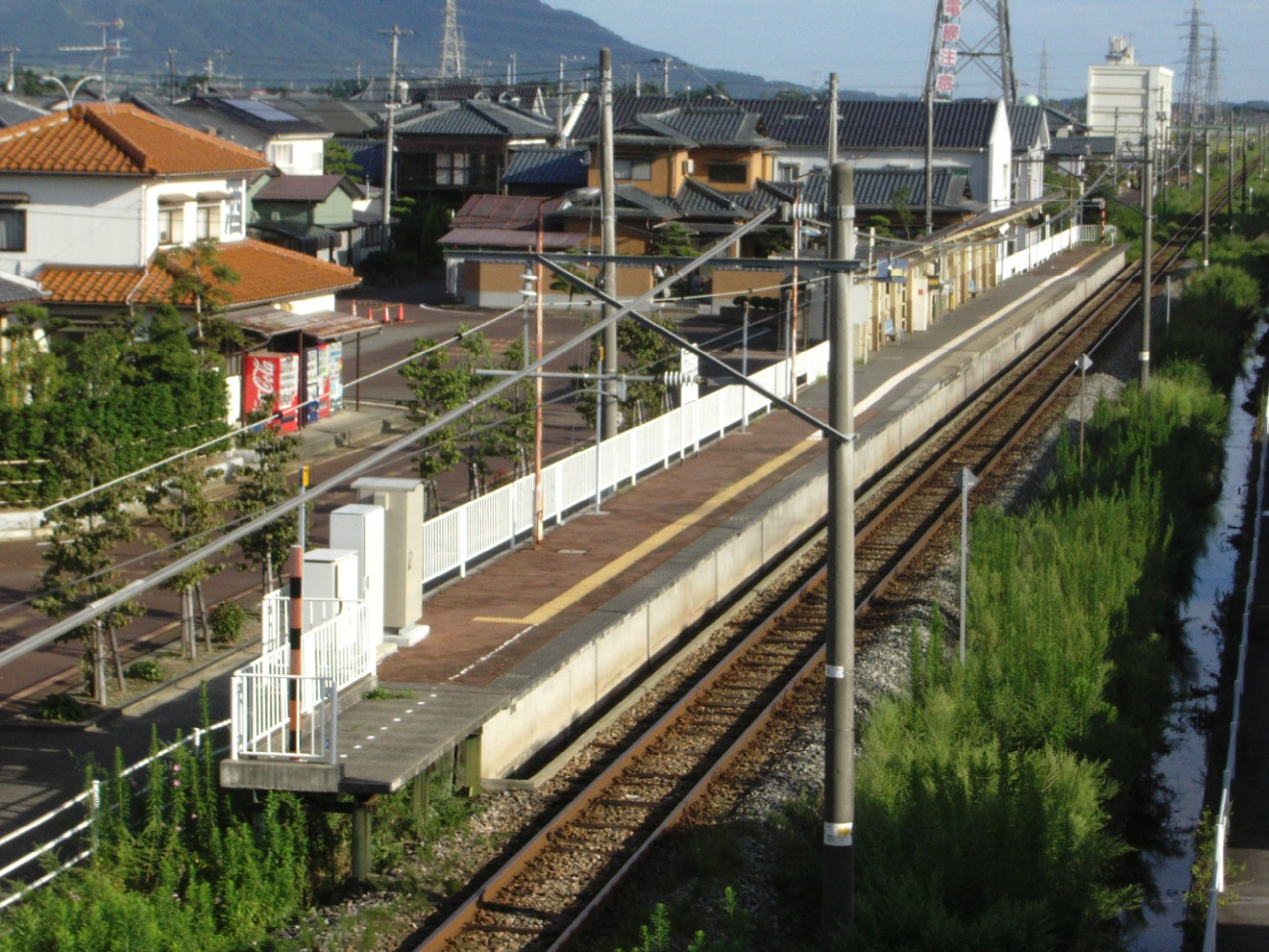
- Kita-Yoshida Station platform, September 2007

General information
- Location: Yoshida Bunkyo-machi, Tsubame-shi, Niigata-ken 959-0266; Japan
- Coordinates: 37°42′7.06″N 138°52′55.80″E
- Operator: JR East
- Line: ■ Echigo Line
- Distance: 51.7 km from Kashiwazaki
- Platforms: 1 side platform
- Tracks: 1

Other information
- Status: Unstaffed
- Website: Official website

History
- Opened: 8 April 1984

Services
Preceding station	JR East	Following station
Yoshida towards Kashiwazaki	Echigo Line	Iwamuro towards Niigata
Location
- Location within JR Echigo Line Location within Japan

Kita-Yoshida Station (北吉田駅, Kita-Yoshida-eki) is a railway station in the city of Tsubame, Niigata, Japan, operated by East Japan Railway Company (JR East).

== Lines ==
Kita-Yoshida Station is served by the Echigo Line, and is 51.7 kilometers from terminus of the line at Kashiwazaki.

== Station layout ==
The station consists of one ground-level side platform serving a single bi-directional track.

The station is unattended. Suica cards, Niigata City's travel scheme, can be used at this station. Rail tickets can be purchased from automatic ticket machines.

== History ==
The station opened on 8 April 1984 in Yoshida which is now part of the city of Tsubame. With the privatization of Japanese National Railways (JNR) on 1 April 1987, the station came under the control of JR East.

== Surrounding area ==
- National Route 116
- Yoshida High School
- Yoshida Middle School

== See also ==
- List of railway stations in Japan
