= Mimitori Site =

Archaeological site

Mimitori ruins
- 耳取遺跡 (Japanese)
- Mimitori ruins Mimitori Site (Japan)
- 37°30′27″N 138°55′12″E
- Type: settlement
- Periods: Jōmon period
- Location: Mitsuke, Niigata, Japan
- Region: Hokuriku region

Site notes
- Elevation: 76 m (249 ft)
- Public access: No facilities

The Mimitori ruins (耳取遺跡, Mimitori iseki) is an archaeological site containing the ruins of a Jōmon period settlement located in what is now part of the city of Mitsuke, Niigata in the Hokuriku region of Japan. The site was designated a National Historic Site of Japan in 2015.

== Overview ==
The Mimitori ruins are located in the Higashiyama Hills in the eastern portion of the Niigata Plain, on a ridge with an elevation of 76 meters. The size of this village ruin extends over 16,000 square meters, which makes it the largest in the Hokuriku region. The settlement existed from the middle Jōmon period (3000 to 2000 BC) through the late and final Jōmon period (2000 to 300 BC) and covered three overlapping areas. The middle Jōmon settlement was in the center of the hill, with houses in a horseshoe-shaped configuration around a central plaza, measuring 60 meters north-to-south by 70 meters east-to-west. The foundations of 12 oval-shaped pit dwellings measuring 8 x 3 meters were found, as was a large (10.6 centimeter) jadeite sphere.

The settlement expanded in the late Jōmon period to the west, forming a donut-shape, 200 meters north-to-south by 118 meters east-to-west with a central plaza 18 meters in diameter. A total of 66 pit dwelling foundations were found in this area. A midden was also discovered from this period. The final Jōmon period extended to the east of the original settlement. The style of buildings appears to have transitioned to elevated floor buildings. The pillar hole about 130 centimeters in diameter and was dug more than one meter deep, and a pillar about 50 centimeters in diameter was erected in it. Only two buildings were confirmed, but 36 similar holes were found in a wide area on the eastern side of the ruins. These are also considered to be pillar holes of the same building.

The site has been known since the end of the 19th century as a location where Jōmon pottery and stone tools could be found; however, it was not first excavated until 1967 after a spate of tomb robberies occurred in the area. As a result of these survey results, the momentum for protecting the ruins increased, and a development plan for a large-scale housing area in 1987 was canceled. From 2011 to 2014, and in 2016 the Mitsuke City Board of Education conducted excavations.

== See also ==
- List of Historic Sites of Japan (Niigata)
