= Sakae, Niigata =

Dissolved municipality in Niigata prefecture, Japan

Sakae (栄町, Sakae-machi) was a town located in Minamikanbara District, Niigata Prefecture, Japan.

== Population ==
As of 2003, the town had an estimated population of 11,656 and a density of 257.76 persons per km^{2}. The total area was 45.22 km^{2}.

== History ==
On May 1, 2005, Sakae, along with the village of Shitada (also from Minamikanbara District), was merged into the expanded city of Sanjō.
