= Kita-Sanjō Station =

Railway station in Sanjō, Niigata Prefecture, Japan

Kita-Sanjō Station 北三条駅
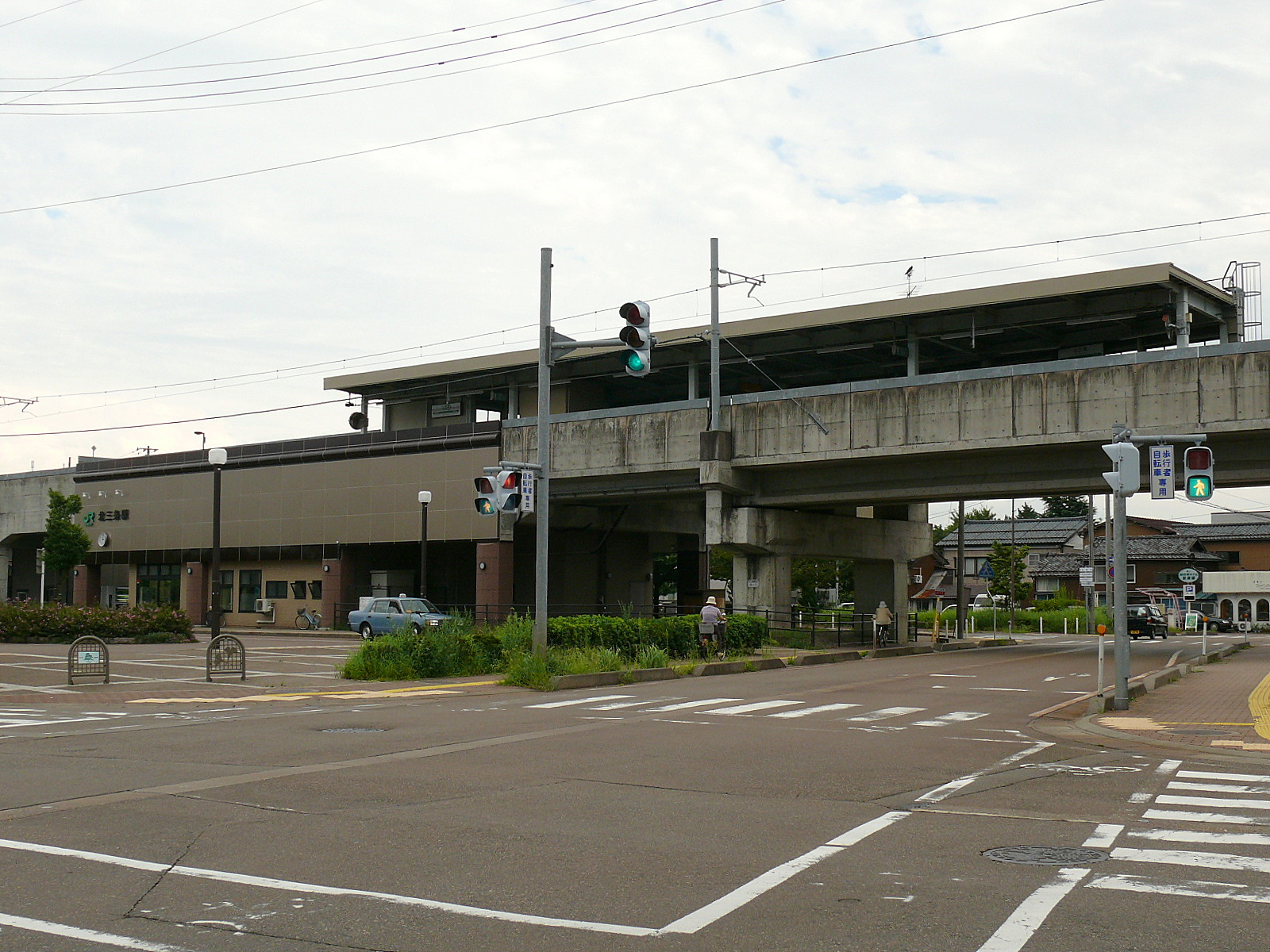
- Kita-Sanjō Station in 2008

General information
- Location: Motomachi, Sanjō-shi, Niigata-ken 955-0072; Japan
- Coordinates: 37°37′58″N 138°57′20″E
- Operator: JR East
- Line: ■ Yahiko Line
- Distance: 15.4 km from Yahiko
- Platforms: 1 side platform
- Tracks: 1

Other information
- Status: Staffed (Midori no Madoguchi )
- Website: Official website

History
- Opened: 10 April 1925; 101 years ago

Passengers
- FY2017: 393 daily

Services
Preceding station	JR East	Following station
Tsubame-Sanjō towards Yahiko	Yahiko Line	Higashi-Sanjō Terminus
Location
- Location within JR Yahiko Line Location within Japan

Kita-Sanjō Station (北三条駅, Kita-Sanjō-eki) is a railway station on the Yahiko Line in the city of Sanjō, Niigata, Japan, operated by East Japan Railway Company (JR East).

== Lines ==
Kita-Sanjō Station is served by the Yahiko Line and is 15.4 kilometers from the terminus of the line at Yahiko Station.

== Station layout ==
The station consists of one elevated side platform serving one bi-directional track. The station has a Midori no Madoguchi staffed ticket office.

== History ==
Kita-Sanjō Station opened on 10 April 1925. With the privatization of Japanese National Railways (JNR) on 1 April 1987, the station came under the control of JR East.

== Passenger statistics ==
In fiscal 2017, the station was used by an average of 393 passengers daily (boarding passengers only).

== Surrounding area ==
- Sanjō City Hall
- Sanjō Post Office

== See also ==
- List of railway stations in Japan
