= Kariyata River =

River in Niigata Prefecture, Japan

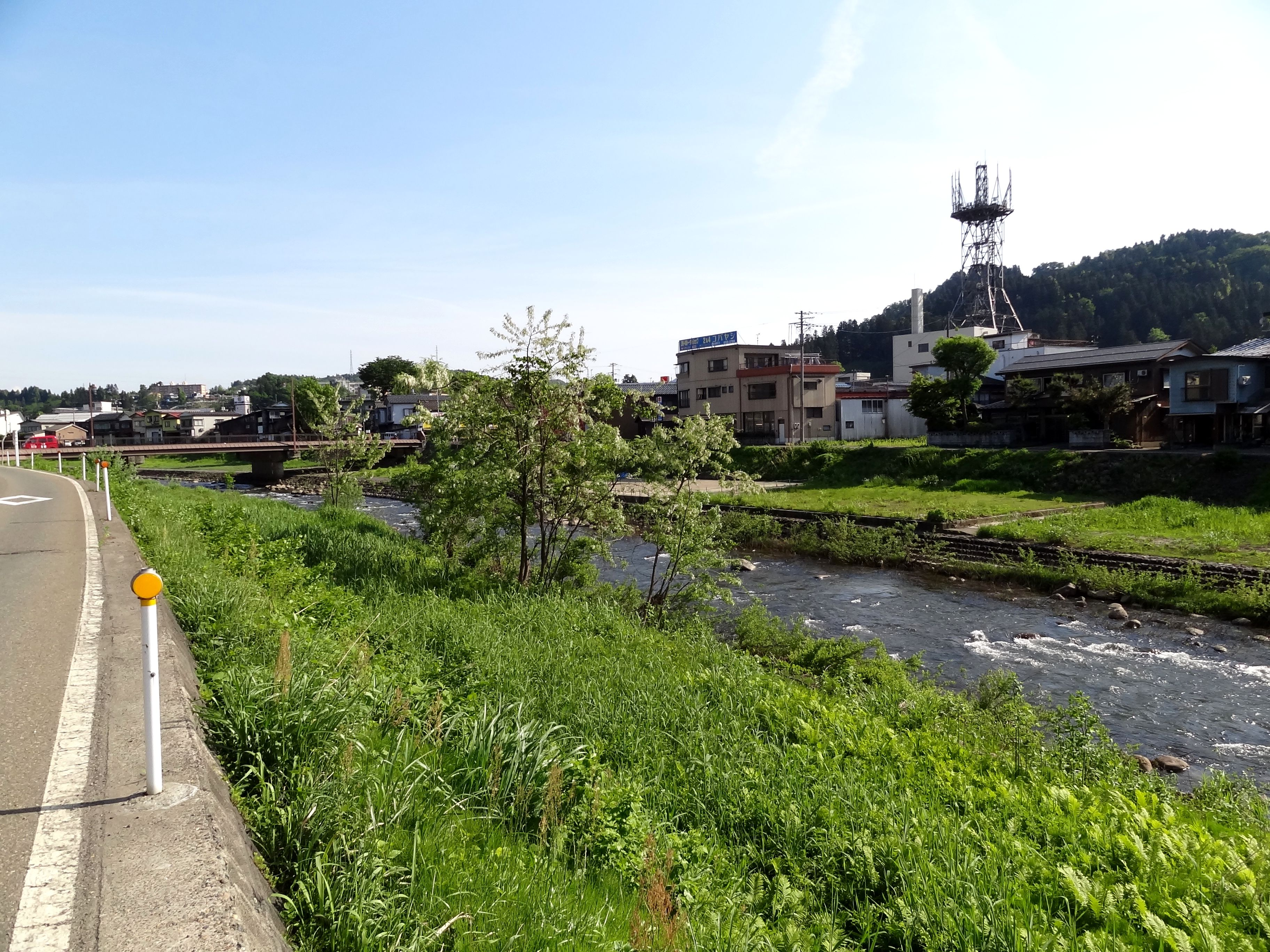

- Location within Japan
- Native name: 刈谷田川 (Japanese)

Location
- Country: Japan
- Prefectures: Niigata

Physical characteristics
- Source
  - coordinates: 37.4129°N 139.1202°E
- Mouth: Shinano River
  - coordinates: 37.6224°N 138.8917°E
- Length: 52.2 km (32.4 mi)
- Basin size: 240 km^{2} (93 sq mi)
- Discharge
  - location: Horinouchi

The Kariyata River (刈谷田川, Kariyata-gawa) is a river in Niigata Prefecture in Japan. It is a tributary of the Shinano River, which is the longest in Japan.

The river is 52,2 or 53,5 km long, its basin size is 239,8 km^{2}.

The river rises near the Sumon-Dake Mountain, on the border between Niigata and Fukushima prefectures.
