= Sanjō Station (Niigata) =

Railway station in Sanjō, Niigata Prefecture, Japan

Sanjō Station 三条駅
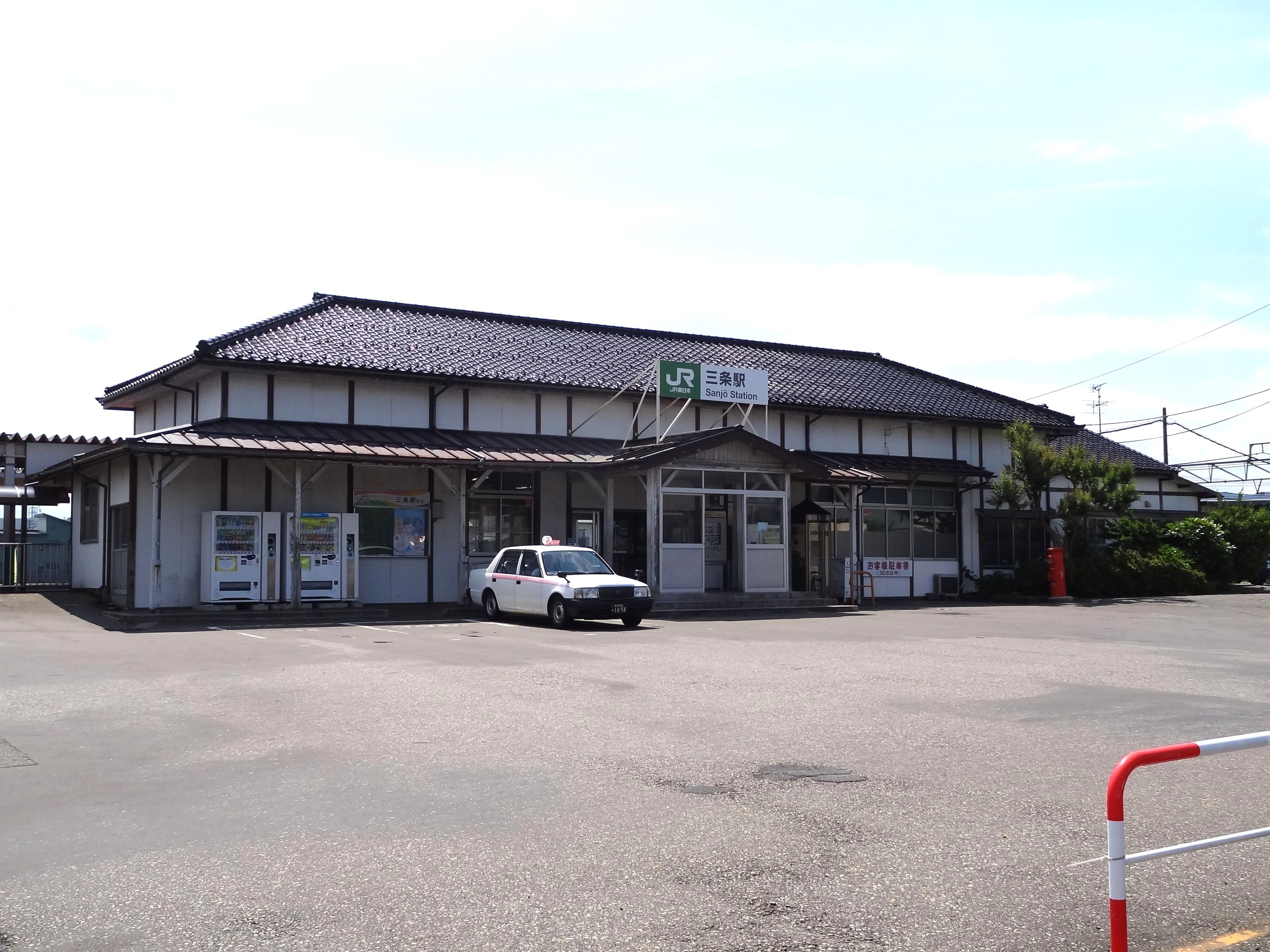
- Sanjō Station in July 2011

General information
- Location: Minami-shimbo, Sanjō-shi, Niigata-ken 955-0862; Japan
- Coordinates: 37°37′15″N 138°57′38″E
- Operator: JR East
- Line: ■ Shinetsu Main Line
- Distance: 94.6 from Naoetsu
- Platforms: 2 side platforms
- Tracks: 2

Other information
- Status: Staffed
- Website: Official website

History
- Opened: 16 June 1898; 128 years ago

Passengers
- FY2017: 1,820 (daily)

Services
| Preceding station | JR East | Following station |
|---|---|---|
| Mitsuke towards Naoetsu | Shin'etsu Main Line Rapid | Higashi-Sanjō towards Niigata |
| Tōkōji towards Naoetsu | Shin'etsu Main Line Local | Higashi-Sanjō towards Niigata |
Location
- Location within JR Shinetsu Main Line Location within Japan

Sanjō Station (三条駅, Sanjō-eki) is a railway station on the Shinetsu Main Line in the city of Sanjō, Niigata, Japan, operated by East Japan Railway Company (JR East).

== Lines ==
Sanjō Station is served by the Shinetsu Main Line, and is 94.6 kilometers from the terminus of the line at Naoetsu Station.

== Station layout ==
The station consists of two ground-level opposed side platforms connected by a footbridge, serving two tracks.

=== Platforms ===
| 1 | ■ Shinetsu Main Line | for Niigata |
| 3 | ■ Shinetsu Main Line | for Nagaoka |

== History ==
Sanjō Station opened on 16 June 1898. With the privatization of Japanese National Railways (JNR) on 1 April 1987, the station came under the control of JR East.

== Passenger statistics ==
In fiscal 2017, the station was used by an average of 1820 passengers daily (boarding passengers only).

== Surrounding area ==
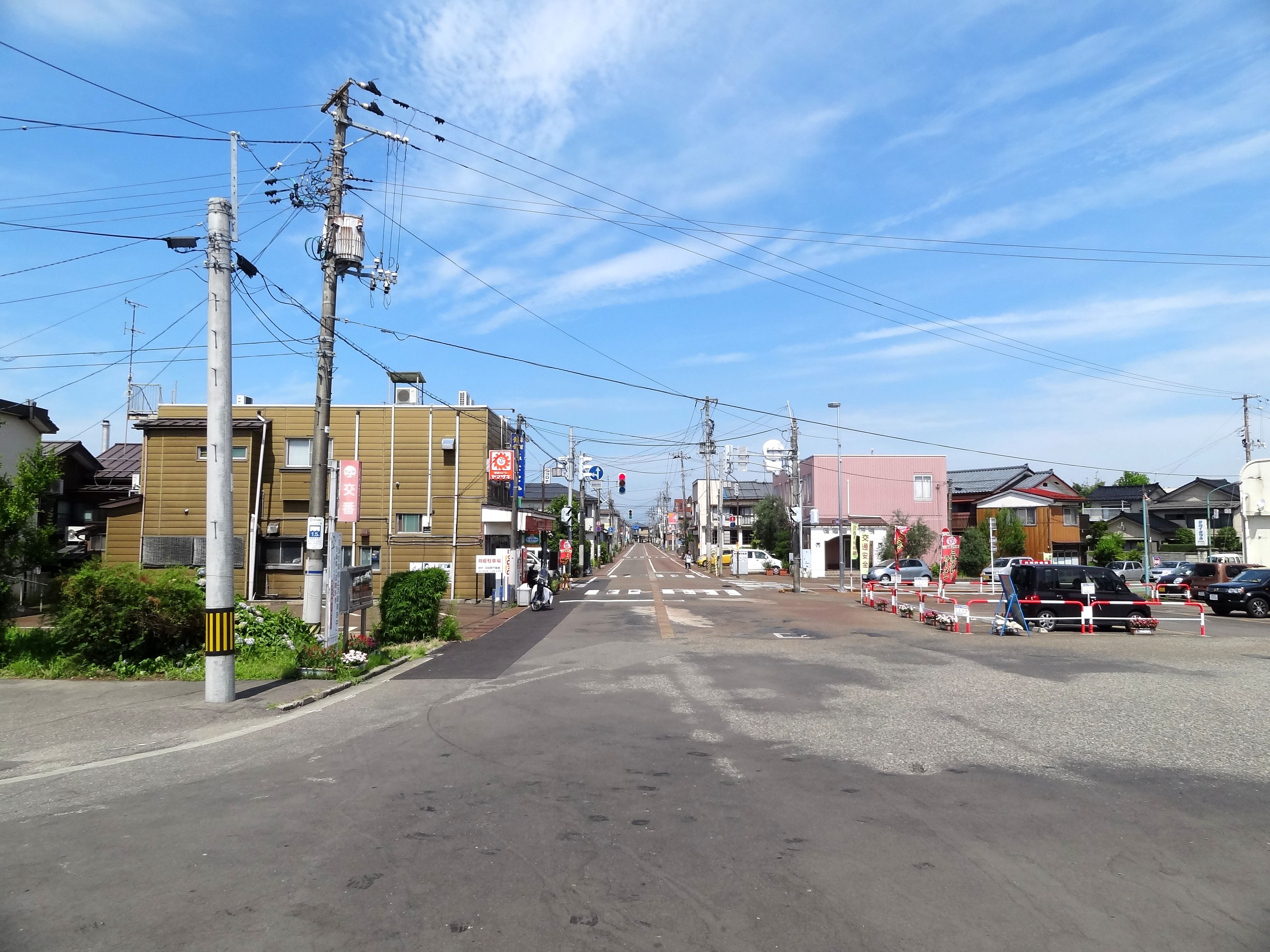
View from the station entrance

- Corona Corporation HQ
- Niigata Prefectural Sanjo High School

== See also ==
- List of railway stations in Japan
