= Mitsuke Station =

Railway station in Mitsuke, Niigata Prefecture, Japan

Mitsuke Station 見附駅
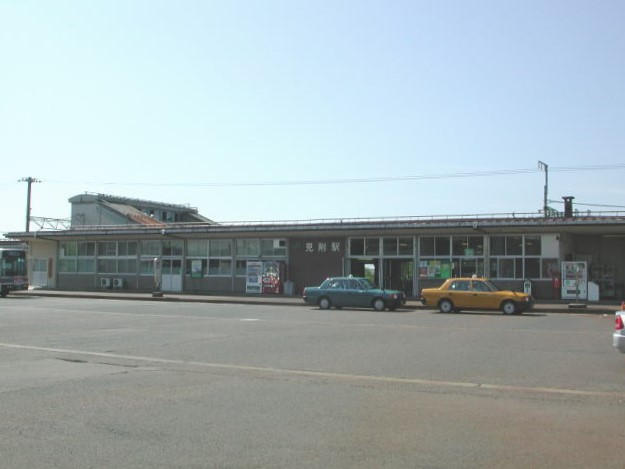
- Mitsuke Station in September 2004

General information
- Location: 2 Honjo, Mitsuke-shi, Niigata-ken 954-0051; Japan
- Coordinates: 37.5402°N 138.9050°E
- Operator: JR East
- Line: ■ Shinetsu Main Line
- Distance: 84.4 km from Naoetsu
- Platforms: 2 side platforms
- Tracks: 2

Other information
- Status: Staffed
- Website: Official website

History
- Opened: 16 June 1898; 128 years ago

Passengers
- 2,186 (FY2017)

Services
Preceding station	JR East	Following station
Nagaoka towards Naoetsu	Shirayuki	Higashi-Sanjō towards Niigata
Nagaoka towards Naoetsu	Shin'etsu Main Line Rapid	Sanjō towards Niigata
Oshikiri towards Naoetsu	Shin'etsu Main Line Local	Obiori towards Niigata
Location
- Location within JR Shinetsu Main Line Location within Japan

Mitsuke Station (見附駅, Mitsuke-eki) is a railway station on the Shinetsu Main Line in the city of Mitsuke, Niigata, Japan, operated by East Japan Railway Company (JR East).

== Lines ==
Mitsuke Station is served by the Shinetsu Main Line and is 84.4 kilometers from the terminus of the line at Naoetsu Station.

== Station layout ==
The station consists of two ground-level opposed side platforms connected by a footbridge, serving two tracks.

=== Platforms ===
1	■ Shinetsu Main Line	for Kashiwazaki and Naoetsu
2	■ Shinetsu Main Line	for Higashi-Sanjō and Niigata

== History ==
Mitsuke Station opened on 16 June 1898. With the privatization of Japanese National Railways (JNR) on 1 April 1987, the station came under the control of JR East.

== Passenger statistics ==
In fiscal 2017, the station was used by an average of 2186 passengers daily (boarding passengers only).

== See also ==
- List of railway stations in Japan
