= Oshikiri Station =

Railway station in Nagaoka, Niigata Prefecture, Japan

Oshikiri Station 押切駅
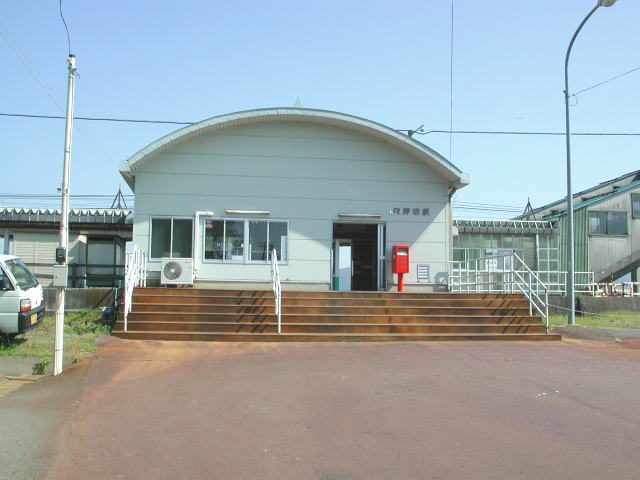
- Oshikiri Station, September 2004

General information
- Location: 1952 Ikenoshima, Nagaoka-shi, Niigata-ken 954-0143; Japan
- Coordinates: 37.5045°N 138.8811°E
- Operator: JR East
- Line: ■ Shin'etsu Main Line
- Distance: 79.9 km from Naoetsu
- Platforms: 2 side platforms
- Tracks: 2

Other information
- Status: Unstaffed
- Website: Official website

History
- Opened: 1 September 1901; 124 years ago

Services
Preceding station	JR East	Following station
Kita-Nagaoka towards Naoetsu	Shin'etsu Main Line Local	Mitsuke towards Niigata
Location
- Location within JR Shinetsu Main Line Location within Japan

Oshikiri Station (押切駅, Oshikiri-eki) is a railway station in the city of Nagaoka, Niigata, Japan, operated by East Japan Railway Company (JR East).

== Lines ==
Oshikiri Station is served by the Shin'etsu Main Line and is 79.9 kilometers from the terminus of the line at Naoetsu Station.

== Station layout ==
The station consists of two ground-level opposed side platforms connected by a footbridge, serving two tracks. The station is unattended.

=== Platforms ===
1	■ Shin'etsu Main Line	for Niigata
3	■ Shin'etsu Main Line	for Nagaoka

== History ==
Oshikiri Station opened on 1 September 1901. With the privatization of Japanese National Railways (JNR) on 1 April 1987, the station came under the control of JR East. The station building dates from 1995.

== Surrounding area ==
- Shingumi Elementary School

== See also ==
- List of railway stations in Japan
