= List of closed railway lines in Japan =

Due to motorization beginning in the 1960s, the completion of the Meishin Expressway, the debut of Boeing 727 planes on domestic flights in Japan, and the depopulation of rural areas, many railway lines in Japan have been forced to close down due to lack of riders and increased costs to maintain the lines. With Japanese National Railways (JNR) building more and more infeasible lines, along with additional Shinkansen lines such as the San'yō Shinkansen, nearly all JNR lines – except for those in the Tokyo area and Shinkansen lines – fell into deficit, putting the existence of JNR at risk. This resulted in movements to close such infeasible railway lines owned by the JNR, such as those known as the Deficit 83 Lines and Specified local lines.

The closure of deficit local lines around Japan continues today, post-disbandment of JNR and formation of Japan Railways Group. In November 2016, JR Hokkaido announced that it was unable to maintain most of its railway lines, with the length of unmaintainable sections exceeding 1,200 km. Deficit railway lines in Japan have largely been replaced by bus services or transferred to third sector companies, although some replacement bus lines have later been closed due to a lack of users.

Between the mid-1990s and fiscal 2025, approximately 1,366 km of railway track across 68 sections—about 5% of Japan’s total network—were discontinued, according to analysis by Kyodo News. The closures were concentrated in rural and depopulating areas, with around one-third of the total length located in Hokkaido.

Data from the Ministry of Land, Infrastructure, Transport and Tourism indicate that the rate of closures has increased over time: 387 km were closed by fiscal 2005, 445 km in the following decade, and 534 km by fiscal 2025.

Of the total discontinued track, 680 km were operated by companies formed after the privatisation of Japanese National Railways, while 686 km were run by other railway operators. In Hokkaido, two local railway companies alone accounted for the closure of 140 km and 116 km of lines, respectively.

== Closed railway lines ==
- This list does not include industrial lines and lines that were transferred to 3rd sector companies that still operate as a railway line.
- Station names use names at the time of line closure.

Name of the line	Photo	Prefecture	Terminus	Length of closed section	Closure date
Aioi Line		Hokkaidō	Bihoro–Kitami-Aioi	36.8 km (22.9 mi)	April 1, 1985
Bikō Line		Hokkaidō	Bifuka–Niupu	21.2 km (13.2 mi)	September 17, 1985
Haboro Line		Hokkaidō	Rumoi–Horonobe	141.1 km (87.7 mi)	March 30, 1987
Hiroo Line		Hokkaidō	Obihiro–Hiroo	84.0 km (52.2 mi)	February 2, 1987
Iburi Line		Hokkaidō	Kutchan–Datemombetsu; Kyōgoku–Wakikata	83.0 km (51.6 mi); 7.5 km (4.7 mi)	November 1, 1986
Iwanai Line		Hokkaidō	Kozawa–Iwanai	14.9 km (9.3 mi)	July 1, 1985
Kōhin'hoku Line		Hokkaidō	Hama-Tombetsu–Kitami-Esashi	30.4 km (18.9 mi)	July 1, 1985
Kōhin'nan Line		Hokkaidō	Ōmu–Okoppe	19.9 km (12.4 mi)	July 15, 1985
Konpoku Line		Hokkaidō	Shiretoko-Shari–Koshikawa	12.8 km (8.0 mi)	December 1, 1970
Manji Line		Hokkaidō	Shibun–Manji-Tanzan	23.8 km (14.8 mi)	April 1, 1985
Setana Line		Hokkaidō	Kunnui–Setana	48.4 km (30.1 mi)	March 16, 1987
Shihoro Line		Hokkaidō	Obihiro–Tokachi-Mitsumata	78.3 km (48.7 mi)	March 23, 1987
Shiranuka Line		Hokkaidō	Shiranuka–Hokushin	33.1 km (20.6 mi)	October 23, 1983
Shokotsu Line		Hokkaidō	Shokotsu–Kitami-Takinoue	34.3 km (21.3 mi)	April 1, 1985
Temiya Line		Hokkaidō	Minami-Otaru–Temiya	2.8 km (1.7 mi)	November 5, 1985
Tomiuchi Line		Hokkaidō	Mukawa–Hidakachō	82.5 km (51.3 mi)	November 1, 1986
Yūmō Line		Hokkaidō	Naka-Yūbetsu–Abashiri	121.8 km (75.7 mi)	March 20, 1987
Sasshō Line		Hokkaidō	Shin-Totsukawa–Ishikari-Numata; Hokkaidō-Iryōdaigaku–Shin-Totsukawa	34.9 km (21.7 mi); 47.6 km (29.6 mi)	June 19, 1972; April 17, 2020
Chihoku Line		Hokkaidō	Ikeda–Kitami	140.0 km (87.0 mi)	Transferred to Hokkaidō Chihoku Kōgen Railway Company on June 4, 1989, then closed on April 21, 2006
Esashi Line		Hokkaidō	Goryōkaku–Kikonai; Kikonai–Esashi	37.8 km (23.5 mi); 42.1 km (26.2 mi)	Transferred to South Hokkaido Railway Company on March 26, 2016. May 12, 2014.
Hakodate Main Line branch		Hokkaidō	Sunagawa–Kami-Sunagawa	7.3 km (4.5 mi)	May 16, 1994
Horonai Line		Hokkaidō	Iwamizawa–Ikushumbetsu; Mikasa–Horonai	18.1 km (11.2 mi); 2.7 km (1.7 mi)	July 13, 1987
Matsumae Line	—	Hokkaidō	Kikonai–Matsumae	50.8 km (31.6 mi)	February 1, 1988
Nayoro Main Line		Hokkaidō	Nayoro–Engaru; Naka-Yūbetsu–Yūbetsu	138.1 (85.8 mi); 4.9 km (3.0 mi)	May 1, 1989
Rumoi Main Line		Hokkaidō	Rumoi–Mashike; Rumoi–Ishikari-Numata; Ishikari-Numata–Fukagawa	16.7 km (10.4 mi); 35.7 km (22.2 mi)	December 4, 2016; April 1, 2023; April 1, 2026
Shibetsu Line		Hokkaidō	Shibecha–Nemuro-Shibetsu; Naka-Shibetsu–Attoko	69.4 km (43.1 mi); 47.5 km (29.5 mi)	April 30, 1989
Shinmei Line		Hokkaidō	Fukagawa–Nayoro	121.8 km (75.7 mi)	September 4, 1995
Tempoku Line		Hokkaidō	Otoineppu–Minami-Wakkanai	148.9 km (92.5 mi)	May 1, 1989
Utashinai Line		Hokkaidō	Sunagawa–Utashinai	14.5 km (9.0 mi)	April 25, 1988
Hakodate Transportation Bureau Shinonome Line	—	Hokkaidō	Horai-Chō–Matsukaze	1.6 km (1.0 mi)	April 1, 1992
Sekishō Line Yūbari branch line		Hokkaidō	Yūbari–Shin-Yūbari	16.1 km (10.0 mi)	March 31, 2019
Nemuro Main Line (Partial)		Hokkaidō	Furano–Shintoku	81.7 km	April 1, 2024
Ugo Kōtsū Ogachi Line	-	Akita	Nishimonai–Fumoto; Yuzawa–Nishimonai	2.8 km (1.3 mi); 8.9 km (5.5 mi)	December 1, 1967; April 1, 1973
Yamagata Kōtsū Takahata Line		Yamagata	Takahata–Niijyuku; Nukanome–Takahata	10.4 km (6.4 mi); 5.2 km (3.2 mi)	October 1, 1968; November 18, 1974
Yamagata Kōtsū Obanazawa Line	-	Yamagata	Ōishida–Obanazawa	2.6 km (1.6 mi)	September 10, 1970
Ugo Kōtsū Ousyou Line	-	Akita	Yokote–Numadate	15.3 km (9.5 mi)	July 20, 1971
Hanamaki Dentetsu Line		Iwate	Hanamaki–Hanamaki-Onsen	8.2 km (5.0 mi)	February 16, 1972
Kawamata Line		Fukushima	Matsukawa–Iwashiro-Kawamata	12.2 km (7.6 mi)	May 14, 1972
Yamagata Kōtsū Sanzan Line		Yamagata	Uzen-Takamatsu–Mazawa	11.4 km (7.1 mi)	November 18, 1974
Shōnai Kōtsū Yunohama Line		Yamagata	Tsuruoka–Yunohama-Onsen	12.3 km (7.6 mi)	April 1, 1975
Niccyū Line		Fukushima	Kitagata–Atsushio	11.6 km (7.2 mi)	April 1, 1984
Kōnan Railway Kuroishi Line		Aomori	Kawabe–Kuroishi	6.2 km (3.9 mi)	April 1, 1998
Shimokita Kōtsu Ōhata Line		Aomori	Shimokita–Ōhata	18.0 km (11.2 mi)	April 1, 2001
Nanbu Jūkan Railway Nanbu Jūkan Railway Line		Aomori	Noheji–Shichinohe	20.9 km (13.0 mi)	August 1, 2002
Kurihara Den'en Railway Line		Miyagi	Ishikoshi–Hosokura Mine Park Mae	25.7 km (16.0 mi)	April 1, 2007
Kosaka Smelting & Refining Kosaka Line		Akita	Ōdate–Kosaka	22.3 km (13.9 mi)	April 1, 2009
Towada Kankō Electric Railway Line		Aomori	Misawa–Towadashi	14.7 km (9.1 mi)	April 1, 2012
Iwaizumi Line		Iwate	Moichi–Iwaizumi	38.4 km (23.8 mi)	April 1, 2014
Ōfunato Line (Partial)		Iwate	Kesennuma–Sakari	43.7 km (27.1 mi)	April 1, 2020
Kesennuma Line (Partial)		Miyagi	Yanaizu–Kesennuma	55.3 km (34.3 mi)	April 1, 2020
Agatsuma Line branch line		Gunma	Naganohara–Ōshi	5.8 km (3.6 mi)	May 1, 1971
Chūō Main Line branch lines		Tokyo	Kokubunji–Tōkyō-Keibajyō-Mae; Kita-Fuchū–Shimogawara	5.6 km (3.5 mi); 3.8 km (2.4 mi)	April 1, 1973; September 20, 1976
Itsukaichi Line branch line		Tokyo	Musashi-Itsukaichi–Musashi-Iwai	2.7 km (1.6 mi)	November 15, 1982
Sagami Line branch line		Kanagawa	Samukawa–Nishi-Samukawa	1.5 km (0.9 mi)	March 31, 1984
Odakyū Mukōgaoka-Yūen Monorail Line		Kanagawa	Mukōgaoka-Yūen–Mūkōgaoka-Yūen Seimon	1.1 km (0.6 mi)	February 1, 2001
Hitachi Dentetsu Line		Ibaraki	Ōmika–Jōhoku-Ōta, Ayukawa	18.1 km (11.2 mi)	April 1, 2005
Kashima Railway Line		Ibaraki	Ishioka–Hokota	26.9 km (16.7 mi)	April 1, 2007
Ueno Zoo Monorail		Tokyo	Ueno Zoo East–Ueno Zoo West	0.3 km (0.18 mi)	December 27, 2023
Yanagase Line		Fukui; Shiga	Tsuruga–Kinomoto	26.1 km (16.1 mi)	May 11, 1964
Akatani Line		Niigata	Shibata–Higashi-Akatani	18.9 km (11.7 mi)	April 1, 1984
Uonuma Line		Niigata	Raikōji–Nishi-Ojiya	12.6 km (7.8 mi)	April 1, 1984
Shimizukō Line		Shizuoka	Shimizu–Miho	8.3 km (5.2 mi)	April 1, 1984
Yahiko Line (partial)	-	Niigata	Higashi-Sanjō–Echigo-Nagasawa	7.9 km (4.9 mi)	April 1, 1985
Niigata Kōtsū Densya Line		Niigata	Hakusan-Mae–Higashi-Sekiya	36.1 km (22.4 mi)	April 1, 1993
Shin'etsu Main Line (Partial)		Gunma; Nagano	Yokokawa–Karuizawa	11.7 km (7.2 mi)	October 1, 1997
Tokaido Main Line branch line (Partial)	-	Aichi	Nagoya kamotsu Terminal–Nishi Nagoyakō	7.0 km (4.3 mi)	March 31, 2001
Noto Railway Nanao Line (Partial)		Ishikawa	Nanao–Anamizu	20.4 km (12.6 mi)	April 1, 2001
Meitetsu Ibi Line		Gifu	Chūsetsu–Hon-Ibi	12.7 km (7.8 mi)	October 1, 2001 (~Hon-Ibi); April 1, 2005 (Entire Line)
Meitetsu Tanigumi Line		Gifu	Kurono–Tanigumi	7.6 km (4.7 mi)	October 1, 2001
Meitetsu Yaotsu Line		Gifu	Akechi–Yaotsu	7.3 km (4.5 mi)	October 1, 2001
Meitetsu Takehana Line (Partial)		Gifu	Egira–Ōsu	6.7 km (4.1 mi)	October 1, 2001
Nagano Electric Railways Kato Line		Nagano	Yashiro–Kishima	50.4 km (31.3 mi)	April 1, 2002 (Shinshu-Nakano–Kishima)
Keifuku Electric Railroad Eiheiji Line		Fukui	Kanazuchi–Eiheiji	24.6 km (15.2 mi)	September 18, 1969 (Kanazuchi–Higashifuruguchi); October 21, 2002 (Higashifuruguchi–Eiheiji)
Meitetsu Mikawa Line (Partial)		Aichi	Hekinan–Kira-Yoshida; Sanage–Nishi-Nakagane	25.0 km (15.5 mi)	April 1, 2004
Meitetsu Gifu Shinai Line		Gifu	Gifueki-Mae–Nagarakitamachi, Chūsetsu	7.6 km (4.7 mi)	April 1, 2005
Meitetsu Minomachi Line		Gifu	Tetsumeichō–Seki	18.8 km (11.6 mi)	April 1, 2005
Meitetsu Tagami Line		Gifu	Tagami–Keirinjo-Mae	1.4 km (0.8 mi)	April 1, 2005
Noto Line		Ishikawa	Anamizu–Takojima	61.0 km (37.9 mi)	April 1, 2005
Tōkadai Shin-kōtsū Peach Liner		Aichi	Komaki–Tōkadai-Higashi	7.4 km (4.6 mi)	October 1, 2006
Kamioka Line		Gifu	Inotani–Okuhida-Onsenguchi	19.9 km (12.4 mi)	December 1, 2006
Meitetsu Monkey Park Monorail Line		Aichi	Inuyama-Yūen–Dōbutsuen	1.2 km (0.75 mi)	December 28, 2008
Hokuriku Railroad Ishikawa Line (Partial)		Ishikawa	Tsurugi–Kaga-Ichinomiya	2.1 km (1.3 mi)	November 1, 2009
Yashiro Line		Nagano	Yashiro–Suzaka	24.4 km (15.2 mi)	April 1, 2012
Sasayama Line		Hyogo	Sasayamaguchi–Fukusumi	17.6 km (10.9 mi)	March 1, 1972
Maizuru Line branch line		Kyoto	Higashi-Maizuru–Naka-Maizuru	3.4 km (2.1 mi)	November 1, 1972
Wakayama Line (Old route)	-	Wakayama	Tainose–Kiwa	Unknown	October 1974
Fukuchiyama Line branch line		Hyogo	Tsukaguchi–Amazaki-kō	4.6 km (2.8 mi)	February 1, 1984
Takasago Line		Hyogo	Kakogawa–Takasago-kō	8.0 km (4.9 mi)	December 1, 1984
Bantan Line (Branch line)		Hyogo	Himeji–Shikamakō	5.6 km (3.5 mi)	October 31, 1986
Kajiya Line		Hyogo	Nomura–Kajiya	13.2 km (8.2 mi)	April 1, 1990
Katamachi Line (partial)		Osaka	Kyōbashi–Katamachi	0.5 km (0.3 mi)	March 8, 1997
Wakayamako Line (partial)		Wakayama	Wakayamako–Suiken	2.6 km (1.6 mi)	May 26, 2002
Arita Tetsudo Arita Tetsudo Line		Wakayama	Fujinami–Kanayaguchi	5.6 km (3.4 mi)	January 1, 2003
Miki Railway Miki Line		Hyogo	Yakujin–Miki	6.6 km (4.1 mi)	April 1, 2008
Ujina Line (JNR)		Hiroshima	Hiroshima–Ujina	5.9 km (3.7 mi)	April 1, 1972, freight services terminated October 1, 1986.
Shimotsui Dentetsu Shimotsui Line		Okayama	Kojima–Chayamachi; Shimotsui–Kojima	14.5 km (9.0 mi); 16.5 km (10.2 mi)	April 1, 1972; January 1, 1991
Kurayoshi Line		Tottori	Kurayoshi–Yamamori	20.0 km (12.4 mi)	April 1, 1985
Taisha Line (JR West)		Shimane	Izumoshi–Taisha	7.5 km (4.7 mi)	April 1, 1990
Katakami Line		Okayama	Katakami–Yanahara	33.8 km (21.0 mi)	July 1, 1990
Mine Line (branch line)		Yamaguchi	Minami-Ōmine–Ōmine	2.8 km (1.7 mi)	April 1, 1997
Kabe Line (partial)		Hiroshima	Kabe–Sandankyō	46.2 km (28.7 mi)	December 1, 2003
Sankō Line		Shimane; Hiroshima	Gōtsu–Miyoshi	108.1 km (67.1 mi)	April 1, 2018
Skyrail Midorizaka Line		Hiroshima	Midoriguchi–Midori-Chuo	1.3 km (0.8 mi)	May 1, 2024
Kajiyabara Line		Tokushima	Itano–Kajiyabara	6.9 km (4.3 mi)	January 16, 1972
Komatsushima Line		Tokushima	Nakata–Komatsushima	1.9 km (1.2 mi)	March 14, 1985
Uchiko Line (Partial)		Ehime	Gorō–Niiya	0.2 km (0.1 mi)	March 2, 1986

== Closed railway lines in Kyūshū, Okinawa ==
Name of the line	Photo	Prefecture	Terminus	Length of closed section	Closure date
Ashiya Line		Fukuoka	Ongagawa–Chikuzen-Ashiya	6.2 km (3.9 mi)	April 1, 1961
Yunoki Line		Nagasaki	Hidariishi–Yunoki	3.9 km (2.4 mi)	September 1, 1967
Koubukuro Line		Fukuoka	Kotake–Futase; Koubukuro–Ikisu	7.6 km (4.7 mi) and 2.5 km (1.5 mi) (freight branch)	December 8, 1969
Karatsu Line branch line		Saga	Yamamoto–Kishitake	4.1 km (2.5 mi)	August 20, 1971
Usunoura Line		Nagasaki	Saza–Usunoura	3.8 km (2.4 mi)	December 26, 1971
Sechibaru Line		Nagasaki	Yoshii–Sechibaru	6.7 km (4.2 mi)	December 26, 1971
Ōita Kōtsū Yabakei Line		Ōita	Nakatsu–Morizane-Onsen	36.1 km (22.4 mi)	October 1, 1975
Chikuhi Line (Partial)			Hakata–Meinohama; Nijinomatsubara–Yamamoto	TBA	March 22, 1983
Makurazaki Line			Ijūin–Makurazaki	49.6 km (30.8 mi)	March 18, 1984
Tsuma Line			Sadowara–Sugiyasu	19.3 km (12.0 mi)	December 1, 1984
Miyanoharu Line			Era–Higo-Okuni	26.6 km (16.5 mi)	December 1, 1984
Katsuki Line			Nakama–Katsuki	3.5 km (2.2 mi)	April 1, 1985
Muroki Line			Ongagawa–Muroki	11.2 km (7.0 mi)	April 1, 1985
Soeda Line			Kawara–Soeda	12.1 km (7.5 mi)	April 1, 1985
Katsuta Line			Yoshizuka–Chikuzen-Katsuta	13.8 km (8.6 mi)	April 1, 1985
Yabe Line			Hainuzuka–Kurogi	19.7 km (12.2 mi)	April 1, 1985
Kikuchi Line (Partial)			Miyoshi–Kikuchi	10.6 km (6.6 mi)	February 16, 1986
Urushio Line			Shimo-Kamoo–Shimo-Yamada	7.9 km (4.9 mi)	April 1, 1986
Miyanojyō Line			Sendai–Satsuma-Ōkuchi	66.1 km (41.1 mi)	January 10, 1987
Ōsumi Line			Kokubu–Shibushi	98.3 km (61.1 mi)	March 14, 1987
Saga Line			Saga–Setaka	24.1 km (14.9 mi)	March 28, 1987
Shibushi Line			Nishi-Miyakonojyō–Shibushi	38.6 km (24.0 mi)	March 28, 1987
Yamano Line			Minamata–Kurino	55.7 km (34.6 mi)	February 1, 1988
Kami-Yamada Line			Iizuka–Buzen-Kawasaki	25.9 km (16.0 mi)	September 1, 1988
Miyada Line			Katsuno–Chikuzen-Miyada	5.3 km (3.3 mi)	December 23, 1989
Hososhima Line			Hyūgashi–Hososhima	3.5 km (2.2 mi)	December 1, 1993
Nishi Nippon Railroad Kita-Kyūshū Line			Kurosaki-Ekimae–Orio	5.1 km (3.1 mi)	November 26, 2000
Nishitetsu Kaizuka Line (partial)			Nishitetsu-Shingū–Tsuyazaki	9.9 km (6.1 mi)	April 1, 2007
Takachiho Railway Line			Nobeoka–Takachiho	50.0 km (31.1 mi)	September 6, 2007 (Nobeoka-Makimine); December 28, 2008 (Rest of the line)
Shimabara Railway Line (partial)			Shimabarakō–Kazusa	35.3 km (21.9 mi)	April 1, 2008

== Railway lines to be closed ==
These lines have

- Kōnan Railway Ōwani Line
  - Ōwani-Chūō-Hirosaki 13.9 km (8.6 mi) to be indefinitely suspended on April 1, 2028.
- Hakodate Main Line
  - Oshamanbe–Otaru 140.2 km (87.1 mi) closing upon the extension of Hokkaidō Shinkansen.
- Kururi Line
  - Kururi-Kazusa-Kameyama 9.6 km closing at April 2027.

== See also ==
- Specified local lines
- Deficit 83 Lines

== Notes ==
1. Although Kato Line was closed, the line was technically split into several lines, where the "Yashiro Line" section became an actual line after the closure of the Kato Line and the "Kishima Line" section, and the remaining section was incorporated into Nagano Line. As of 2024, only the section between Suzaka and Yudanaka remains in operation.
2. The length of the entire former line, including sections that still operate as a part of Nagano line.
3. Kabe–Aki-Kameyama rebuilt and reopened on March 4, 2017.
