= Meitetsu Okoshi Line =

Tram line operated by Meitetsu from 1914 to 1954

Okoshi Line
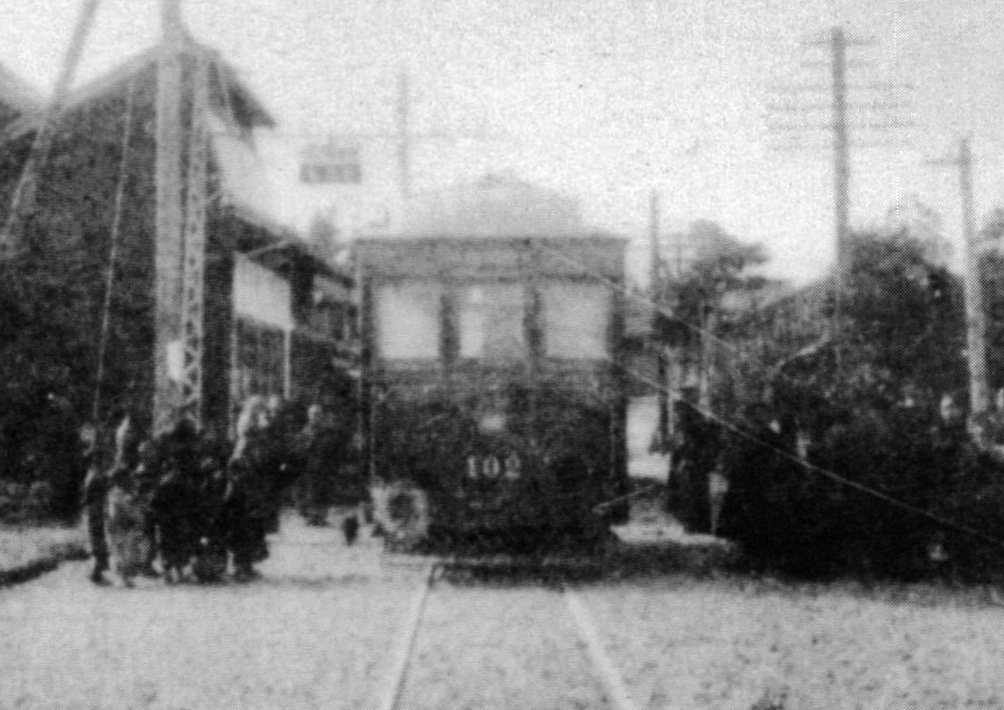
- View of the Okoshi Station

Overview
- Status: Closed, replaced with Meitetsu Bus routes
- Termini: Shin-Ichinomiya/Hachiman-cho (Current Meitetsu Ichinomiya); Okoshi
- Former connections: Meitetsu Bisai Line and Meitetsu Nagoya Main Line via Meitetsu Ichinomiya Station
- Stations: 10

Service
- Type: Tram
- Operator(s): Meitetsu

History
- Opened: September 22, 1914
- Closed: June 1, 1954

Technical
- Track length: 5.3 km (3.3 mi)
- Track gauge: 1,067 mm (3 ft 6 in)
- Electrification: 600 V DC, overhead catenary

Meitetsu Okoshi Line (Japanese: 名鉄起線, Hepburn: Meitetsu Okoshi-sen) was a 5.3 km long tram line that was operated by Meitetsu from 1914 to 1954, when it was replaced with a bus line due to there being too many riders to handle with a single-tracked tram line. The line connected the current Meitetsu Ichinomiya Station in Ichinomiya with Okoshi Station in Okoshi, Nakashima District (currently a part of Ichinomiya).

== History ==
Construction and operation of the line was approved on August 5, 1921. On March 25, 1922, a company named Soto Electric Railways was established to construct the line. This company was absorbed by Meitetsu in 1923. The line opened on February 1, 1924, as Soto Line. The line had through service to Shin-Ichinomiya Station (current-day Ichinomiya Station) from 1930 to 1952, when the through service was abolished due to changes in electrification voltage on the Meitetsu Bisai Line, which the services on the Okoshi line used to reach Shin-Ichinomiya. As the line was entirely single-tracked, it lacked capacity to meet growing demands. However, duplication of tracks was not possible due to problems with the road being too narrow. When Meitetsu suspended all tram services and tested replacing the line with bus services in June 1953, the bus route was able to adapt to growing ridership with relatively lower costs. Due to this success of the bus routes, the line was abolished on June 1, 1954, and fully replaced with Meitetsu Bus. Cases where railway lines were replaced with buses due to high ridership are rare in Japan.

== Stations ==
The line had a total of 10 stations (not counting Shin-Ichinomiya), all in Aichi Prefecture.

Station	Japanese	Distance from Hachiman-cho (km)	Notes	Location
Shin-Ichinomiya	新一宮	-0.3	Through service abolished on December 24, 1952; Connection with Meitetsu Bisai Line and Tokaido Main Line via Ichinomiya Station	Ichinomiya
Hachimancho	八幡町	0.0	Station formerly named Ichinomiya from 1924 to 1949.	Ichinomiya
Ichinomiya-byouin-mae	一宮病院前	1.0	Opened in 1929. Station formerly named Toyo-Bouseki-mae since its opening to 1949.	Ichinomiya
Mabiki	馬引	1.7		Yamato, Nakashima District (Merged into Ichinomiya)
Kagoya	籠屋	2.4		Okoshi, Nakashima District (Merged into Ichinomiya)
Owari-Sanjo	尾張三条	2.9		Okoshi, Nakashima District (Merged into Ichinomiya)
Nishi-Sanjo	西三条	3.4		Okoshi, Nakashima District (Merged into Ichinomiya)
Shin-Sanjo	新三条	3.6		Okoshi, Nakashima District (Merged into Ichinomiya)
Owari-Nakajima	尾張中島	4.3		Okoshi, Nakashima District (Merged into Ichinomiya)
Nishi-Nakajima	西中島	4.8	Opened in 1930 as Kogyogakko-mae. Renamed to Nishi-Nakajima in 1949.	Okoshi, Nakashima District (Merged into Ichinomiya)
Okoshi	起	5.3		Okoshi, Nakashima District (Merged into Ichinomiya)

== See also ==
- List of closed railway lines in Japan
