= Maekawa Station =

Railway station in Nagaoka, Niigata Prefecture, Japan

Maekawa Station 前川駅
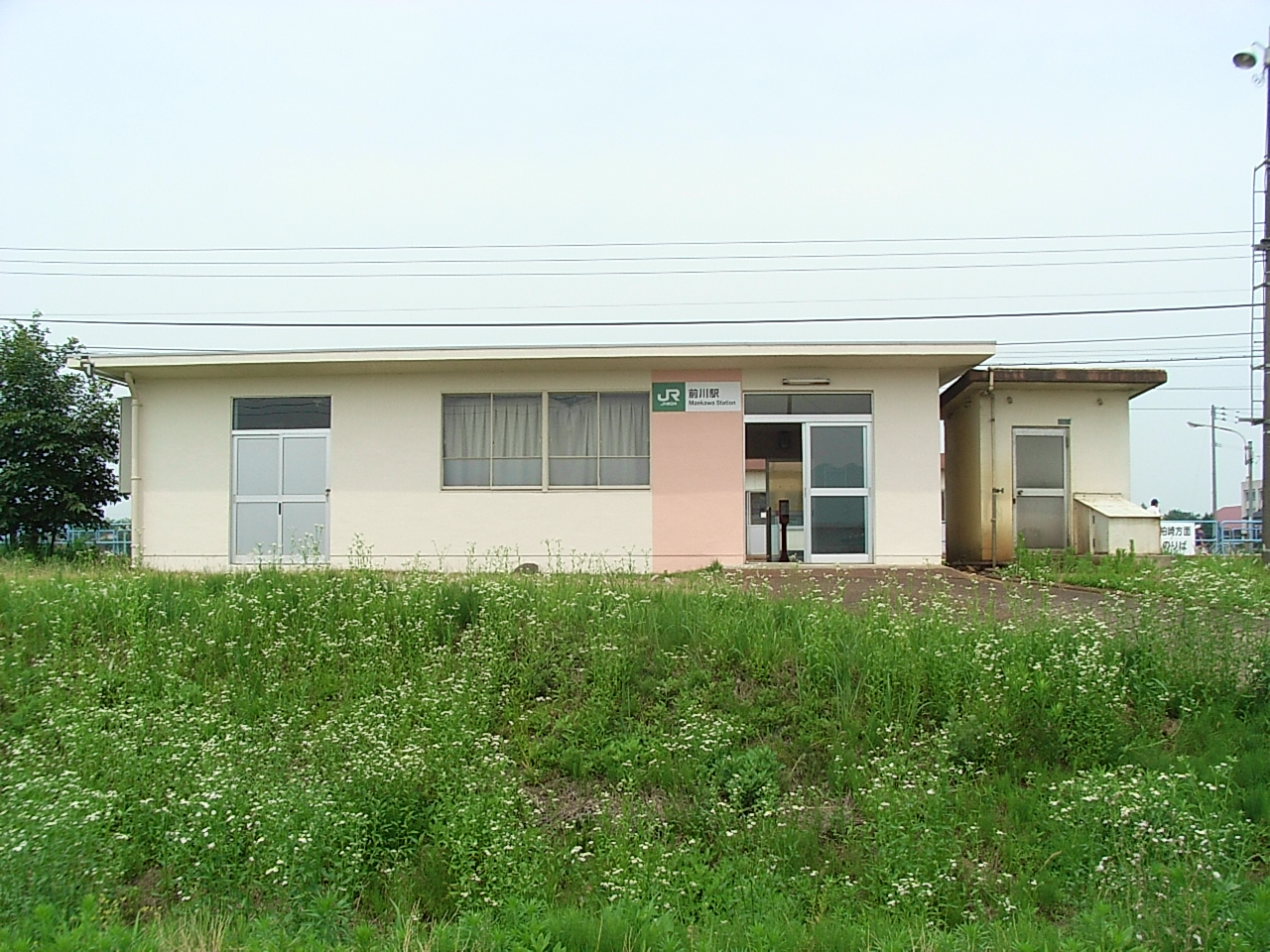
- Maekawa Station, June 2009

General information
- Location: Kamimaejima-machii, Nagaoka-shi, Niigata-ken 940-1144; Japan
- Coordinates: 37.4019°N 138.8238°E
- Operator: JR East
- Line: ■ Shin'etsu Main Line
- Platforms: 2 side platforms
- Tracks: 2

Other information
- Status: Unstaffed
- Website: Official website

History
- Opened: 15 August 1964; 62 years ago

Services
Preceding station	JR East	Following station
Raikōji towards Naoetsu	Shin'etsu Main Line Local	Miyauchi towards Niigata
Location
- Location within JR Shinetsu Main Line Location within Japan

Maekawa Station (前川駅, Maekawa-eki) is a railway station in the city of Nagaoka, Niigata, Japan, operated by East Japan Railway Company (JR East).

== Lines ==
Maekawa Station is served by the Shin'etsu Main Line and is 67.4 kilometers from the terminus of the line at Naoetsu Station.

== Station layout ==
The station consists of two ground-level opposed side platforms connected by an underground passage. The station is unattended.

=== Platforms ===
1	■ Shin'etsu Main Line	for Kashiwazaki, Naoetsu
2	■ Shin'etsu Main Line	for Nagaoka, Niigata

== History ==
Maekawa Station opened on 15 August 1964. With the privatization of Japanese National Railways (JNR) on 1 April 1987, the station came under the control of JR East.

== Surrounding area ==
- Niigata Prefectural Driver's License Centre, Nagaoka branch

== See also ==
- List of railway stations in Japan
