= Ōura Station (Niigata) =

Former railway station in Sanjō, Niigata Prefecture, Japan

Ōura Station 大浦駅
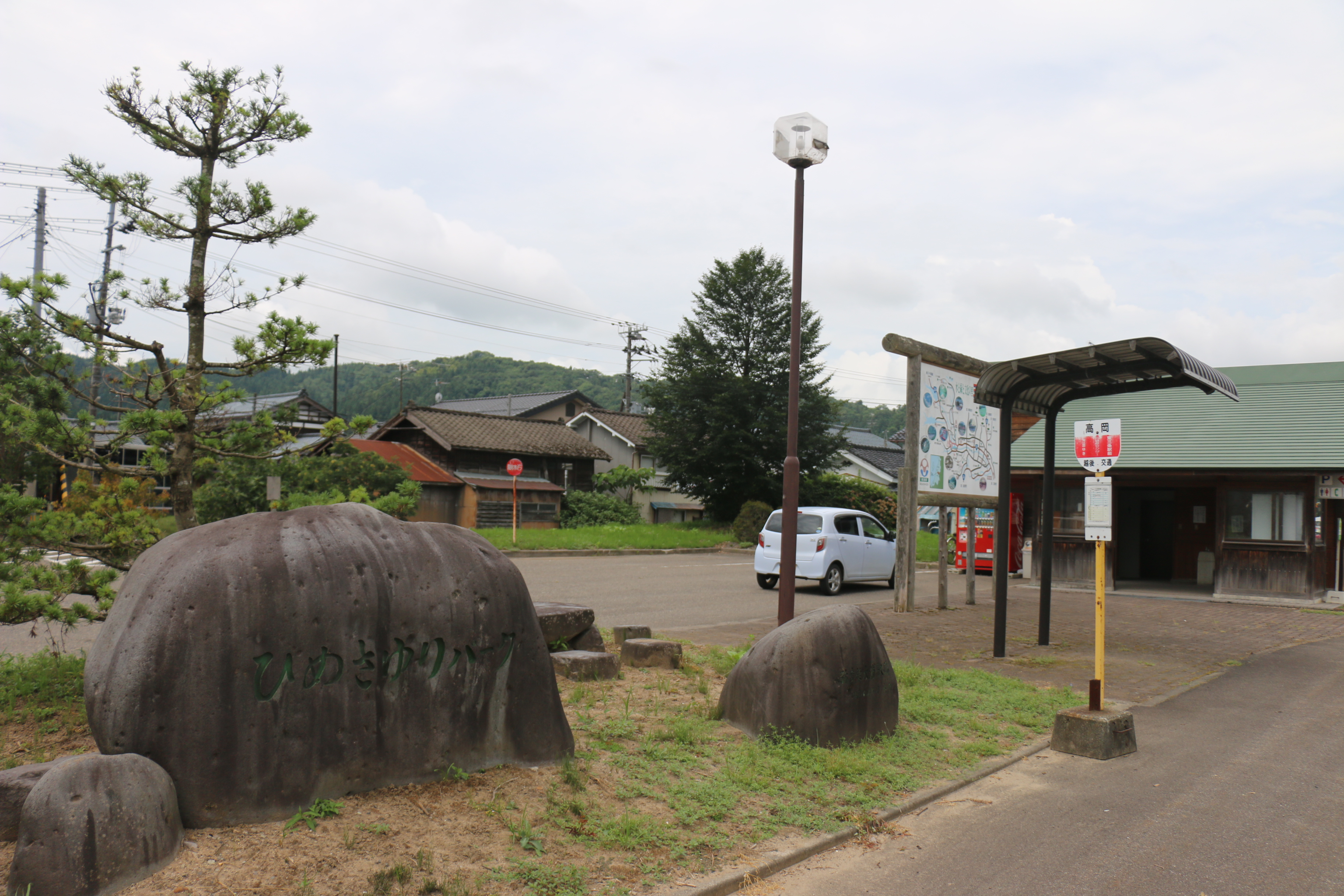
- The site of the station in August 2016

General information
- Location: Takaoka, Sanjō, Niigata （三条市高岡） Japan
- Coordinates: 37°35′47″N 139°00′14″E
- Operator: Japanese National Railways
- Line: Yahiko Line
- Distance: 22.4 km from Yahiko
- Platforms: 1 side platform
- Tracks: 1

History
- Opened: 31 July 1927
- Closed: 1 April 1985

Passengers
- FY1981: 42 daily

Former services
Preceding station	JNR	Following station
Echigo-Ōsaki towards Yahiko	Yahiko Line	Echigo-Nagasawa Terminus
Location
- Location within JR Yahiko Line Location within Japan

Ōura Station (大浦駅, Ōura-eki) was a train station located in Sanjō, Niigata, Japan.

== Lines ==
- Japanese National Railways
  - Yahiko Line (Closed section)

== History ==
The station was opened on July 31, 1927 and closed on April 1, 1985.
