= Miyauchi Station (Niigata) =

Railway station in Nagaoka, Niigata Prefecture, Japan

Miyauchi Station 宮内駅
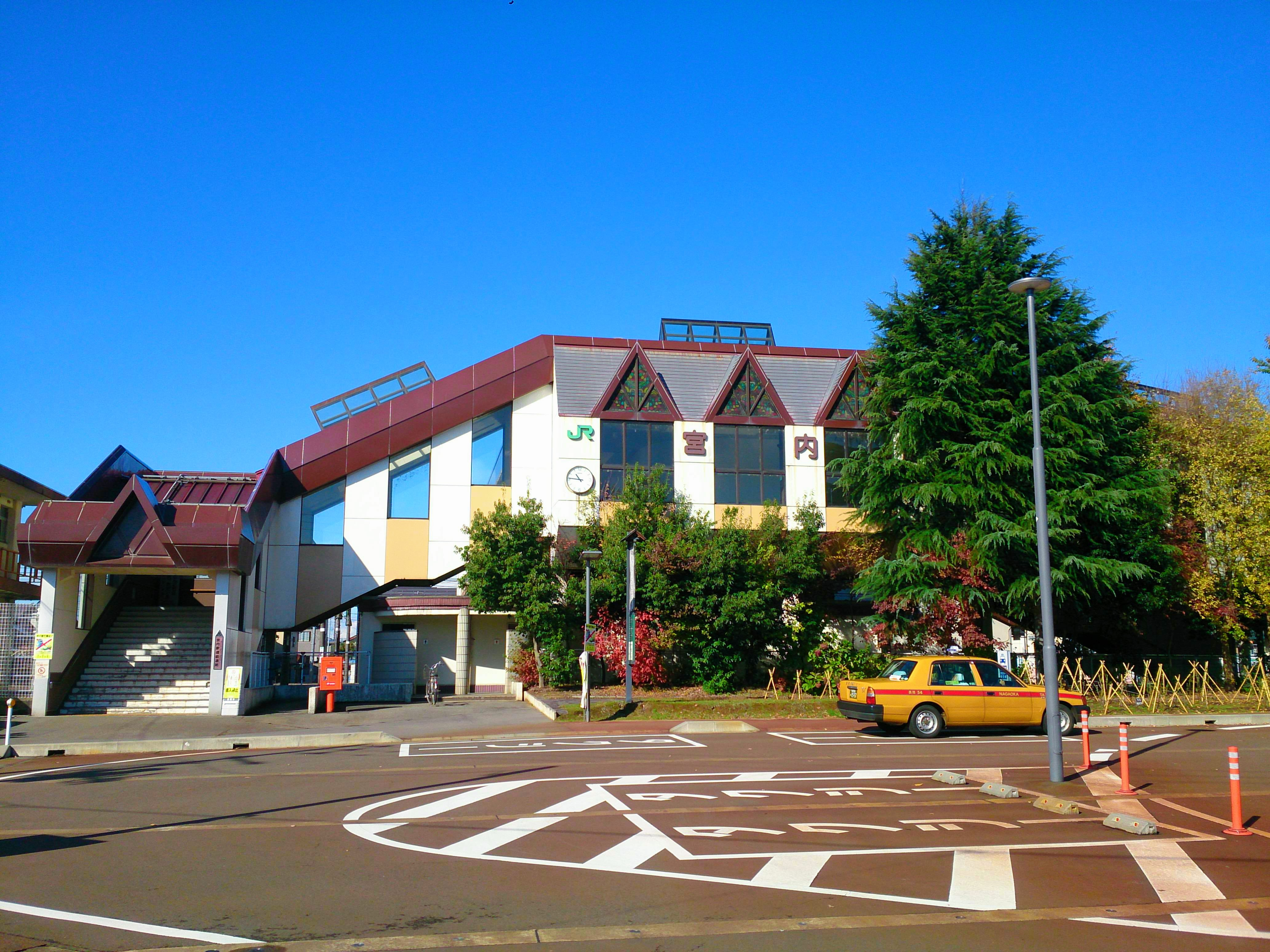
- Miyauchi Station east entrance in November 2018

General information
- Location: 3-4-1 Miyauchi, Nagaoka-shi, Niigata-ken 940-1106; Japan
- Coordinates: 37.4221°N 138.8399°E
- Operator: JR East
- Lines: ■ Shin'etsu Main Line; ■ Jōetsu Line
- Distance: 70.0 km from Naoetsu
- Platforms: 1 side + 2 island platforms
- Tracks: 2

Other information
- Status: Staffed
- Website: Official website

History
- Opened: 27 December 1898; 127 years ago

Passengers
- FY2017: 976 daily

Services
Preceding station	JR East	Following station
Raikōji towards Naoetsu	Shin'etsu Main Line Rapid	Nagaoka towards Niigata
Maekawa towards Naoetsu	Shin'etsu Main Line Local	Nagaoka towards Niigata
Echigo-Takiya towards Takasaki	Jōetsu Line	Nagaoka Terminus
Location
- Location within JR Shinetsu Main Line Location within Japan

Miyauchi Station (宮内駅, Miyauchi-eki) is a railway station in the city of Nagaoka, Niigata, Japan, operated by East Japan Railway Company (JR East).

== Lines ==
Miyauchi Station is served by the Shin'etsu Main Line and the Jōetsu Line. It is 162.6 kilometers from the terminus of the Jōetsu Line at Takasaki and is 70.0 kilometers from the terminus on the Shin'etsu Main Line at Naoetsu.

== Station layout ==
The station consists of one ground-level side platform and two island platforms serving five tracks. The platforms are connected by a footbridge.

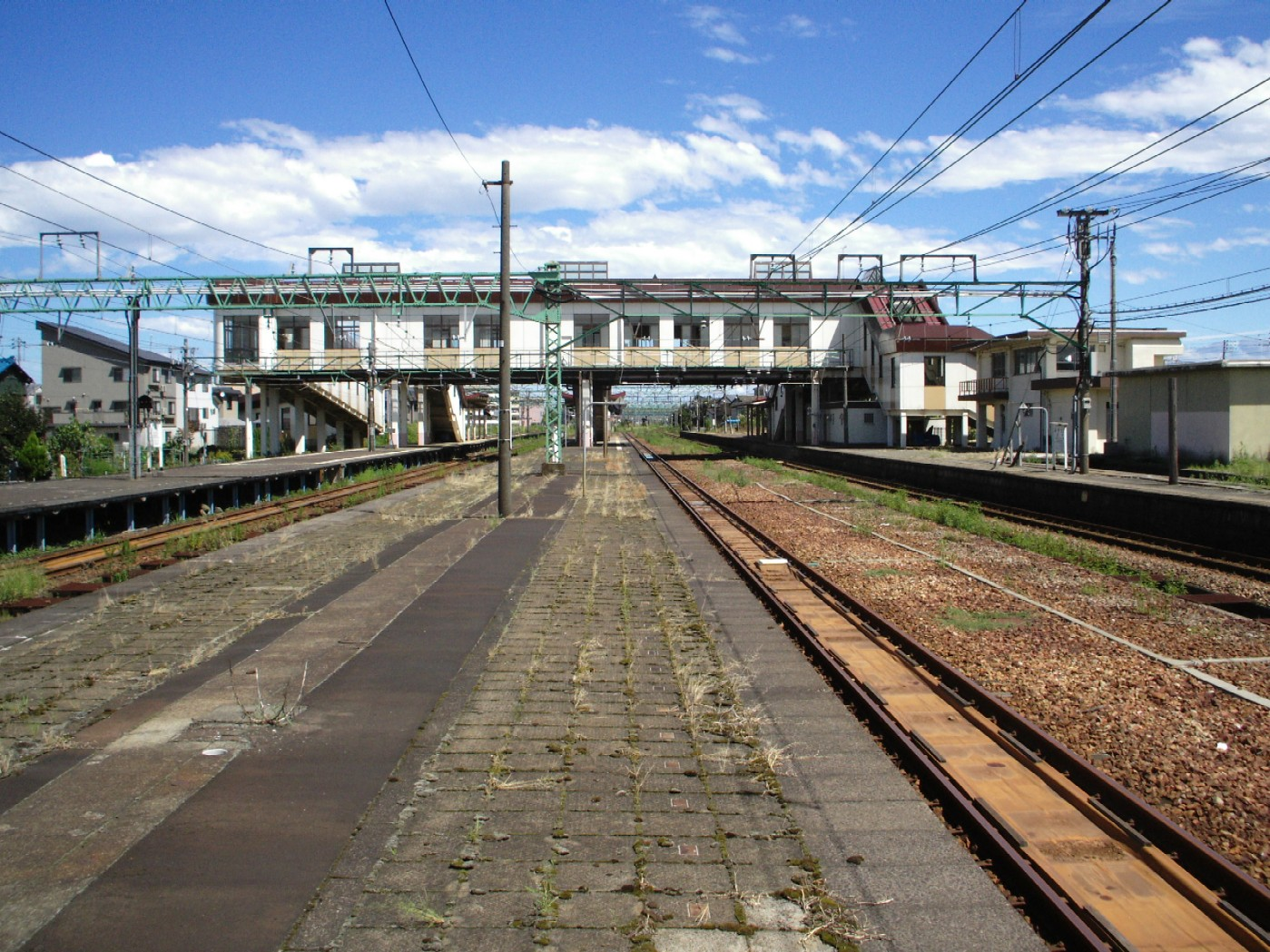
Platforms

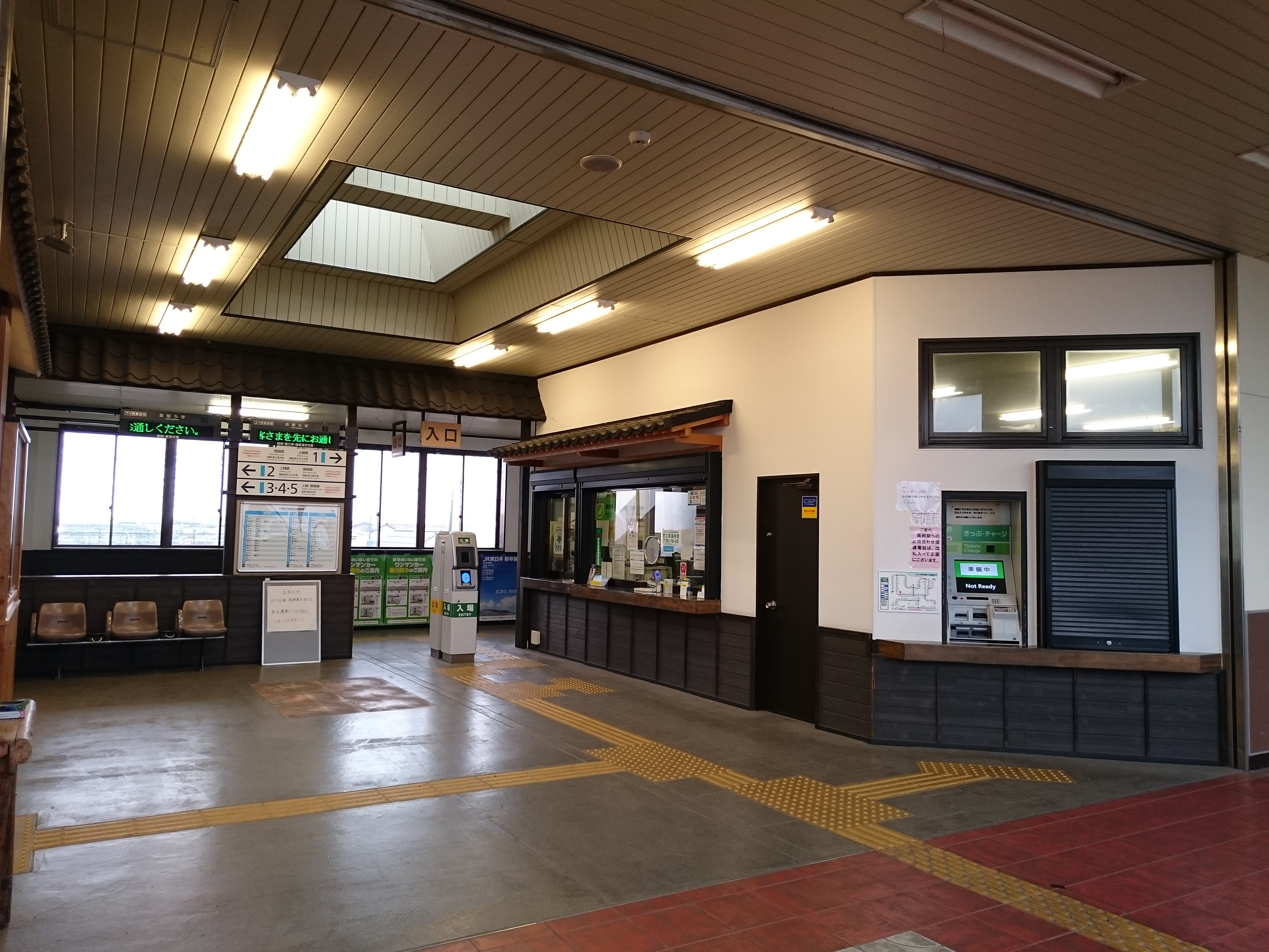
Station interior, April 2019

=== Platforms ===
1, 2	■ Shin'etsu Main Line	for Kashiwazaki and Naoetsu
1, 2	■ Jōetsu Line	for Echigo-Yuzawa and Minakami
3, 4, 5	■ Shin'etsu Main Line	for Nagaoka and Niigata

== History ==
The station opened on 27 December 1898. With the privatization of Japanese National Railways (JNR) on 1 April 1987, the station came under the control of JR East. The current station building was completed in 1992.

== Passenger statistics ==
In fiscal 2017, the station was used by an average of 972 passengers daily (boarding passengers only).

== Surrounding area ==
- Miyauchi Post Office
- Miyauchi Elementary School
- Miyauchi Middle School
- Nagaoka Ginger Ramen
- Settaya - district famous for Kura (storehouse) and Sake
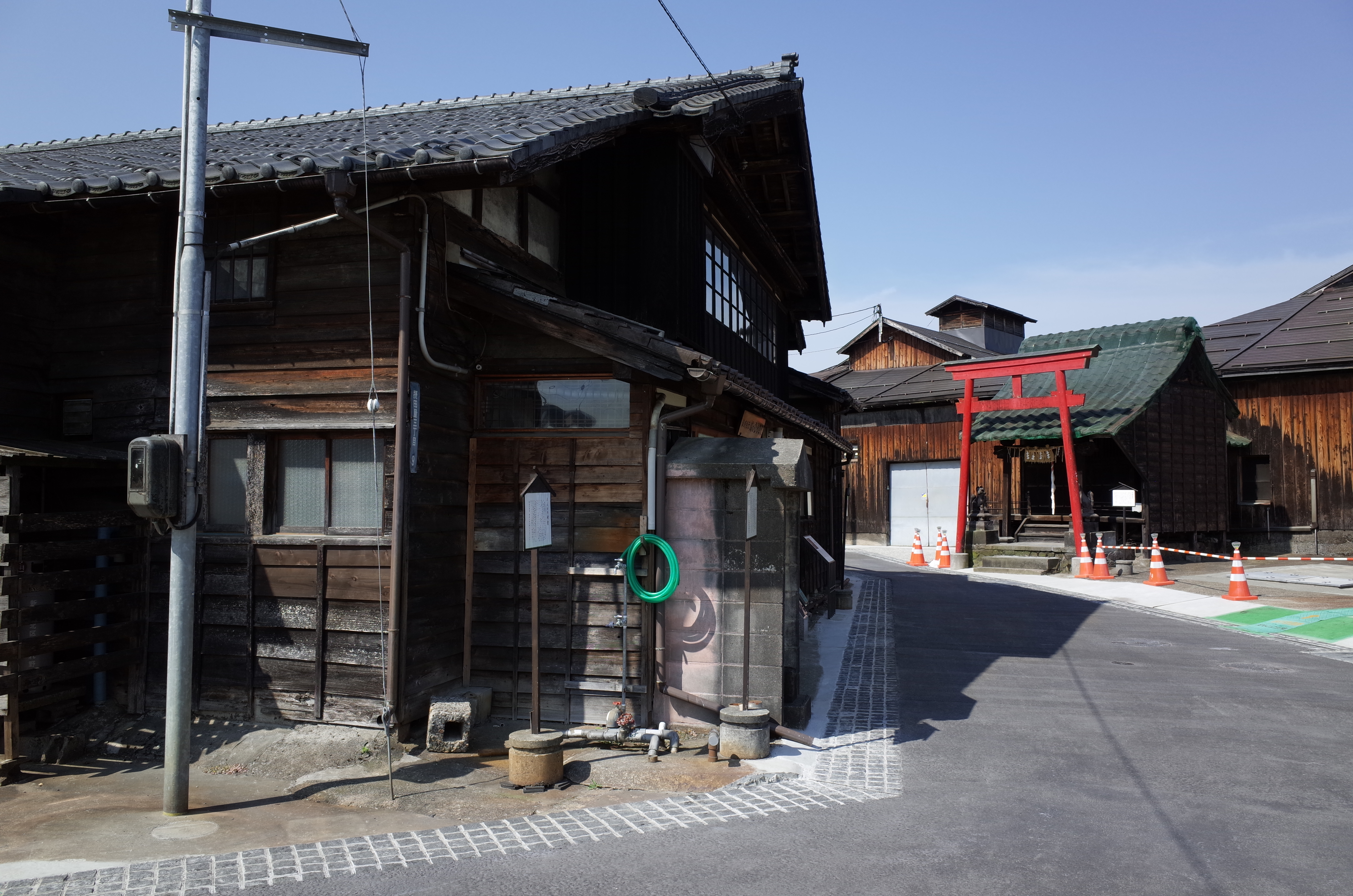
Streetscape of Settaya

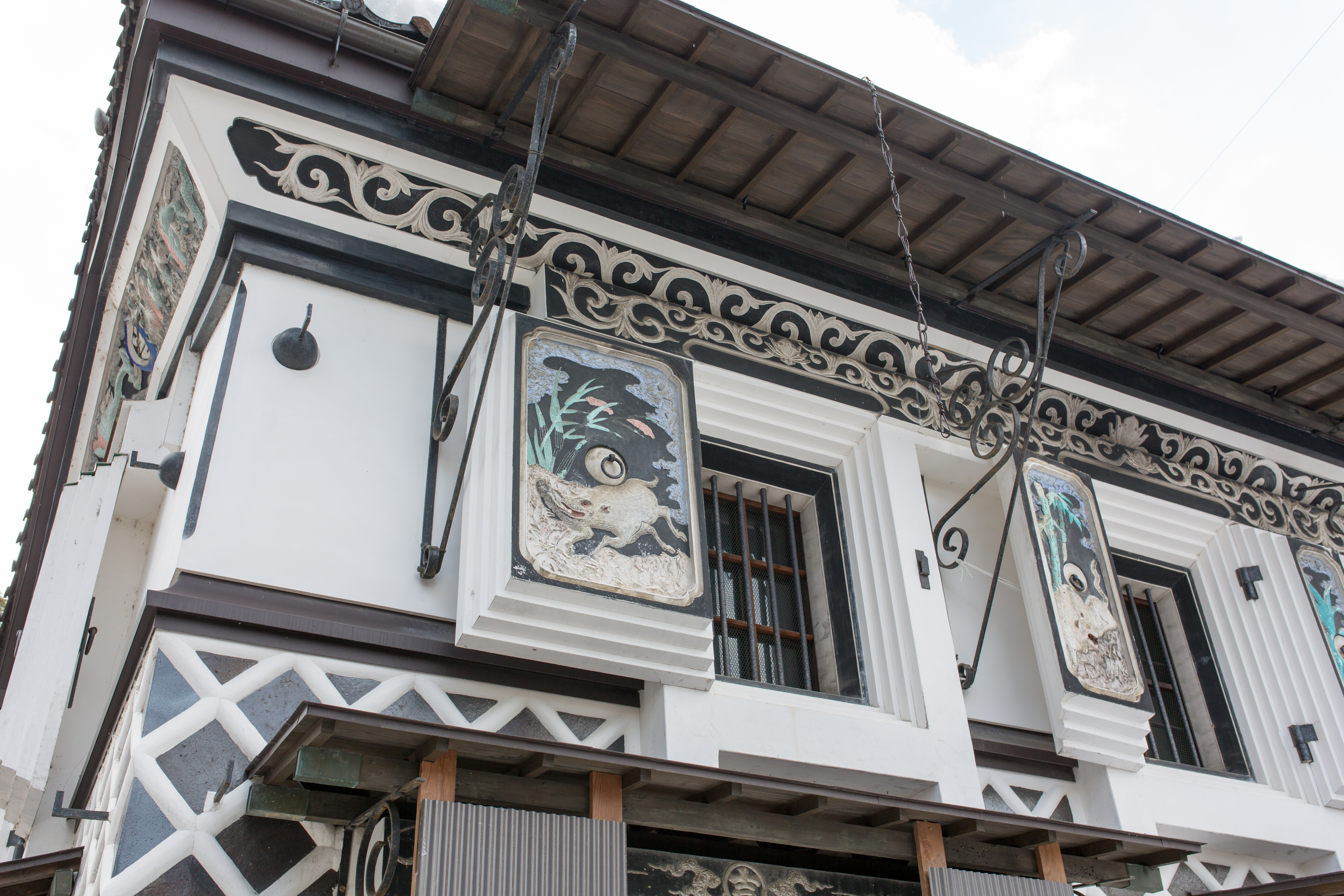
Storehouse of Quina Saffron Winery in Settaya

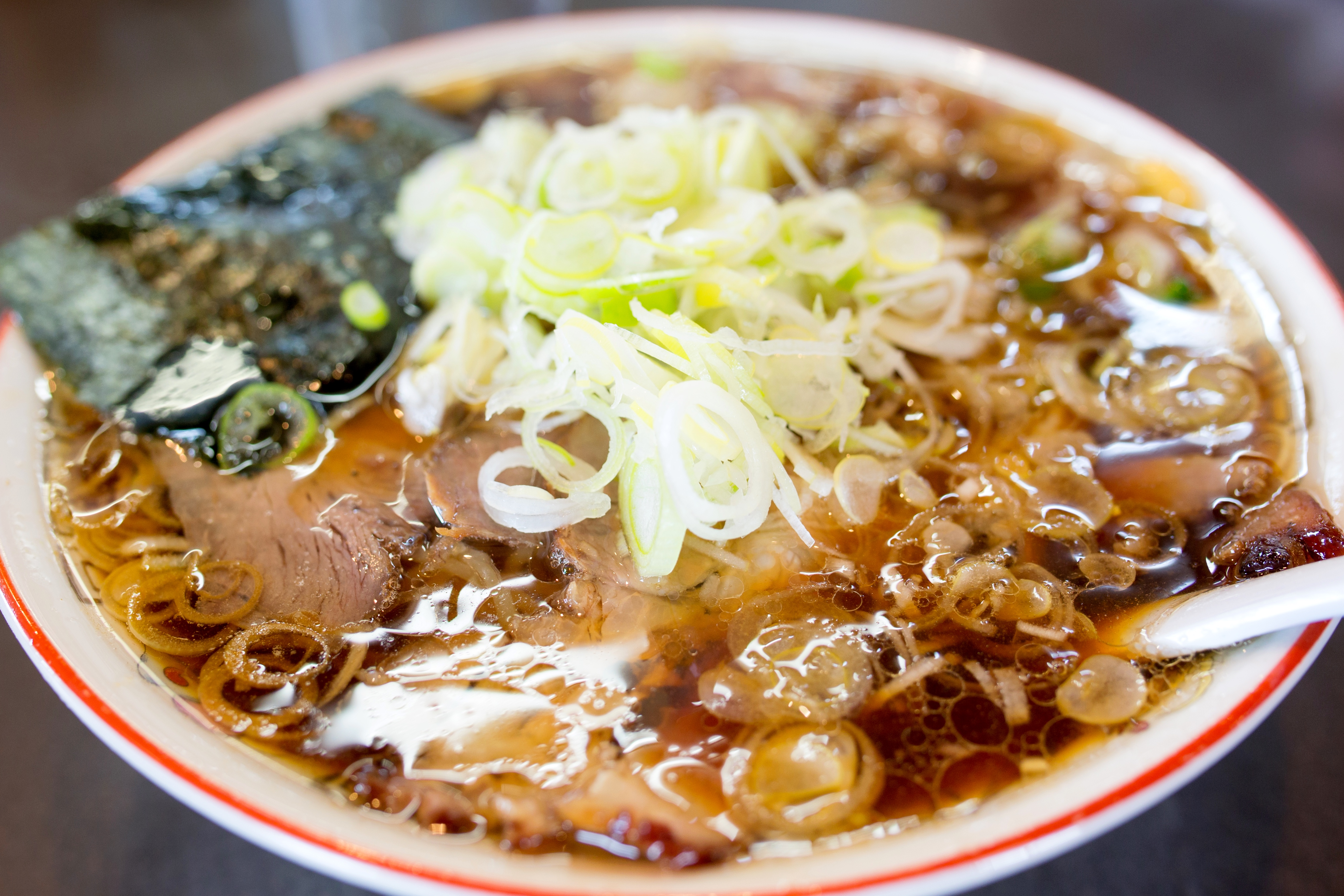
Nagaoka Ginger Ramen served at Aoshima Shokudo

== See also ==
- List of railway stations in Japan
