= Inuyama-Yūen Station =

Railway station in Inuyama, Aichi Prefecture, Japan

Inuyamayūen Station 犬山遊園駅

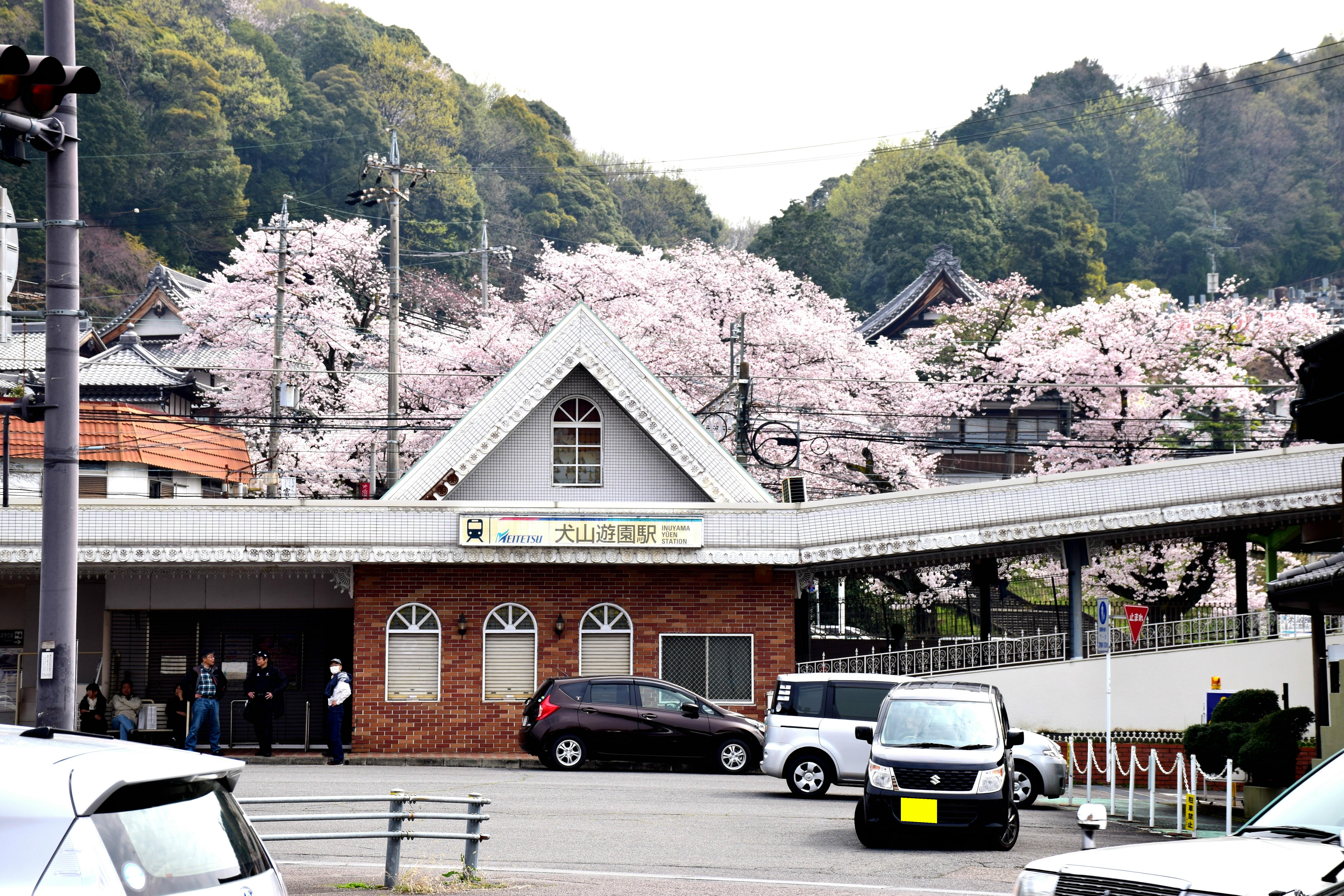
- Inuyamayūen Station in April 2016

General information
- Location: Zuisenji-24-1 Inuyama-shi, Aichi-ken 484-0081; Japan
- Coordinates: 35.3903°N 136.9469°E
- Operator: Meitetsu
- Line: ■ Meitetsu Inuyama Line
- Distance: 26.1 kilometers from Biwajima
- Platforms: 2 side platforms

Other information
- Status: Unstaffed
- Station code: IY16
- Website: Official website

History
- Opened: May 2, 1926
- Former names: Inuyamahashi (to 1949)

Passengers
- FY2015: 1613

Services
Preceding station	Meitetsu	Following station
Inuyama towards Central Japan International Airport	μSky	Shin-Unuma Terminus
Inuyama towards Shimo Otai	Inuyama Line Rapid Limited Express Limited Express Rapid Express Express Semi-Express Local	Shin-Unuma Terminus
Former services
Preceding station	Meitetsu	Following station
Terminus	Monkey Park Monorail Line	Naritasan towards Dōbutsuen
Location
- Location within Aichi Prefecture Location within Japan

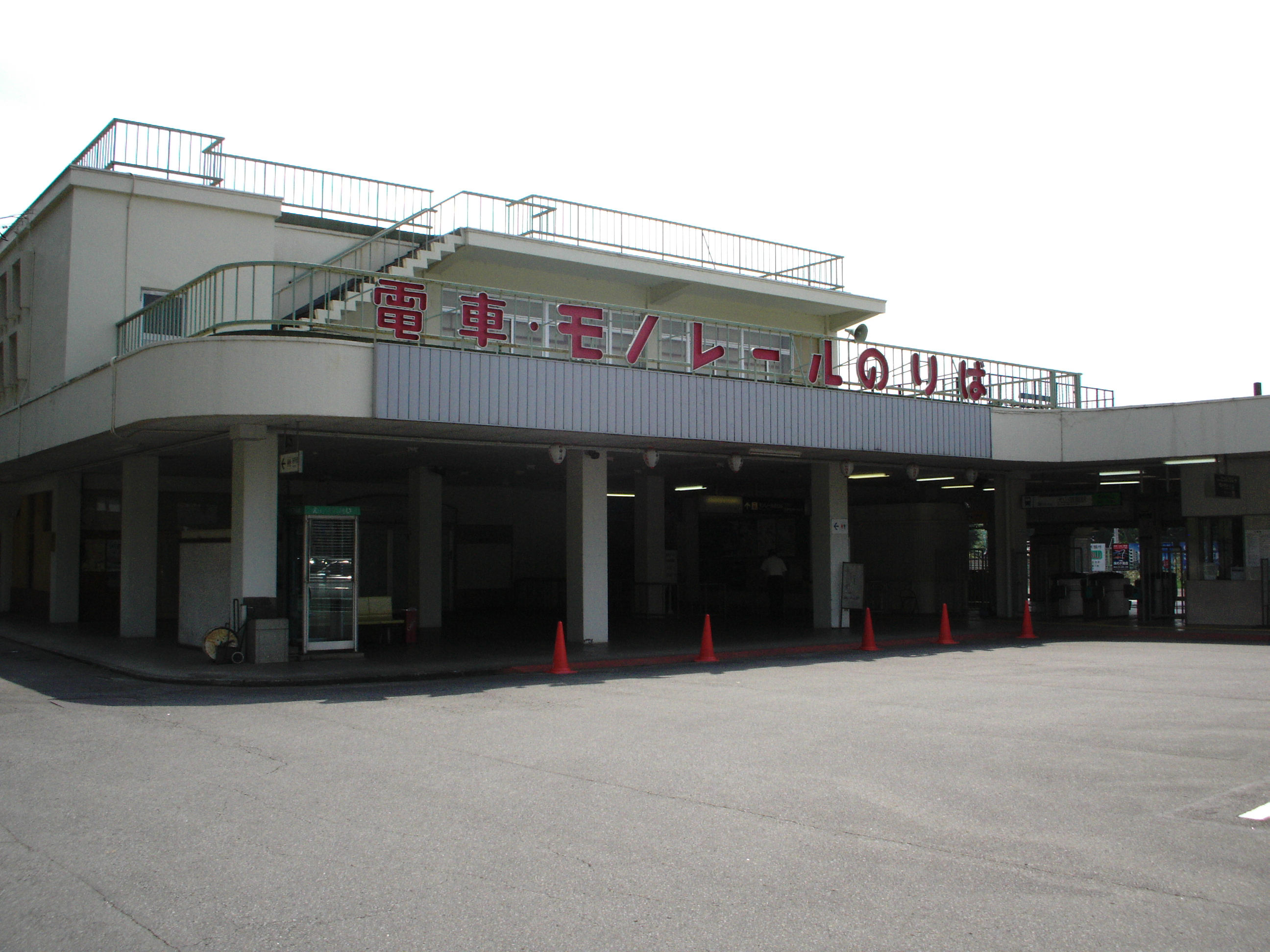
Monorail Line entrance (2006)

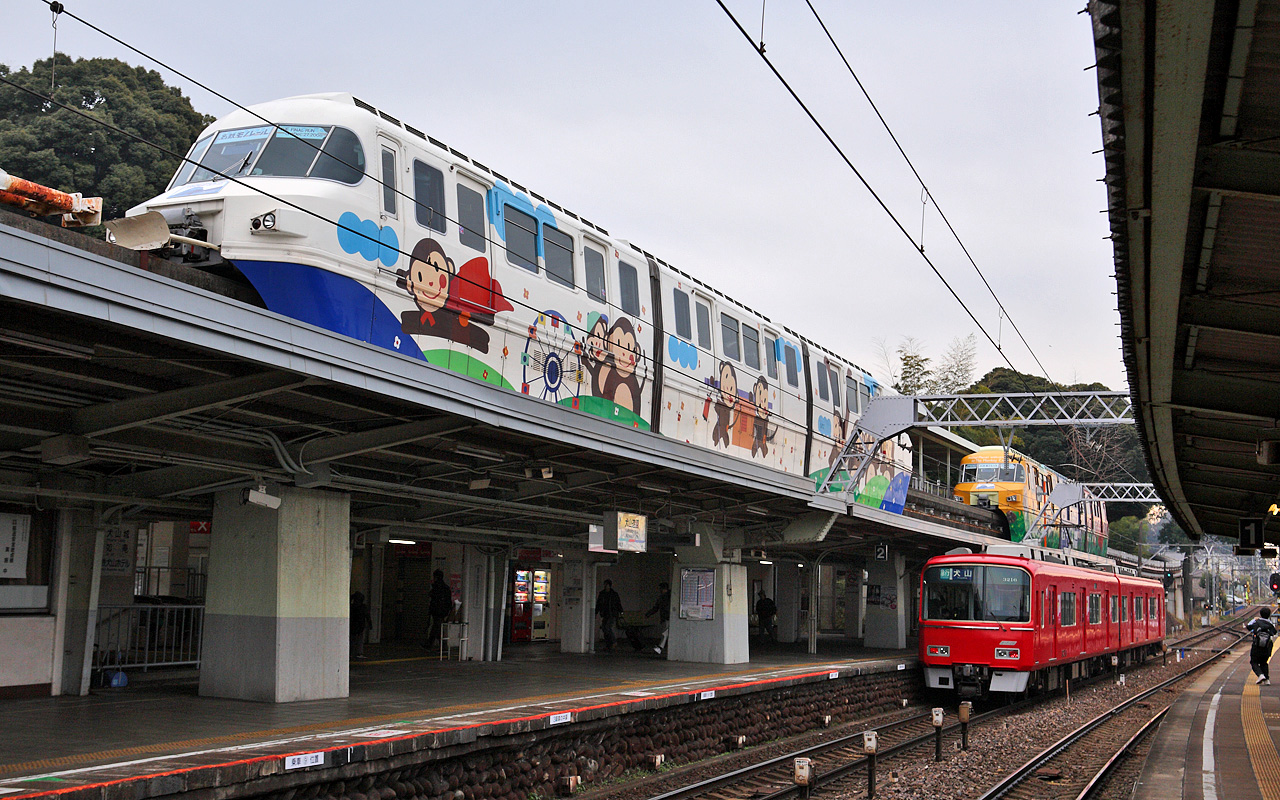
Monorail Line and Meitetsu platform

Inuyamayūen Station (犬山遊園駅, Inuyamayūen-eki) is a railway station in the city of Inuyama, Aichi Prefecture, Japan, operated by Meitetsu.

== Lines ==
Inuyamayūen Station is served by the Meitetsu Inuyama Line, and is located 26.1 kilometers from the starting point of the line at Biwajima.

== Station layout ==
The station has two opposed side platforms connected by a level crossing. The station is unattended and it has ticket machines and Manaca automated turnstiles.

=== Platforms ===
1	■ Inuyama Line	For Meitetsu-Gifu
2	■ Inuyama Line	For Inuyama and Meitetsu-Nagoya

== Station history ==
Inuyamayūen Station was opened on May 2, 1926 as Inuyamahashi Station (犬山橋駅, Inuyamahashi-eki). The station was closed in 1944 and reopened on April 5, 1949. It was renamed on December 1, 1949. A new station building was completed in 1962.

Until December 27, 2008, the station was also served by the Monkey Park Monorail Line. The monorail platform was on the roof of platform 2. The track has completely disappeared, except the terminus at Monkey Park. There is a piece of track and one vehicle.

== Passenger statistics ==
In fiscal 2015, the station was used by an average of 1613 passengers daily.

== Surrounding area ==
- Inuyama Castle
- Meitetsu Inuyama Hotel

== See also ==
- List of railway stations in Japan
