= Meitetsu Gifu Shinai Line =

Former street car line in Gifu, Japan

Gifu Shinai Line
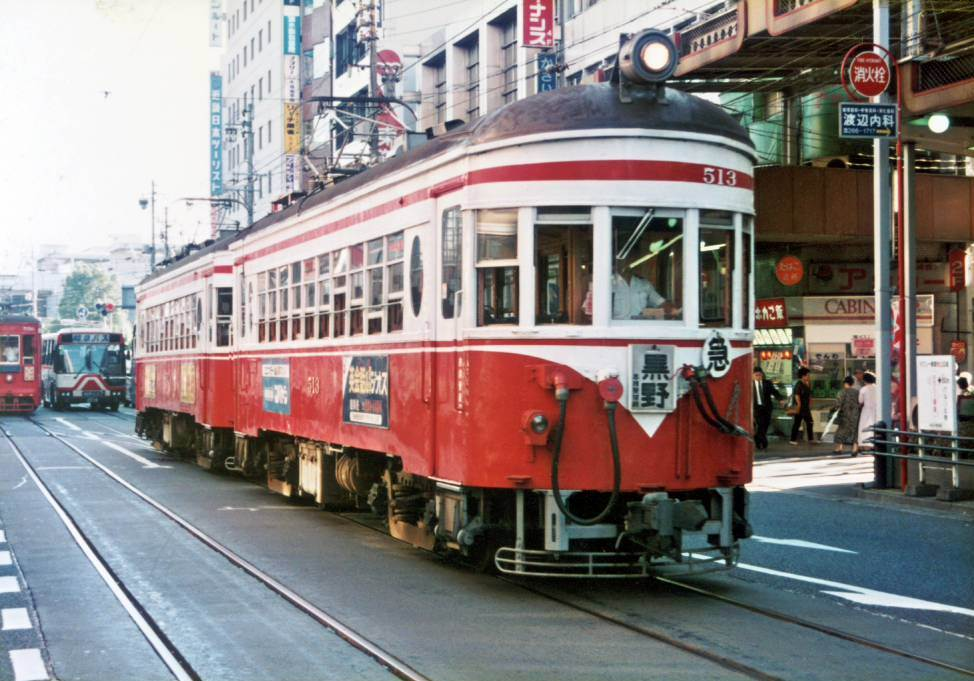
- A train stopping at Shin-Gifu-eki-mae station

Overview
- Other name: Nagara Line
- Native name: 岐阜市内線
- Status: Closed
- Termini: Nagarakitamachi (~1988) Chusetsu; Gifu-eki-mae
- Former connections: See stations list
- Stations: 20

Service
- Type: Tram (Street running train)
- Operator(s): Mino Electric Railways (~1930); Meitetsu (1930~2005)

History
- Opened: February 11, 1911
- Last extension: July 1, 1953
- Closed: April 1, 2005

Technical
- Track length: 7.6 km (4.7 mi)
- Electrification: 600 V overhead catenary

Meitetsu Gifu Shinai Line (Japanese: 名鉄岐阜市内線, Hepburn: Meitetsu Gifu Shinai-sen) was a 7.6 km long tram line which existed from 1911 and was operated by Meitetsu from 1930 to 2005. The line, nicknamed Nagara Line, connected Gifu-eki-mae Station with Nagarakitamachi Station. A branch line extended from Tetsumeicho to Chusetsu. Both lines ran through the city of Gifu in Japan.

== History ==
The Mino Electric Railways opened the first section from Gifu-eki-mae to Izumimachi (merged into Daigakubyoin-mae) on February 11, 1911. The kept extending in stages until it reached Nagara-Bashi in 1912 and Nagarakitamachi on November 20, 1915. The branch line to Chusetsu-Bashi (closed 1948) opened in June 1925, and extended to Chusetsu on July 1, 1953. The Mino Electric railways was merged into the Nagoya Railroad on August 20, 1930. During the World War II, a train depot on the line was attacked and bombed along with the city of Gifu on July 10, 1945, which resulted in the loss of 14 to 25 cars due to fire. The damage caused the line to lack trains post-war, although it was able to keep the line running by fixing damaged cars and moving cars from the Meitetsu Seto Line. The two bridges crossing the Nagara River were dismantled and rebuilt on August 1, 1948, allowing the previously mentioned extension of the line to Chusetsu. While the section beyond Inaba-dori was initially single-tracked, the tracks were all duplicated by March 31, 1957.

From 1955, streetcars around Japan began to be rapidly closed due to the spread of motorization. Gifu City passed a resolution to close the Gifu Shinai Line in 1967, but failed to actually close the line in this attempt due to financial disputes with Meitetsu. The city then attempted to convert the line to a monorail from 1970, but gave up in 1975 due to high costs. The main line was closed on June 1, 1988, to prevent road congestion in the Gifu Central Future Expo. The section from Gifu-eki-mae to Shin-Gifu-eki-mae were closed on December 1, 2003, to relocate the tracks, as the prefectural route 54 was being improved. This section never reopened as the entire line closed before the scheduled date of reopening.

Due to the poor performance of the line, Meitetsu expressed their intent to close the line in January 2003, along with the Meitetsu Ibi Line, Meitetsu Minomachi Line, and Meitetsu Tagami Line. Meitetsu claimed that only a few lines out of their network of 24 lines at the time were making positive revenues and automobiles were doing a better job at connecting central Gifu with the outskirts. Following this announcement, the city conducted a social experiment from October 27 to November 28, 2003, where cars were banned from going inside tracks in some sections, which total length was 2.1 km. Fences were placed around some stations to ensure safety. These changes did not have enough effect on ridership to stop Meitetsu from deciding the date of the closure of the Gifu Shinai Line on April 1, 2005.

== Operations ==
=== Service ===
Services on the line were frequently disrupted after the city decided to allow automobiles to pass through the tracks in 1967, causing delays. In some extreme cases, some services turned around at Shin-Gifu-eki-mae Station, resulting in Gifu-eki-mae Station not being serviced by trains at all depending on the season. Services on the Meitetsu Gifu Shinai Line provided through service for the Meitetsu Ibi Line. The services after December 2003 ran from 5 a.m. to 10 p.m., and used to run in a frequency from 5 to 15 minutes. Through services to Kurono via the Meitetsu Ibi Line ran every 15 minutes.

=== Ridership ===
Year	Passengers	Note
1956	14,712,078	
1960	27,325,683	The Takatomi Line closed in this year.
1961	21,087,752	
1962	28,139,568	
1990	2,102,689	Data from Heisei uses a different counting method.
1991	1,983,572	
1992	1,970,967	
1993	1,948,481	
1994	1,963,797	
1995	1,922,766	
1996	1,880,314	
1997	1,704,234	
1998	1,684,161	
1999	1,496,881	
2000	1,423,197	
2001	1,371,113	
2002	1,279,518	
2003	1,093,781	
2004	1,015,138	
2005	891,502	The rest of the line closed in 2005.

=== Stations list ===
Stations name column uses the name at the time of their closure.

Chusetsu branch line (~2005)

Station	Japanese	Opened	Closed	Connections	Notes
Gifu-eki-mae	岐阜駅前	February 11, 1911	April 1, 2005	JR Central - Tokaido Main Line and Takayama Main Line via Gifu Station	Relocated with the JGR Gifu station on February 8, 1913. Originally named "Ekimae" before April 18, 1948.
Shin-Gifu-eki-mae	新岐阜駅前	February 11, 1911	April 1, 2005	Kakamigahara Line and Nagoya Main Line via Meitetsu Gifu Station	Originally named "Nagazumicho". Relocated and renamed to Shin-Gifu-eki-mae on April 18, 1948.
Kimpocho	金宝町	February 11, 1911	April 1, 2005		Suspended in 1944, service resumed on October 30, 1955.
Tetsumeicho	徹明町	February 11, 1911	April 1, 2005	Minomachi Line (April 1, 1950~)	
Koganemachi	金町	June 1, 1925	April 1, 2005		Originally named "Takanocho". Suspended in 1944, service resumed and station renamed to Koganemachi on September 10, 1955.
Senjudo	千手堂	April 21, 1924	April 1, 2005	Kagashima Line	Originally opened as a part of Kagashima Line. Gifu Shinai Line reached the station on June 1, 1925.
Hongocho	本郷町	December 11, 1925	April 1, 2005		Was once merged into Sugawaracho Station for an unknown duration.
Sugawaracho	菅原町	December 11, 1925	1946		Hongocho and Nishinomachi Station were once merged into this station on an unknown date.
Nishinomachi	西野町	December 11, 1925	April 1, 2005		Was once merged into Sugawaracho Station for an unknown duration.
Chusetsubashi	忠節橋	December 11, 1925	April 15, 1968		Closed on August 1, 1948, but was revived and relocated on September 18, 1955.
Soden	早田	August 1, 1948	April 1, 2005		Originally named "Chusetsubashi" before December 21, 1954.
Chusetsu	忠節	July 1, 1953	April 1, 2005	Ibi Line	The Chusetsu Station served by the Ibi Line was merged into this station on December 21, 1954.

Main Line (~1988)

Station	Japanese	Opened	Closed	Connections	Notes
Tetsumeicho	徹明町	February 11, 1911	April 1, 2005	Minomachi Line (April 1, 1950~)	
Gifu Yanagase	岐阜柳ケ瀬	February 11, 1911	June 1, 1988	Minomachi Line (~April 1, 1950)	Originally named "Kandamachi", then renamed to "Minoden Yanagase" in the middle of the Taisho period. Renamed to Gifu Yanagase on January 1, 1931.
Yanagase	柳ケ瀬	Unknown	Unknown		Closed before April 1, 1942
Shiyakusho-Mae	市役所前	February 11, 1911	June 1, 1988		Formerly named Yatsuderacho when it opened, and renamed three times (Yubinkyokumae, Saibanjomae, Imazawacho) before finally being renamed to Shiyakusho-Mae on February 1, 1966.
Asahimachi	朝日町	February 11, 1911	1945		Merged into Shiyakusho-Mae
Imakomachi	今小町	February 11, 1911	1948		Merged into Daigakubyoin-Mae
Daigakubyoin-Mae	大学病院前	October 7, 1911	June 1, 1988		Originally named Izumimachi, renamed to Kenchoshiyakushomae after merging with Imakomachi in 1948. Renamed to Daigakubyoin-Mae on February 12, 1966.
Inaba-Dori	伊奈波通	October 7, 1911	June 1, 1988		
Yajimacho	矢島町	October 7, 1911	1948		Merged with Hommachi
Hommachi	本町	October 7, 1911	June 1, 1988		
Zaimokucho	材木町	1948	June 1, 1988		
Koen-Mae	公園前	August 28, 1912	June 1, 1988		
Nagara-Bashi	長良橋	August 28, 1912	June 1, 1988		
Ukaiya	鵜飼屋	November 20, 1915	June 1, 1988		Service suspended in 1944, resumed on May 11, 1948
Nagarakitamachi	長良北町	December 15, 1913	June 1, 1988	Takatomi Line	

== Route ==
The southern terminus of the line was the Gifu-eki-mae Station, which as the name suggests in Japanese, was located right in front of Gifu Station. The line then continues to Shin-Gifu-eki-mae Station located nearby Meitetsu Gifu Station, which was called Shin-Gifu Station at the time. After leaving Shin-Gifu-eki-mae, the line ran through the Nagarabashi-dori, a narrow road with high traffic. A branch line branched off from Tetsumeicho Station to Chusetsu Station, while the line, nicknamed the Nagara Line from this point continued further north, passing by the city office of Gifu. Four consecutive 90 degrees curves followed after Inaba-Dori Station. The line then headed north again, crossing the Nagara River between Nagara-Bashi Station and Unukaiya Station. The rest of the line headed straight north to Nagarakitamachi Station the northern terminus, which connected to the Meitetsu Takatomi Line.

The branch line branched off towards the west, running through the Tetsumei-dori and heading towards Senjudo Station, which connected to the Meitetsu Kagashima Line. After Senjudo, the line turned right towards the north. The branch line crosses the Nagara River between Nishinomachi Station and Souden Station. The line turned left after crossing the river and continued towards Chusetsu Station, the terminus of the branch line.
