= Monkey Park Monorail Line =

Former monorail line in Aichi Prefecture, Japan

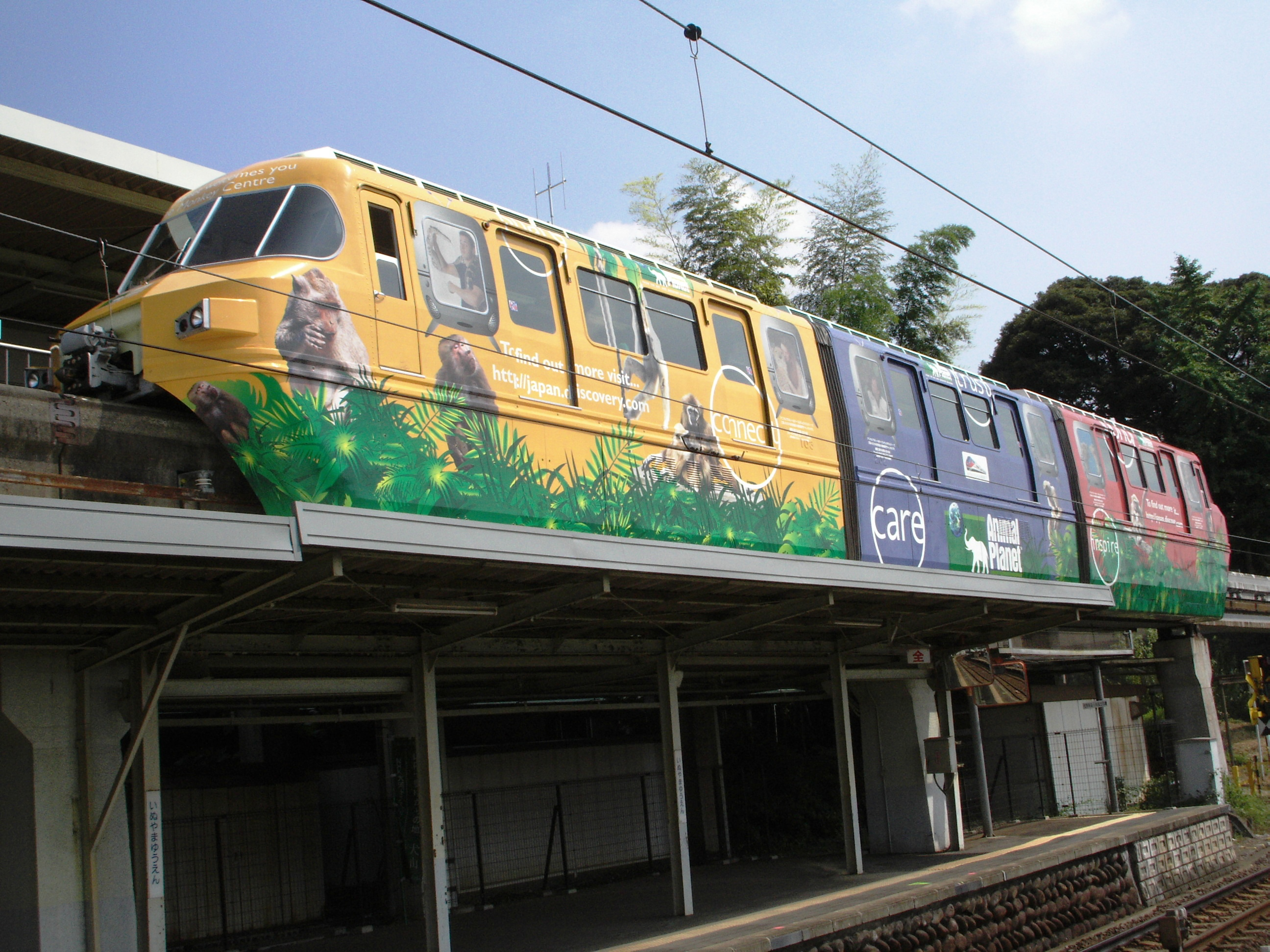

Overview
- Locale: Inuyama, Aichi
- Stations: 3

Service
- Type: straddle-beam Monorail
- Operator(s): Nagoya Railroad

History
- Opened: 21 March 1962
- Closed: 27 December 2008

Technical
- Line length: 1.2 km
- Electrification: 1,500 V DC
- Operating speed: 30 km/h

The Meitetsu Monkey Park Monorail Line (名鉄モンキーパークモノレール線, Meitetsu Monkī Pāku Monorēru-sen) was a monorail in Inuyama, Aichi that connected the Japan Monkey Park to Inuyama-yūen Station, operated by Nagoya Railroad (Meitetsu). The line featured steep sections, including one 9.7% grade, and traveled through an artificial canyon for a section. The trip took about four minutes.

== History ==
The Monkey Park Monorail Line opened on 21 March 1962, and was the first Hitachi Monorail using the ALWEG track standard.

The line was closed on 27 December 2008 following Meitetsu's decision based on its small ridership and aging facilities. In 2006, ridership averaged only 645 passengers per day.

== Trains ==
The line had two trains with three cars each, which could be coupled together for higher capacity. The trains operated on a 1,500 V DC power supply, and had a top speed of 35 km/h.

Two monorail cars, end car 101 and intermediate car 201, are scheduled to be preserved next to the former Dōbutsuen Station in their original livery of silver with red and white bodyside stripes from 19 March 2009. Additionally, a single car from the defunct line is currently on display at the Spa Resort Yunohana. Visitors can tour the inside and outside of the monorail car, which briefly became a location for a Japanese geocaching adventure game in Kani-city. Former station Dobutsuen is the only surviving building of the line, with a piece of track and one vehicle. The rest of the line has been completely dismantled.

The Meitetsu train is also featured in the Japanese train simulation video game, Densha de Go! Nagoya Railroad, along with several other Meitetsu trains.

== Stations ==
- Dōbutsuen Station (Japan Monkey Park)
- Naritasan Station
- Inuyama-yūen Station

== See also ==
- Monorails in Japan
