= Makurazaki Line =

Nansatsu Railway Makurazaki Line
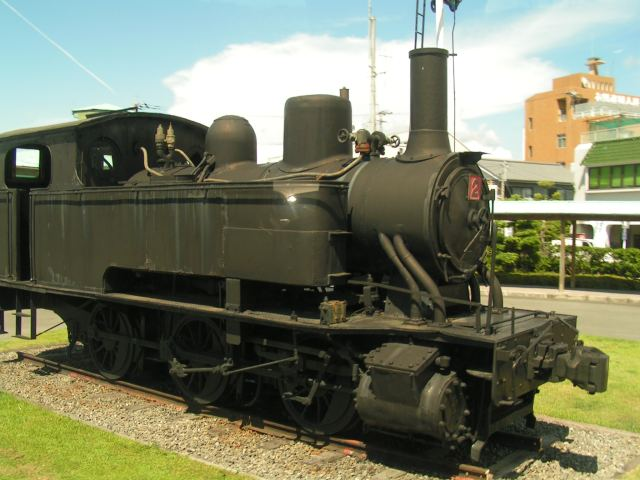
- Nansatsu Railway Locomotive No. 2 (Kaseda Bus Terminal)

Overview
- Native name: 南薩鉄道枕崎線
- Status: Closed
- Owner: Nansatsu Railway
- Termini: Ijūin; Makurazaki
- Stations: 23

Service
- Type: Regional rail
- Rolling stock: Kiha 100, Kiha 300, DD1200

History
- Opened: 1 April 1914 (Ijūin to Izaku); 10 May 1914 (Izaku to Kaseda); 10 March 1931 (Kaseda to Makurazaki)
- Closed: 18 March 1984

Technical
- Line length: 49.6 km (30.8 mi)
- Track gauge: 3 ft 6 in (1,067 mm)
- Electrification: None

The Makurazaki Line (枕崎線, Makurazaki-sen) was a railway line operated by Nansatsu Railway (南薩鉄道, Nansatsu Tetsudō). It ran between Ijūin Station and Makurazaki Station in Kagoshima Prefecture, Japan.

== History ==
On 12 April 1912, Nansatsu Railway was granted a permit to construct and operate a steam-operated railway line between Naka-Ijūin Village, Hioki District and Makurazaki, Kawabe District in Kagoshima Prefecture, with capital funds of one million yen.

The line partially opened between Ijūin and Izaku on 1 April 1914 and was extended to Kaseda on 10 May the same year. The construction of the line to Makurazaki, however, encountered delays and its permit was revoked on 26 February 1925. The line was finally completed and opened on 10 March 1931, almost 19 years after initial planning.

The line was known for being Kagoshima Prefecture's only private railway line, and the southernmost private line in Japan after the closure of all Okinawan lines. After World War II, through service with the Japanese National Railways (JNR) to Kagoshima commenced in 1949, and diesel trains were introduced in 1952. The 1950s were said to be the Makurazaki Line's heyday, and it played an important role in transportation across the Satsuma Peninsula.

However, passenger numbers started to gradually decrease through the 1960s, due to motorization, the completion of main roads, and a dwindling population along the route. Two branch lines, the Bansei and Chiran Lines, were closed in 1962 and 1965 respectively, due to infeasibility of repairs after a flood damaged the tracks. In 1964, Nansatsu Railway (the company itself) merged with Sanshū Bus (三州自動車) to form Kagoshima Kōtsū, running bus operations to supplement the company's income.

Freight operations ceased on 1 April 1971, but passenger services continued while the line continued to battle dwindling passenger numbers. On 13 December 1982, Kagoshima Kōtsū finally gave notice of their intention to cease operations on the Makurazaki Line. However, before the line could formally close, a flood on 21 June 1983 severely damaged much of the line. Although operations along the short section between Hioki and Kaseda were reopened on 1 July the same year, the rest of the line stayed closed until the official abandonment of the whole line on 18 March 1984.
