= Raikōji Station =

Railway station in Nagaoka, Niigata Prefecture, Japan

Raikōji Station 来迎寺駅
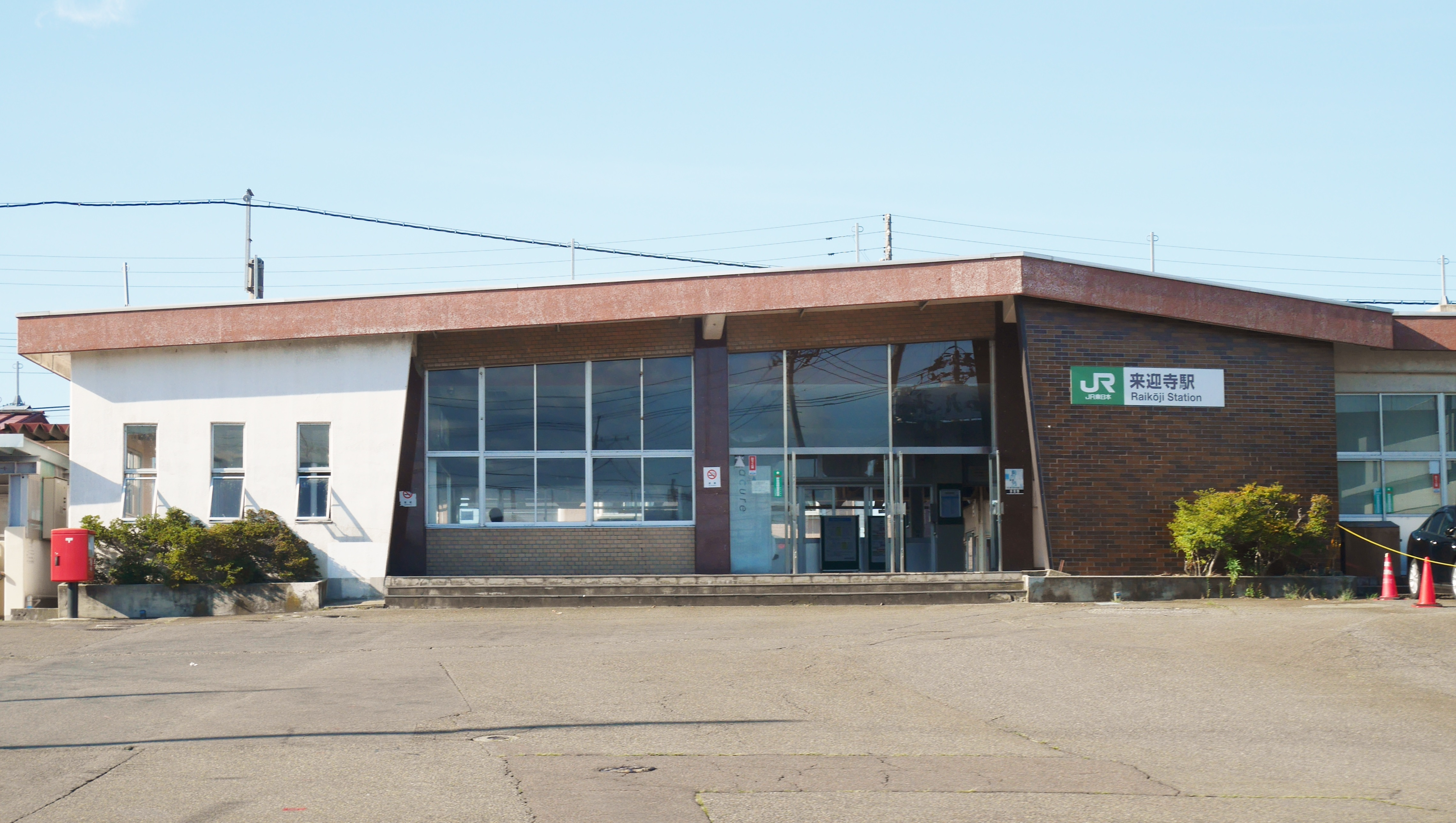
- Raikōji Station, August 2015

General information
- Location: 2727-3 Raikōji, Nagaoka-shi, Niigata-ken 949-5411; Japan
- Coordinates: 37°23′49.85″N 138°47′0.61″E
- Operator: JR East
- Line: ■ Shin'etsu Main Line
- Platforms: 2 side platforms
- Tracks: 2

Other information
- Status: Unstaffed
- Website: Official website

History
- Opened: 27 December 1898; 127 years ago

Passengers
- 556 daily (FY2017)

Services
Preceding station	JR East	Following station
Kashiwazaki towards Naoetsu	Shin'etsu Main Line Rapid	Miyauchi towards Niigata
Echigo-Iwatsuka towards Naoetsu	Shin'etsu Main Line Local	Maekawa towards Niigata
Location
- Location within JR Shinetsu Main Line Location within Japan

Raikōji Station (来迎寺駅, Raikōji-eki) is a railway station in the city of Nagaoka, Niigata, Japan, operated by the East Japan Railway Company (JR East).

== Lines ==
Raikōji Station is served by the Shin'etsu Main Line and is 63.6 kilometers from the terminus of the line at Naoetsu Station.

== Station layout ==
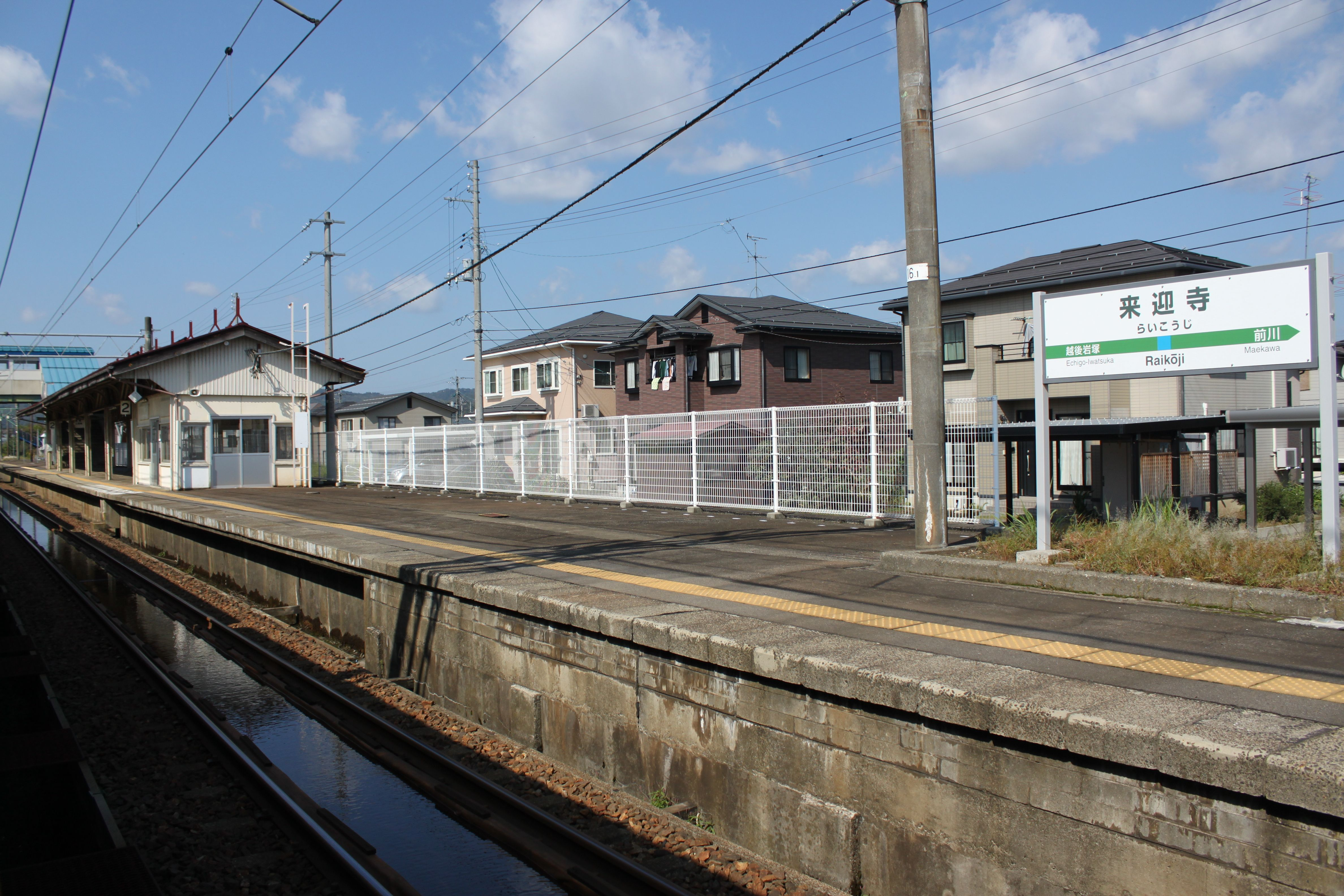
Platform (December 2011)

The station consists of two ground-level opposed side platforms connected by a footbridge, serving two tracks.

=== Platforms ===
1	■ Shin'etsu Main Line	for Kashiwazaki, Naoetsu
2	■ Shin'etsu Main Line	for Nagaoka, Niigata

== History ==
Raikōji Station opened on 27 December 1898. The present station building was completed in November 1979. The station was also served by the now-defunct Uonuma Line from 1911–1984, and the Nagaoka Line from 1921–1995. With the privatization of Japanese National Railways (JNR) on 1 April 1987, the station came under the control of JR East.

== Passenger statistics ==
In fiscal 2017, the station was used by an average of 556 passengers daily (boarding passengers only).

== Surrounding area ==
- Raikōji Post Office
- Koshiji Middle School
- Koshiji Elementary School

== See also ==
- List of railway stations in Japan
