= Echigo-Nagasawa Station =

Former railway station in Sanjō, Niigata Prefecture, Japan

Echigo-Nagasawa Station 越後長沢駅
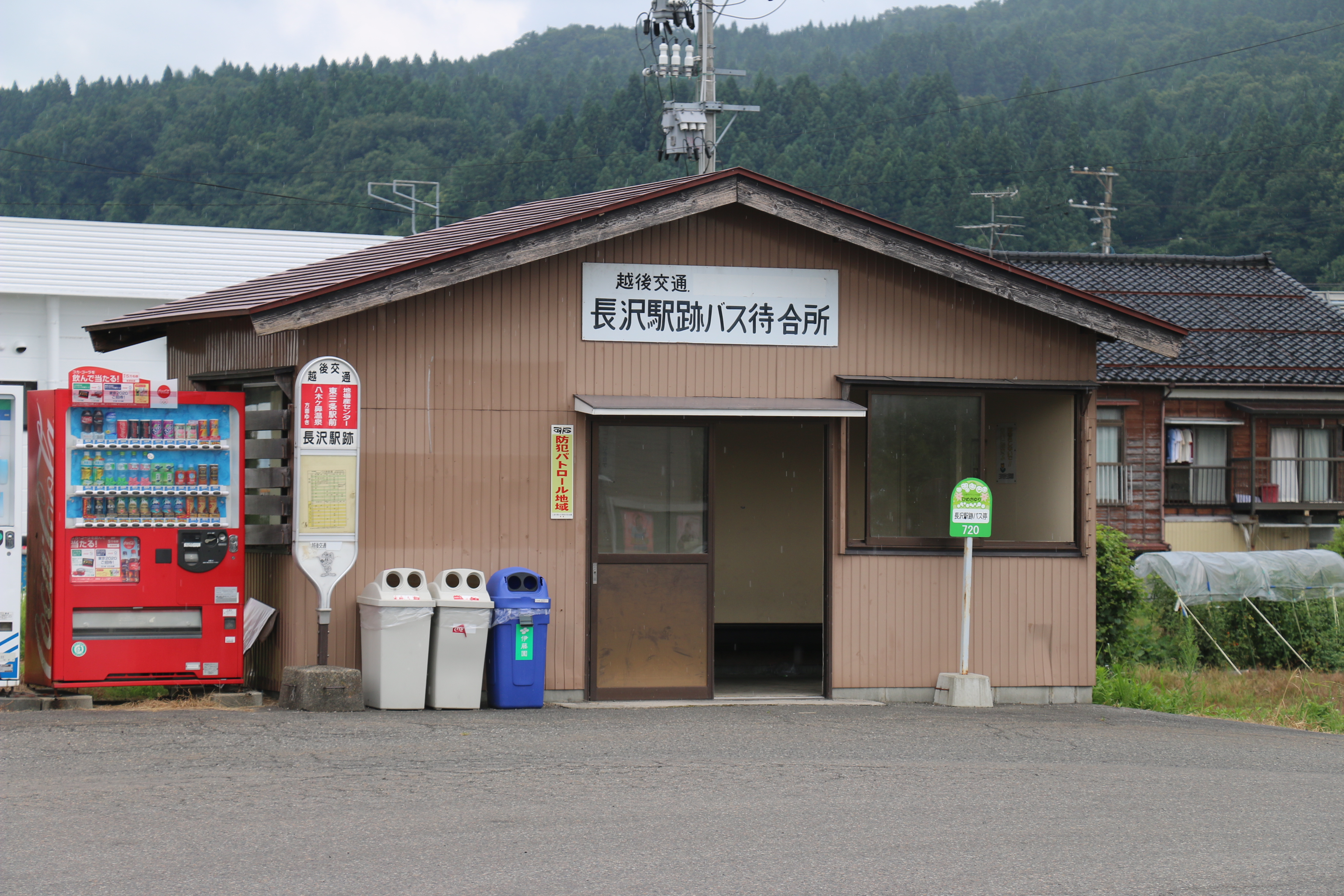
- The site of the station in August 2016

General information
- Location: Ogibori, Sanjō, Niigata （三条市荻堀） Japan
- Coordinates: 37°34′39″N 139°01′42″E
- Operator: Japanese National Railways
- Line: Yahiko Line
- Distance: 25.3 km from Yahiko
- Platforms: 1 side platform
- Tracks: 1

History
- Opened: 25 July 1927
- Closed: 1 April 1985

Passengers
- FY1981: 390 daily

Former services
Preceding station	JNR	Following station
Ōura towards Yahiko	Yahiko Line	Terminus
Location
- Location within JR Yahiko Line Location within Japan

Echigo-Nagasawa Station (越後長沢駅, Echigo-Nagasawa-eki) was a train station located in Sanjō, Niigata, Japan.

== Lines ==
- Japanese National Railways
  - Yahiko Line (Closed section)

== History ==
The station was opened on July 25, 1927 and closed on April 1, 1985.
