= Yoneyama Station =

Railway station in Kashiwazaki, Niigata Prefecture, Japan

Yoneyama Station 米山駅
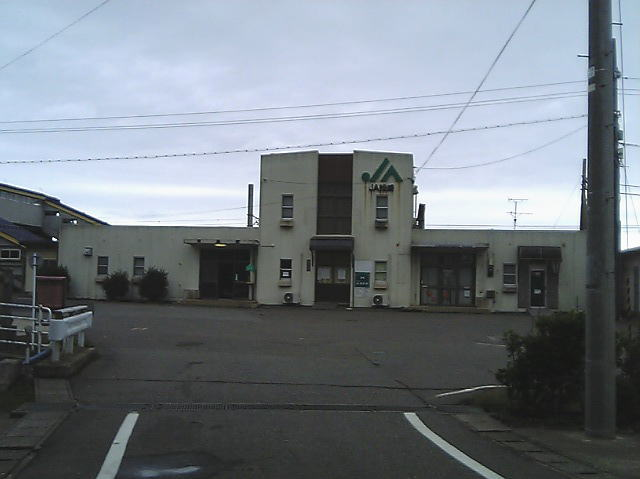
- Yoneyama Station, April 2006

General information
- Location: 302 Yoneyama-cho, Kashiwazaki-shi, Niigata-ken 949-3675; Japan
- Coordinates: 37.3170°N 138.4314°E
- Operator: JR East
- Line: ■ Shin'etsu Main Line
- Distance: 23.5 km to Naoetsu
- Platforms: 2 side platforms

Other information
- Status: Unstaffed
- Website: Official website

History
- Opened: 13 May 1897; 129 years ago
- Former names: Hassaki Station (to 1961)

Passengers
- 34 (FY2010)

Services
Preceding station	JR East	Following station
Kakizaki towards Naoetsu	Shin'etsu Main Line Local	Kasashima towards Niigata
Location
- Location within JR Shinetsu Main Line Location within Japan

Yoneyama Station (米山駅, Yoneyama-eki) is a railway station in the city of Kashiwazaki, Niigata, Japan, operated by East Japan Railway Company (JR East).

== Lines ==
Yoneyama Station is served by the Shin'etsu Main Line and is 23.5 kilometers from the terminus of the line at Naoetsu.

== Station layout ==
The station consists of two unnumbered ground-level opposed side platforms connected by a footbridge, serving two tracks. The station is unattended, but doubles as the local office of the Japan Agricultural Cooperatives (JA).

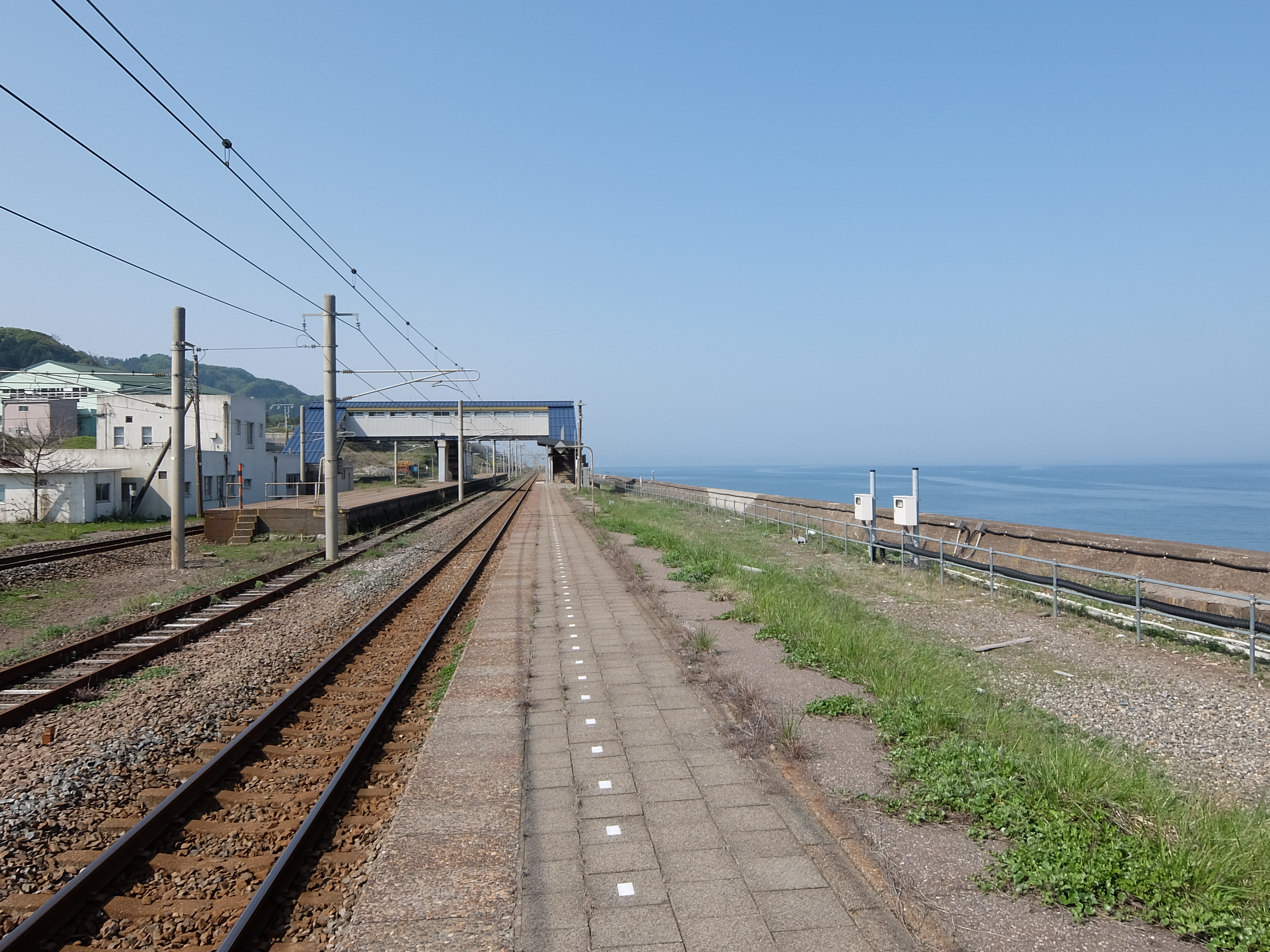
Platforms (May 2015)

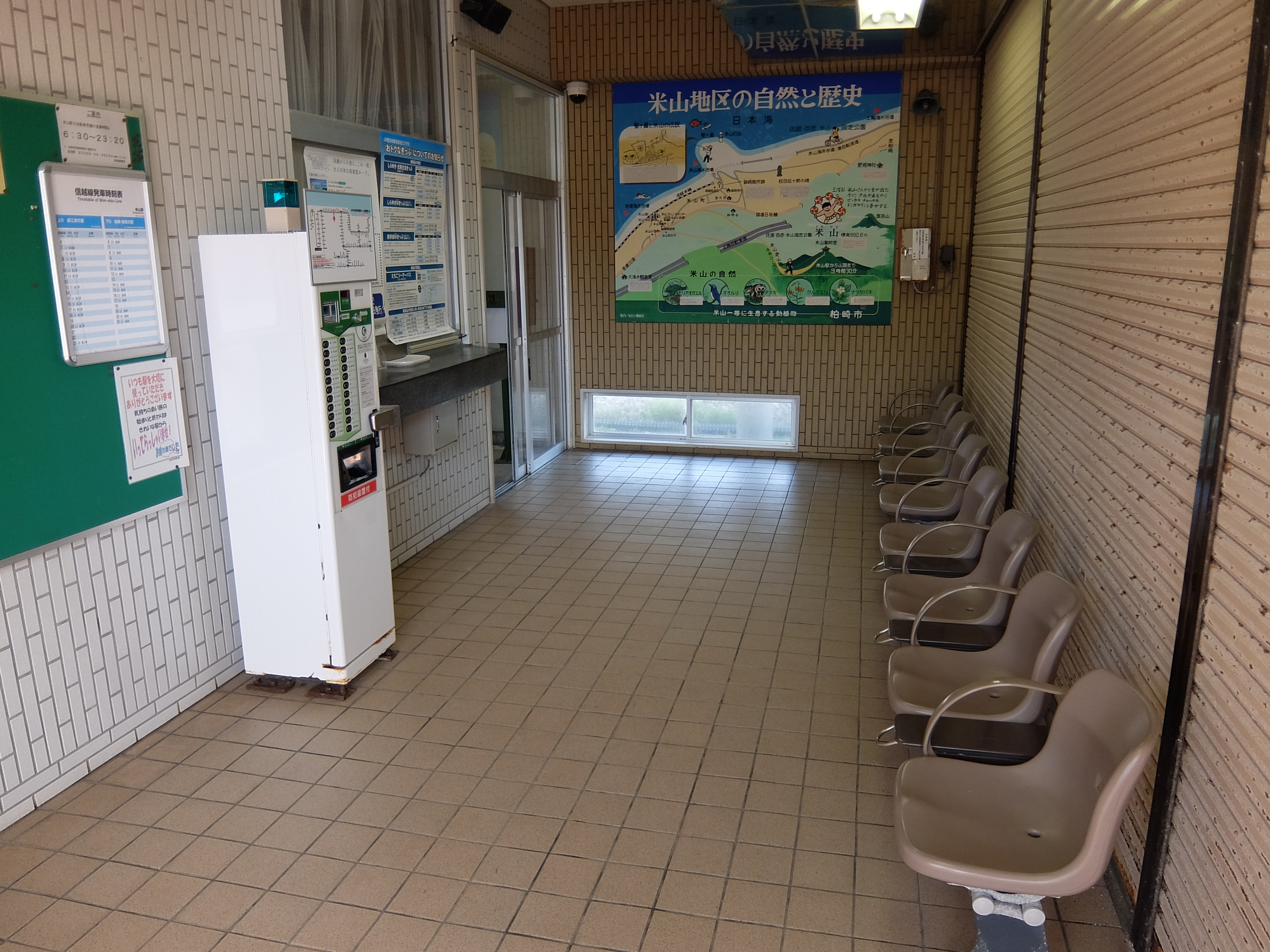
Waiting room (May 2015)

=== Platforms ===
south	■ Shin'etsu Main Line	for Naoetsu
north	■ Shin'etsu Main Line	for Kashiwazaki

== History ==
Yoneyama Station opened on 13 May 1897 as Hassaki Station (鉢崎駅). The station was renamed to its present name on 20 March 1961. With the privatization of Japanese National Railways (JNR) on 1 April 1987, the station came under the control of JR East.

== Surrounding area ==
- Yoneyama Swimming Beach
- Hassaki Post Office
- National Route 8

== See also ==
- List of railway stations in Japan
