= Ōmigawa Station =

Railway station in Kashiwazaki, Niigata Prefecture, Japan

Ōmigawa Station 青海川駅
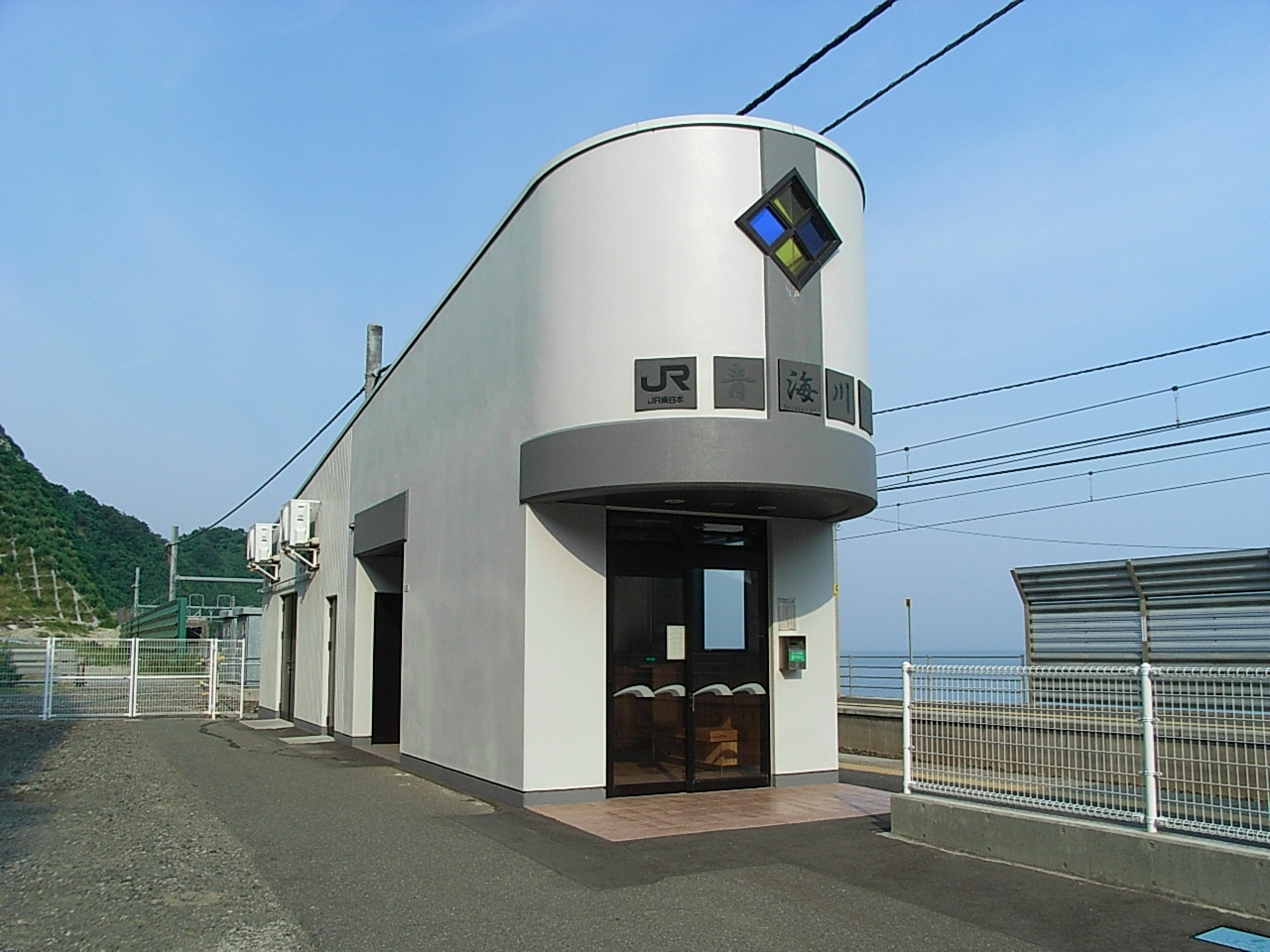
- Ōmigawa Station in June 2009

General information
- Location: Ōmigawa, Kashiwazaki-shi, Niigata-ken 949-3661; Japan
- Coordinates: 37.3463°N 138.4864°E
- Operator: JR East
- Line: ■ Shin'etsu Main Line
- Distance: 29.6 km to Naoetsu
- Platforms: 2 side platforms
- Tracks: 2

Other information
- Status: Unstaffed
- Website: Official website

History
- Opened: 28 July 1899; 127 years ago

Services
Preceding station	JR East	Following station
Kasashima towards Naoetsu	Shin'etsu Main Line Local	Kujiranami towards Niigata
Location
- Location within JR Shinetsu Main Line Location within Japan

Ōmigawa Station (青海川駅, Ōmigawa-eki) is a railway station on the Shinetsu Main Line in the city of Kashiwazaki, Niigata Prefecture, Japan, operated by East Japan Railway Company (JR East).

== Lines ==
Ōmigawa Station is served by the Shinetsu Main Line, and is 29.6 kilometers from the terminus of the line at Naoetsu.

== Layout ==
The station is unstaffed and consists of two opposed side platforms connected by a footbridge.

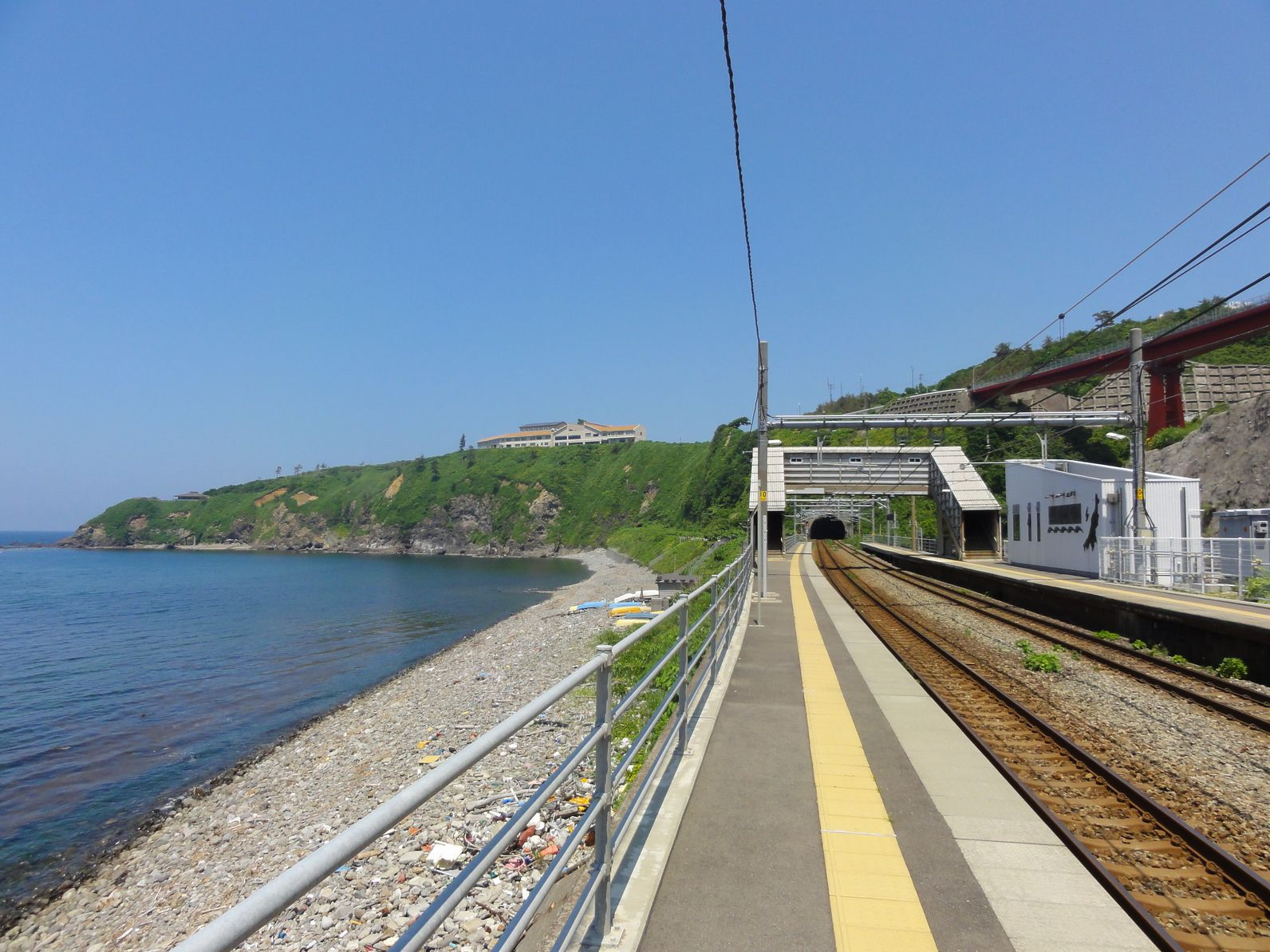
Platforms

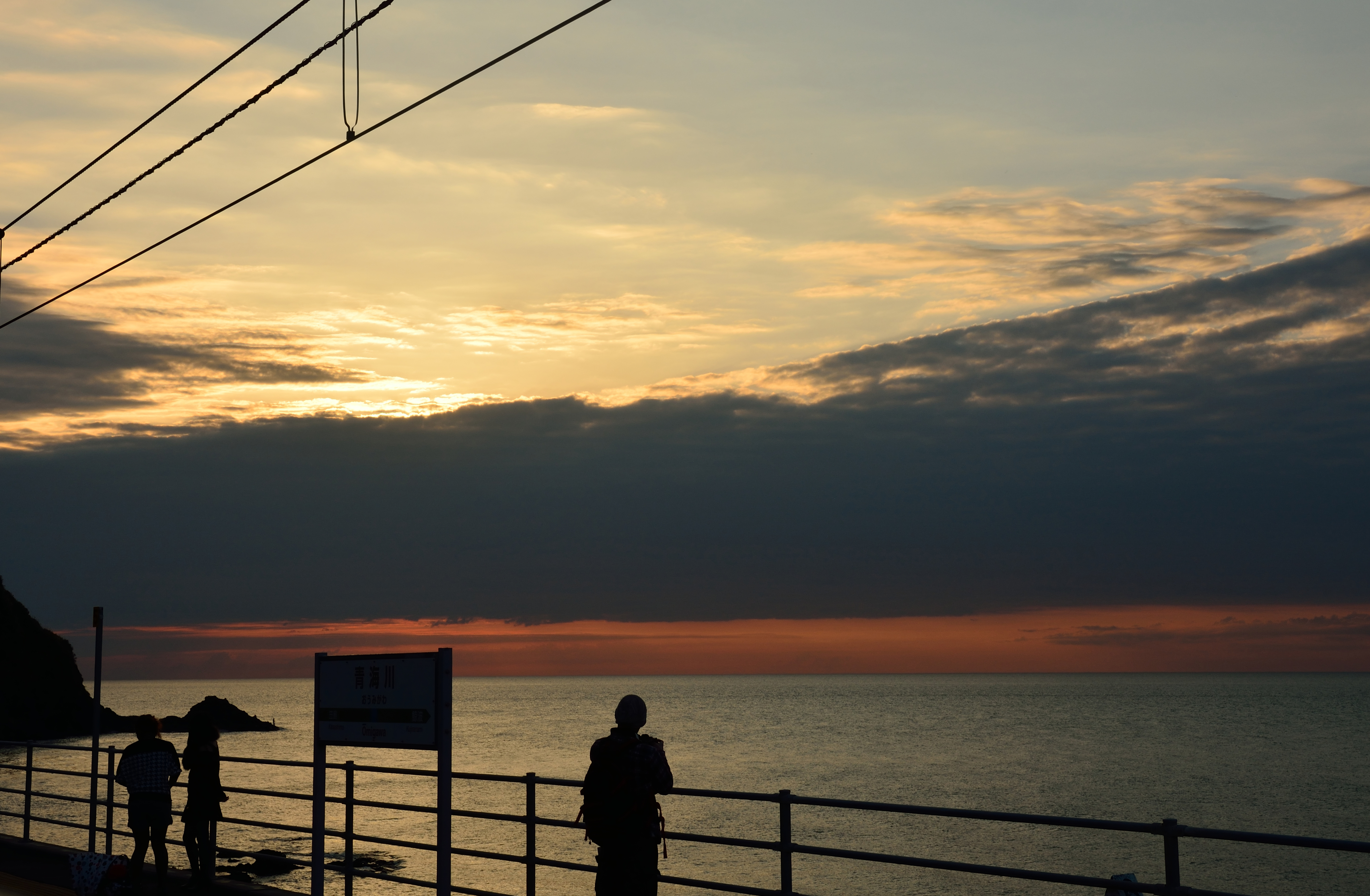
The view from train

=== Platforms ===
south	■ Shin'etsu Main Line	for Naoetsu
north	■ Shin'etsu Main Line	for Kashiwazaki and Nagaoka

== History ==
The station was opened on 28 July 1899. With the privatization of Japanese National Railways (JNR) on 1 April 1987, the station came under the control of JR East.

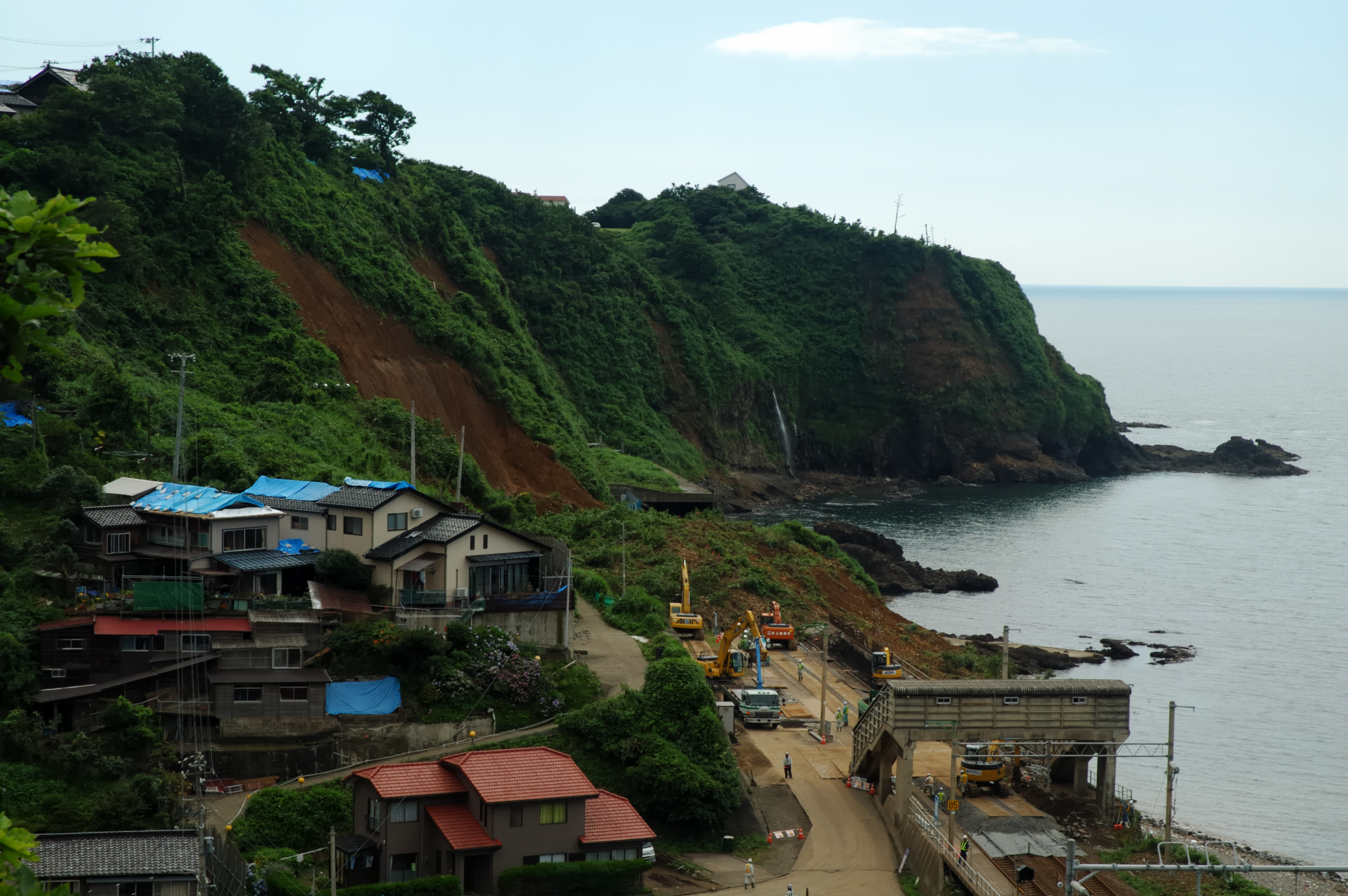
Station and track blocked by landslide, July 2007

On 17 July 2007, the station and line was damaged and blocked by a landslide caused by the 2007 Chūetsu offshore earthquake. The line reopened to traffic on 13 September 2007. A new station building was completed on 25 March 2008.

== Surrounding area ==
- Ōmigawa Swimming Beach

== See also ==
- List of railway stations in Japan
