= Kakizaki Station =

Railway station in Jōetsu, Niigata Prefecture, Japan

Kakizaki Station 柿崎駅
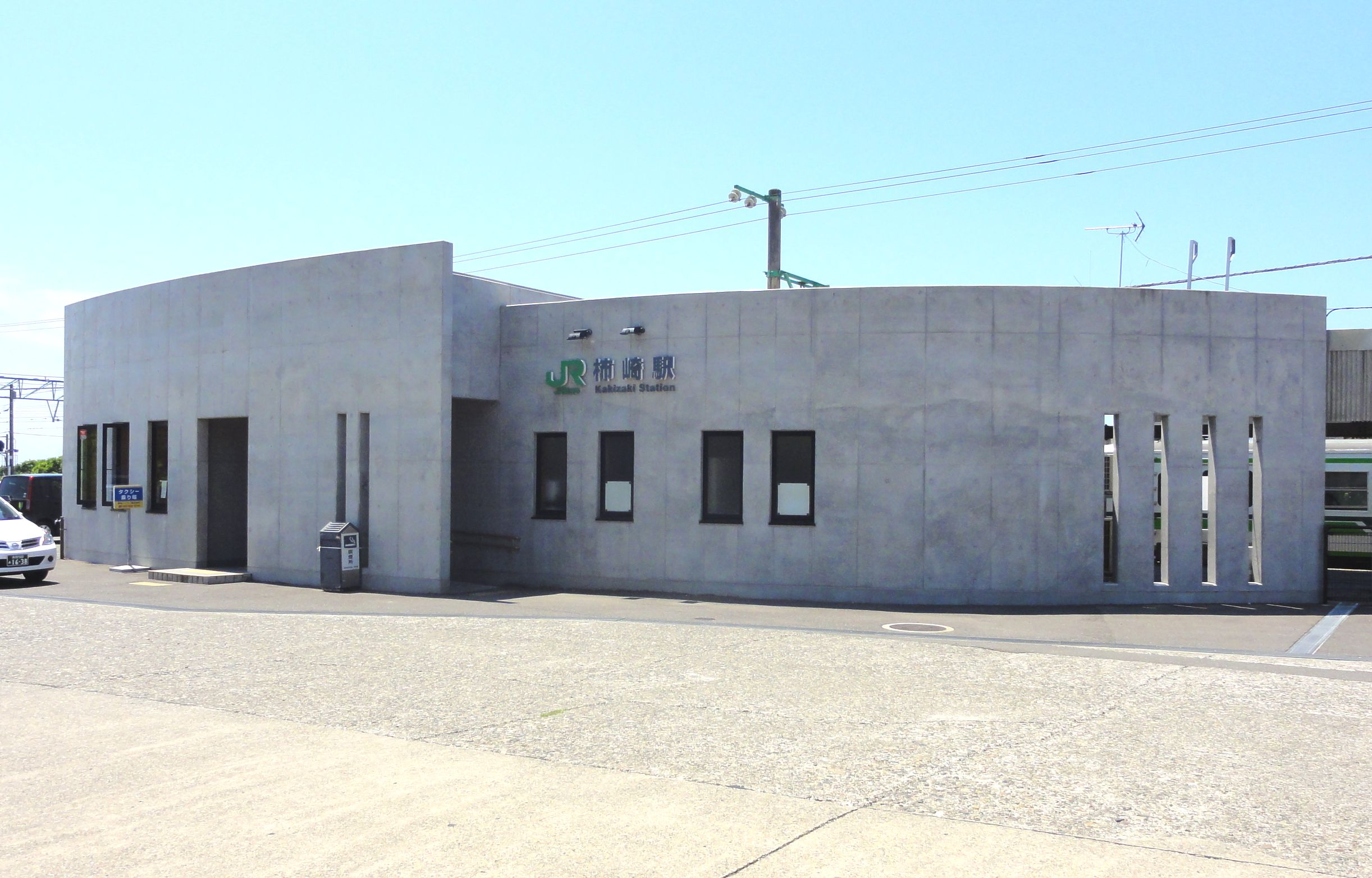
- Kakizaki Station in June 2011

General information
- Location: 6139-2 Kakizaki, Kakizaki-ku, Jōetsu-shi, Niigata-ken 949-3216; Japan
- Coordinates: 37.2779°N 138.3860°E
- Operator: JR East
- Line: ■ Shin'etsu Main Line
- Platforms: 1 side + 1 island platforms
- Tracks: 3

Other information
- Status: Unstaffed
- Website: Official website

History
- Opened: 13 May 1897; 129 years ago

Passengers
- 525 daily (FY2017)

Services
Preceding station	JR East	Following station
Naoetsu Terminus	Shirayuki	Kashiwazaki towards Niigata
Saigata towards Naoetsu	Shin'etsu Main Line Rapid	Kashiwazaki towards Niigata
Jōgehama towards Naoetsu	Shin'etsu Main Line Local	Yoneyama towards Niigata
Location
- Location within JR Shinetsu Main Line Location within Japan

Kakizaki Station (柿崎駅, Kakizaki-eki) is a railway station on the Shin'etsu Main Line in the city of Jōetsu, Niigata, Japan, operated by East Japan Railway Company (JR East).

== Lines ==
Kakizaki Station is served by the Shin'etsu Main Line, and is 17.6 kilometers from the terminus of the line at Naoetsu Station.

== Station layout ==
The station consists of one side platform adjacent to the station building, connected to an island platform by a footbridge. The station is unattended.

=== Platforms ===
1	■ Shin'etsu Main Line	for Naoetsu
2	■ Shin'etsu Main Line	for Naoetsu (starting trains) for Nagaoka (for local trains)
3	■ Shin'etsu Main Line	for Nagaoka and Niigata

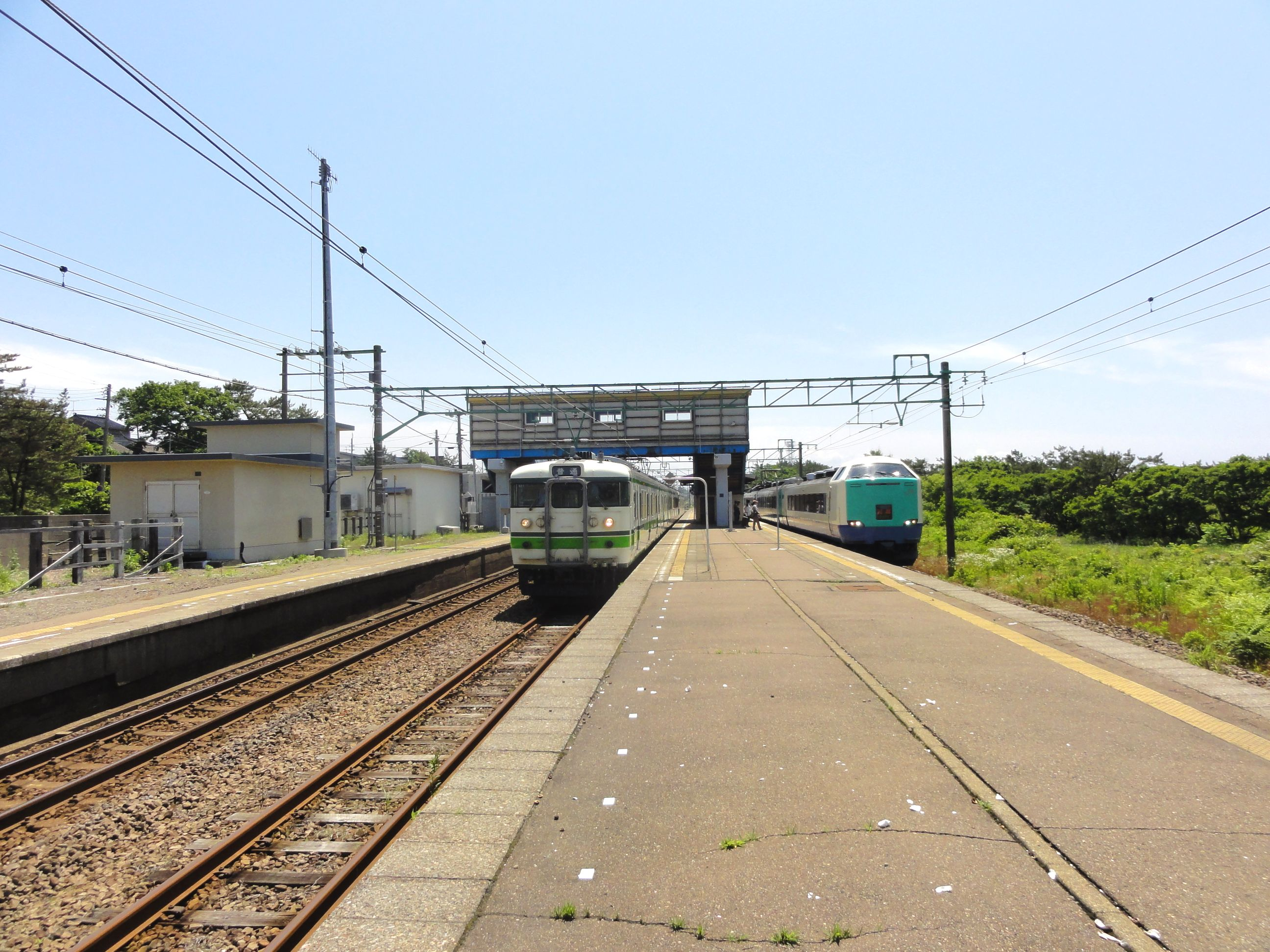
The station platforms in June 2011

== History ==
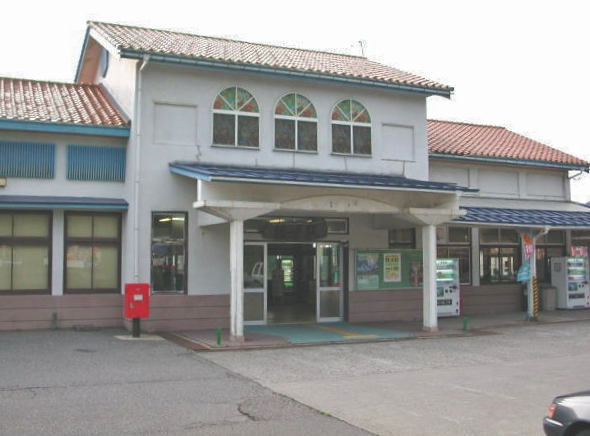
The station building in July 2004, before rebuilding

The station opened on 13 May 1897. With the privatization of Japanese National Railways (JNR) on 1 April 1987, the station came under the control of JR East.

== Passenger statistics ==
In fiscal 2017, the station was used by an average of 525 passengers daily (boarding passengers only).

== Surrounding area ==
- Kakizaki Post Office
- National Route 8

== See also ==
- List of railway stations in Japan
