= Katamachi Station =

Railway station in Jōetsu, Niigata Prefecture, Japan

Katamachi Station 潟町駅
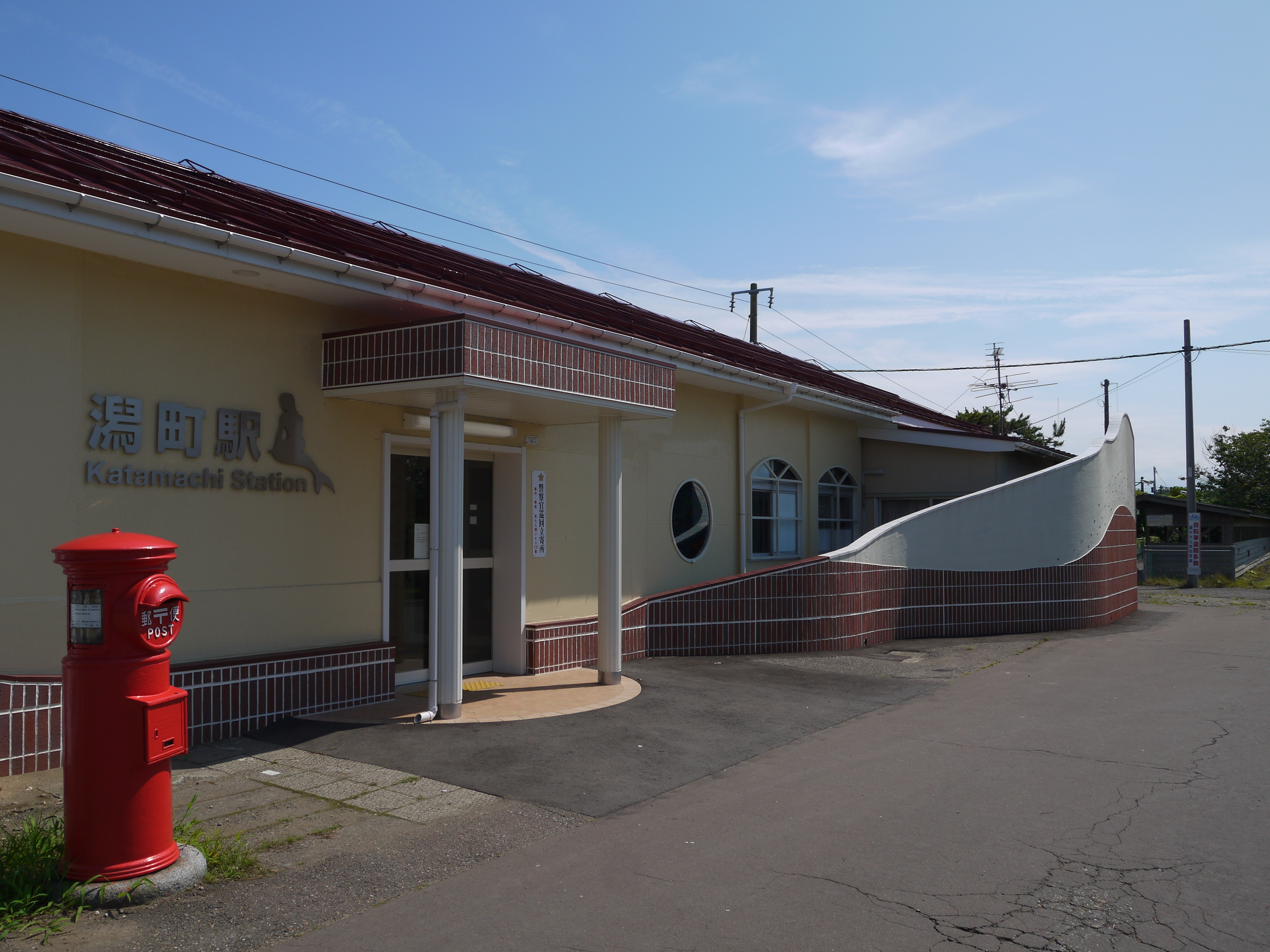
- Katamachi Station in July 2015

General information
- Location: 539-3 Katamachi, Ogata-ku, Jōetsu-shi, Niigata-ken 949-3103; Japan
- Coordinates: 37.2344°N 138.3397°E
- Operator: JR East
- Line: ■ Shin'etsu Main Line
- Platforms: 2 side platforms
- Tracks: 2

Other information
- Status: Unstaffed
- Website: Official website

History
- Opened: 15 July 1897; 129 years ago

Passengers
- 178 (daily) (FY2016)

Services
Preceding station	JR East	Following station
Dosokohama towards Naoetsu	Shin'etsu Main Line Local	Jōgehama towards Niigata
Location
- Location within JR Shinetsu Main Line Location within Japan

Katamachi Station (潟町駅, Katamachi-eki) is a railway station on the Shinetsu Main Line in the city of Jōetsu, Niigata, Japan, operated by East Japan Railway Company (JR East).

== Lines ==
Katamachi Station is served by the Shin'etsu Main Line, and is 11.2 kilometers from the terminus of the line at Naoetsu Station.

== Station layout ==
The station consists of two opposed side platforms, connected by a footbridge. The station is unattended.

=== Platforms ===
1	■ Shin'etsu Main Line	for Nagaoka and Niigata
2	■ Shin'etsu Main Line	for Naoetsu

== History ==
The station opened on 13 May 1897. With the privatization of Japanese National Railways (JNR) on 1 April 1987, the station came under the control of JR East.

== Passenger statistics ==
In fiscal 2016, the station was used by an average of 178 passengers daily (boarding passengers only).

== Surrounding area ==
- former Katamachi town hall
- Katamachi Post Office
- Japan National Route 8

== See also ==
- List of railway stations in Japan
