= Kasashima Station =

Railway station in Kashiwazaki, Niigata Prefecture, Japan

Kasashima Station 笠島駅
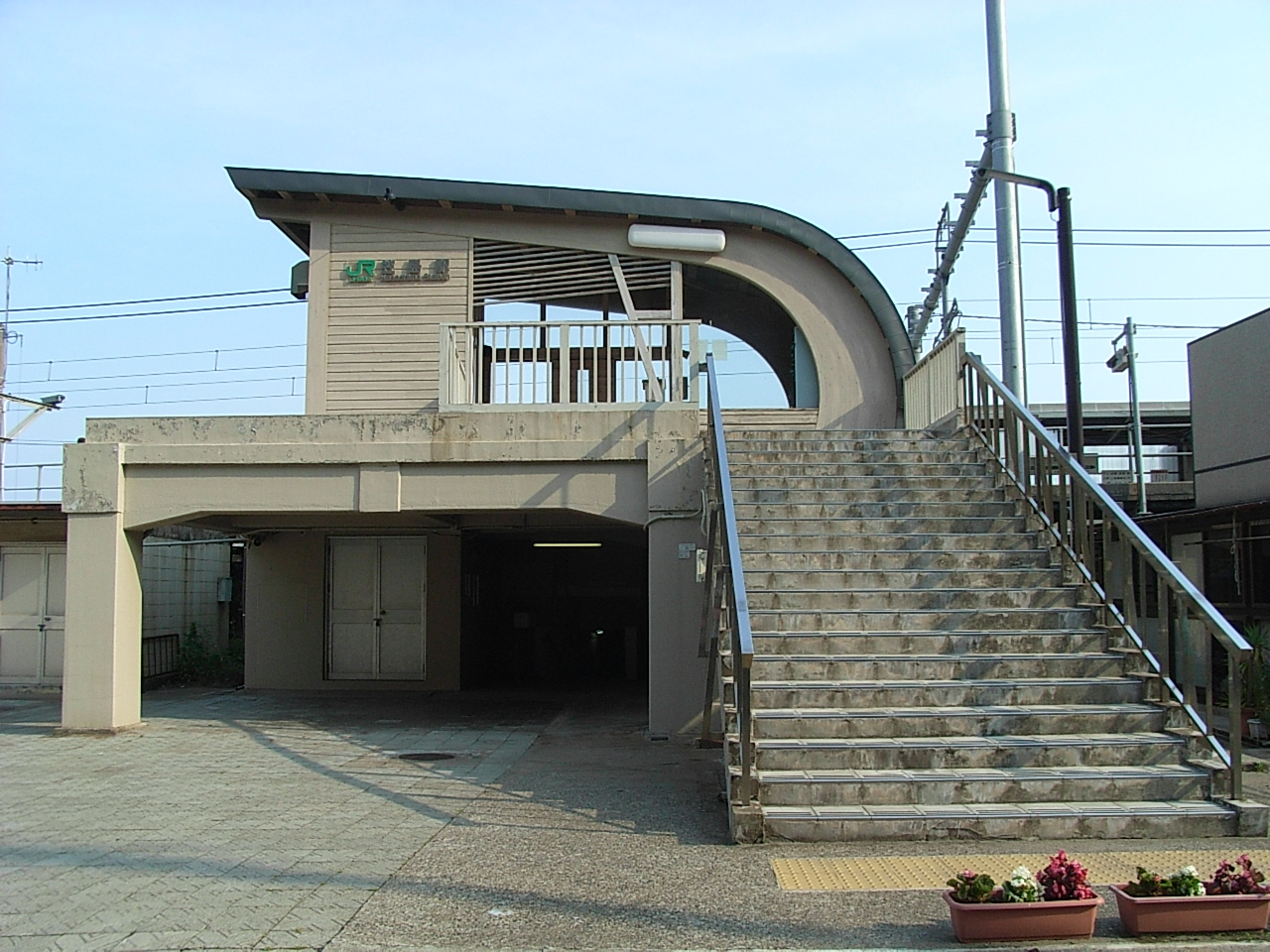
- Kasashima Station, April 2006

General information
- Location: 802 Kasahima-cho, Kashiwazaki-shi, Niigata-ken 949-3662; Japan
- Coordinates: 37.3359°N 138.4670°E
- Operator: JR East
- Line: ■ Shin'etsu Main Line
- Distance: 27.4 km to Naoetsu
- Platforms: 2 side platforms

Other information
- Status: Unstaffed
- Website: Official website

History
- Opened: 1 July 1952; 74 years ago

Services
Preceding station	JR East	Following station
Yoneyama towards Naoetsu	Shin'etsu Main Line Local	Ōmigawa towards Niigata
Location
- Location within JR Shinetsu Main Line Location within Japan

Kasashima Station (笠島駅, Kasashima-eki) is a railway station in Kashiwazaki, Niigata, Japan, operated by East Japan Railway Company (JR East).

== Lines ==
Kasashima Station is served by the Shin'etsu Main Line and is 27.4 kilometers from the terminus of the line at Naoetsu.

== Station layout ==
The station consists of two elevated unnumbered opposed side platforms connected by a passage underneath, serving two tracks. The station is unattended.

=== Platforms ===
south	■ Shin'etsu Main Line	for Naoetsu
north	■ Shin'etsu Main Line	for Kashiwazaki and Nagaoka

== History ==
Kasahima Station opened on 1 July 1952. With the privatization of Japanese National Railways (JNR) on 1 April 1987, the station came under the control of JR East. A new station building was completed in 2004.

== Surrounding area ==
- National Route 8

== See also ==
- List of railway stations in Japan
