= Jōgehama Station =

Railway station in Jōetsu, Niigata Prefecture, Japan

Jōgehama Station 上下浜駅
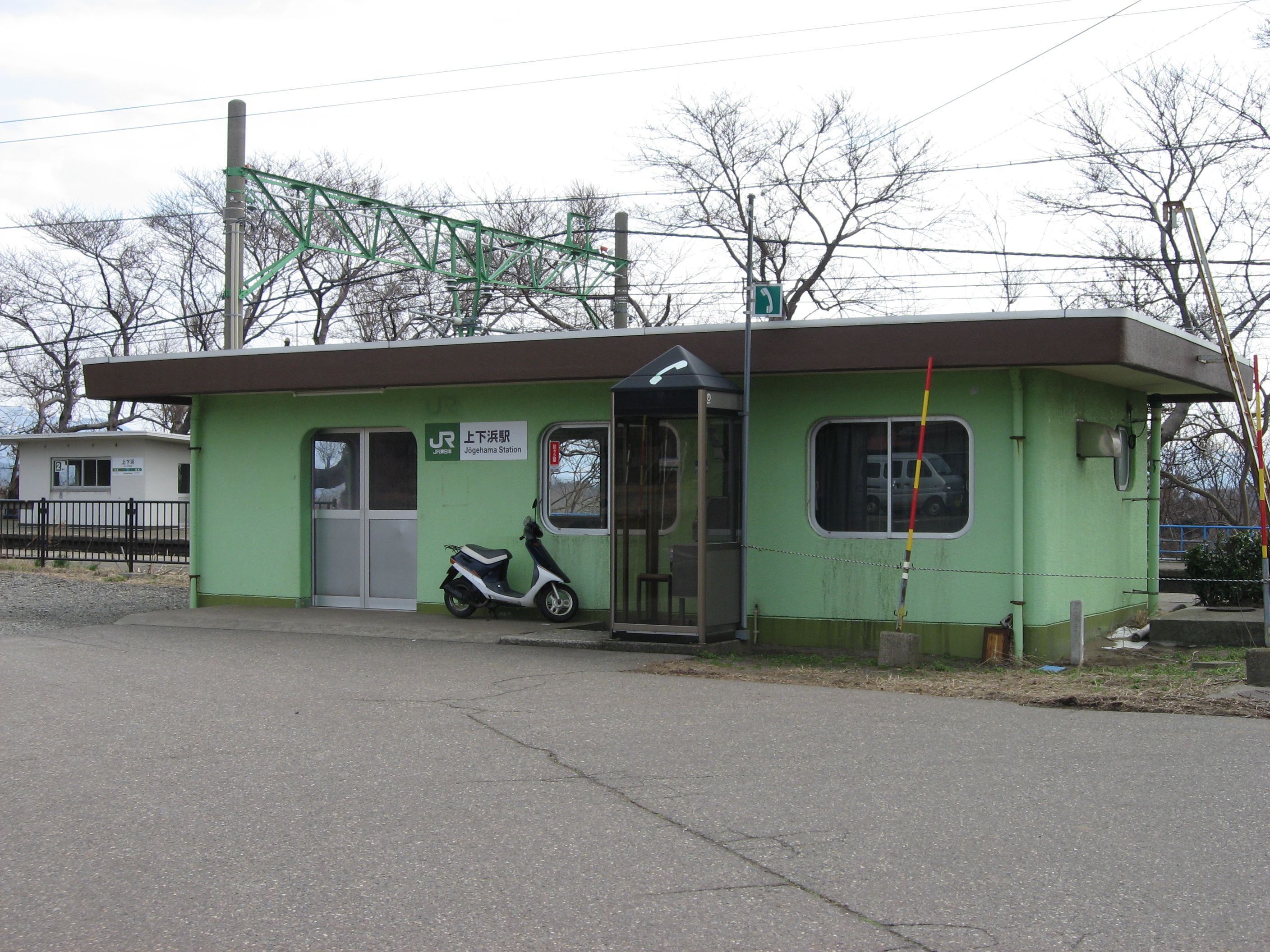
- Jōgehama Station in March 2009

General information
- Location: 583 Jōgehama, Kakizaki-ku, Jōetsu-shi, Niigata-ken 949-3255; Japan
- Coordinates: 37.2521°N 138.3616°E
- Operator: JR East
- Line: ■ Shin'etsu Main Line
- Platforms: 2 side platforms
- Tracks: 2

Other information
- Status: Unstaffed
- Website: Official website

History
- Opened: 15 July 1952; 74 years ago

Services
Preceding station	JR East	Following station
Katamachi (Jōetsu) towards Naoetsu	Shin'etsu Main Line Local	Kakizaki towards Niigata
Location
- Location within JR Shinetsu Main Line Location within Japan

Jōgehama Station (上下浜駅, Jōgehama-eki) is a railway station on the Shinetsu Main Line in the city of Jōetsu, Niigata, Japan, operated by East Japan Railway Company (JR East).

== Lines ==
Jōgehama Station is served by the Shin'etsu Main Line, and is 14.0 kilometers from the terminus of the line at Naoetsu Station.

== Station layout ==
The station consists of two opposed side platforms, connected by a footbridge. The station is unattended.

=== Platforms ===
1	■ Shin'etsu Main Line	for Nagaoka and Niigata
2	■ Shin'etsu Main Line	for Naoetsu

== History ==
The station opened on 15 July 1952. With the privatization of Japanese National Railways (JNR) on 1 April 1987, the station came under the control of JR East.

== Surrounding area ==
- Jōgehama Onsen
- National Route 8

== See also ==
- List of railway stations in Japan
