= Niigata (city) =

Niigata 新潟市
- Prefecture capital and Designated city
- Niigata City
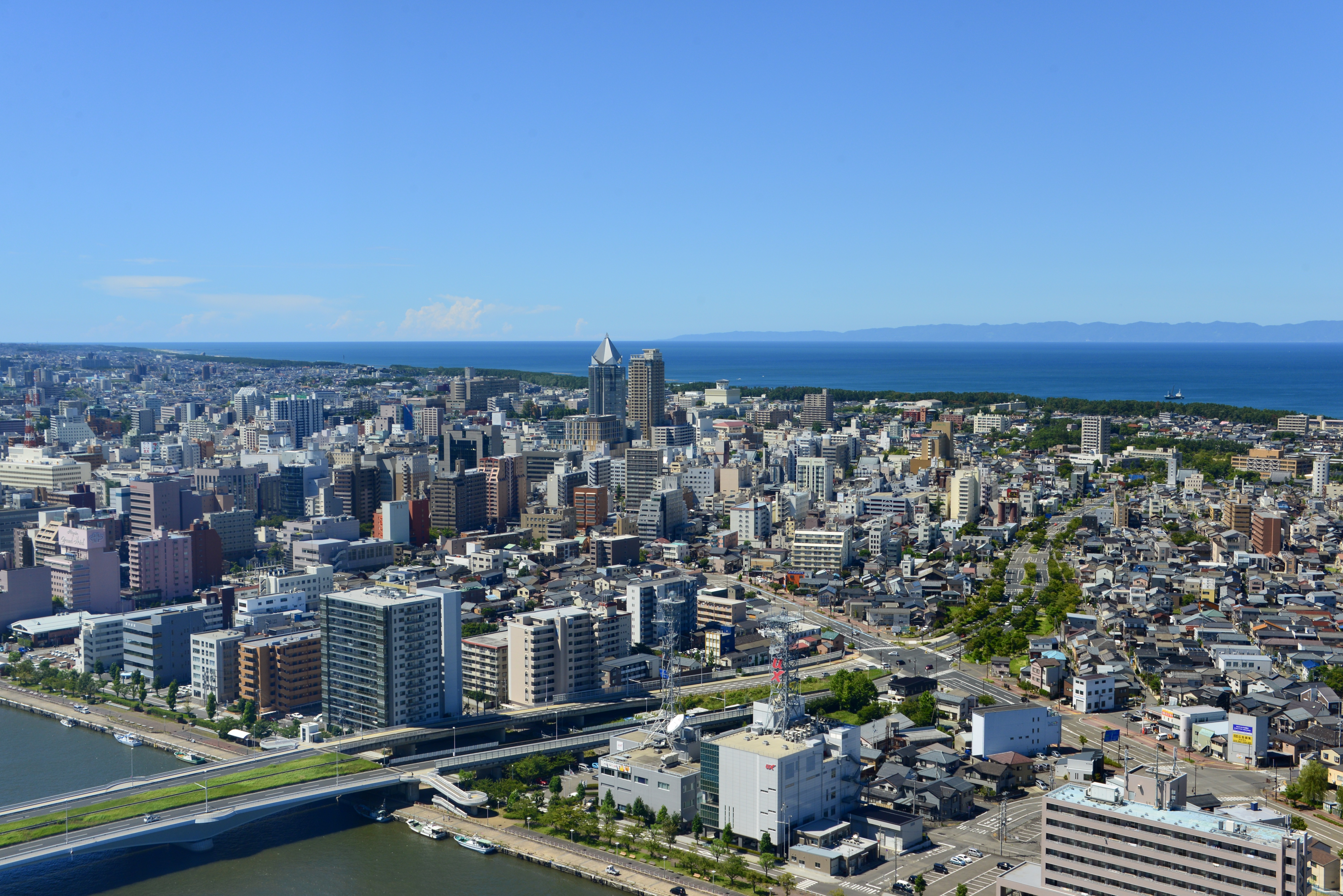
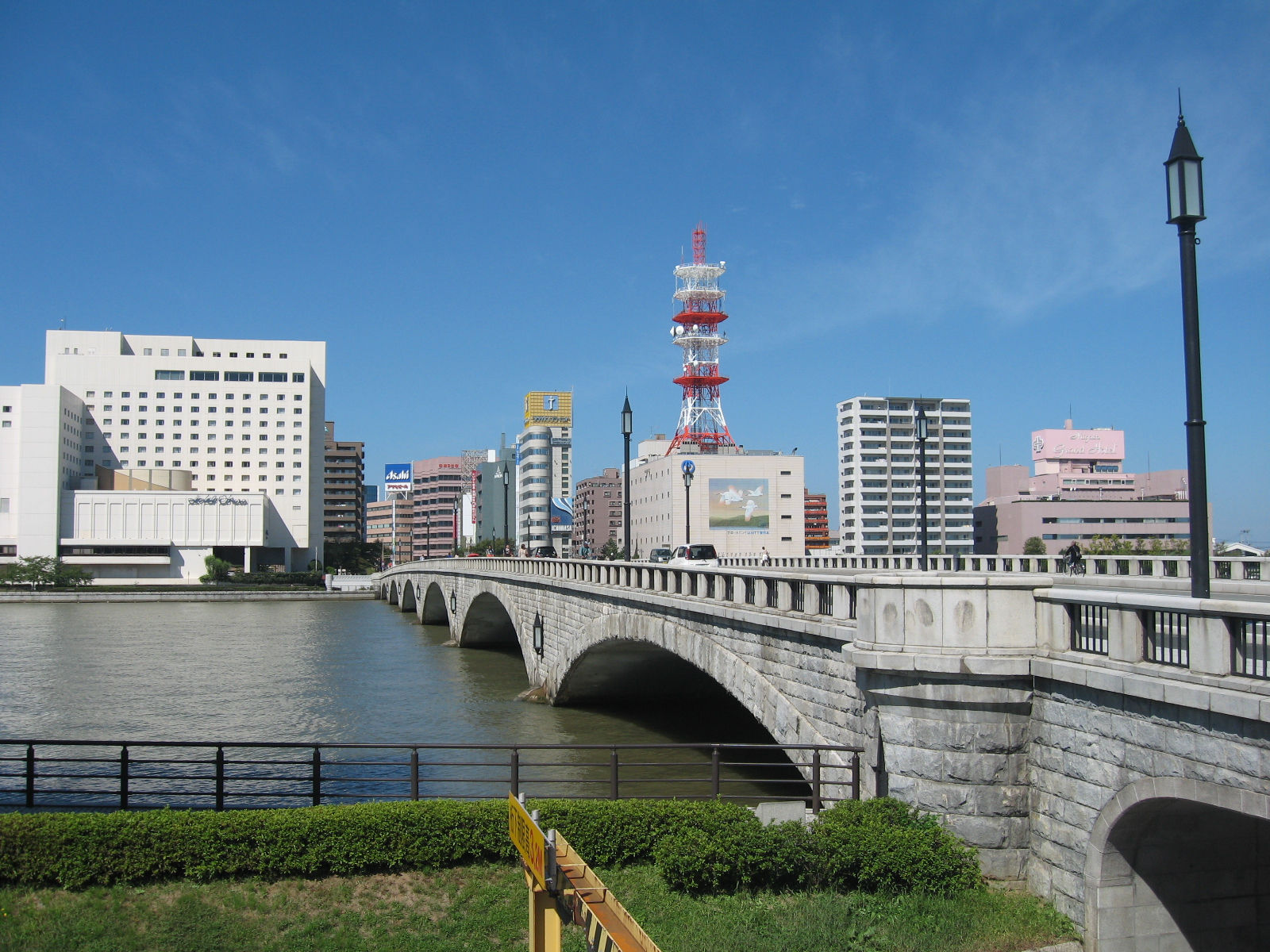
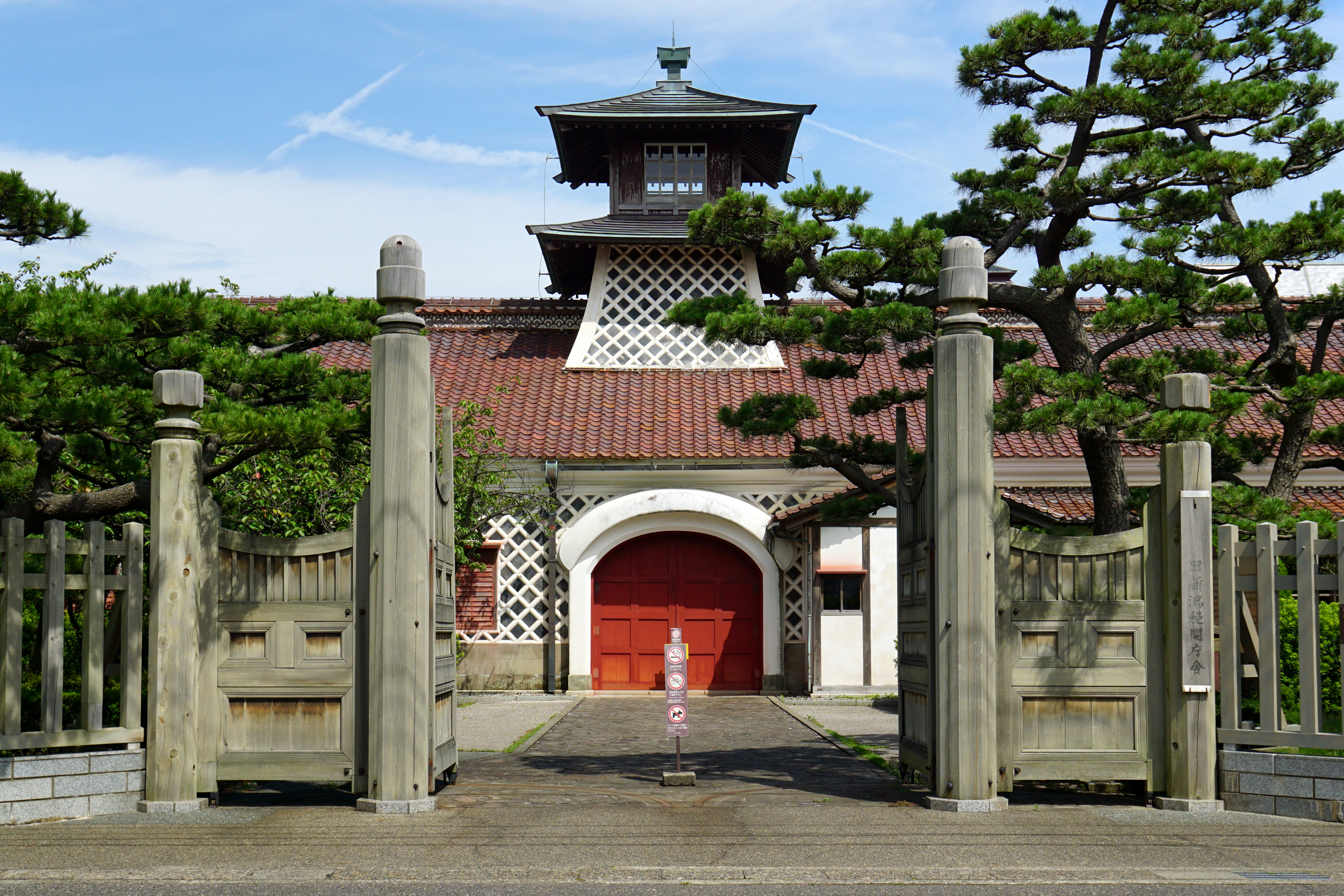
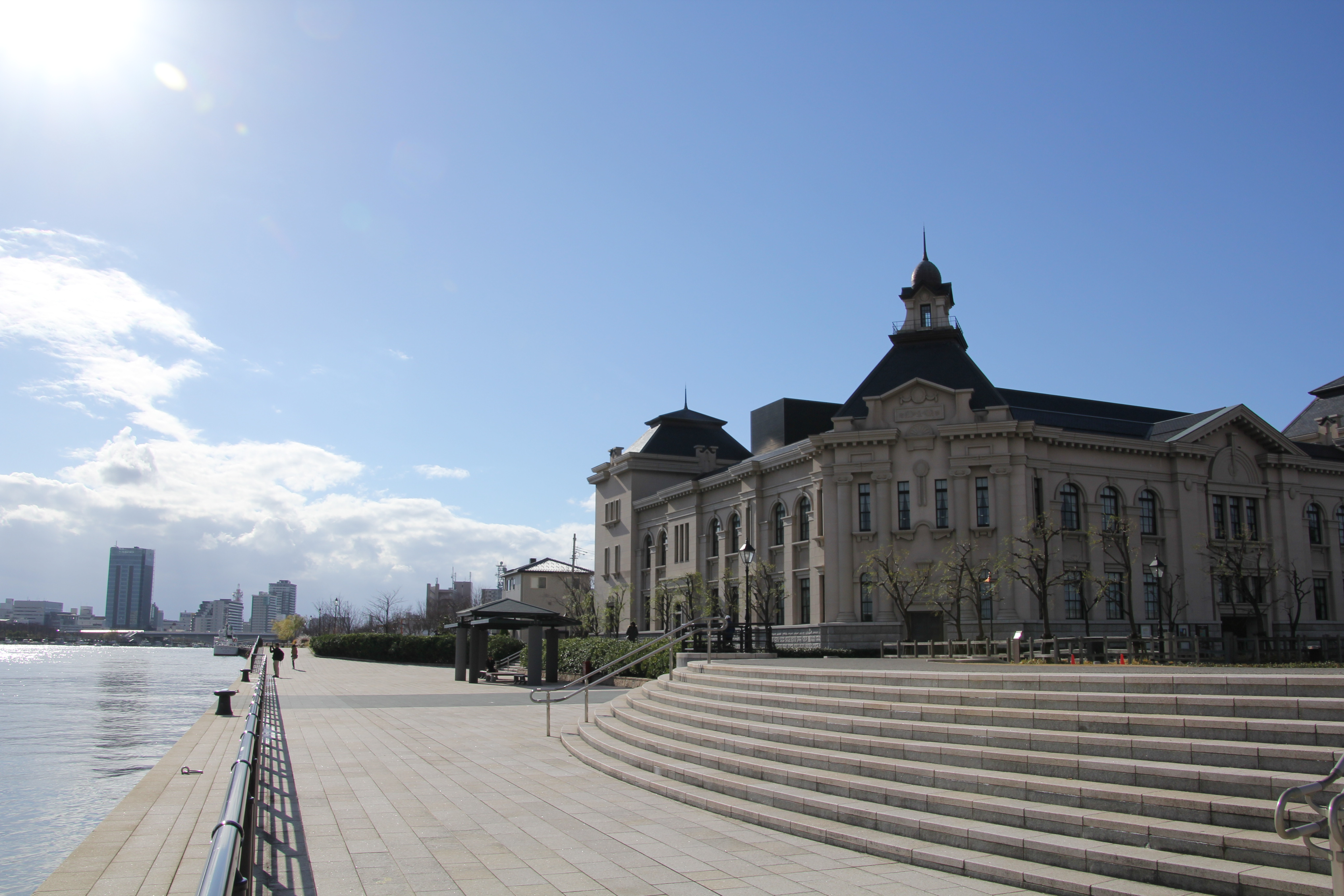
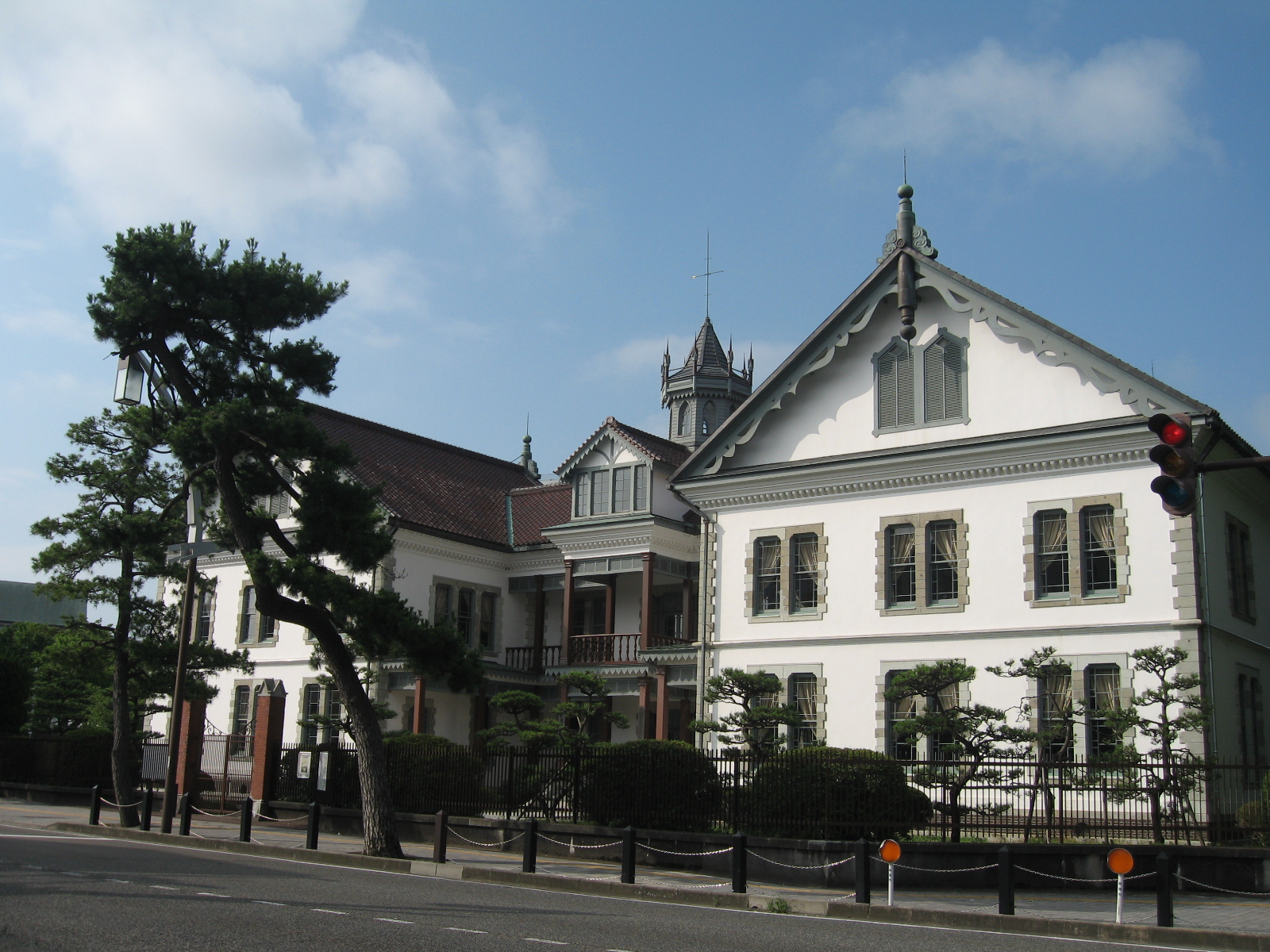
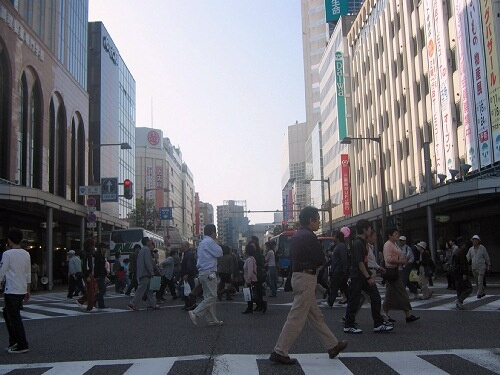
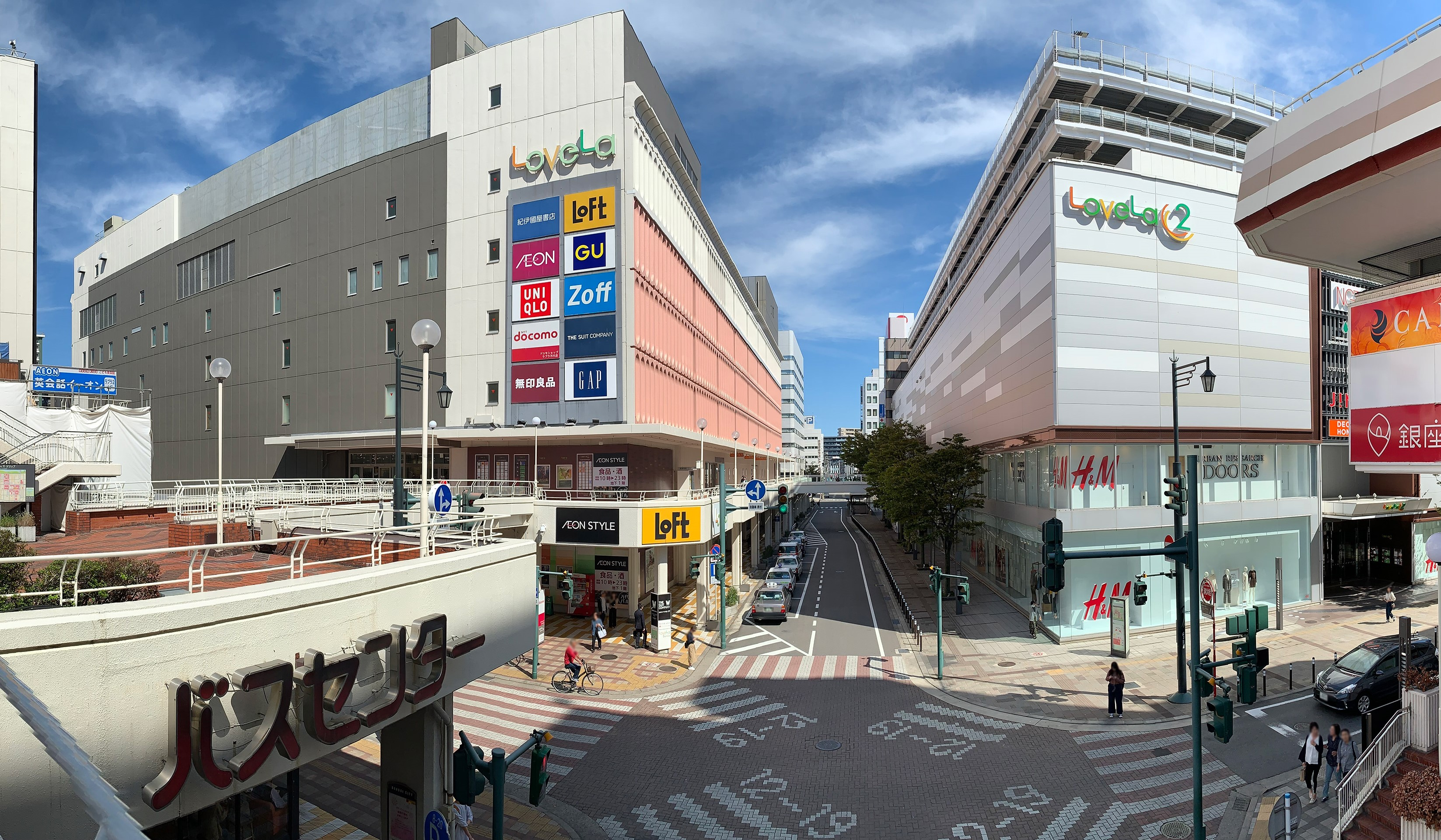
- Skyline of Niigata from Toki Messe Bandai Bridge Former Niigata Customs House Minatopia Niigata Prefectural Government Memorial Hall Furumachi Bandai City

- Flag Seal

- Location of Niigata in Niigata Prefecture

- Coordinates: 37°54′58″N 139°2′11″E
- Country: Japan
- Region: Chūbu (Kōshin'etsu) (Hokuriku)
- Prefecture: Niigata
- City Status: April 1, 1889 city incorporation )

Government
  - Mayor: Yaichi Nakahara (from November, 2018)

Area
  - Prefecture capital and Designated city: 726.45 km^{2} (280.48 sq mi)

Population (July 1, 2019)
  - Prefecture capital and Designated city: 797,591
  - Density: 1,097.9/km^{2} (2,843.6/sq mi)
  - Metro (2015): 1,060,013 (17th)
- Time zone: UTC+9 (Japan Standard Time)
- Phone number: 025-243-4894
- Address: 1-602-1 Gakkōchō-dōri, Chūō-ku, Niigata-shi, Niigata-ken 951-8550
- Climate: Cfa
- Website: city.niigata.lg.jp
- Symbols
- Bird: Swan
- Flower: Tulip
- Tree: Willow

Niigata
- "Niigata" in kanji

Japanese name
- Kanji: 新潟
Transcriptions
- Romanization: Niigata

Niigata (新潟市, Niigata-shi; Japanese pronunciation: [ɲ̟ìí.ɡä́.tä́(.ɕì), -ŋä́-, ɲ̟íí-]) is a city located in the northern part of Niigata Prefecture (Kaetsu area). It is the capital and the most populous city of Niigata Prefecture, and one of the cities designated by government ordinance of Japan, located in the Chūbu region of Japan. It is the most populous city on the west coast of Honshu, and the second most populous city in the Chūbu region after Nagoya. It faces the Sea of Japan and Sado Island. As of 1 September 2022, the city had an estimated population of 779,049, and a population density of 1,072 persons per km^{2}. The total area is 726.45 square kilometres (280.48 sq mi). Greater Niigata, the Niigata Metropolitan Employment Area, has a GDP of US$43.3 billion as of 2010.

It is the only government-designated city on the west coast of Honshu. It has the greatest habitable area of cities in Japan (list of Japanese cities by area). It is designated as a reform base for the large scale agriculture under (National Strategic Special Zones of Japan) initiatives.

== Overview ==
Niigata was one of the cities incorporated by the legislation effective on April 1, 1889 (Meiji 22). With a long history as a port town, Niigata served the function of the network junction between the maritime traffic and those of Shinano and Agano river systems. It was designated as one of the five free treaty ports under the Treaty of Amity and Commerce between the United States and Japan, signed in 1858, just before the Meiji Restoration, and later started operations in 1869. Its importance in land and water transportation is still current.

Niigata's city government was established in 1889. Mergers with nearby municipalities in 2005 allowed the city's population to jump to 810,000. The annexation of the surrounding area has also given the city the greatest rice paddy field acreage in Japan. On April 1, 2007, it became the first government-designated city on the coast of the Sea of Japan of Honshu. There are eight wards (described later) in the city.

Until the 1950s, a system of canals were lined along by the willow trees in the downtown area of Niigata. Therefore, the city is sometimes called the "City of Water" or "City of Willows" as detailed later. Niigata produced many manga artists (see: Artists and writers). It is also known to have an extensive network of bypass roads. Bandai bridge, NEXT21, Toki Messe, Denka Big Swan Stadium, Niigata Nippo Media Ship are considered to be the key symbol landmarks in the city (see: Local attractions).

=== Toponymy ===
The place name "Niigata" was first recorded in 1520 (Eisho 17). Its name in kanji can be translated as 新 "new" and 潟 "lagoon".

However, as there is no record about the origin of the name, this had led to many theories.

- First "Niigata" was a large lagoon at the mouth of the Shinano river.
- Second it was an inland bay at the river's entrance.
- Third it was the name of a village that stood on an island within the estuary.
- Fourth it referred to another settlement that relocated to the Furumachi district and that in turn gave its name to a nearby lagoon.

=== Cityscapes ===
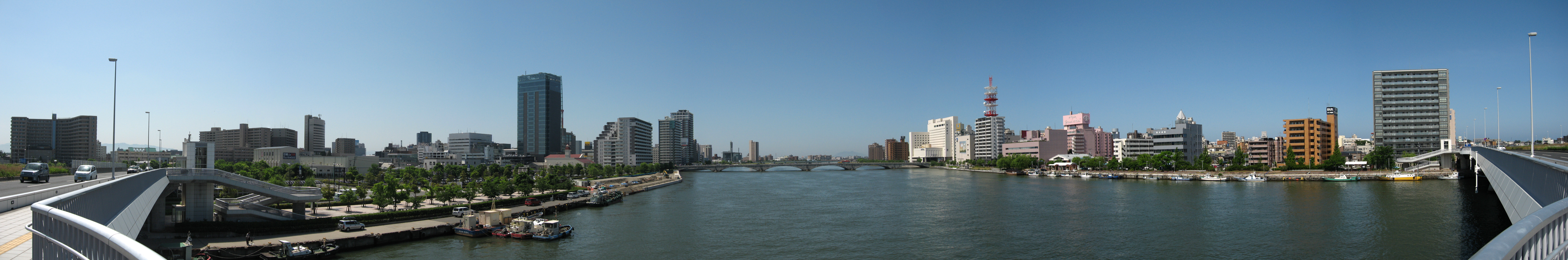
The central city area of Niigata City, viewed from the upper sidewalk of the Ryuto Ohashi Bridge. The right side is Furumachi. The left side is Bandai .
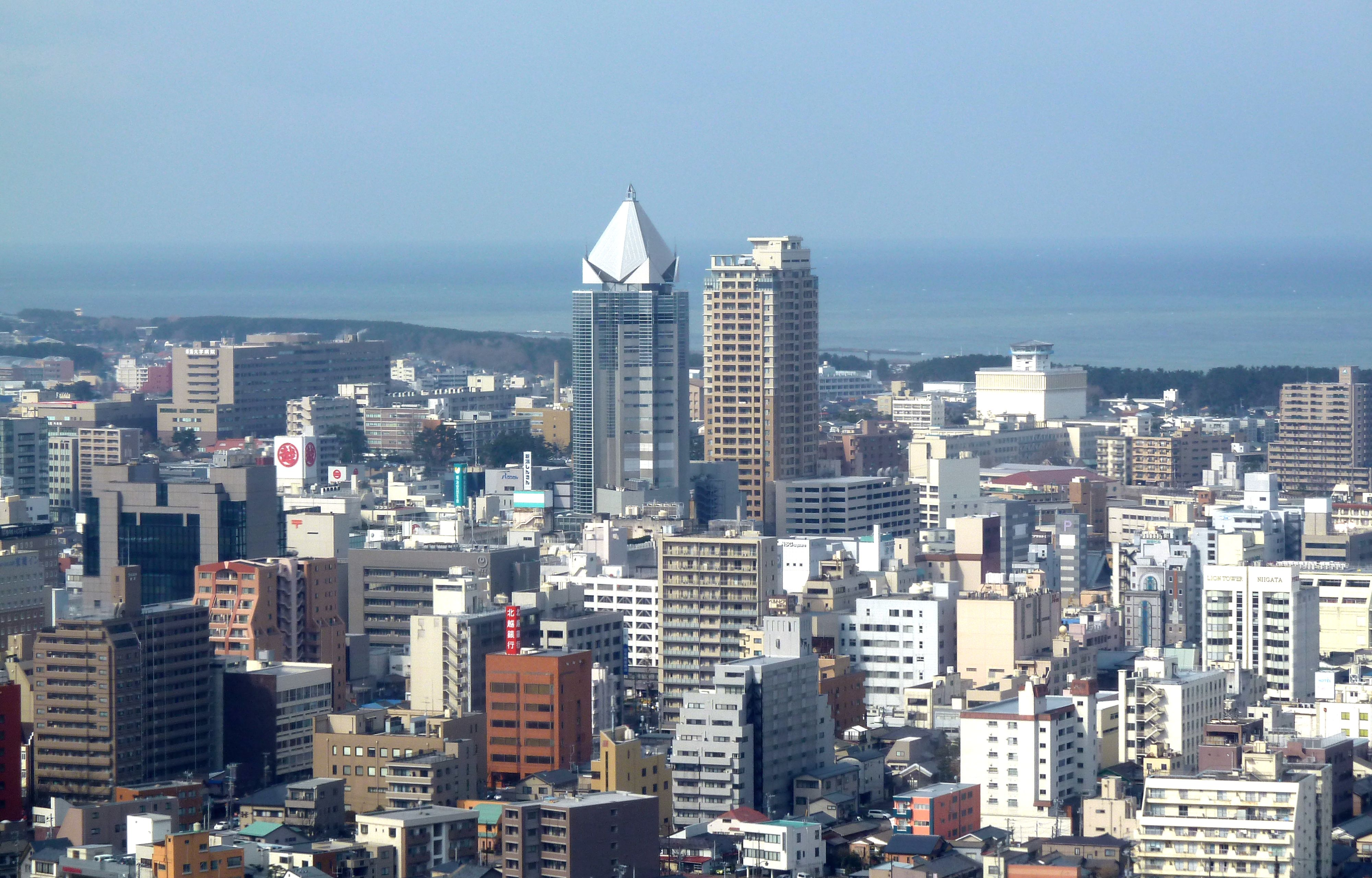
CBD of Niigata City (2012)

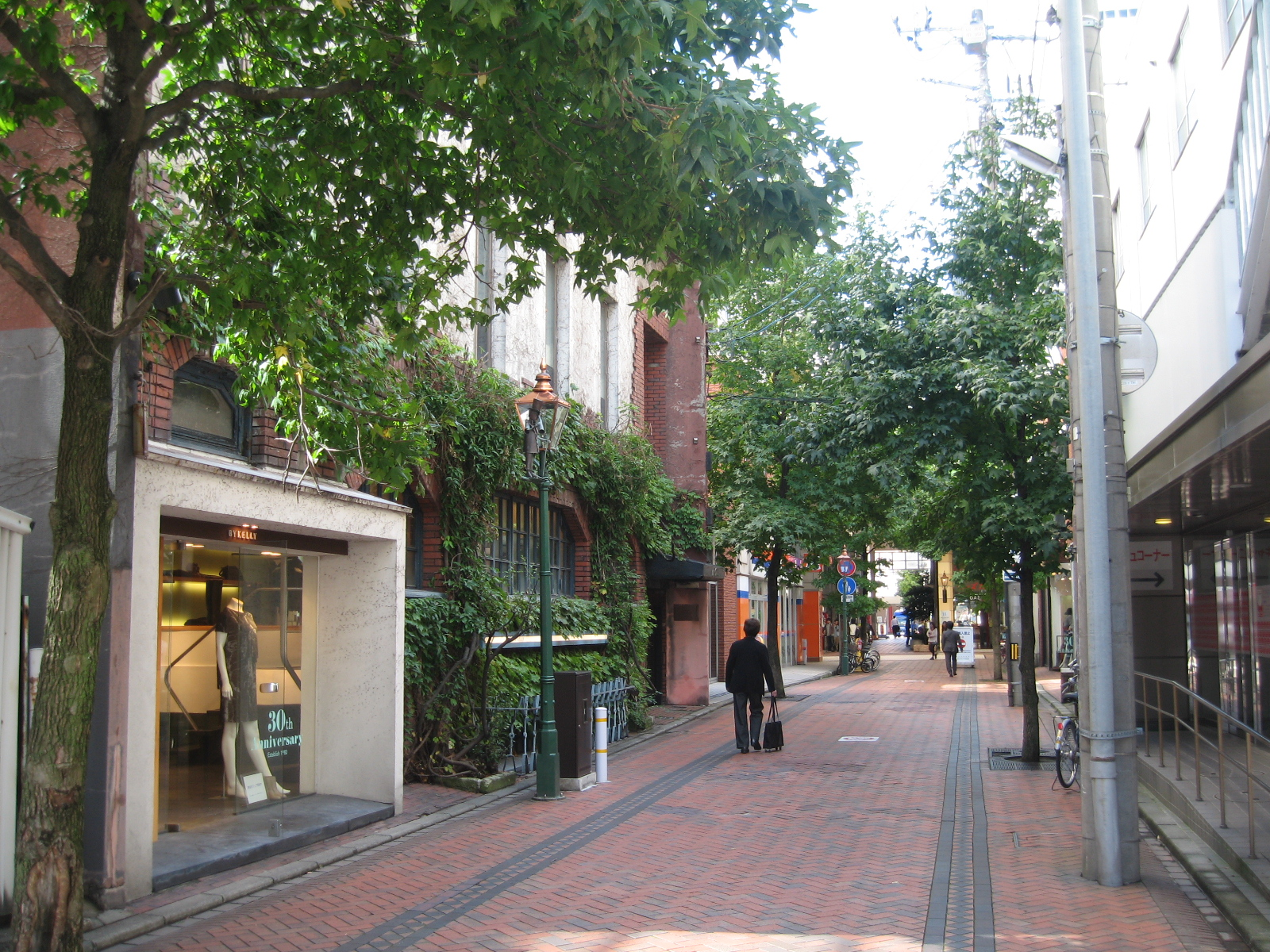
Downtown Furumachi (2013)

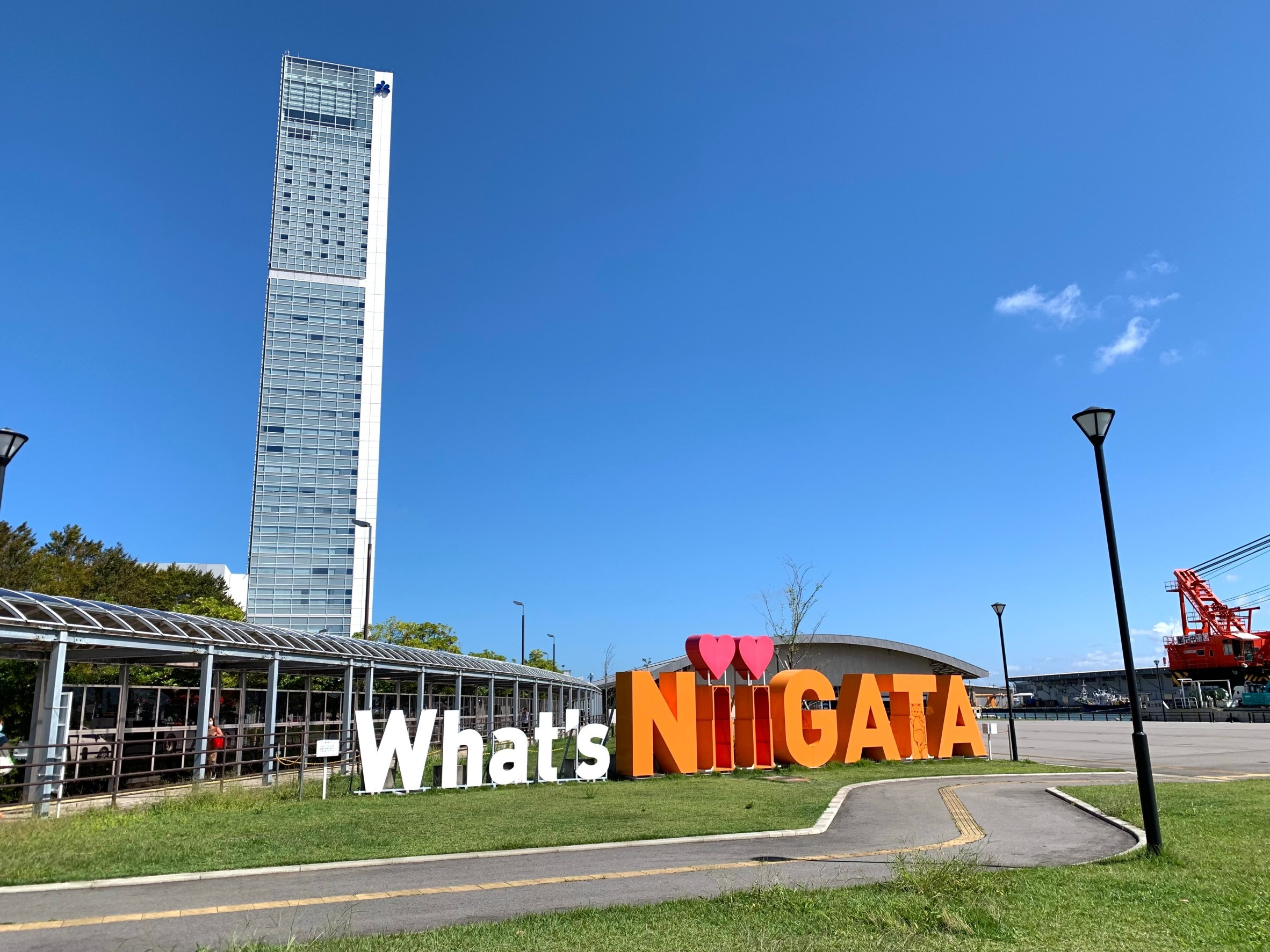
Toki Messe (2021)

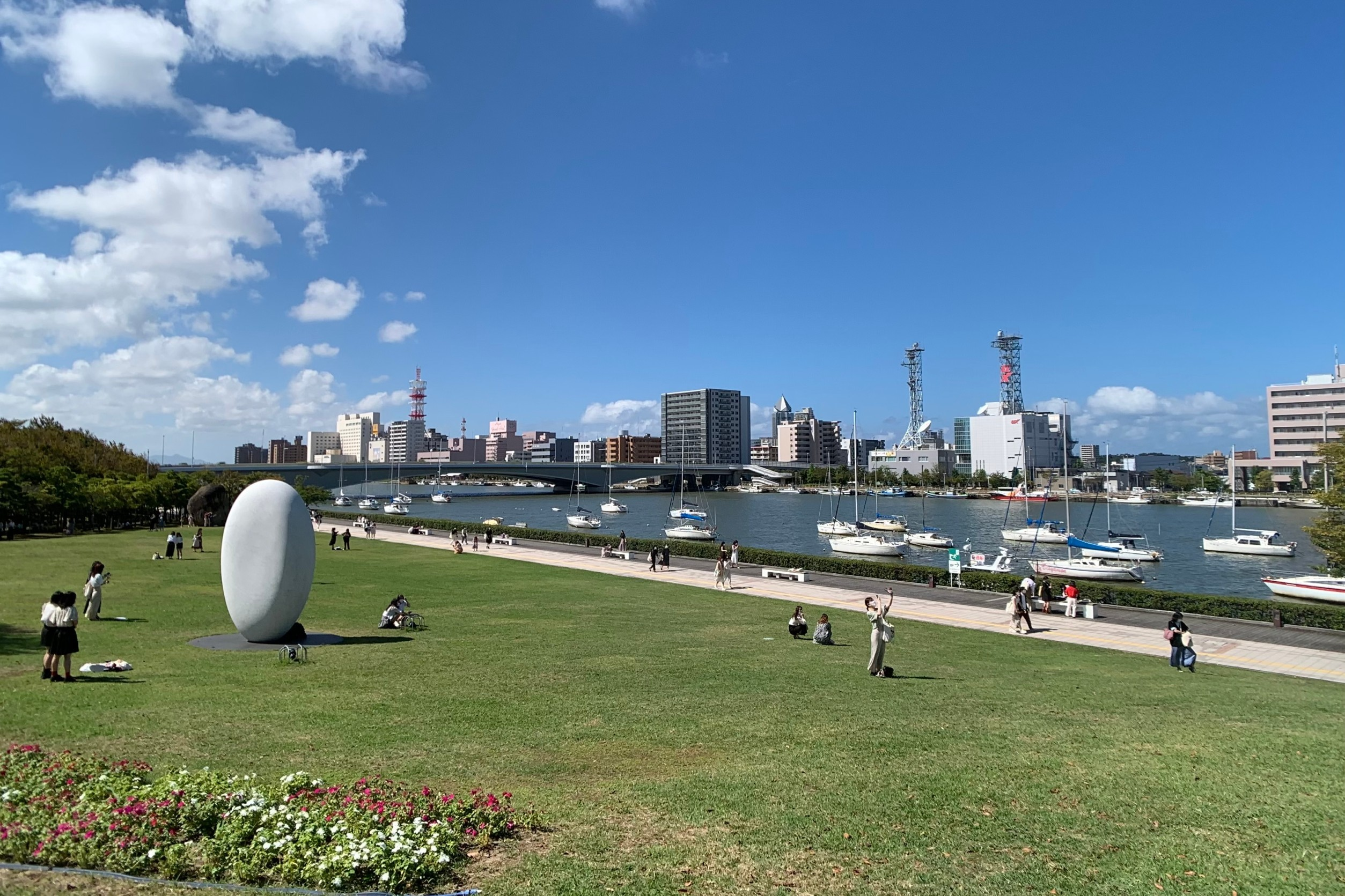
River Front Park (2021)

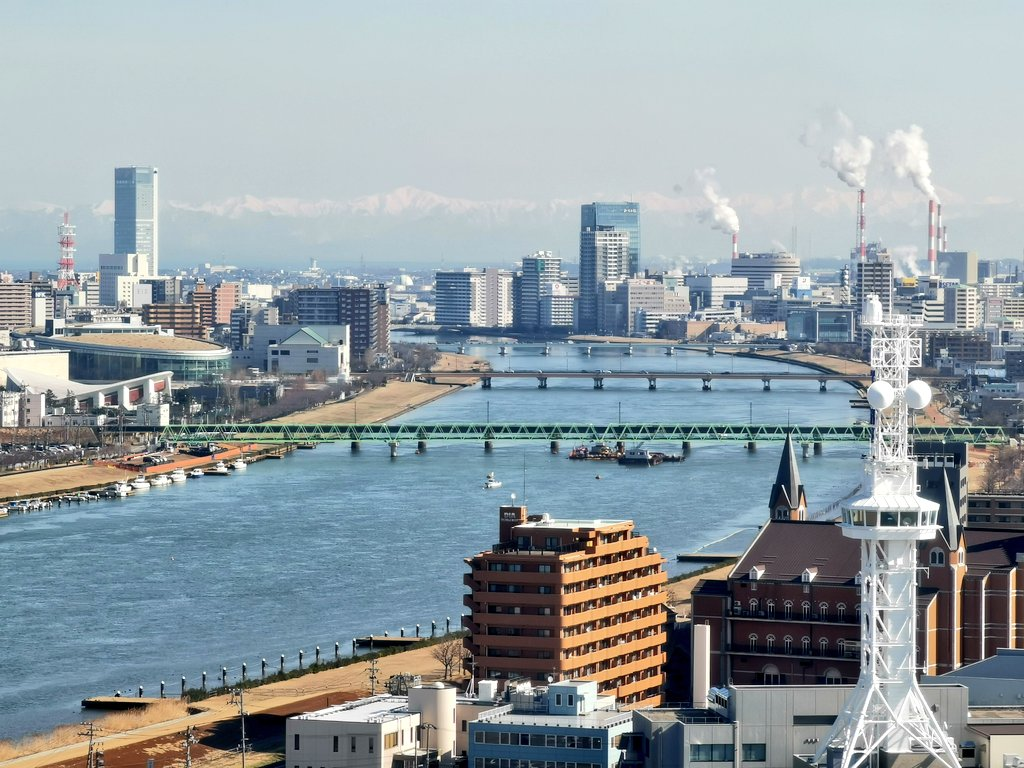
A view of Niigata City and Shinano River from observation deck of Niigata Prefecture Building (2022)

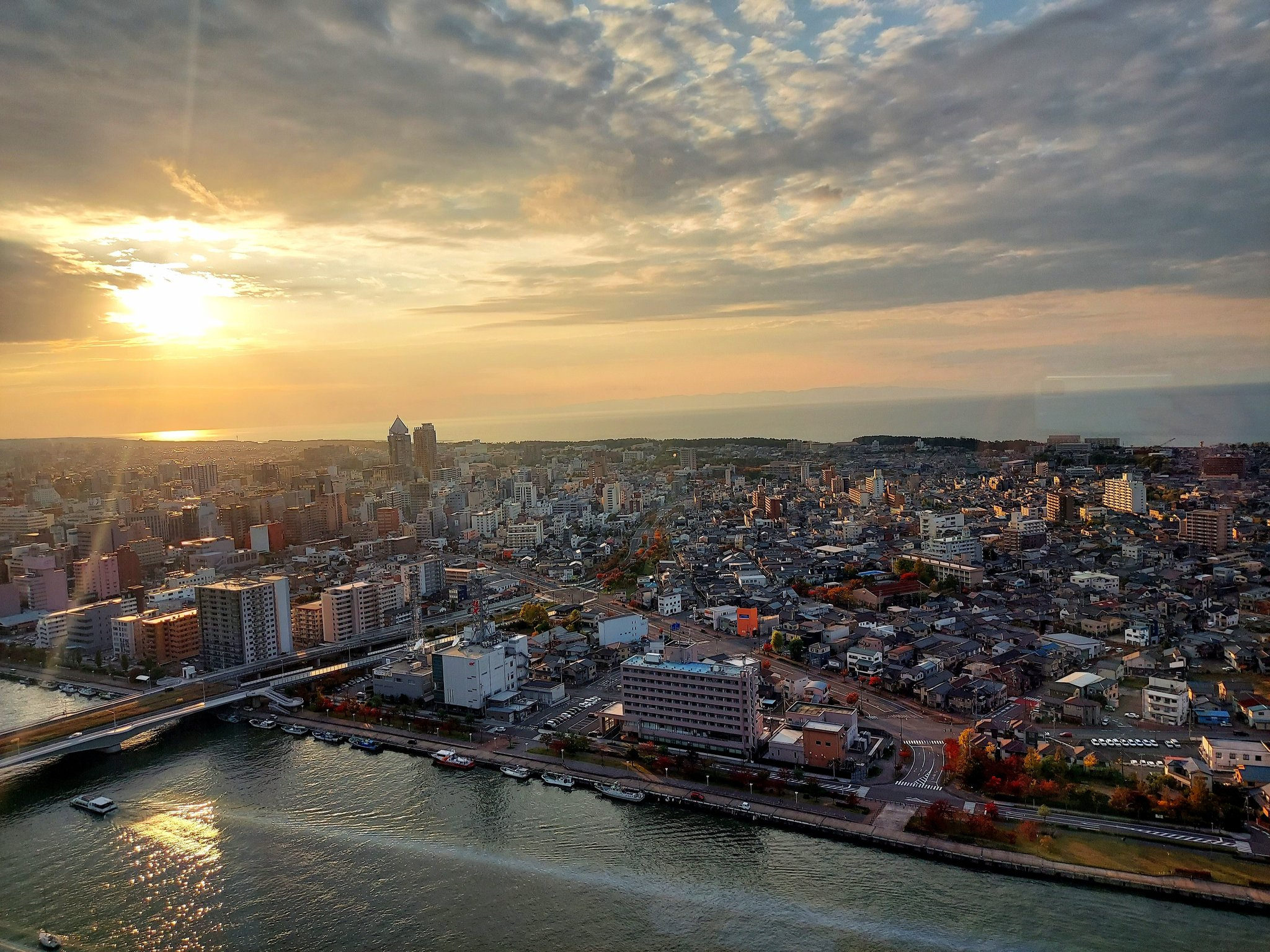
Sunset of Niigata City (2022)

== Geography ==
Niigata is situated on a fertile coastal plain on the Sea of Japan coast, facing Sado Island. The Shinano River and Agano River flow through the city.

Numerous wetlands, such as the Fukushimagata wetlands, can be found within the city limits. The Sakata lagoon is registered as a wetland of international importance under the Ramsar Convention.

Niigata City's low elevation and abundant water have made flood control and land reclamation important issues for the area throughout its history.

The city is sometimes called the "City of Water" (水の都, Mizu-no-miyako) because of the two rivers that flow through it, its position next to the Sea of Japan, its many wetlands, and the canals that used to run through the city. It is also sometimes referred to as the "City of Willows" (柳の都, Yanagi-no-miyako) or Ryuto (柳都) because of the willow trees that lined the old canals. In recent years, the city has been promoting itself as a "Designated City of Food and Flowers" (食と花の政令市, Shoku to hana no seireishi), highlighting its agricultural areas outside of the city center.

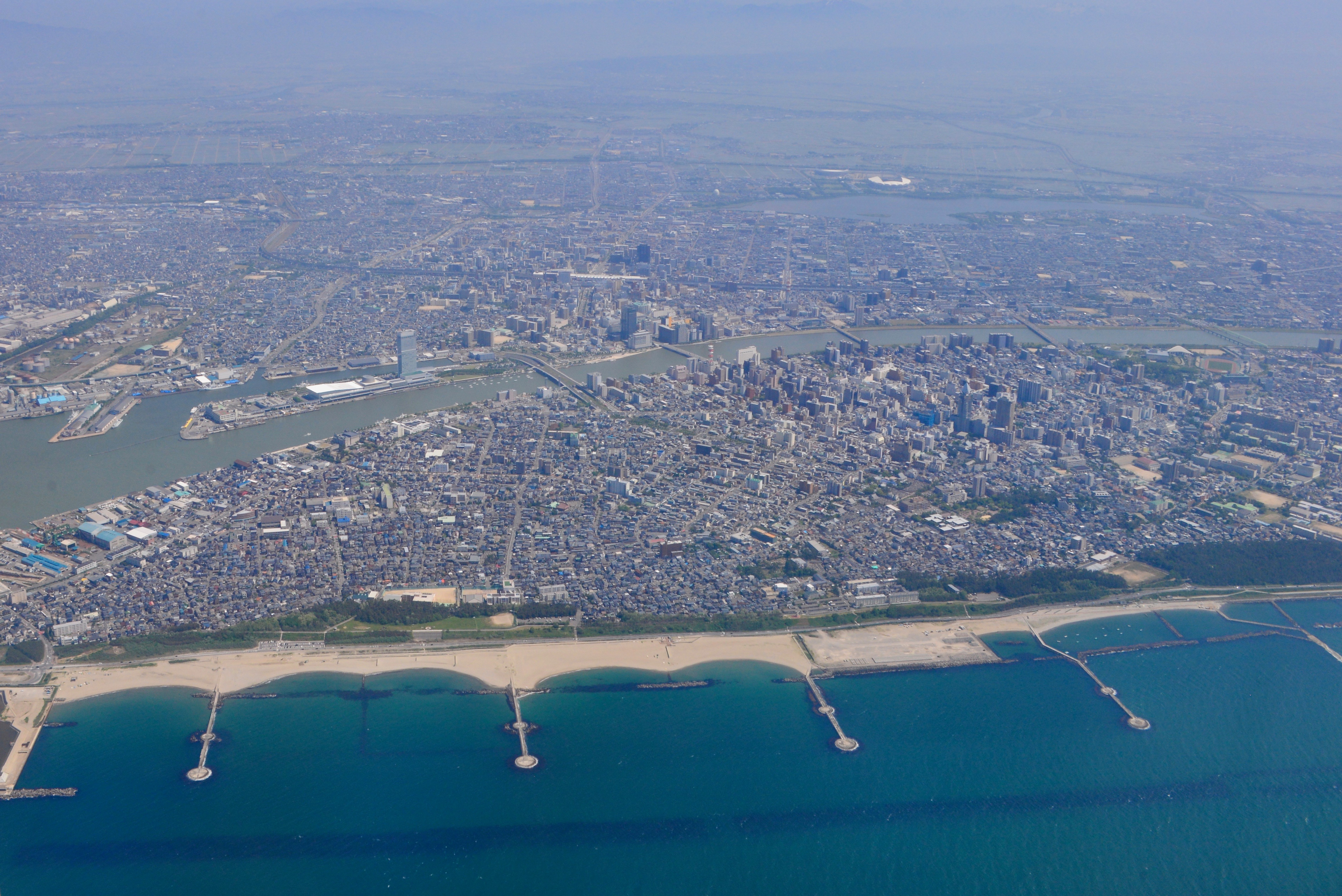
Aerial photo of Niigata

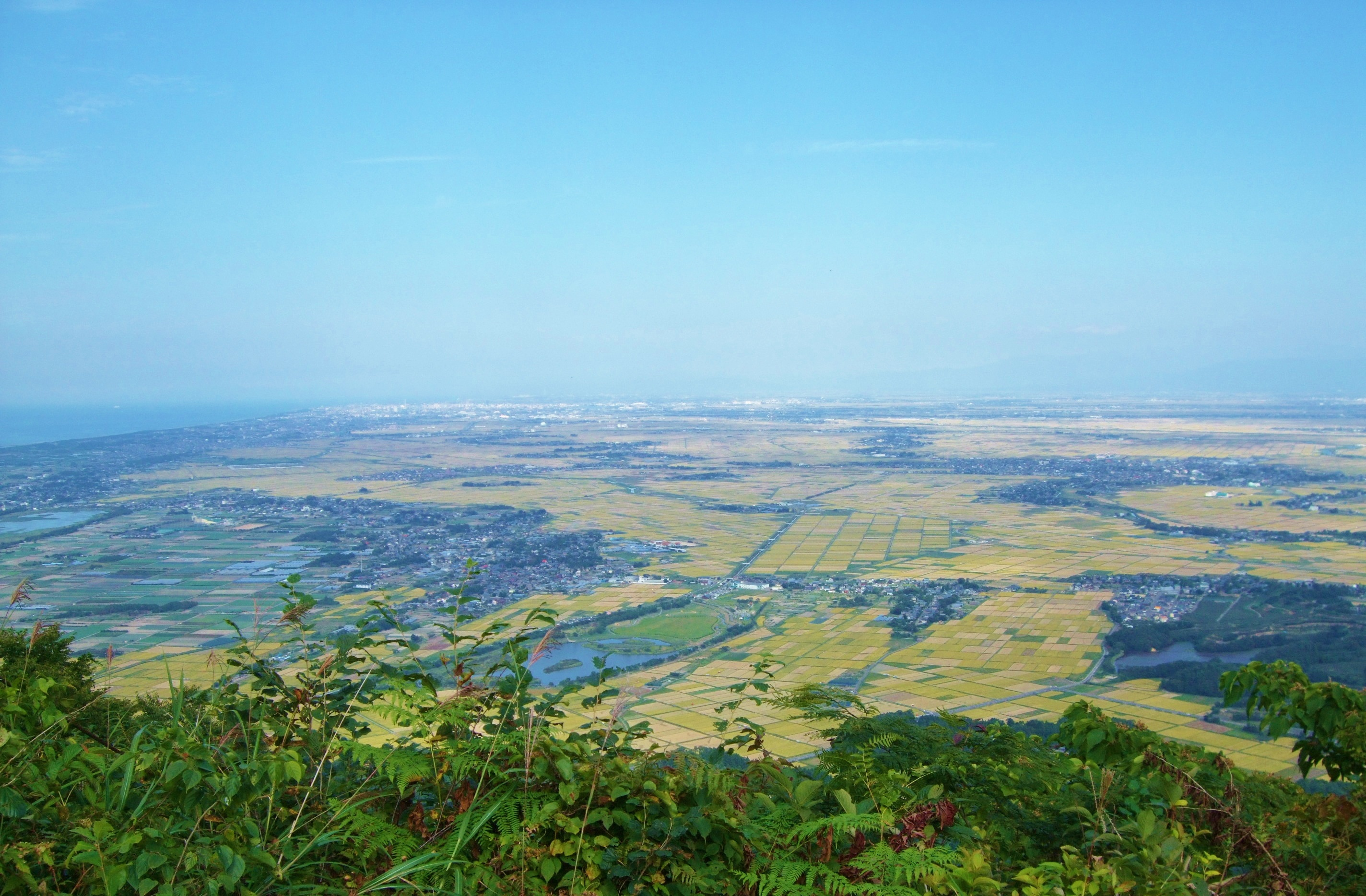
View of Echigo Plain from Mount Kakuda

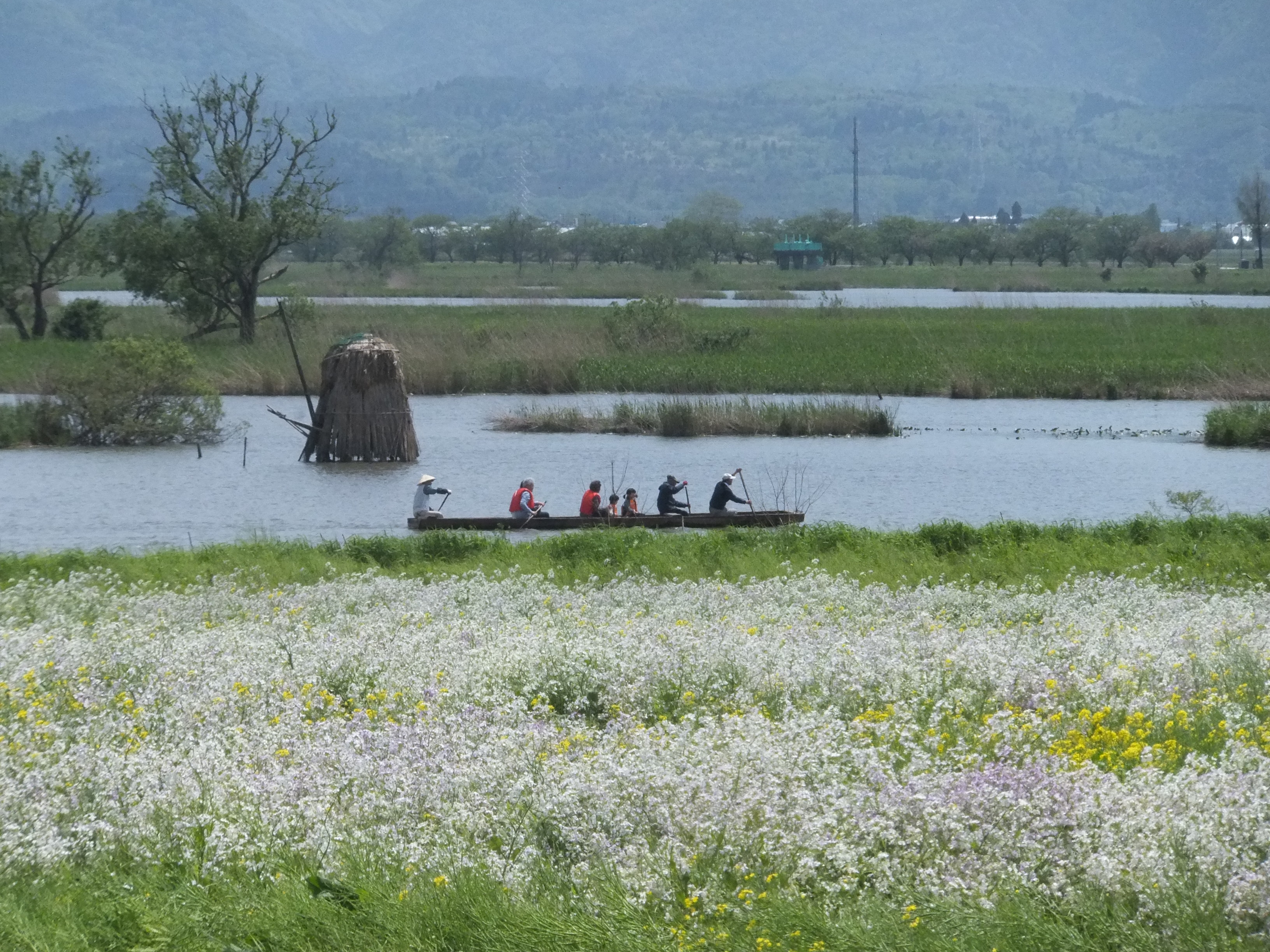
Lake Fukushimagata

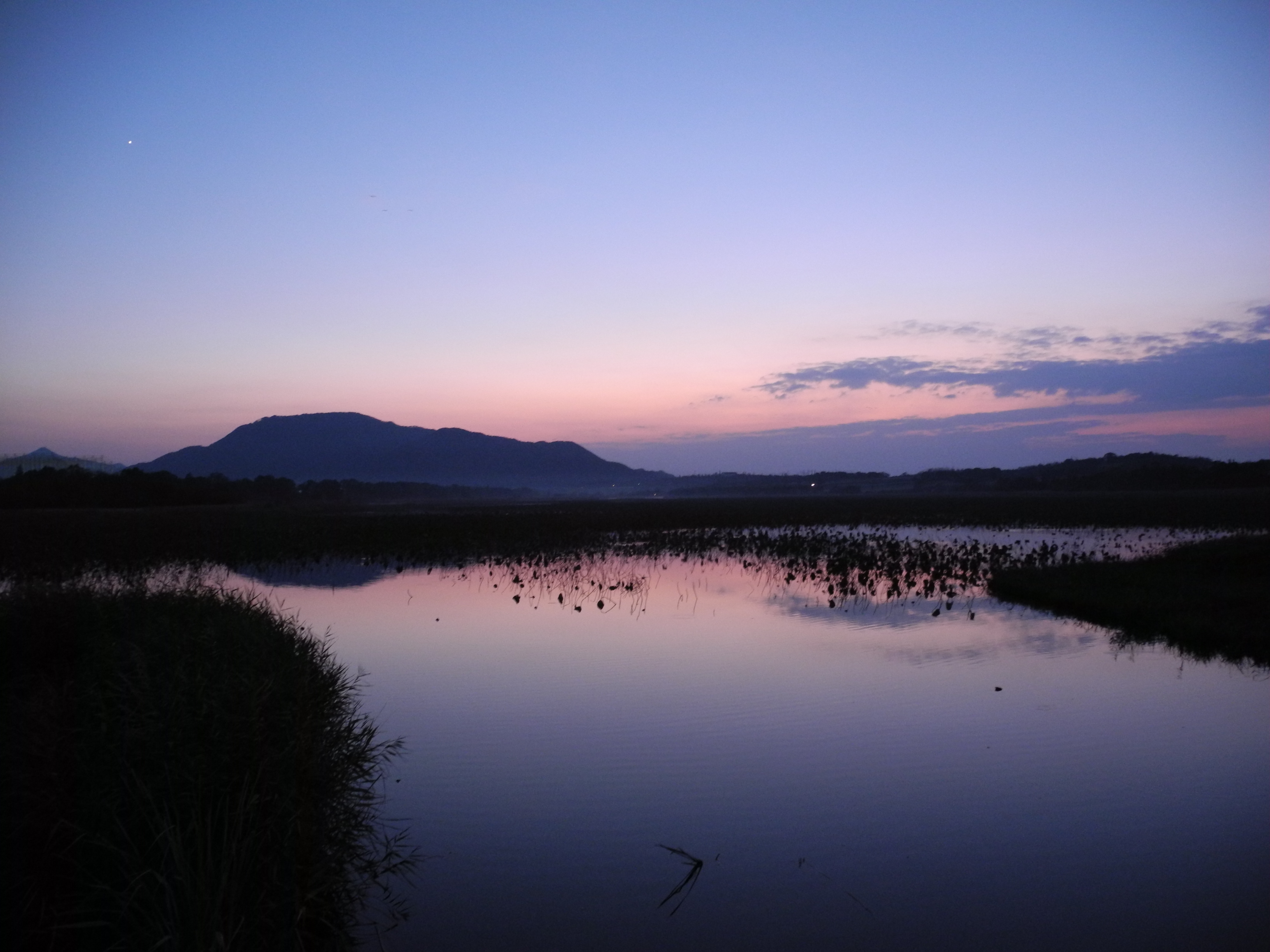
Lake Sakata

=== Climate ===
Niigata City features a humid subtropical climate (Cfa). However, due to high precipitation, it receives more yearly snowfall than cities with continental climates such as Moscow, Montreal or Oslo. Winters are characterized by their high humidity and strong winds from the Sea of Japan. While many other parts of Niigata Prefecture tend to have heavy snow, Niigata City itself usually receives less due to its low-lying elevation and the shielding effect of Sado Island.

On average, Niigata City has 269 days of precipitation each year, about 170 days of which see rain or snowfall measuring over 1 mm. The rainy season in July brings large amounts of rain, while the winter months, especially November and December, also have much precipitation.

In summer, the south wind makes the weather rather hot. Typhoons usually bring strong foehn winds to this area, generally causing somewhat higher temperatures than in other parts of Japan. The weather on the west coast of Honshu tends to be better during the summer months than on the Pacific coast.

Climate data for Niigata, elevation 4 m (13 ft), (1991−2020 normals, extremes 1881−present)
Month	Jan	Feb	Mar	Apr	May	Jun	Jul	Aug	Sep	Oct	Nov	Dec	Year
Record high °C (°F)	15.3 (59.5)	21.3 (70.3)	25.9 (78.6)	30.7 (87.3)	32.9 (91.2)	35.0 (95.0)	38.5 (101.3)	39.9 (103.8)	38.8 (101.8)	33.3 (91.9)	27.2 (81.0)	23.6 (74.5)	39.9 (103.8)
Mean maximum °C (°F)	11.2 (52.2)	14.0 (57.2)	19.1 (66.4)	25.2 (77.4)	29.0 (84.2)	30.6 (87.1)	34.7 (94.5)	35.7 (96.3)	33.5 (92.3)	27.0 (80.6)	21.3 (70.3)	15.1 (59.2)	36.5 (97.7)
Mean daily maximum °C (°F)	5.3 (41.5)	6.4 (43.5)	10.3 (50.5)	16.1 (61.0)	21.3 (70.3)	24.8 (76.6)	28.7 (83.7)	30.8 (87.4)	26.4 (79.5)	20.7 (69.3)	14.3 (57.7)	8.7 (47.7)	17.8 (64.0)
Daily mean °C (°F)	2.5 (36.5)	3.1 (37.6)	6.2 (43.2)	11.3 (52.3)	16.7 (62.1)	20.9 (69.6)	24.9 (76.8)	26.5 (79.7)	22.5 (72.5)	16.7 (62.1)	10.5 (50.9)	5.3 (41.5)	13.9 (57.0)
Mean daily minimum °C (°F)	0.1 (32.2)	−0.1 (31.8)	2.4 (36.3)	7.0 (44.6)	12.7 (54.9)	17.7 (63.9)	21.8 (71.2)	23.3 (73.9)	19.0 (66.2)	12.8 (55.0)	6.9 (44.4)	2.4 (36.3)	10.5 (50.9)
Mean minimum °C (°F)	−2.7 (27.1)	−3.4 (25.9)	−1.5 (29.3)	1.9 (35.4)	7.6 (45.7)	13.3 (55.9)	18.2 (64.8)	19.2 (66.6)	13.8 (56.8)	7.4 (45.3)	1.8 (35.2)	−0.9 (30.4)	−3.6 (25.5)
Record low °C (°F)	−11.7 (10.9)	−13.0 (8.6)	−6.4 (20.5)	−2.5 (27.5)	2.0 (35.6)	6.7 (44.1)	11.4 (52.5)	14.5 (58.1)	7.9 (46.2)	3.0 (37.4)	−1.8 (28.8)	−9.5 (14.9)	−13.0 (8.6)
Average precipitation mm (inches)	180.9 (7.12)	115.8 (4.56)	112.0 (4.41)	97.2 (3.83)	94.4 (3.72)	121.1 (4.77)	222.3 (8.75)	163.4 (6.43)	151.9 (5.98)	157.7 (6.21)	203.5 (8.01)	225.9 (8.89)	1,845.9 (72.67)
Average snowfall cm (inches)	63 (25)	48 (19)	8 (3.1)	0 (0)	0 (0)	0 (0)	0 (0)	0 (0)	0 (0)	0 (0)	0 (0)	19 (7.5)	139 (55)
Average extreme snow depth cm (inches)	23 (9.1)	23 (9.1)	5 (2.0)	0 (0)	0 (0)	0 (0)	0 (0)	0 (0)	0 (0)	0 (0)	0 (0)	8 (3.1)	32 (13)
Average precipitation days (≥ 0.5 mm)	23.3	19.0	17.4	13.3	11.3	10.6	13.6	10.9	13.5	15.2	19.2	24.1	191.4
Average relative humidity (%)	72	74	68	66	69	74	79	75	73	72	74	74	72
Mean monthly sunshine hours	56.4	74.3	136.8	177.7	202.8	179.2	162.1	205.2	156.2	138.2	91.5	62.9	1,639.6
Source: Japan Meteorological Agency

Climate data for Niitsu, Niigata, elevation 3 m (9.8 ft), (1991−2020 normals, extremes 1976−present)
Month	Jan	Feb	Mar	Apr	May	Jun	Jul	Aug	Sep	Oct	Nov	Dec	Year
Record high °C (°F)	15.4 (59.7)	20.6 (69.1)	25.0 (77.0)	30.8 (87.4)	33.8 (92.8)	36.2 (97.2)	38.1 (100.6)	39.4 (102.9)	37.2 (99.0)	32.4 (90.3)	25.9 (78.6)	20.0 (68.0)	39.4 (102.9)
Mean daily maximum °C (°F)	4.7 (40.5)	5.5 (41.9)	10.0 (50.0)	16.6 (61.9)	22.3 (72.1)	25.7 (78.3)	29.2 (84.6)	31.1 (88.0)	27.0 (80.6)	20.9 (69.6)	14.1 (57.4)	7.8 (46.0)	17.9 (64.2)
Daily mean °C (°F)	1.7 (35.1)	1.8 (35.2)	5.1 (41.2)	10.8 (51.4)	16.8 (62.2)	20.8 (69.4)	24.4 (75.9)	25.7 (78.3)	21.8 (71.2)	15.7 (60.3)	9.5 (49.1)	4.4 (39.9)	13.2 (55.8)
Mean daily minimum °C (°F)	−1.3 (29.7)	−1.8 (28.8)	0.5 (32.9)	5.0 (41.0)	12.1 (53.8)	16.8 (62.2)	20.8 (69.4)	21.7 (71.1)	17.6 (63.7)	10.9 (51.6)	5.1 (41.2)	1.1 (34.0)	9.1 (48.4)
Record low °C (°F)	−15.1 (4.8)	−12.6 (9.3)	−13.2 (8.2)	−2.6 (27.3)	2.8 (37.0)	9.2 (48.6)	13.5 (56.3)	13.1 (55.6)	8.2 (46.8)	1.0 (33.8)	−3.6 (25.5)	−11.1 (12.0)	−15.1 (4.8)
Average precipitation mm (inches)	189.0 (7.44)	120.9 (4.76)	109.9 (4.33)	95.4 (3.76)	90.5 (3.56)	123.8 (4.87)	225.6 (8.88)	159.8 (6.29)	148.1 (5.83)	151.8 (5.98)	216.0 (8.50)	246.3 (9.70)	1,877.1 (73.90)
Average snowfall cm (inches)	104 (41)	86 (34)	22 (8.7)	0 (0)	0 (0)	0 (0)	0 (0)	0 (0)	0 (0)	0 (0)	0 (0)	38 (15)	249 (98)
Mean monthly sunshine hours	53.7	74.5	123.2	169.5	199.3	167.4	153.7	199.7	145.8	133.2	89.9	57.6	1,564
Source: Japan Meteorological Agency

Climate data for Nishikan-ku, (Note: location in former Maki town) elevation 2 m (6.6 ft), (1991−2020 normals, extremes 1976−present)
Month	Jan	Feb	Mar	Apr	May	Jun	Jul	Aug	Sep	Oct	Nov	Dec	Year
Record high °C (°F)	14.8 (58.6)	21.6 (70.9)	23.7 (74.7)	29.4 (84.9)	32.2 (90.0)	33.7 (92.7)	36.9 (98.4)	38.9 (102.0)	38.6 (101.5)	32.4 (90.3)	26.5 (79.7)	18.9 (66.0)	38.9 (102.0)
Mean daily maximum °C (°F)	5.2 (41.4)	5.9 (42.6)	9.9 (49.8)	16.0 (60.8)	21.4 (70.5)	24.8 (76.6)	28.3 (82.9)	30.2 (86.4)	26.4 (79.5)	20.4 (68.7)	14.2 (57.6)	8.2 (46.8)	17.6 (63.6)
Daily mean °C (°F)	2.1 (35.8)	2.2 (36.0)	5.3 (41.5)	10.7 (51.3)	16.4 (61.5)	20.4 (68.7)	24.3 (75.7)	25.6 (78.1)	21.6 (70.9)	15.6 (60.1)	9.7 (49.5)	4.6 (40.3)	13.2 (55.8)
Mean daily minimum °C (°F)	−0.7 (30.7)	−1.1 (30.0)	1.0 (33.8)	5.6 (42.1)	12.1 (53.8)	16.8 (62.2)	21.0 (69.8)	21.9 (71.4)	17.7 (63.9)	11.2 (52.2)	5.6 (42.1)	1.4 (34.5)	9.4 (48.9)
Record low °C (°F)	−13.1 (8.4)	−12.0 (10.4)	−7.5 (18.5)	−3.2 (26.2)	4.0 (39.2)	8.8 (47.8)	13.4 (56.1)	12.7 (54.9)	7.1 (44.8)	1.8 (35.2)	−5.4 (22.3)	−12.2 (10.0)	−13.1 (8.4)
Average precipitation mm (inches)	165.2 (6.50)	99.8 (3.93)	99.9 (3.93)	90.9 (3.58)	85.2 (3.35)	117.0 (4.61)	213.3 (8.40)	154.2 (6.07)	130.4 (5.13)	136.1 (5.36)	190.2 (7.49)	222.8 (8.77)	1,704.1 (67.09)
Average precipitation days (≥ 1.0 mm)	20.1	16.2	15.9	11.8	10.3	9.9	12.5	10.1	11.7	13.6	17.5	20.6	170.2
Mean monthly sunshine hours	47.9	71.2	129.9	171.5	195.0	174.9	157.8	182.4	139.1	126.0	85.4	49.6	1,530.7
Source: Japan Meteorological Agency

=== Wards ===
Niigata has a system of wards (ku) since April 1, 2007: Each ward has its own "image color".

Wards of Niigata
	Place Name			Map of Niigata
	Rōmaji	Kanji	Color	
1	Akiha Ward	秋葉区	Floral green	A map of Niigata's Wards
2	Chuo Ward (administrative center)	中央区	Waterfront blue	A map of Niigata's Wards
3	Higashi Ward	東区	Aqua blue	A map of Niigata's Wards
4	Kita Ward	北区	Nature green	A map of Niigata's Wards
5	Konan Ward	江南区	Spring green	A map of Niigata's Wards
6	Minami Ward	南区	Breeze blue	A map of Niigata's Wards
7	Nishi Ward	西区	Sunset orange	A map of Niigata's Wards
8	Nishikan Ward	西蒲区	Harvest yellow	A map of Niigata's Wards

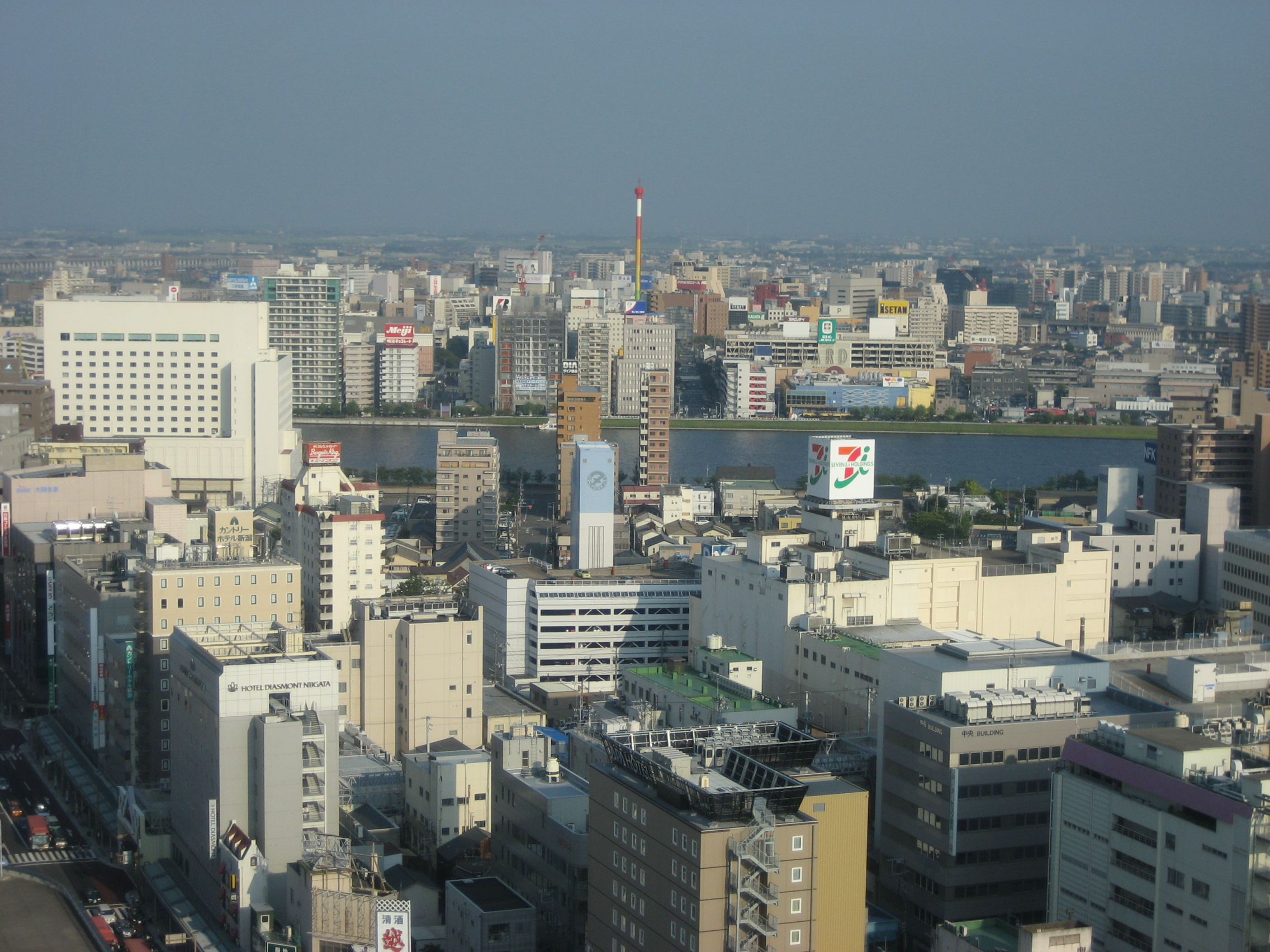
View of Chuo Ward

=== Adjoining communities ===
From the north, following Niigata's border clockwise:

- Seirō, Kitakanbara District
- Shibata
- Agano
- Gosen
- Tagami, Minamikanbara District
- Kamo
- Sanjō
- Tsubame
- Yahiko, Nishikanbara District
- Nagaoka
- In addition Sado Island is connected by sea and air routes.

== History ==
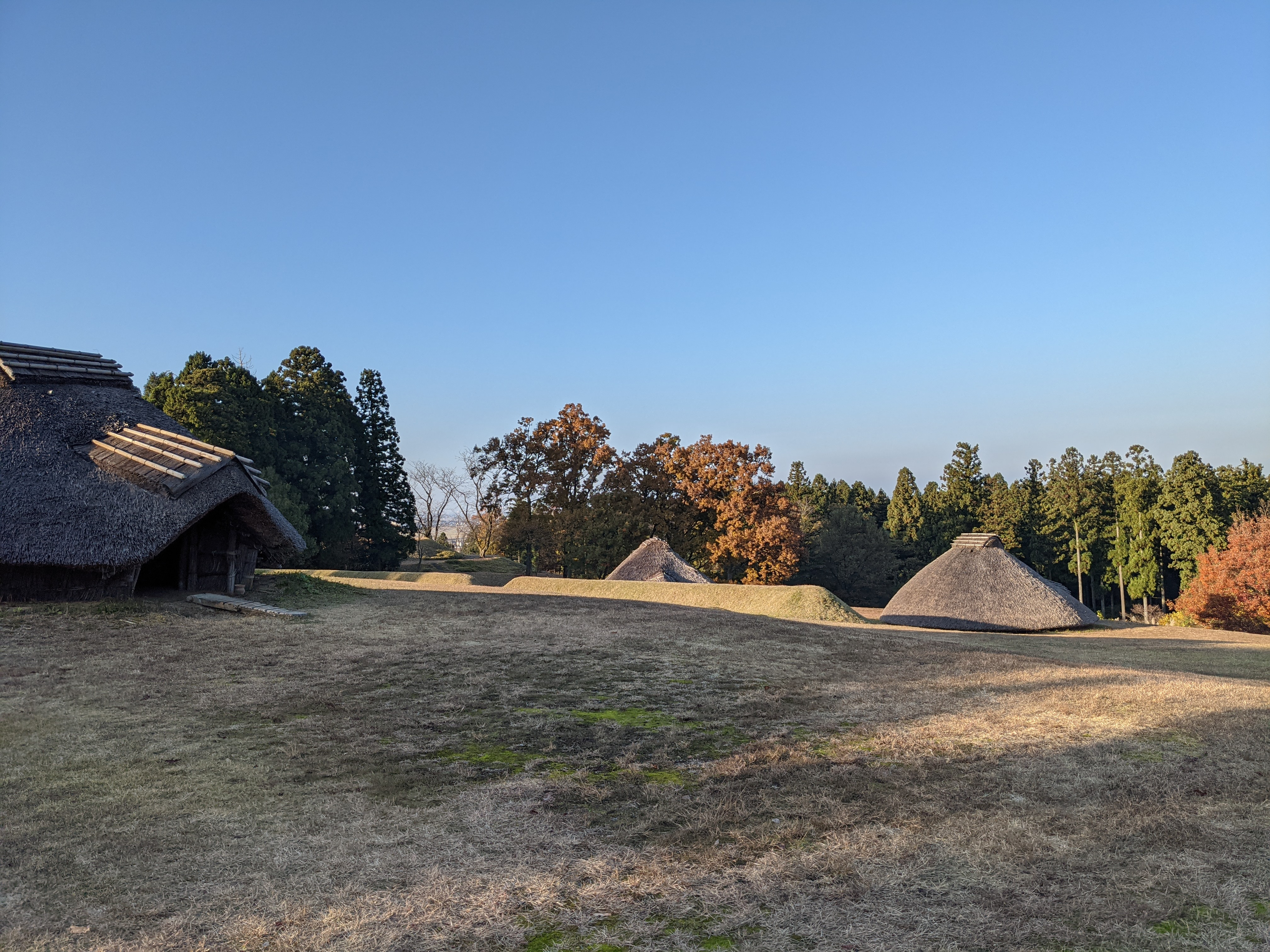
People have inhabited the Niigata area (Furutsu Hachimanyama Site

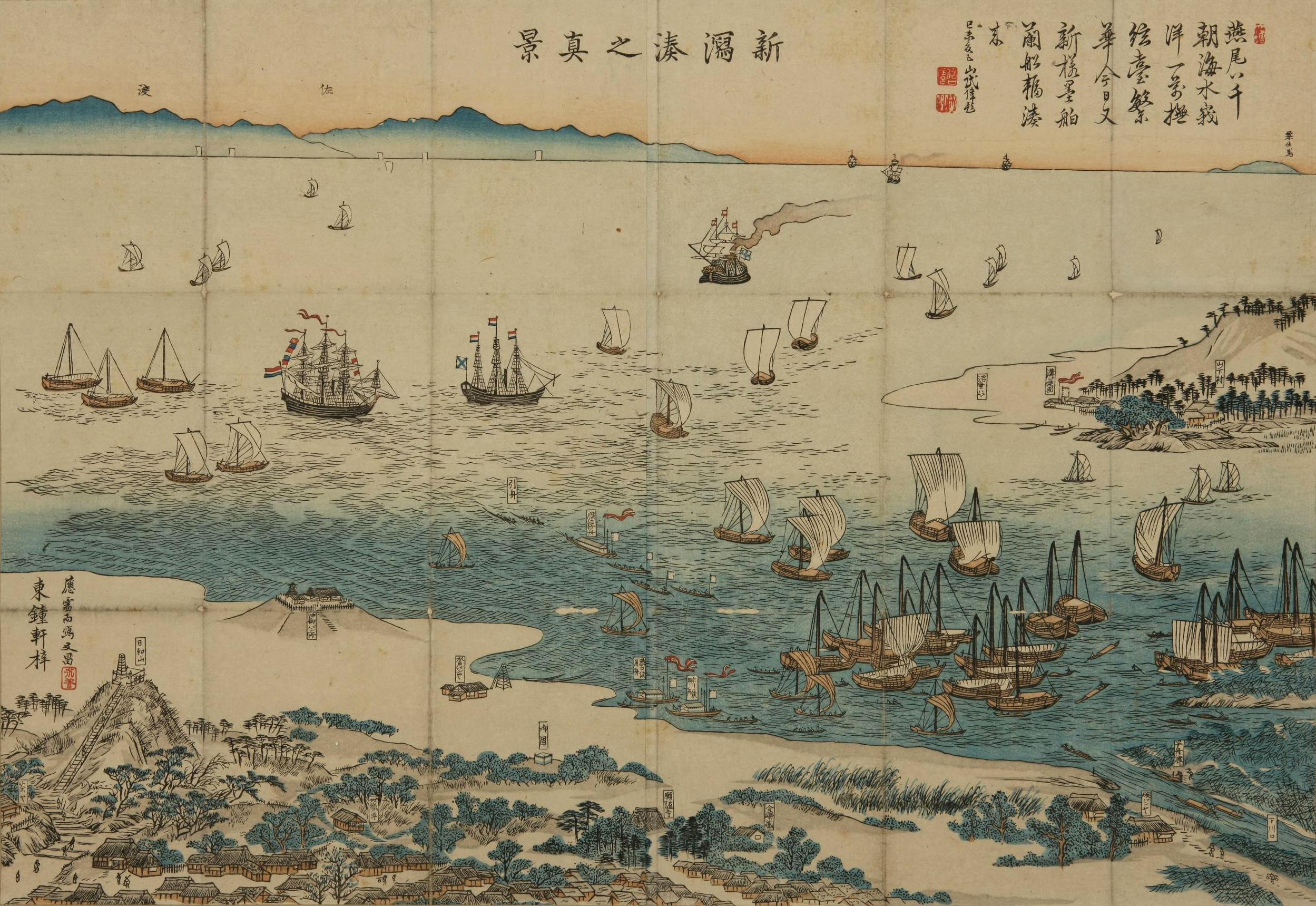
Nishiki-e "Niigata Minato no Shinkei" (View of Niigata Port), 1859

=== Prehistoric and ancient ===
People have inhabited the Niigata area since the Jōmon period, though much of the current land was still beneath the sea at the time. According to the Nihon Shoki, a fortress was built in the area in AD 647, and artifacts have been found at the Furutsu Hachimanyama Site. As rice cultivation emerged during the Yayoi period, the area began its transformation into a vital agricultural hub. Over the centuries, the location of the city along the fertile Echigo Plain allowed the settlement to become one of Japan’s leading rice-producing regions, laying the foundation for Niigata’s enduring reputation as the “rice capital” of the country.

=== Early modern ages ===
In the 16th century, a port called Niigata was established at the mouth of the Shinano River, while a port town with the name Nuttari developed at the mouth of the Agano River. In 1598, Uesugi Kagekatsu was ordered by Toyotomi Hideyoshi to be transferred to Aizu (Fukushima Prefecture), with Niigata Port coming under the control of the Nagaoka Domain and Numatari Port coming under the control of the Shibata Domain. A system of canals was constructed throughout the downtown area of Niigata port in the 17th century. During this period, the courses of the Shinano and Agano rivers gradually changed until they poured into the Sea of Japan at the same location. As a result, Niigata prospered as a port town, serving as a port of call for Japanese trade ships traversing the Sea of Japan.

The Matsugasaki Canal was constructed in 1730 to drain the Agano River area, but in 1731, flooding destroyed the canal and caused it to become the main current of the Agano River. As a result, the volume of water flowing into the port of Niigata decreased, which in turn allowed land reclamation efforts and the development of new rice fields to proceed.

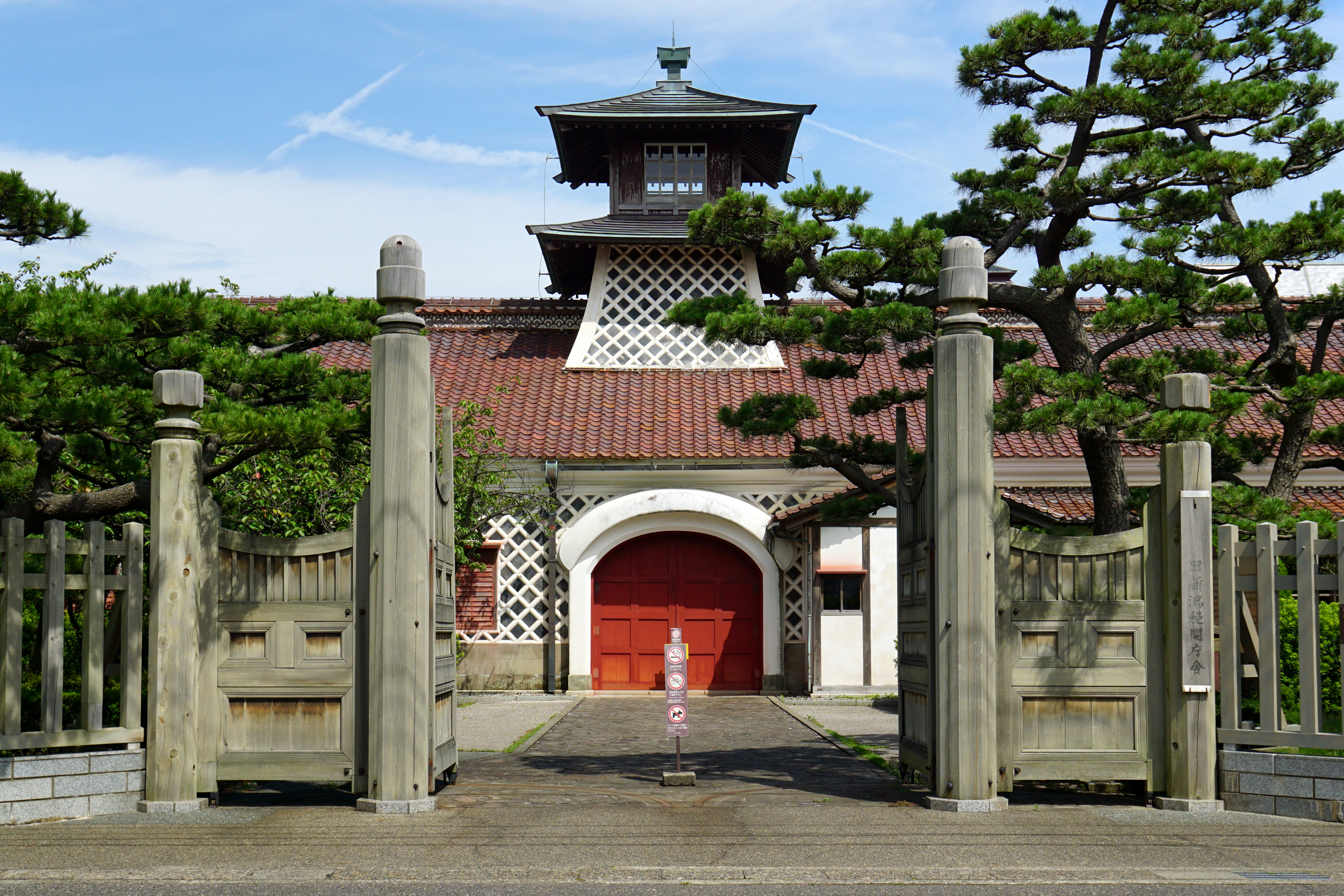
Old Niigata Customs House

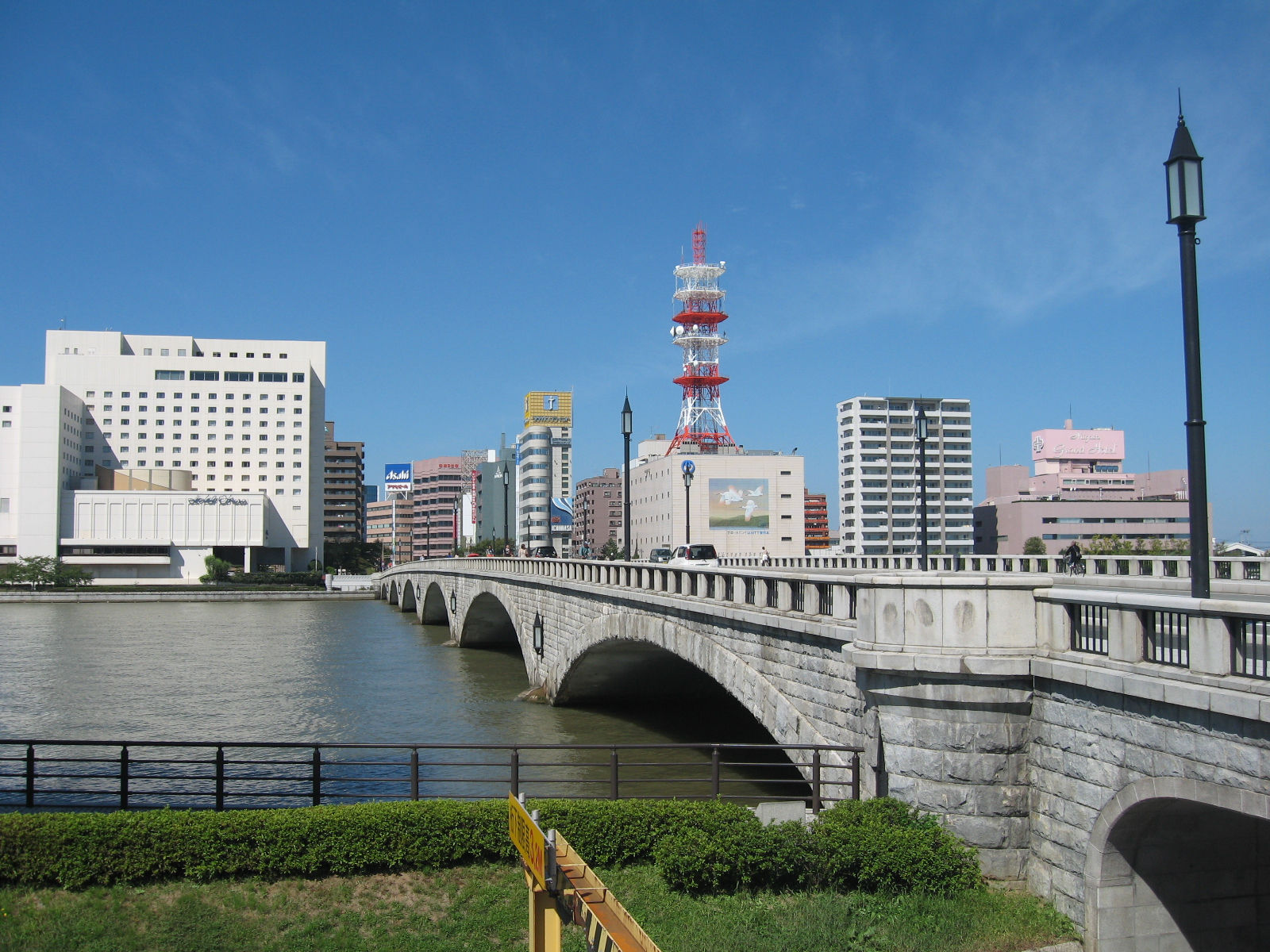
Bandai Bridge

=== Late modern ages ===
In 1858, Niigata was designated as one of the five ports to be opened for international trade in the Japan–U.S. Treaty of Amity and Commerce. However, the shallow water level in the port delayed the actual opening to foreign ships until 1869. The port also served as a valuable base for fishermen who roamed as far north as the Kamchatka Peninsula to catch salmon and other fish. Niigata Town incorporated Yorii Village in 1879 to become Niigata Ward, and in 1889, Niigata Ward and Sekiya Village merged to become Niigata City. In the 1890s, mechanical drilling of the Niitsu oil field began in earnest, and during the Taisho period, Nuttari flourished as an "oil town", allowing nearby Niigata became the largest oil producing region in the country. In 1886, the first Bandai Bridge was built across the Shinano River to connect the settlements of Niigata on the west and Nuttari on the east, eventually leading to the annexation of Nuttari in 1914.

=== 1942–1945 ===
During World War II, Niigata's strategic location between the capital of Tokyo and the Sea of Japan made it a key point for the transfer of settlers and military personnel to the Asian continent, including Manchukuo. The region also housed multiple prisoner-of-war (POW) camps such as Niigata Camp 15B, where Allied prisoners were forced to work in various industries. By 1945, Niigata was one of four cities, together with Hiroshima, Kokura, and Nagasaki, selected as potential targets for the atomic bombs if Japan did not surrender, and as a result, remained one of the only major cities not firebombed during the war. However, due to reasons including poor weather conditions, its distance from B-29 bases in the Mariana Islands, and other factors, Niigata was struck off the atomic target list. On August 11, 1945, after the second atomic bombing in Nagasaki, the governor of Niigata Prefecture ordered the people to evacuate as concerns of an impending bombing heightened, and the city was completely deserted for days until the war ended.

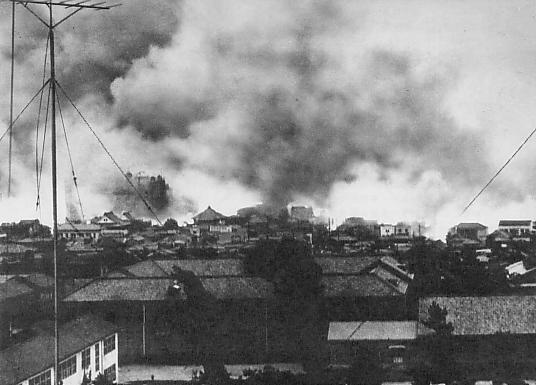
The 1955 Great Fire of Niigata

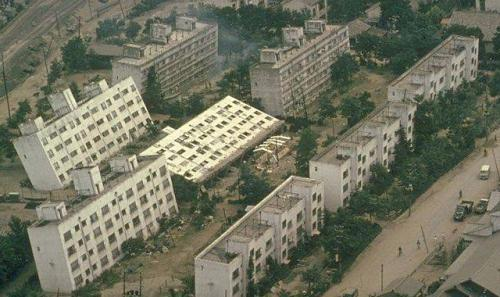
Some effects of liquefaction during the 1964 Niigata earthquake

=== 1945–1972 ===
After the war, Niigata had a relatively intact infrastructure compared to other areas, allowing its oil refining industry to recover and exceed pre-war capacity by 1950. A devastating Typhoon Louise and fire in 1955 destroyed much of the downtown area, but eventually the city recovered. In 1958, construction of the relocated Niigata Station was completed, extending the downtown area from Bandai Bridge. The Niigata Thermal Power Station Unit 1 started operation in July 1963. At that time, it was Japan's first power plant capable of using a mixture of natural gas and heavy oil. In 1964, the old canals that flowed throughout the old downtown area were filled in to make way for more roads and due to sanitation concerns. The flow through the canals had decreased over the years and the rate at which waste was carried out through them was not fast enough. In addition, they became mosquito breeding grounds during the summer.

On June 16, 1964, at 13:01 Japan Standard Time an earthquake of 7.5 Richter scale struck the city. The tremor, now widely referred to as the 1964 Niigata earthquake, killed 29 people and left hundreds injured, while subsequently causing catastrophic destruction across the region. In total, 1,960 buildings were completely destroyed, 6,640 were partially destroyed, and another 15,298 suffered severe flooding and damage as a result of widespread soil liquefaction. Recovery from the earthquake focused on addressing widespread liquefaction, and further Engineering efforts led to the development and implementation of ground improvement techniques such as ground treatments and structural reinforcements.

In 1965, the Agano River running through Niigata was polluted with methylmercury from the chemical plant of the Showa Electrical Company. Over 690 people exhibited symptoms of Minamata disease and the outbreak became known as Niigata Minamata disease.

Following the introduction and extension of the Joetsu Shinkansen, Shinkansen service line began between Niigata and Omiya, with service to Tokyo added in 1985. Subsequent upgrades to the line, including the extension of service to Tokyo Station in 1991 and the introduction of faster train models, further strengthened Niigata’s role as a regional hub.

Big Swan Stadium in Niigata City hosted three games during the 2002 FIFA World Cup.

The size and the population of Niigata city increased over the four-year period between 2001 and 2005, due to a series of municipal mergers. On April 1, 2007, Niigata City became first city on the west coast of Honshu to become a government-designated city.

In July 2007, the Chūetsu offshore earthquake, measuring 6.9 on Richter scale, rocked Niigata Prefecture. Though the earthquake was felt in the city, there was little damage, which allowed Niigata City to provide aid to the devastated areas.

In May 2008, the city hosted the 2008 G8 Labor Ministers Meeting.

On March 12, 2011, several hours after the massive 9.0 Tohoku earthquake struck off the east coast of Honshu, Niigata and Nagano Prefectures experienced an estimated magnitude 6.6 earthquake.

=== Mergers ===
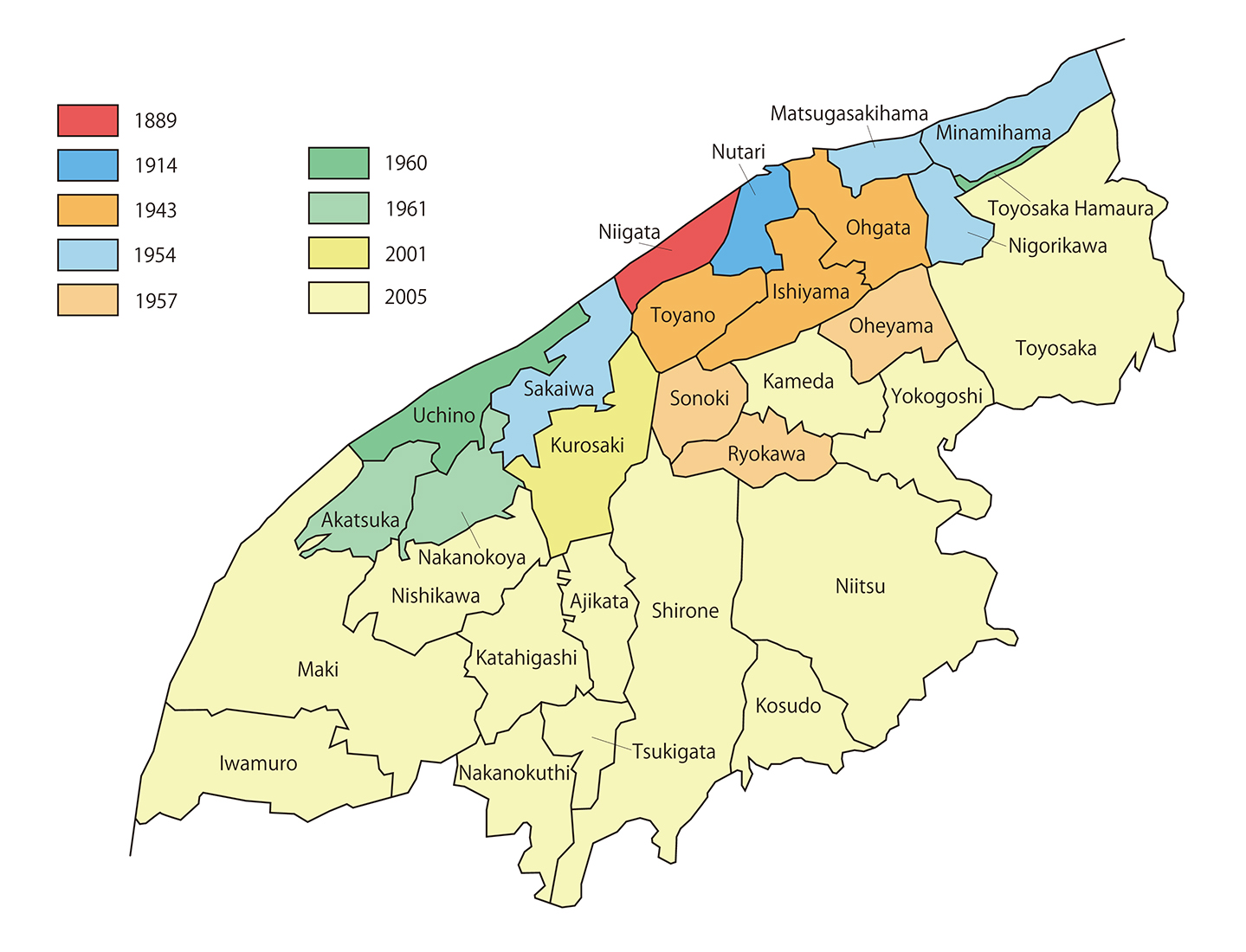
Mergers of Niigata

- On April 1, 1889 - The village of Sekiya was merged into the town of Niigata to become the city of Niigata.
- On April 1, 1914 - The town of Nuttari (from Nakakanbara District) was merged into the city of Niigata.
- On June 1, 1943 - The village of Ohgata (from Nakakanbara District) was merged into the city of Niigata.
- On December 8, 1943 - The villages of Ishiyama and Toyano (both from Nakakanbara District) were merged into the city of Niigata.
- On April 5, 1954 - The village of Matsugasakihama (from Kitakanbara District) was merged into the city of Niigata.
- On November 1, 1954 - The villages of Nigorikawa and Minamihama (both from Kitakanbara District) and the village of Sakaiwa (from Nishikanbara District) were merged into the city of Niigata.
- On May 3, 1957 - The villages of Ryokawa, Sonoki and Oheyama (all from Nakakanbara District) were merged into the city of Niigata.
- On January 11, 1960 - The town of Uchino (from Nishikanbara District) was merged into the city of Niigata.
- On April 1, 1960 - The Hamaura hamlet of the town of Toyosaka (from Kitakanbara District) was merged into the city of Niigata.
- On June 1, 1961 - The villages of Nakanokoya and Akatsuka (both from Nishikanbara District) were merged into the city of Niigata.
- On January 1, 2001 - The town of Kurosaki (from Nishikanbara District) was merged into the city of Niigata.
- On March 21, 2005 - The cities of Niitsu, Shirone and Toyosaka, the towns of Kameda, Kosudo and Yokogoshi (all from Nakakanbara District), the town of Nishikawa, and the villages of Ajikata, Iwamuro, Katahigashi, Nakanokuchi and Tsukigata (all from Nishikanbara District) were all merged into the expanded city of Niigata.
- On October 10, 2005 - The town of Maki (from Nishikanbara District) was merged into the expanded city of Niigata.

== Government ==
=== City hall ===
List of mayors of Niigata City (1889 to present)

Dates	Mayor
27 May 1889 – 3 June 1891	Komitsu Ogura (小倉幸光)
30 June 1891 – 30 May 1899	Chozo Suzuki (鈴木長蔵)
24 July 1899 – 25 September 1902	Tomonao Yagi (八木朋直)
4 November 1902 – 20 February 1904	Samon Hagino (萩野左門)
27 April 1904 – 9 May 1916	Ryojiro Yoshida (吉田良治郎)
28 December 1916 – 16 January 1919	Itsusaku Sakurai (桜井市作)
22 September 1919 – 10 September 1921	Kenji Watanabe (渡辺兼二)

Dates	Mayor
14 January 1922 – 6 May 1925	Yukijiro Shibasaki (柴崎雪次郎)
26 August 1925 – 25 August 1929; 16 November 1929 – 15 November 1933	Yoshito Nakamura (中村淑人)
30 January 1934 – 24 July 1937	Masae Koyanagi (小柳牧衛)
17 December 1937 – 26 August 1938	Takemi Muramatsu (村松武美)
5 December 1938 – 8 November 1946	Hide Inoue (井上英)
7 April 1947 – 1 May 1959	Saburo Murata (村田三郎)
2 May 1959 – 1 May 1975	Kotaro Watanabe (渡辺浩太郎)

Dates	Mayor
2 May 1975 – 14 December 1982	Kihachiro Kawakami (川上喜八郎)
30 January 1983 – 9 October 1990	Genki Wakasugi (若杉元喜)
18 November 1990 – 17 November 2002	Yoshiaki Hasegawa (長谷川義明)
18 November 2002 – 17 November 2018	Akira Shinoda (篠田昭)
18 November 2018 – present	Yaichi Nakahara (中原八一)

== International relations ==
=== Sister cities ===
Niigata maintains sister city ties with six cities:

City	Country	State	Since
Galveston	United States	Texas	January 28, 1965
Khabarovsk	Russia	Khabarovsk Krai	April 23, 1965
Vladivostok	Russia	Primorsky Krai	February 28, 1991
Birobidzhan	Russia	Jewish Autonomous Oblast	August 6, 1992 (once a sister city of Toyosaka, Niigata assumed the sister city honors in 2005)
Nantes	France	Pays de la Loire	January 31, 2009 (shifted from friendship city since 1999)

=== Friendship cities ===
City	Country	State	since
Harbin	China	Heilongjiang	December 17, 1979

=== Partnership cities ===
In addition, special exchange agreements have been set up with the following:

- Huế, Vietnam
- Kingston upon Hull, United Kingdom
- Ulsan, South Korea (since September 2007)

=== National ===
City	Prefecture	region	Since
Hakodate	Oshima	Hokkaidō region	1993 (Treaty ports Partnership)
Yokohama	Kanagawa	Kantō region	1993 (Treaty ports Partnership)
Kobe	Hyōgo	Kansai region	1993 (Treaty ports Partnership)
Nagasaki	Nagasaki	Kyushu region	1993 (Treaty ports Partnership)
Sado	Niigata	Chūbu region	August 1, 2008
Aizuwakamatsu	Fukushima	Tōhoku region	July 22, 2012
Kyoto	Kyoto	Kansai region	March 26, 2013

== Education ==
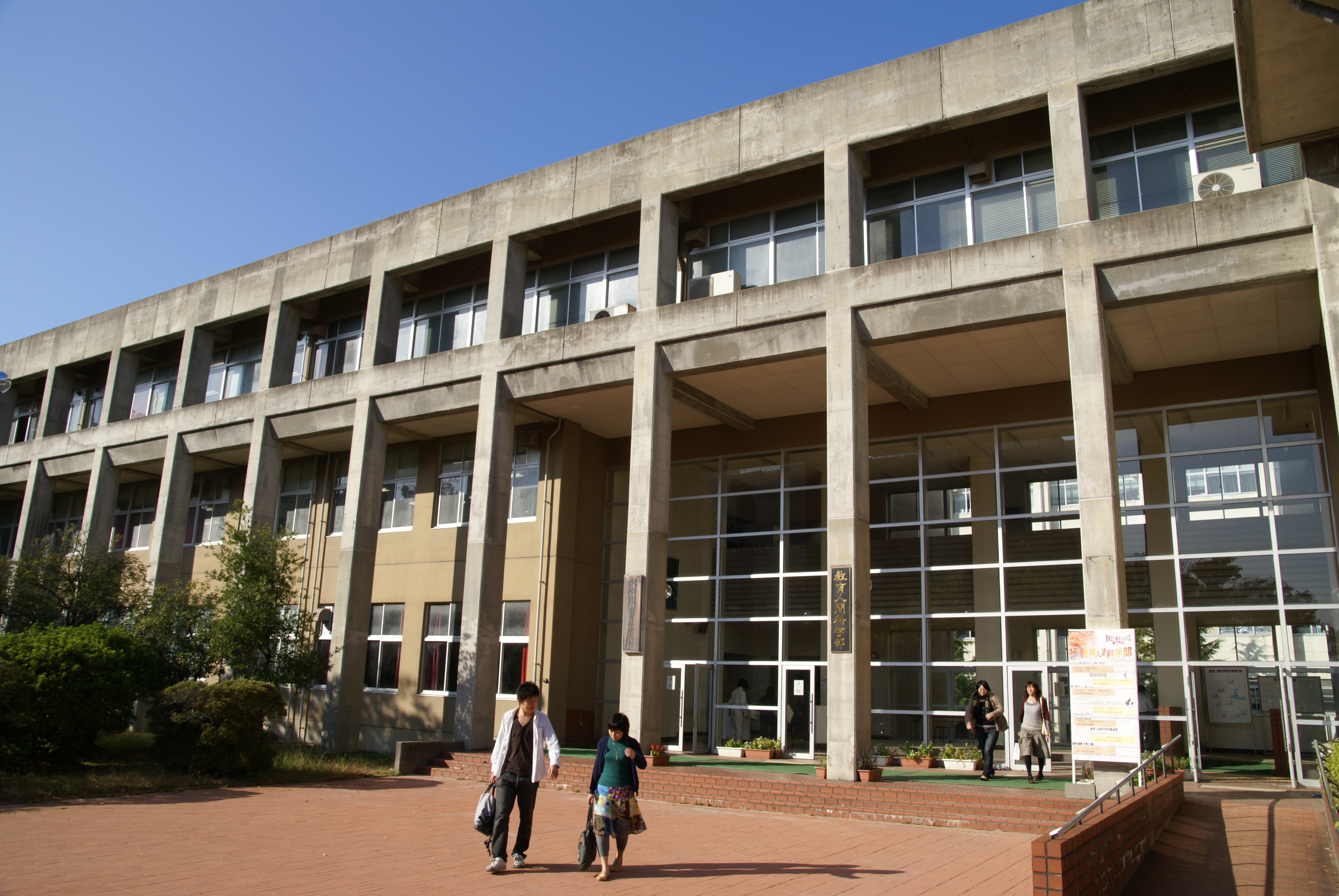
Niigata University

=== Colleges and universities ===
- Niigata University
- University of Niigata Prefecture
- Niigata Seiryo University
- The Nippon Dental University School of Life Dentistry at Niigata
- Niigata University of Pharmacy and Applied Life Sciences
- International University of Japan
- Niigata University of International and Information Studies
- Niigata University of Health and Welfare
- Graduate Institute for Entrepreneurial Studies
- College of Biomedical Technology Niigata University
- Niigata Agro-Food University

== Transportation ==
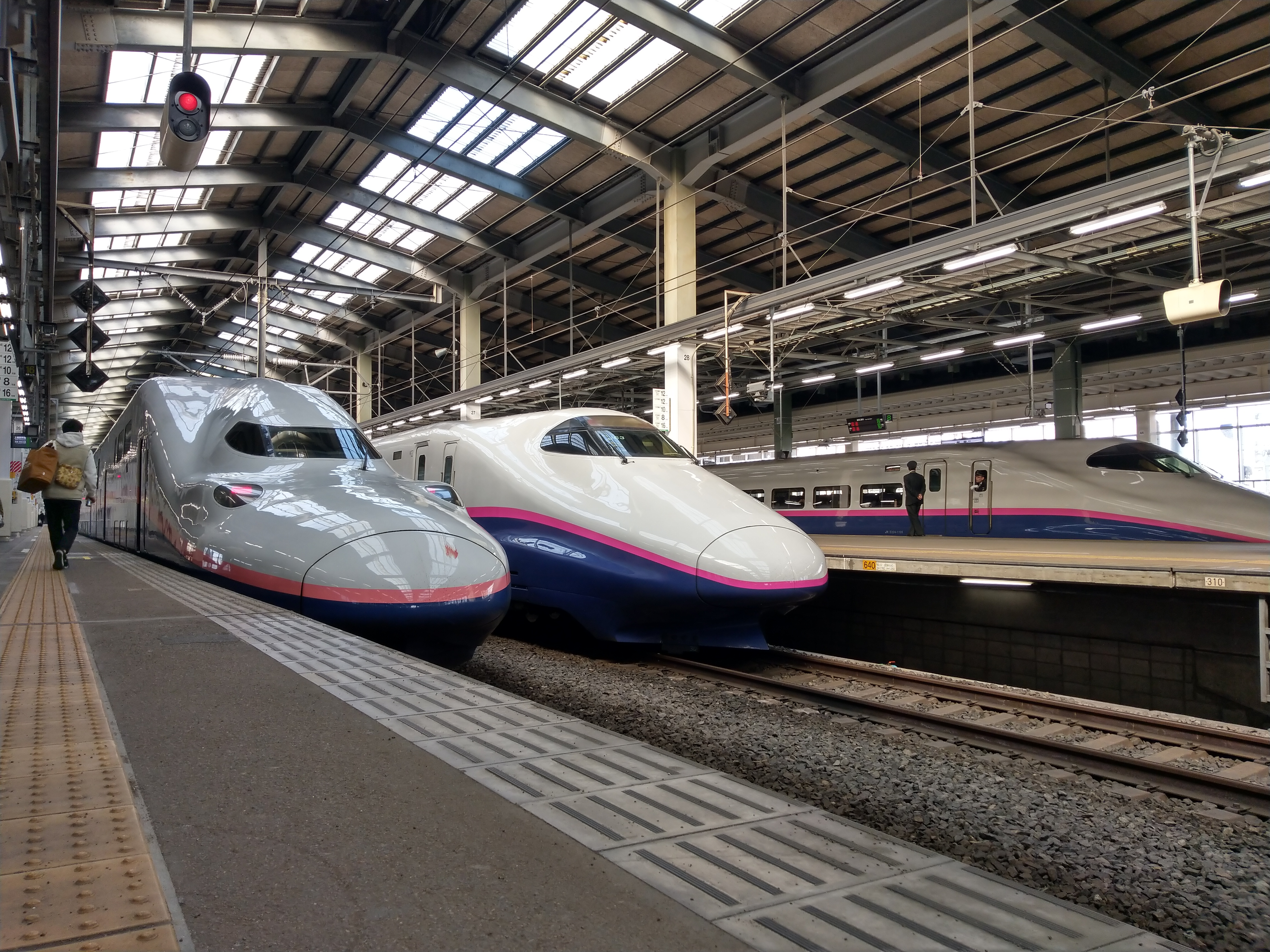
Jōetsu Shinkansen

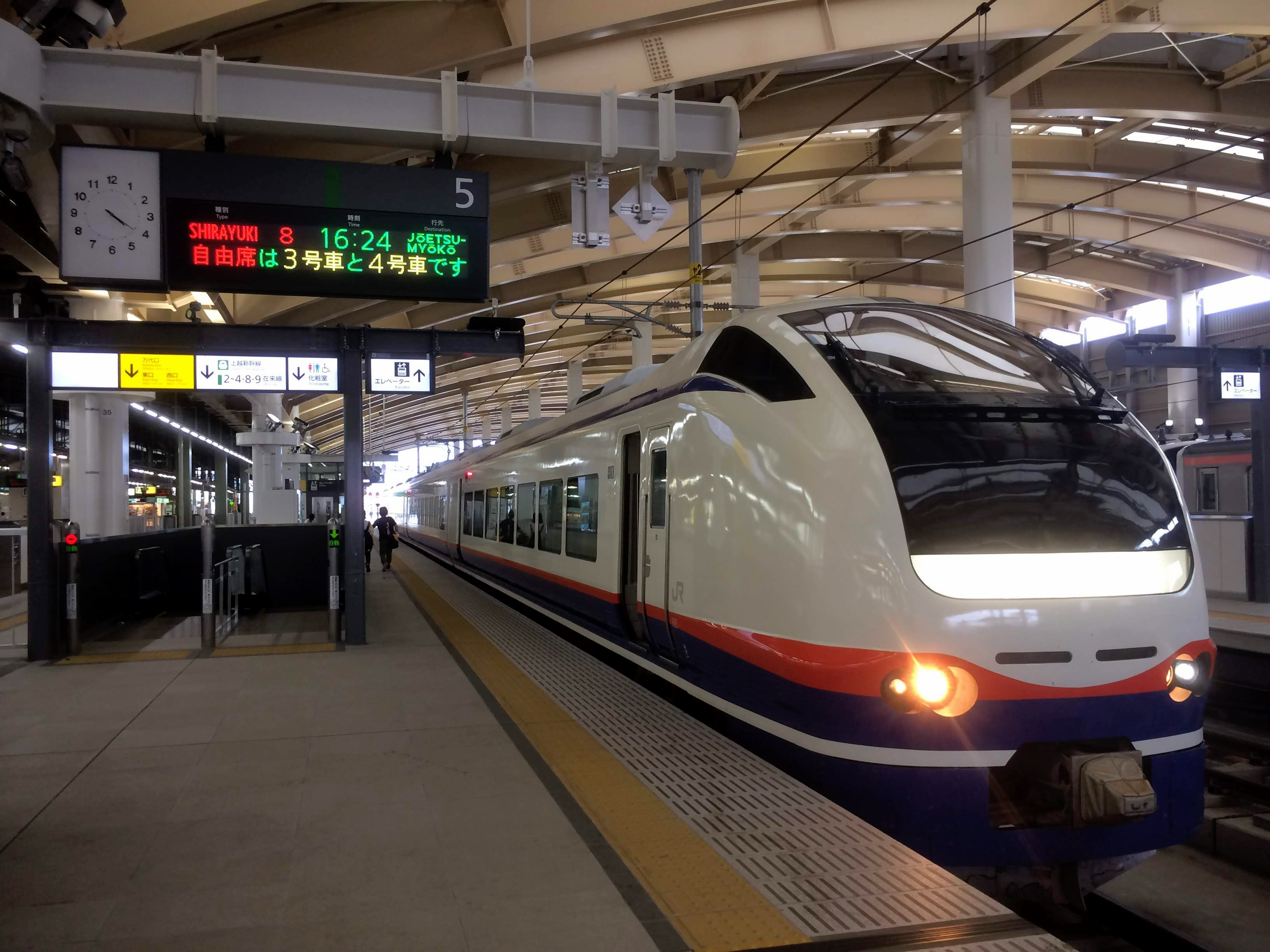
Shinetsu Main Line

Linemap of Shinetsu Main Line Niigata with Stations

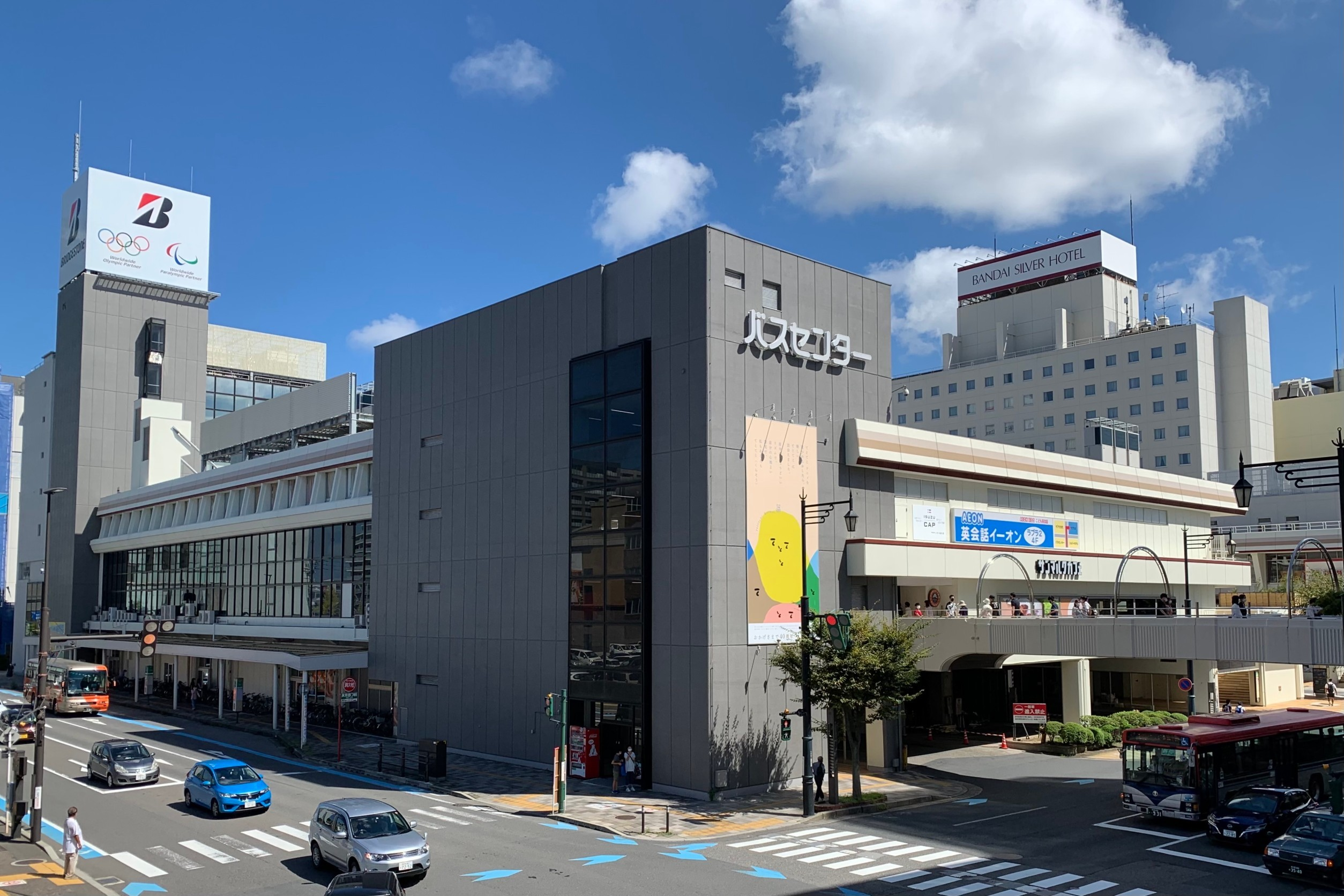
Bandai City Bus Center

Niigata Bypass NetworkMap

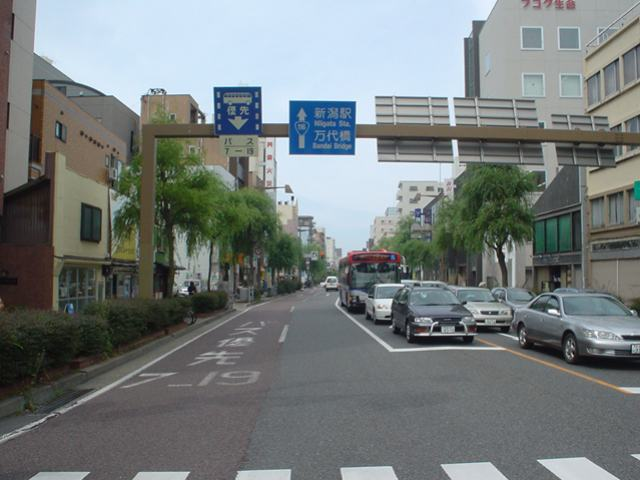
Willow-lined streets of Niigata

=== Airways ===
==== Airport ====
Niigata Airport is located about 6 km north of central Niigata. It handles some international destinations as well as many domestic ones. As of October 2016, the domestic destinations available are Osaka (10 times a day), Sapporo (five or six times a day), Fukuoka (three times a day), Okinawa (once or twice a day), Nagoya (three times a day), Narita (once a day) and Sado Island (three times a day).

Niigata Airport's international destinations are Harbin (twice a week), Seoul (five times a week), Shanghai (twice a week) and Vladivostok.

=== Railways ===
The largest station in Niigata City is Niigata Station. It is centrally located in the Bandai area, one of the two main shopping districts in downtown Niigata. Approximately 37,000 passengers use the station daily. The Jōetsu Shinkansen, which terminates at Niigata Station, provides daily service to Tokyo. The Shin'etsu Main Line, Hakushin Line, Echigo Line, Uetsu Main Line, and Ban'etsu West Line also terminate at Niigata Station. These lines serve Myoko, Itoigawa, Akita, Sakata, and Aizuwakamatsu.

Niigata Kotsu Dentetsu Line and Kambara Dentetsu trains used to run through the city until the late 1990s; however, they no longer exist.

==== High-speed rail ====
East Japan Railway Company (JR East)

- Jōetsu Shinkansen: - Niigata

==== Conventional lines ====
East Japan Railway Company (JR East)

- Shin'etsu Main Line: Niigata - Echigo-Ishiyama - Kameda - Ogikawa - Satsukino - Niitsu - Furutsu - Yashiroda
- Hakushin Line: Niigata - Higashi-Niigata - Ōgata - Niizaki - Hayadōri - Toyosaka - Kuroyama
- Echigo Line: Niigata - Kamitokoro - Hakusan - Sekiya - Aoyama - Kobari - Terao - Niigata University - Uchino - Uchino-Nishigaoka - Echigo-Akatsuka - Echigo-Sone - Maki - Iwamuro - Yoshida

=== Buses ===
==== Transit bus ====
BRT "Bandai-bashi Line" runs through business/shopping districts in the central Niigata (Niigata Station - Bandai Bridge - Furumachi - City hall - Hakusan Station - Aoyama).

=== Roads ===
==== Expressways ====
- Nihonkai-Tōhoku Expressway
- Hokuriku Expressway
- Ban-etsu Expressway

==== Japan National Route ====
- National Route 7
- National Route 9
- National Route 49
- National Route 113
- National Route 116
- National Route 289
- National Route 345
- National Route 350
- National Route 402
- National Route 403
- National Route 459
- National Route 460

=== Seaways ===
==== Sea port ====
The Port of Niigata served as a part of kitamaebune during Edo era, and became one of the five open ports according to the Treaty of Amity and Commerce (United States–Japan) in 1858. The west district of the port of Niigata provides passenger transportation facilities as well as cargo transportation, while the east district is dedicated for cargo capabilities, including the container terminal facilities. The Port of Niigata is designated as one of the international hub ports by the government.

The destinations of the passenger services available at the port of Niigata include Ryotsu on Sado island, Otaru, Akita, Tsuruga.

Until 2006, Niigata was formerly the terminus of the Mangyongbong-92 ferry, one of the direct connections between Japan and North Korea.

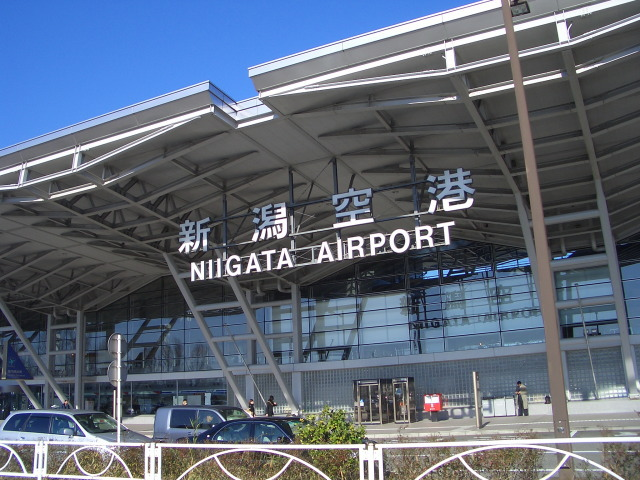
Niigata Airport

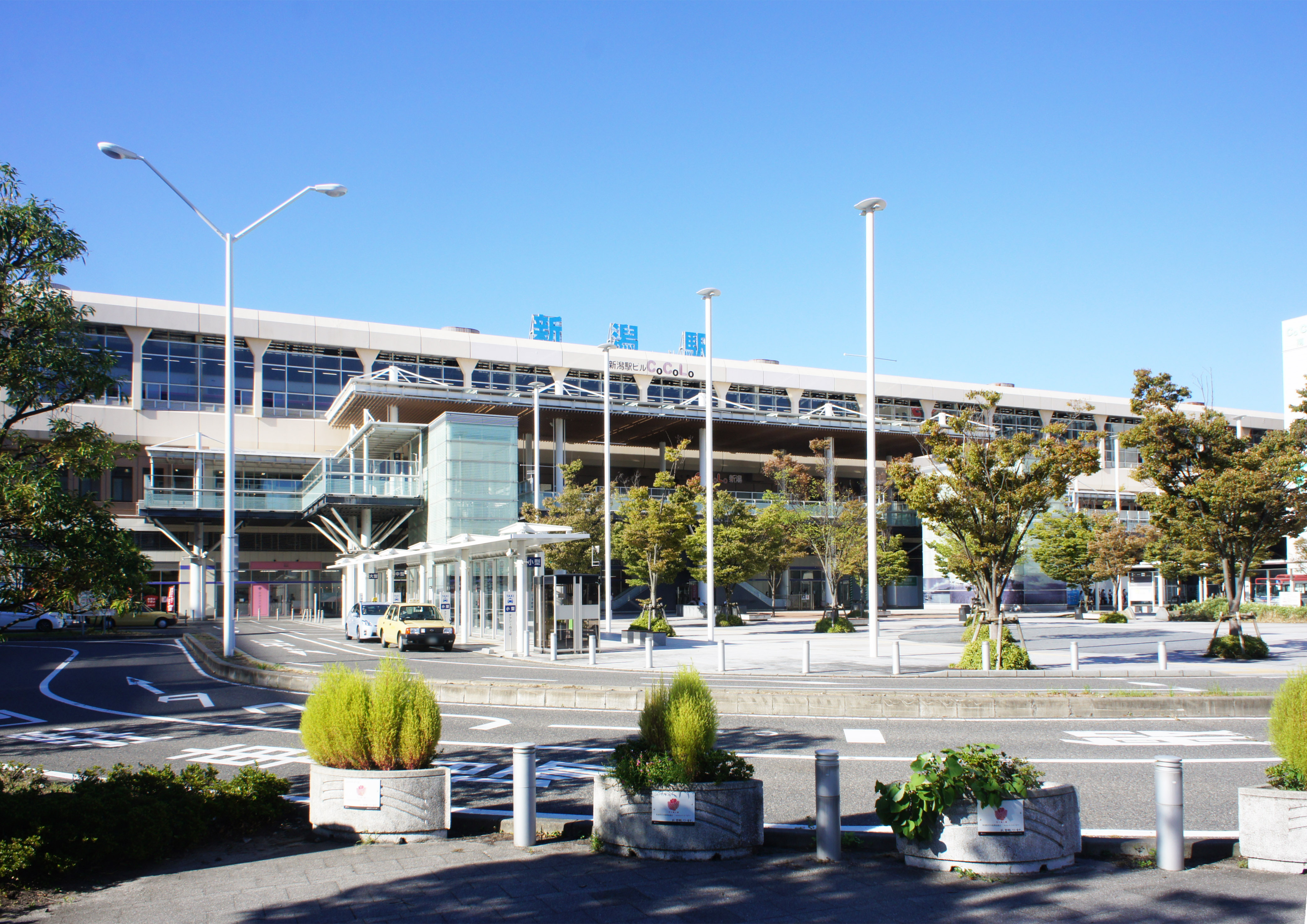
Niigata Station

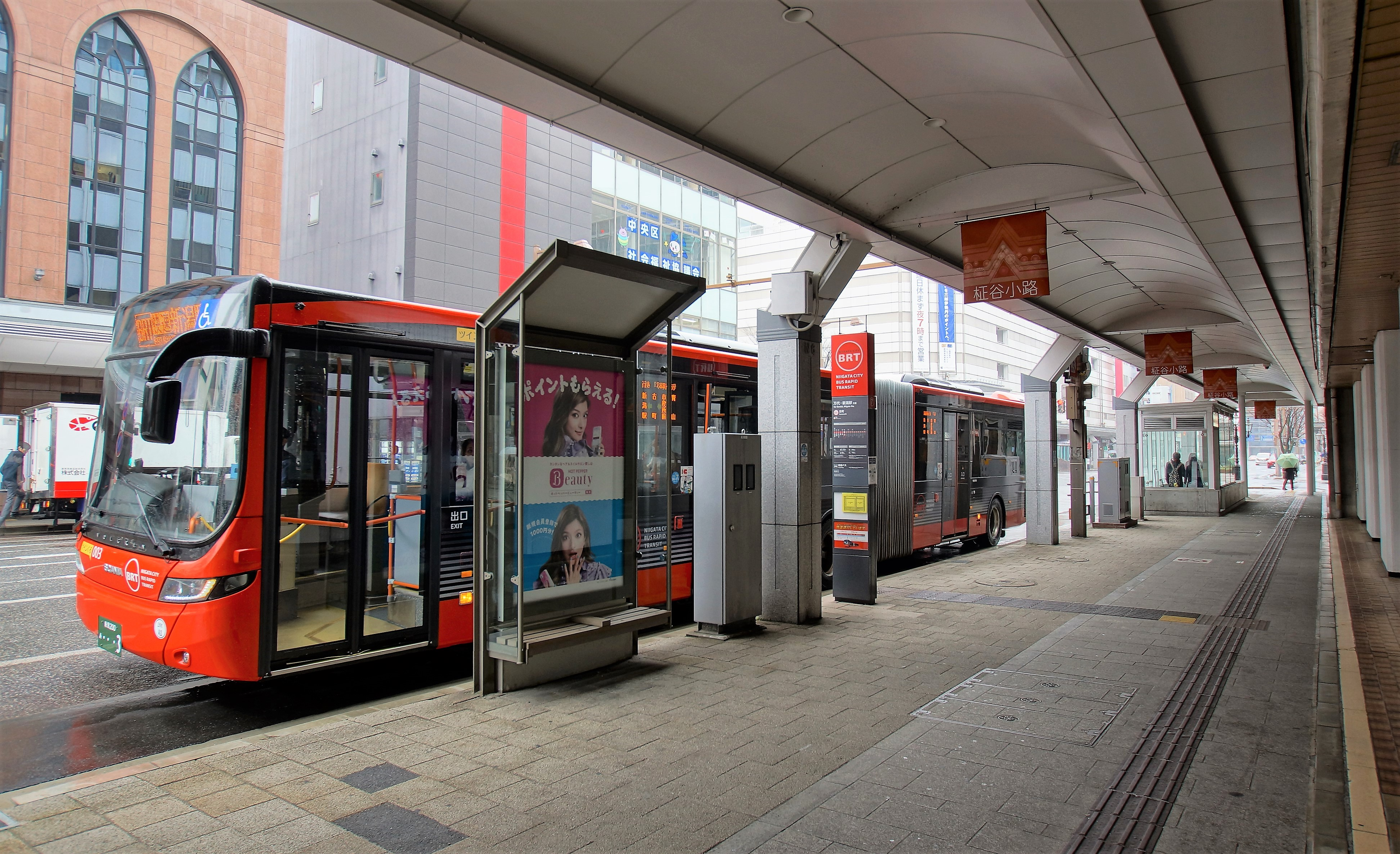
Bandai-bashi Line (BRT)

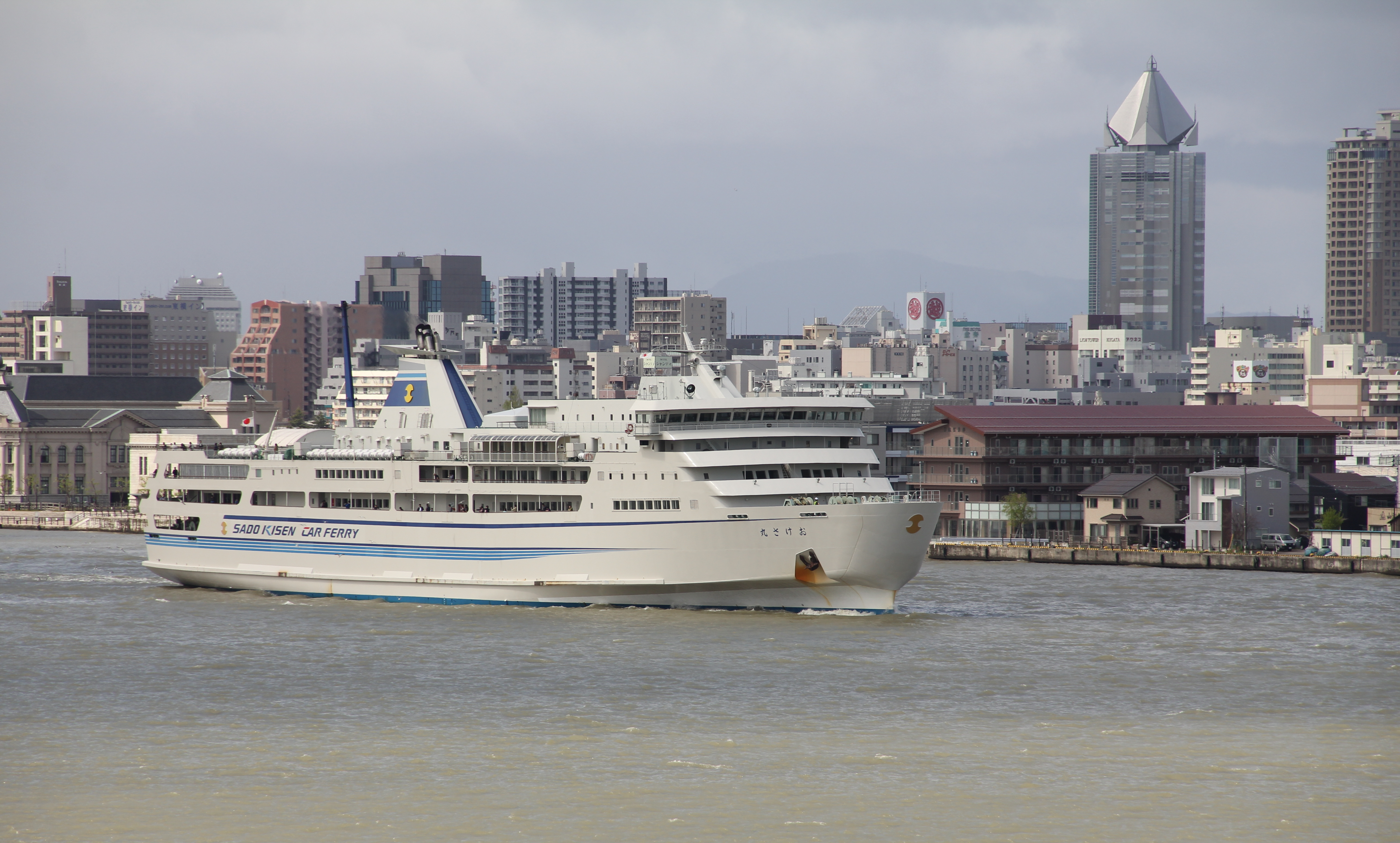
Port of Niigata

== Local attractions ==
- Furumachi, Bandai City - Downtown shopping districts
- Toki Messe, Next21, Niigata Nippo Media Ship, Niigata Prefectural Government Office - skyscrapers with observation decks
- Nuttari Terrace
- Pier Bandai
- Niigata City History Museum (Minatopia)
- Northern Culture Museum
- Marinepia Nihonkai Aquarium
- Fukushimagata Lagoon Park
- Iwamuro Onsen
- Niigata Prefectural Botanical Garden
- Nature Aquarium Gallery
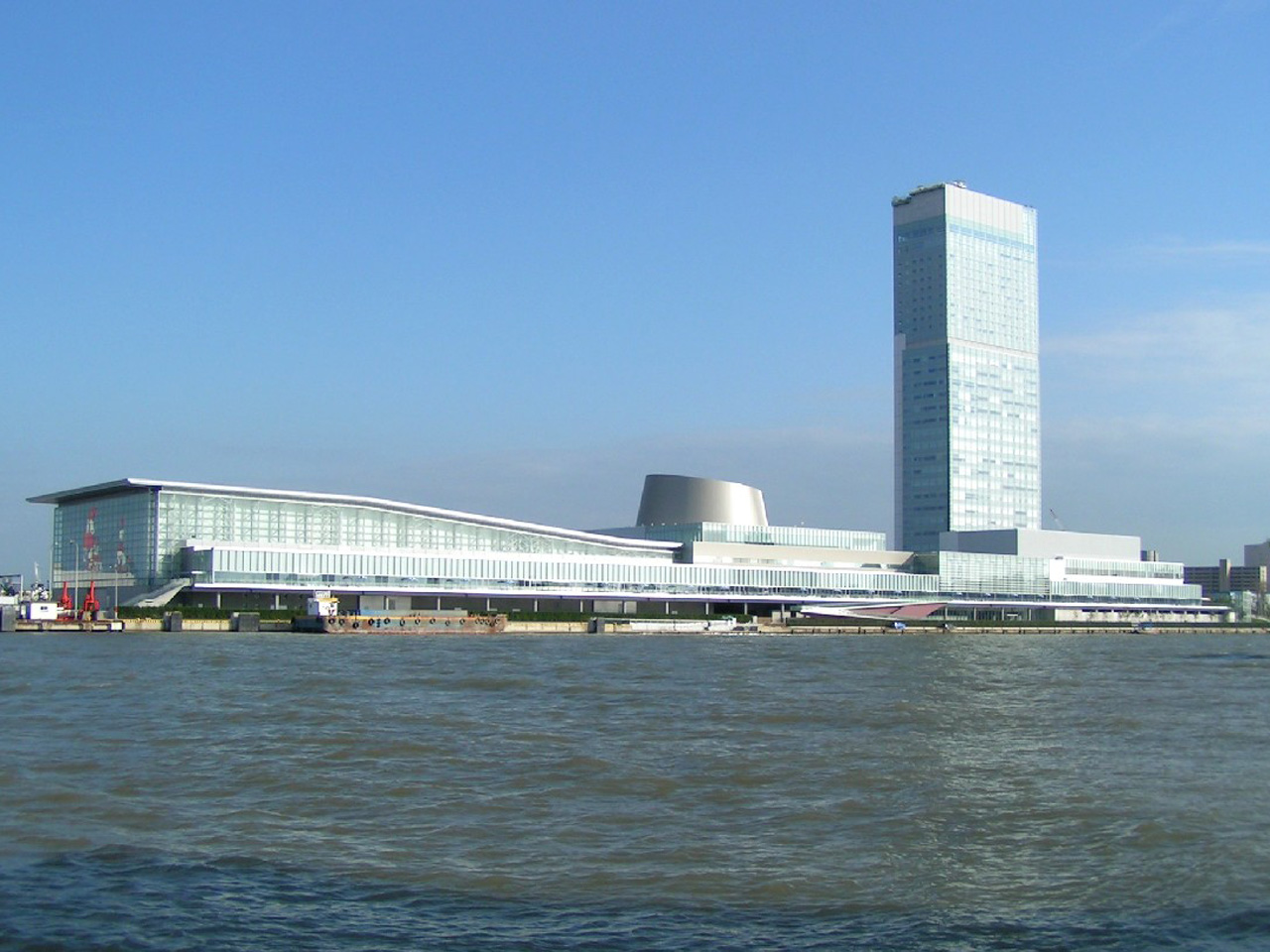
Toki Messe

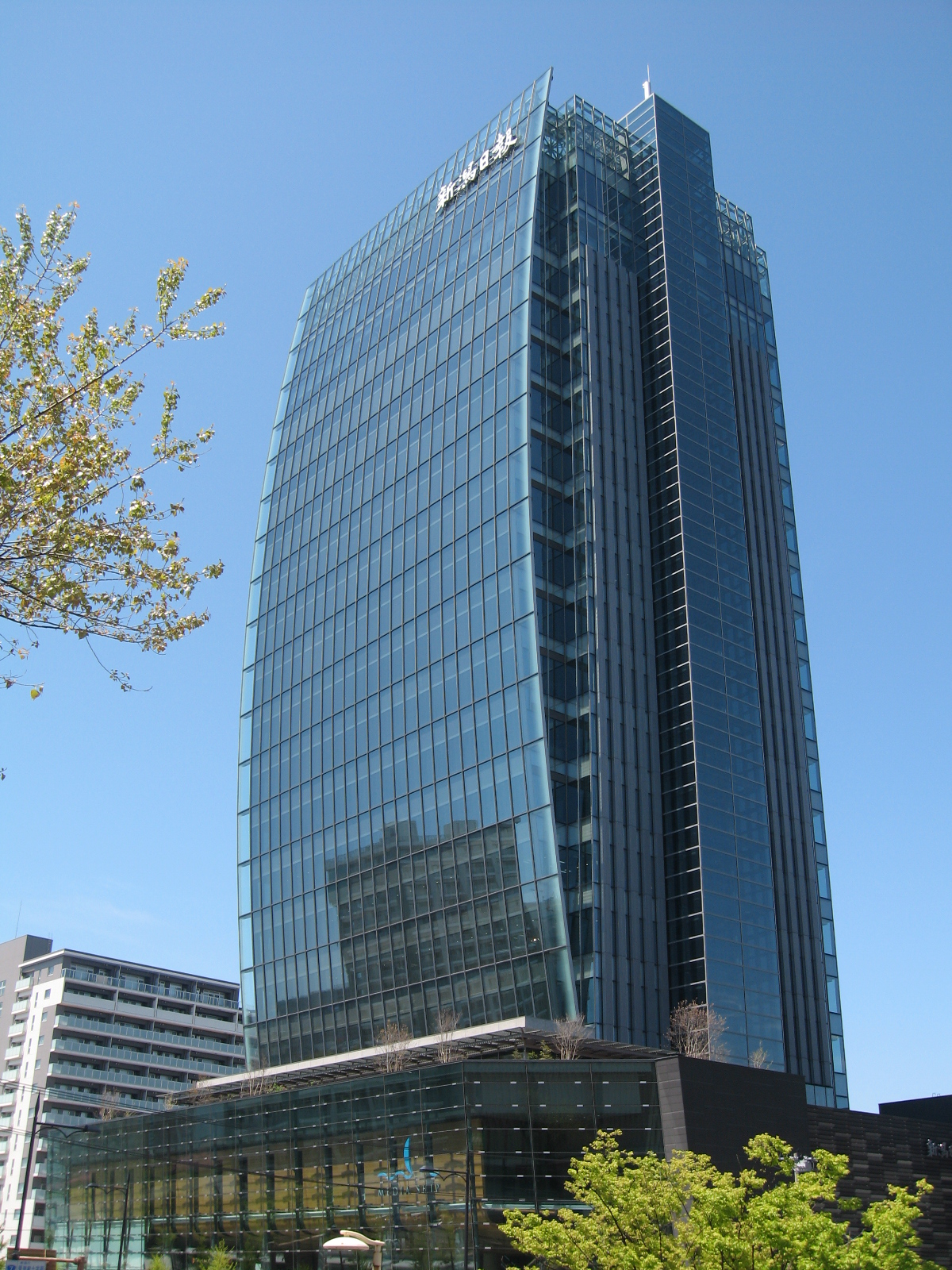
Niigata Nippo Media Ship

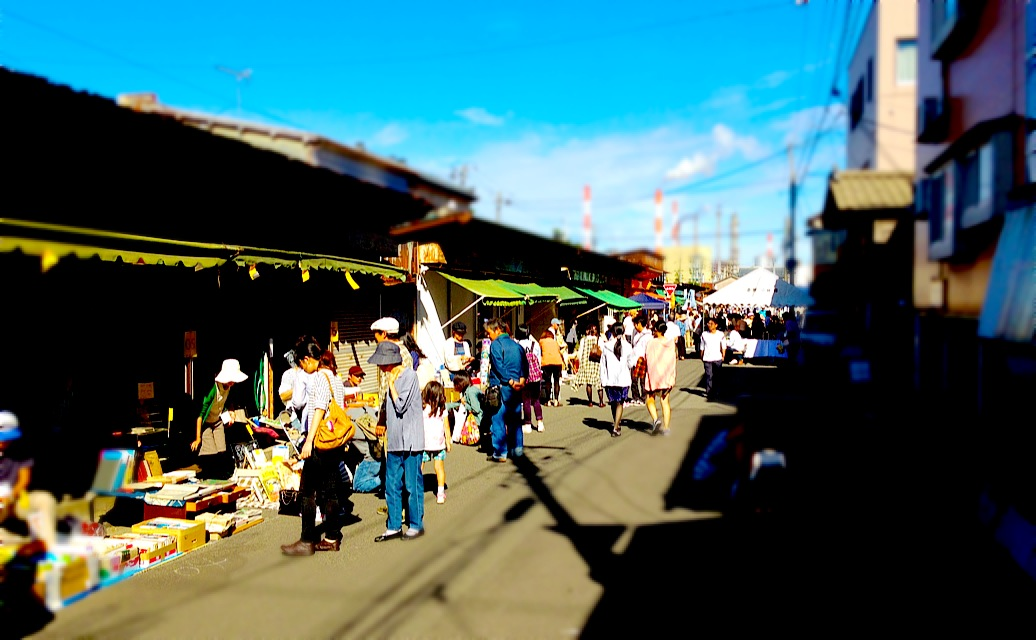
Nuttari Terrace

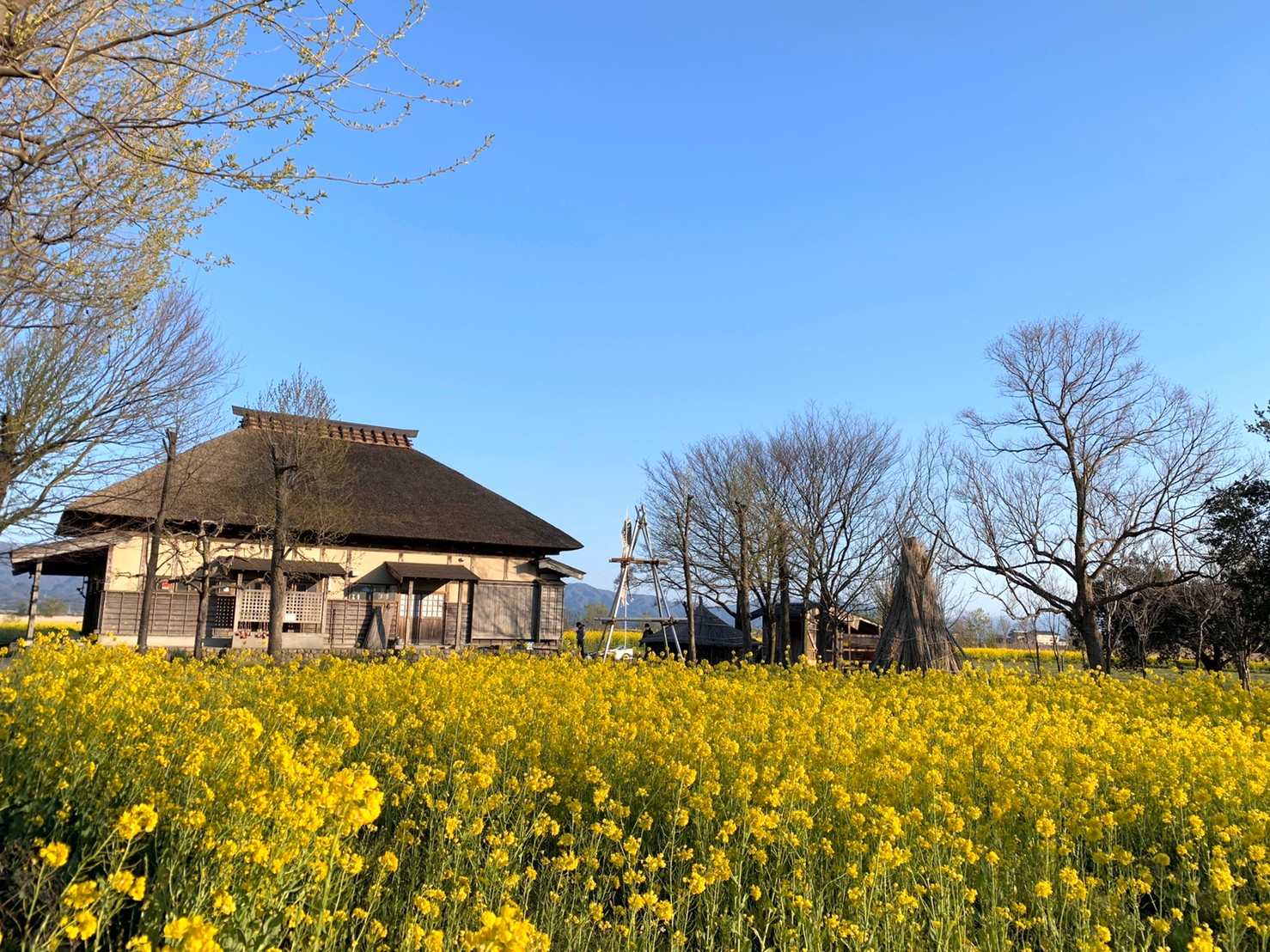
Fukushimagata Lagoon Park

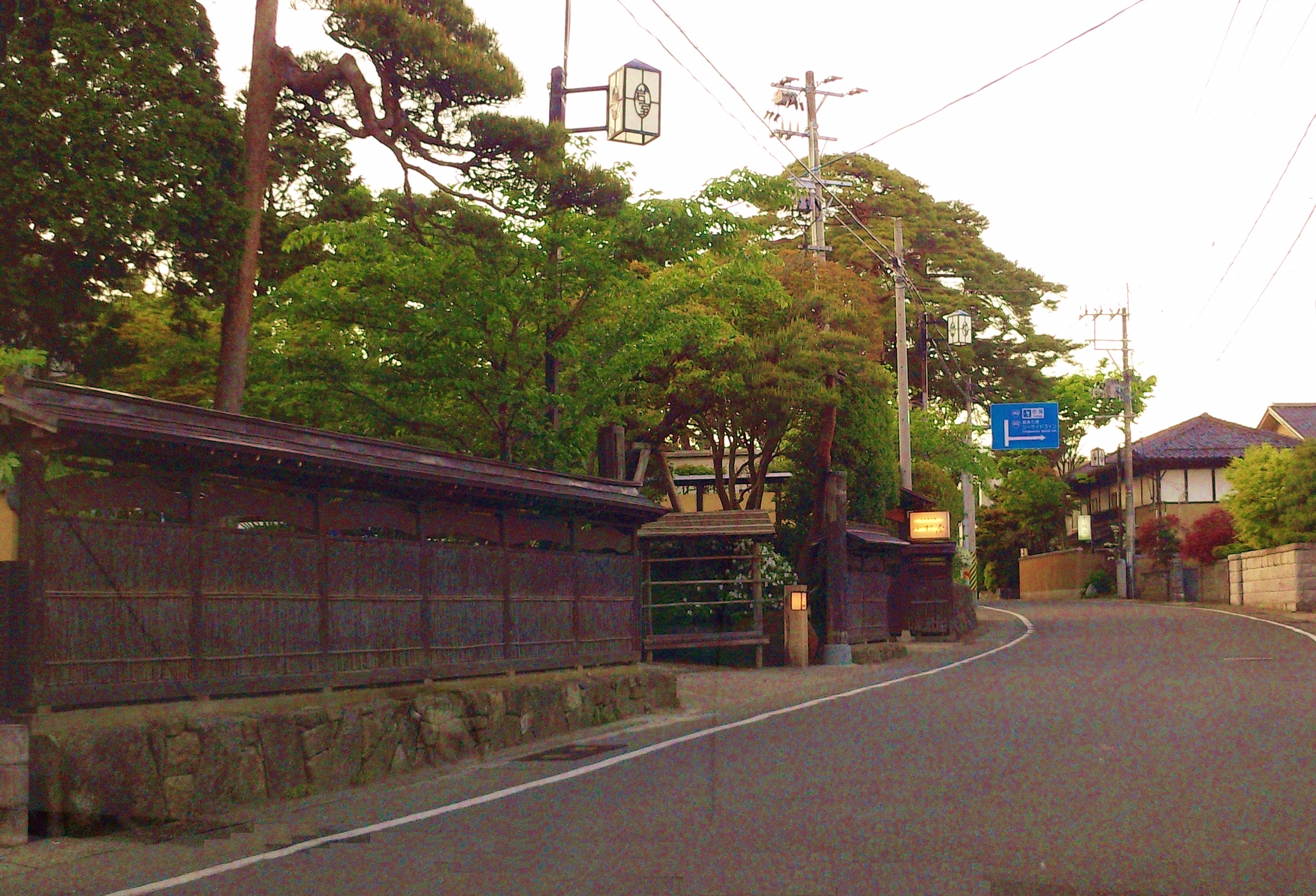
Iwamuro Onsen

== Culture ==
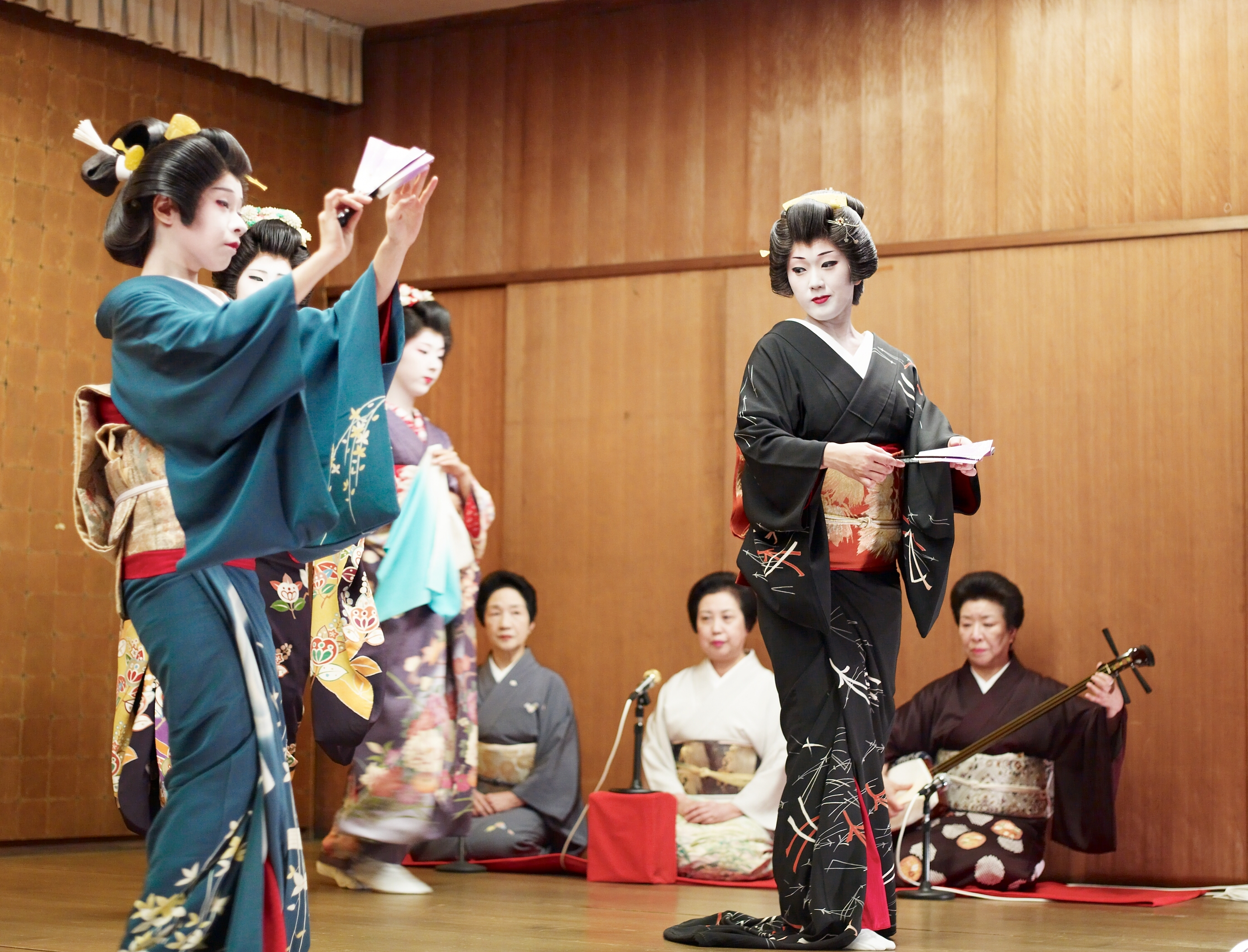
Niigata geigi

Aerial video of Kurosaki Festival Fireworks

Niigata has its own geisha culture since over 200 years ago dating back to the Edo period. This was due to the prosperity of the city as a port town. Locally they are called geigi and the tradition continues on. Most ochaya are located in the Furumachi neighbourhood with well-known places such as the Nabechaya.

=== Events ===
- Niigata Festival (every August)
- Kambara Festival
- Niigata Comic Market
- Niigata Manga Competition
- Kurosaki Festival

=== Foods ===
- Tare Katsudon
- Noppe
- Kakinomoto
- Sasa Dango
- Mikazuki Italian Noodle
- Assari-Shōyu Ramen
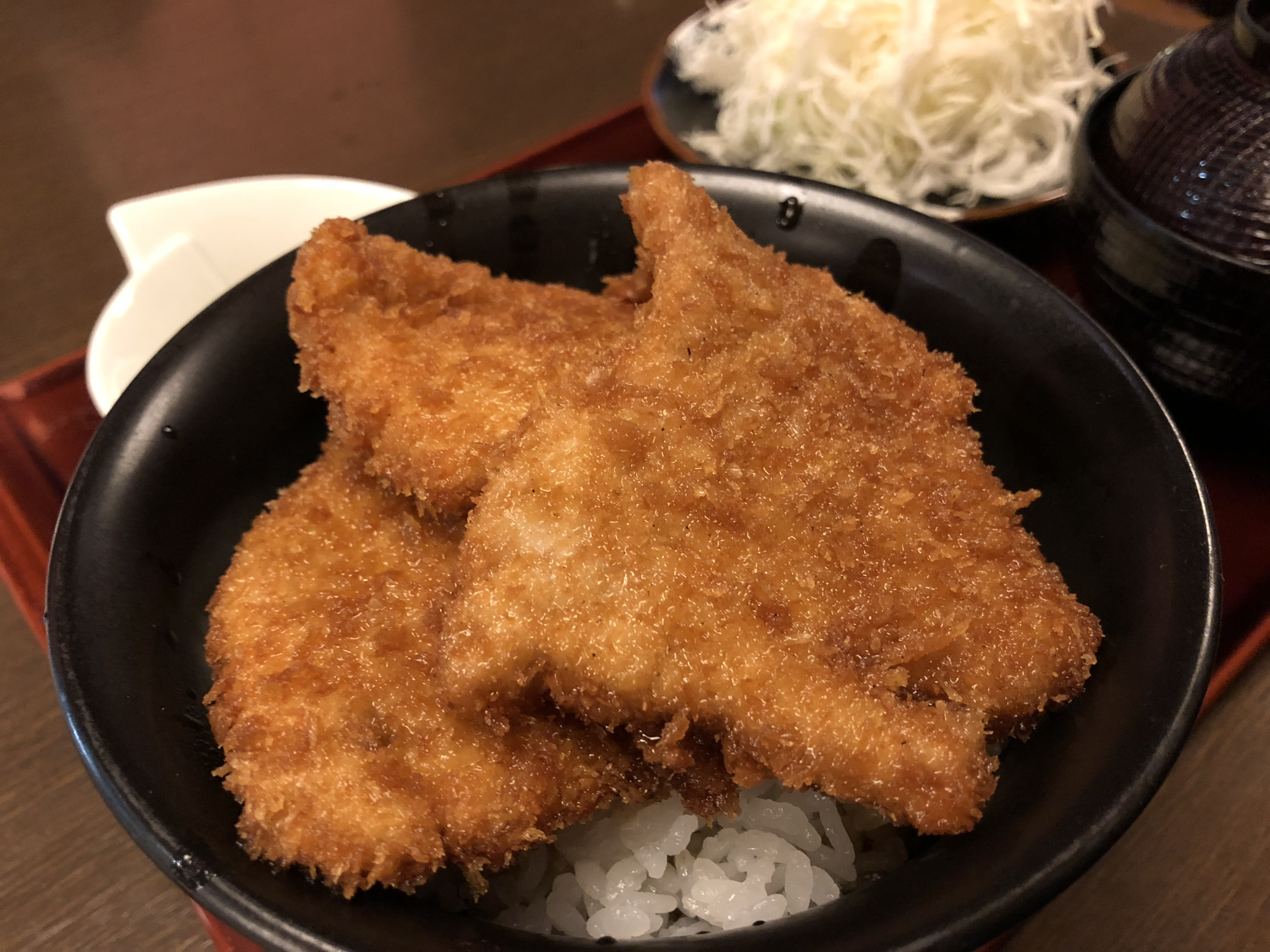
Tare Katsudon

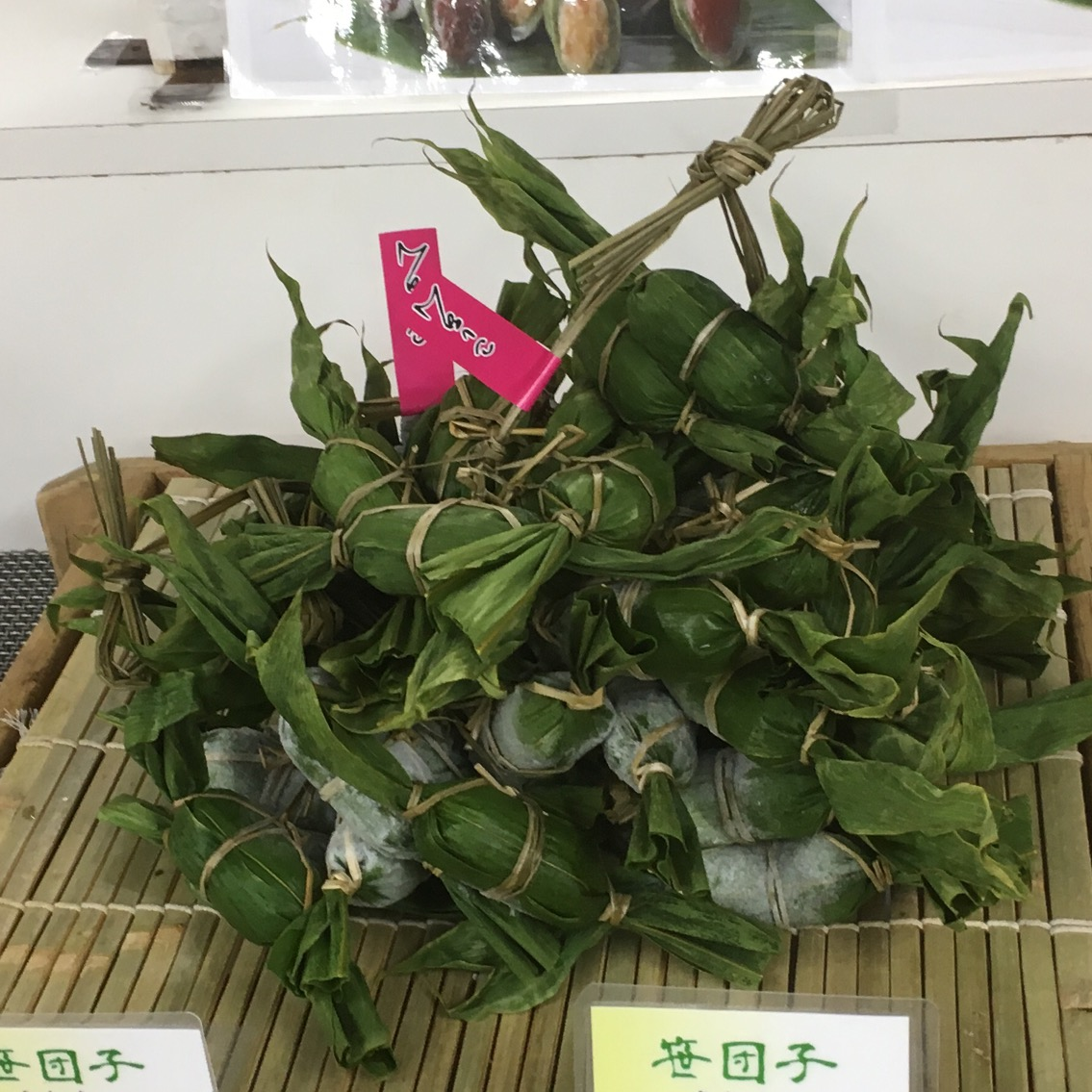
Sasa Dango

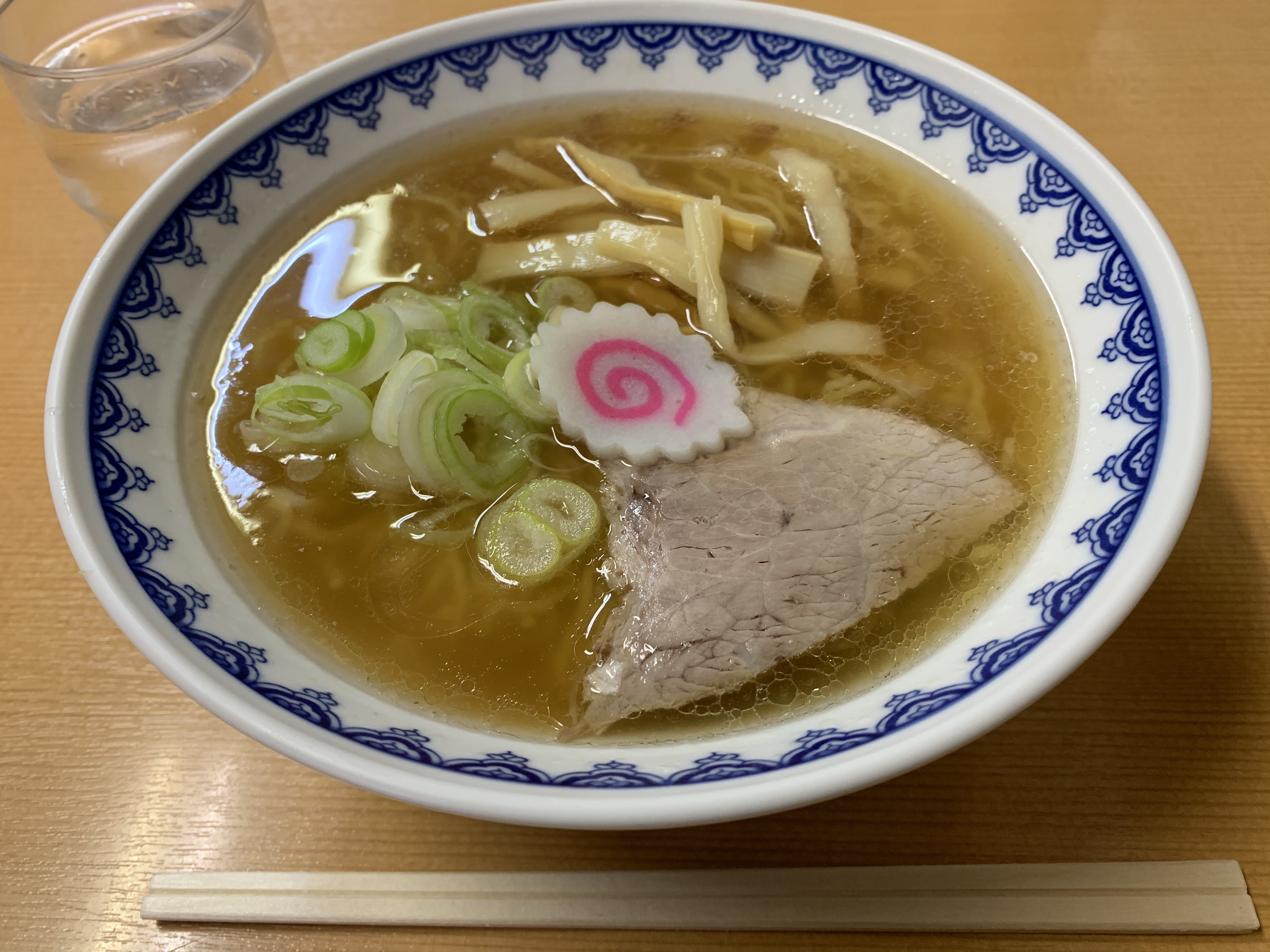
Assari-Shōyu Ramen

=== Sports ===
Club	Sport	League	Venue	Established
Albirex Niigata	Football	J.League	Denka Big Swan Stadium	1955
Niigata Albirex BB	Basketball	B.League	Niigata City Higashi General Sports Center, City Hall Plaza Aore Nagaoka, Toki Messe	2000
Albirex Niigata Ladies	Women's soccer	WE.League	Niigata Athletic Stadium	2002
Niigata Albirex Baseball Club	Baseball	BC.League	Niigata Prefectural Baseball Stadium	2005

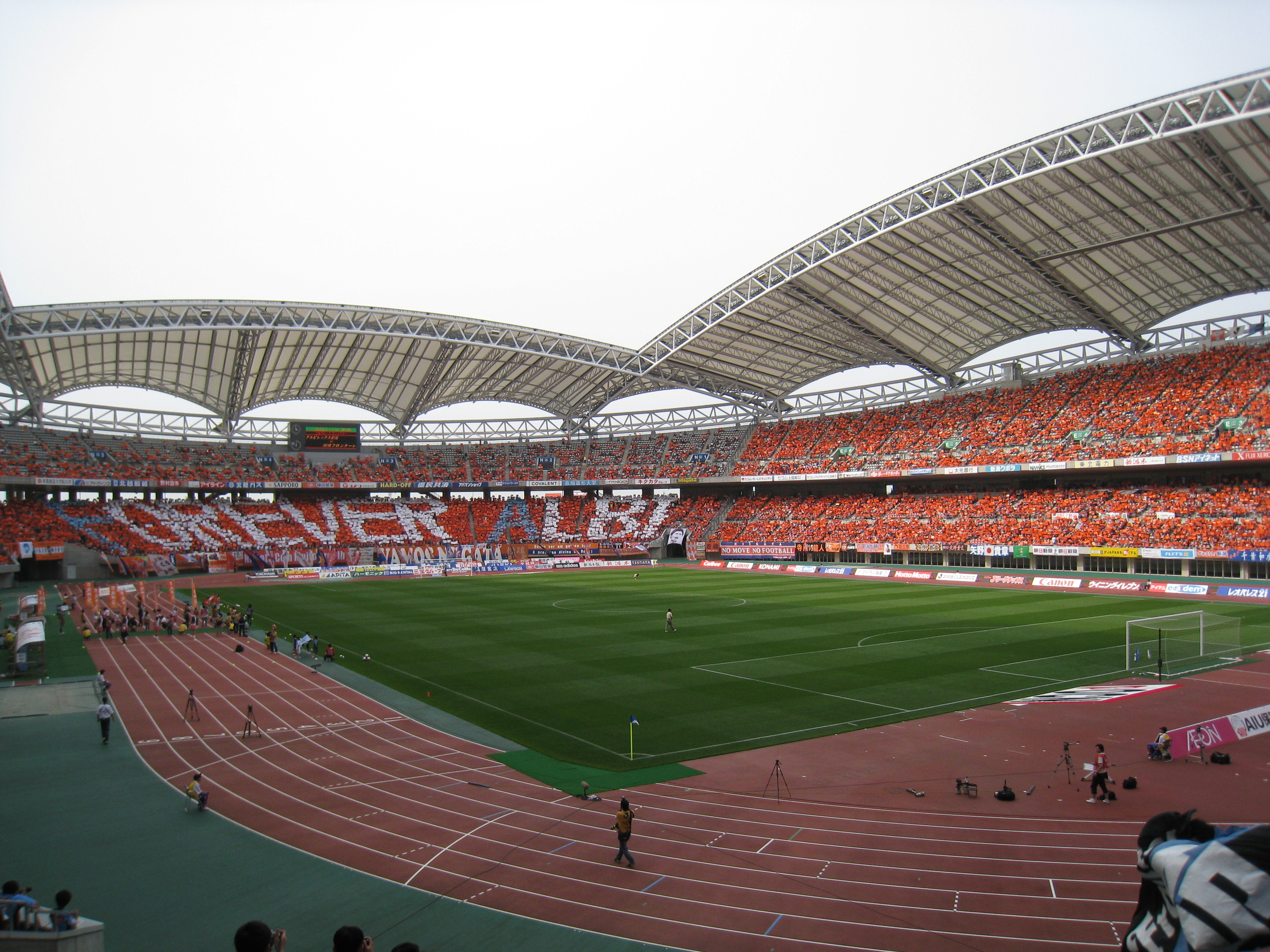
Denka Big Swan Stadium

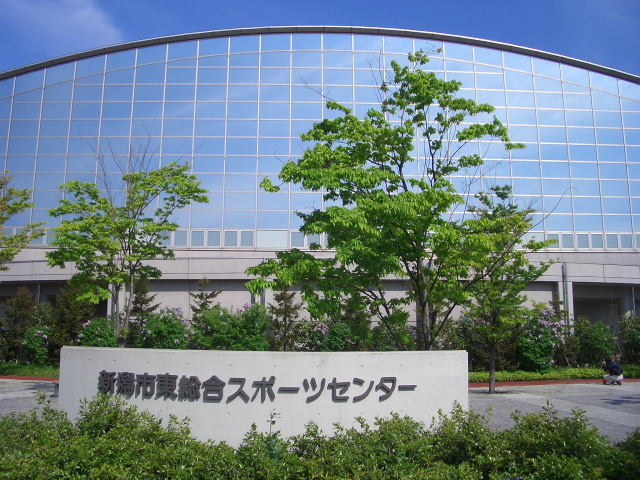
Niigata City Higashi General Sports Center

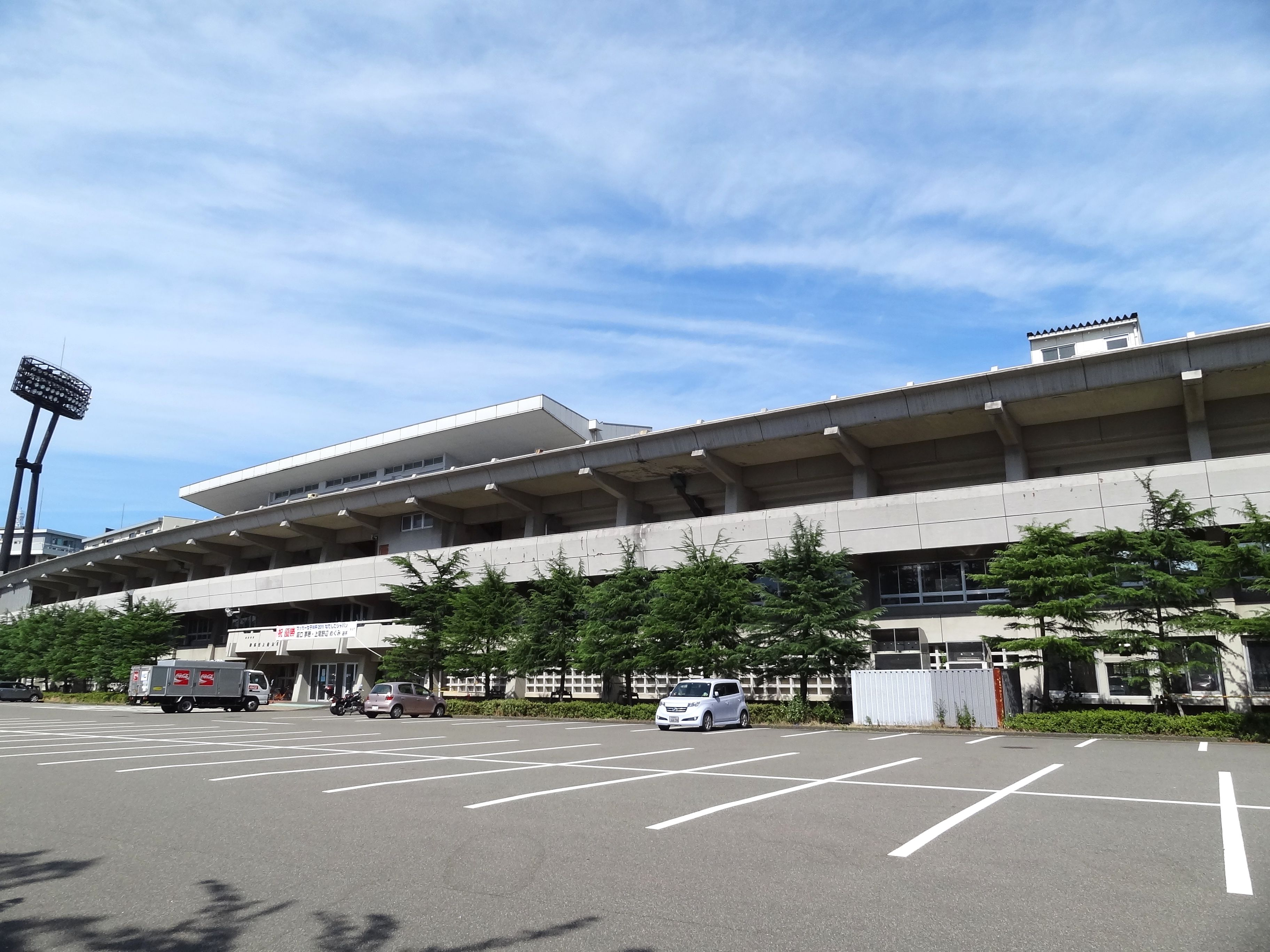
Niigata Athletic Stadium

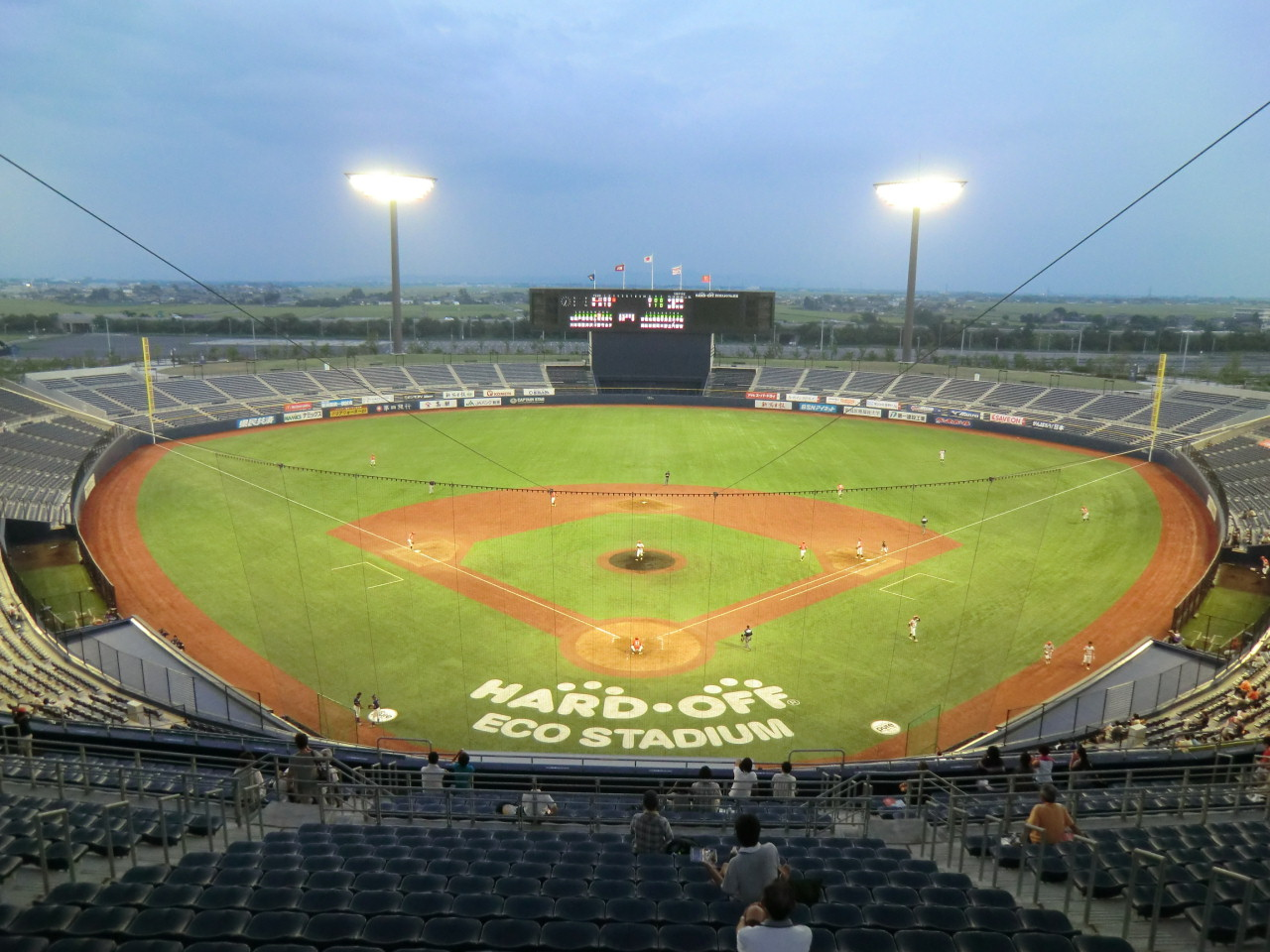
Niigata Prefectural Baseball Stadium

== Notable people from Niigata ==
=== Artists and writers ===
- Yaichi Aizu, poet, calligrapher, and historian
- Shu Fujisawa, writer
- Makoto Kobayashi, manga artist
- Mineo Maya, manga artist
- Shinji Mizushima, manga artist
- Tadashi Nakayama, contemporary woodblock artist
- Takeshi Obata, manga artist
- One, manga artist
- Ango Sakaguchi, author
- Rumiko Takahashi, manga artist

=== Actors and voice actors ===
- Fumika Baba, actress
- Mina Fujii, actress
- Toshihito Ito, actor
- Masashi Mikami, actor
- Bin Shimada, voice actor
- Keiko Yokozawa, voice actor

=== Musicians ===
- coba, accordionist and composer
- Double, singer
- Yoko Ishida, singer
- Katsutaro Kouta, singer
- Közi, guitarist (Malice Mizer and Eve of Destiny)
- NGT48, idol group
- samfree, musical composer and arranger
- Rina Sawayama, singer-songwriter and model
- Akira Yamaoka, composer

=== Others ===
- Takashi Amano, professional aquarist and track cyclist
- Kazuya Kato, mathematician
- Kunio Maekawa, architect
- Ami Nakai, Figure Skater
- Shoko Nakajima, professional wrestler
- Yutakayama Ryota, sumo wrestler
- SANADA (Seiya Sanada), professional wrestler
- Tadao Sato, film critic and film theorist
- Megumi Sato, high jumper
- Meiko Satomura, professional wrestler
- Yujiro Takahashi, professional wrestler
- Megumi Yokota, abduction victim
- Tsubasa Kondo, racing driver
