= Nishikan-ku =

Ward of Niigata City in Chūbu, Japan

Nishikan 西蒲区
- Ward
- Nishikan Ward
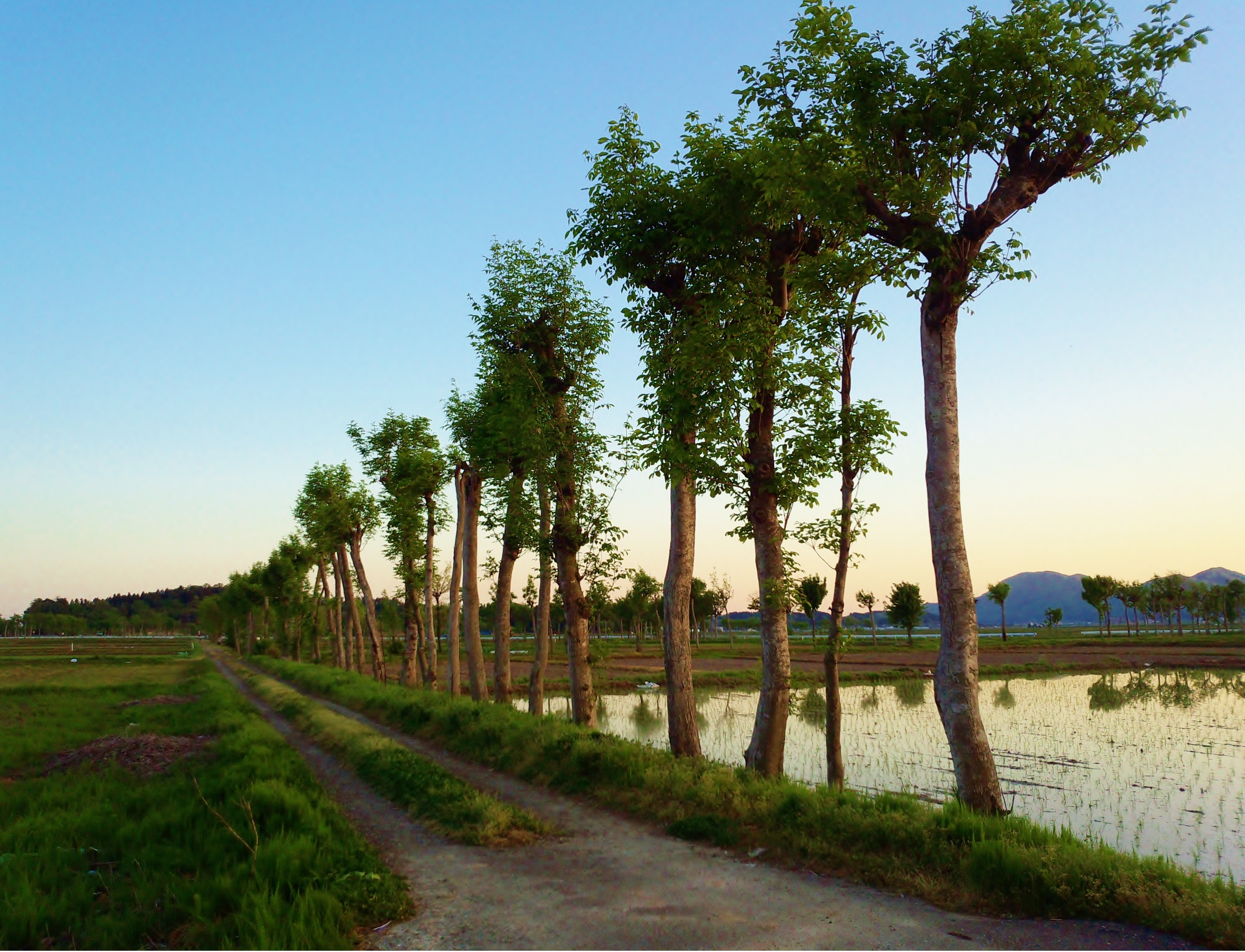
- Haza Tree in Nishikan-ku

- Location of Nishikan-ku in Niigata City

- Coordinates: 37°45′37.8″N 138°53′21.6″E
- Country: Japan
- Region: Kōshin'etsu, Hokuriku (Chūbu)
- Prefecture: Niigata
- City: Niigata

Area
  - Total: 176.55 km^{2} (68.17 sq mi)

Population (September 1, 2016)
  - Total: 55,963
  - Density: 316.98/km^{2} (820.98/sq mi)
- Time zone: UTC+9 (Japan Standard Time)
- Address: 2690-1 Maki-kō, Nishikan-ku, Niigata-shi, Niigata 953-8666
- Phone number: 0256-73-1000
- Climate: Cfa
- Website: Official website

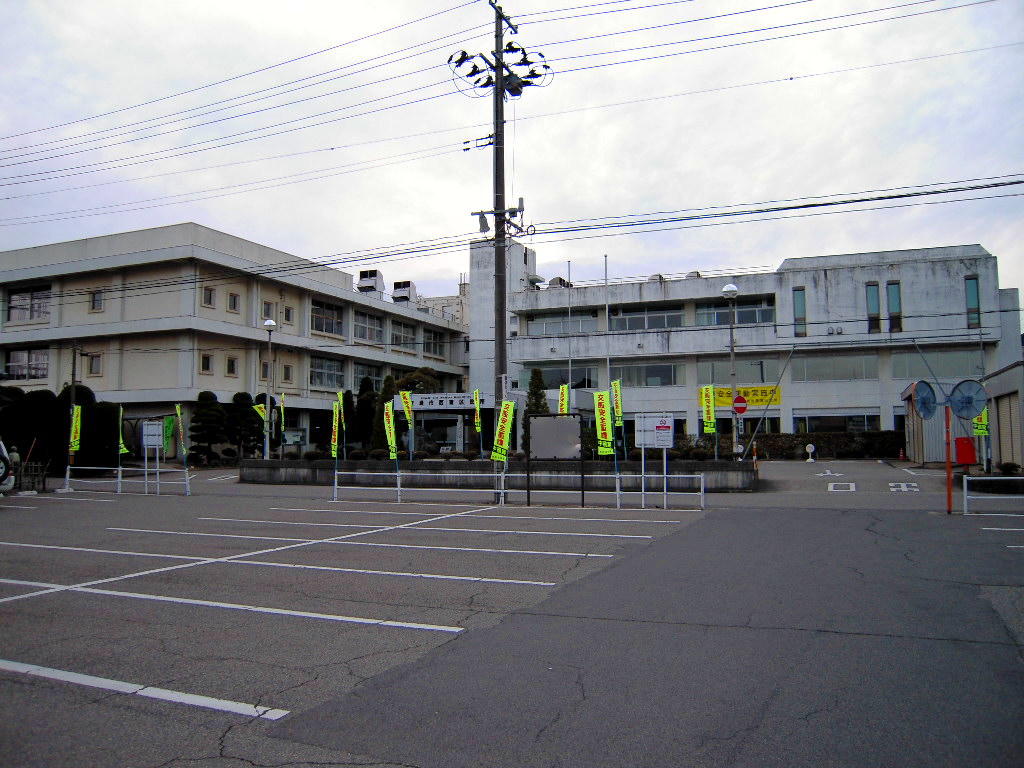
Nishikan Ward Office

Nishikan-ku (西蒲区, Nishikan-ku) is one of the eight wards of Niigata City, Niigata Prefecture, in the Hokuriku region of Japan. As of 1 June 2016, the ward had an estimated population of 55,963 in 20,369 households and a population density of 320 persons per km². The total area of the ward was 176.55 square kilometres (68.17 sq mi).

== Geography ==
Nishikan-ku is located in southwestern Niigata City, bordered by the Sea of Japan to the west. Mount Yahiko is on the border of Nishikan-ku with the neighbouring city of Nagaoka.

=== Surrounding municipalities ===
- Niigata Prefecture
  - Minami-ku, Niigata
  - Nagaoka
  - Nishi-ku, Niigata
  - Tsubame
  - Yahiko

=== Climate ===
Climate data for Nishikan-ku (Note: location in former Maki town) (1991−2020 normals, extremes 1978−present)
Month	Jan	Feb	Mar	Apr	May	Jun	Jul	Aug	Sep	Oct	Nov	Dec	Year
Record high °C (°F)	14.8 (58.6)	21.6 (70.9)	23.2 (73.8)	29.2 (84.6)	32.2 (90.0)	33.2 (91.8)	36.9 (98.4)	38.9 (102.0)	38.6 (101.5)	32.4 (90.3)	24.8 (76.6)	18.9 (66.0)	38.9 (102.0)
Mean daily maximum °C (°F)	5.2 (41.4)	5.9 (42.6)	9.9 (49.8)	16.0 (60.8)	21.4 (70.5)	24.8 (76.6)	28.3 (82.9)	30.2 (86.4)	26.4 (79.5)	20.4 (68.7)	14.2 (57.6)	8.2 (46.8)	17.6 (63.6)
Daily mean °C (°F)	2.1 (35.8)	2.2 (36.0)	5.3 (41.5)	10.7 (51.3)	16.4 (61.5)	20.4 (68.7)	24.3 (75.7)	25.6 (78.1)	21.6 (70.9)	15.6 (60.1)	9.7 (49.5)	4.6 (40.3)	13.2 (55.8)
Mean daily minimum °C (°F)	−0.7 (30.7)	−1.1 (30.0)	1.0 (33.8)	5.6 (42.1)	12.1 (53.8)	16.8 (62.2)	21.0 (69.8)	21.9 (71.4)	17.7 (63.9)	11.2 (52.2)	5.6 (42.1)	1.4 (34.5)	9.4 (48.9)
Record low °C (°F)	−13.1 (8.4)	−12.0 (10.4)	−7.5 (18.5)	−3.2 (26.2)	4.0 (39.2)	8.8 (47.8)	13.4 (56.1)	12.7 (54.9)	7.1 (44.8)	1.8 (35.2)	−5.4 (22.3)	−12.2 (10.0)	−13.1 (8.4)
Average precipitation mm (inches)	165.2 (6.50)	99.8 (3.93)	99.9 (3.93)	90.9 (3.58)	85.2 (3.35)	117.0 (4.61)	213.3 (8.40)	154.2 (6.07)	130.4 (5.13)	136.1 (5.36)	190.2 (7.49)	222.8 (8.77)	1,704.1 (67.09)
Average precipitation days (≥ 1.0 mm)	20.1	16.2	15.9	11.8	10.3	9.9	12.5	10.1	11.7	13.6	17.5	20.6	170.2
Mean monthly sunshine hours	47.9	71.2	129.9	171.5	195.0	174.9	157.8	182.4	139.1	126.0	85.4	49.6	1,530.7
Source: Japan Meteorological Agency

== History ==
The area of present-day Nishikan-ku was part of ancient Echigo Province. The town of Sone and the village of Iwamuro were established on April 1, 1889 within Nakakanbara District, Niigata with the establishment of the municipalities system. The town of Maki was created on April 10, 1891 by the merger of 14 hamlets, and expanded on January 1, 1955 by annexing five neighbouring villages. The town of Nishikawa was founded on January 1, 1955 by the merger of Sone with the village of Masugata. The city of Niigata annexed the towns of Maki and Masugata and the villages of Iwamuro, Katahigashi and Nakanokuchi on March 21, 2005. Niigata became a government-designated city on April 1, 2007 and was divided into wards, with the new Nishikan Ward consisting of these areas.

== Education ==
Nishikan-ku has 13 public elementary schools and six public middle schools operated by the Niigata city government. The ward has three public high schools operated by the Niigata Prefectural Board of Education. The prefecture also operates two special education schools.

== Transportation ==
=== Railway ===
JR East - Echigo Line

- Echigo-Sone - Maki - Iwamuro

=== Highways ===
- Hokuriku Expressway
- National Route 116
- National Route 402 (Seaside Line)
- National Route 460

== Local attractions ==
- Iwamuro Onsen (hot spring) Resort
- Taho Onsen (hot spring)
- Mount Kakuda
- Uwasekigata Lagoon Park
- Maze Sea Circuit
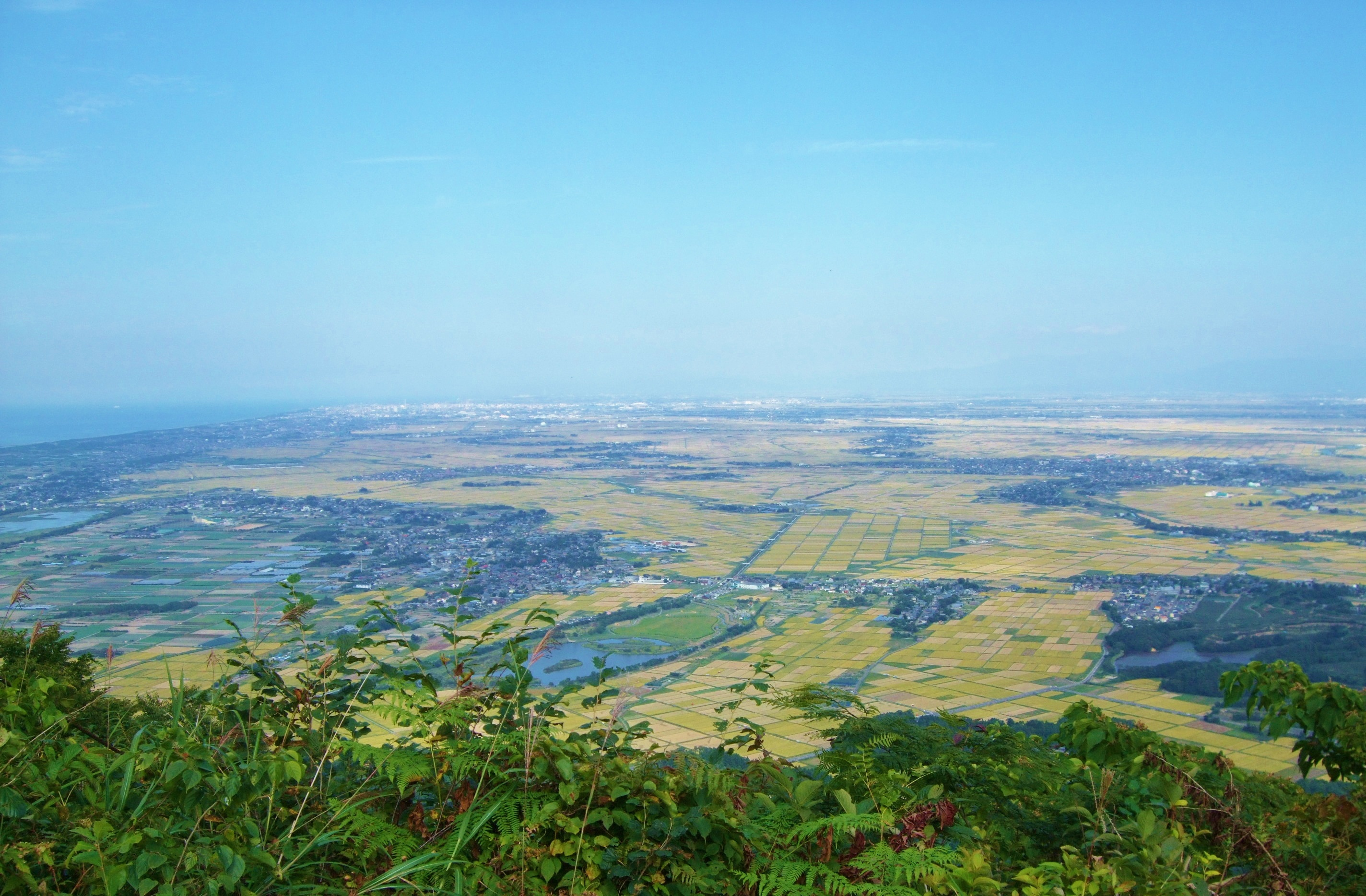
View from Mount Kakuda (center: Uwasekigata Lagoon Park)

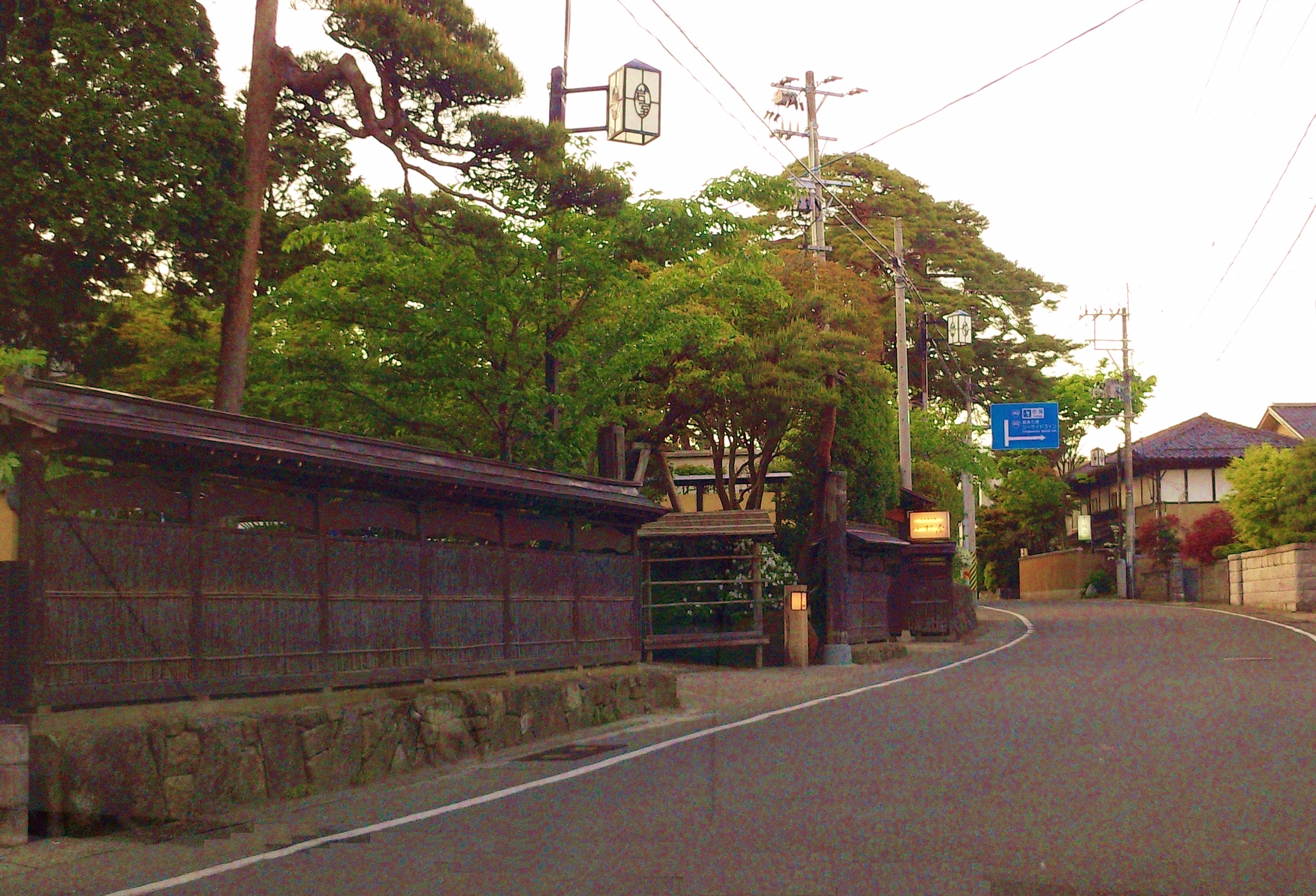
Iwamuro Onsen

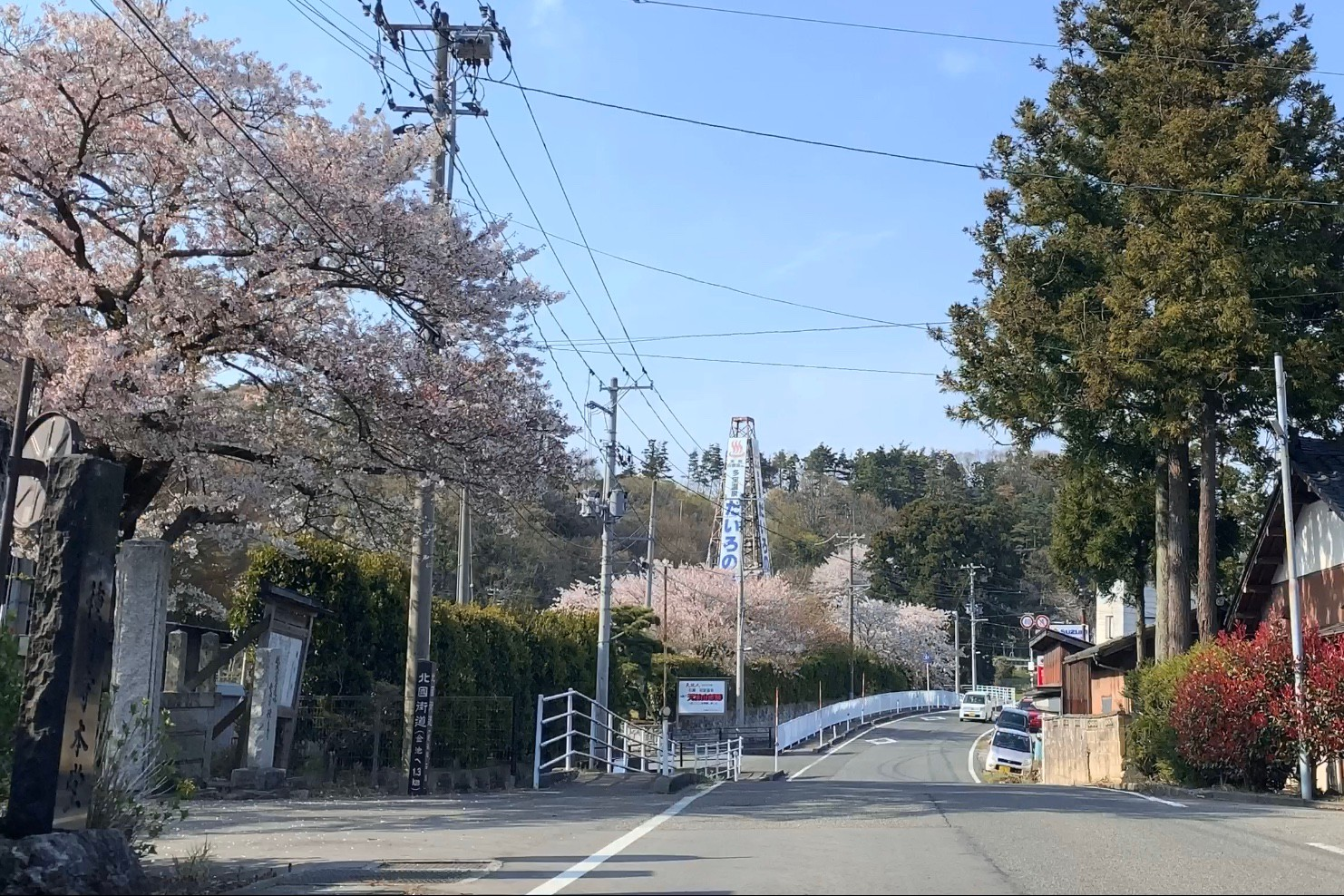
Hokkoku Kaidō and Taho Onsen

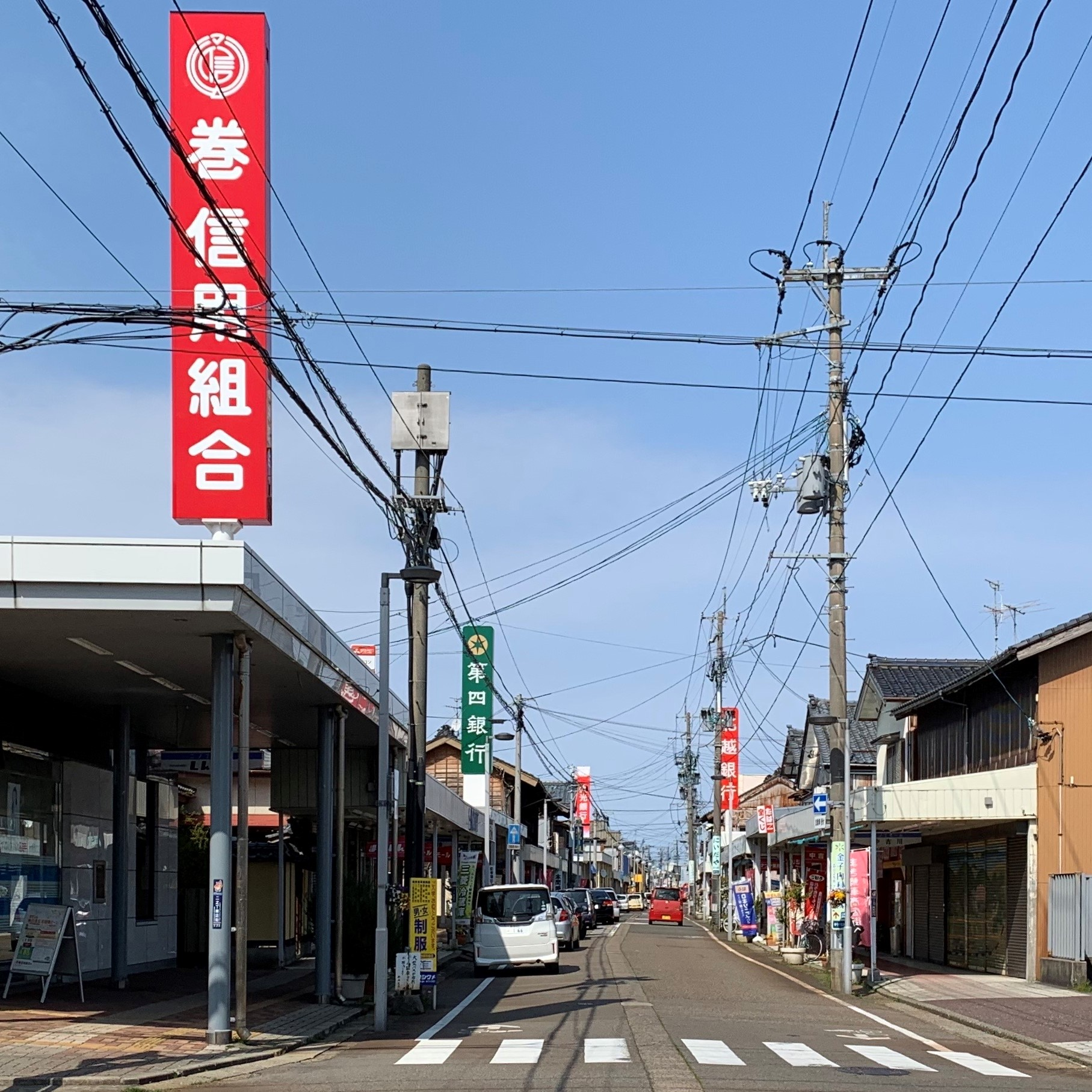
Maki shopping street
