= Minami-ku, Niigata =

Ward of Niigata City in Chūbu, Japan

Minami-ku 南区
- Ward
- Minami Ward
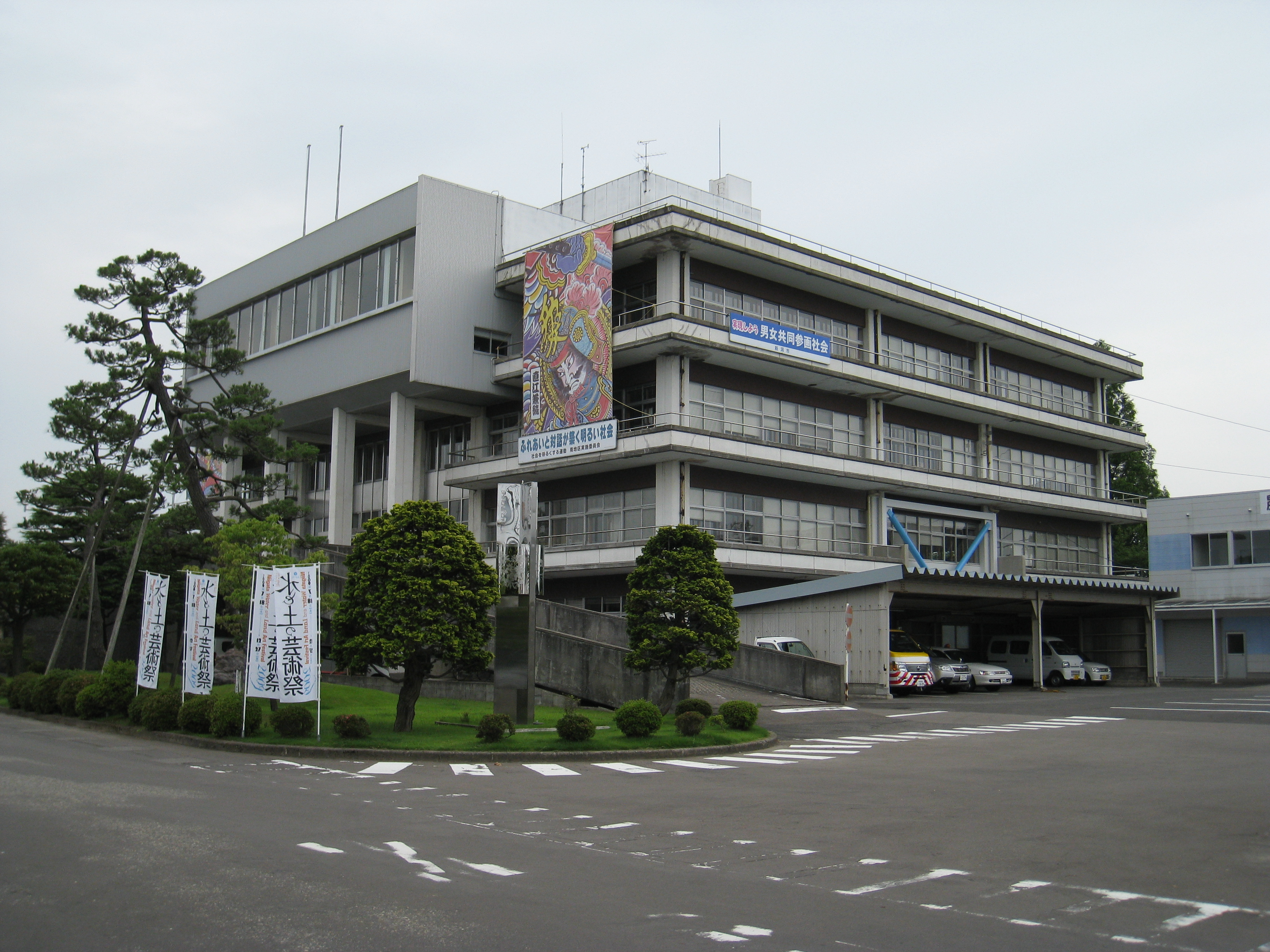
- Minami-ku Ward Office

- Location of Minami-ku in Niigata City

- Coordinates: 37°45′56.9″N 139°1′9″E
- Country: Japan
- Region: Kōshin'etsu, Hokuriku (Chūbu)
- Prefecture: Niigata
- City: Niigata

Area
  - Total: 100.91 km^{2} (38.96 sq mi)

Population (September 1, 2018)
  - Total: 44,522
  - Density: 441.21/km^{2} (1,142.7/sq mi)
- Time zone: UTC+9 (Japan Standard Time)
- Address: 1235 Shirone, Minami-ku, Niigata-shi, Niigata-ken 950-1292
- Phone number: 025-373-1000
- Website: Official website

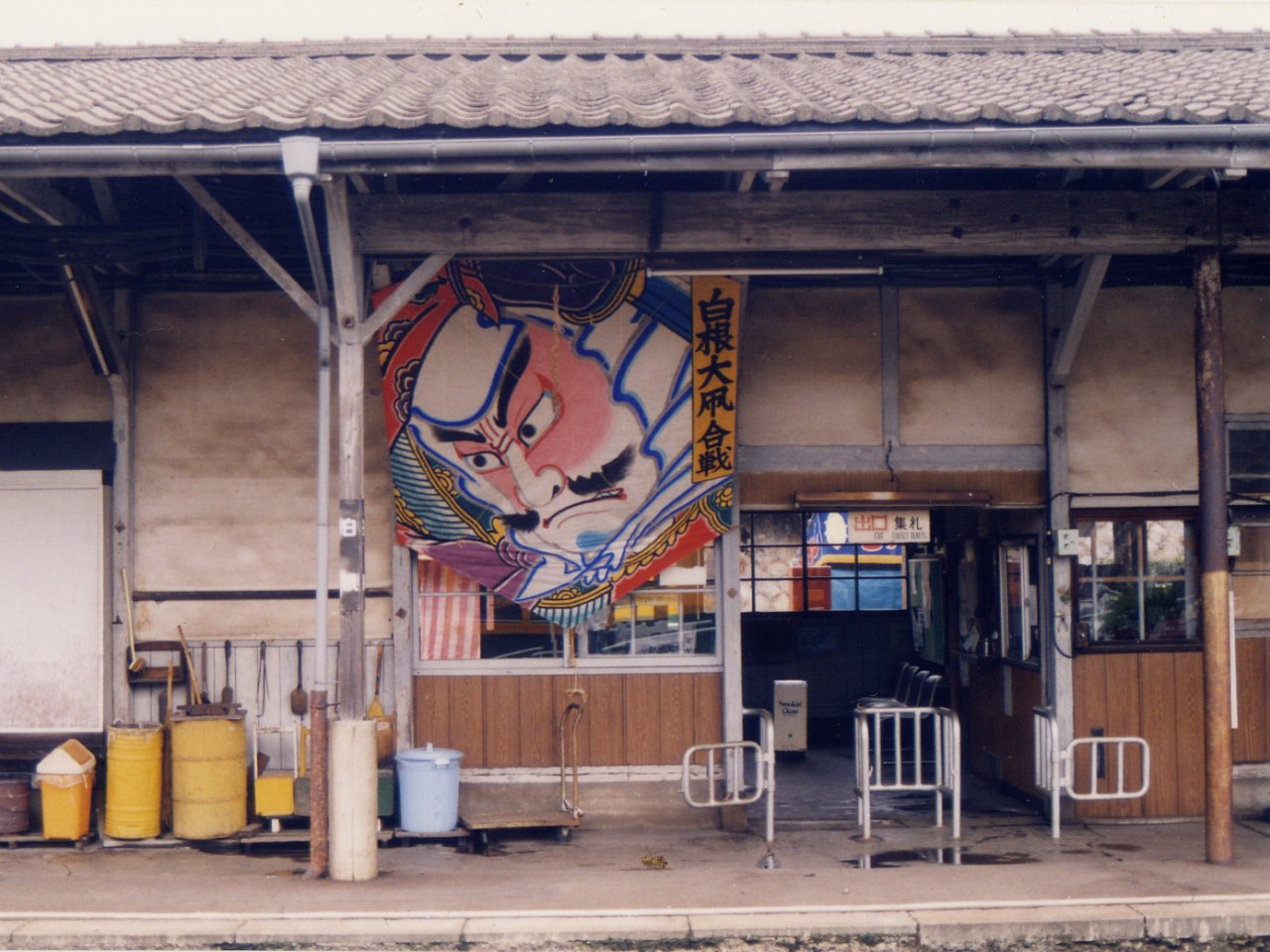
Kite and Old Shirone Station, June 1997

Minami-ku (南区, Minami-ku) is one of the eight wards of Niigata City, Niigata Prefecture, in the Hokuriku region of Japan. As of 1 September 2018, the ward had an estimated population of 44,522 in 15,980 households and a population density of 440 persons per km^{2}. The total area of the ward was 100.91 square kilometres (38.96 sq mi).

== Geography ==
Minami-ku is located in an inland region of north-central Niigata Prefecture. The area is dominated by agriculture, notably rice production and horticulture.

=== Surrounding municipalities ===
- Niigata Prefecture
  - Akiha-ku, Niigata
  - Kamo
  - Kōnan-ku, Niigata
  - Nishi-ku, Niigata
  - Nishikan-ku, Niigata
  - Sanjō
  - Tagami
  - Tsubame

== History ==
The area of present-day Minami-ku was part of ancient Echigo Province. The modern town of Shirone and village of Ajikata were established on April 1, 1889, within Nakakanbara District with the establishment of the municipalities system. The village of Tsukigata was created on April 1, 1906, by the merger of three hamlets. Shirone was elevated to city status on June 1, 1959. The city of Niigata annexed Shirone, Ajikata and Tsukigata on March 21, 2005. Niigata became a government-designated city on April 1, 2007, and was divided into wards, with the new Minami Ward consisting of the former city of Shirone and former villages of Ajikata and Tsukigata.

== Education ==
Minami-ku has 11 public elementary schools and six public middle schools operated by the Niigata city government. There is one public high school operated by the Niigata Prefectural Board of Education.

== Transportation ==
=== Railways ===
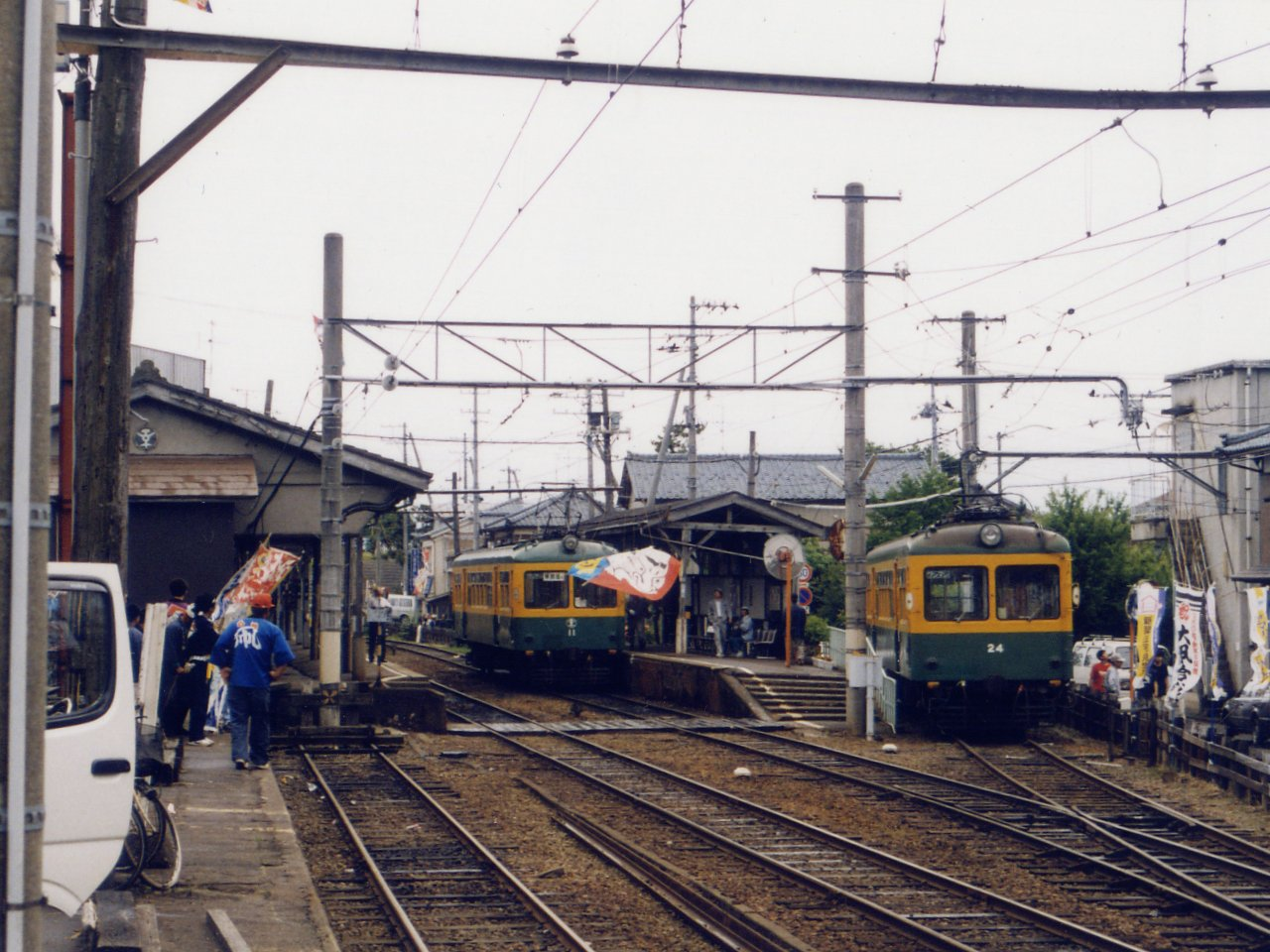
Shirone Station, June 1997

Minami-ku is not served by any passenger rail service. A railway line operated by Niigata Kotsu ceased operations in 1999.

- Higashi-Sekiya—Shirone—Tsukigata: closed in 1999
- Tsukigata—Tsubame: closed in 1993

=== Transit bus ===
- Transit bus operated by Niigata Kotsu
  - W7 / W8

=== Highways ===
- National Route 8
- National Route 460

== Local attractions ==
=== Places ===
- Niigata Agriculture Park

=== Event ===
- Shirone Giant Kite Battle
