= Niitsu, Niigata =

Niitsu 新津市
- Former municipality
- Flag Seal

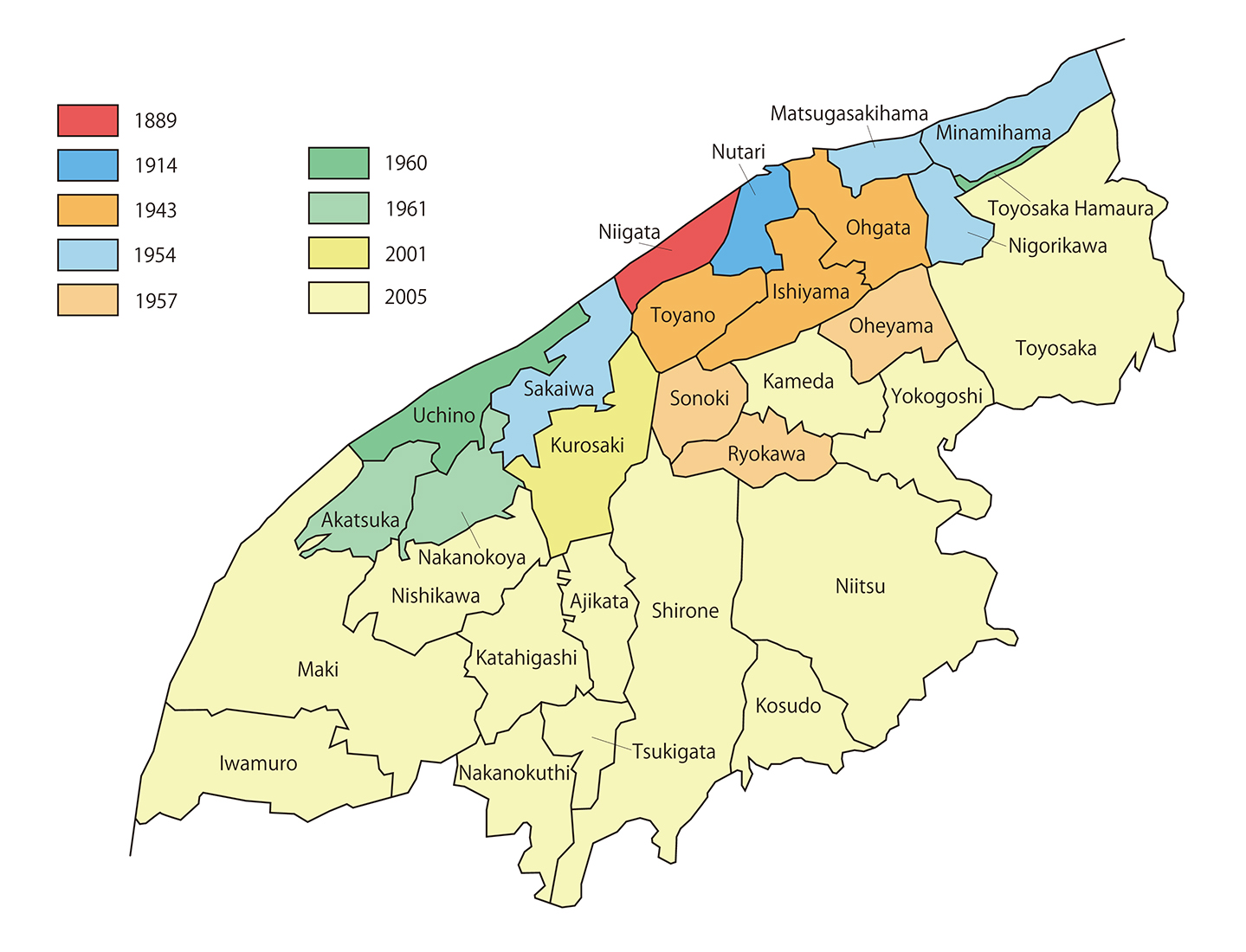
- Location of Niitsu in Niigata Prefecture
- Country: Japan
- Region: Hokuriku
- Prefecture: Niigata Prefecture
- Merged: March 21, 2005 (now part of Niigata)

Area
  - Total: 78.28 km^{2} (30.22 sq mi)

Population (2005)
  - Total: 66,446
- Time zone: UTC+09:00 (JST)
- Symbols
- Tree: Pine

Niitsu (新津市, Niitsu-shi) was a city located in Niigata Prefecture, Japan. The city itself was founded on January 1, 1951, but the area had already been opened to railway traffic as early as November 20, 1897. As of 2003, the city had an estimated population of 66,058 and the density of 843.87 persons per km^{2}. The total area was 78.28 km^{2}. The city is notable for its Peace Pagoda, built by Nipponzan Myohoji in 1967.

On March 21, 2005, Niitsu was merged into the expanded city of Niigata. Other cities merged into Niigata at this time include the cities of Shirone and Toyosaka, the towns of Kameda, Kosudo and Yokogoshi (all from Nakakanbara District), the town of Nishikawa, and the villages of Ajikata, Iwamuro, Katahigashi, Nakanokuchi and Tsukigata (all from Nishikanbara District).

As of April 1, 2007, the area was part of Akiha-ku ward of Niigata City.

== Geography ==
The Akiha hill extends to the south of the city, surrounded by plains. The city is located between the Shinano River on the east side, and the Agano River on the west side. The Niitsu River (Noudai River) flows between these rivers through the middle of the city, until it reaches the Koagano River, a small body of water that connects the Shinano and the Agano rivers. The Small Agano River flows outward from the mouth of the Niitsu, emptying into both the Shinano and Agano Rivers.

=== Mayors ===
1. Konoshichi Fuzawa (1951-1953)
2. Shigeo Kubota (1953-1961)
3. Yuda Katsura (1961-1970)
4. Tamotsu Shida (1970-1980)
5. Tomio Saito (1981-1991)
6. Kazumi Kobayashi (1991-2000)
7. Koei Yuda (2000-2005)

== See also ==
- Akiha-ku, Niigata
- Niigata, Niigata
- Niitsu Station
