= Yoshida, Niigata =

Yoshida 吉田町
- Former municipality
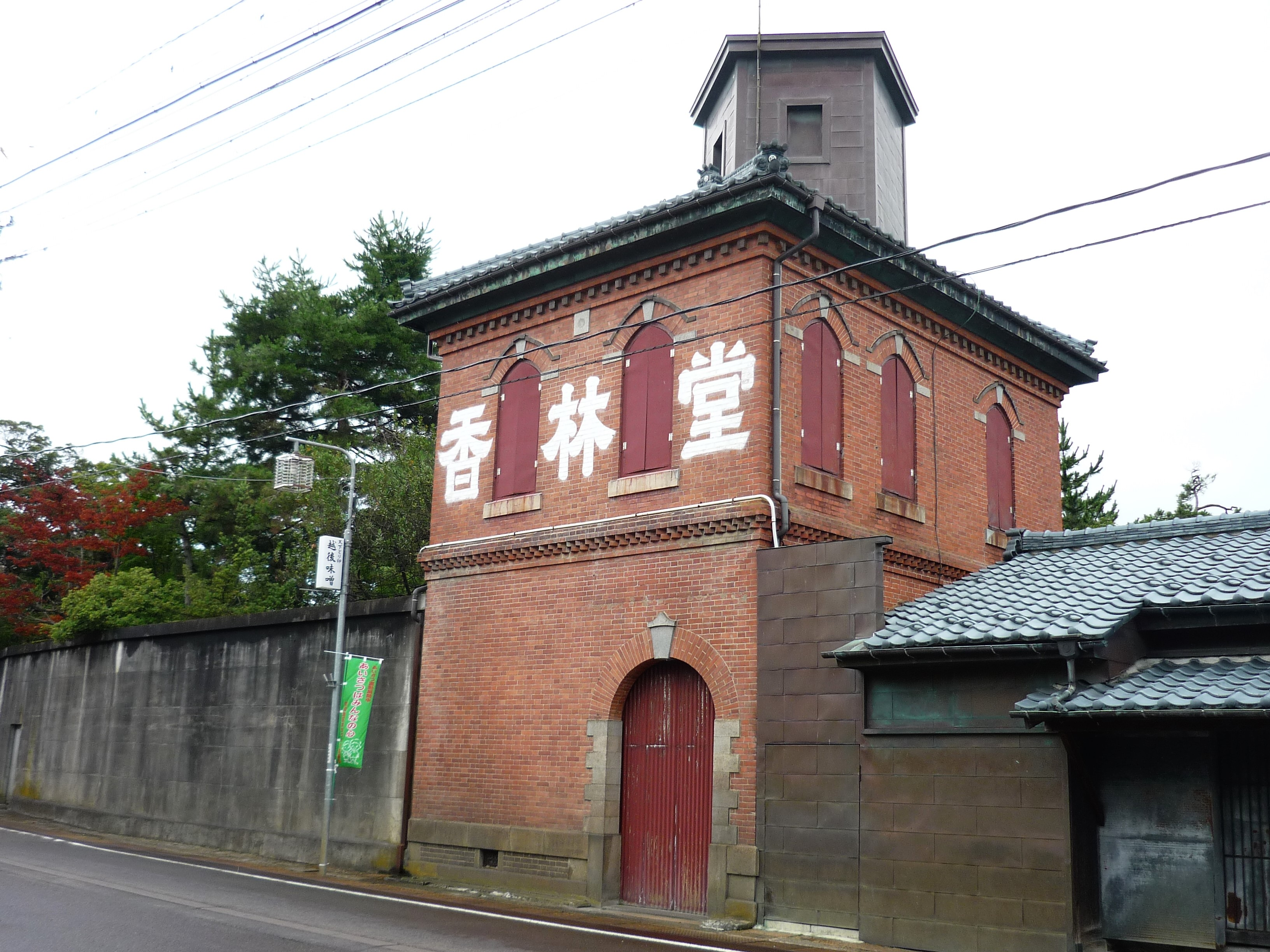
- Imai Residence

- Flag Seal
- Interactive map of Yoshida
- Country: Japan
- Region: Hokuriku
- Prefecture: Niigata Prefecture
- District: Nishikanbara District
- Merged: March 20, 2006 (now part of Tsubame)

Area
  - Total: 32.00 km^{2} (12.36 sq mi)

Population (2005)
  - Total: 24,937
- Time zone: UTC+09:00 (JST)
- Symbols
- Tree: Viburnum odoratissimum

3 former municipalities merged to create the new Tsubame City (blue area)

Yoshida (吉田町, Yoshida-machi) was a town located in Nishikanbara District, Niigata Prefecture, Japan. Yoshida is now a part of the expanded city of Tsubame.

As of April 1, 2005, the town had an estimated population of 24,937. The total area was 32.00 km^{2}.

On March 20, 2006, Yoshida, along with the town of Bunsui (also from Nishikanbara District), was merged into the expanded city of Tsubame.

== Transportation ==
=== Railway ===
- JR East - Echigo Line
  - Aōzu - Minami-Yoshida - Yoshida - Kita-Yoshida
- JR East - Yahiko Line
  - Yoshida

=== Highway ===
- National Route 116
- National Route 289
