= Iwamuro Station =

Railway station in Niigata, Japan

Iwamuro Station 岩室駅
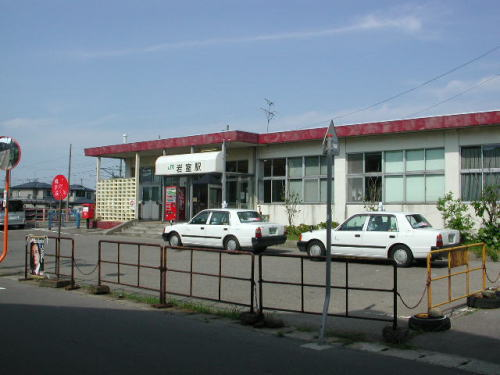
- Iwamuro Station in July 2004

General information
- Location: 1-14-1 Wanō, Nishikan-ku, Niigata-shi, Niigata-ken 953-0125; Japan
- Coordinates: 37°43′16.73″N 138°52′47.74″E
- Operator: JR East
- Line: ■ Echigo Line
- Distance: 53.8 km from Kashiwazaki
- Platforms: 1 side platform
- Tracks: 1

Other information
- Status: Staffed
- Website: Official website

History
- Opened: 25 August 1912
- Former names: Wanō (until 1965)

Passengers
- FY2010: 545 daily

Services
| Preceding station | JR East | Following station |
|---|---|---|
| Kita-Yoshida towards Kashiwazaki | Echigo Line | Maki towards Niigata |
Location
- Location within JR Echigo Line Location within Niigata city Location within Niigata Prefecture Location within Japan

Iwamuro Station (岩室駅, Iwamuro-eki) is a railway station located in the Iwamuro neighbourhood of Nishikan-ku, Niigata, Japan. It is operated by JR East.

== Lines ==
Iwamuro Station is served by the Echigo Line, and is 53.8 kilometers from the starting point of the line at Kashiwazaki Station.

== Layout ==
The station consists of one ground-level side platform serving a single bi-directional track. The station building has a waiting hall and toilets. Outside there are taxis and regular bus services.

The station is unattended. Suica farecard can be used at this station.

== History ==
When the station opened on 25 August 1912 on the Hakusan Echigo Railway it was originally called Wanō Station (和納駅). It had a staffed station office, four platforms, sidings and freight yards. On 1 October 1927, the Echigo line was nationalised. The station was renamed Iwamuro on December 25, 1965. On January 1, 1973 all freight handling ceased at the station. The sidings and two side platforms were closed and eventually removed. On 1 April 1987 the station was transferred to JR East Japan Railways when the Japanese rail network was privatized. Beginning on 21 January 2006, passengers were able to use Suica cards at the station. On 31 March 2007, after 95 years, the staffed station office was closed. Tickets are now purchased from an automated vending machine.

== Surrounding area ==
- National Route 116
- Wanō Elementary School
- Wanō Post Office

== See also ==
- List of railway stations in Japan
