= Kameda, Niigata =

Coordinates: 37°52′4″N 139°5′39″E

Kameda 亀田町
- Former municipality
- Flag Emblem

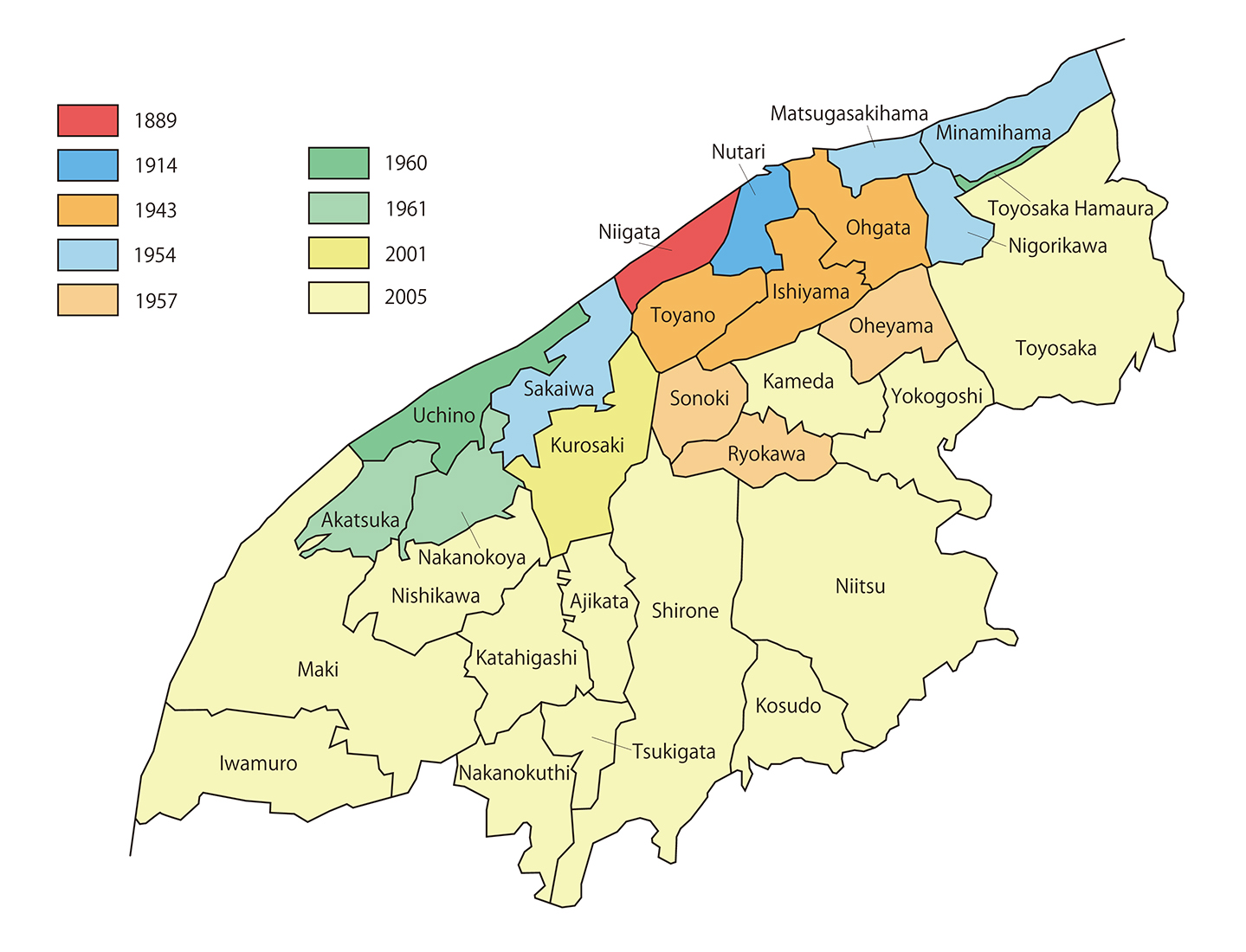
- Location of Kameda in Niigata Prefecture
- Country: Japan
- Region: Hokuriku
- Prefecture: Niigata Prefecture
- District: Nakakanbara District
- Merged: March 21, 2005 (now part of Niigata)

Area
  - Total: 16.82 km^{2} (6.49 sq mi)

Population (2005)
  - Total: 32,382
- Time zone: UTC+09:00 (JST)
- Symbols
- Flower: Rhododendron indicum
- Tree: Pine

Kameda (亀田町, Kameda-machi) was a town located in Nakakanbara District, Niigata Prefecture, Japan.

As of 2003, the town had an estimated population of 32,386 and a density of 1,925.45 persons per km^{2}. The total area was 16.82 km^{2}.

On March 21, 2005, Kameda, along with the cities of Niitsu, Shirone and Toyosaka, the towns of Kosudo and Yokogoshi (all from Nakakanbara District), the town of Nishikawa, and the villages of Ajikata, Iwamuro, Katahigashi, Nakanokuchi and Tsukigata (all from Nishikanbara District), was merged into the expanded city of Niigata. As of April 1, 2007, the area is part of the Kōnan-ku ward.

== See also ==
- Kōnan-ku, Niigata
- Niigata, Niigata
- Kameda Station
