= Kōnan-ku =

Kōnan-ku may refer to:

- Kōnan-ku, Niigata (江南区)
- Kōnan-ku, Yokohama (港南区)
