= Shirone, Niigata =

Shirone 白根市
- Former municipality
- Flag Seal

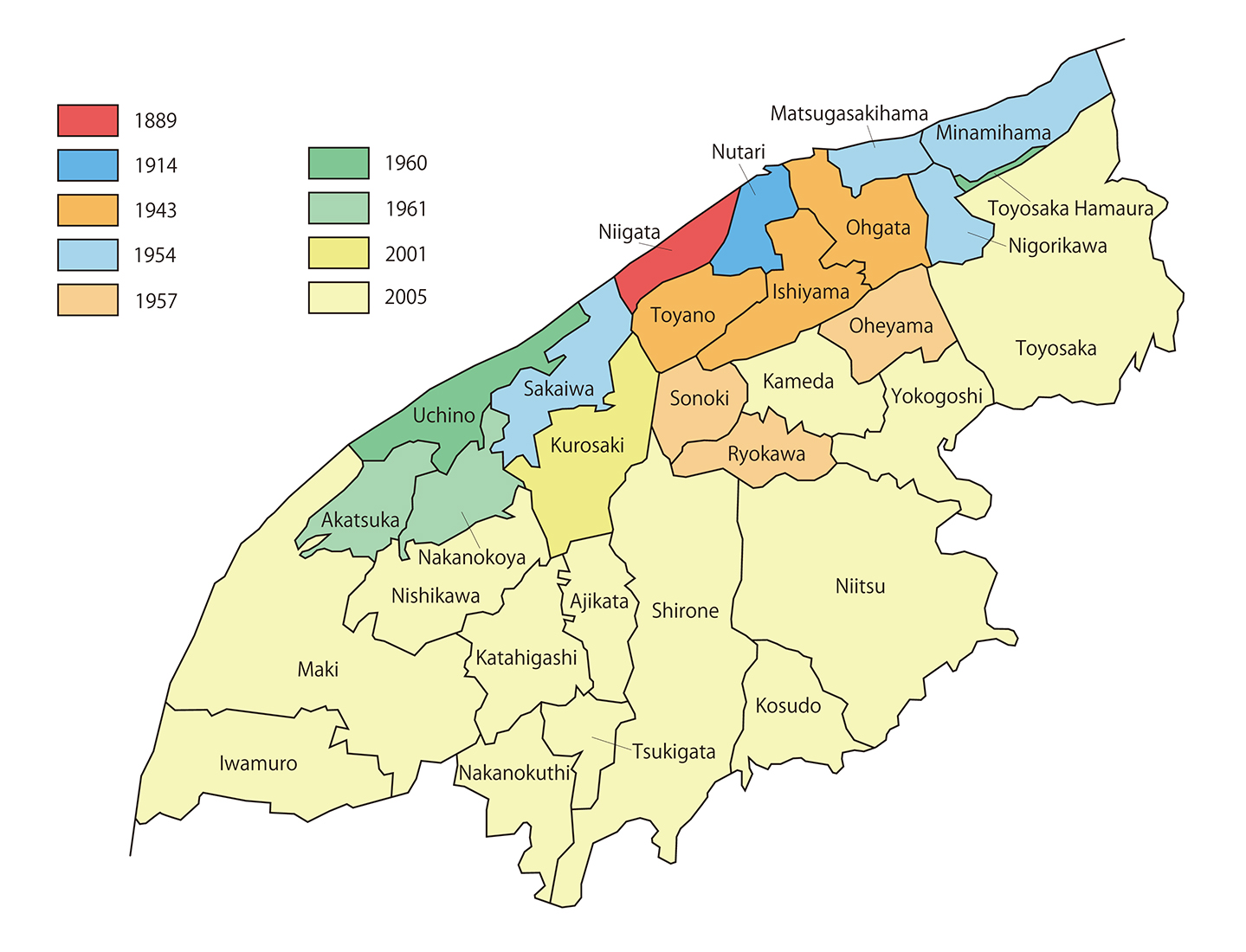
- Location of Shirone in Niigata Prefecture

- Location in Japan
- Coordinates: 37°45′56.9″N 139°1′9″E
- Country: Japan
- Region: Hokuriku
- Prefecture: Niigata Prefecture
- Merged: March 21, 2005 (now part of Niigata)

Area
  - Total: 77.06 km^{2} (29.75 sq mi)

Population (2005)
  - Total: 39,737
- Time zone: UTC+09:00 (JST)
- Symbols
- Flower: Tulip

Shirone (白根市, Shirone-shi) was a city located in Niigata Prefecture, Japan. The city was founded on June 1, 1959.

== Population ==
As of 2003, the city had an estimated population of 39,966 and density of 518.63 inhabitants per square kilometre (1,343.2/sq mi). The total area was 77.06 km^{2} (29.75 sq mi).

== History ==
On March 21, 2005, Shirone, along with the cities of Niitsu and Toyosaka, the towns of Kameda, Kosudo and Yokogoshi (all from Nakakanbara District), the town of Nishikawa, and the villages of Ajikata, Iwamuro, Katahigashi, Nakanokuchi and Tsukigata (all from Nishikanbara District), was merged into the expanded city of Niigata. As of April 1, 2007, the area is now part of Minami-ku ward.

== Festivals ==
=== Kite festival ===
In June every year, Shirone hosts the week-long Giant Kite Festival (takomatsuri). Opposing teams formed by residents battle across the Nakanoguchi River using giants kites.

The kites are hand made and painted by the team members for the duration of the preceding year. Each kite measures about 7 m × 3 m (23.0 ft × 9.8 ft) and typically sports a portrait of a samurai, local figure, or mascot signifying the area or team sponsor. Each team lines their side of the river and runs the kite into flight.

Once airborne, the kites are carried by the wind and the hand-made lines are invariably tangled. This is due to the prevailing wind direction in June and the particular course of the river. The teams then engage in a tug of war until the ropes break—the winning team being the team that pulls over more of the opponent's rope.

== See also ==
- Minami-ku, Niigata
- Niigata, Niigata
