= Yokogoshi, Niigata =

Yokogoshi 横越町
- Former municipality
- Interactive map of Yokogoshi
- Country: Japan
- Region: Hokuriku
- Prefecture: Niigata Prefecture
- District: Nakakanbara District
- Merged: March 21, 2005 (now part of Niigata)

Area
  - Total: 23.62 km^{2} (9.12 sq mi)

Population (2005)
  - Total: 11,543
- Time zone: UTC+09:00 (JST)
- Symbols
- Flower: Tulip

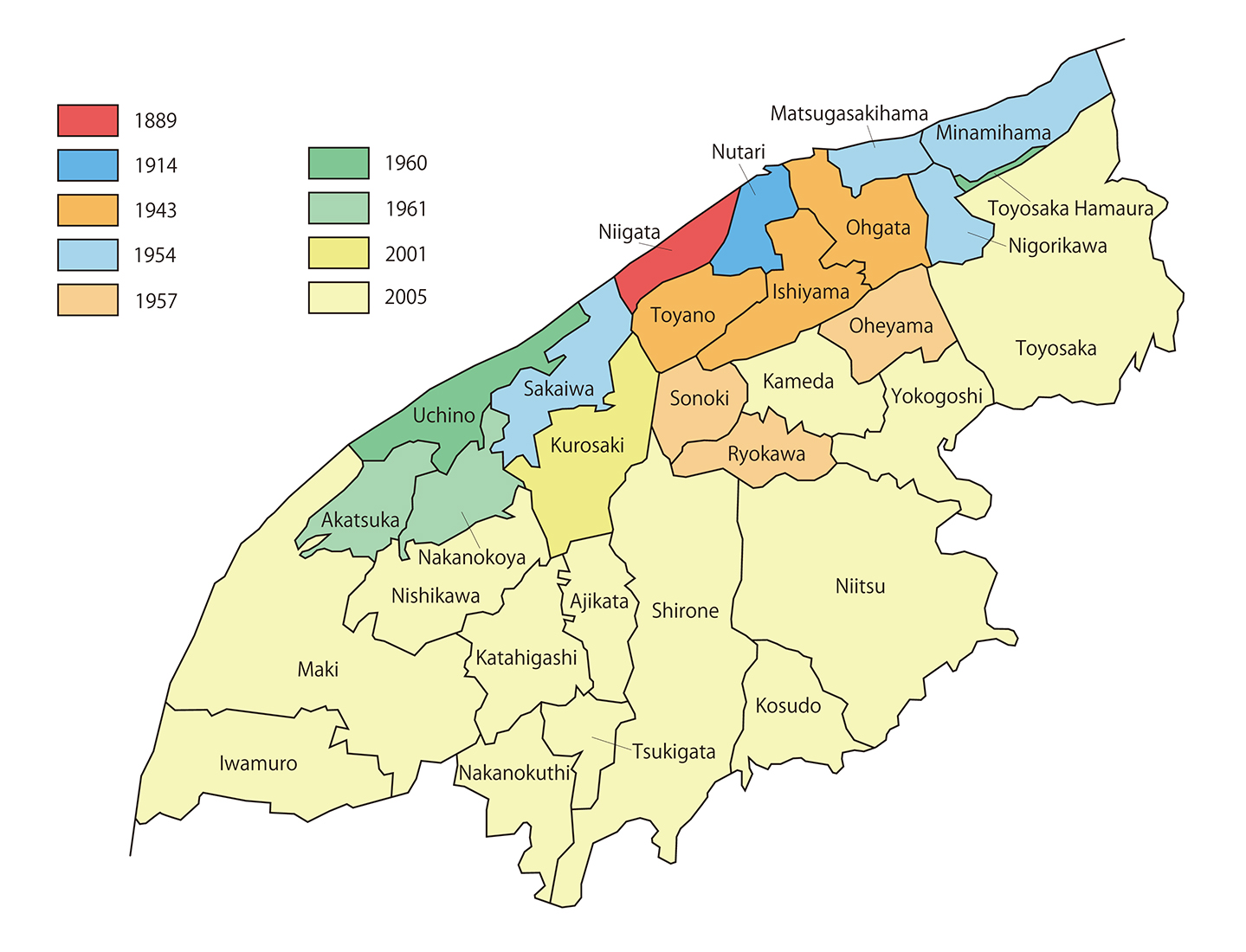
Mergers of Niigata

Yokogoshi (横越町, Yokogoshi-machi) was a town located in Nakakanbara District, Niigata Prefecture, Japan.

As of 2003, the town had an estimated population of 11,339 and a density of 480.06 inhabitants per km^{2}. The total area was 23.62 km^{2}.

On March 21, 2005, Yoskogoshi, along with the cities of Niitsu, Shirone and Toyosaka, the towns of Kameda and Kosudo (all from Nakakanbara District), the town of Nishikawa, and the villages of Ajikata, Iwamuro, Katahigashi, Nakanokuchi and Tsukigata (all from Nishikanbara District), was merged into the expanded city of Niigata. Since April 1, 2007, the area has been part of the Kōnan-ku ward.

== See also ==
- Kōnan-ku, Niigata
- Niigata, Niigata
