= Bunsui, Niigata =

Bunsui 分水町
- Former municipality
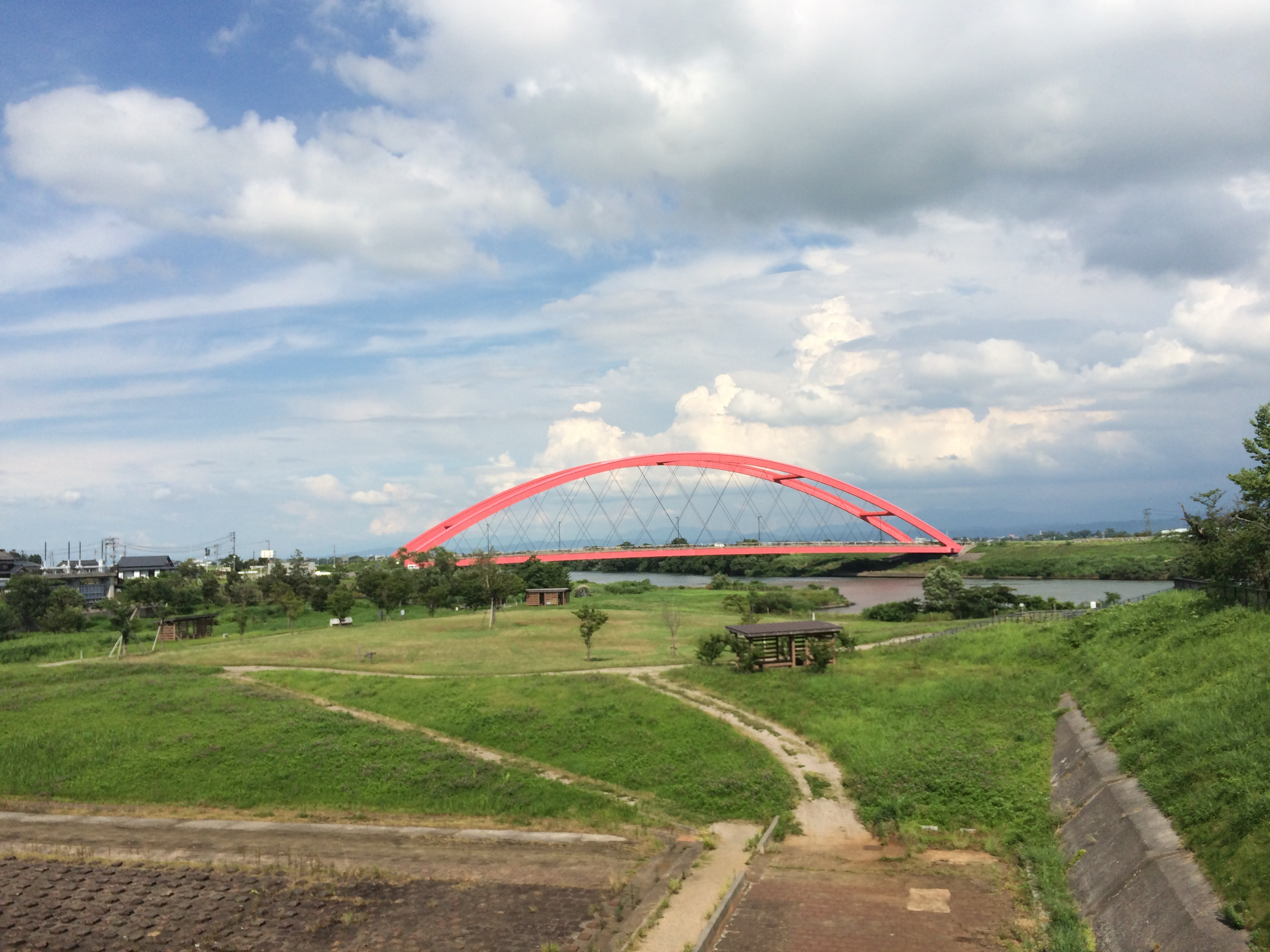
- Honsen Bridge

- Flag Emblem
- Interactive map of Bunsui
- Country: Japan
- Region: Hokuriku
- Prefecture: Niigata Prefecture
- District: Nishikanbara District
- Merged: March 20, 2006 (now part of Tsubame)

Area
  - Total: 39.61 km^{2} (15.29 sq mi)

Population (2005)
  - Total: 15,130
- Time zone: UTC+09:00 (JST)
- Symbols
- Tree: Cherry blossom

3 former municipalities merged to create the new Tsubame City (blue area)

Bunsui (分水町, Bunsui-machi) was a town located in Nishikanbara District, Niigata Prefecture, Japan. Bunsui is now a part of the expanded city of Tsubame.

As of April 1, 2005, the town had an estimated population of 15,130. The total area was 39.61 km^{2}.

On March 20, 2006, Bunsui, along with the town of Yoshida (also from Nishikanbara District), was merged into the expanded city of Tsubame.

The town plays host to the annual Spring Oiran Dochu festival.

== Transportation ==
=== Railway ===
- JR East - Echigo Line
  - Bunsui

=== Highway ===
- National Route 116
