= Iwamuro, Niigata =

Coordinates: 37°44′15.00″N 138°50′20.68″E

Iwamuro 岩室村
- Former municipality
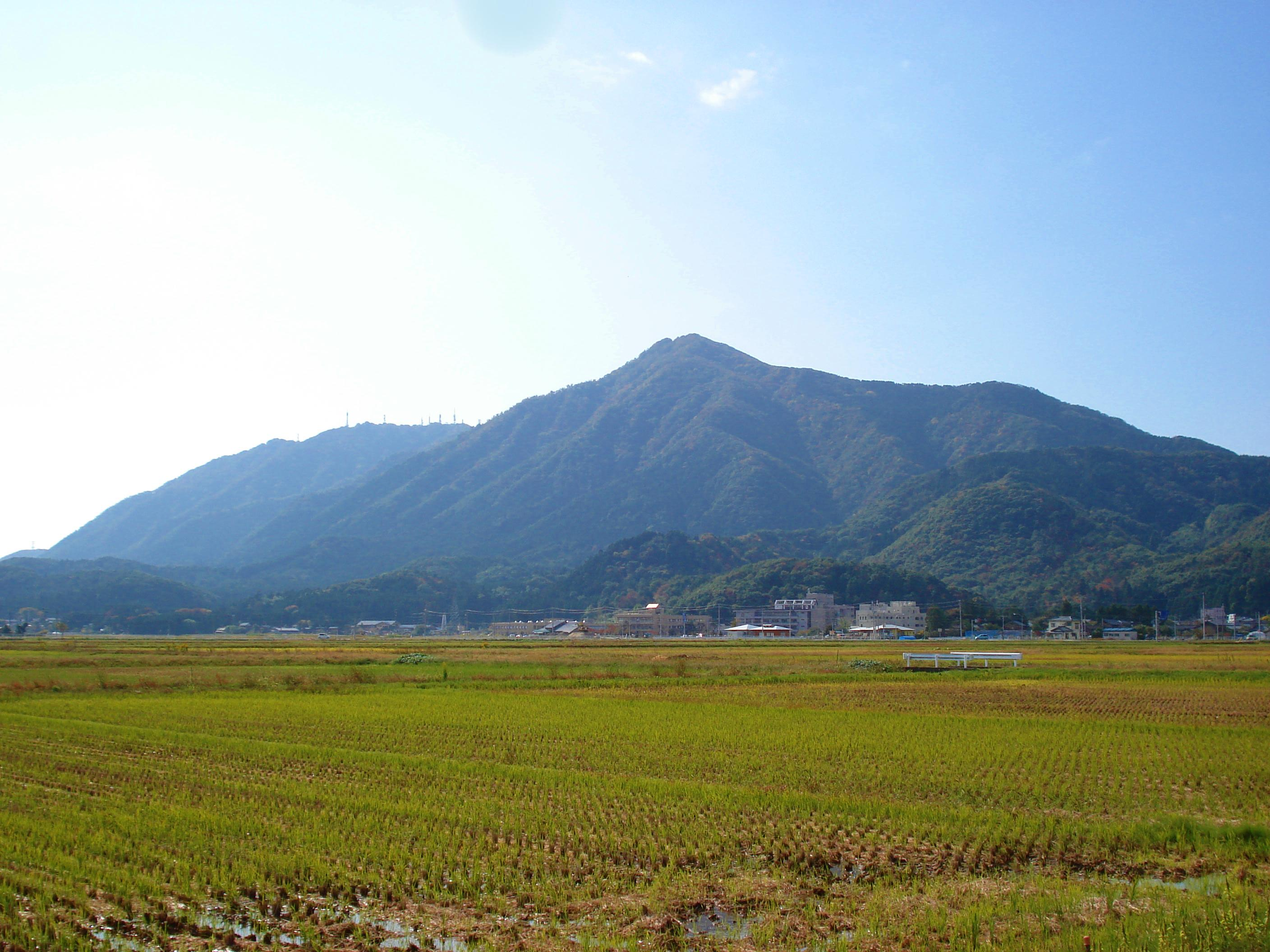
- Iwamuro onsens beneath the 634m-high Yahiko Mountain in Niigata, Japan

- Flag Emblem

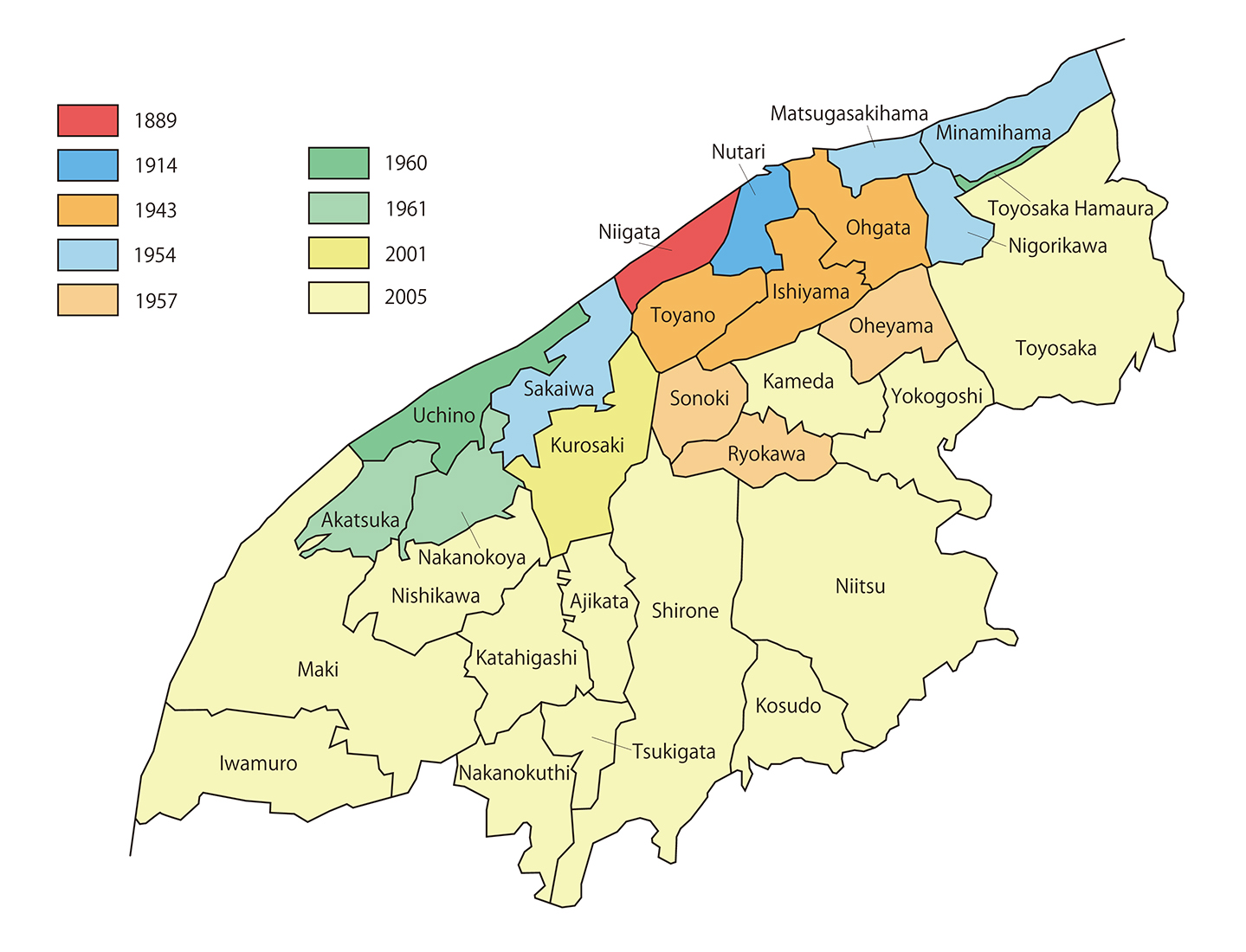
- Location of Iwamuro in Niigata Prefecture
- Country: Japan
- Region: Hokuriku
- Prefecture: Niigata Prefecture
- District: Nishikanbara District
- Merged: March 21, 2005 (now part of Niigata)

Area
  - Total: 36.11 km^{2} (13.94 sq mi)

Population (2005)
  - Total: 9,865
- Time zone: UTC+09:00 (JST)

Iwamuro (岩室村, Iwamuro-mura) was a village located in Nishikanbara District, Niigata Prefecture, Japan. The area is famous for onsen near Yahiko mountain. Farming remains the predominant industry in the area. It is served by National Route 116 and Niigata Route 55.

On April 1, 2007, Iwamuro became part of Nishikan-ku ward (西蒲区, Nishikan-ku?) of Niigata city.

== History ==
Iwamuro, which means 'stone' and 'room' in kanji, lies at the foot of Yahiko Mountain (弥彦山, Yahiko yama). It was originally surrounded by lagoons and marshes before major irrigation work was undertaken in the late 19th and early 20th century. Nevertheless, people have been coming to the area since the Edo period to bathe in naturally-created geothermal waters. Currently there are more than 20 onsens which range in price from cheap (500 yen) to expensive (+20,000 yen). Iwamuro's fame stems from its waters 'perceived' healing properties. An apocryphal tale tells of a farmer's wife who found a goose with a broken leg. She put it in a hot sulphur-smelling pool near her home. The goose's leg got better. The farmer and his wife then became very rich by opening the first onsen in Iwamuro.

Behind Yahiko mountain lies the fishing village of Maze (間瀬). During the Meiji period copper mining flourished in the foothills north west of Maze. At its peak, 60 tons of copper were being extracted each month. Output decreased in the 1920s but in 1943, mining was temporarily revived. Work ended at the end of the war.

During the period of the Tokugawa shogunate, Maze was one of the ferry points to the banishment island of Sado. A small watch tower was sited just of north of the village. Samurai were tasked with guarding the shore and questioning all who landed from boats. South of the harbour is Maze Beach, which is popular with surfers. North of the village is the Nihonkai Maze Circuit which holds regular weekend meetings throughout the summer months, attracting sports car drivers from across Japan.

== Geography ==
The sulphurous waters in Iwamuro rise from depths of up to 2 miles (3.2 km). They have an average surface temperature of 24.3 °C and are highly saturated in mineral salts. Iwamuro lies on a fault zone between Yahiko mountain and the bedrock beneath the Niigata Plain. In 2006, due to the number of onsens in the area, additional bore holes were drilled to a depth of 0.75 miles (1.21 km).

Rice farming is predominant throughout the area although there are several dairy and pig-rearing farms. As the village is on the Niigata plain, the rich soil deposited by the Shinano and Agano River make it ideal for agriculture.

== Demographics ==
As of 2005, the village had an estimated population of 9,917 and a density of 274.63 persons per km^{2}. Its total area was 36.11 km^{2}.

On March 21, 2005, Iwamuro, along with the cities of Niitsu, Shirone and Toyosaka, the towns of Kameda, Kosudo and Yokogoshi (all from Nakakanbara District), the town of Nishikawa, and the villages of Ajikata, Katahigashi, Nakanokuchi and Tsukigata (all from Nishikanbara District), was merged into the expanded city of Niigata.

Since Iwamuro became part of Nishikan-ku ward (西蒲区, Nishikan-ku) there have been several changes in the area. For instance local government services have moved to Maki, Iwamuro's farming cooperative opened a new rice storage centre centralising grain collection for the entire area In April 2008 after closing six independent silos and the fishing cooperatives of Maze and Niigata city have both merged, although the fish market and boat repair yard both remain open.

Iwamuro also has two independent sake makers both located in the heart of the old district at Iwamuro-onsen. Products are sold locally and are of a higher quality than commercially-made rice wine. There are two elementary schools and one Junior High School within Iwamuro.

Iwamuro, as an area, incorporates more than 20 hamlets, villages and townships:

- Hiso
- Sakai
- Hashimoto
- Iwamuro-onsen
- Ishize
- Kubota
- Saragase
- Kanaike

- Minami-yachi
- Kitano
- Shitatori
- Nishinagashima
- Tokozone
- Araya
- Oburajima
- Takabatake

- Nishifunakoshi
- Katakami
- Nishinaka
- Natsui
- Wano
- Maze
- Kami-Wano

== See also ==
- Niigata City
- Nishikan-ku, Niigata
- Maki, Niigata (Nishikanbara)
- Iwamuro Station
