= Kōnan-ku, Niigata =

Ward of Niigata City in Chūbu, Japan

Kōnan-ku 江南区
- Ward
- Kōnan Ward
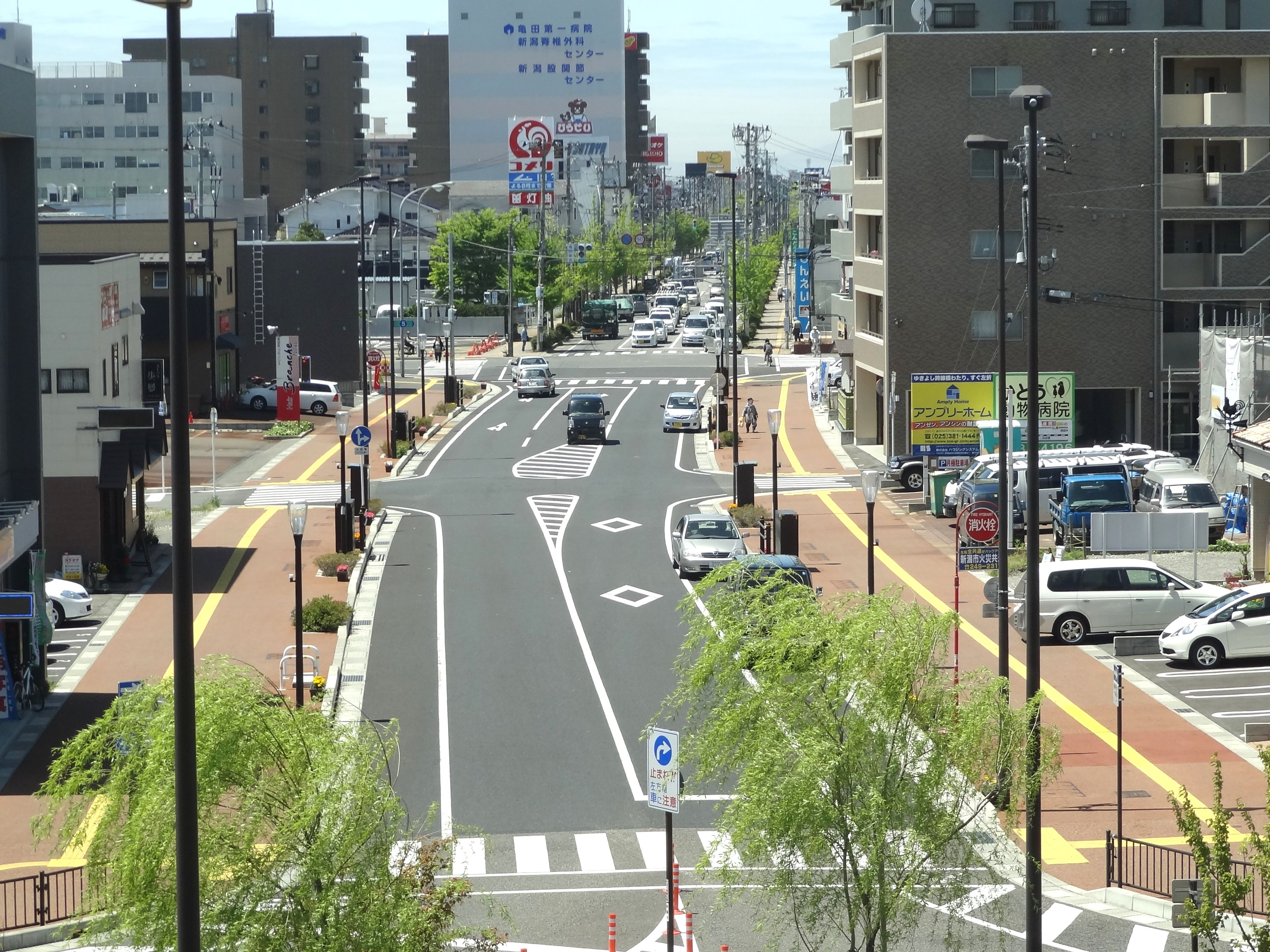
- Kameda neighbourhood of Kōnan-ku

- Location of Kōnan-ku in Niigata City

- Coordinates: 37°52′3.5″N 139°5′38.5″E
- Country: Japan
- Region: Kōshin'etsu, Hokuriku (Chūbu)
- Prefecture: Niigata
- City: Niigata

Area
  - Total: 75.42 km^{2} (29.12 sq mi)

Population (September 1, 2016)
  - Total: 68,413
  - Density: 907.1/km^{2} (2,349/sq mi)
- Time zone: UTC+9 (Japan Standard Time)
- Address: 3-4-5 Izumi-Chō, Kōnan-ku, Niigata-shi, Niigata-ken 950-0195
- Phone number: 025-383-1000
- Website: Official website

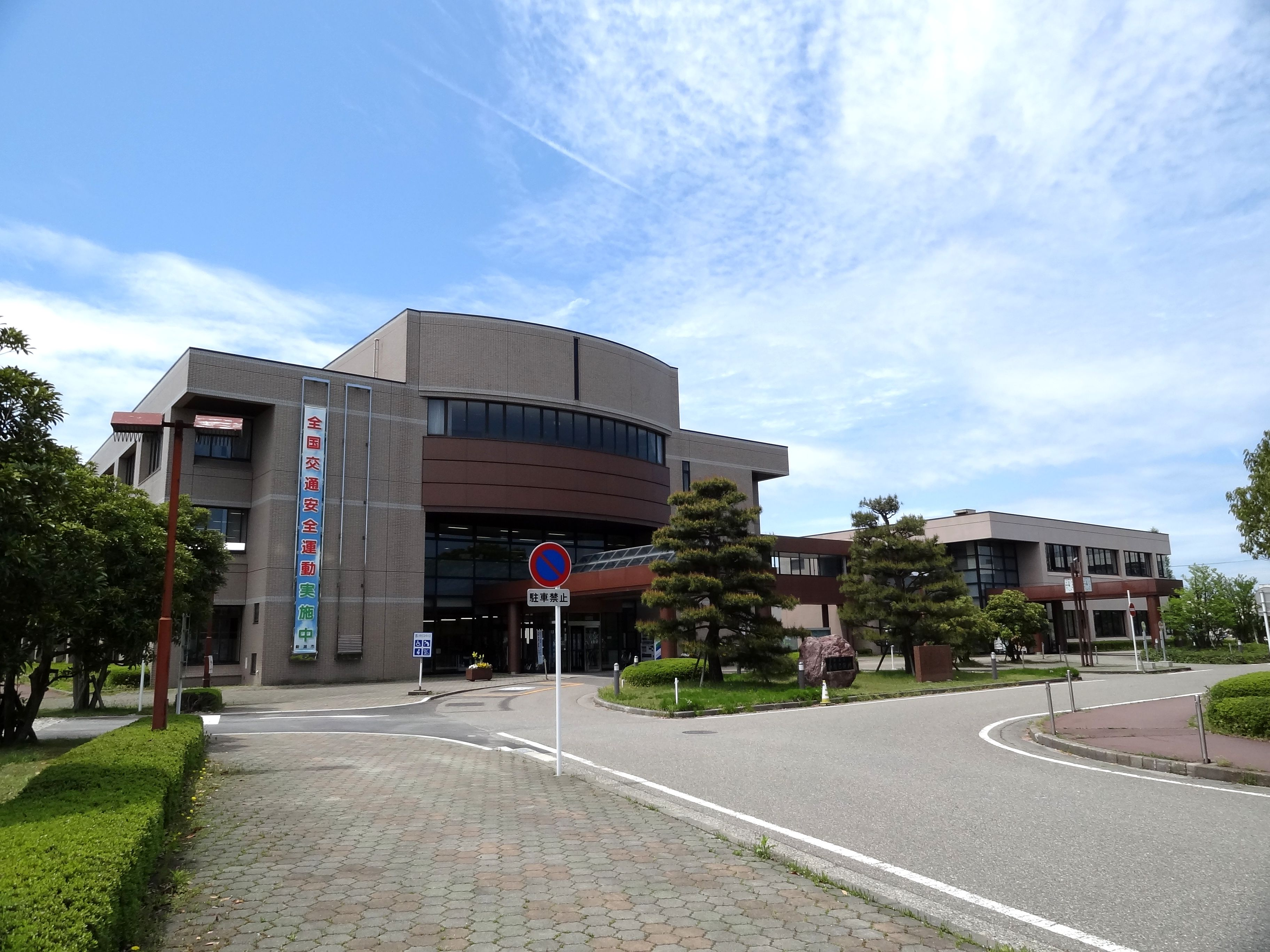
Kōnan Ward Office

Kōnan-ku (江南区, Kōnan-ku) is one of the eight wards of Niigata City, Niigata Prefecture, in the Hokuriku region of Japan. As of 1 September 2018, the ward had an estimated population of 68,413 in 27,027 households and a population density of 913 persons per km^{2}. The total area of the ward was 75.42 square kilometres (29.12 sq mi).

== Geography ==
Kōnan-ku is located in an inland region of north-central Niigata Prefecture, near the centre of Niigata City, directly south of the central Chūō-ku. The ward is bordered by Agano River, Koagano River, Shinano River, and the Nihonkai-Tōhoku Expressway.

=== Neighboring municipalities/wards ===
- Niigata Prefecture
  - Kita-ku, Niigata
  - Higashi-ku, Niigata
  - Chūō-ku, Niigata
  - Akiha-ku, Niigata
  - Minami-ku, Niigata
  - Nishi-ku, Niigata
  - Agano

== History ==
The area of present-day Kōnan-ku was part of ancient Echigo Province. The modern town of Kameda and the village of Yokogoshi were established on April 1, 1889, within Nakakanbara District, Niigata with the establishment of the municipalities system.

Yokogoshi was raised to town status on November 1, 1996. The city of Niigata annexed Kameda and Yokogoshi on March 21, 2005. Niigata became a government-designated city on April 1, 2007, and was divided into wards, with the new Kōnan Ward consisting of the former town of Kameda, village of Yokogoshi, and the Sonoki (曽野木), Ryokawa (両川) and Oeyama (大江山) neighbourhoods of southern Niigata City.

== Education ==
Kōnan-ku has 11 public elementary schools and six public middle schools operated by the Niigata city government. There is one public high school operated by the Niigata Prefectural Board of Education (Niigata Kōyō High School), and one private combined middle/high school (Niigata Meikun High School).

== Transportation ==
=== Railway ===
JR East - Shin'etsu Main Line

- Kameda

=== Transit bus ===
- Transit bus operated by Niigata Kotsu
  - S2 / S6 / S7 / S8 / S9

=== Highway ===
- Nihonkai-Tōhoku Expressway
- Hokuriku Expressway
- Ban-etsu Expressway
- National Route 49
- National Route 403

== Local attractions ==
- Northern Culture Museum
- AEON Mall Niigata Minami, shopping center
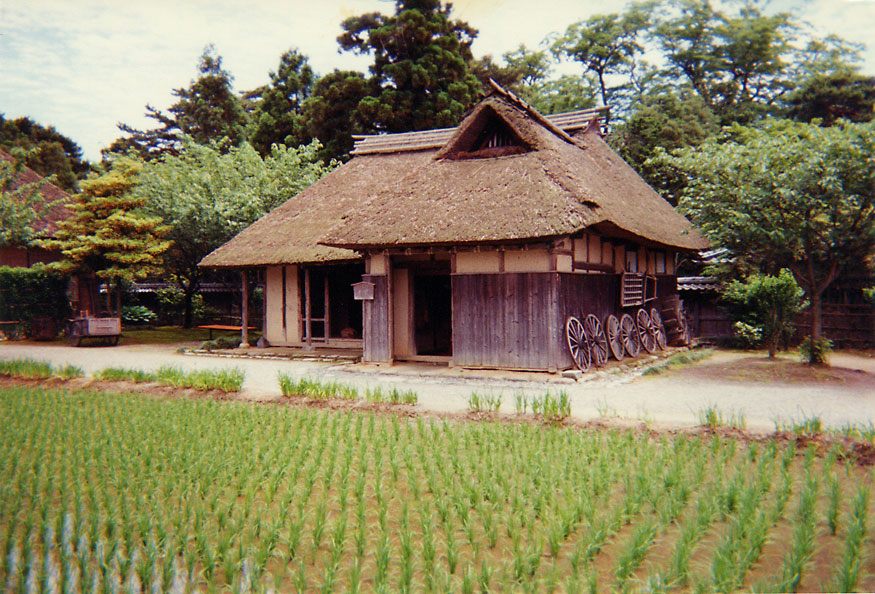
Northern Culture Museum

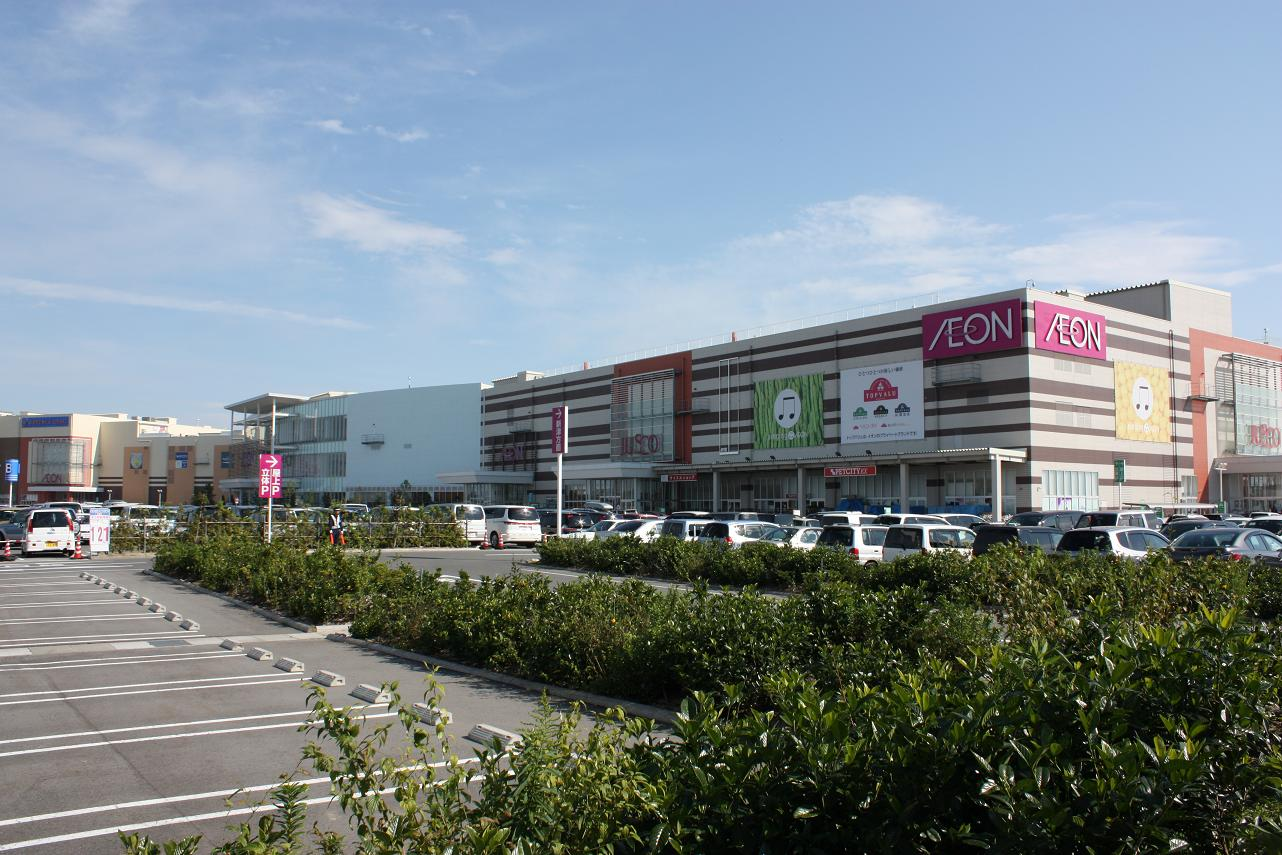
Aeon Mall Niigata Minami, shopping center
