= Ajikata, Niigata =

Ajikata 味方村
- Former municipality
- Flag Emblem

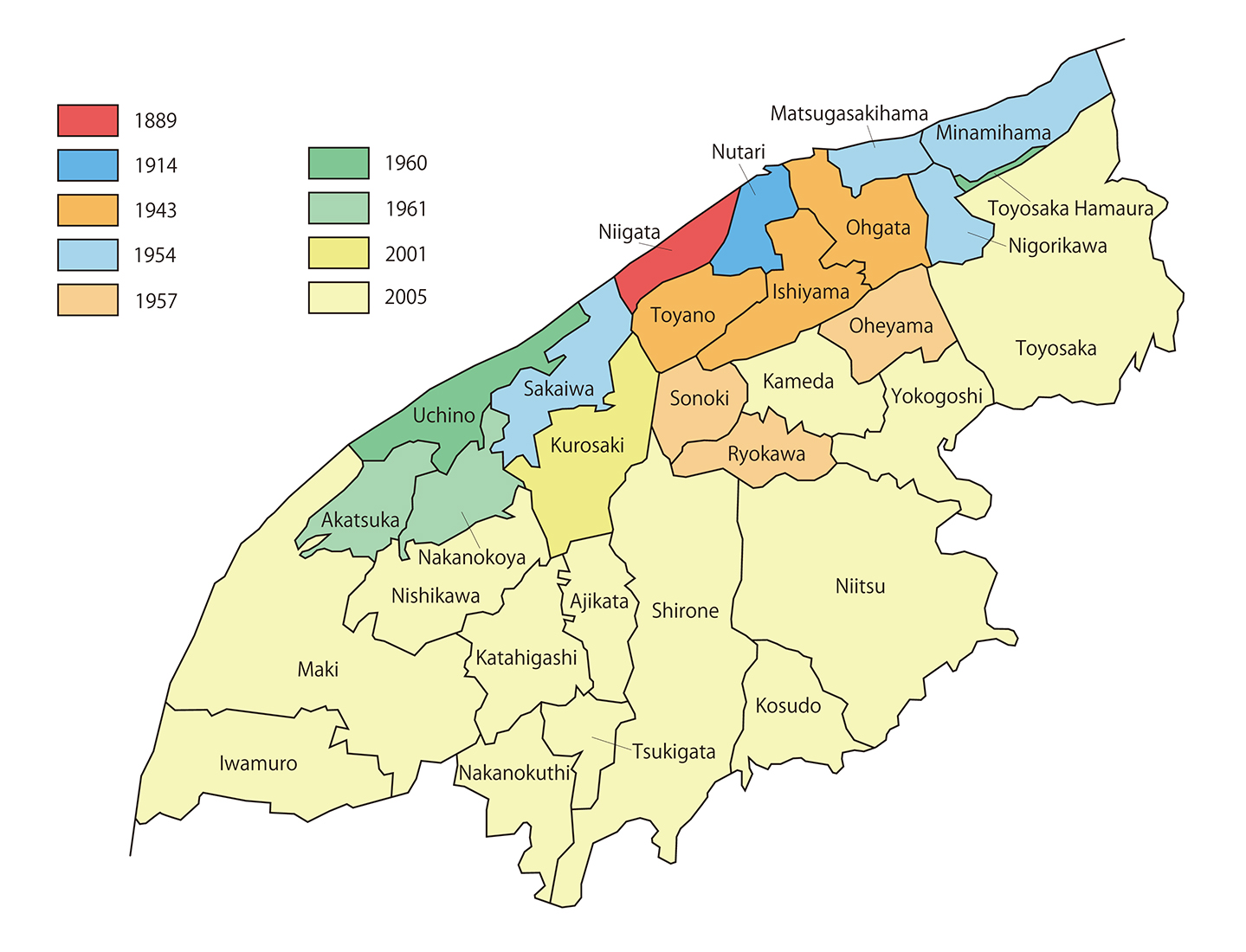
- Location of Ajikata in Niigata Prefecture
- Country: Japan
- Region: Hokuriku
- Prefecture: Niigata Prefecture
- District: Nishikanbara District
- Merged: March 21, 2005 (now part of Niigata)

Area
  - Total: 14.44 km^{2} (5.58 sq mi)

Population (2005)
  - Total: 4,685
- Time zone: UTC+09:00 (JST)
- Symbols
- Tree: Zelkova

Ajikata (味方村, Ajikata-mura) was a village located in Nishikanbara District, Niigata Prefecture, Japan.

As of 2005, the village had an estimated population of 4,506 and a density of 312.05 persons per km^{2}. The total area was 14.44 km^{2}.

On March 21, 2005, Ajikata, along with the cities of Niitsu, Shirone and Toyosaka, the towns of Kameda, Kosudo and Yokogoshi (all from Nakakanbara District), the town of Nishikawa, and the villages of Iwamuro, Katahigashi, Nakanokuchi and Tsukigata (all from Nishikanbara District), was merged into the expanded city of Niigata. As of April 1, 2007, the area is part of the Minami-ku ward.
