= Nakanokuchi, Niigata =

Coordinates: 37°42′35.31″N 138°58′7.48″E

Nakanokuchi 中之口村
- Former municipality
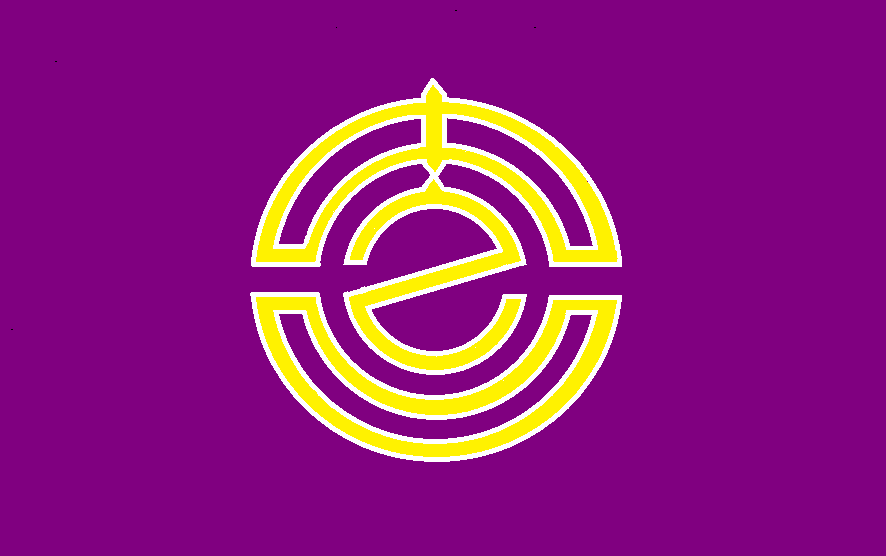
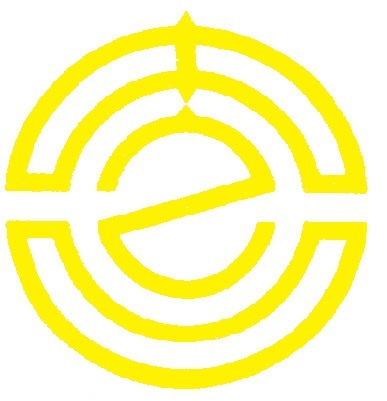
- Flag Seal

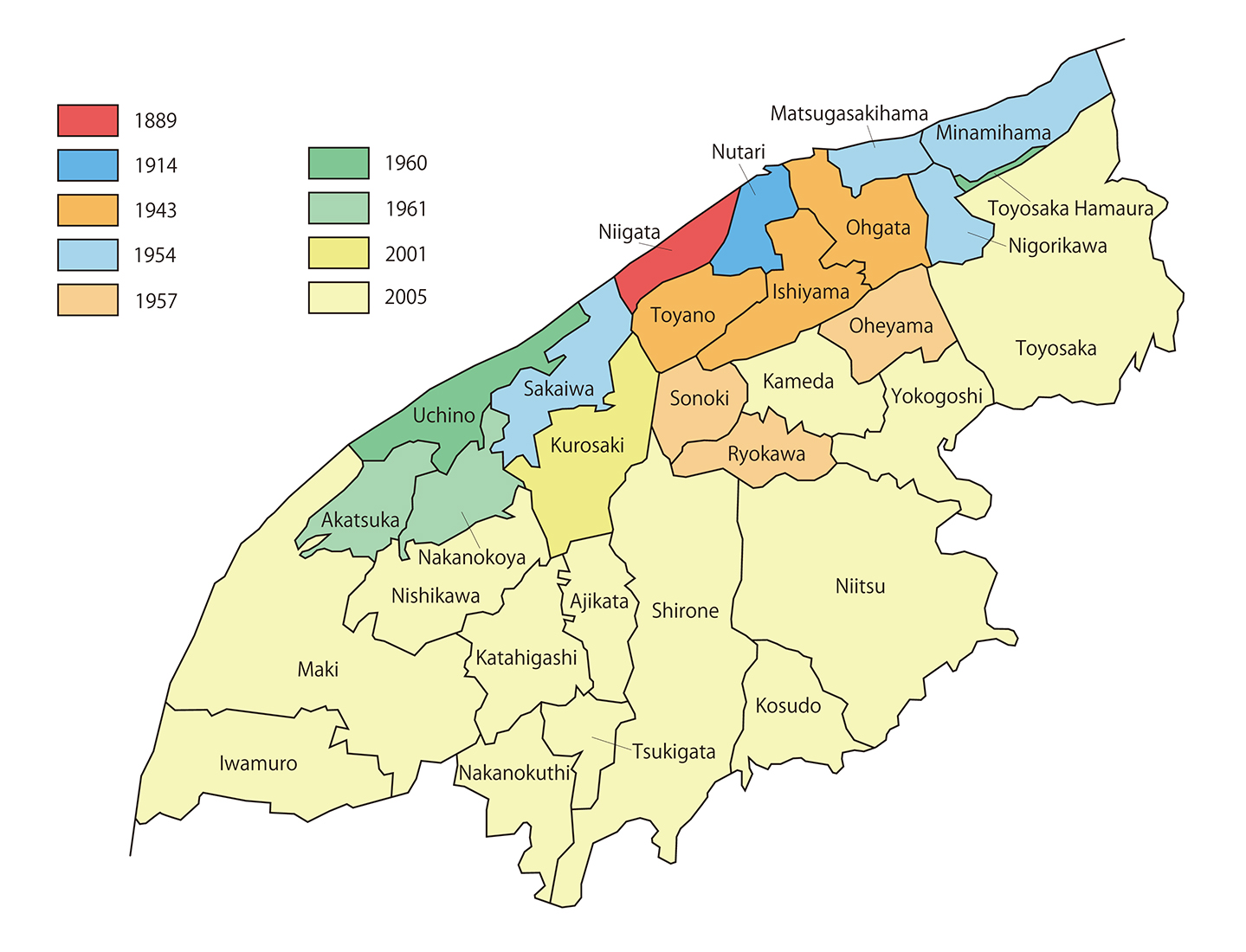
- Location of Nakanokuchi in Niigata Prefecture
- Country: Japan
- Region: Hokuriku
- Prefecture: Niigata Prefecture
- District: Nishikanbara District
- Merged: March 21, 2005 (now part of Niigata)

Area
  - Total: 20.16 km^{2} (7.78 sq mi)

Population (2005)
  - Total: 6,406
- Time zone: UTC+09:00 (JST)
- Symbols
- Flower: Lilium
- Tree: Pinus thunbergii

Nakanokuchi (中之口村, Nakanokuchi-mura) was a village located in Nishikanbara District, Niigata Prefecture, Japan.

As of 2005, the village had an estimated population of 6,613 and a density of 328.03 persons per km^{2}. The total area was 20.16 km^{2}.

On March 21, 2005, Nakanokuchi, along with the cities of Niitsu, Shirone and Toyosaka, the towns of Kameda, Kosudo and Yokogoshi (all from Nakakanbara District), the town of Nishikawa, and the villages of Ajikata, Iwamuro, Katahigashi and Tsukigata (all from Nishikanbara District), was merged into the expanded city of Niigata. As of April 1, 2007, the area is now part of Nishikan-ku ward (西蒲区, Nishikan-ku).

== Sumo Champion ==
The village is the birthplace of Haguroyama Masaji (羽黒山 政司, November 18, 1914 - October 14, 1969) who was sumo's 36th yokozuna. Haguroyama earned the rank in May 1941 and held the title for twelve years and three months the longest stay at sumo's highest rank until surpassed by Hakuhō in 2019.

During his career Haguroyama won seven top division championships and was runner-up on six other occasions.

In Nakanokuchi, there is a museum dedicated to Haguroyama and a bronze statue of the famous wrestler wearing his shimenawa (the knotted rope indicating his rank as yokozuna).
