= Japan National Route 116 =

National highway in Niigata Prefecture, Japan

National Route 116
- 国道116号
- Japan National Route 116 highlighted in red

Route information
- Length: 78.9 km (49.0 mi)
- Existed: 1953–present

Major junctions
- South end: National Route 8 in Kashiwazaki, Niigata
- National Route 352; National Route 289; National Route 460; Hokuriku Expressway; National Route 8 / National Route 17; National Route 402
- North end: National Route 7 in Chūō-ku, Niigata

Location
- Country: Japan

Highway system
- National highways of Japan; Expressways of Japan
← National Route 115	→ National Route 117

National Route 116 (国道116号, Kokudō Hyaku jūrokugō) is a national highway of Japan that traverses the prefecture of Niigata in a southwest–northeast routing. It connects the city of Kashiwazaki in south-central Niigata Prefecture to the prefecture's capital city, Niigata, to the north along the Sea of Japan coastline. It has a total length of 78.9 kilometers (49.0 mi).

== Route description ==
National Route 116 mainly functions as an alternative route to National Route 8 and the Hokuriku Expressway between the cities of Kashiwazaki and Niigata. It runs closer to the coastline of the Sea of Japan, while the aforementioned highways take a more inland route. It also takes a more rural route between Kashiwazaki and Niigata. While National Route 8 travels through the center of the cities Nagaoka, Mitsuke, and Sanjō, National Route 116 passes only through the center of the city of Tsubame. A 7.9-kilometer-long (4.9 mi) section of the highway in Niigata makes up the southernmost section of the Niigata Bypass, a limited-access road that travels along the eastern edge of the city's center.

== History ==
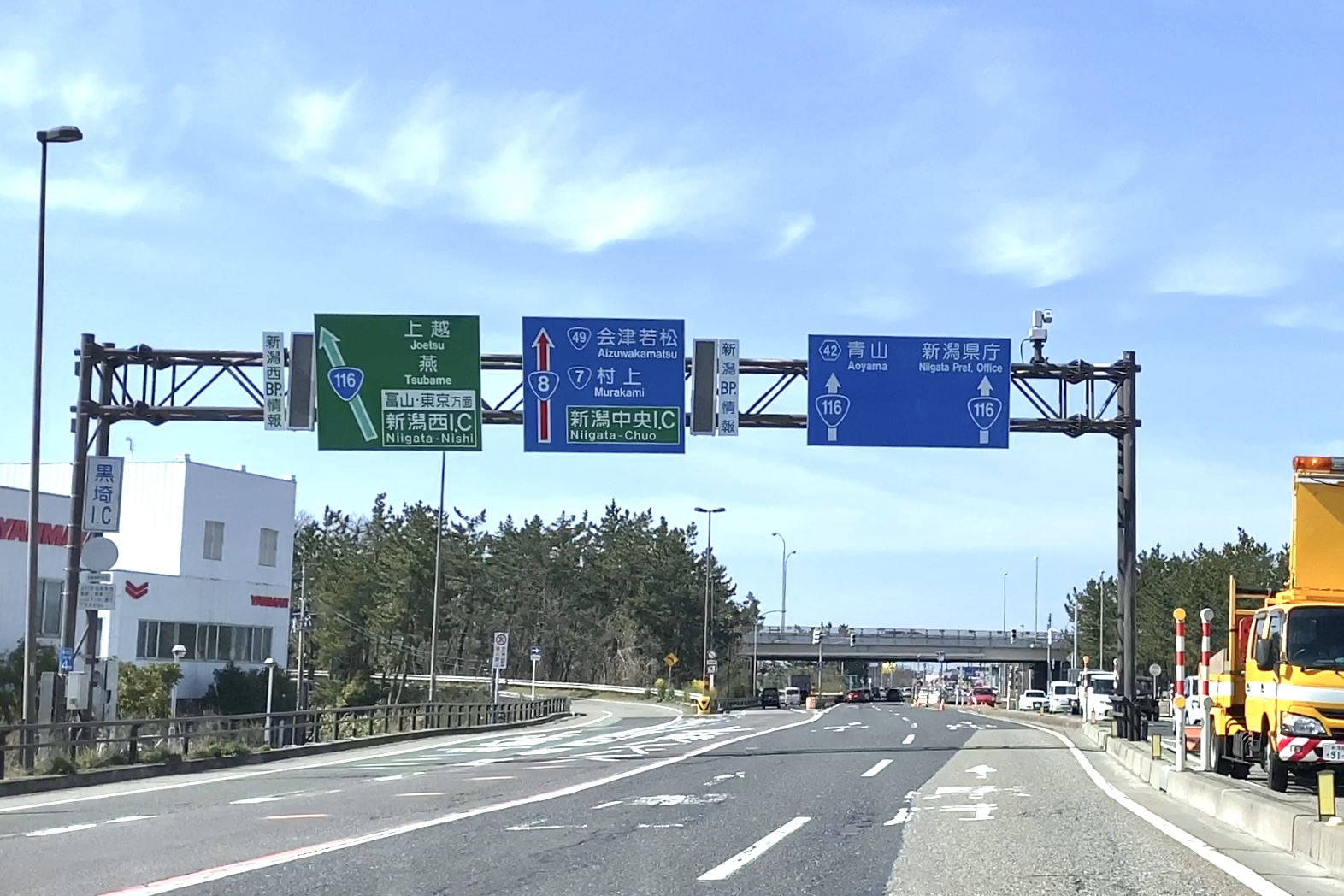
National Route 116 at Kurosaki Interchange in Nishi-ku, Niigata

National Route 116 was established by the Cabinet of Japan on 18 May 1954 as Secondary National Route 116 between the cities of Kashiwazaki and Niigata. The highway was reclassified as General National Route 116 on 1 April 1965. The highway was heavily damaged in Kashiwazaki during the 2007 Chūetsu offshore earthquake. Several sections of the roadway collapsed or were displaced during the earthquake; however, local authorities were able to repair the damage by the end of the day after the earthquake. On 1 April 2008, the highway's route through Niigata was shifted onto the limited-access Niigata Bypass.

== Major junctions ==
The route lies entirely within Niigata Prefecture.

Location	km	mi	Destinations	Notes
Kashiwazaki	0.0	0.0	National Route 8 – Nagaoka, Itoigawa, Jōetsu	Southern terminus
Kariwa	4.0	2.5	Niigata Prefecture Route 73 – to National Route 352, Kariwa Station, Sochi	
Kashiwazaki	6.5	4.0	Niigata Prefecture Route 23 west – to National Route 352, Miyagawa	Southern end of Niigata Prefecture Route 23 concurrency
Kashiwazaki	7.0	4.3	Niigata Prefecture Route 369 south	
Kashiwazaki	7.5	4.7	Niigata Prefecture Route 574 north – Raihai Station	
Kashiwazaki	7.9	4.9	Niigata Prefecture Route 23 east – to Hokuriku Expressway	Northern end of Niigata Prefecture Route 23 concurrency
Kashiwazaki	9.0	5.6	Niigata Prefecture Route 393 – Shiiya, Nagaoka, Ishiji Beach	
Kashiwazaki	12.6	7.8	Niigata Prefecture Route 48 – Nagaoka, Ishiji Beach	Interchange
Izumozaki	16.8	10.4	Niigata Prefecture Route 336 west	
Izumozaki	18.7	11.6	National Route 352 – to Hokuriku Expressway, Nagaoka, Mishima, Roadside station "Tenryo no Sato", Izumozaki Beach	
Izumozaki	20.8	12.9	Niigata Prefecture Route 193 – Inohana Beach	
Nagaoka	23.8	14.8	Niigata Prefecture Route 574 south	Southern end of Niigata Prefecture Route 574 concurrency
Nagaoka	24.0	14.9	Niigata Prefecture Route 192 – Teradomari Beach, Yoita	
Nagaoka	25.1	15.6	Niigata Prefecture Route 574 north – Shimazaki	Northern end of Niigata Prefecture Route 574 concurrency
Nagaoka	27.7	17.2	Niigata Prefecture Route 169 – Teradomari Port, Nagaoka, Washima Branch Office	
Nagaoka	29.4	18.3	Niigata Prefecture Route 574 – to Hokuriku Expressway, Yoita, Kirihara Station	Interchange
Nagaoka	30.8	19.1	Niigata Prefecture Route 574 south – Teradomari Port	
Nagaoka	33.4	20.8	Niigata Prefecture Route 22 – Teradomari Port, Nagaoka, Yoita, Echigonanaura Seaside Line	
Nagaoka	34.1	21.2	Niigata Prefecture Route 549	Interchange
Tsubame	35.0	21.7	Niigata Prefecture Route 374 north – Bunsui Station	Interchange
Tsubame	35.6	22.1	Niigata Prefecture Route 18 – Jizōdoō, Sanjō	
Tsubame	40.0	24.9	Niigata Prefecture Route 68 west	Southern end of Niigata Prefecture Route 68 concurrency
Tsubame	40.9	25.4	Niigata Prefecture Route 68 east – Sanjō	Northern end of Niigata Prefecture Route 68 concurrency
Tsubame	43.4	27.0	National Route 289 east – to Hokuriku Expressway, Sanjō; Niigata Prefecture Route 29 west – Seaside Line, Yahiko	Southern end of National Route 289 concurrency
Tsubame	44.8	27.8	Niigata Prefecture Route 250 – Iwamuro, Tsukigata, Nakanokuchi	
Niigata	48.3	30.0	Niigata Prefecture Route 55 – Iwamuro, Kamo, Nakanokuchi	
Niigata	51.2	31.8	National Route 460 (Suwagi Bypass) – to Hokuriku Expressway, National Route 8, National Route 402, Shirone, Iwamuro Spa, Echigonanaura Seaside Line	
Niigata	51.9	32.2	National Route 460 – Maki Station, Shirone	National Route 460 truck traffic must use the Suwagi Bypass
Niigata	53.0	32.9	Niigata Prefecture Route 380 – to National Route 402, Seaside Line, Endo	
Niigata	56.8	35.3	Niigata Prefecture Route 66 – Sone, Yokodo, Hataya Industrial Estate	
Niigata	58.2	36.2	Niigata Prefecture Route 46 – to Hokuriku Expressway, Sone, Nishikawa 1st Industrial Center	
Niigata	59.2	36.8	Niigata Prefecture Route 46 west – Sakata, Akatsuka	
Niigata	60.2	37.4	Niigata Prefecture Route 374 south – Hokonoki	
Niigata	69.6	43.2	Hokuriku Expressway – to Nihonkai-Tōhoku Expressway, Kan-etsu Expressway, Ban-etsu Expressway, Toyama, Tokyo, Aizuwakamatsu, Murakami	Niigata-nishi Interchange (E8 exit 41)
Niigata	71.2	44.2	National Route 8 / National Route 17 – to National Route 7, National Route 49, Nagaoka, Sanjō, Aizuwakamatsu, Murakami, Shibata	Kurosaki Interchange
Niigata	71.8	44.6	Niigata Prefecture Route 42 north – Aoyama	
Niigata	72.5	45.0	Niigata Prefecture Route 1 south – Sanjō, Kosudo	Southern end of Niigata Prefecture Route 1 concurrency
Niigata	74.1	46.0	Niigata Prefecture Route 51 east – Niigata Station	
Niigata	74.8	46.5	Niigata Prefecture Route 1 north – Niigata Station, Sado Sea Line; Niigata Prefecture Route 16 east – to Ban-etsu Expressway, National Route 8	Northern end of Niigata Prefecture Route 1 concurrency, southern end of Niigata Prefecture Route 16 concurrency
Niigata	75.5	46.9	Niigata Prefecture Route 16 east – to National Route 8	Northern end of Niigata Prefecture Route 16 concurrency
Niigata	75.8	47.1	National Route 402 south – Kashiwazaki, Maki	Southern end of National Route 402 concurrency
Niigata	77.8	48.3	Niigata Prefecture Route 164 – to National Route 8, Prefecture Office, Ground Stadium	
Niigata	78.9	49.0	National Route 7 north / National Route 8 south / National Route 17 south / National Route 113 east / National Route 289 ends / National Route 350 west / National Route 402 ends – Bandai Bridge, Niigata Station	Northern terminus, highway continues north as National Route 7, northern end of concurrency with National Route 289 and 402
1.000 mi = 1.609 km; 1.000 km = 0.621 mi: Concurrency terminus; Incomplete access; Route transition
