= Nishikawa, Niigata =

Nishikawa 西川町
- Former municipality
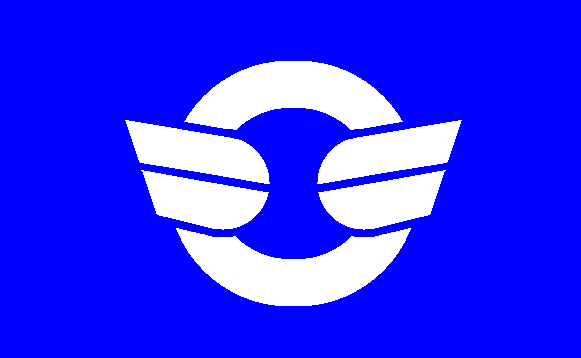
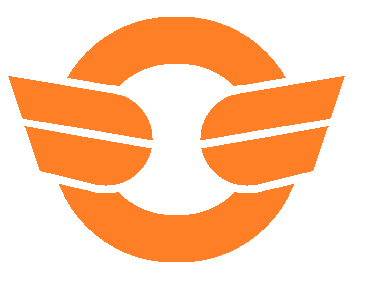
- Flag Seal

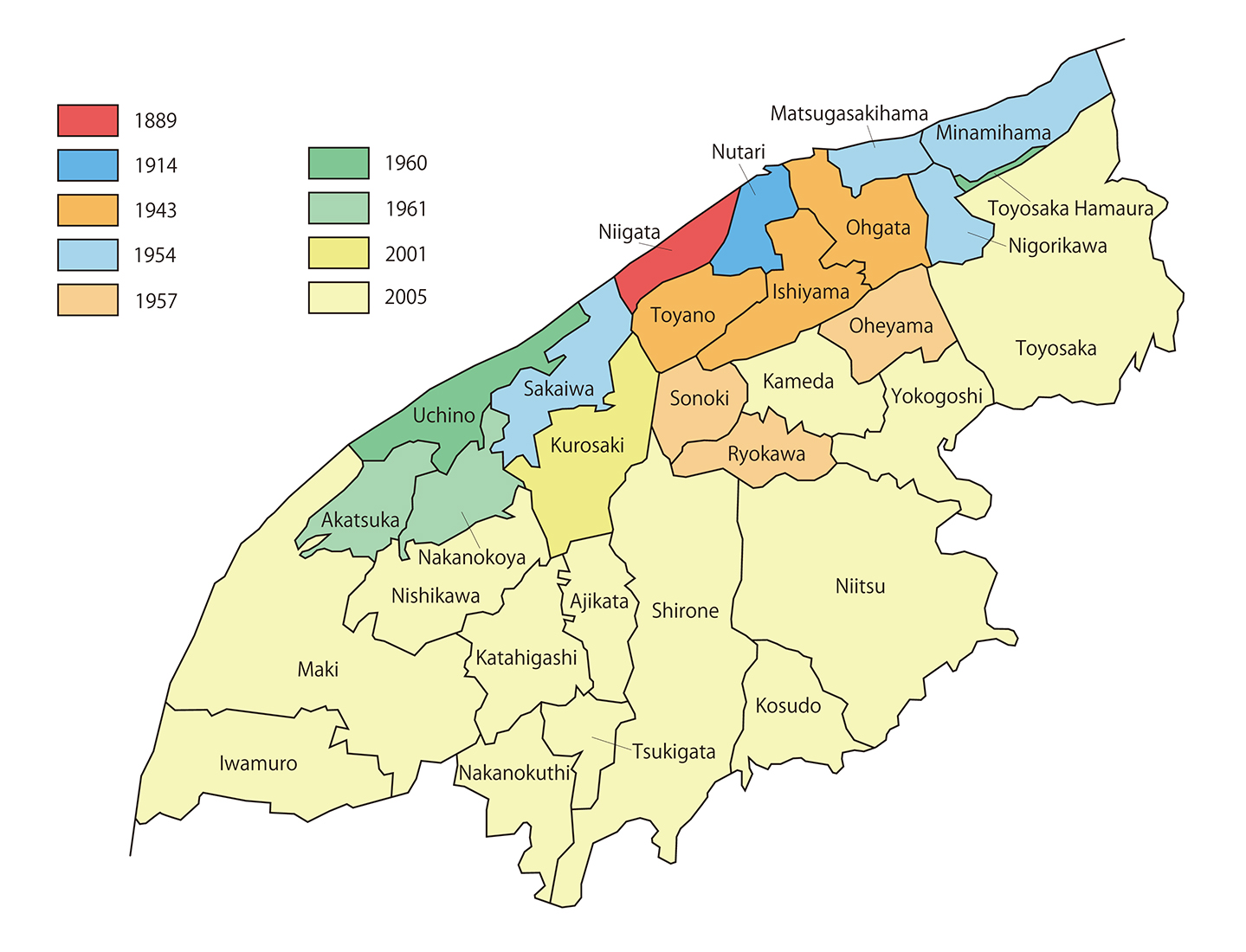
- Location of Nishikawa in Niigata Prefecture
- Country: Japan
- Region: Hokuriku
- Prefecture: Niigata Prefecture
- District: Nishikanbara District
- Merged: March 21, 2005 (now part of Niigata)

Area
  - Total: 24.76 km^{2} (9.56 sq mi)

Population (2005)
  - Total: 12,243
- Time zone: UTC+09:00 (JST)

Nishikawa (西川町, Nishikawa-machi) was a town located in Nishikanbara District, Niigata Prefecture, Japan.

As of 2003, the town had an estimated population of 12,277 and a density of 495.84 persons per km^{2}. The total area was 24.76 km^{2}.

On March 21, 2005, Nishikawa, along with the cities of Niitsu, Shirone and Toyosaka, the towns of Kameda, Kosudo and Yokogoshi (all from Nakakanbara District), and the villages of Ajikata, Iwamuro, Katahigashi, Nakanokuchi and Tsukigata (all from Nishikanbara District), was merged into the expanded city of Niigata. As of April 1, 2007, the area is part of the Nishi-ku ward.
