= Katahigashi, Niigata =

Katahigashi 潟東村
- Former municipality
- Interactive map of Katahigashi
- Country: Japan
- Region: Hokuriku
- Prefecture: Niigata Prefecture
- District: Nishikanbara District
- Merged: March 21, 2005 (now part of Niigata)

Area
  - Total: 23.96 km^{2} (9.25 sq mi)

Population (2005)
  - Total: 6,322
- Time zone: UTC+09:00 (JST)
- Symbols
- Flower: Salvia splendens

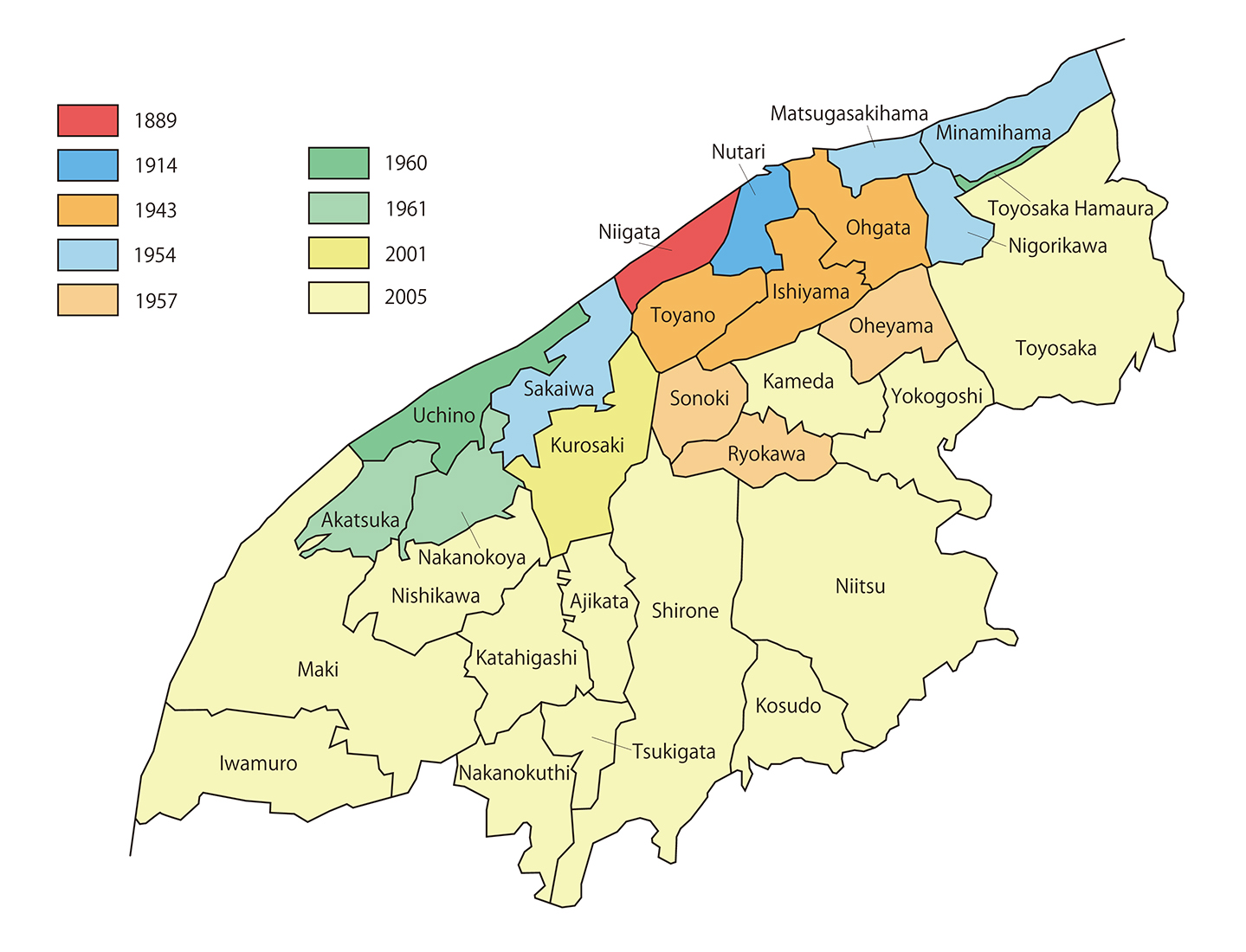
Mergers of Niigata

Katahigashi (潟東村, Katahigashi-mura) was a village located in Nishikanbara District, Niigata Prefecture, Japan.

As of 2003, the village had an estimated population of 6,347 and a density of 264.90 persons per km^{2}. The total area was 23.96 km^{2}.

On March 21, 2005, Katahigashi, along with the cities of Niitsu, Shirone and Toyosaka, the towns of Kameda, Kosudo and Yokogoshi (all from Nakakanbara District), the town of Nishikawa, and the villages of Ajikata, Iwamuro, Nakanokuchi and Tsukigata (all from Nishikanbara District), was merged into the expanded city of Niigata. As of April 1, 2007, the area is part of the Nishi-ku ward.
