= Toyosaka, Niigata =

Coordinates: 37°54′58.5″N 139°13′6.9″E

Toyosaka 豊栄市
- Former municipality
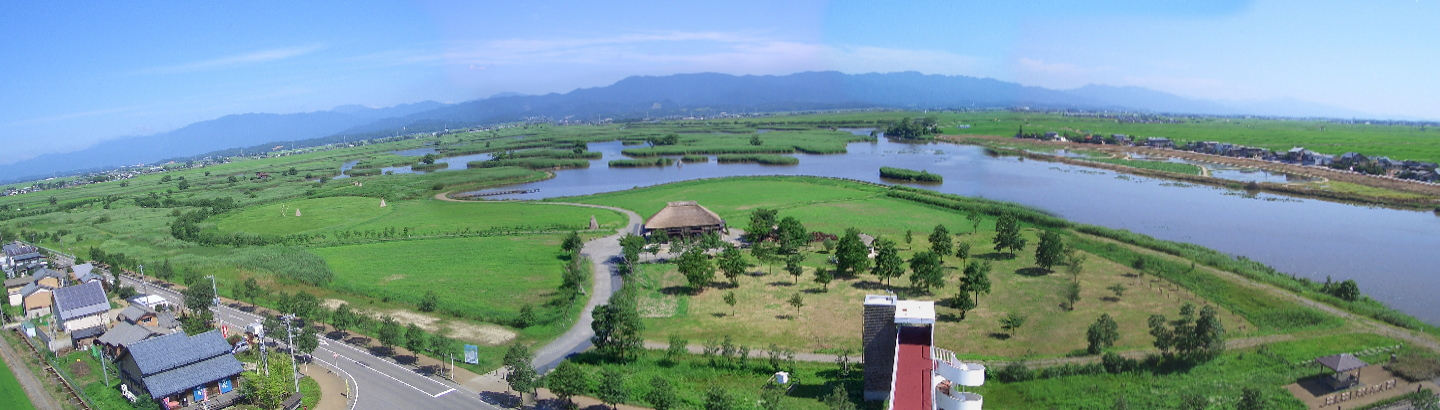
- Interactive map of Toyosaka
- Country: Japan
- Region: Hokuriku
- Prefecture: Niigata Prefecture
- Merged: March 21, 2005 (now part of Niigata)

Area
  - Total: 76.85 km^{2} (29.67 sq mi)

Population (2005)
  - Total: 49,273
- Time zone: UTC+09:00 (JST)
- Symbols
- Bird: Middenorff's bean goose
- Flower: Gorgon plant
- Tree: Zelkova

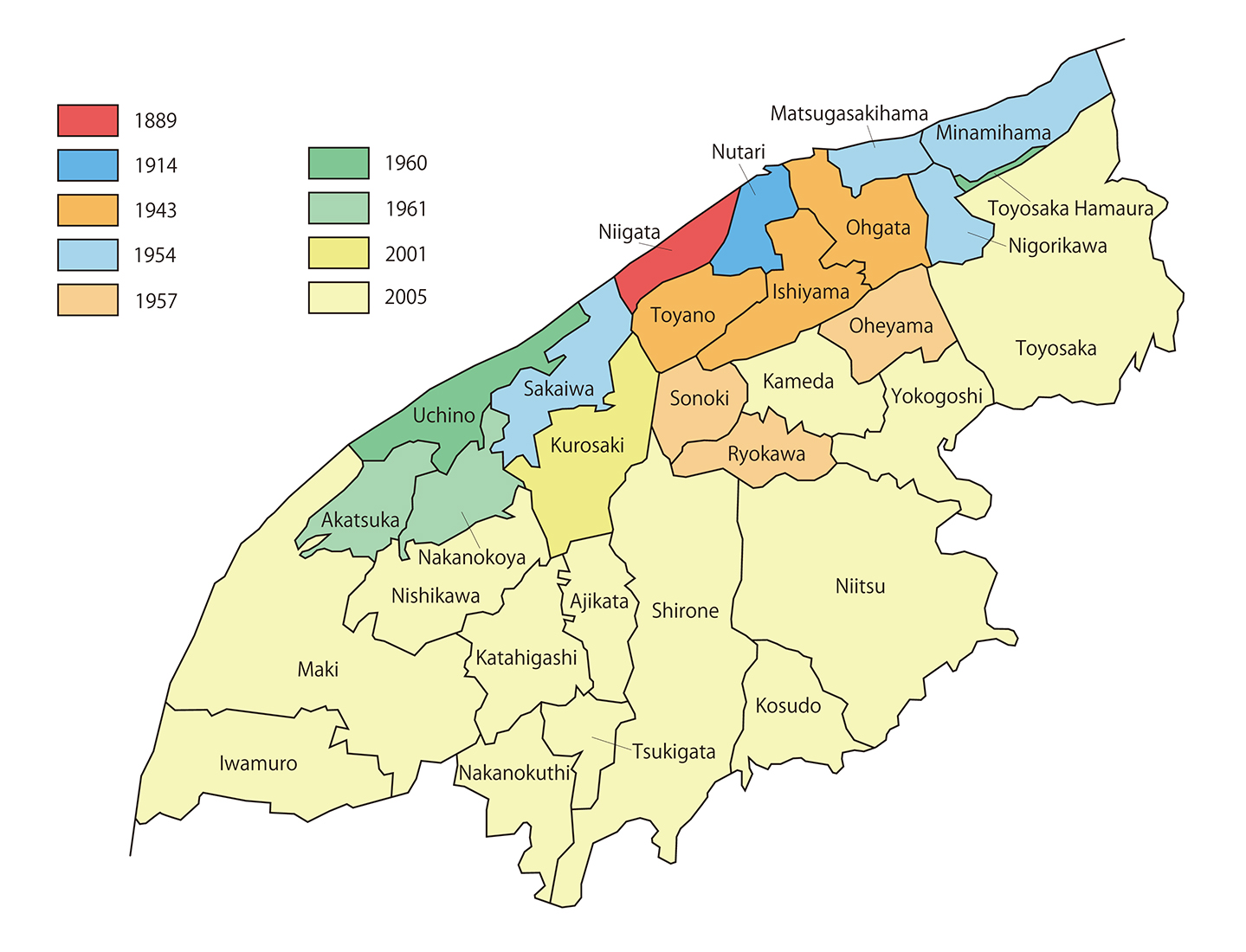
Mergers of Niigata

Toyosaka (豊栄市, Toyosaka-shi) was a city located in Niigata Prefecture, Japan. On March 21, 2005, Toyosaka, along with the towns of Kameda, Kosudo and Yokogoshi (all from Nakakanbara District), the town of Nishikawa, and the villages of Ajikata, Iwamuro, Katahigashi, Nakanokuchi and Tsukigata (all from Nishikanbara District), was merged into the expanded city of Niigata. As of April 1, 2007, the area is part of Kita-ku ward.

The city was founded on November 1, 1970. By 2003, the city had an estimated population of 49,159 and the density of 639.67 persons per km^{2}. The total area was 76.85 km^{2}.

== See also ==
- Kita-ku, Niigata
- Niigata, Niigata
- Toyosaka Station
