= Tsukigata, Niigata =

Tsukigata 月潟村
- Former municipality
- Flag Seal

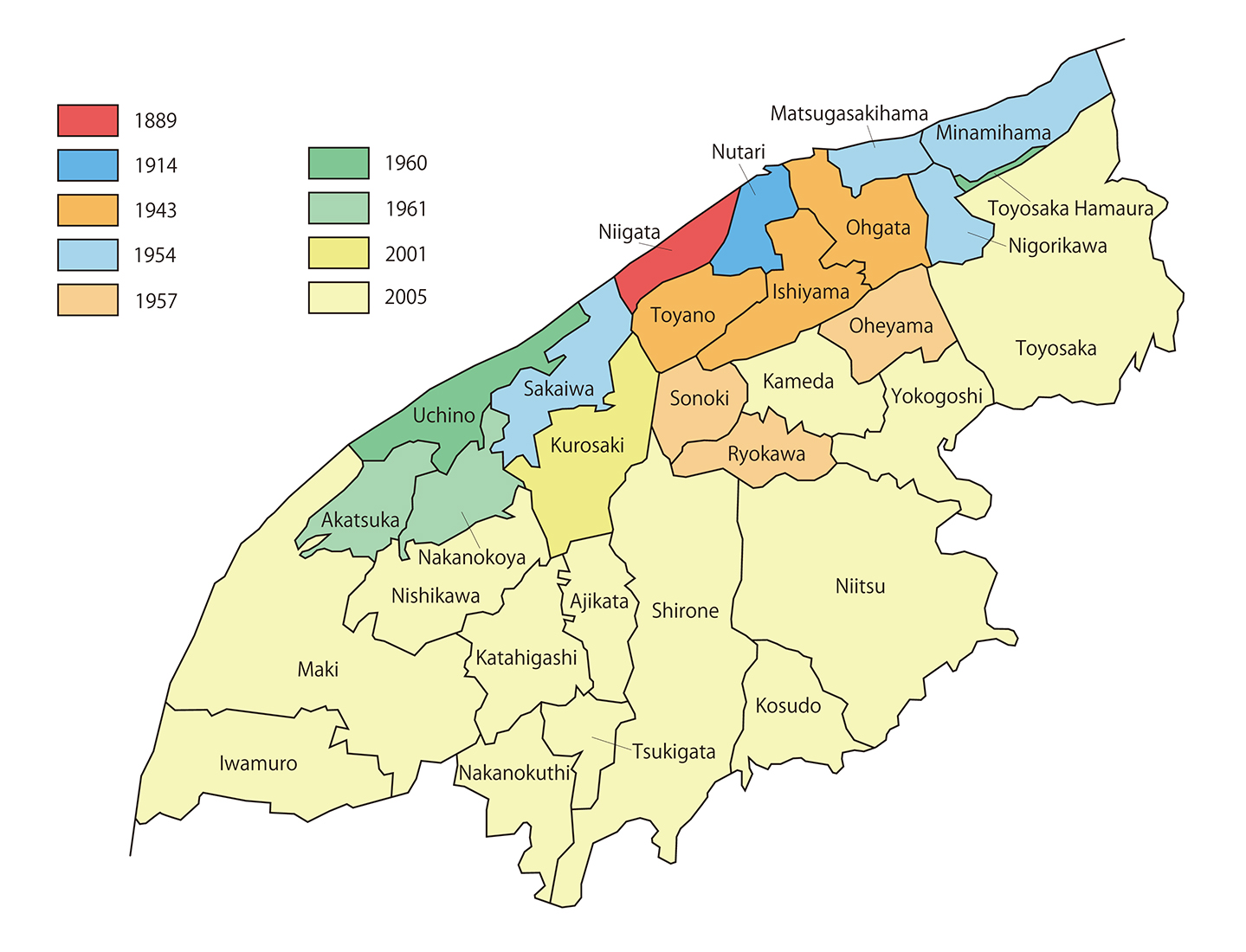
- Location of Tsukigata in Niigata Prefecture
- Country: Japan
- Region: Hokuriku
- Prefecture: Niigata Prefecture
- District: Nishikanbara District
- Merged: March 21, 2005 (now part of Niigata)

Area
  - Total: 9.04 km^{2} (3.49 sq mi)

Population (2005)
  - Total: 3,767
- Time zone: UTC+09:00 (JST)
- Symbols
- Flower: Laurus nobilis

Tsukigata (月潟村, Tsukigata-mura) was a village located in Nishikanbara District, Niigata Prefecture, Japan.

As of 2003, the village had an estimated population of 3,769 and a density of 416.92 persons per km^{2}. The total area was 9.04 km^{2}.

On March 21, 2005, Tsukigata, along with the cities of Niitsu, Shirone and Toyosaka, the towns of Kameda, Kosudo and Yokogoshi (all from Nakakanbara District), the town of Nishikawa, and the villages of Ajikata, Iwamuro, Katahigashi and Nakanokuchi (all from Nishikanbara District), was merged into the expanded city of Niigata. As of April 1, 2007, the area is part of Minami-ku ward.
