= Nakakanbara District, Niigata =

Former district in Niigata prefecture, Japan

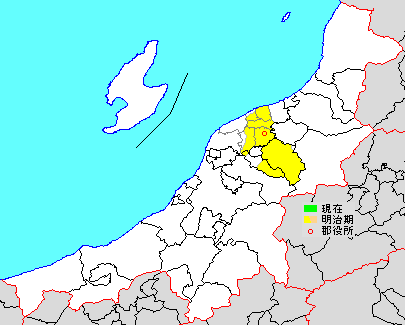
Map showing original extent of Nakakanbara District in Niigata Prefecture: * yellow - areas formerly within the district borders during the early Meiji period

Nakakanbara (中蒲原郡, Nakakanbara-gun) was a district located in Niigata Prefecture, Japan.

As of 2003, the district had an estimated population of 20,066 with a density of 79.29 persons per km^{2}. The total area was 253.07 km^{2}.

== Municipalities ==
Prior to its dissolution, the district consisted of only one town:

- Muramatsu (Note: Classified as a town.)

== History ==
In 1878, Nakakanbara District was established.

The district started to shrink after the town of Nuttari merged with Niigata and the city continued to absorb the district. Three towns later gained city status during a 10-year period: Niitsu in 1951, Gosen in 1954 and Shirone (part of Niigata) in 1959.

=== District Timeline ===
- On June 1, 1959 - The town of Shirone was elevated to city status to become the city of Shirone. (3 towns, 1 village)
- On November 1, 1996 - The village of Yokogoshi was elevated to town status to become the town of Yokogoshi. (4 towns)

=== Recent mergers ===
- On March 21, 2005 - The towns of Kameda, Kosudo and Yokogoshi, along with the cities of Niitsu, Shirone and Toyosaka, the town of Nishikawa, and the villages of Ajikata, Iwamuro, Katahigashi, Nakanokuchi and Tsukigata (all from Nishikanbara District), were merged into the expanded city of Niigata.
- On January 1, 2006 - The town of Muramatsu was merged into the expanded city of Gosen. Nakakanbara District was dissolved as a result of this merger.

== See also ==
- List of dissolved districts of Japan
