= Nishikanbara District, Niigata =

District of Niigata, Japan

Coordinates: 37.6939°N 138.836°E

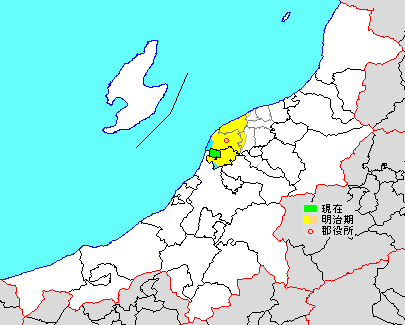
Map showing original extent of Nishikanbara District in Niigata Prefecture: * yellow - areas formerly within the district borders during the early Meiji period * green - current borders: 1. Yahiko-mura

Nishikanbara (西蒲原郡, Nishikanbara-gun) is a district located in Niigata Prefecture, Japan.

As of July 1, 2019, the district has an estimated population of 7,824 with a density of 311 persons per km^{2}. The total area is 25.17 km^{2}.

== Municipalities ==
The district consists of only one village:

- Yahiko (Note: Classified as a village.)

== History ==
=== District Timeline ===
- After the town of Sekiya merged with the city of Niigata, back in 1889 in order to gain city status, the district continues to reduce in size by merging with surrounding areas.
- On March 31, 1954 - The town of Tsubame merged with three villages to gain city status.

=== Recent mergers ===
- On January 1, 2001 - The town of Kurosaki was absorbed into the expanded city of Niigata.
- On March 21, 2005 - The town of Nishikawa and the villages of Ajikata, Iwamuro, Katahigashi, Nakanokuchi and Tsukigata were absorbed into the expanded city of Niigata.
- On October 10, 2005 - The town of Maki (former seat of this district) was absorbed into the expanded city of Niigata.
- On March 20, 2006 - The towns of Bunsui and Yoshida were merged into the expanded city of Tsubame.
