= List of cities in Niigata Prefecture by population =

The following list sorts all cities (including towns and villages) in the Japanese prefecture of Niigata with a population of more than 10,000 according to the 2020 Census. As of October 1, 2020, 22 places fulfill this criterion and are listed here. This list refers only to the population of individual cities, towns and villages within their defined limits, which does not include other municipalities or suburban areas within urban agglomerations.

== List ==
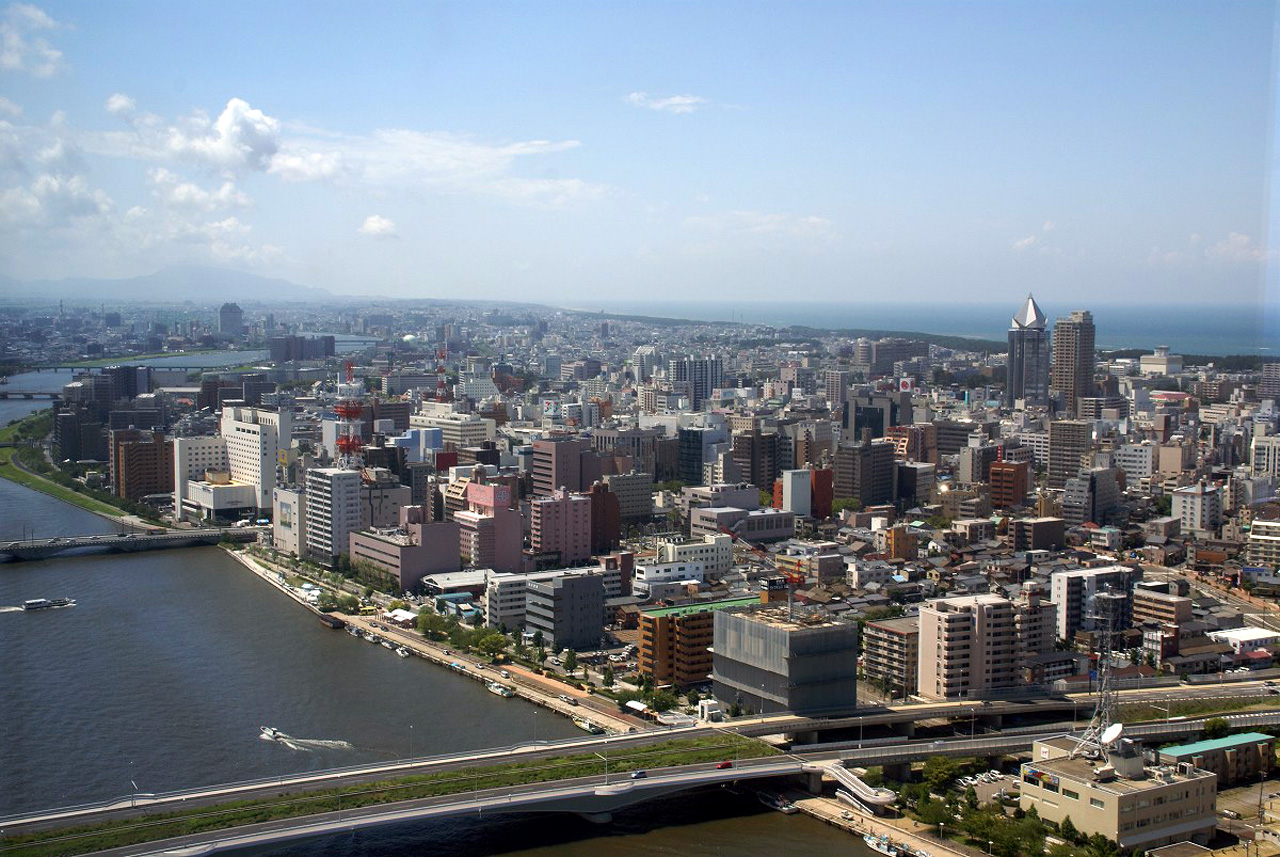
01.Niigata

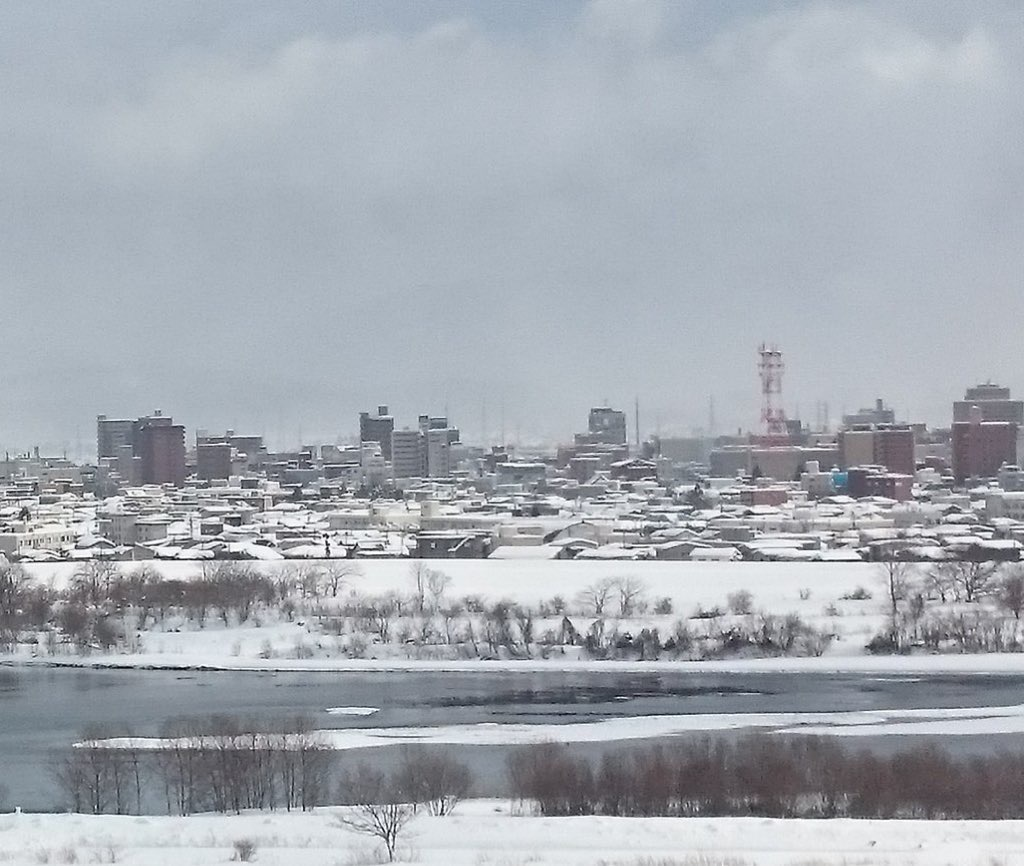
02.Nagaoka

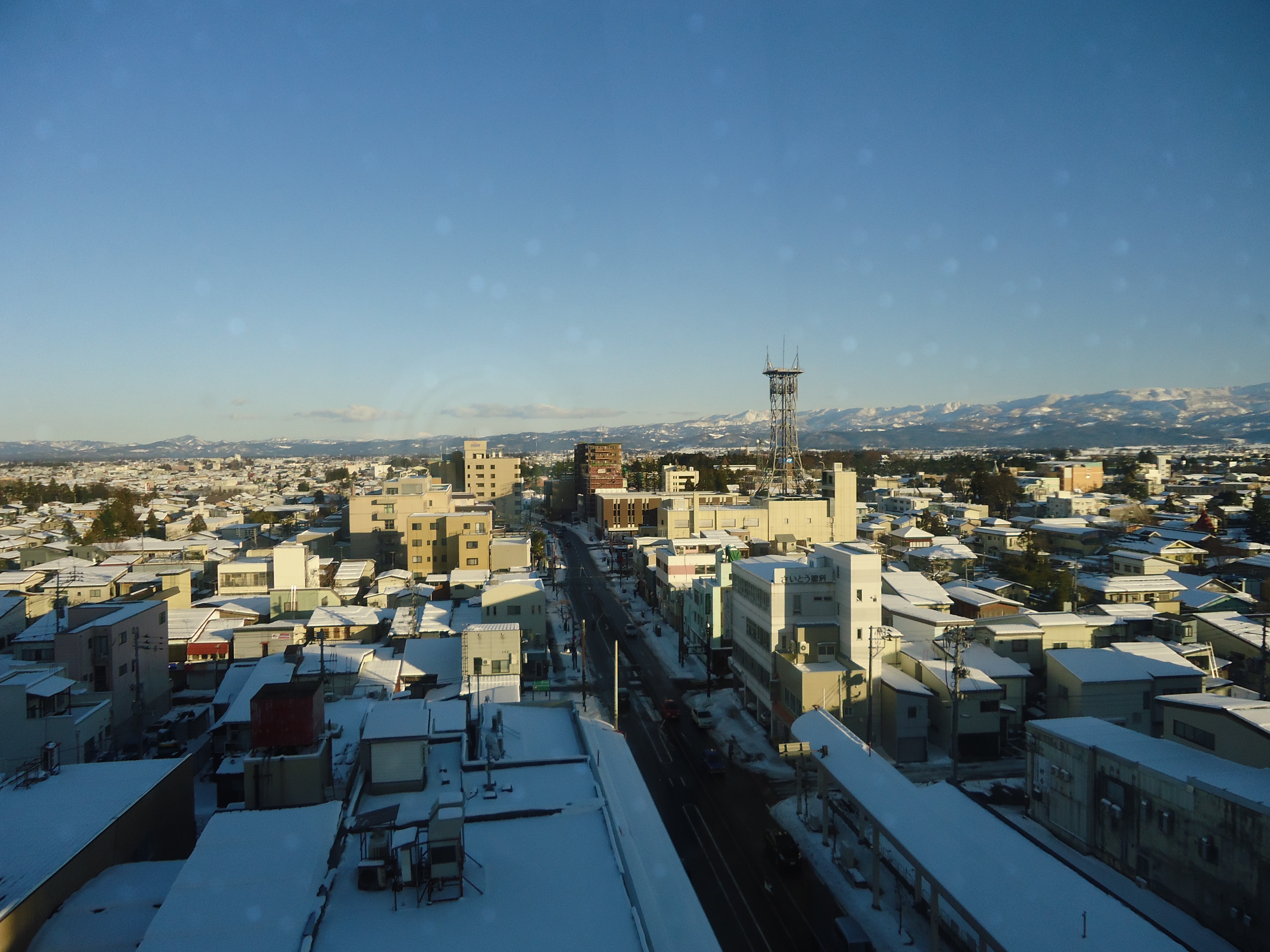
03.Jōetsu

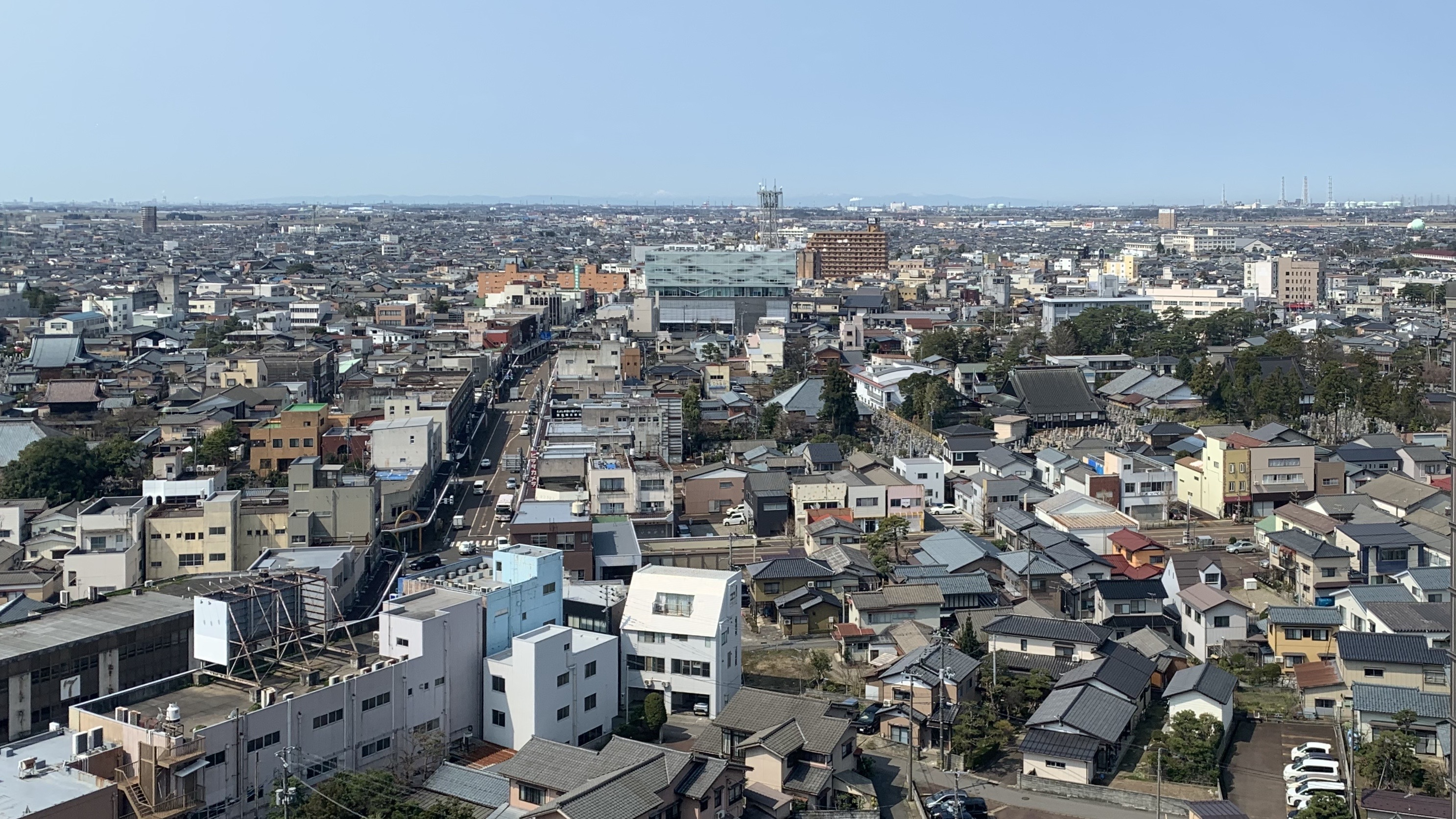
04.Shibata

The following table lists the 22 cities, villages and towns in Niigata with a population of at least 10,000 on October 1, 2020, according to the 2020 Census. The table also gives an overview of the evolution of the population since the 1995 census.

Rank (2020)	Name	Status	2020	2015	2010	2005	2000	1995
1	Niigata	City	789,715	810,157	811,901	813,847	808,969	796,456
2	Nagaoka	City	267,115	275,133	282,674	288,457	292,887	293,250
3	Jōetsu	City	188,119	196,987	203,899	208,082	211,870	212,060
4	Shibata	City	94,976	86,833	101,202	104,634	106,016	106,563
5	Sanjō	City	94,679	99,192	102,292	104,749	107,662	109,584
6	Kashiwazaki	City	81,549	86,833	91,451	94,648	97,896	101,427
7	Tsubame	City	77,234	79,784	81,876	83,269	84,297	84,051
8	Murakami	City	57,444	62,442	66,427	70,705	73,902	75,591
9	Minamiuonuma	City	54,876	58,568	61,624	63,329	65,492	66,118
10	Sado	City	51,513	57,255	62,727	67,386	72,173	74,949
11	Tōkamachi	City	49,834	54,917	58,911	62,058	65,033	67,962
12	Gosen	City	47,650	51,404	54,550	56,962	58,820	60,354
13	Itoigawa	City	40,778	44,162	47,702	49,844	53,021	54,780
14	Agano	City	40,708	43,415	45,560	47,043	48,456	48,828
15	Mitsuke	City	39,252	40,608	41,862	42,668	43,760	43,760
16	Uonuma	City	34,501	37,352	40,361	43,555	45,386	46,490
17	Ojiya	City	34,102	36,498	38,600	39,956	41,641	42,494
18	Myōkō	City	30,402	33,199	35,457	37,831	39,699	40,744
19	Tainai	City	28,527	30,198	31,424	32,813	34,278	34,830
20	Kamo	City	25,449	27,852	29,762	31,482	33,085	33,800
21	Seirō	Town	14,266	14,040	13,724	13,497	13,313	12,840
22	Tagami	Town	11,231	12,188	12,791	13,363	13,643	13,523
