= Kamo, Niigata =

City in Niigata Prefecture, Japan

Kamo 加茂市
- City
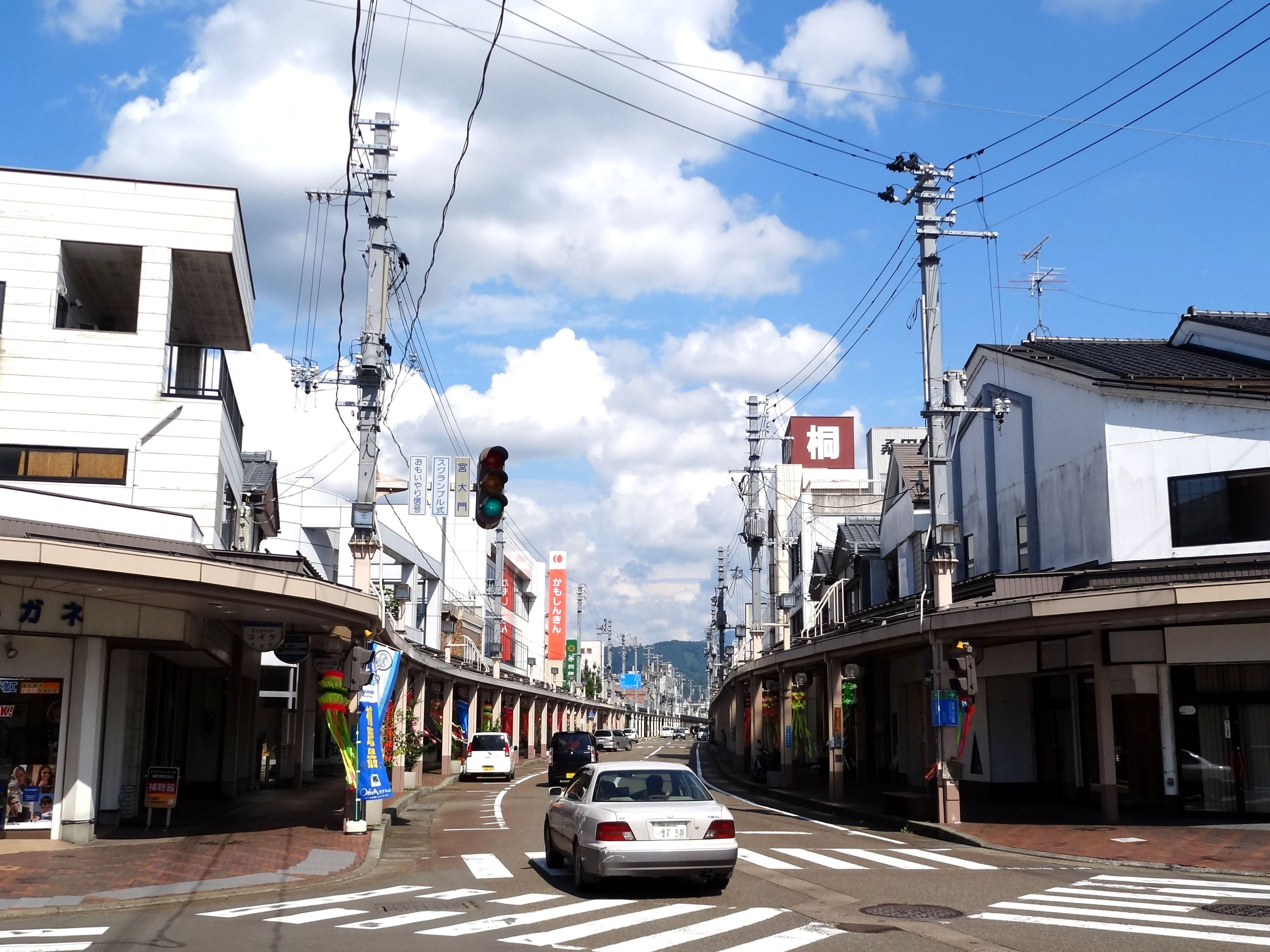
- Downtown Kamo City

- Flag Seal

- Location of Kamo in Niigata Prefecture

- Coordinates: 37°39′58.7″N 139°2′24.8″E
- Country: Japan
- Region: Chūbu (Kōshin'etsu) (Hokuriku)
- Prefecture: Niigata

Government
  - Mayor: Akemi Fujita

Area
  - Total: 133.72 km^{2} (51.63 sq mi)

Population (July 1, 2019)
  - Total: 25,971
  - Density: 194.22/km^{2} (503.03/sq mi)
- Time zone: UTC+9 (Japan Standard Time)
- Symbols
  - Tree: Cryptomeria
  - Flower: Camellia japonica
- Phone number: 0256-52-0080
- Address: 2-3-5, Saiwai-cho, Kamo-shi, Niigata-ken 959-1392
- Website: Official website

Kamo (加茂市, Kamo-shi) is a city located in Niigata Prefecture, Japan. As of 1 July 2019, the city had an estimated population of 25,971 in 10,270 households, and a population density of 194 persons per km^{2}. The total area of the city was 133.72 square kilometres (51.63 sq mi).

== Geography ==
Kamo is located in an inland region of north-central Niigata Prefecture. As the city name implies, the Kamo River flows through the city. The highest elevation is the summit of Mount Awagatake at 1292 meters. The city is located roughly halfway between the two larger cities of Nagaoka and Niigata.

=== Surrounding municipalities ===
- Niigata Prefecture
  - Gosen
  - Minami-ku, Niigata
  - Sanjō
  - Tagami

== Climate ==
Kamo has a humid subtropical climate (Köppen Cfa) characterized by warm, wet summers and cold winters with heavy snowfall. The average annual temperature in Kamo is 12.6 °C. The average annual rainfall is 1978 mm with September as the wettest month. The temperatures are highest on average in August, at around 25.9 °C, and lowest in January, at around 0.6 °C.

== Demographics ==
Per Japanese census data, the population of Kamo has declined steadily over the past 50 years.

Historical population
| Year | Pop. | ±% |
|---|---|---|
| 1970 | 37,890 | — |
| 1980 | 36,706 | −3.1% |
| 1990 | 34,863 | −5.0% |
| 2000 | 33,085 | −5.1% |
| 2010 | 29,762 | −10.0% |
| 2020 | 25,441 | −14.5% |

== History ==
The area of present-day Kamo was part of ancient Echigo Province, and developed from the early Heian period as settlement associated with a branch of the Kamo Shrine in Kyoto from 794 AD. The town of Kamo was established within Kitakanbara District, Niigata with the establishment of the modern municipalities system on April 1, 1889. It was elevated to city status on March 10, 1954.

== Government ==
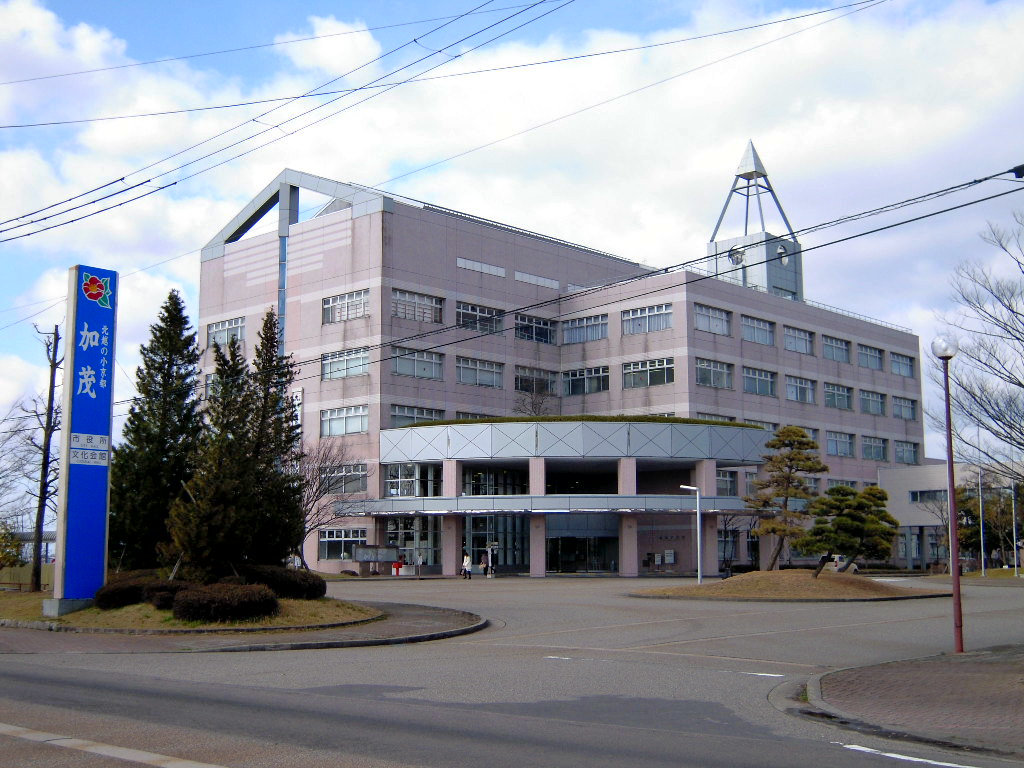
Kamo City Hall

Kano has a mayor-council form of government with a directly elected mayor and a unicameral city legislature of 18 members.

== Economy ==
Kamo is traditionally associated with its production of kiri-tansu, a type of tansu chest-of-drawers made from paulownia wood. The city is also a centre for the manufacturing of electrical appliances and furniture.

== Education ==
=== Colleges and universities ===
- Niigata Chuoh Junior College
- Niigata University of Management

=== Primary and secondary education ===
Kamo has six public elementary schools and five public middle schools operated by the city government. The city has three public high schools operated by the Niigata Prefectural Board of Education.

== Transportation ==
=== Railway ===
JR East - Shin'etsu Main Line

- Kamo

=== Highway ===
- National Route 290
- National Route 403

== Sister cities ==
Kamo maintains sister city ties with three cities:

- Komsomolsk-on-Amur, Russia
- Ōshima, Japan, since 1968
- Zibo, China, friendship city since October 21, 1993

== Local attractions ==
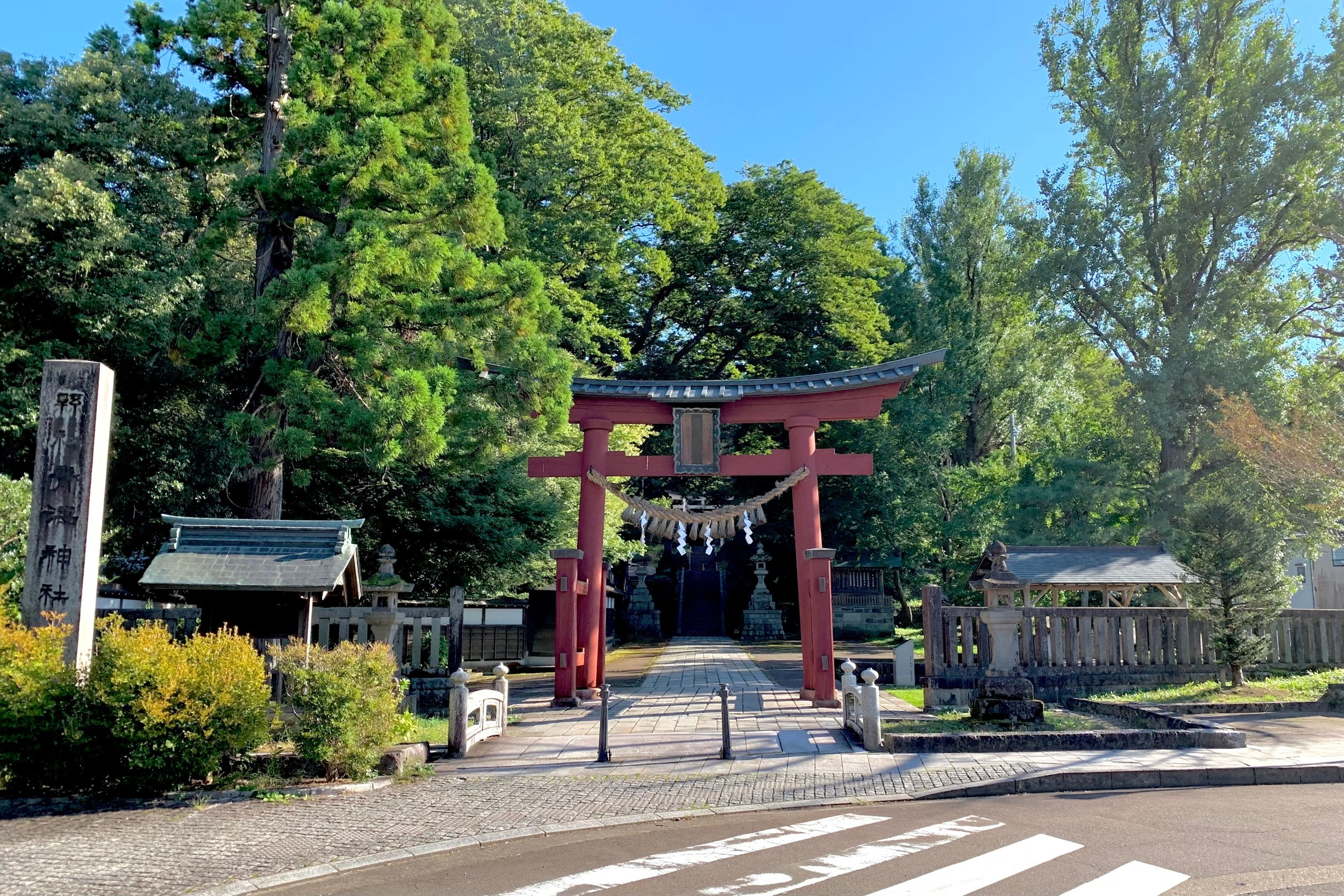
Kamoyama Park and Aomi Shrine

Kamo is a popular place for small tour groups, especially for children in elementary school. It is advertised as a "traditional town" and sometimes referred to as the Little Kyoto of the Hokuetsu region. This is because it shares certain structural features with Kyoto, being surrounded on three sides by mountains and intersected by a river. Kamo's most famous attraction is Kamoyama Park, which is home to the Aomi Jinja (Shrine) and many other sights, including a petting area for small squirrels which the town has regularly imported. The Kamo River is also the site of many city events, including the Obon Festival in August and the Snow Camelia Festival in April. The snow camelia is a symbol of Kamo and can be seen growing in many locations around the city.

== Notable people from Kamo ==
- Shigeo Gochō (Photographer)
- Kanako Higuchi (actress)
- Hirohiko Izumida (governor of Niigata Prefecture)
- Nobuo Kawaguchi (football player)
- Makiko Kikuta (politician)
