= Muramatsu, Niigata =

Muramatsu 村松町
- Former municipality
- Flag Emblem
- Interactive map of Muramatsu
- Country: Japan
- Region: Hokuriku
- Prefecture: Niigata Prefecture
- District: Nakakanbara District
- Merged: January 1, 2006 (now part of Gosen)

Area
  - Total: 253.07 km^{2} (97.71 sq mi)

Population (2005)
  - Total: 19,817
- Time zone: UTC+09:00 (JST)

Muramatsu (村松町, Muramatsu-machi) was a town located in Nakakanbara District, Niigata Prefecture, Japan. On January 1, 2006, Muramatsu was merged into the expanded city of Gosen. Current mail addresses read "Gosen City, Muramatsu" (五泉市村松) to mark the merger.

The town existed for several centuries as a feudal domain and independent town. It was famous for its mountain (Mt. Hakusan, approximately 1000 meters tall), the Jikoji Zen Temple, the Sakurando Onsen Hot Spring, and its city park boasting several thousand cherry trees that bloom each year in April.

As of 2003, the town had an estimated population of 20,066 and a density of 79.29 persons per km^{2}. The total area was 253.07 km^{2}.

== History ==
The three-volume History of Muramatsu Town (村松町史) published in 1983 gives many details about its long history. One of only a few castle-towns in Niigata Prefecture, the Muramatsu Clan was ruled by the Hori Family throughout the Edo period. The feudal castle was burned down during the Boshin War in 1868. The site is now a public park housing a small museum archive as well as the town's elaborate festival wagon, which is brought out each September during the Autumn Equinox.

In September 1945, 1800 members of the 1st and 2nd battalion, 27th regiment of US Army soldiers were housed at the Signal Corps barracks on the eastern edge of town. They stayed until that December, leaving a very positive impression on the Japanese citizens and contradicting rumors and suspicions spread by wartime propaganda. An English-language memoir of this period was published electronically in 2000 by the University of Kansas Center for East Asian Studies (Goto, 2000).

In May, 1946, a very large fire burned for more than eight hours, destroying 70% of the town (over 1000 homes), injuring fifty-nine and killing two. Much of the downtown district was destroyed and historical buildings lost (History v. II, pp. 802–806).

== Education ==
Muramatsu had five elementary schools (Muramatsu, Muramatsu Higashi, Kawachi, Juuzen, and Okambara), two middle schools (Atago and Sanno), and a prefectural high school.

== Transportation ==
=== Railway ===
In October 1923, the Kanbara Tetsudou (ja:蒲原鉄道) established a railway in Muramatsu, including a new station and service north to Gosen City. The line then expanded south to Kamo City. The railway company was dissolved in 1999 and all train service in town suspended. The original wooden railway station was purchased and moved off-site to Yasuda City, where it was rebuilt as a small museum.

=== Highway ===
- Japan National Route 290
