= Maoroshi Station =

Railway station in Gosen, Niigata Prefecture, Japan

Maoroshi Station 馬下駅
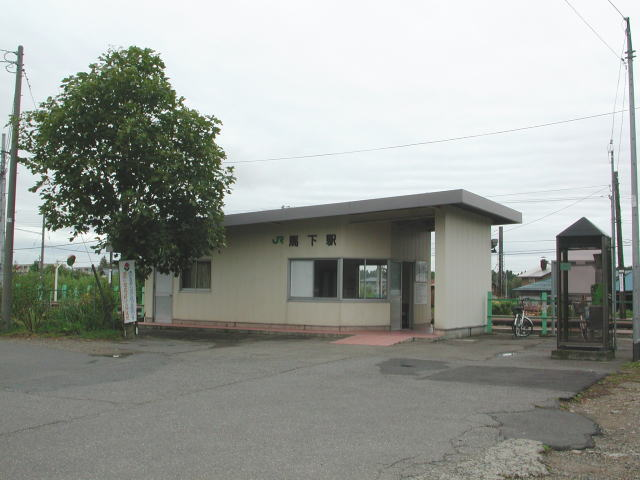
- Maoroshi Station, September 2004

General information
- Location: Maoroshi, Gosen-shi, Niigata-ken 959-1614; Japan
- Coordinates: 37°44′15″N 139°15′38″E
- Operator: JR East
- Line: ■ Ban'etsu West Line
- Distance: 158.4 km from Kōriyama
- Platforms: 1 side platform+ 1 island platform
- Tracks: 3

Other information
- Status: Unstaffed
- Website: Official website

History
- Opened: 25 October 1910

Services
Preceding station	JR East	Following station
Gosen towards Niitsu	Ban'etsu West Line Rapid Agano	Sakihana towards Aizu-Wakamatsu
Saruwada towards Niitsu	Ban'etsu West Line Local	Sakihana towards Kōriyama
Location
- Location within Japan

Maoroshi Station (馬下駅, Maoroshi eki) is a railway station in the city of Gosen, Niigata Prefecture, Japan, operated by East Japan Railway Company (JR East).

== Lines ==
Maoroshi Station is served by the Ban'etsu West Line, and is 158.4 kilometers from the terminus of the line at Kōriyama.

== Station layout ==
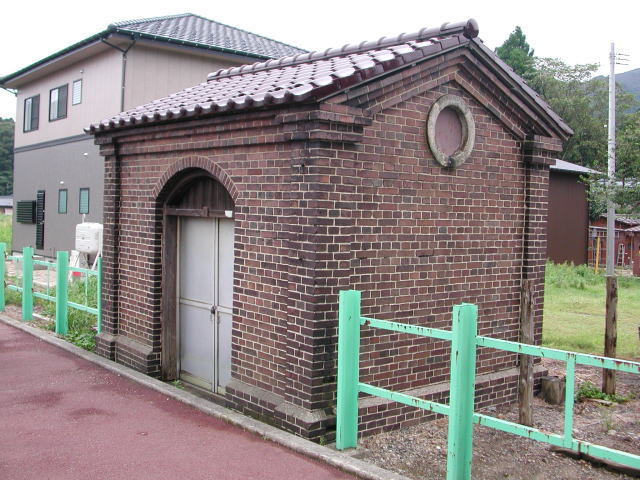
Lamp house

The station consists of one ground-level side platform and one island platform serving three tracks, connected by a footbridge. The station is unattended.

=== Platforms ===
1	■ Ban'etsu West Line	for Gosen and Niitsu
2	■ Ban'etsu West Line	Nozawa, Kitakata, Aizu-Wakamatsu
3	■ Ban'etsu West Line	starting trains

== History ==
The station opened on 25 October 1910. With the privatization of Japanese National Railways (JNR) on 1 April 1987, the station came under the control of JR East.

== Surrounding area ==
- Maoroshi Post office
- Agano River
- National Route 290
