= Saruwada Station =

Railway station in Gosen, Niigata Prefecture, Japan

Sarawada Station 猿和田駅
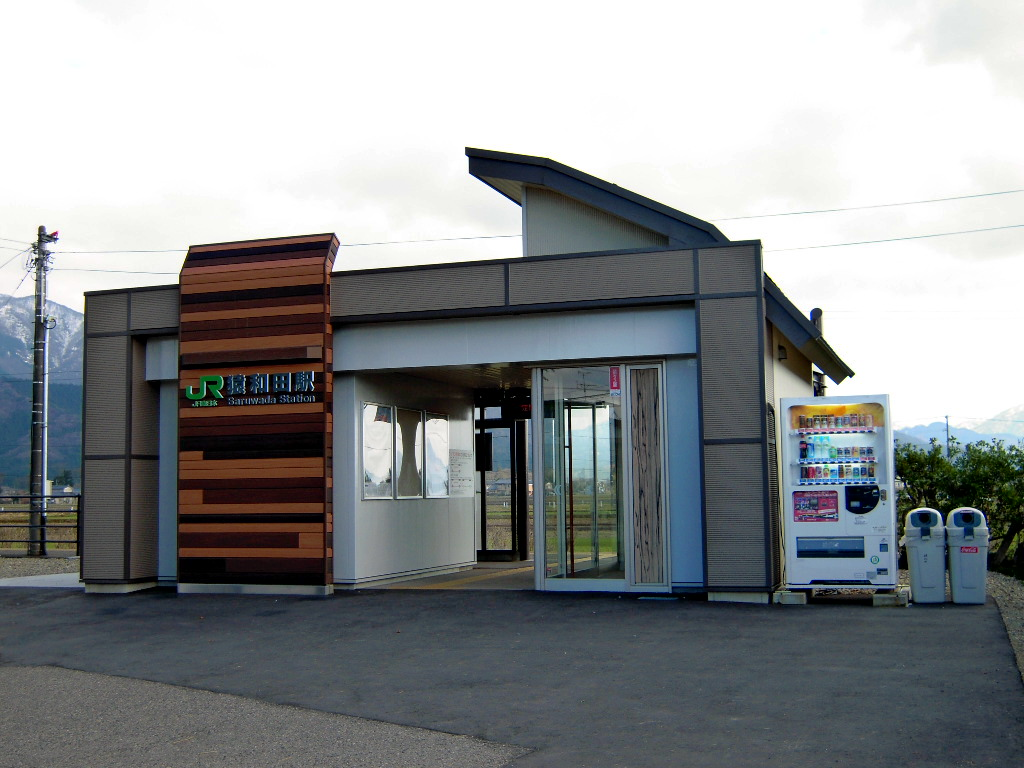
- Saruwada Station, April 2010

General information
- Location: Tsuchibori, Gosen-shi, Niigata-ken 959-1643; Japan
- Coordinates: 37.7295°N 139.2224°E
- Operator: JR East
- Line: ■ Ban'etsu West Line
- Distance: 161.9 km from Kōriyama
- Platforms: 1 side platform
- Tracks: 1

Other information
- Status: Unstaffed
- Website: Official website

History
- Opened: 15 August 1955

Services
Preceding station	JR East	Following station
Gosen towards Niitsu	Ban'etsu West Line Local	Maoroshi towards Kōriyama
Location
- Location within Japan

Saruwada Station (猿和田駅, Saruwada-eki) is a railway station in the city of Gosen, Niigata Prefecture, Japan, operated by the East Japan Railway Company (JR East).

== Lines ==
Saruwada Station is served by the Ban'etsu West Line, and is 161.9 kilometers from the terminus of the line at Kōriyama.

== Station layout ==
The station consists of one ground-level side platform serving a single bi-directional track. The station is unattended.

== History ==
The station opened on 15 August 1955. With the privatization of Japanese National Railways (JNR) on 1 April 1987, the station came under the control of JR East. A new station building was completed in 2009.

== Surrounding area ==
- Saruwada Post Office
- Gosen Kawahigashi Elementary School
- Gosen Kawahigashi Middle School
- National Route 290
