= Tagami, Niigata =

Town in Niigata Prefecture, Japan

Tagami 田上町
- Town
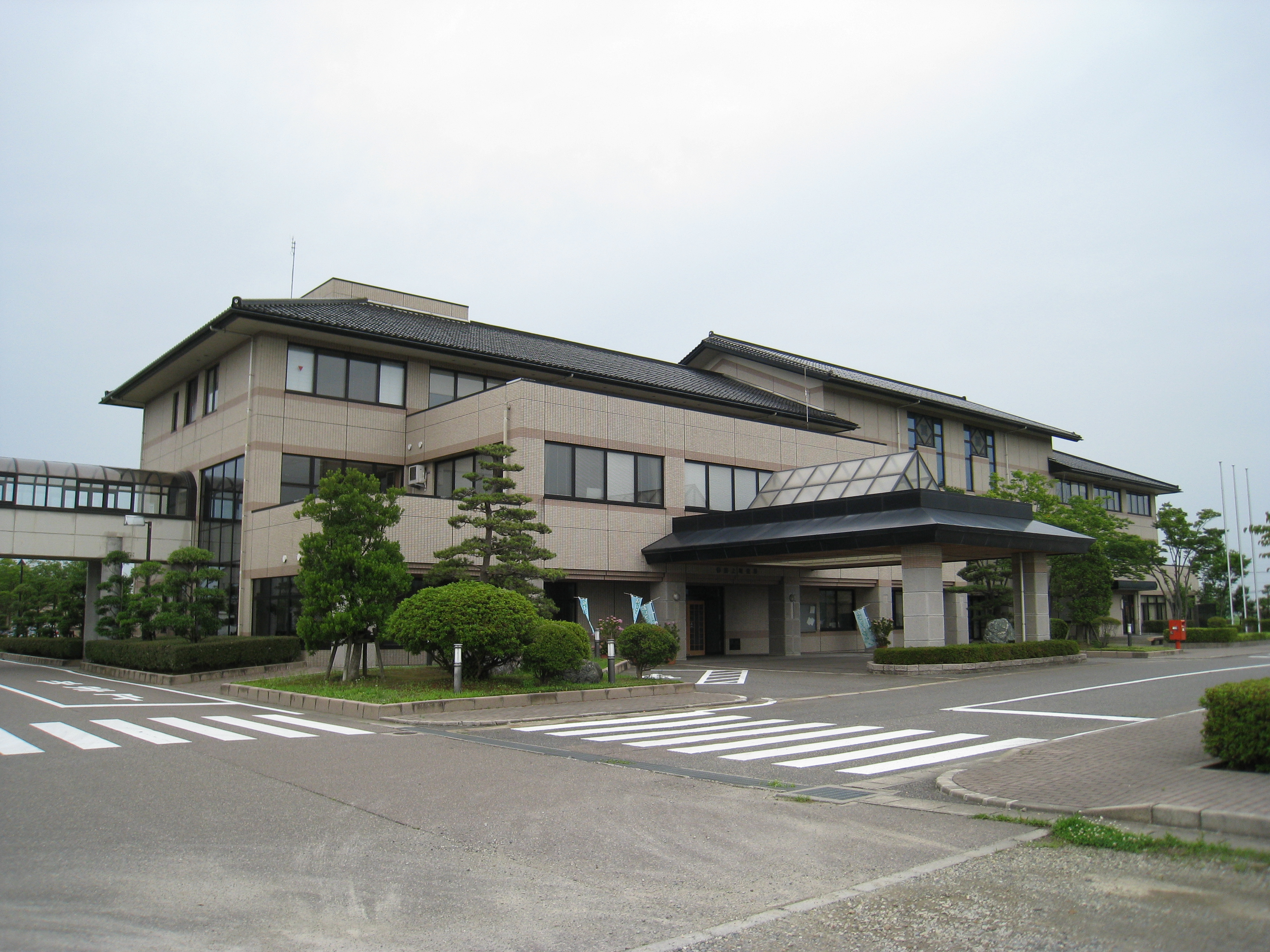
- Tagami town hall

- Flag Seal

- Location of Tagami in Niigata

- Coordinates: 37°41′55.6″N 139°3′28.7″E
- Country: Japan
- Region: Chūbu (Kōshin'etsu) (Hokuriku)
- Prefecture: Niigata
- District: Minamikanbara

Area
  - Total: 31.71 km^{2} (12.24 sq mi)

Population (July 1, 2019)
  - Total: 11,481
  - Density: 362.1/km^{2} (937.7/sq mi)
- Time zone: UTC+9 (Japan Standard Time)
- Symbols
  - Tree: Sakura
  - Flower: Hydrangea macrophylla
- Phone number: 0256-57-6222
- Address: 3070 Haragasaki Shinden, Tagami-machi, Minamikambara-gun, Niigata-ken 959-1503
- Website: Official website

Tagami (田上町, Tagami-machi) is a town located in Niigata Prefecture, Japan. As of 1 July 2019, the town had an estimated population of 11,481 across 4,203 households and a population density of 362 persons per km^{2}. The total area of the town was 31.71 square kilometres (12.24 sq mi).

== Geography ==
Tagami is located in central Niigata Prefecture, bordered by the city of Niigata to the north. The Shinano River flows through the town.

=== Surrounding municipalities ===
- Niigata Prefecture
  - Akiha-ku, Niigata
  - Gosen
  - Kamo
  - Minami-ku, Niigata

== Climate ==
Tagami has a humid subtropical climate (Köppen Cfa) characterized by warm, wet summers and cold winters with heavy snowfall. The average annual temperature in Tagami is 13.0 °C. The average annual rainfall is 1958 mm with September as the wettest month. The temperatures are highest on average in August, at around 26.3 °C, and lowest in January, at around 1.2 °C.

== Demographics ==
Per Japanese census data, the population of Tagami peaked at around the year 2000 and has declined steadily since.

Historical population
Year	Pop.	±%
1970	9,534	—
1980	11,396	+19.5%
1990	12,761	+12.0%
2000	13,643	+6.9%
2010	12,791	−6.2%
2020	11,227	−12.2%

== History ==
The area of present-day Tagami was part of ancient Echigo Province and was part of the tenryō territories administered directly by the Tokugawa shogunate during the Edo period.. The village of Tagami was established within Minamikanbara District, Niigata on April 1, 1889 with the creation of the modern municipalities system. It was raised to town status on August 1, 1973.

== Economy ==
The local economy is dominated by agriculture, notably rice production. However, the town is increasingly becoming a bedroom community for neighbouring Niigata city, Sanjo and Kamo.

== Education ==
Tagami has two public elementary schools and one public middle school operated by the town government. There is no high school within town limits; however, the Niigata Chuoh Junior College is located in Tagami.

== Transportation ==
=== Railway ===
JR East - Shin'etsu Main Line

- Tagami

=== Highway ===
- National Route 403
