= Gosen Station =

Railway station in Gosen, Niigata Prefecture, Japan

Gosen Station 五泉駅
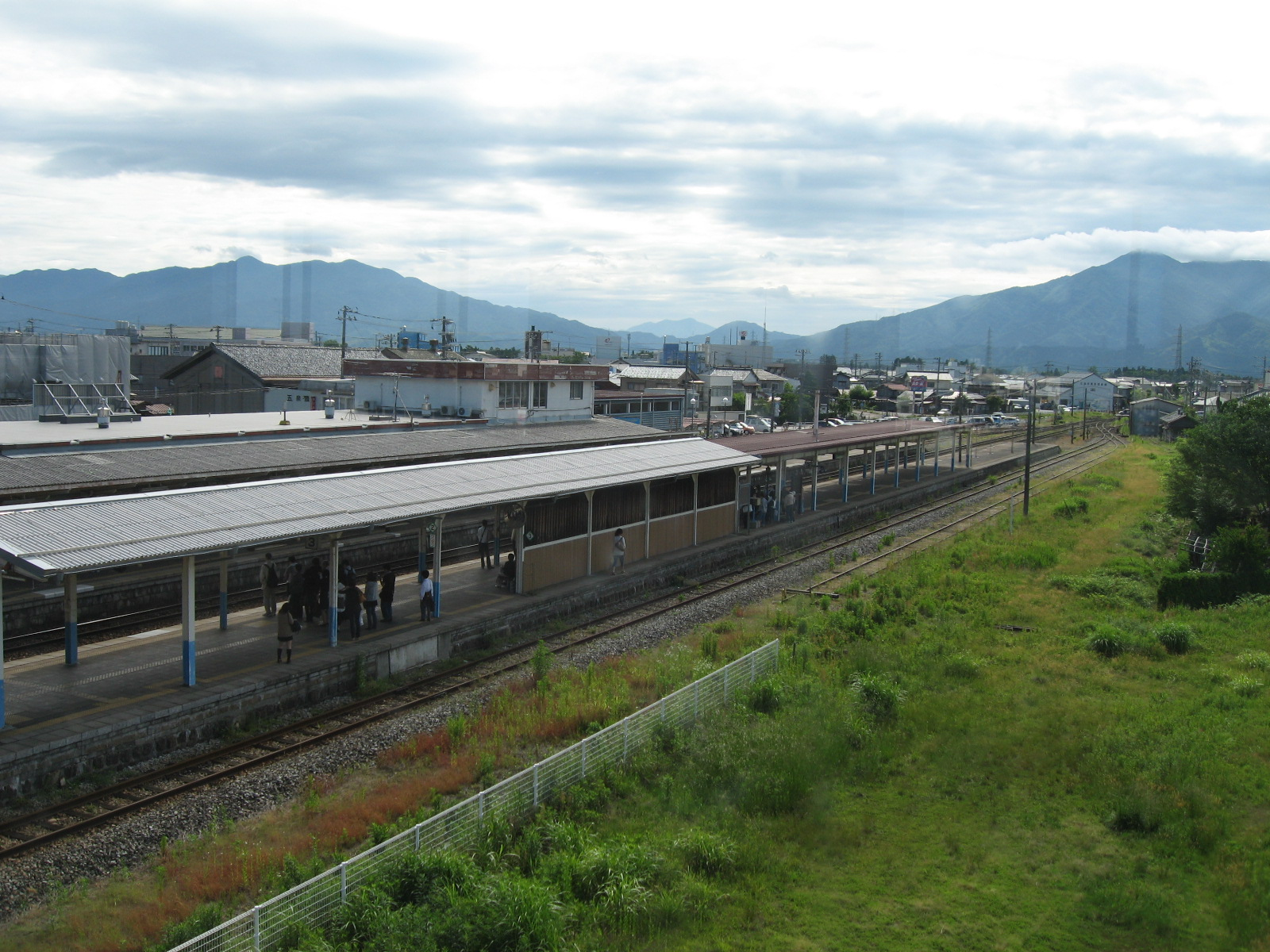
- Gosen Station in June 2008

General information
- Location: 1-1-1 Ekimae, Gosen-shi, Niigata-ken 959-1823; Japan
- Coordinates: 37.7346°N 139.1798°E
- Operator: JR East
- Line: ■ Ban'etsu West Line
- Distance: 165.7 km from Kōriyama
- Platforms: 1 side + 1 island platform
- Tracks: 3

Other information
- Status: Staffed (Midori no Madoguchi)
- Website: Official website

History
- Opened: 25 October 1910

Passengers
- FY2017: 1,093 daily>

Services
Preceding station	JR East	Following station
Niitsu Terminus	Ban'etsu West Line Rapid Agano	Maoroshi towards Aizu-Wakamatsu
Kita-Gosen towards Niitsu	Ban'etsu West Line Local	Saruwada towards Kōriyama
Location
- Location within Japan

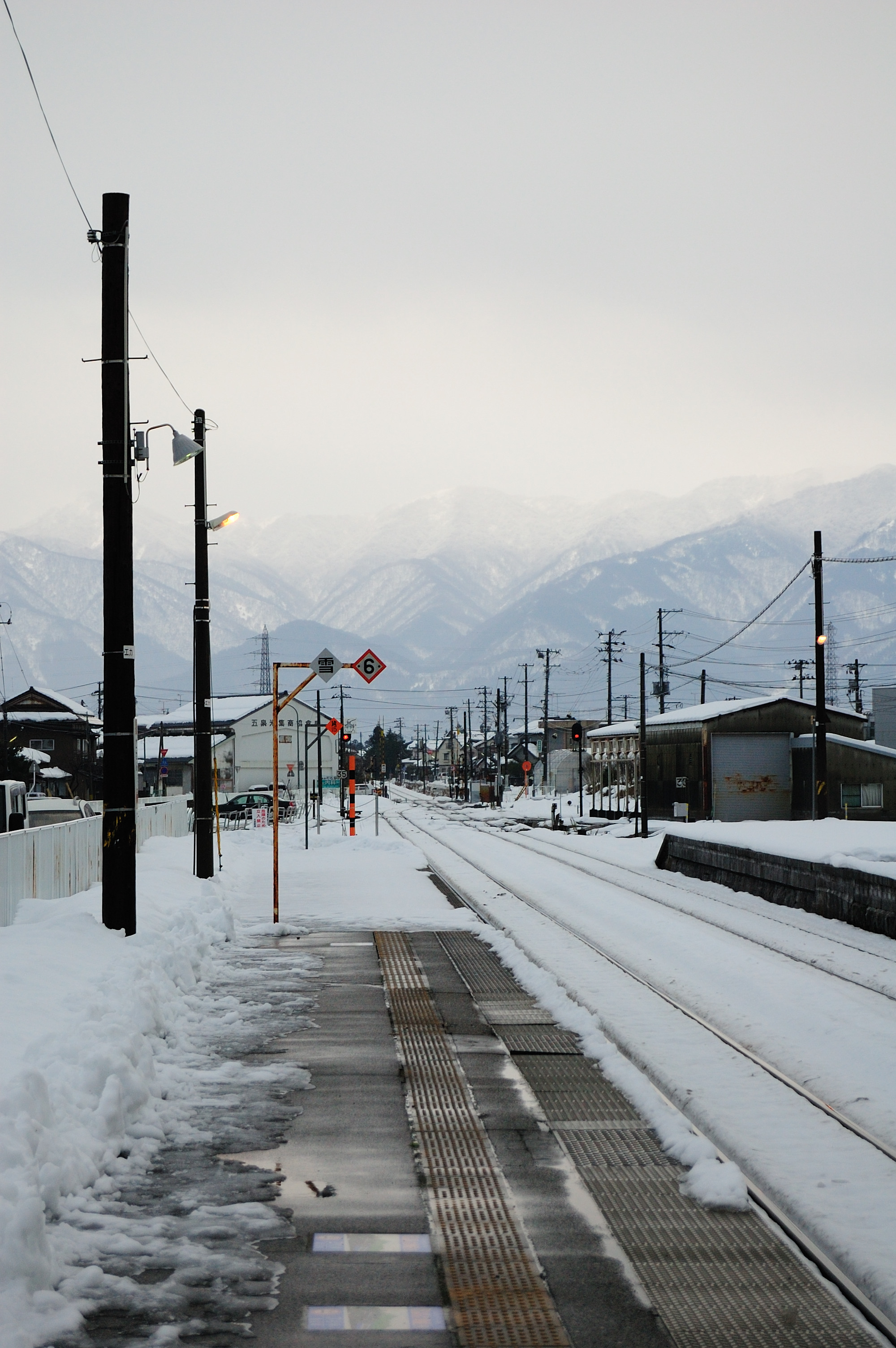
Gosen Station in winter

Gosen Station (五泉駅, Gosen-eki) is a railway station in the city of Gosen, Niigata, Niigata Prefecture, Japan, operated by East Japan Railway Company (JR East).

== Lines ==
Gosen Station is served by the Ban'etsu West Line, and is 165.7 kilometers from the terminus of the line at Kōriyama.

== Station layout ==
The station consists of one ground-level side platform and one island platform serving three tracks, connected by a footbridge. The station has a Midori no Madoguchi staffed ticket office.

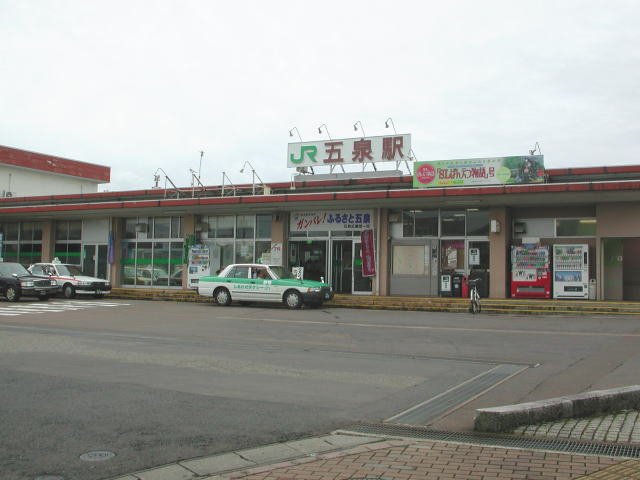
North side of Gosen Station, September 2004

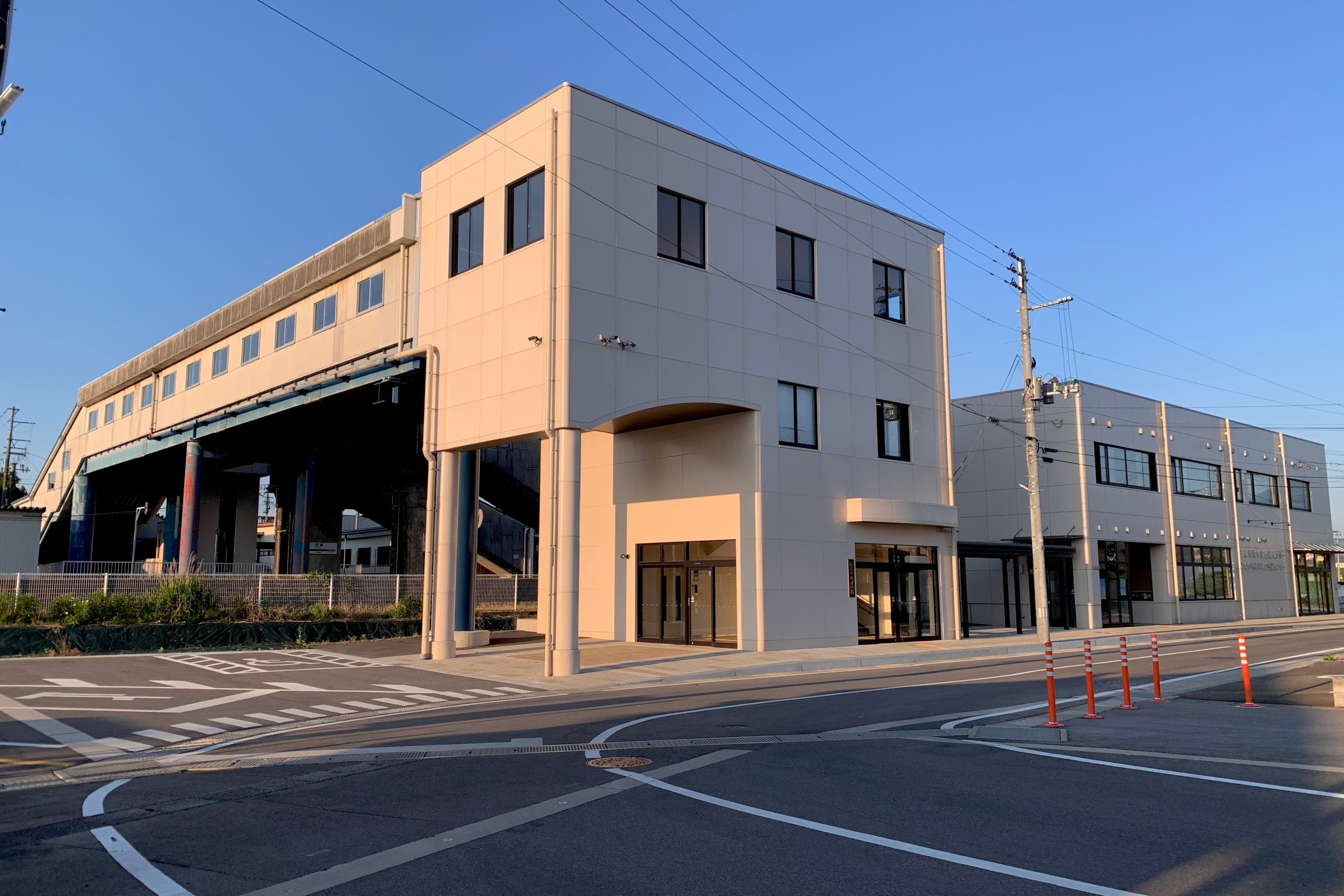
South side of Gosen Station, May 2020

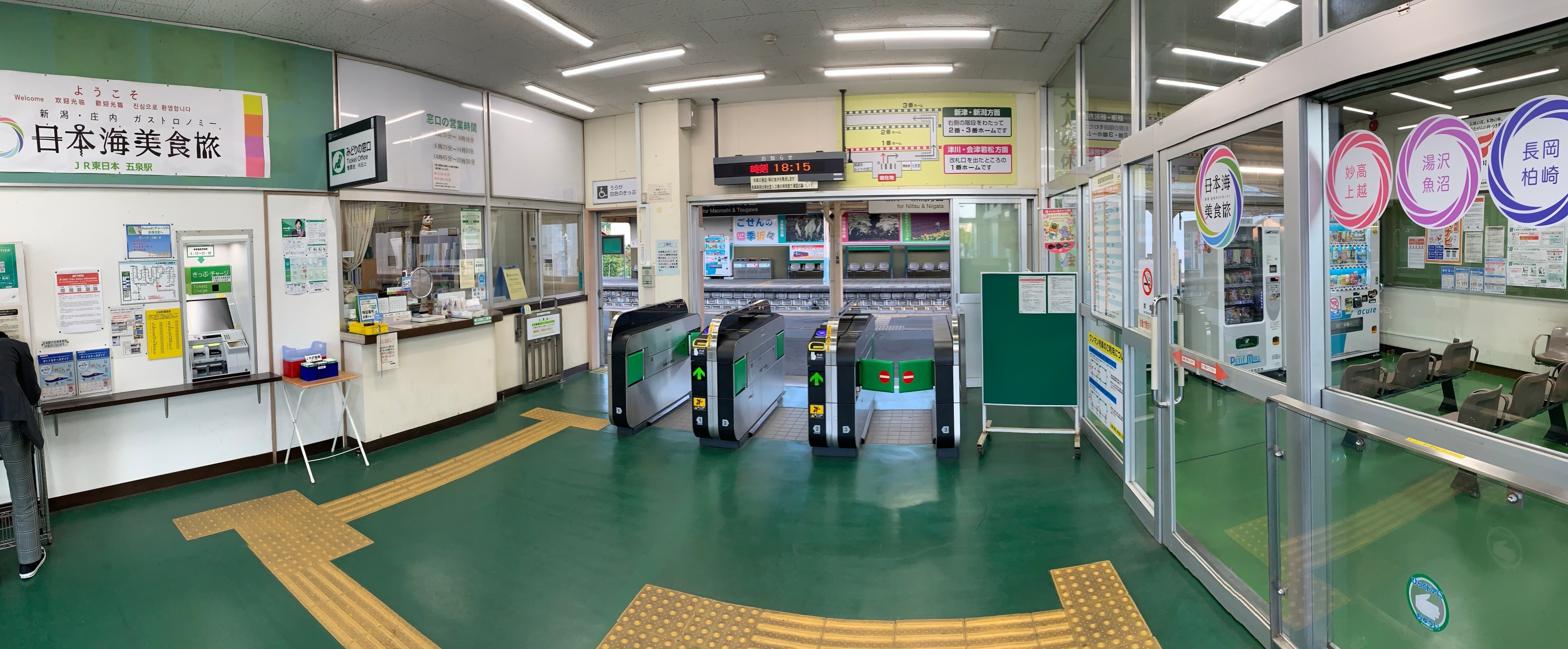
Station interior, May 2020

=== Platforms ===
1	■ Ban'etsu West Line	for Maoroshi, Tsugawa and Aizu-Wakamatsu
2, 3	■ Ban'etsu West Line	Niitsu and Niigata

== History ==
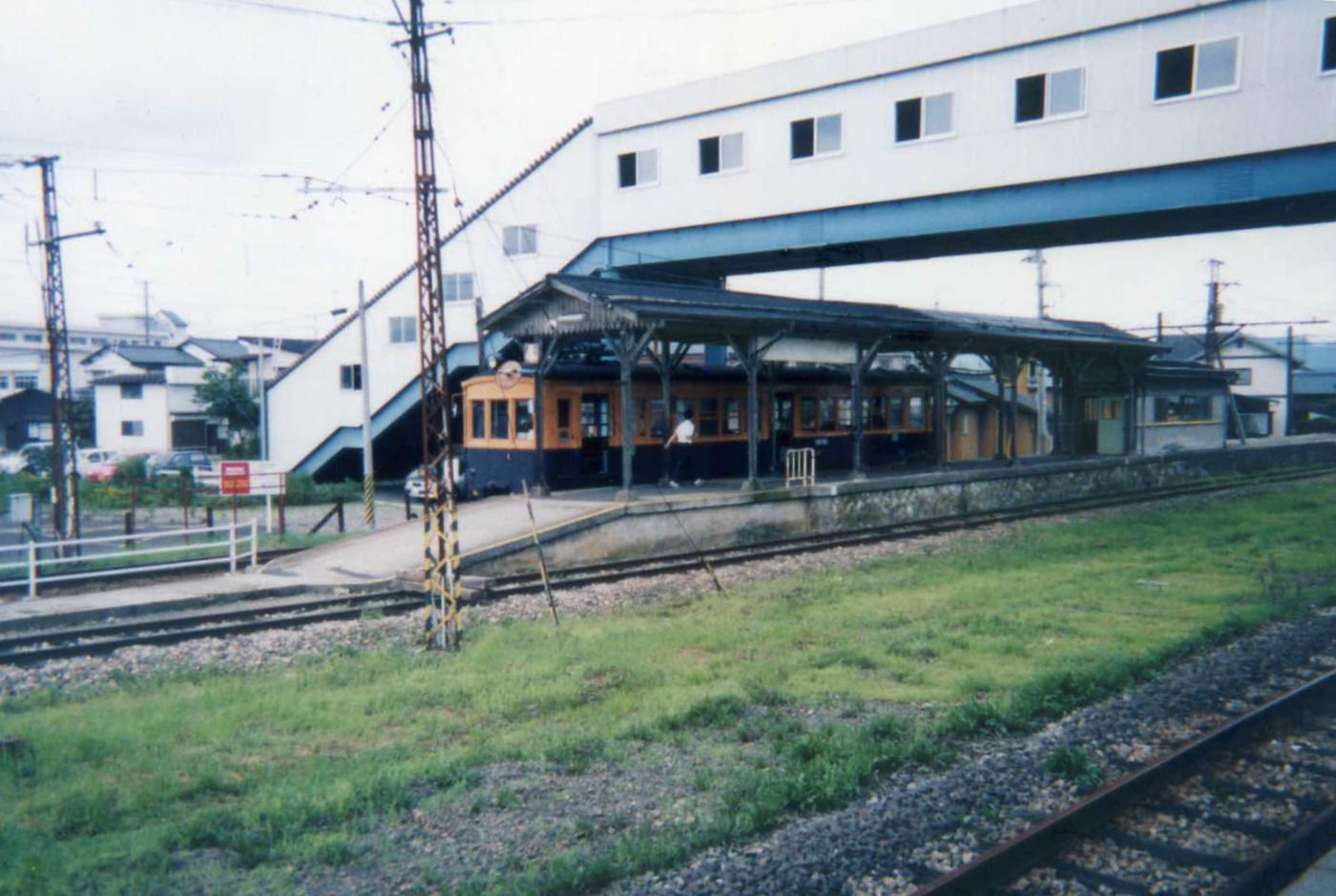
Platform of Kanbara Railway Line, May 1999

The station opened on 25 October 1910. The Kanbara Railway Company's Gosen Line formerly also operated from this station from 1923 to 1999. With the privatization of Japanese National Railways (JNR) on 1 April 1987, the station came under the control of JR East.

== Passenger statistics ==
In fiscal 2017, the station was used by an average of 1093 passengers daily (boarding passengers only).

== Surrounding area ==
- Gosen City Hall
- Gosen post Office
- Gosen Minami Elementary School
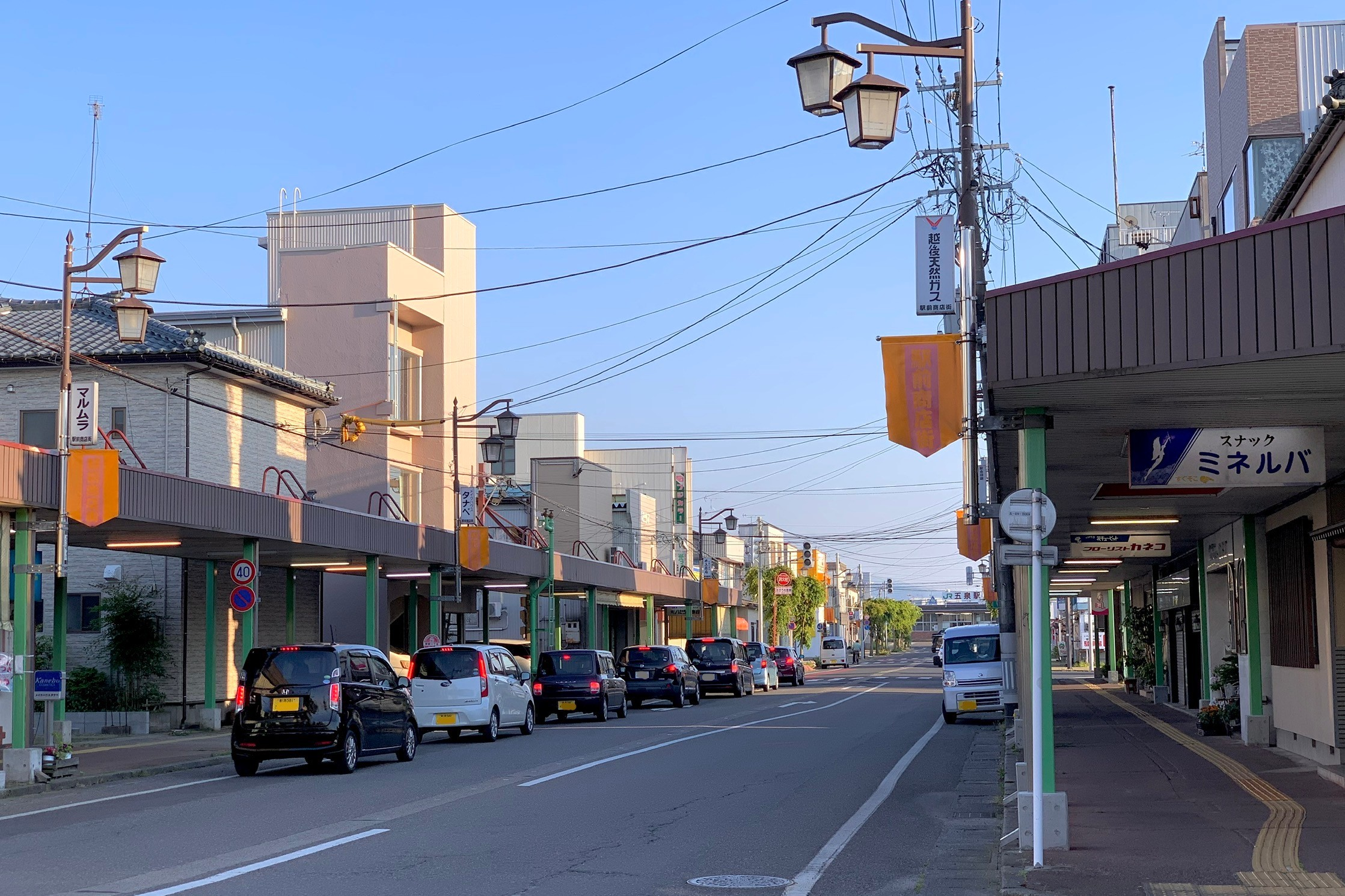
Ekimae Shopping Street, May 2020

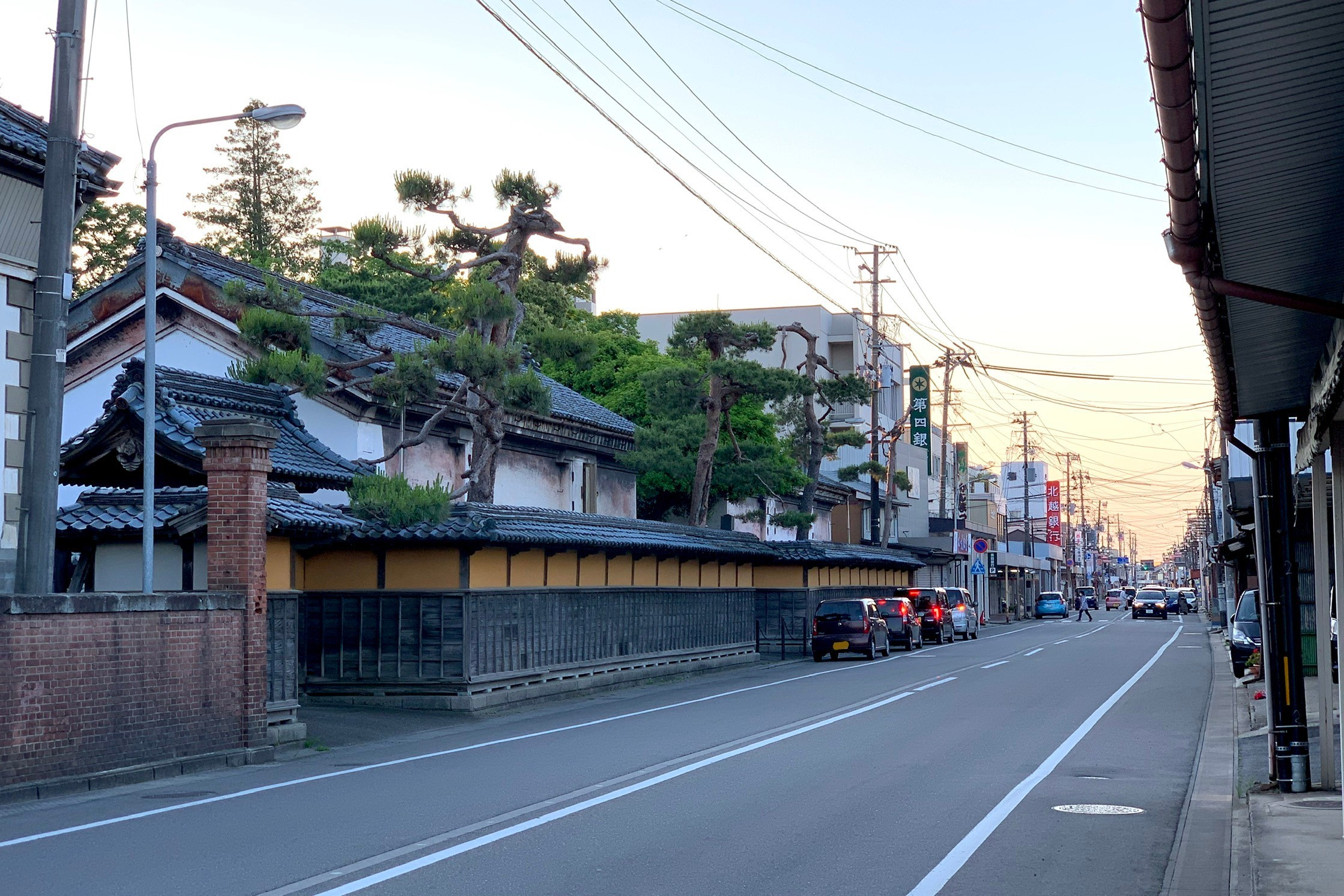
Honcho-dori Street (Niigata prefectural road 7), May 2020

== See also ==
- List of railway stations in Japan
