= Gosen, Niigata =

Gosen 五泉市
- City
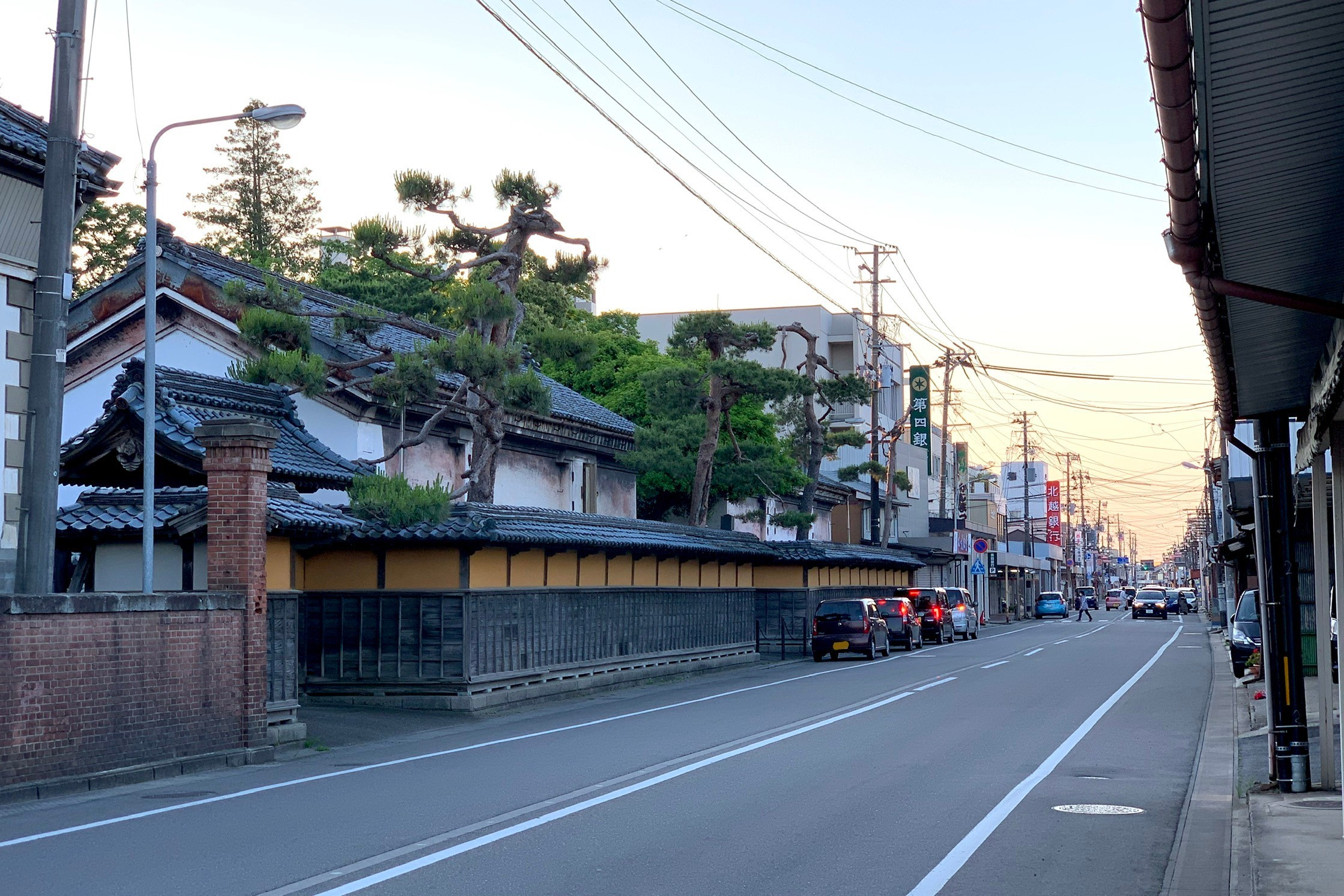
- Gosen Honcho Street

- Flag Seal

- Location of Gosen in Niigata

- Coordinates: 37°44′40″N 139°10′57.4″E
- Country: Japan
- Region: Chūbu (Kōshin'etsu) (Hokuriku)
- Prefecture: Niigata

Government
  - Mayor: Katsumi Itoh (since February 2010)

Area
  - Total: 351.91 km^{2} (135.87 sq mi)

Population (September 11, 2024)
  - Total: 45,916
  - Density: 130.48/km^{2} (337.93/sq mi)
- Time zone: UTC+9 (Japan Standard Time)
- Symbols
  - Tree: Sakura
  - Flower: Paeonia suffruticosa
- Phone number: 0250-43-3911
- Address: 1094-1 Ota, Gosen-shi, Niigata-ken 959-1692
- Website: Official website

Gosen (五泉市, Gosen-shi) is a city located in Niigata Prefecture, Japan. As of 11 September 2024, the city had an estimated population of 45,916 in 19,086 households, and a population density of 138 persons per km^{2}. The total area of the city is 351.91 square kilometres (135.87 sq mi).

== Geography ==
Gosen is located in an inland region of north-central Niigata Prefecture. The Agano River flows through the city.

=== Surrounding municipalities ===
- Niigata Prefecture
  - Aga
  - Akiha-ku, Niigata
  - Agano
  - Kamo
  - Sanjō
  - Tagami

== History ==
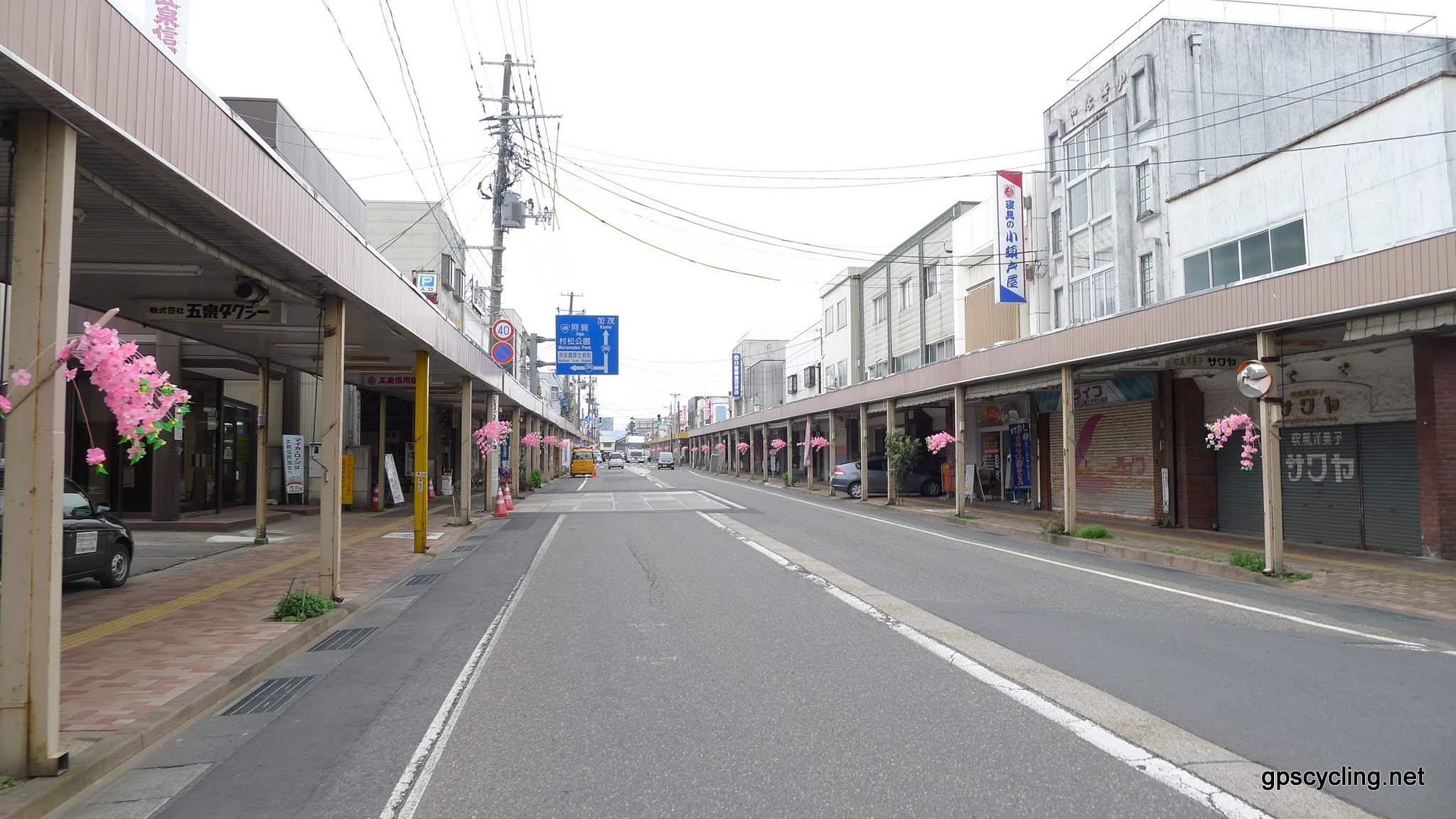
Central Muramatsu

The area of present-day Gosen was part of ancient Echigo Province. Under the Tokugawa shogunate of Edo period Japan, parts of what is now Gosen were under the control of Muramatsu Domain, a minor feudal domain ruled by a junior branch of the Hori clan.

=== Municipal timeline ===
- On April 1, 1889 - the town of Gosen was created within Kitakanbara District, Niigata with the establishment of the modern municipalities system.
- On November 3, 1954 - the modern city of Gosen was established from the merger of the town of Gosen with the villages of Sumoto, Kawahigashi and Hashida (all from Kitakanbara District).
- On January 1, 2006 - the town of Muramatsu (from Nakakanbara District) was merged into Gosen.

== Climate ==
Gosen has a humid climate (Köppen Cfa) characterized by warm, wet summers and cold winters with heavy snowfall. The average annual temperature in Gosen is 13.1 °C. The average annual rainfall is 1886 mm with September as the wettest month.The temperatures are highest on average in August, at around 26.2 °C, and lowest in January, at around1.3 °C.

== Demographics ==
Per Japanese census data, the population of Gosen has declined steadily over the past 40 years.

Historical population
Year	Pop.	±%
1970	62,038	—
1980	62,516	+0.8%
1990	61,289	−2.0%
2000	58,820	−4.0%
2010	54,550	−7.3%
2020	47,625	−12.7%

== Government ==
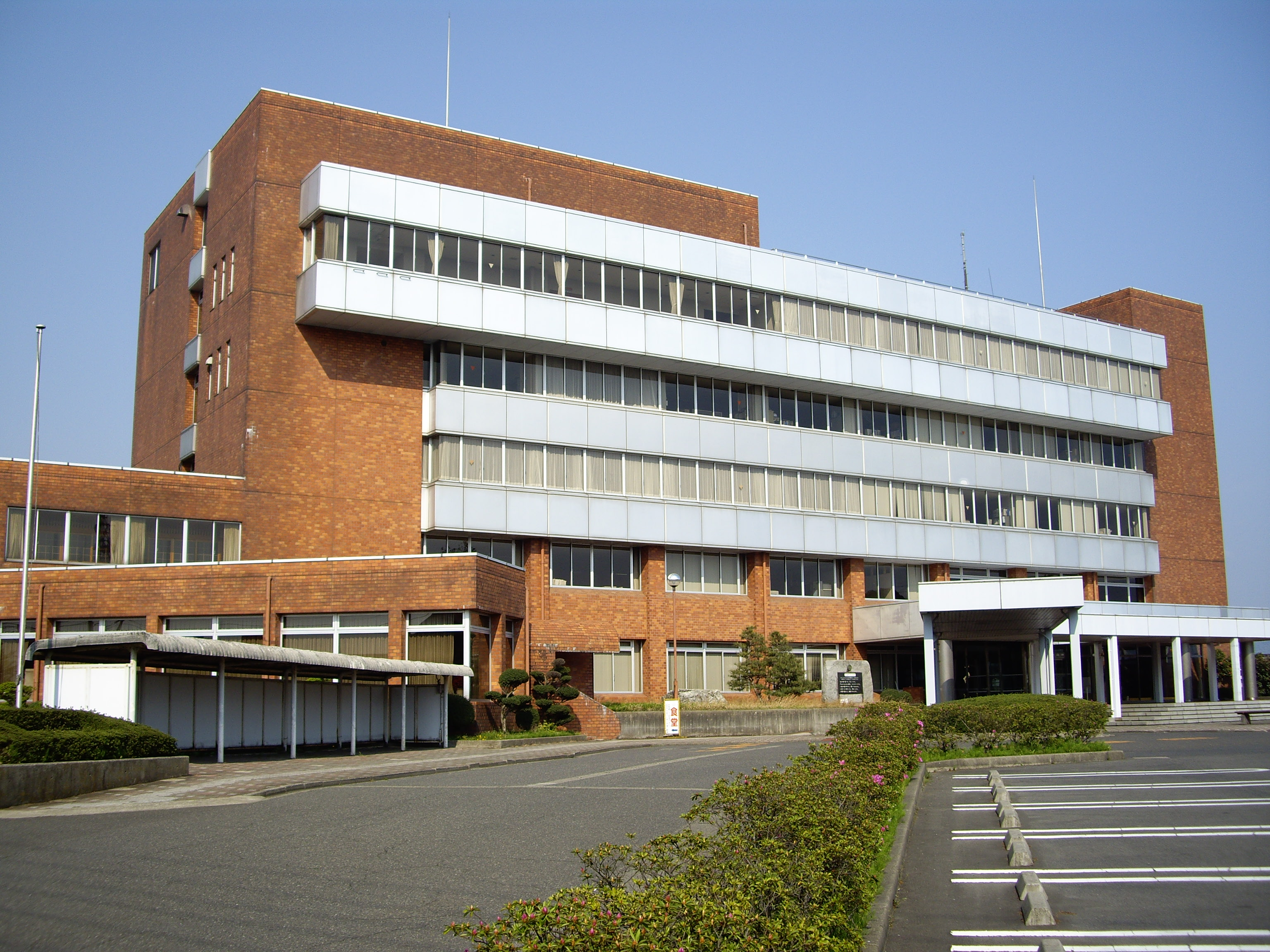
Gosen City Hall

Gosen has a mayor-council form of government with a directly elected mayor and a unicameral city legislature of 20 members.

== Economy ==
The economy of Gosen is primarily agricultural, with production of cut flowers, peonies, satoimo and kiwi fruit as important crops.

== Education ==
Gosen has eleven public elementary schools and four public junior high schools operated by the city government. There are two public high schools operated by the Niigata Prefectural Board of Education in the city. The prefecture also operates one special education school. Niigata University's Department of Agriculture has a field test farm in Gosen.

== Transportation ==
=== Railway ===
JR East - Banetsu West Line

- Sakihana - Maoroshi - Saruwada - Gosen - Kita-Gosen

=== Highway ===
- Ban-etsu Expressway – Gosen PA
- National Route 290

== Local attractions ==
- Sakihana onsen (咲花温泉)
- Muramatsu Park (村松公園)
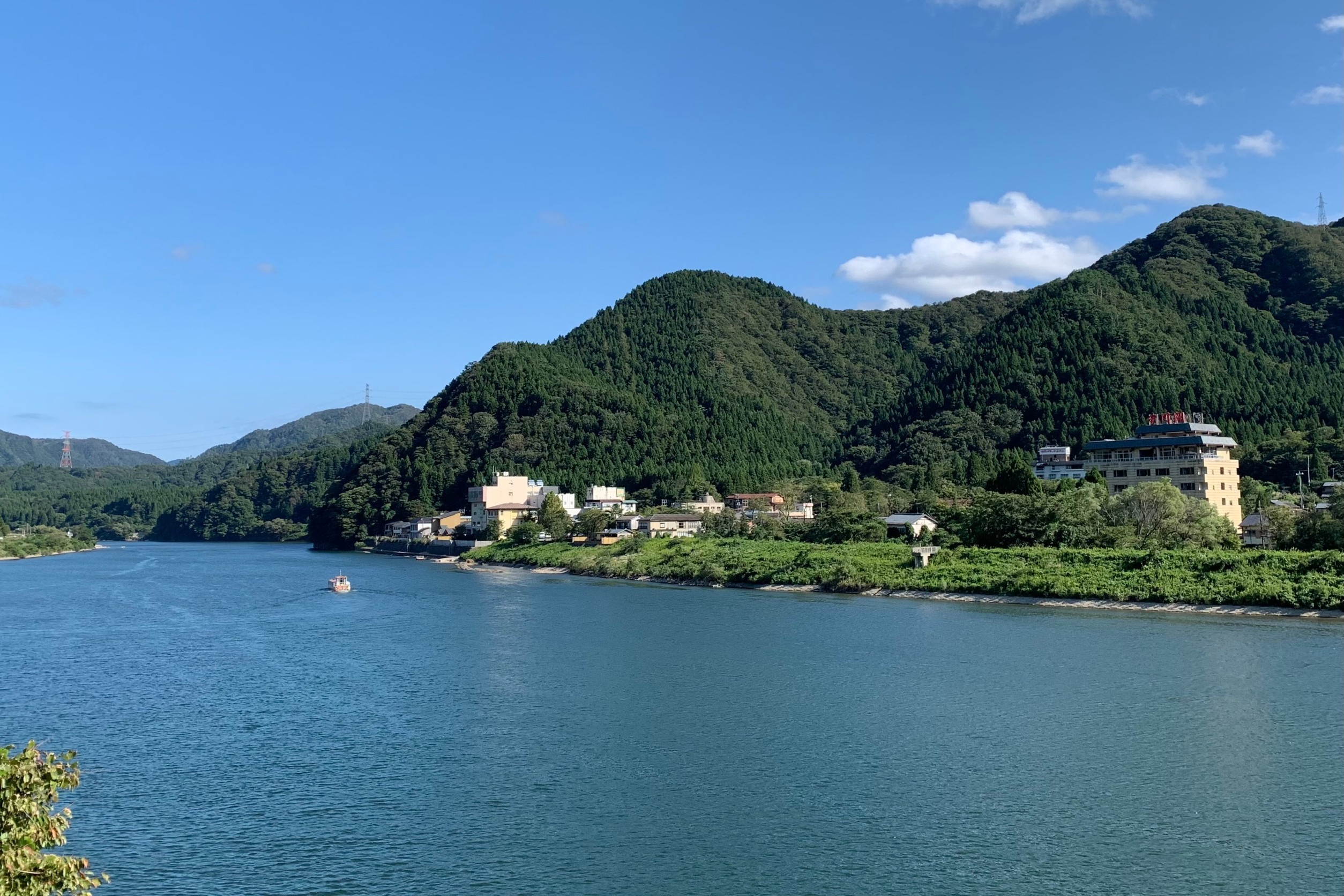
Agano River and Sakihana onsen

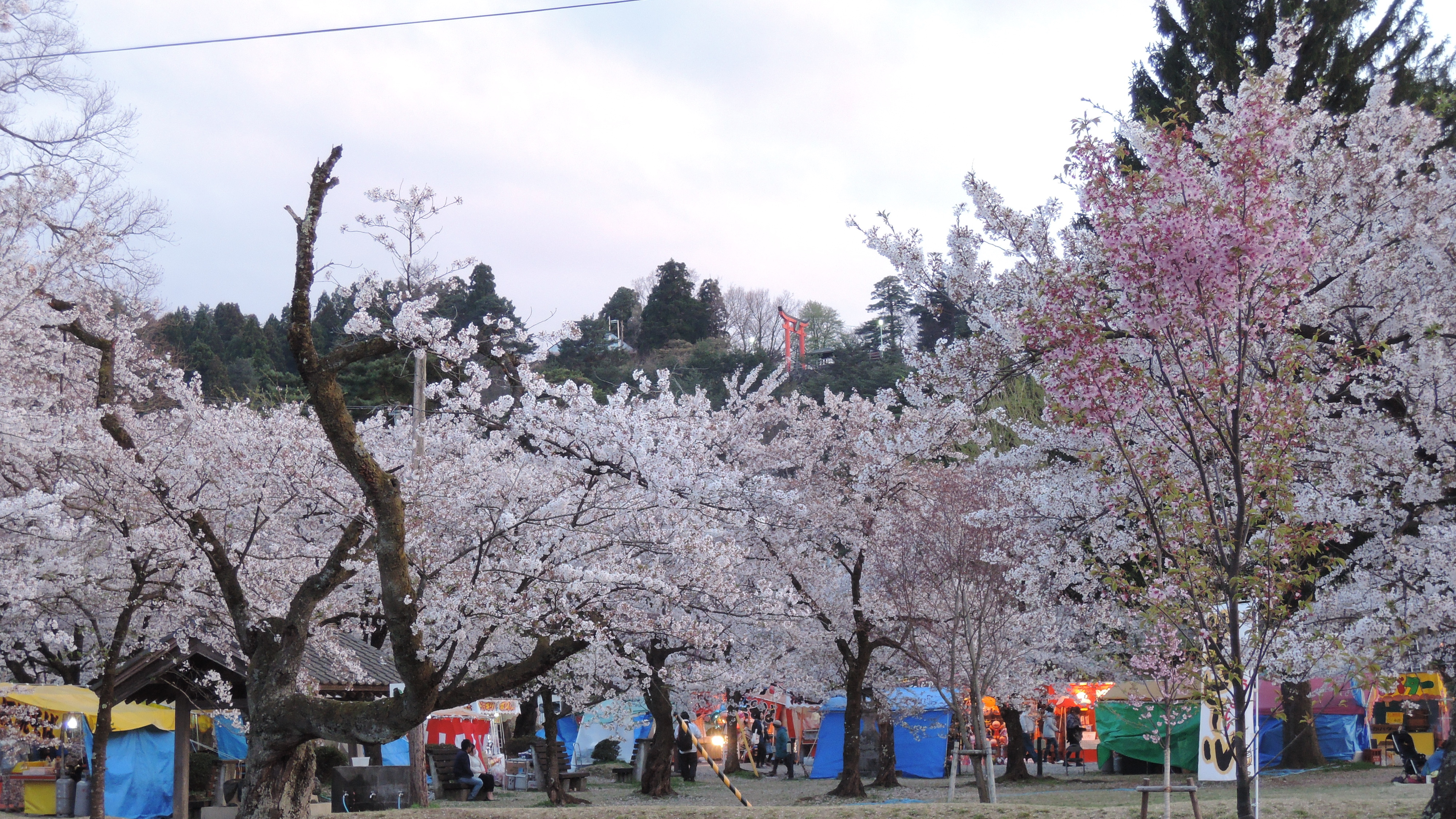
Sakura in Muramatsu Park

== Notable people from Gosen ==
- Kazuya Tsurumaki (anime director)
- Kimio Yanagisawa (manga artist)
- Kokoro Toyoshima (model, actress)
- Yoshifumi Kondō (anime director, character designer)
