= Hokuetsu =

Japanese train service

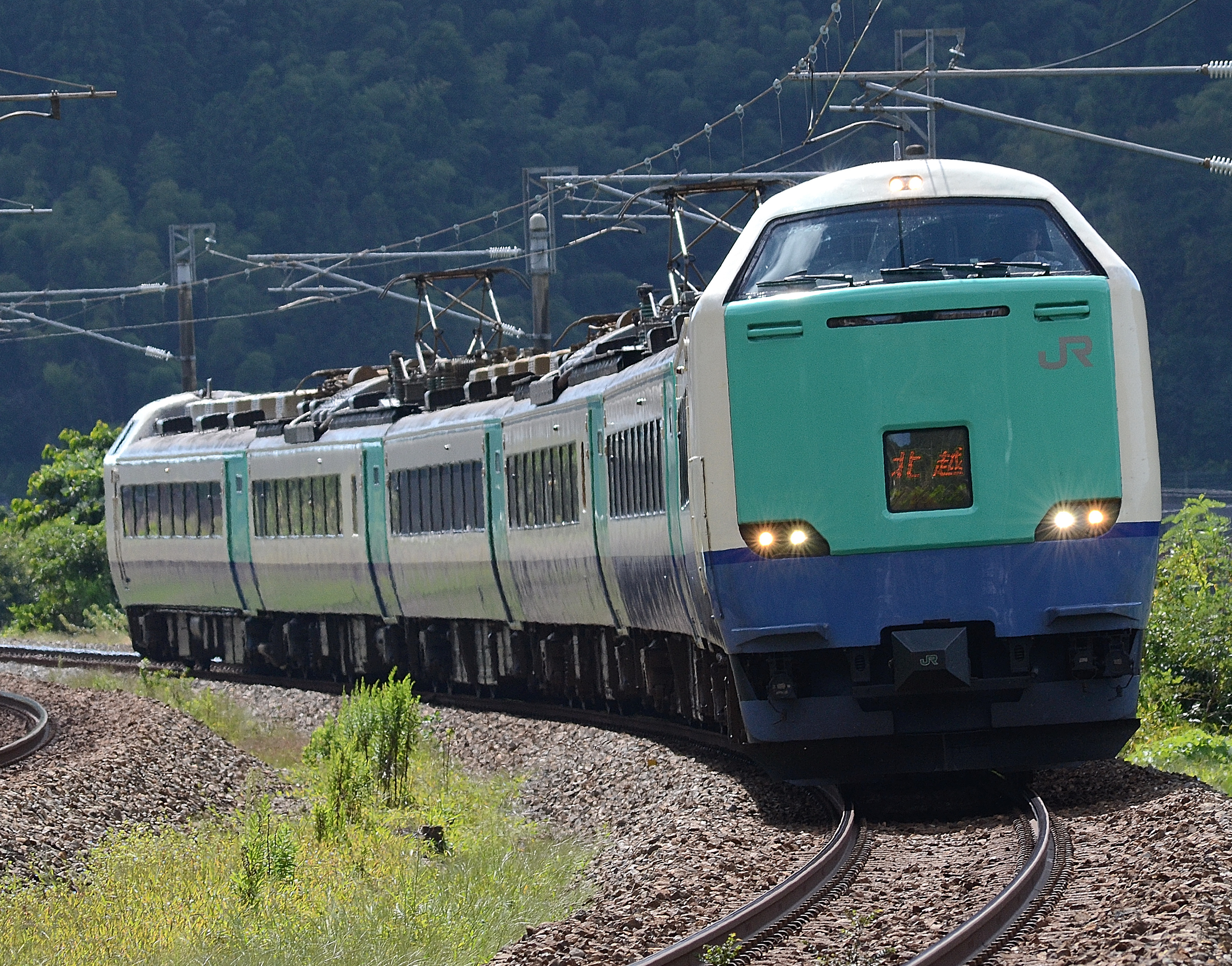
- A 485-3000 series EMU on a Hokuetsu service, September 2014

Overview
- Service type: Limited express
- Status: Discontinued
- Locale: Japan
- First service: 1 March 1970
- Last service: 13 March 2015
- Former operator(s): JNR; JR East

Route
- Termini: Kanazawa; Niigata
- Service frequency: 5 return services daily
- Line(s) used: Hokuriku Main Line, Shinetsu Main Line

On-board services
- Class(es): Standard + Green
- Seating arrangements: 2+2 unidirectional

Technical
- Rolling stock: 485 series EMU
- Track gauge: 1,067 mm (3 ft 6 in)
- Electrification: 20 kV AC
- Operating speed: 120 km/h (75 mph)

The Hokuetsu (北越) was a limited express train service in Japan formerly operated by Japanese National Railways (JNR) and later by East Japan Railway Company (JR East) between Kanazawa and Niigata from 1970 until March 2015.

== Rolling stock ==
Hokuetsu services were normally formed of 6-car 485 series (sets T12–16) or refurbished 485-3000 series electric multiple unit EMU trainsets (sets R21–28), based at Niigata Depot.

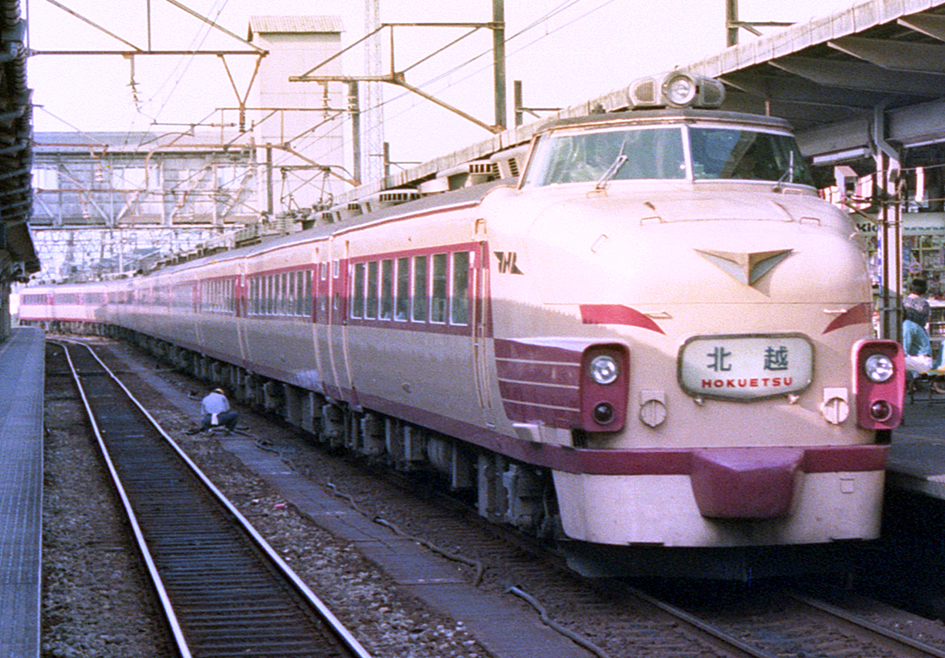
Original "bonnet-style" 485 series EMU, 1982

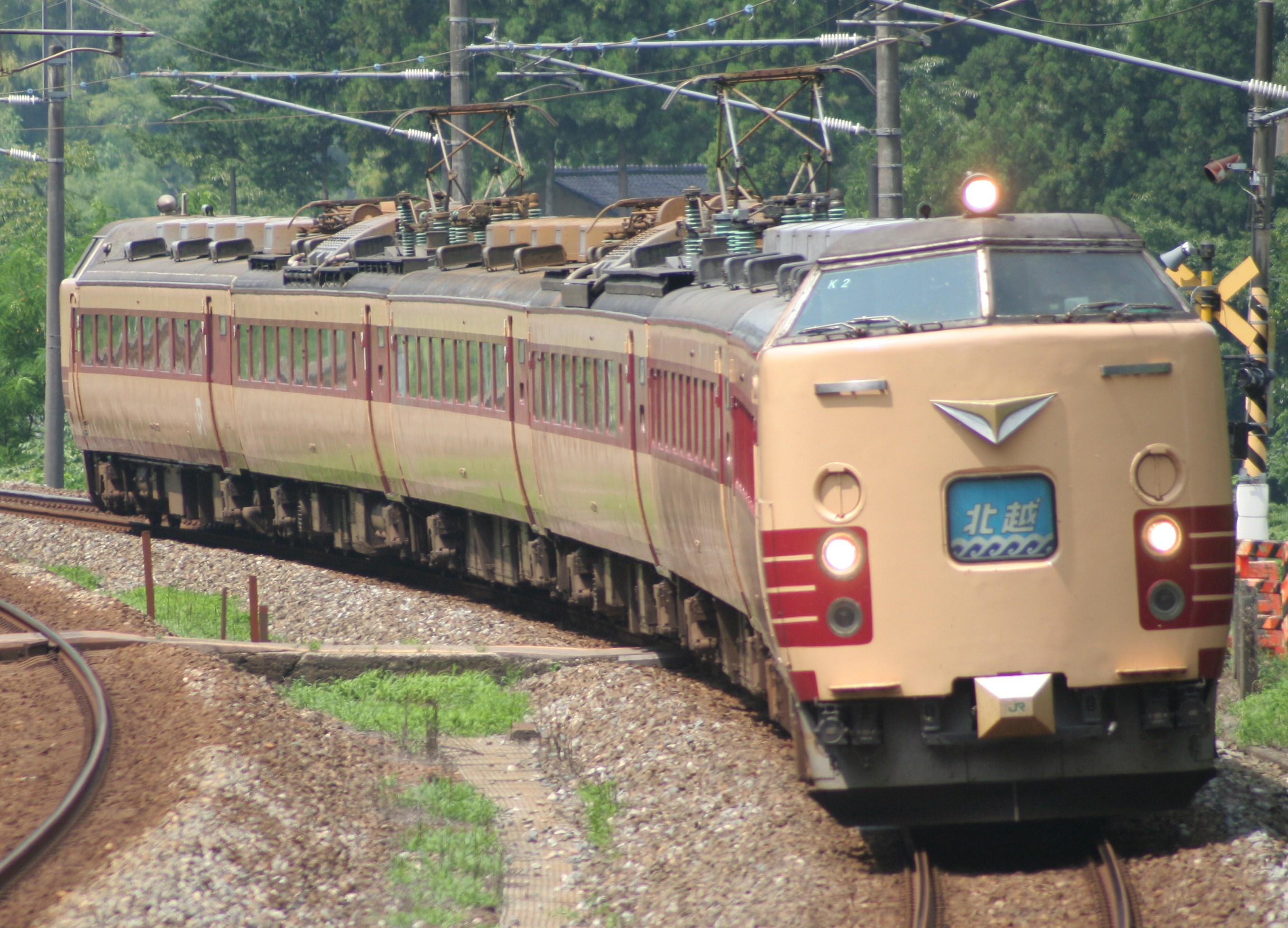
JNR-liveried 485 series EMU, August 2010

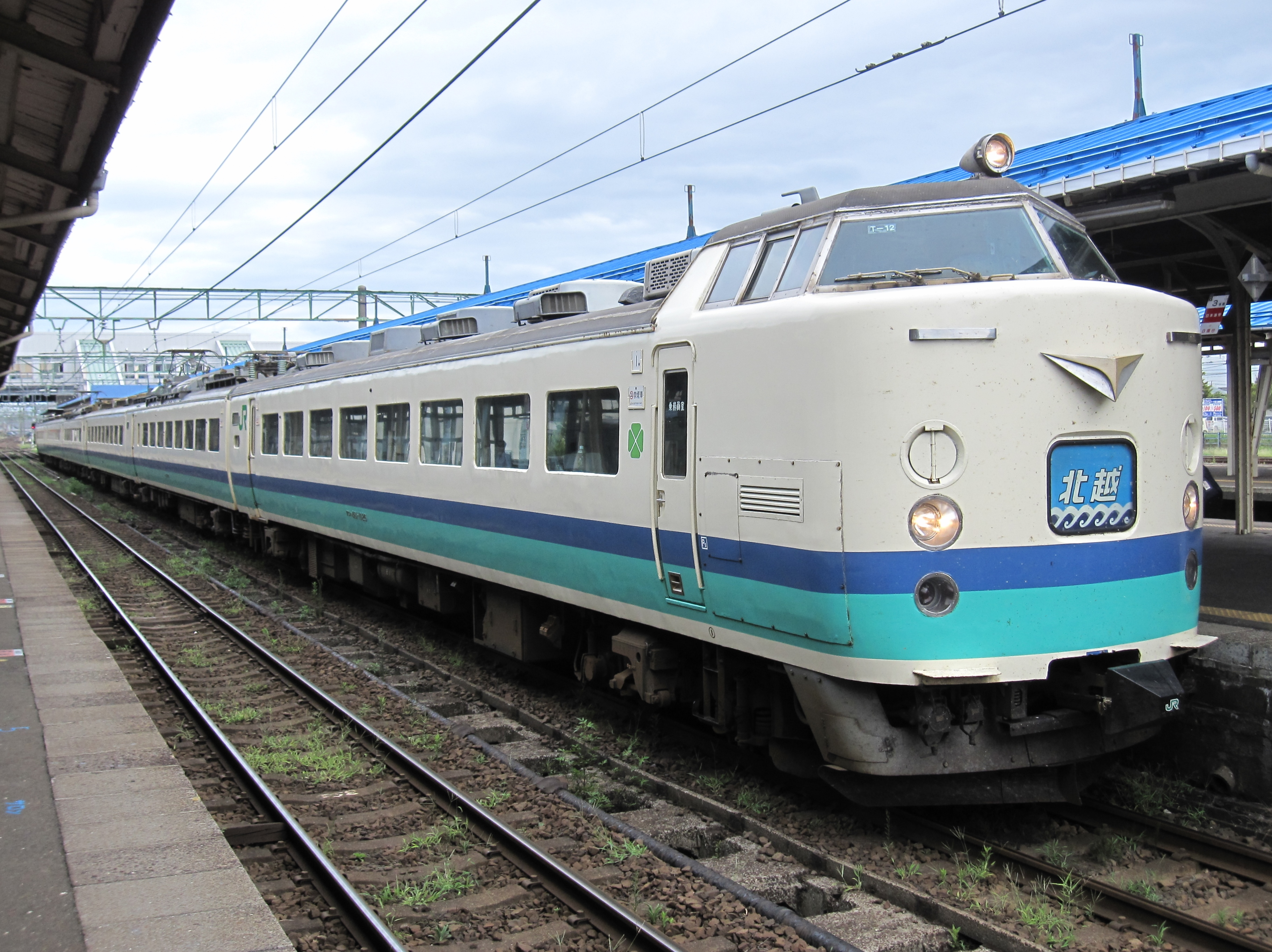
485 series in revised livery, September 2010

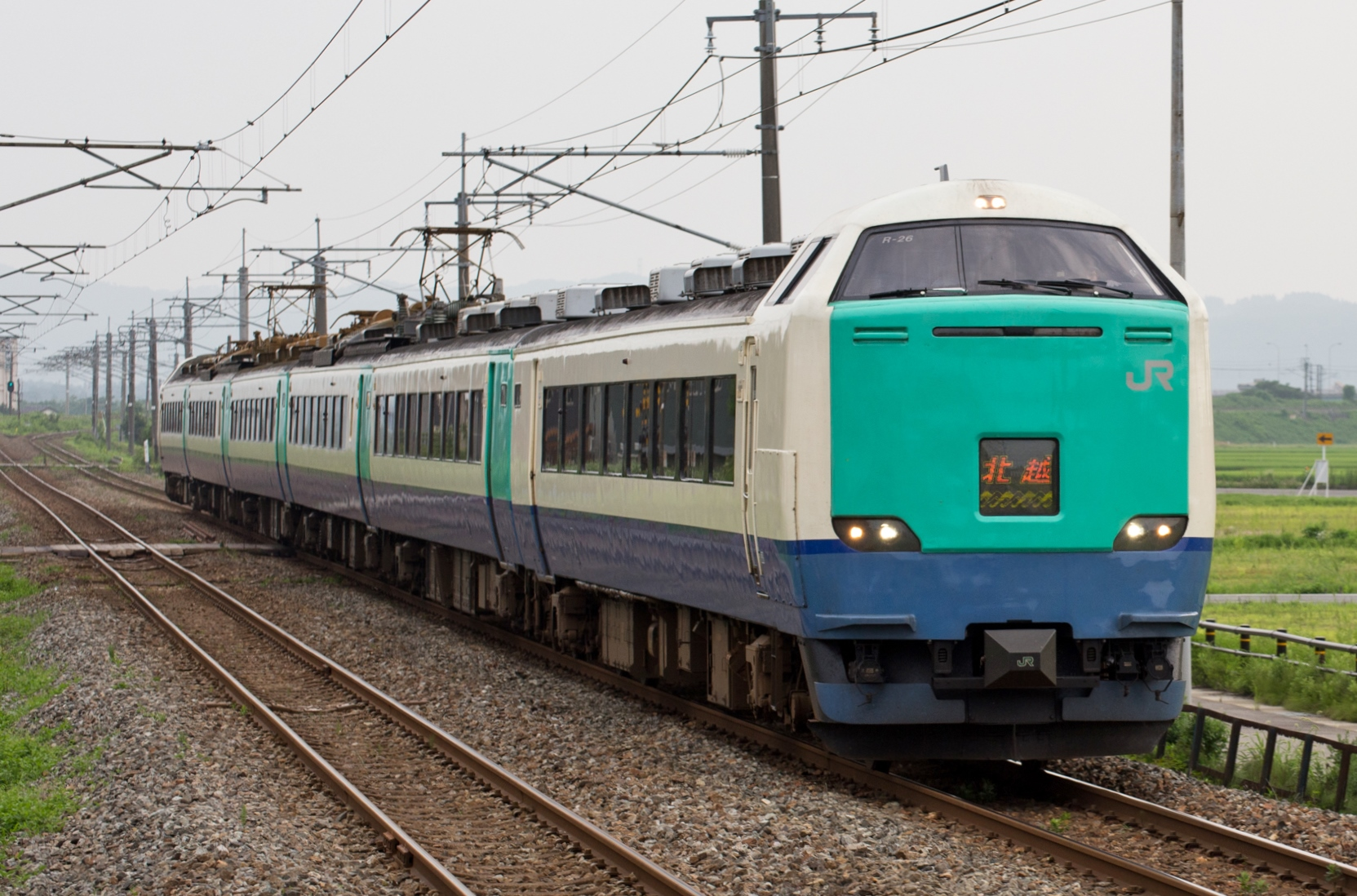
485-3000 series set R-26, July 2013

== Formations ==
The six-car 485 series sets were formed with car 1 at the Kanazawa end and car 6 at the Niigata end. All cars are no smoking.

Car No.	1		2	3	4	5	6
Numbering	KuRoHa 481		MoHa 484	MoHa 485	MoHa 484	MoHa 485	KuHa 481
Accommodation	Green	Reserved	Reserved	Reserved	Non-reserved	Non-reserved	Non-reserved

The 485 series sets had toilets in each car, while 485-3000 series sets had toilets in 1, 2, 4, and 6 only.

== History ==
The Hokuetsu was first introduced from 1 March 1970 as a limited express operating between Osaka and Niigata. From 2 October 1978, the operating route was shortened to Kanazawa to Niigata.

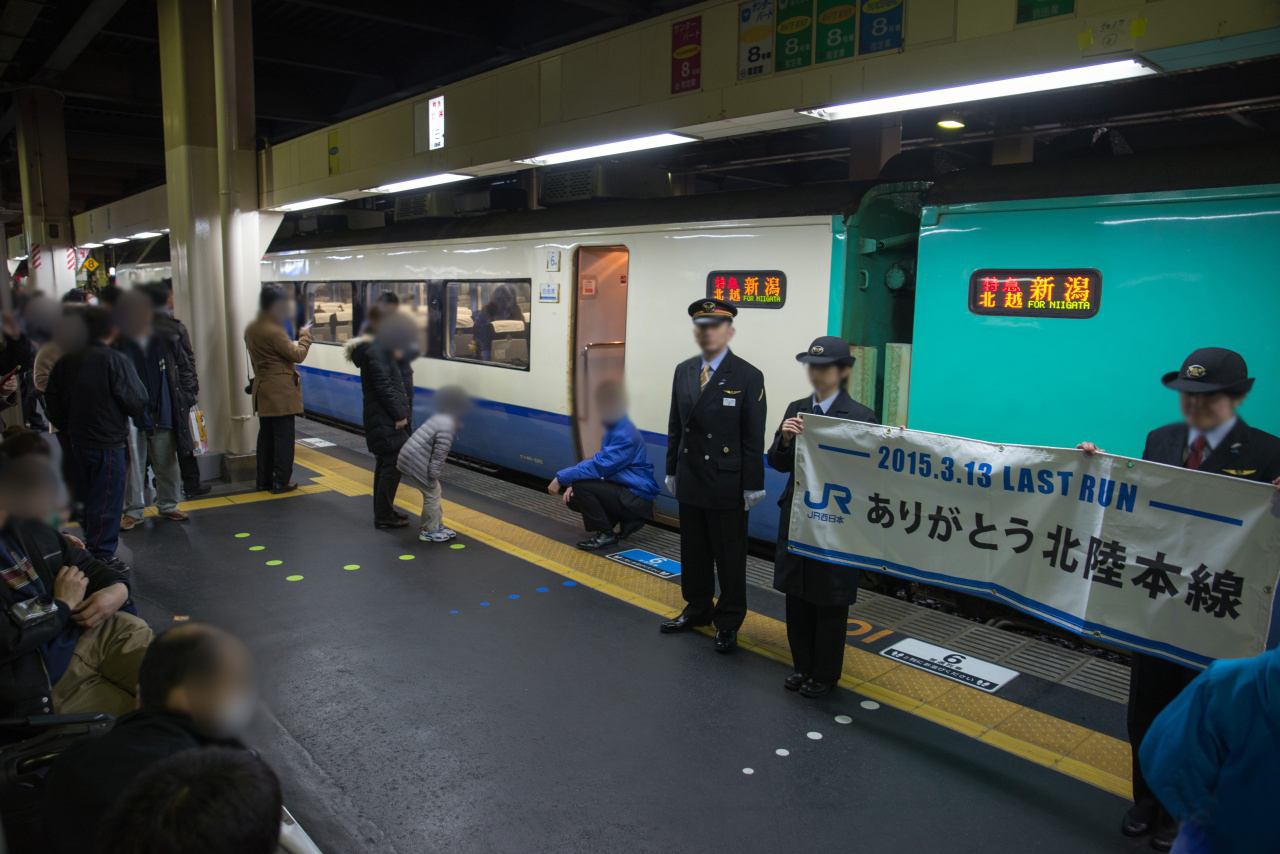
JR staff holding a "Thank you" banner on the platform at Kanazawa Station prior to the departure of the final Hokuetsu service to Niigata on 13 March 2015

Hokuetsu services were discontinued from the start of the 14 March 2015 timetable revision, with the opening of the Hokuriku Shinkansen between Nagano and Kanazawa.
