= Niigata Chuoh Junior College =

Coordinates: 37°40′26.2″N 139°3′30.8″E

Niigata Chuoh Junior College (新潟中央短期大学, Niigata chūō tanki daigaku) is a private junior college in Kamo, Niigata, Japan, established in 1968.
