= Japan National Route 290 =

Road in Niigata prefecture, Japan

National Route 290
- 国道290号
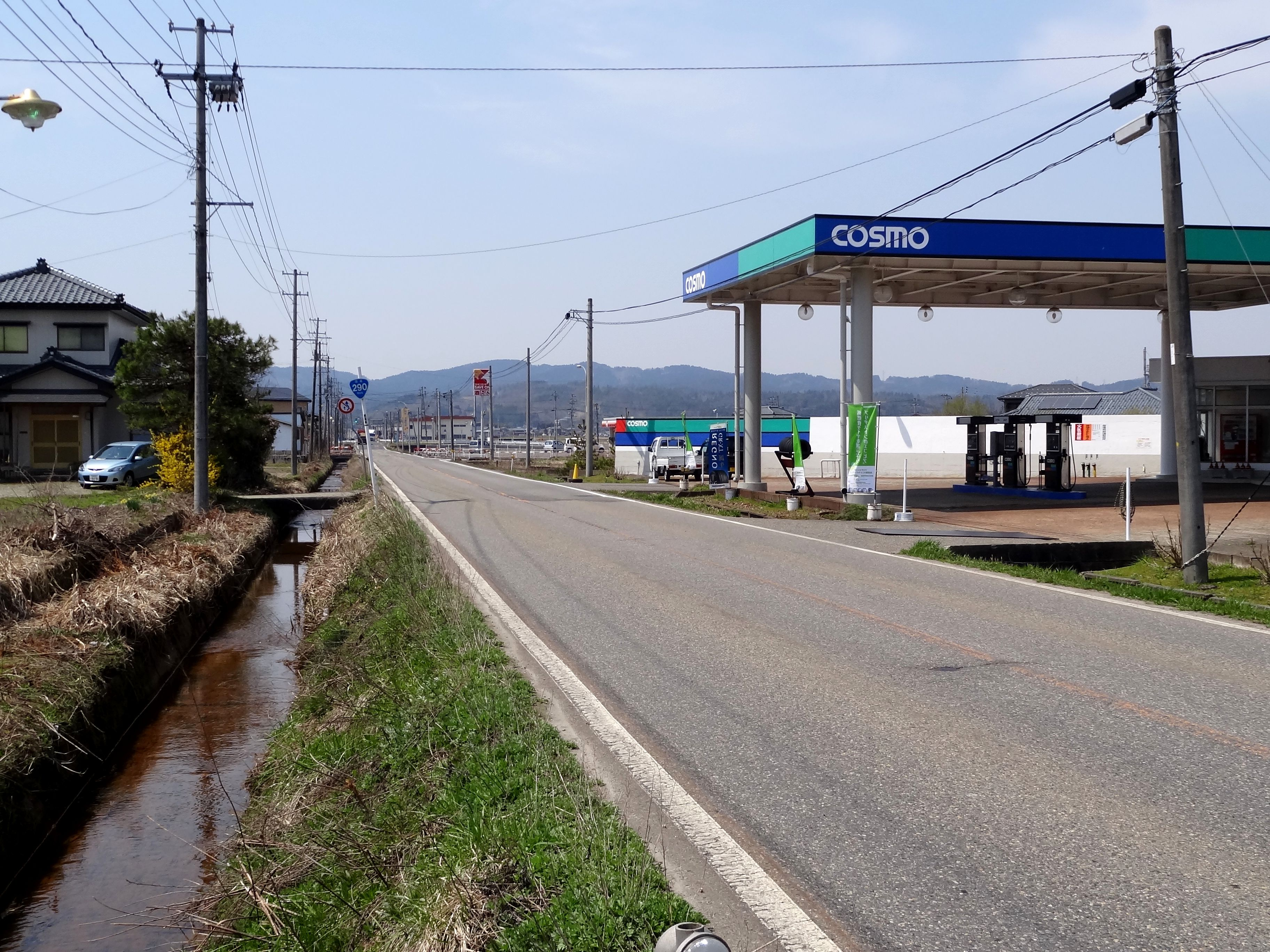

Route information
- Length: 165.5 km (102.8 mi)

Location
- Country: Japan

Highway system
- National highways of Japan; Expressways of Japan
← National Route 289	→ National Route 291

National Route 290 is a national highway of Japan connecting Murakami, Niigata and Uonuma, Niigata in Japan, with a total length of 165.5 km (102.84 mi).
