= Furutsu Station =

Railway station in Niigata, Japan

Furutsu Station 古津駅
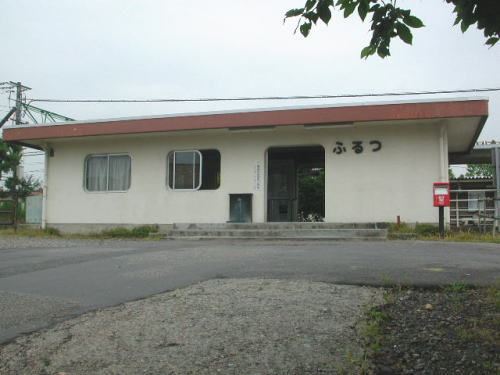
- Furutsu Station in July 2004

General information
- Location: Asahi, Akiha-ku, Niigata-shi, Niigata-ken 956-0835; Japan
- Coordinates: 37.7728°N 139.1143°E
- Operator: JR East
- Line: ■ Shin'etsu Main Line
- Distance: 117.9 km from Naoetsu
- Platforms: 2 side platforms
- Tracks: 2

Other information
- Status: Unstaffed
- Website: Official website

History
- Opened: 28 May 1949; 77 years ago

Passengers
- FY2010: 995 daily

Services
Preceding station	JR East	Following station
Yashiroda towards Naoetsu	Shin'etsu Main Line Local	Niitsu towards Niigata
Location
- Location within JR Shinetsu Main Line Location within Japan

Furutsu Station (古津駅, Furutsu-eki) is a train station in Akiha-ku, Niigata, Niigata Prefecture, Japan.

== Lines ==
Furutsu Station is served by the Shinetsu Main Line and is 117.9 kilometers from the terminus of the line at Naoetsu.

== Layout ==
The station consists of two ground-level opposed side platforms serving two tracks, connected by a footbridge. The station is unattended.

=== Platforms ===
1	■ Shin'etsu Main Line	for Hanyūda, Nagaoka
2	■ Shin'etsu Main Line	for Niitsu, Niigata

== History ==
The station opened on 28 May 1949. With the privatization of Japanese National Railways (JNR) on 1 April 1987, the station came under the control of JR East.

== Surrounding area ==
- Niigata University of Pharmacy and Applied Life Sciences
- Kanetsu Middle School
- Kanetsu Elementary School
- National Route 403

== See also ==
- List of railway stations in Japan
