= Akiha-ku =

Ward of Niigata City in Chūbu, Japan

Akiha-ku 秋葉区
- Ward
- Akiha Ward
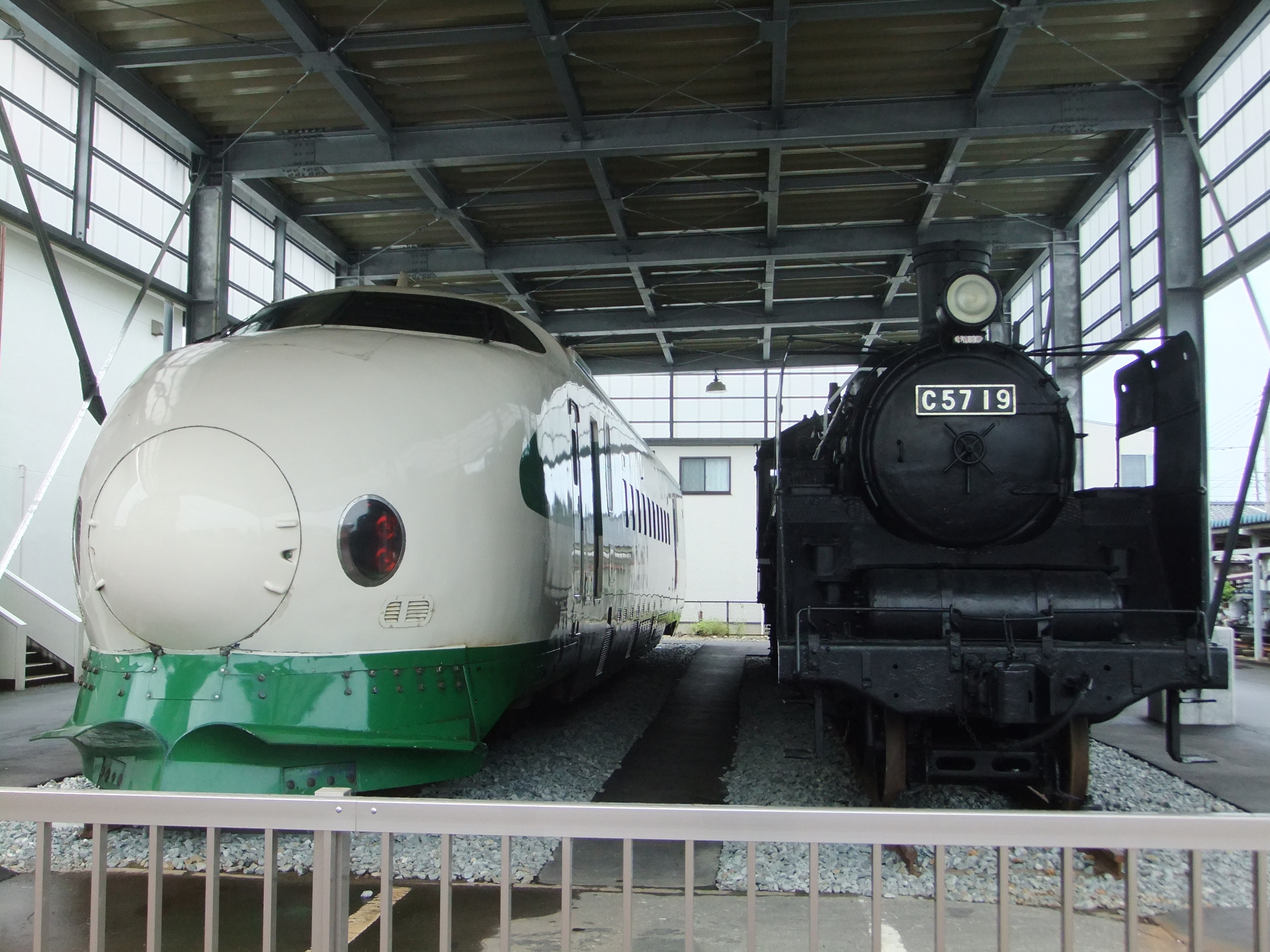
- Niitsu Raiilway Museum

- Location of Akiha-ku in Niigata City

- Coordinates: 37°47′18.6″N 139°6′52.5″E
- Country: Japan
- Region: Kōshin'etsu, Hokuriku (Chūbu)
- Prefecture: Niigata
- City: Niigata

Area
  - Total: 95.38 km^{2} (36.83 sq mi)

Population (September 2018)
  - Total: 76,086
  - Density: 797.7/km^{2} (2,066/sq mi)
- Time zone: UTC+9 (Japan Standard Time)
- Address: 2009 Hodojima, Akiha-ku, Niigata-shi, Niigata-ken 956-8601
- Phone number: 0250-23-1000
- Climate: Cfa
- Website: Official website

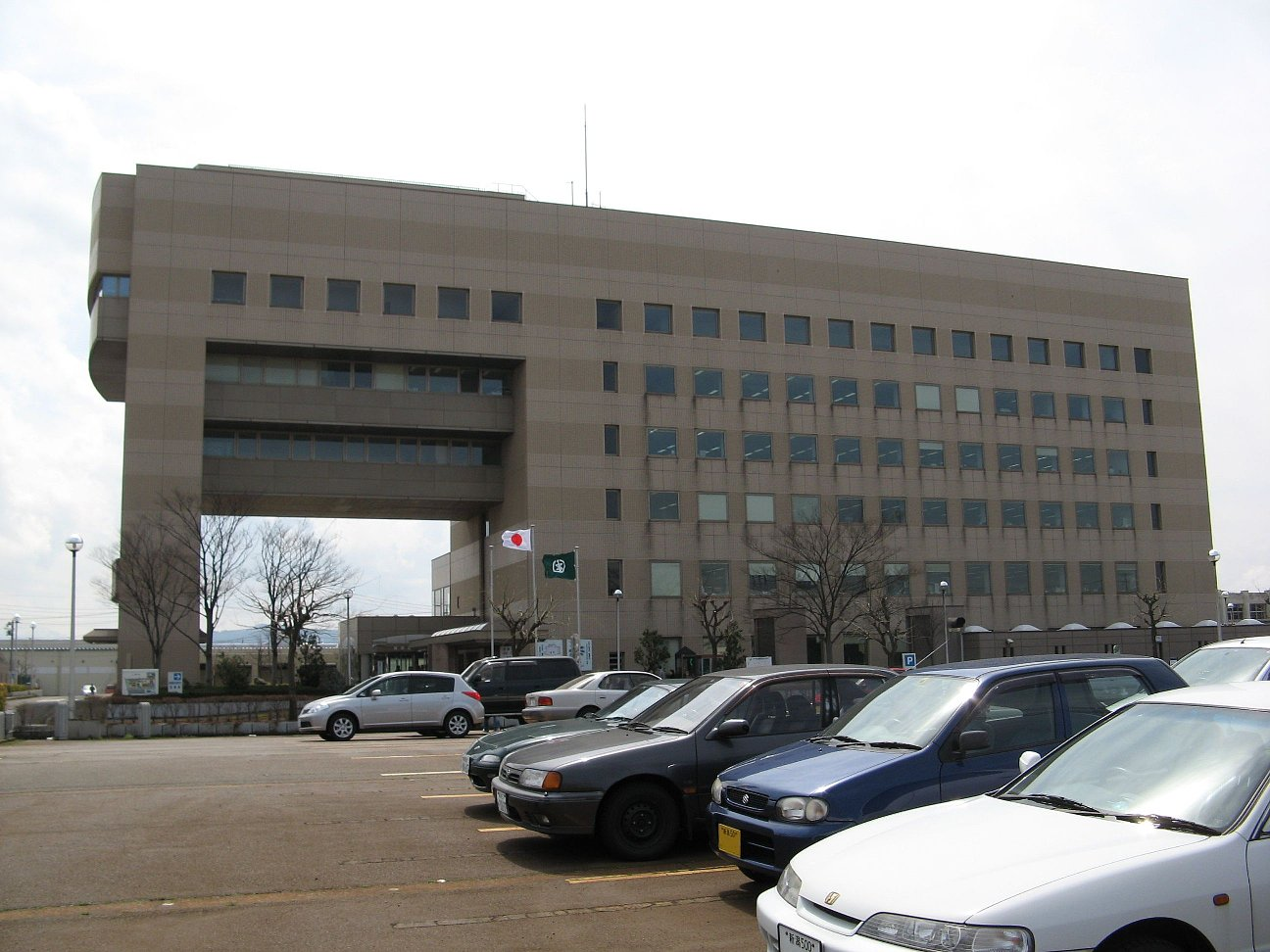
Akiha Ward Office

Akiha-ku (秋葉区, Akiha-ku) is one of the eight wards of Niigata City, Niigata Prefecture, in the Hokuriku region of Japan. As of 1 September 2018, the ward had an estimated population of 76,086 in 29,843 households and a population density of 800 persons per km². The total area of the ward was 95.38 square kilometres (36.83 sq mi).

== Geography ==
Akiha-ku is located in an inland region of north-central Niigata Prefecture. Both the Agano River and the Shinano River flow through the ward.

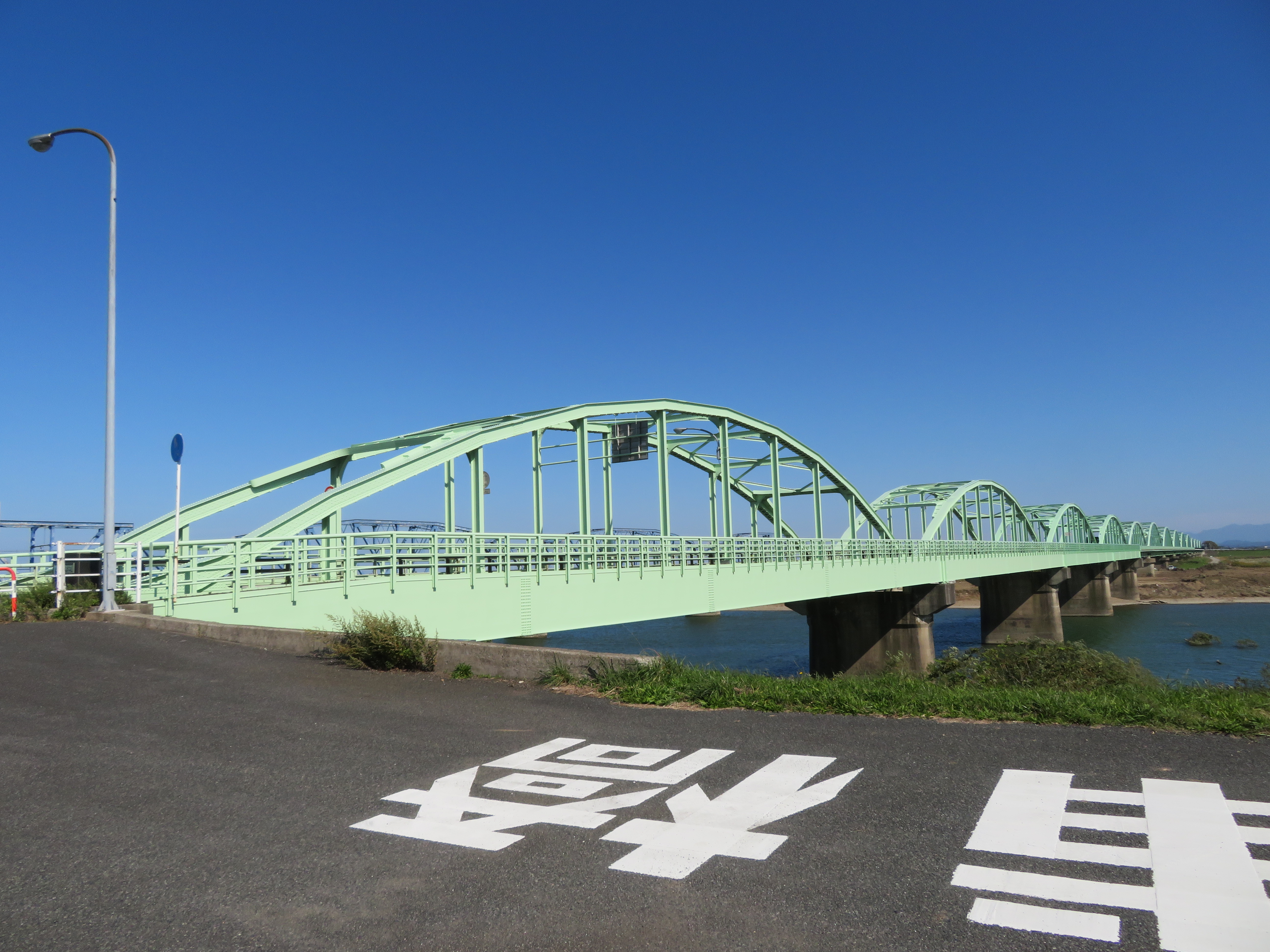
Agaura Bridge over the Agano River

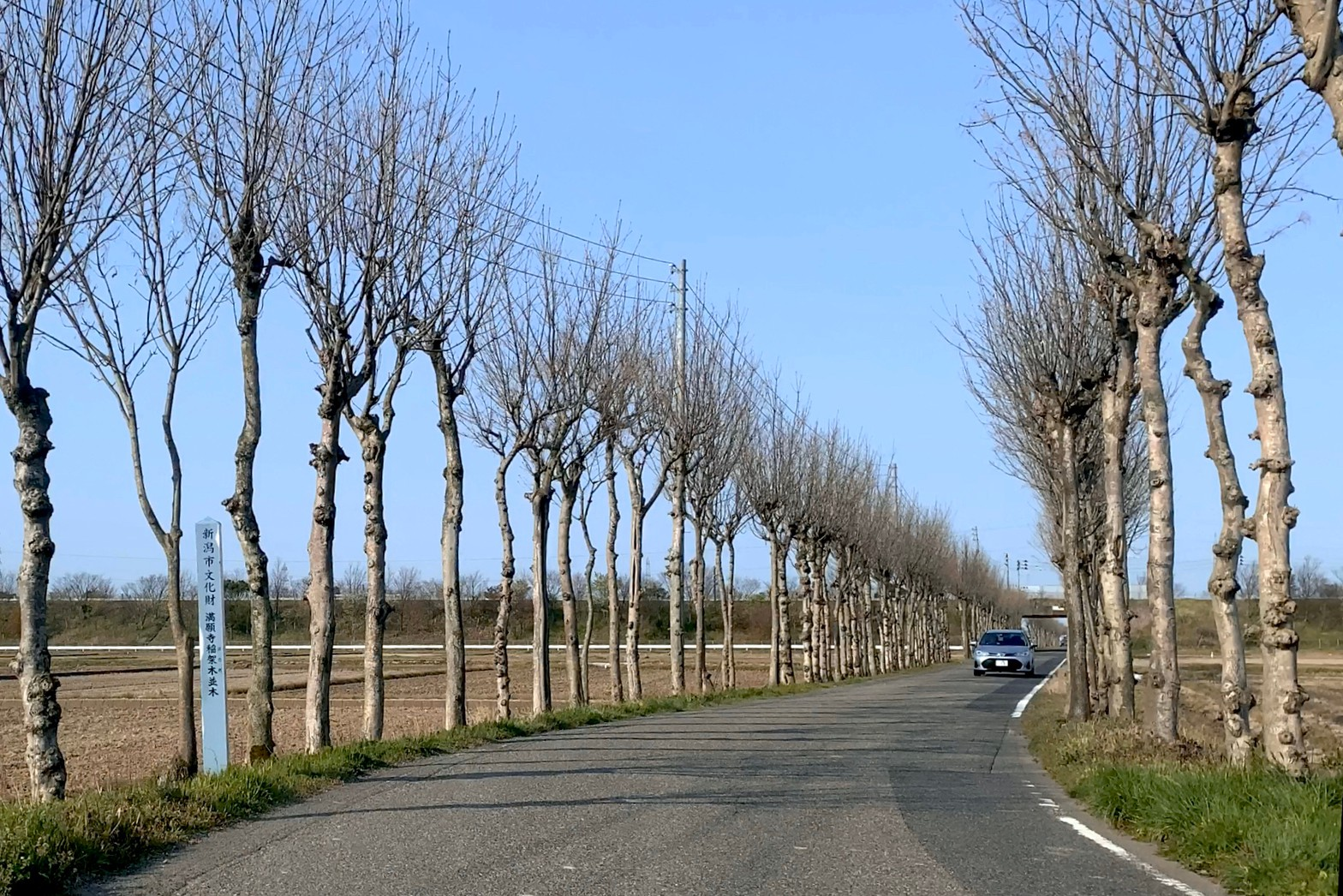
Manganji Hasagi Street

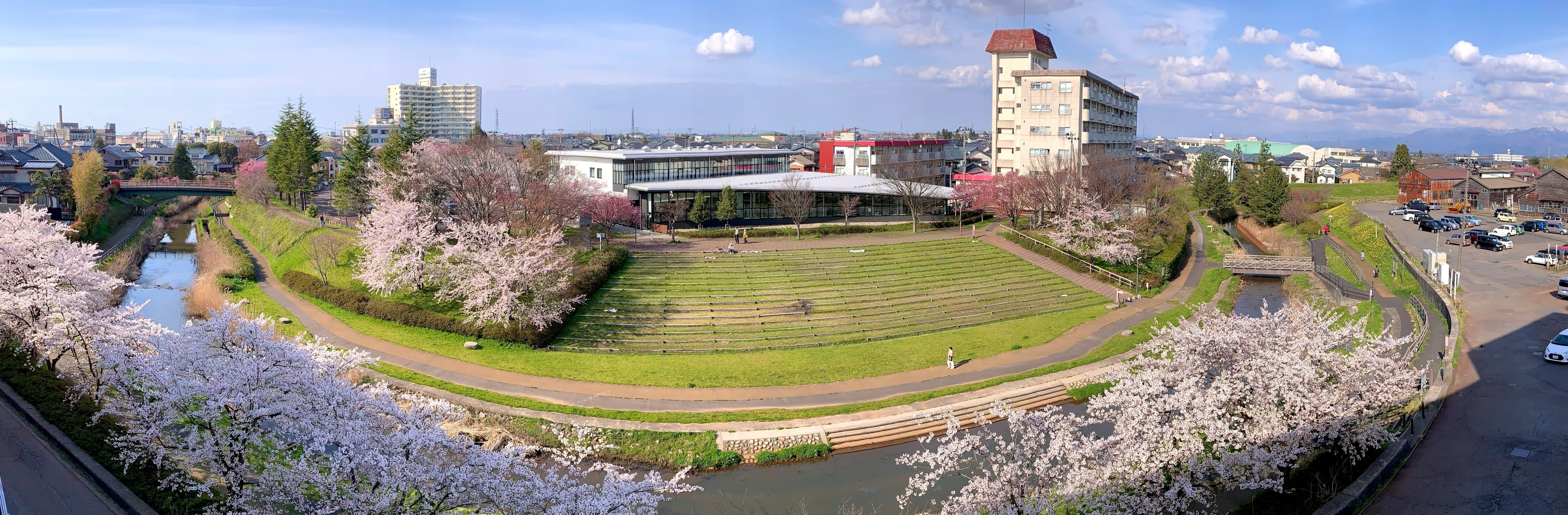
Niitsu River and Niitsu Library

=== Surrounding municipalities ===
- Niigata Prefecture
  - Konan-ku, Niigata
  - Minami-ku, Niigata
  - Gosen
  - Agano
  - Tagami

=== Climate ===
Akiha-ku has a Humid climate (Köppen Cfa) characterized by warm, wet summers and cold winters with heavy snowfall. The average annual temperature in Akiha-ku is 13.2 °C (55.8 °F). The average annual rainfall is 1,877.1 mm (73.90 in) with December as the wettest month. The temperatures are highest on average in August, at around 25.7 °C (78.3 °F), and lowest in January, at around 1.7 °C (35.1 °F).

Climate data for Akiha-ku, (Note: the weather station located in former Niitsu City) Niigata, elevation 3 m (9.8 ft), (1991−2020 normals, extremes 1978−present)
| Month | Jan | Feb | Mar | Apr | May | Jun | Jul | Aug | Sep | Oct | Nov | Dec | Year |
|---|---|---|---|---|---|---|---|---|---|---|---|---|---|
| Record high °C (°F) | 15.4 (59.7) | 20.6 (69.1) | 23.7 (74.7) | 30.8 (87.4) | 33.4 (92.1) | 36.2 (97.2) | 37.9 (100.2) | 39.2 (102.6) | 36.8 (98.2) | 32.4 (90.3) | 24.9 (76.8) | 17.9 (64.2) | 39.2 (102.6) |
| Mean daily maximum °C (°F) | 4.7 (40.5) | 5.5 (41.9) | 10.0 (50.0) | 16.6 (61.9) | 22.3 (72.1) | 25.7 (78.3) | 29.2 (84.6) | 31.1 (88.0) | 27.0 (80.6) | 20.9 (69.6) | 14.1 (57.4) | 7.8 (46.0) | 17.9 (64.2) |
| Daily mean °C (°F) | 1.7 (35.1) | 1.8 (35.2) | 5.1 (41.2) | 10.8 (51.4) | 16.8 (62.2) | 20.8 (69.4) | 24.4 (75.9) | 25.7 (78.3) | 21.8 (71.2) | 15.7 (60.3) | 9.5 (49.1) | 4.4 (39.9) | 13.2 (55.8) |
| Mean daily minimum °C (°F) | −1.3 (29.7) | −1.8 (28.8) | 0.5 (32.9) | 5.0 (41.0) | 12.1 (53.8) | 16.8 (62.2) | 20.8 (69.4) | 21.7 (71.1) | 17.6 (63.7) | 10.9 (51.6) | 5.1 (41.2) | 1.1 (34.0) | 9.0 (48.3) |
| Record low °C (°F) | −15.1 (4.8) | −12.6 (9.3) | −13.2 (8.2) | −2.6 (27.3) | 2.8 (37.0) | 9.2 (48.6) | 13.5 (56.3) | 13.1 (55.6) | 8.2 (46.8) | 1.0 (33.8) | −3.6 (25.5) | −11.1 (12.0) | −15.1 (4.8) |
| Average precipitation mm (inches) | 189.0 (7.44) | 120.9 (4.76) | 109.9 (4.33) | 95.4 (3.76) | 90.5 (3.56) | 123.8 (4.87) | 225.6 (8.88) | 159.8 (6.29) | 148.1 (5.83) | 151.8 (5.98) | 216.0 (8.50) | 246.3 (9.70) | 1,877.1 (73.90) |
| Average snowfall cm (inches) | 104 (41) | 86 (34) | 22 (8.7) | 0 (0) | 0 (0) | 0 (0) | 0 (0) | 0 (0) | 0 (0) | 0 (0) | trace | 38 (15) | 249 (98) |
| Average extreme snow depth cm (inches) | 31 (12) | 34 (13) | 12 (4.7) | 0 (0) | 0 (0) | 0 (0) | 0 (0) | 0 (0) | 0 (0) | 0 (0) | 0 (0) | 14 (5.5) | 43 (17) |
| Average precipitation days (≥ 1.0 mm) | 22.0 | 17.7 | 16.8 | 12.5 | 10.8 | 10.6 | 13.0 | 10.7 | 12.4 | 14.1 | 18.5 | 22.1 | 181.2 |
| Average snowy days (≥ 3 cm) | 10.2 | 8.8 | 2.6 | 0 | 0 | 0 | 0 | 0 | 0 | 0 | 0.1 | 4.0 | 25.7 |
| Mean monthly sunshine hours | 53.7 | 74.5 | 123.2 | 169.5 | 199.3 | 167.4 | 153.7 | 199.7 | 145.8 | 133.2 | 89.9 | 57.6 | 1,564 |
Source: Japan Meteorological Agency

== History ==
The area of present-day Akiha-ku was part of ancient Echigo Province. The modern towns of Niitsu and Kosudo were established on April 1, 1889 within Nakakanbara District with the establishment of the municipalities system. Niitsu was raised to city status on January 1, 1951. The city of Niigata annexed Niitsu and Kosudo on March 21, 2005. Niigata became a government-designated city on April 1, 2007 and was divided into wards, with the new Akiha Ward consisting of the former city of Niitsu and former town of Kosudo.

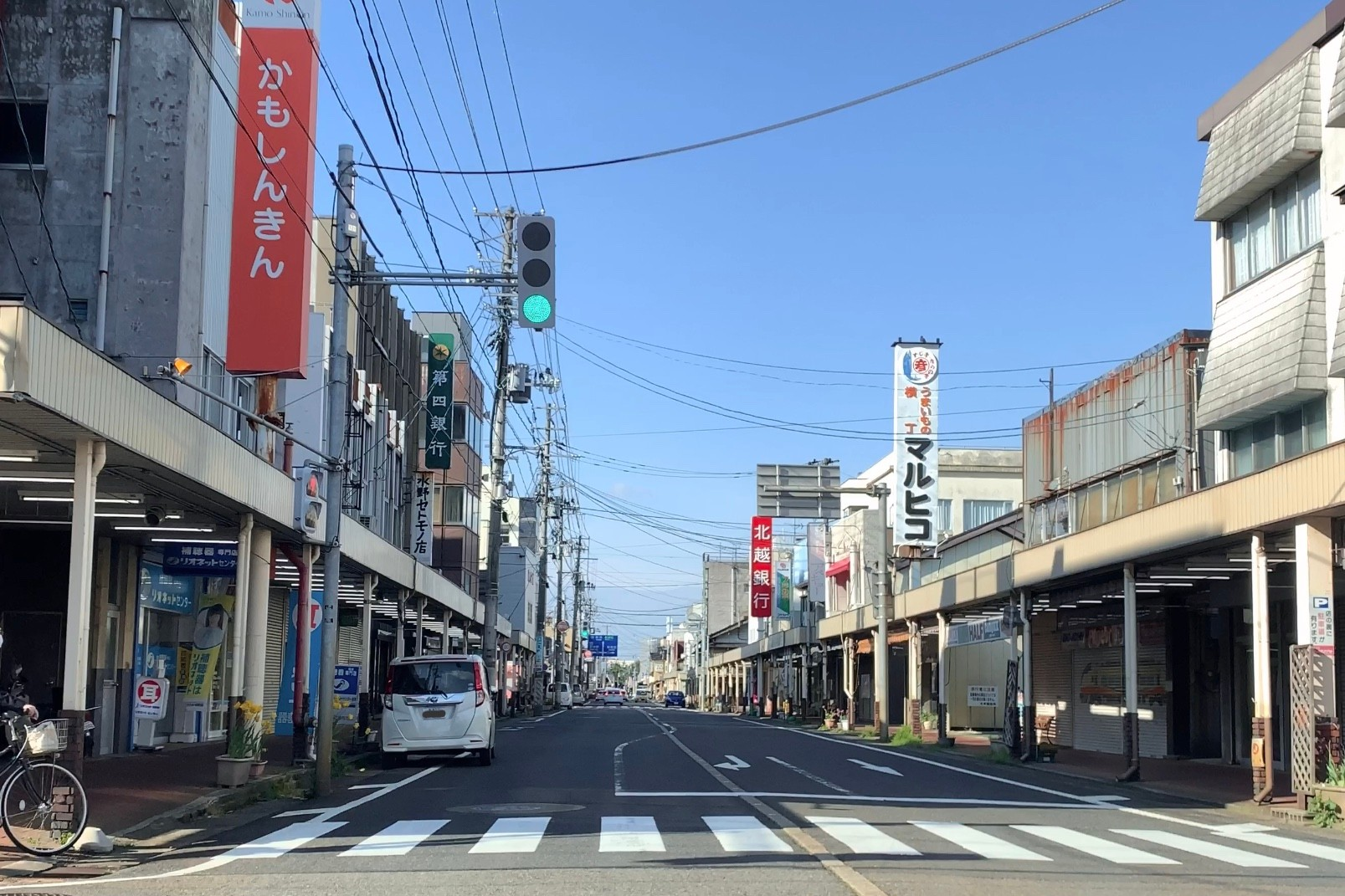
Central Niitsu

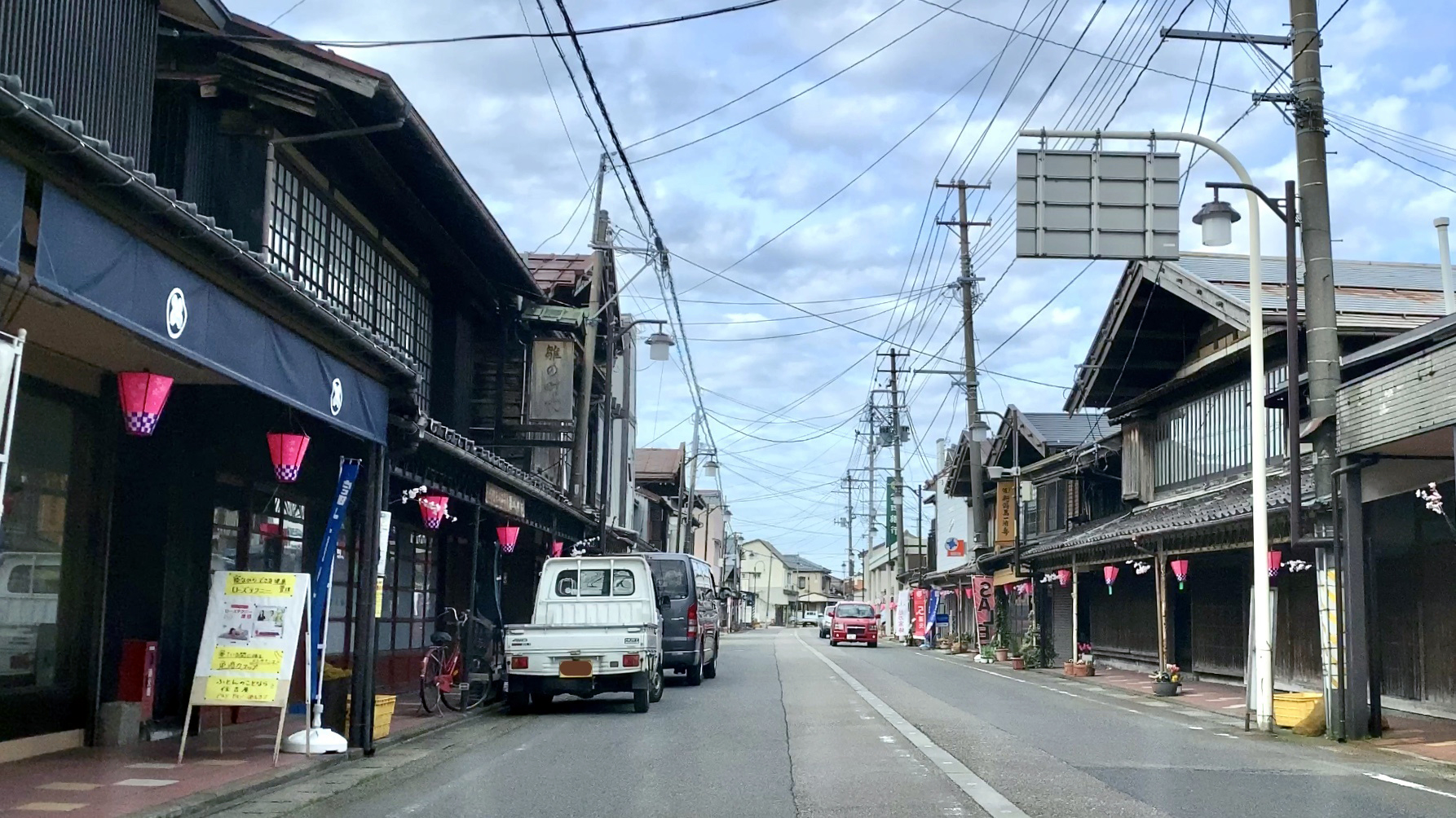
Central Kosudo

== Education ==
=== University ===
- Niigata University of Pharmacy and Applied Life Sciences

=== Primary and secondary education ===
Akiha-ku has 13 public elementary schools and six public middle schools operated by the Niigata city government. The ward has three public high schools operated by the Niigata Prefectural Board of Education.

== Transportation ==
=== Railway ===
JR East - Shin'etsu Main Line

- (Kameda) - Ogikawa - Satsukino - Niitsu - Furutsu - Yashiroda - (Tagami)

JR East - Ban'etsu West Line

- Niitsu - Higashi-Niitsu - Shinseki - (Kita-Gosen)

JR East - Uetsu Main Line

- Niitsu

=== Highways ===
- Ban-etsu Expressway
- National Route 403
- National Route 460

== Points of interest ==
- Niigata Prefectural Botanical Garden
- Niitsu Railway Museum
