= Yashiroda Station =

Railway station in Niigata, Japan

Yashiroda Station 矢代田駅
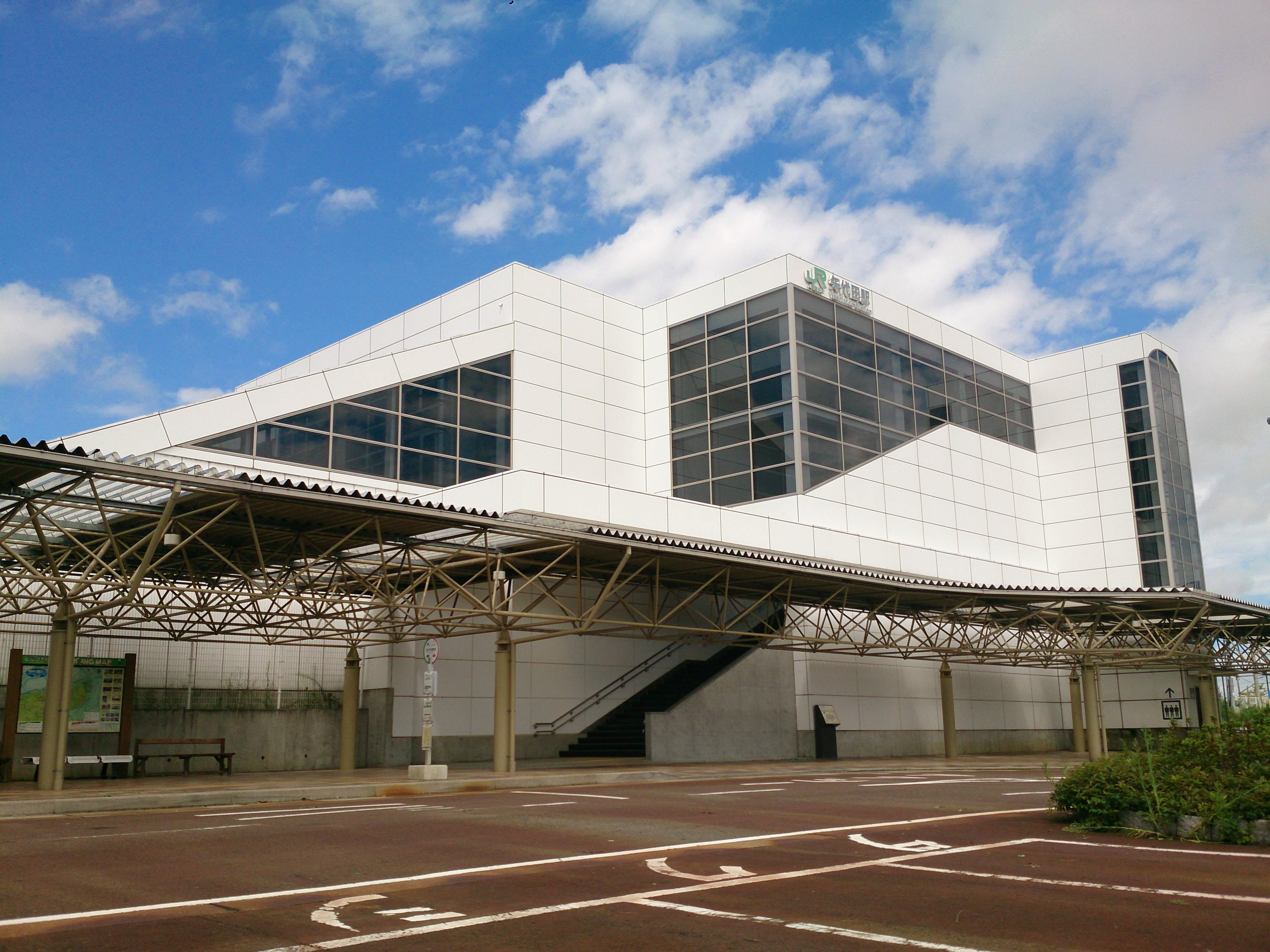
- Yashiroda Station east exit in September 2018

General information
- Location: Yashroda, Akiha-ku, Niigata-shi, Niigata-ken 956-0113; Japan
- Coordinates: 37.7486°N 139.0957°E
- Operator: JR East
- Line: ■ Shin'etsu Main Line
- Distance: 114.8 km from Naoetsu
- Platforms: 2 side platforms
- Tracks: 2

Other information
- Status: Staffed
- Website: Official website

History
- Opened: 20 November 1897; 128 years ago

Passengers
- FY2017: 1,064 daily

Services
Preceding station	JR East	Following station
Kamo towards Naoetsu	Shin'etsu Main Line Rapid	Niitsu towards Niigata
Tagami towards Naoetsu	Shin'etsu Main Line Local	Furutsu towards Niigata
Location
- Location within JR Shinetsu Main Line Location within Japan

Yashiroda Station (矢代田駅, Yashiroda-eki) is a train station in Akiha-ku, Niigata, Niigata Prefecture, Japan, operated by East Japan Railway Company (JR East).

== Lines ==
Yashiroda Station is served by the Shin'etsu Main Line, and is 114.8 kilometers from the starting point of the line at Naoetsu Station.

== Layout ==
The station consists of two ground-level side platforms, serving two tracks, with the station situated above the tracks.

=== Platforms ===
1	■ Shin'etsu Main Line	for Hanyūda, Nagaoka
2	■ Shin'etsu Main Line	for Niitsu, Niigata

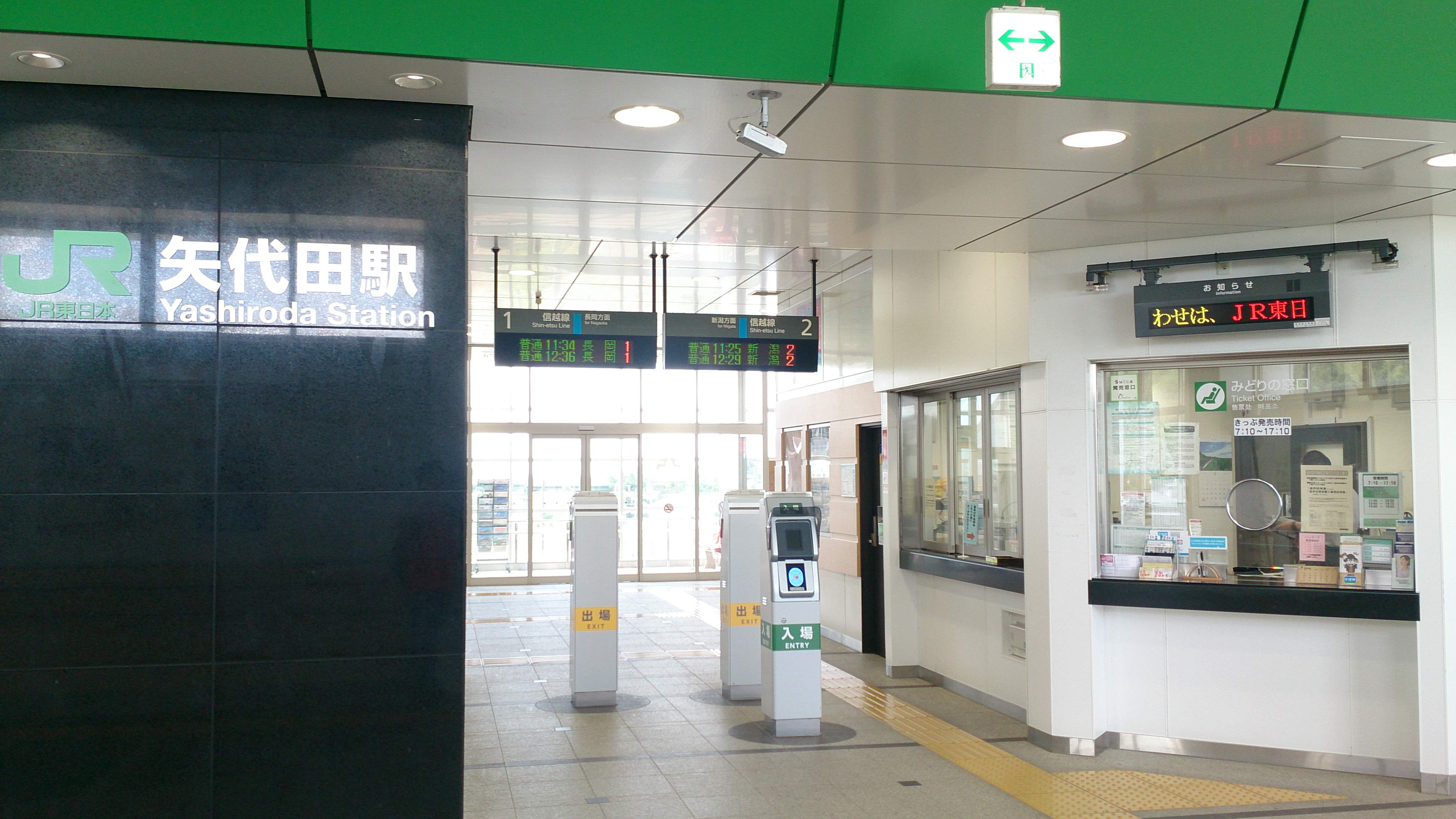
Ticket gates in September 2018

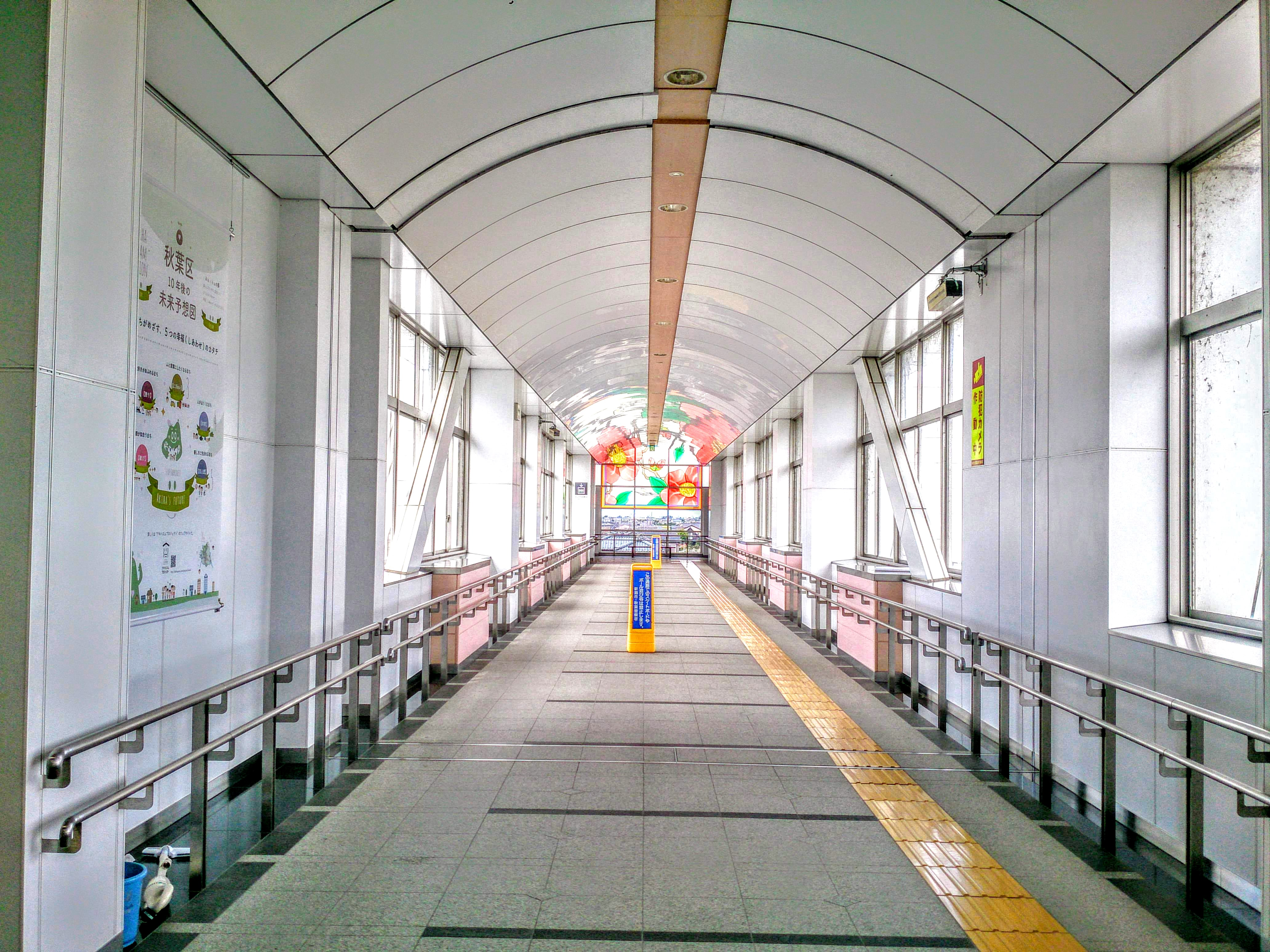
Station passageway

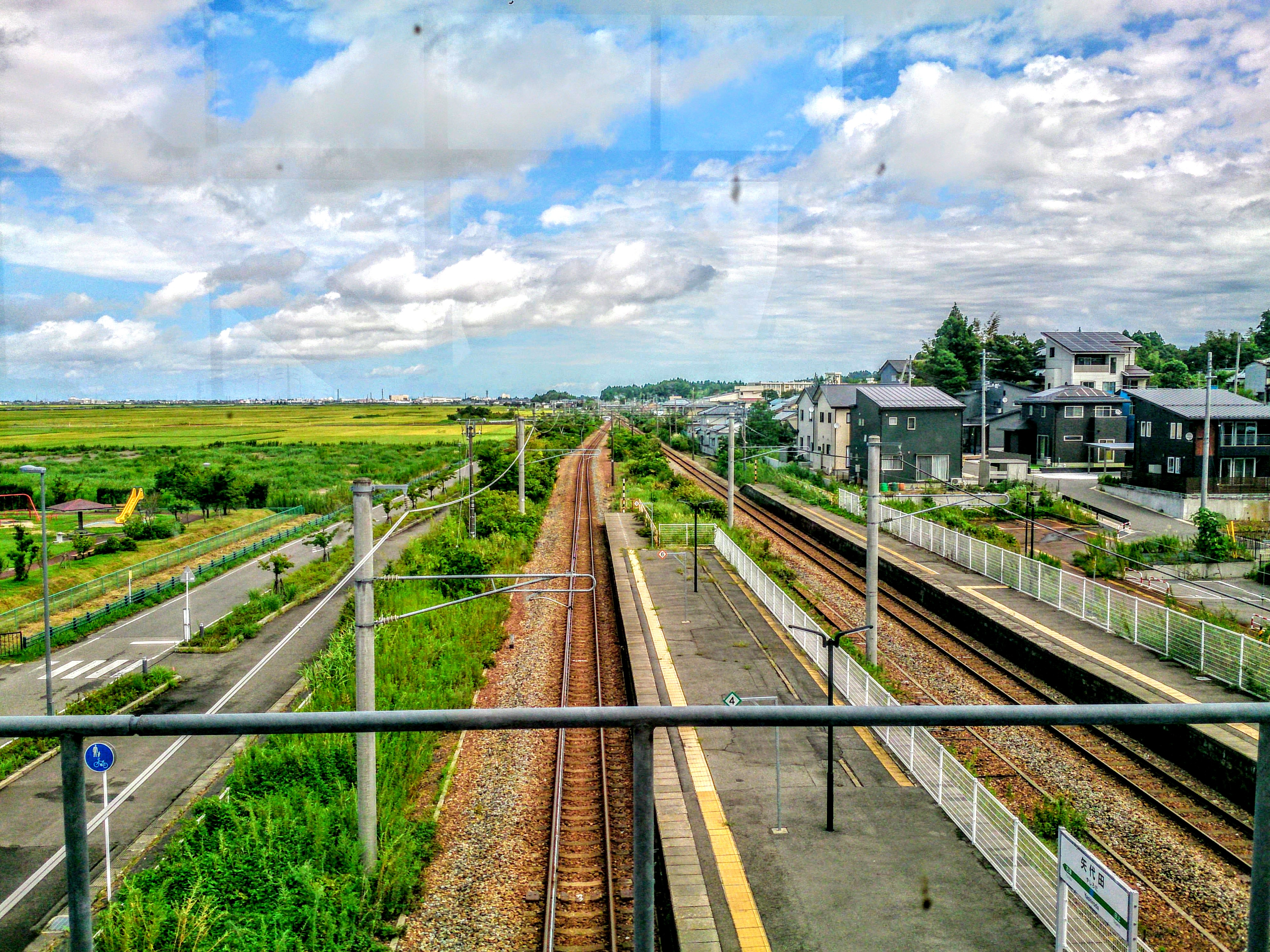
The platforms in September 2018

== History ==
The station opened on 20 November 1897. With the privatization of Japanese National Railways (JNR) on 1 April 1987, the station came under the control of JR East. A new station building was completed in 2008.

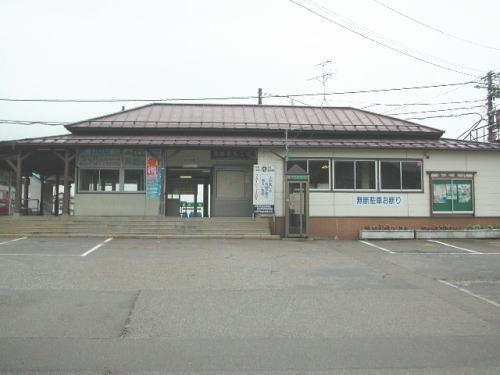
The station building in July 2004

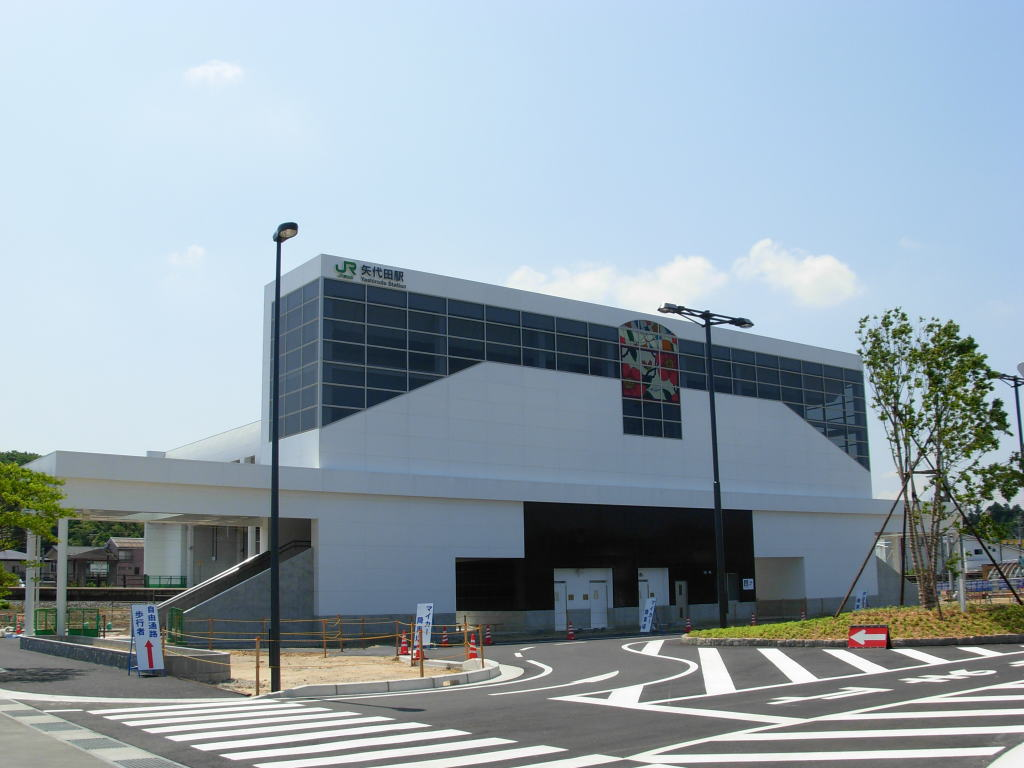
New station building in August 2008

== Passenger statistics ==
In fiscal 2017, the station was used by an average of 1,064 passengers daily (boarding passengers only).

== Surrounding area ==
- Niitsu Minami High School
- National Route 403
- Kosudo district

== See also ==
- List of railway stations in Japan
