= Honai Station =

Railway station in Sanjō, Niigata Prefecture, Japan

Honai Station 保内駅
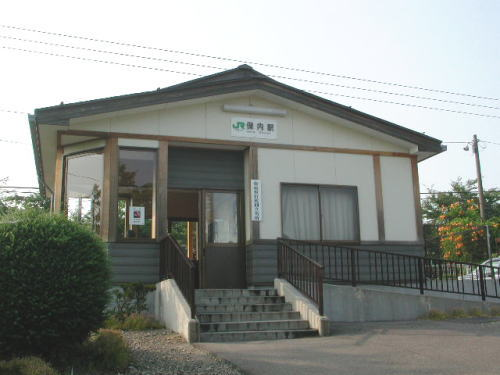
- Honai Station, July 2007

General information
- Location: Kamihonai, Sanjō-shi, Niigata-ken 955-0022; Japan
- Coordinates: 37.6395°N 139.0144°E
- Operator: JR East
- Line: ■ Shin'etsu Main Line
- Distance: 100.0 km from Naoetsu
- Platforms: 2 side platforms
- Tracks: 2

Other information
- Status: Unstaffed
- Website: Official website

History
- Opened: 1 August 1949; 77 years ago

Services
Preceding station	JR East	Following station
Higashi-Sanjō towards Naoetsu	Shin'etsu Main Line Local	Kamo towards Niigata
Location
- Location within JR Shinetsu Main Line Location within Japan

Honai Station (保内駅, Honai-eki) is a railway station in the city of Sanjō, Niigata, Japan, operated by East Japan Railway Company (JR East).

== Lines ==
Honai Station is served by the Shin'etsu Main Line and is 100.0 km from the terminus of the line at Naoetsu Station.

== Station layout ==
The station consists of two ground-level opposed side platforms connected by a footbridge, serving two tracks. The station is unstaffed.

=== Platforms ===
1	■ Shin'etsu Main Line	for Kashiwazaki and Nagaoka
2	■ Shin'etsu Main Line	for Niitsu and Niigata

== History ==
Honai Station opened on 1 August 1949. With the privatization of Japanese National Railways (JNR) on 1 April 1987, the station came under the control of JR East.

== Surrounding area ==
- National Route 403

== See also ==
- List of railway stations in Japan
