= Kamo Station (Niigata) =

Railway station in Kamo, Niigata Prefecture, Japan

Kamo Station 加茂駅
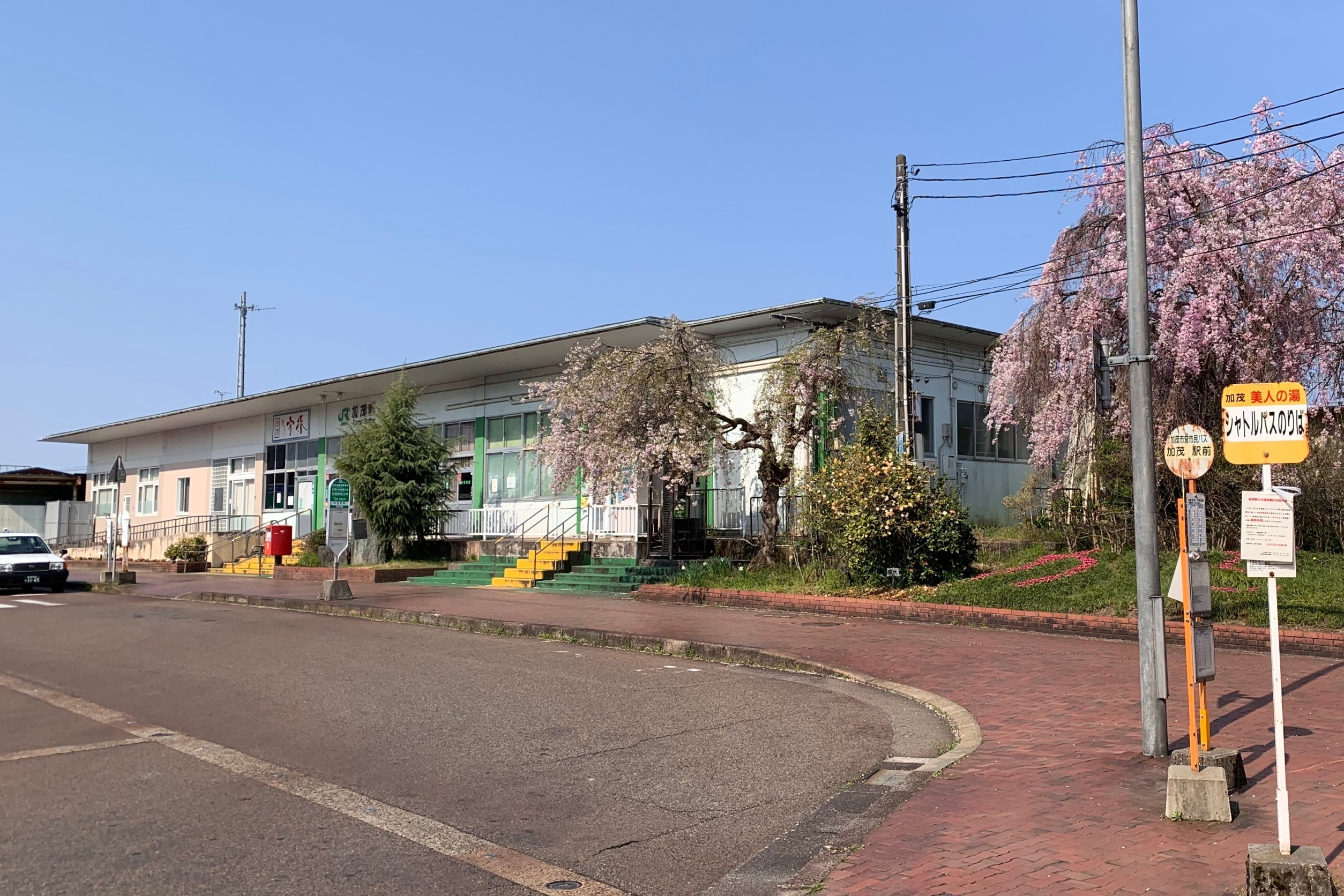
- East side of the station (April 2020)

General information
- Location: 1-1 Kamoeki-mae, Kamo-shi, Niigata-ken 959-1384; Japan
- Coordinates: 37.6589°N 139.049°E
- Operator: JR East
- Line: ■ Shin'etsu Main Line
- Platforms: 2 side platforms
- Tracks: 2

Other information
- Status: Staffed (Midori no Madoguchi )
- Website: Official website

History
- Opened: 20 November 1897; 128 years ago

Passengers
- 2,837 (FY2017)

Services
Preceding station	JR East	Following station
Higashi-Sanjō towards Naoetsu	Shirayuki	Niitsu towards Niigata
Higashi-Sanjō towards Naoetsu	Shin'etsu Main Line Rapid	Yashiroda towards Niigata
Honai towards Naoetsu	Shin'etsu Main Line Local	Hanyūda towards Niigata
Location
- Location within JR Shinetsu Main Line Location within Japan

Kamo Station (加茂駅, Kamo-eki) is a railway station in the city of Kamo, Niigata, Japan, operated by East Japan Railway Company (JR East).

== Lines ==
Kamo Station is served by the Shin'etsu Main Line and is 103.8 kilometers from the terminus of the line at Naoetsu Station.

== Station layout ==
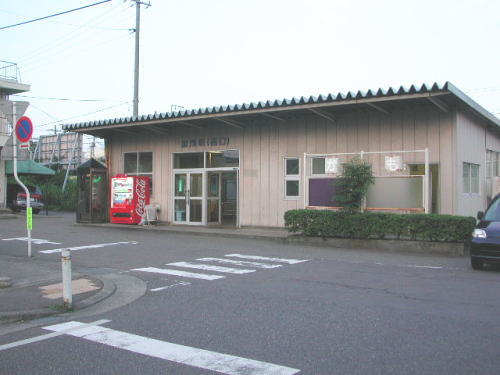
West side of the station (July 2004)

The station consists of two ground-level opposed side platforms connected by an underground passageway, serving two tracks. The station has a Midori no Madoguchi staffed ticket office.

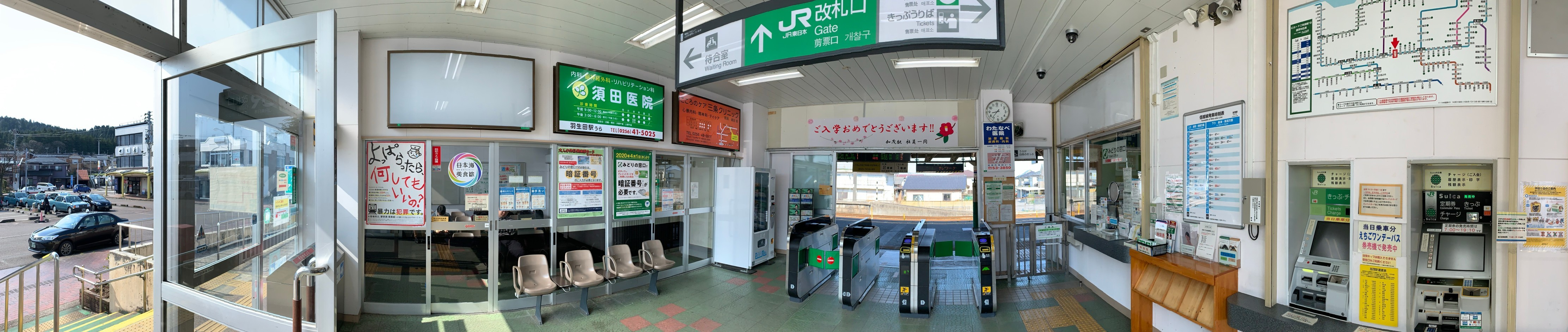
Station interior (April 2020)

=== Platforms ===
1	■ Shin'etsu Main Line	for Nagaoka, Kashiwazaki, Naoetsu
2	■ Shin'etsu Main Line	for Niitsu, Niigata

== History ==
Kamo Station opened on 20 November 1897. The privately owned Kanbara Railway Company operated a line from Kamo to Gosen from 1930 to 1985. With the privatization of Japanese National Railways (JNR) on 1 April 1987, the station came under the control of JR East.

== Passenger statistics ==
In fiscal 2017, the station was used by an average of 2837 passengers daily (boarding passengers only).

== Surrounding area ==
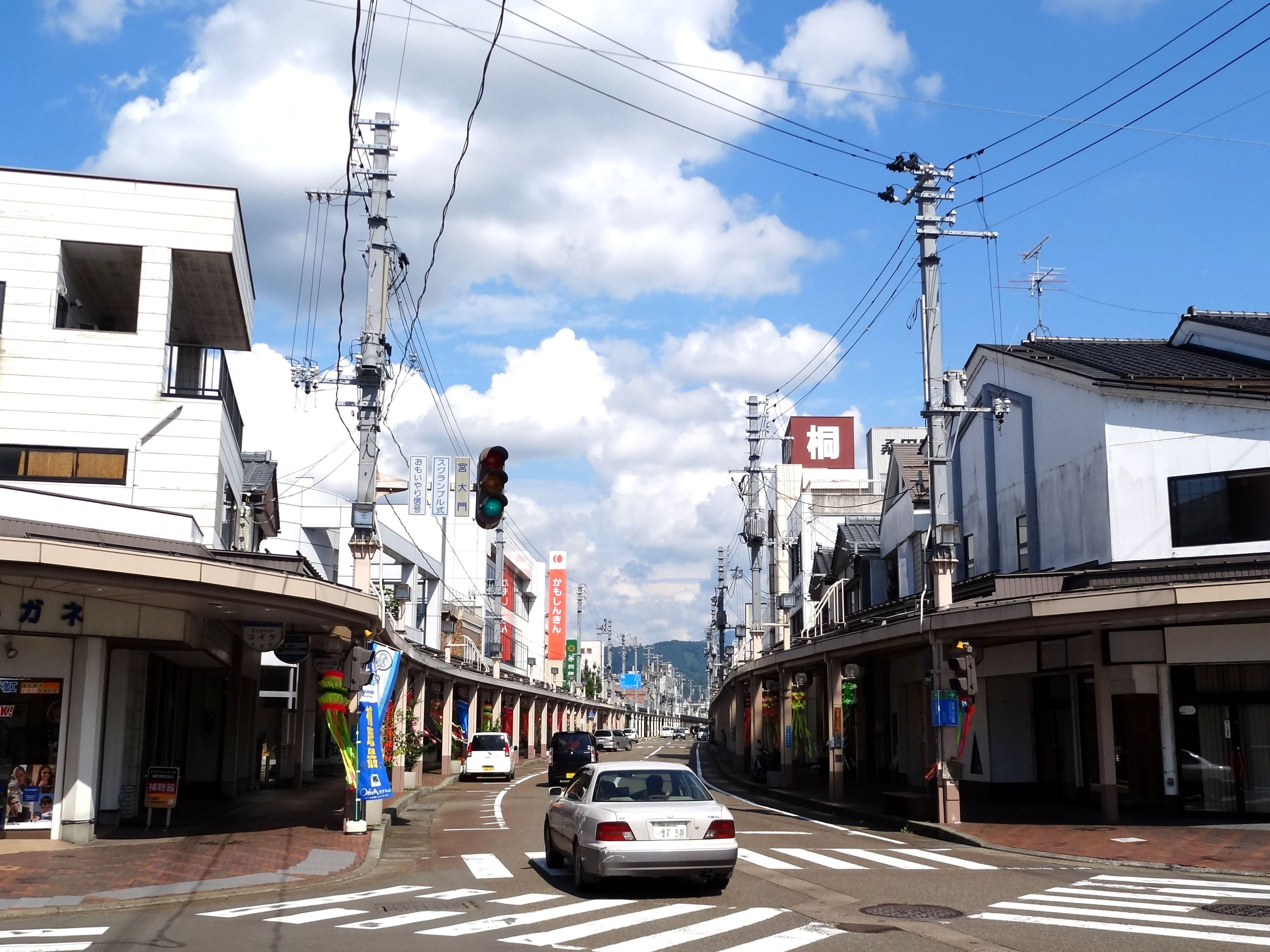
Shopping street of Kamo

- Kamo City Hall
- Kamo Post Office
- National Route 403

== See also ==
- List of railway stations in Japan
