= Tagami Station =

Tagami Station is the name of two train stations in Japan:

- Tagami Station (Gifu) (田神駅)
- Tagami Station (Niigata) (田上駅)
