= Akiha =

Akiha may refer to:

- Mount Akiha, mountain in Shizuoka Prefecture, Japan
- Akiha-ku, Niigata, ward of Niigata City, Niigata Prefecture, Japan
