= Higashi-Niitsu Station =

Railway station in Niigata, Japan

Coordinates: 37.7878°N 139.1439°E

Higashi-Niitsu Station 東新津駅
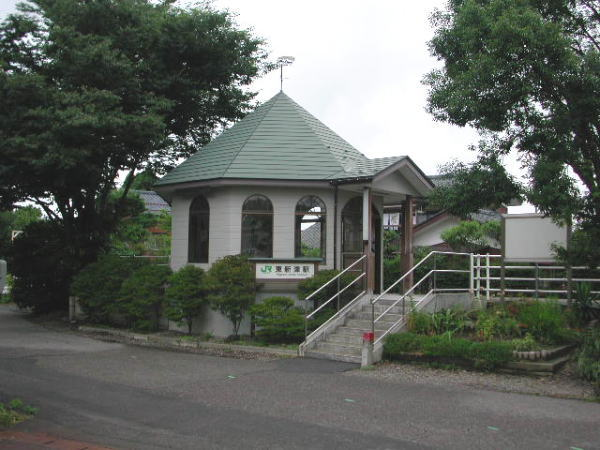
- Higashi-Niitsu Station, July 2004

General information
- Location: Takiya-cho, Akiha-ku, Niigata-shi, Niigata-ken 956-0854; Japan
- Operator: JR East
- Line: ■ Ban'etsu West Line
- Platforms: 1 side platform

Other information
- Website: www.jreast.co.jp/estation/station/info.aspx?StationCd=1298

History
- Opened: 20 February 1952

Services
Preceding station	JR East	Following station
Niitsu Terminus	Ban'etsu West Line Local	Shinseki towards Kōriyama
Location
- Location within Japan

Higashi-Niitsu Station (東新津駅, Higashi-Niitsu-eki) is a railway station in Akiha-ku, Niigata, Niigata Prefecture, Japan, operated by East Japan Railway Company (JR East).

== Lines ==
Higashi-Niitsu Station is served by the Ban'etsu West Line, and is 172.8 kilometers from the terminus of the line at Kōriyama.

== Station layout ==
The station consists of one ground-level side platform serving a single bi-directional track. The station building by consists only of a small waiting room. The station is unattended.

== History ==
The station opened on 20 February 1952. With the privatization of Japanese National Railways (JNR) on 1 April 1987, the station came under the control of JR East. The current station building dates from January 2001.

== Surrounding area ==
- Niitsu-Takiya Post Office
- Niitsu High School
