= Kosudo, Niigata =

Kosudo 小須戸町
- Former municipality
- Flag Emblem

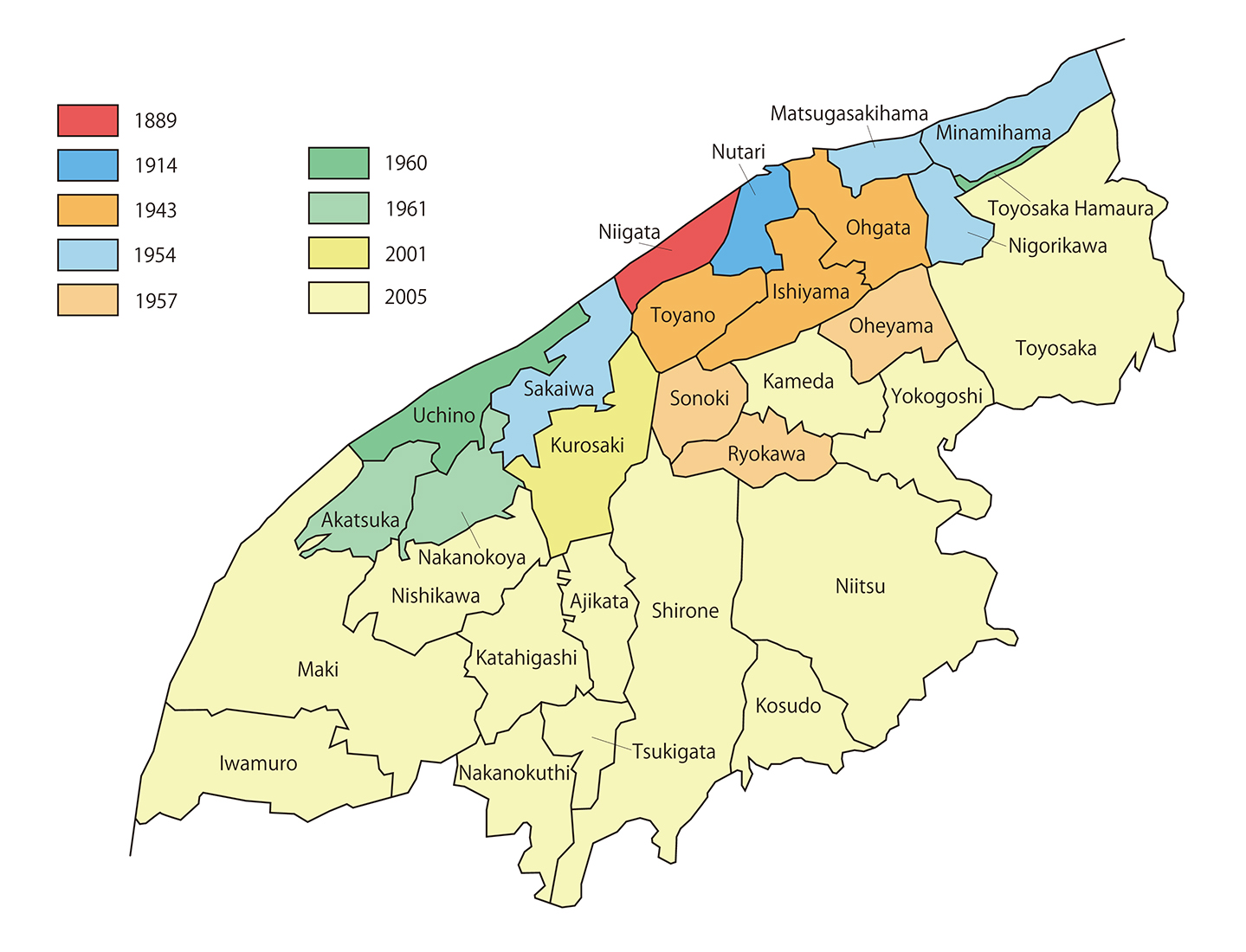
- Location of Kosudo in Niigata Prefecture
- Country: Japan
- Region: Hokuriku
- Prefecture: Niigata Prefecture
- District: Nakakanbara District
- Merged: March 21, 2005 (now part of Niigata)

Area
  - Total: 16.91 km^{2} (6.53 sq mi)

Population (2005)
  - Total: 10,187
- Time zone: UTC+09:00 (JST)
- Symbols
- Flower: Rhododendron

Kosudo (小須戸町, Kosudo-machi) was a town located in Nakakanbara District, Niigata Prefecture, Japan.

As of 2003, the town had an estimated population of 10,256 and a density of 606.5 persons per km^{2}. The total area was 16.91 km^{2}.

On March 21, 2005, Kosudo, along with the cities of Niitsu, Shirone and Toyosaka, the towns of Kameda and Yokogoshi (all from Nakakanbara District), the town of Nishikawa, and the villages of Ajikata, Iwamuro, Katahigashi, Nakanokuchi and Tsukigata (all from Nishikanbara District), was merged into the expanded city of Niigata. As of April 1, 2007, the area is part of the Akiha-ku ward.
