= Satsukino Station =

Railway station in Niigata, Japan

Satsukino Station さつき野駅
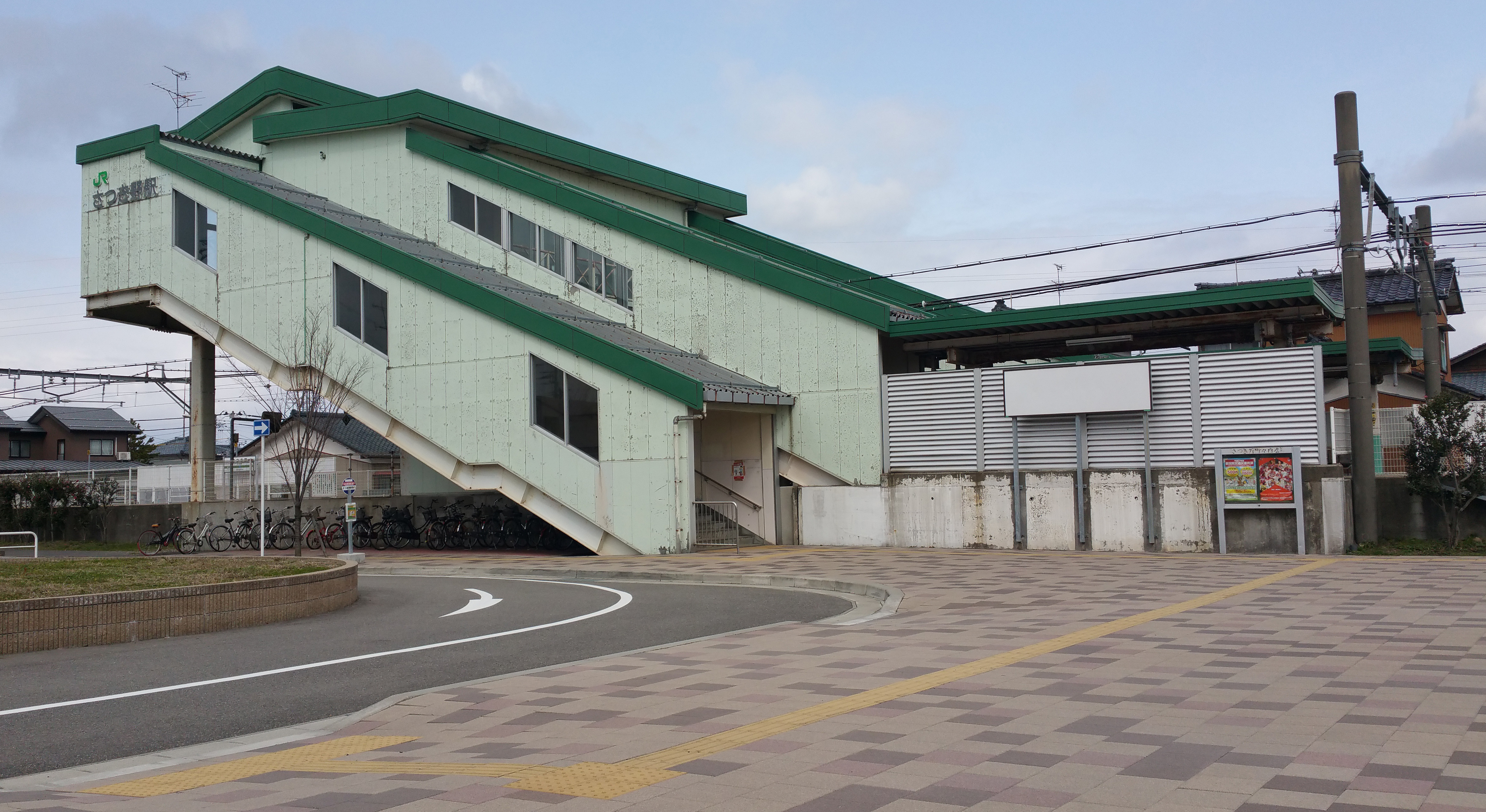
- West side of Satsukino Station, February 2015

General information
- Location: 1 Satsukino, Akiha-ku, Niigata-shi, Niigata-ken 956-0022; Japan
- Coordinates: 37.8129°N 139.1176°E
- Operator: JR East
- Line: ■ Shin'etsu Main Line
- Distance: 122.6 km from Naoetsu
- Platforms: 2 side platforms
- Tracks: 2

Other information
- Status: Staffed
- Website: Official website

History
- Opened: 16 March 1991; 35 years ago

Passengers
- FY2017: 987 daily

Services
Preceding station	JR East	Following station
Niitsu towards Naoetsu	Shin'etsu Main Line Local	Ogikawa towards Niigata
Location
- Location within JR Shinetsu Main Line Location within Japan

Satsukino Station (さつき野駅, Satsukino-eki) is a train station in Akiha-ku, Niigata, Niigata Prefecture, Japan.

== Lines ==
Satsukino Station is served by the Shin'etsu Main Line, and is 122.6 kilometers from the terminus of the line at Naoetsu.

== Layout ==
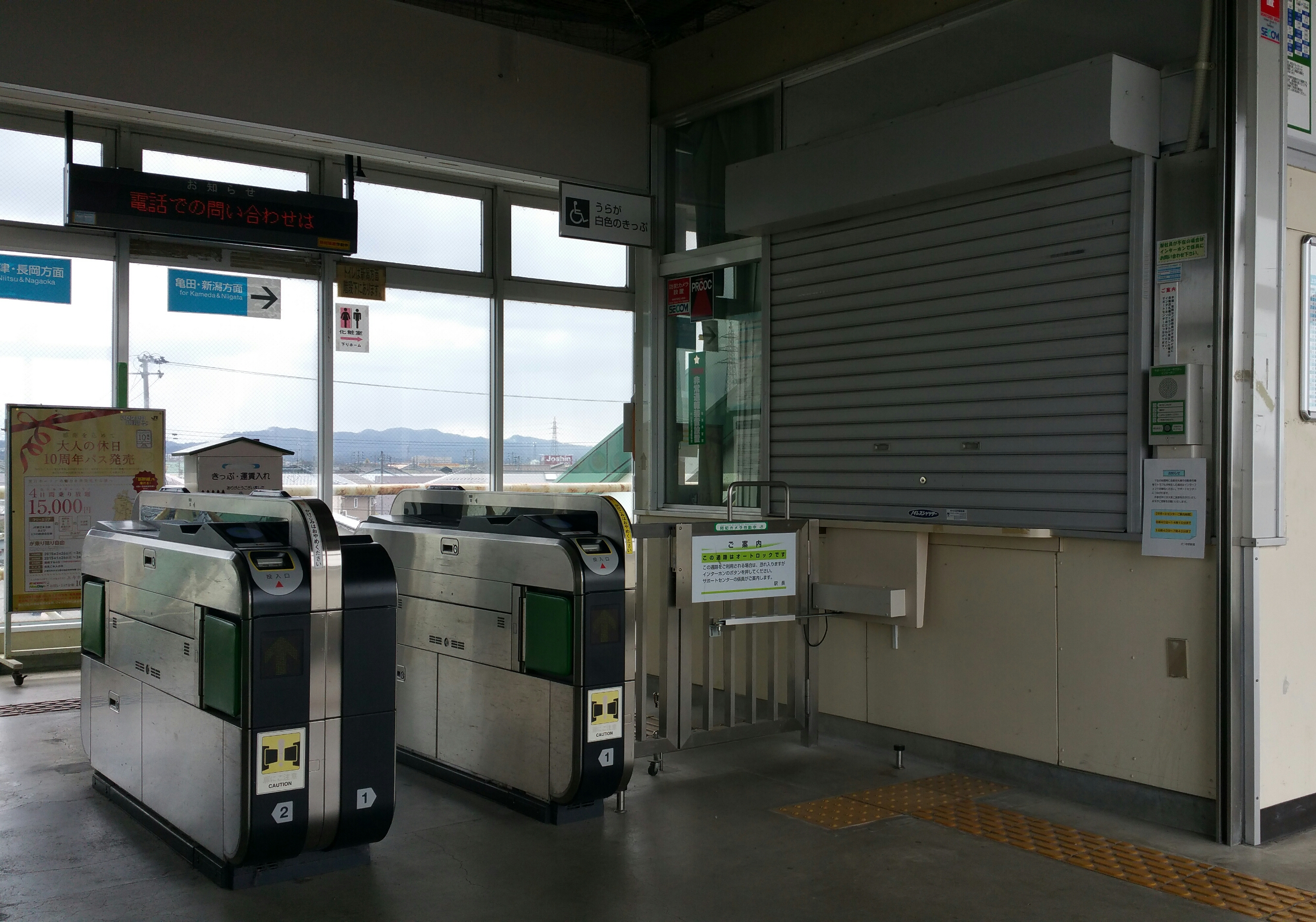
Gate

The station consists of two ground-level opposed side platforms serving two tracks, with the station situated above the tracks.

=== Platforms ===
1	■ Shin'etsu Main Line	for Niigata
2	■ Shin'etsu Main Line	for Niitsu, Nagaoka

== History ==
The station opened on 16 March 1991.

== Passenger statistics ==
In fiscal 2017, the station was used by an average of 987 passengers daily (boarding passengers only).
