= Shinseki Station =

Railway station in Niigata, Japan

Shinseki Station 新関駅
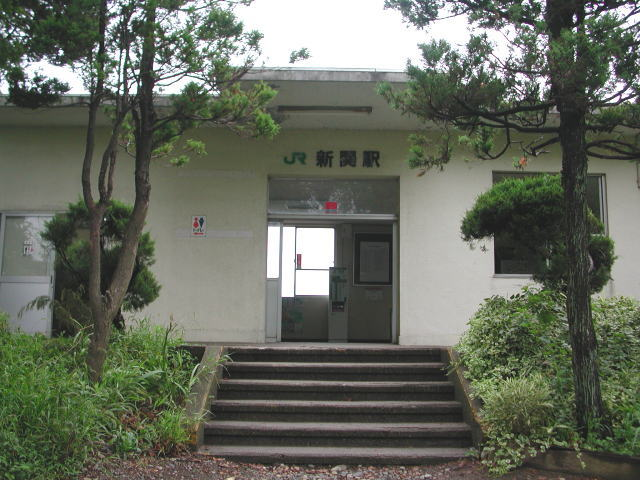
- Shinseki Station, September 2004

General information
- Location: Oseki, Akiha-ku, Niigata-shi, Niigata-ken 956-0827; Japan
- Coordinates: 37.7683°N 139.1624°E
- Operator: JR East
- Line: ■ Ban'etsu West Line
- Platforms: 2 side platforms

Other information
- Website: www.jreast.co.jp/estation/station/info.aspx?StationCd=871

History
- Opened: 15 April 1954

Services
Preceding station	JR East	Following station
Higashi-Niitsu towards Niitsu	Ban'etsu West Line Local	Kita-Gosen towards Kōriyama
Location
- Location within Japan

Shinseki Station (新関駅, Shinseki-eki) is a railway station in Akiha-ku, Niigata, Niigata Prefecture, Japan, operated by East Japan Railway Company (JR East).

== Lines ==
Shinseki Station is served by the Ban'etsu West Line, and is 170.0 kilometers from the terminus of the line at Kōriyama.

== Station layout ==
The station consists of two ground-level opposed side platforms serving two tracks, connected to the station building by a footbridge. The station is unattended.

=== Platforms ===
1	■ Ban'etsu West Line	for Niitsu and Niigata for Maoroshi, Tsugawa and Aizu-Wakamatsu
2	■ Ban'etsu West Line	for Maoroshi, Tsugawa Aizu-Wakamatsu

== History ==
The station opened on 14 April 1954. With the privatization of Japanese National Railways (JNR) on 1 April 1987, the station came under the control of JR East.

== Surrounding area ==
The station is located in a rural area surrounded by rice fields with scattered residences.
