= Ogikawa Station =

Railway station in Niigata, Japan

Ogikawa Station 荻川駅
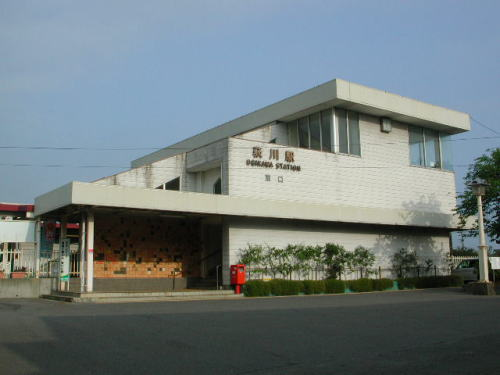
- Ogikawa Station, East side, August 2004

General information
- Location: 3 Nakano, Akiha-ku, Niigata-shi, Niigata-ken 956-0805; Japan
- Coordinates: 37.8335°N 139.1114°E
- Operator: JR East
- Line: ■ Shin'etsu Main Line
- Distance: 124.9 km from Naoetsu
- Platforms: 2 side platforms
- Tracks: 2

Other information
- Status: Staffed
- Website: Official website

History
- Opened: 20 November 1926; 99 years ago

Passengers
- FY2017: 1,912 daily

Services
Preceding station	JR East	Following station
Satsukino towards Naoetsu	Shin'etsu Main Line Local	Kameda towards Niigata
Location
- Location within JR Shinetsu Main Line Location within Niigata city Location within Niigata Prefecture Location within Japan

Ogikawa Station (荻川駅, Ogikawa-eki) is a train station in Akiha-ku, Niigata, Niigata Prefecture, Japan.

== Lines ==
Ogikawa Station is served by the Shin'etsu Main Line, and is located 124.9 kilometers from the terminus of the line at Naoetsu.

== Layout ==
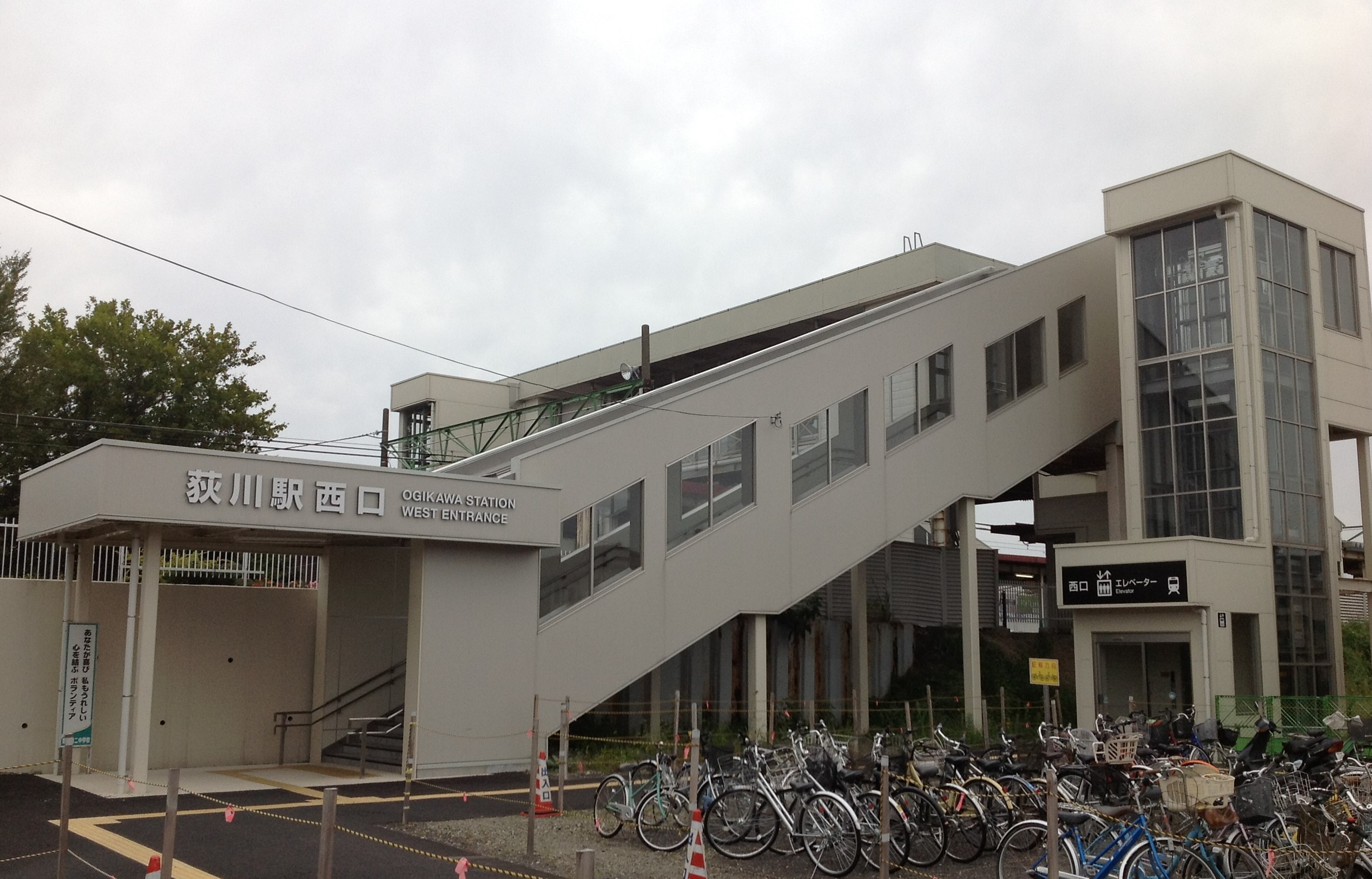
Ogikawa Station, West side (September 2015)

The station consists of two ground-level opposed side platforms serving two tracks, with the station situated above the tracks.

=== Platforms ===
1	■ Shin'etsu Main Line	for Niitsu, Nagaoka
2	■ Shin'etsu Main Line	for Niigata

== History ==
The station opened on 20 November 1926. The current station building was completed in December 1986. With the privatization of Japanese National Railways (JNR) on 1 April 1987, the station came under the control of JR East.

== Surrounding area ==
- Ogikawa Post Office
- Ogikawa Elementary School

== Passenger statistics ==
In fiscal 2017, the station was used by an average of 1912 passengers daily (boarding passengers only).

== See also ==
- List of railway stations in Japan
