= Hanyūda Station =

Railway station in Tagami, Niigata Prefecture, Japan

Coordinates: 37.6938°N 139.0606°E

Hanyūda Station 羽生田駅
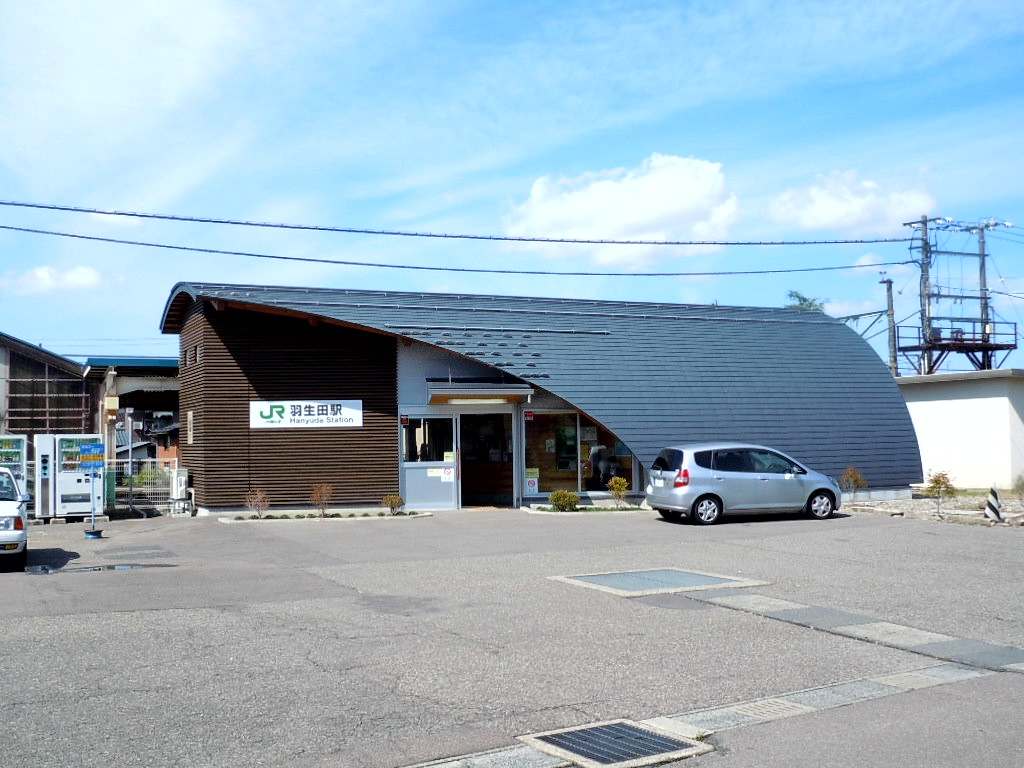
- Hanyūda Station in September 2010

General information
- Location: Hanyūda, Tagami-machi, Minamikanbara-gun, Niigata-ken 959-1512; Japan
- Operator: JR East
- Line: ■ Shinetsu Main Line
- Distance: 107.9 km from Naoetsu
- Platforms: 1 side + 1 island platform
- Tracks: 3

Other information
- Status: Unstaffed
- Website: Official website

History
- Opened: 19 April 1903; 123 years ago

Passengers
- FY2015: 570 daily

Services
Preceding station	JR East	Following station
Kamo towards Naoetsu	Shin'etsu Main Line Local	Tagami towards Niigata
Location
- Location within JR Shinetsu Main Line Location within Japan

Hanyūda Station (羽生田駅, Hanyūda-eki) is a railway station on the Shinetsu Main Line in Tagami, Niigata, Japan, operated by East Japan Railway Company (JR East).

== Lines ==
Hanyūda Station is served by the Shinetsu Main Line.

== Layout ==
The station consists of one side platform and one island platform connected to the station building by a footbridge.

=== Platforms ===
1	■ Shinetsu Main Line	for Nagaoka
2	■ Shinetsu Main Line	for Nagaoka and Niigata (bidirectional)
3	■ Shinetsu Main Line	for Niitsu and Niigata

== History ==
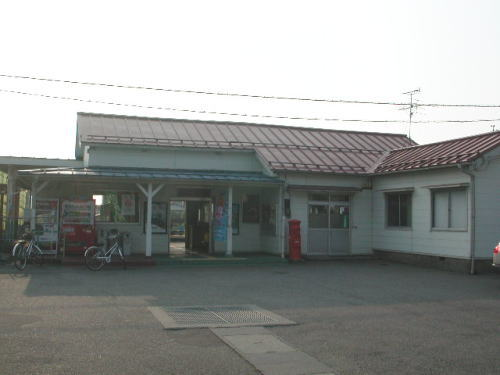
Former station building (July 2004)

The station opened on 19 April 1903.

== Passenger statistics ==
In fiscal 2015, the station was used by an average of 570 passengers daily (boarding passengers only).

== Surrounding area ==
- Tagami town hall
- National Route 403

== See also ==
- List of railway stations in Japan
