= Tagami Station (Niigata) =

Railway station in Tagami, Niigata Prefecture, Japan

Tagami Station 田上駅
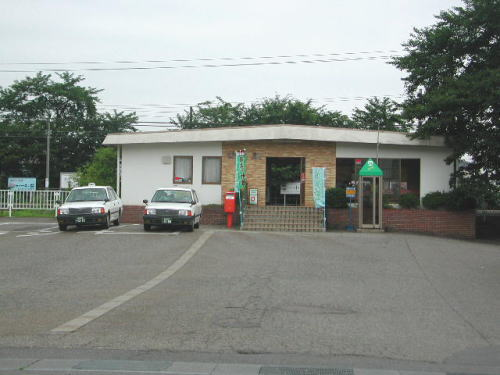
- Station building (July 2004)

General information
- Location: Tagami, Tagami-machi, Minamikambara-gun, Niigata-ken 959-1502; Japan
- Coordinates: 37.7189°N 139.0745°E
- Operator: JR East
- Line: ■ Shinetsu Main Line
- Distance: 111.1 km from Naoetsu
- Platforms: 2 side platforms
- Tracks: 2

Other information
- Status: Unstaffed
- Website: Official website

History
- Opened: 28 May 1949; 77 years ago

Services
Preceding station	JR East	Following station
Hanyūda towards Naoetsu	Shin'etsu Main Line Local	Yashiroda towards Niigata
Location
- Location within JR Shinetsu Main Line Location within Japan

Tagami Station (田上駅, Tagami-eki) is a railway station on the Shinetsu Main Line in the town of Tagami, Niigata, Japan, operated by East Japan Railway Company (JR East).

== Lines ==
Tagami Station is served by the Shinetsu Main Line and is 111.1 kilometers from the terminus of the line at Naoetsu Station.

== Station layout ==
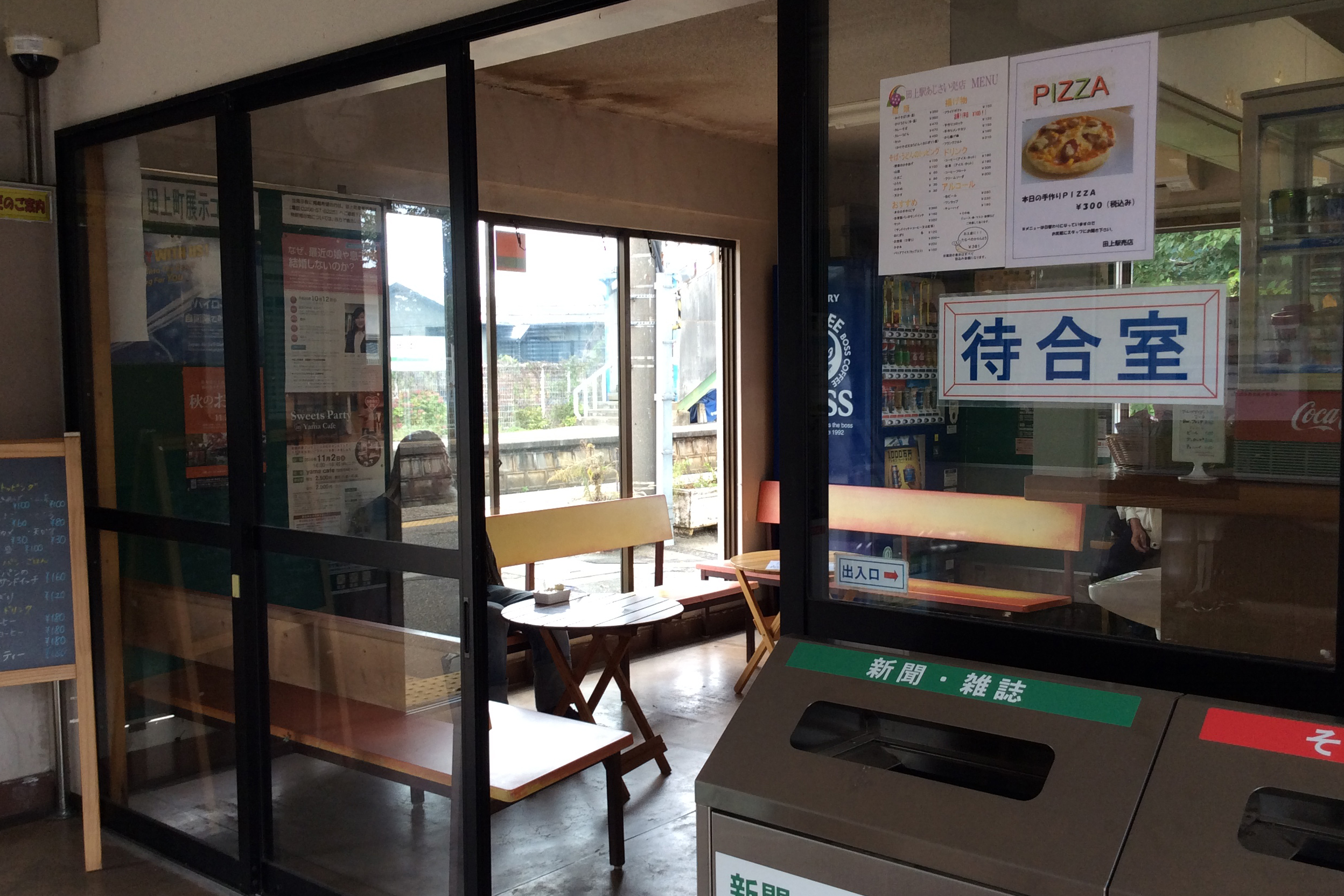
Tagami Station waiting room in October 2014

The station consists of two ground-level opposed side platforms connected by a footbridge, serving two tracks. The station is unattended.

=== Platforms ===
1	■ Shinetsu Main Line	for Higashi-Sanjō and Nagaoka
2	■ Shinetsu Main Line	for Naoetsu and Niigata

== History ==
Tagami Station opened on 28 May 1949. With the privatization of Japanese National Railways (JNR) on 1 April 1987, the station came under the control of JR East.

== Surrounding area ==
- National Route 403
- Yutagami Onsen

== See also ==
- List of railway stations in Japan
