= Kita-Gosen Station =

Railway station in Gosen, Niigata Prefecture, Japan

Kita-Gosen Station 北五泉駅
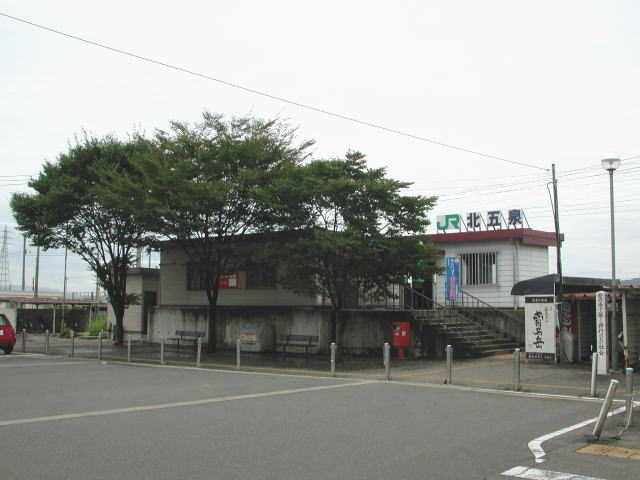
- Kita-Gosen Station, September 2004

General information
- Location: 993-3 Kita-Gosen eki mae, Gosen-shi, Niigata-ken 959-1851; Japan
- Coordinates: 37.7469°N 139.1697°E
- Operator: JR East
- Line: ■ Ban'etsu West Line
- Distance: 167.5 km from Kōriyama
- Platforms: 1 side platform

History
- Opened: 20 February 1952

Passengers
- FY2017: 740 daily

Services
Preceding station	JR East	Following station
Shinseki towards Niitsu	Ban'etsu West Line Local	Gosen towards Kōriyama
Location
- Location within Japan

Kita-Gosen Station (北五泉駅, Kita-Gosen-eki) is a railway station in the city of Gosen, Niigata Prefecture, Japan, operated by East Japan Railway Company (JR East).

== Lines ==
Kita-Gosen Station is served by the Ban'etsu West Line, and is 167.5 kilometers from the terminus of the line at Kōriyama.

== Station layout ==
The station consists of one ground-level side platform serving a single bi-directional track. The station is attended.

== History ==
The station opened on 20 February 1952. With the privatization of Japanese National Railways (JNR) on 1 April 1987, the station came under the control of JR East.

== Passenger statistics ==
In fiscal 2017, the station was used by an average of 740 passengers daily (boarding passengers only).

== Surrounding area ==
- Gosen High School
