= Niigata University of Pharmacy and Applied Life Sciences =

Private university in Niigata, Niigata, Japan

Coordinates: 37°46′29.7″N 139°7′19.7″E

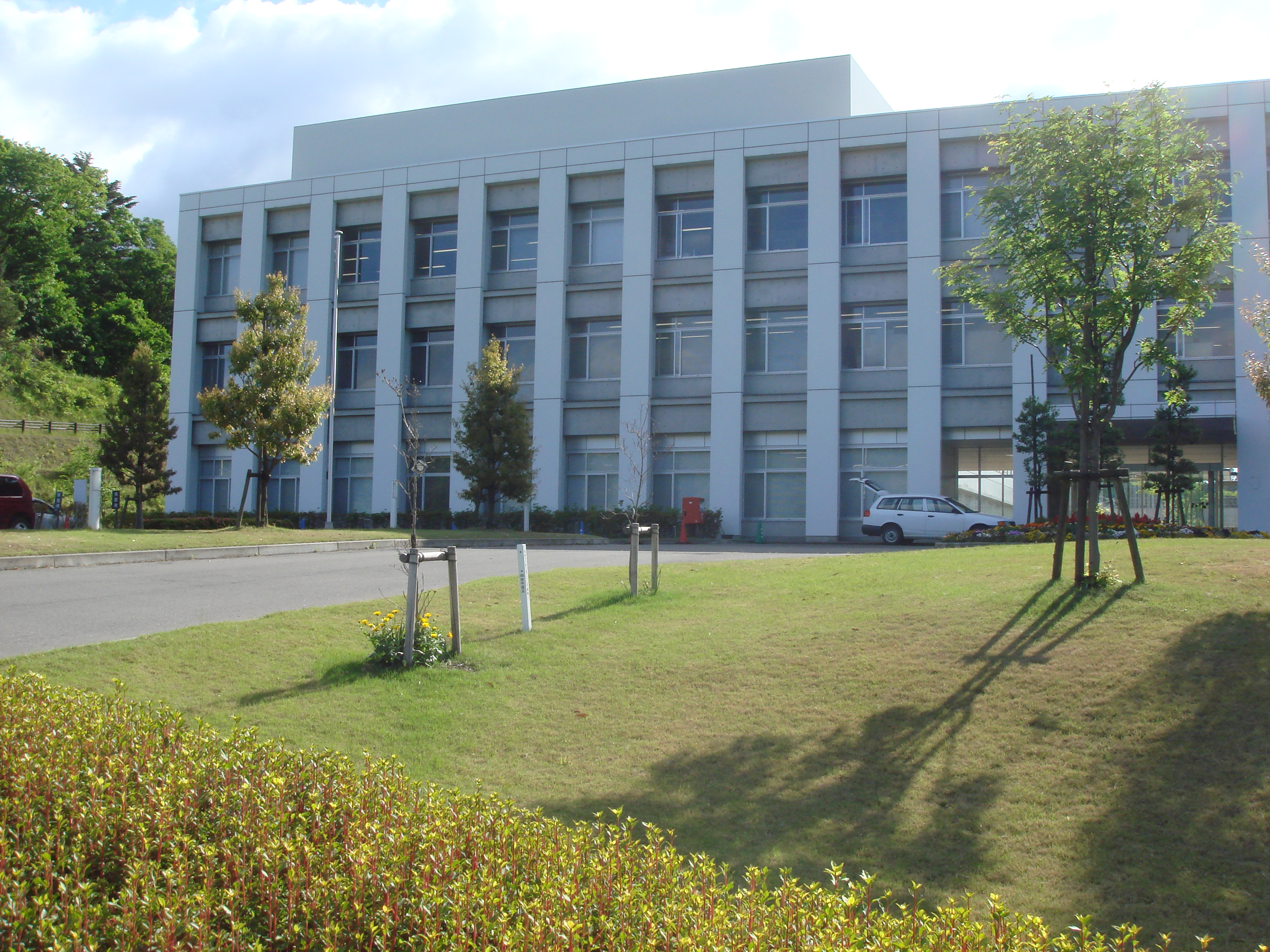
Niigata University of Pharmacy and Applied Life Sciences

Niigata University of Pharmacy and Applied Life Sciences (新潟薬科大学, Niigata Yakka Daigaku) is a private university in Niigata, Niigata, Japan. It was established in 1977.
