= Japan National Route 403 =

Road in Japan

National Route 403
- 国道403号
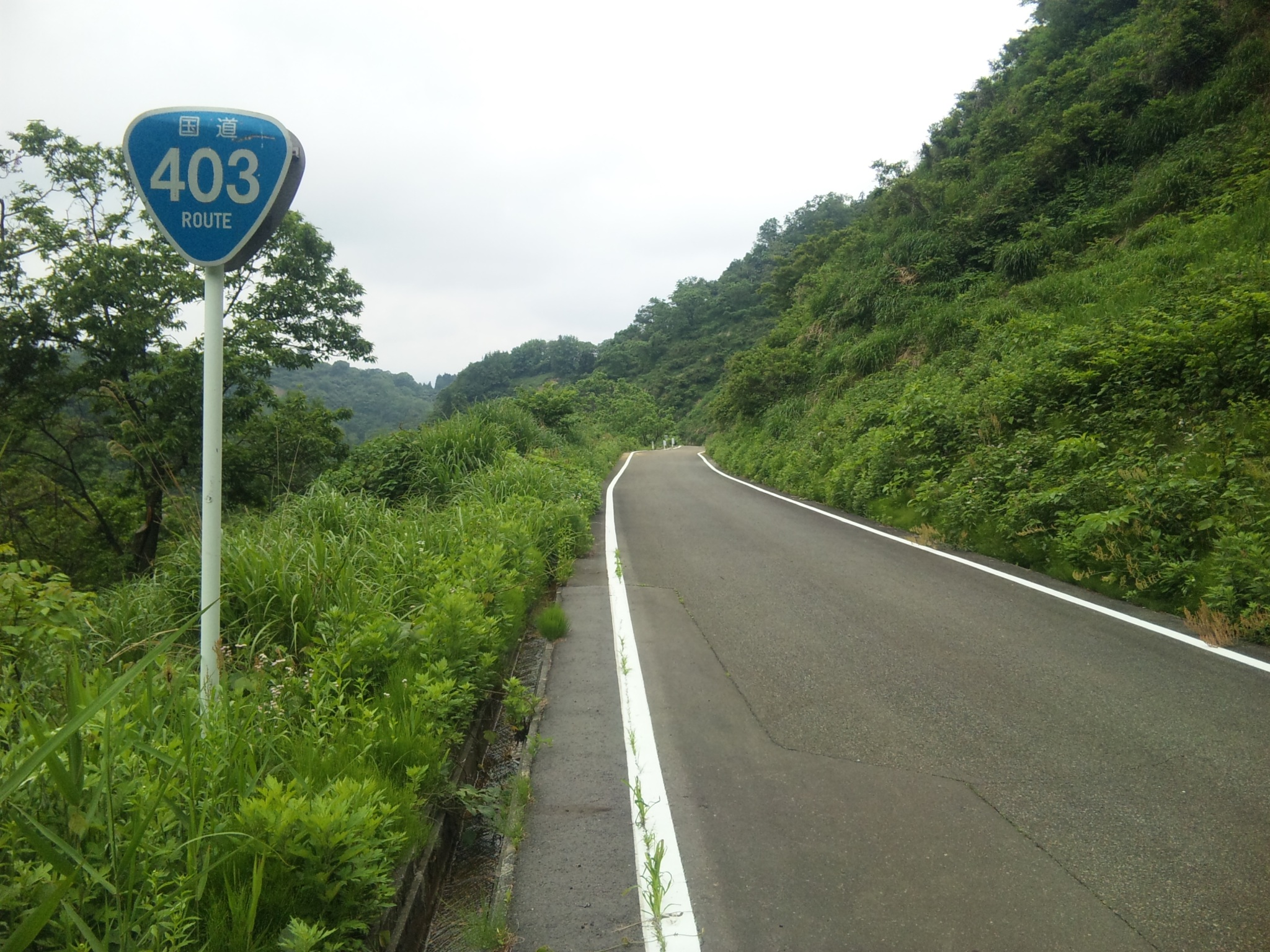

Route information
- Length: 352.8 km (219.2 mi)

Location
- Country: Japan

Highway system
- National highways of Japan; Expressways of Japan
← National Route 402	→ National Route 404

National Route 403 is a national highway of Japan connecting Chūō-ku, Niigata and Matsumoto, Nagano in Japan, with a total length of 352.8 km (219.22 mi).
