= Kita-Horinouchi Station =

Railway station in Uonuma, Niigata Prefecture, Japan

Coordinates: 37.2560°N 138.8965°E

Kita-Horinouchi Station 北堀之内駅
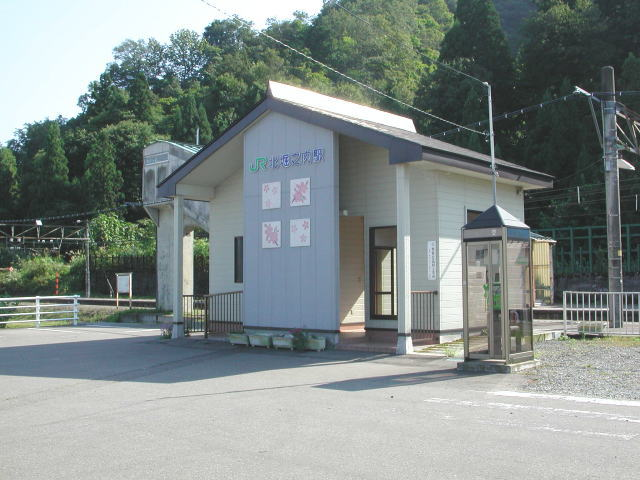
- Kita-Horinouchi Station, September 2004

General information
- Location: Shimojima, Uonuma-shi, Niigata-ken; Japan
- Operator: JR East
- Line: ■Jōetsu Line
- Platforms: 2 side platforms

Other information
- Status: Unstaffed
- Website: Official website

History
- Opened: 1950; 76 years ago

Services
Preceding station	JR East	Following station
Echigo-Horinouchi towards Takasaki	Jōetsu Line	Echigo-Kawaguchi towards Nagaoka
Location
- Location within Japan

Kita-Horinouchi Station (北堀之内駅, Kita-Horinouchi-eki) is a railway station on the Jōetsu Line in Uonuma, Niigata, Japan, operated by the East Japan Railway Company (JR East).

== Lines ==
Kita-Horinouchi Station is a station on the Jōetsu Line, and is located 138.1 kilometers from the starting point of the line at Takasaki.

== Station layout ==
The station has two single ground-level opposed side platforms serving two tracks, connected by a level crossing. The station is unattended.

=== Platforms ===
1	■ Jōetsu Line	for Koide, Echigo-Yuzawa
2	■ Jōetsu Line	for Nagaoka

== History ==
Kita-Horinouchi Station opened on 15 February 1950. Upon the privatization of the Japanese National Railways (JNR) on 1 April 1987, it came under the control of JR East.

== Surrounding area ==
- Japan National Route 17

== See also ==
- List of railway stations in Japan
