= Uonuma Tunnel =

Railway tunnel in Honshu, Japan

Uonuma Railway Tunnel
- Map of Jōetsu-Shinkansen line
- Interactive map of Uonuma Railway Tunnel

Overview
- Line: Jōetsu Shinkansen
- Location: between Nagaoka Station and Urasa Station
- Coordinates: 37°16′9.174″N 138°52′30.4134″E
- Status: active

Operation
- Opened: 1982
- Operator: East Japan Railway Company
- Traffic: Railway
- Character: Passenger and Freight

Technical
- Line length: 8,625 m (28,297 ft)
- No. of tracks: 2

Uonuma Tunnel (魚沼トンネル, Uonuma tonneru) is a tunnel on Jōetsu Shinkansen near Echigo-Kawaguchi Station, Nagaoka city, Niigata Prefecture with total length of 8.625 km. It was built and completed in 1982.

== See also ==
- List of tunnels in Japan
- Seikan Tunnel undersea tunnel between Honshu-Hokkaido islands
- Kanmon Railway Tunnel undersea tunnel between Honshu-Kyushu islands
- Sakhalin–Hokkaido Tunnel
- Bohai Strait tunnel
