= Kamimoku Station =

Railway station in Minakami, Gunma Prefecture, Japan

Kamimoku Station 上牧駅
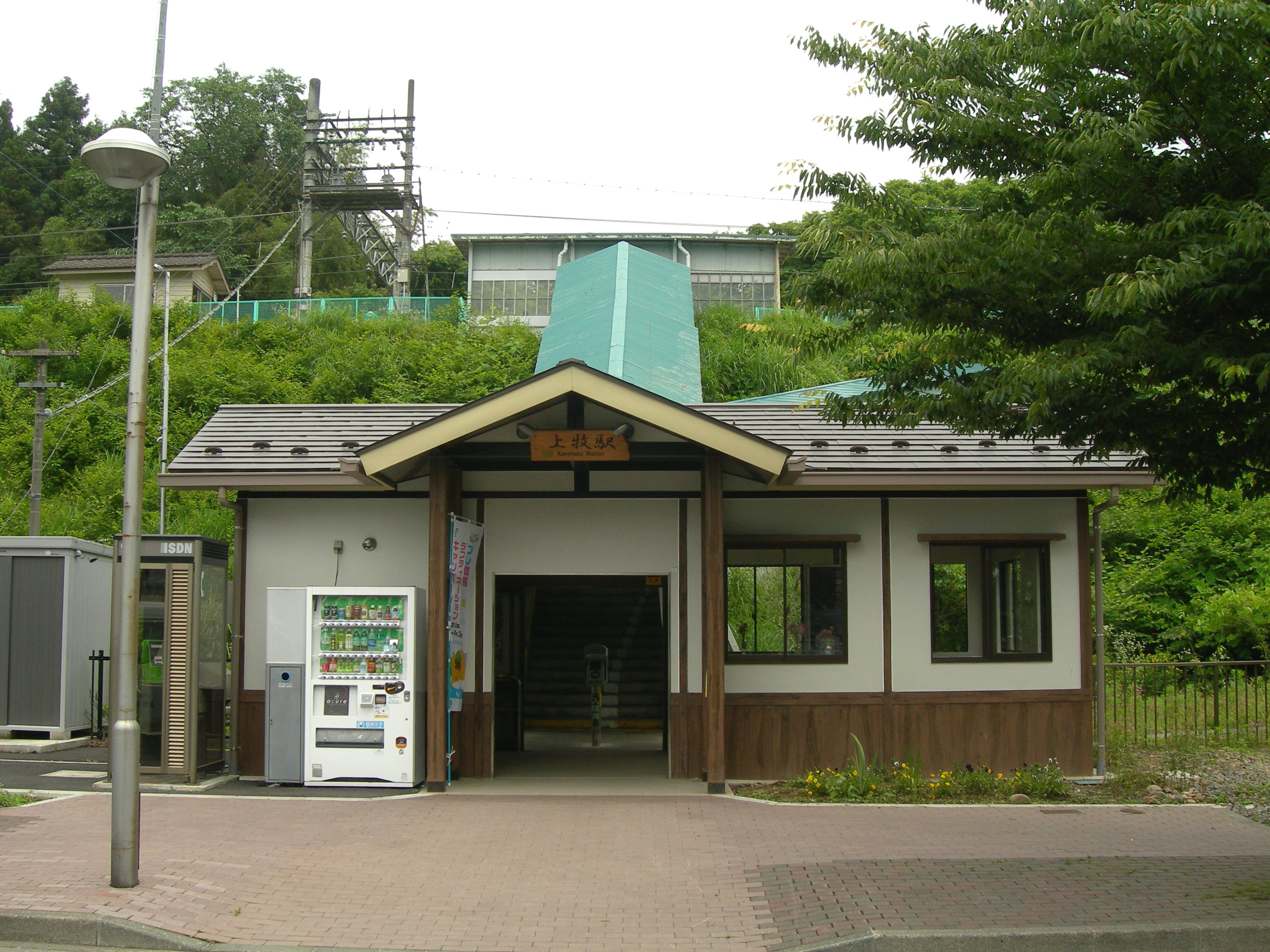
- Kamimoku Station, July 2010

General information
- Location: Kamimoku 2145, Minakami-machi, Tone-gun, Gunma-ken; Japan
- Coordinates: 36°44′08″N 138°59′03″E
- Operator: JR East
- Line: ■ Jōetsu Line
- Distance: 53.7 km from Takasaki
- Platforms: 2 side platforms

Other information
- Status: Unstaffed
- Website: Official website

History
- Opened: 30 October 1928; 97 years ago

Passengers
- FY2011: 127 daily

Services
Preceding station	JR East	Following station
Gokan towards Takasaki	Jōetsu Line	Minakami towards Nagaoka
Location
- Location within Gunma Prefecture Location within Japan

Kamimoku Station (上牧駅, Kamimoku-eki) is a passenger railway station in the town of Minakami, Gunma, Japan, operated by the East Japan Railway Company (JR East).

== Lines ==
Kamimoku Station is a station on the Jōetsu Line, and is located 53.7 kilometers from the starting point of the line at Takasaki.

== Station layout ==
The station consists of two opposed side platforms built on an embankment, and connected to the station building by an underground passage. The station is unattended.

=== Platforms ===
1	■ Jōetsu Line	for Minakami, Nagaoka
2	■ Jōetsu Line	for Shibukawa and Takasaki

== History ==
Kamimoku Station opened on 30 October 1928. Upon the privatization of the Japanese National Railways (JNR) on 1 April 1987, it came under the control of JR East.

== Surrounding area ==
- Kamimoku Onsen
- Kamimoku Post Office

== See also ==
- List of railway stations in Japan
