= Jōetsu International Skiing Ground Station =

Railway station in Minamiuonuma, Niigata Prefecture, Japan

Jōetsu International Skiing Ground Station 上越国際スキー場前駅
- The waiting room and stairs to the down platform on the north side of the station in July 2021

General information
- Location: Kabanosawa, Minamiuonuma-shi, Niigata-ken 949-6431; Japan
- Coordinates: 37.0287°N 138.8279°E
- Elevation: 208.9 m
- Operator: JR East
- Line: ■ Joetsu Line
- Distance: 105.6 km from Takasaki
- Platforms: 2 side platforms
- Tracks: 2

Construction
- Accessible: No access

Other information
- Status: Unstaffed
- Website: Official website

History
- Opened: 27 December 1997; 28 years ago
- Former names: Jōetsukokusaisukījōmae

Services
Preceding station	JR East	Following station
Ōsawa towards Takasaki	Jōetsu Line	Shiozawa towards Nagaoka
Preceding station	Hokuhoku Express	Following station
Echigo-Yuzawa Terminus	Hokuhoku Line Local (limited service)	Shiozawa (limited service) towards Naoetsu
Location
- Location within Japan

Jōetsu International Skiing Ground Station (上越国際スキー場前駅, Jōetsu-Kokusai-Sukī-jō-mae-eki) is a railway station on the Joetsu Line in the city of Minamiuonuma, Niigata, Japan, operated by East Japan Railway Company (JR East).

== Lines ==
Jōetsu International Skiing Ground Station is served by the Joetsu Line, and is located 105.6 kilometers from the starting point of the line at Takasaki.

== Station layout ==
The station is unstaffed and consists of two elevated side platforms serving two tracks. The platforms are long enough to handle four-car trains. There is no access between the two platforms except via the road passing beneath the tracks. Simple prefab waiting rooms are provided at ground level on either side of the station, as there are no shelter facilities on the platforms.

=== Platforms ===
(South)	■ Joetsu Line	for Nagaoka
(North)	■ Joetsu Line	for Echigo-Yuzawa and Minakami

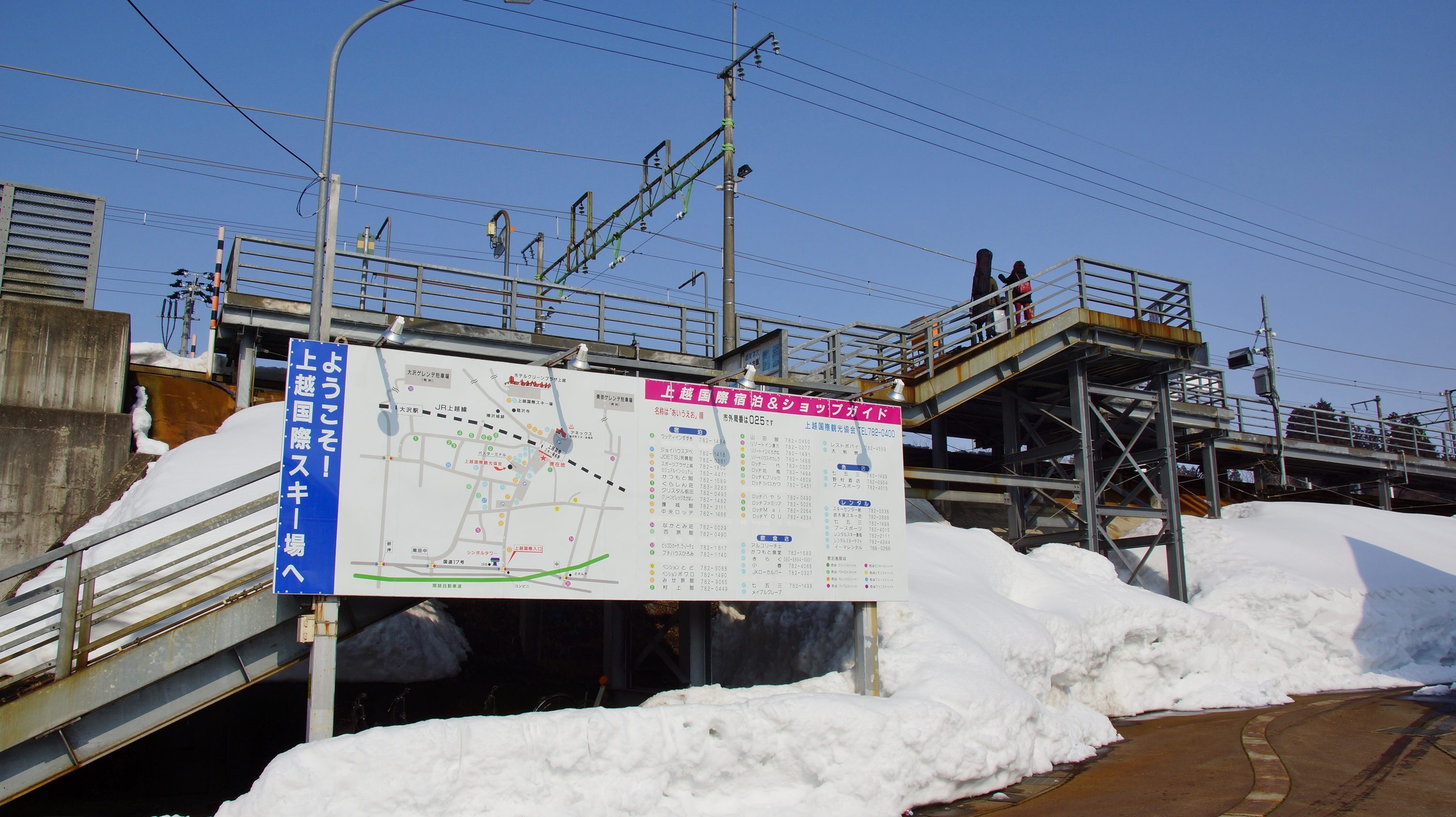
The stairs to the up platform on the south side of the station in January 2015

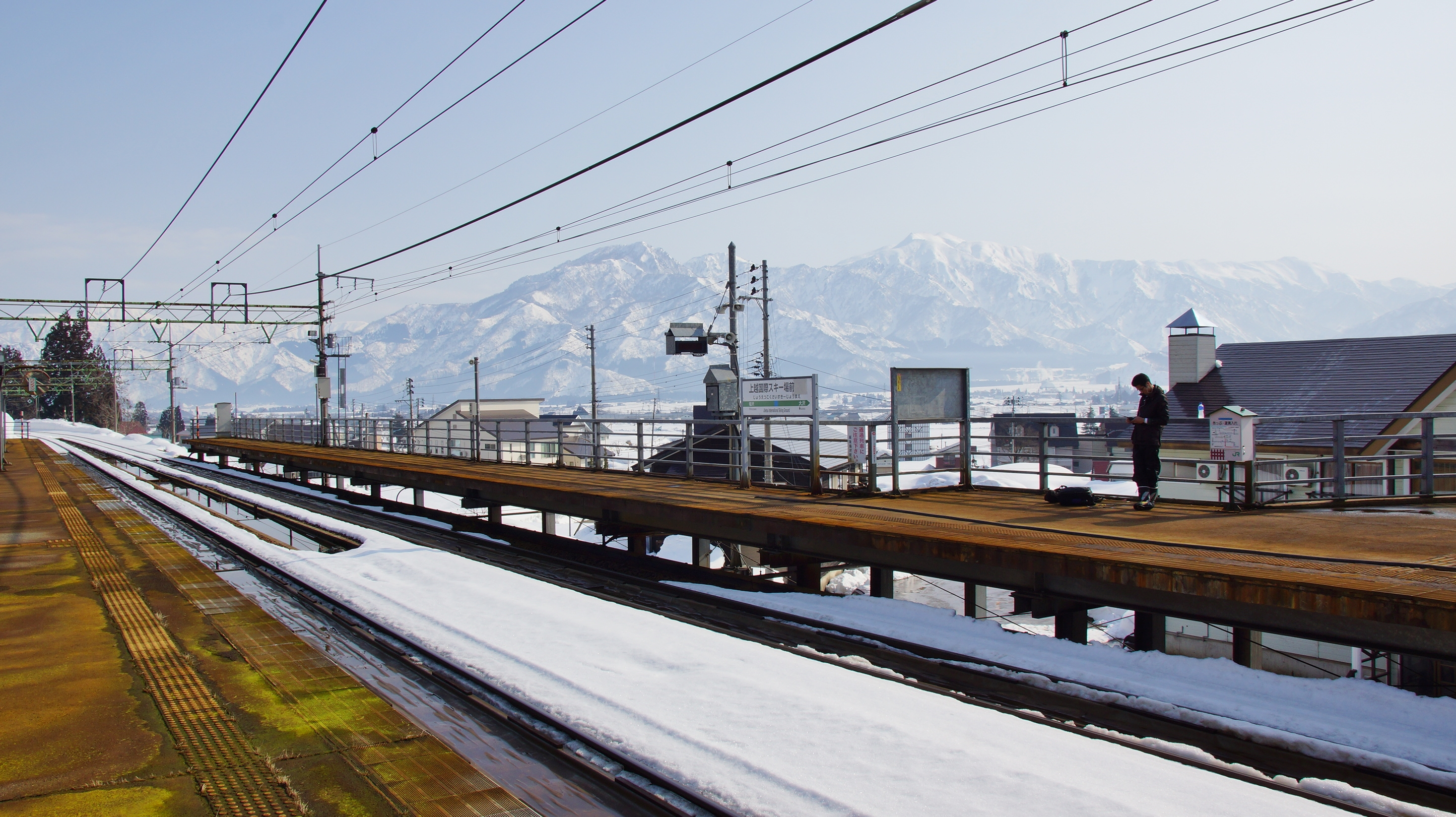
The view from the down platform in January 2015

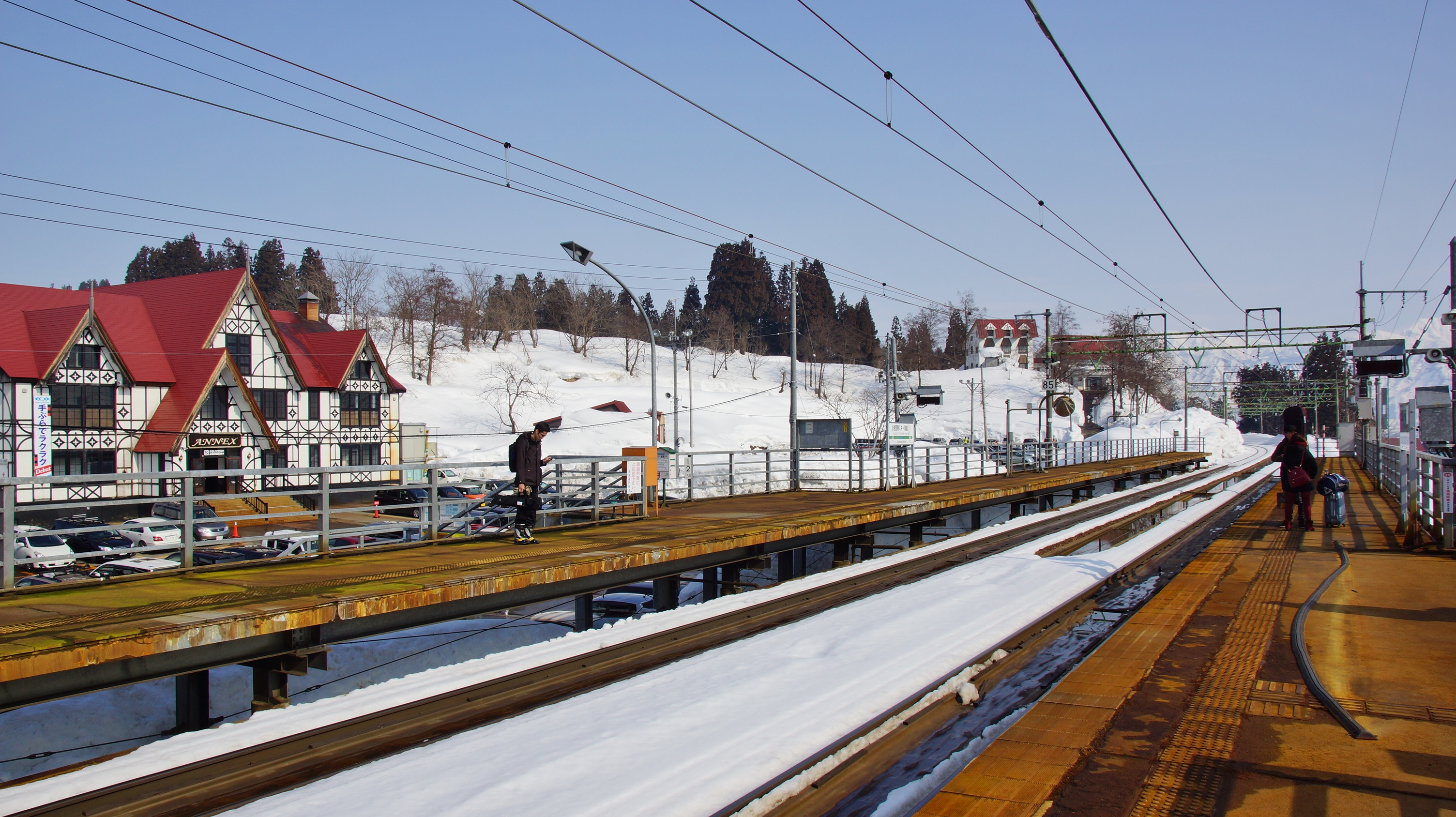
The view from the up platform in January 2015

== History ==
The station opened on 27 December 1997.

== Surrounding area ==
- Joetsu International Ski Slope
- Hotel Green Plaza Joetsu
- Joetsu International Play Land

== See also ==
- List of railway stations in Japan
