= Echigo-Takiya Station =

Railway station in Nagaoka, Niigata Prefecture, Japan

Echigo-Takiya Station 越後滝谷駅
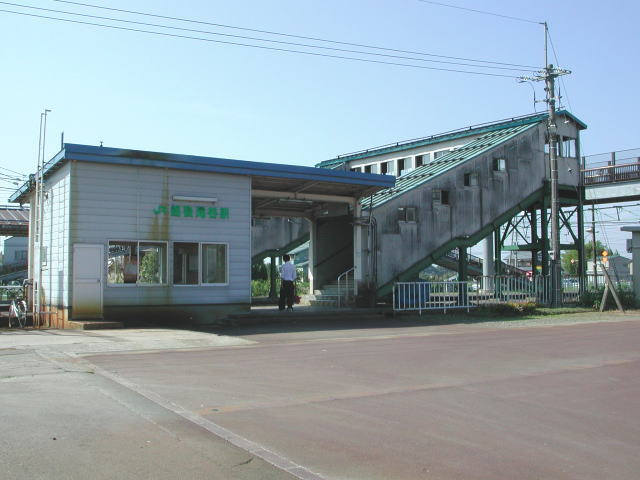
- Echigo-Takiya Station in September 2004

General information
- Location: 402 Takiya, Nagaoka-shi, Niigata-ken 940-1138; Japan
- Coordinates: 37.3687°N 138.8351°E
- Operator: JR East
- Line: ■ Jōetsu Line
- Distance: 156.6 km from Takasaki.
- Platforms: 2 side platforms
- Tracks: 2

Other information
- Status: Unstaffed
- Website: Official website

History
- Opened: 1 November 1920; 106 years ago
- Former names: Muikaichi Station (to 1925)

Services
Preceding station	JR East	Following station
Ojiya towards Takasaki	Jōetsu Line	Miyauchi towards Nagaoka
Location
- Location within Japan

Echigo-Takiya Station (越後滝谷駅, Echigo-Takiya-eki) is a railway station in the city of Nagaoka, Niigata, Japan, operated by East Japan Railway Company (JR East).

== Lines ==
Echigo-Takiya Station is served by the Jōetsu Line and Iiyama Line. It is 156.6 kilometers from the terminus of the Jōetsu Line at Takasaki.

== Station layout ==
The station consists of two opposed ground-level side platforms serving two tracks. The platforms are connected by a footbridge. The station is unattended.

=== Platforms ===
1	■ Jōetsu Line	for Echigo-Yuzawa, Echigo-Nakazato and Minakami
2	■ Jōetsu Line	for Nagaoka

== History ==
The station opened on 1 November 1920 as Muikaichi Station (六日市駅, Muikaichi ski). It was renamed to its present name on 1 October 1925. With the privatization of Japanese National Railways (JNR) on 1 April 1987, the station came under the control of JR East.

== Surrounding area ==
- Konan Middle School

== See also ==
- List of railway stations in Japan
