= Echigo-Hirose Station =

Railway station in Uonuma, Niigata Prefecture, Japan

Coordinates: 37.2742°N 138.9811°E

Echigo-Hirose Station 越後広瀬駅
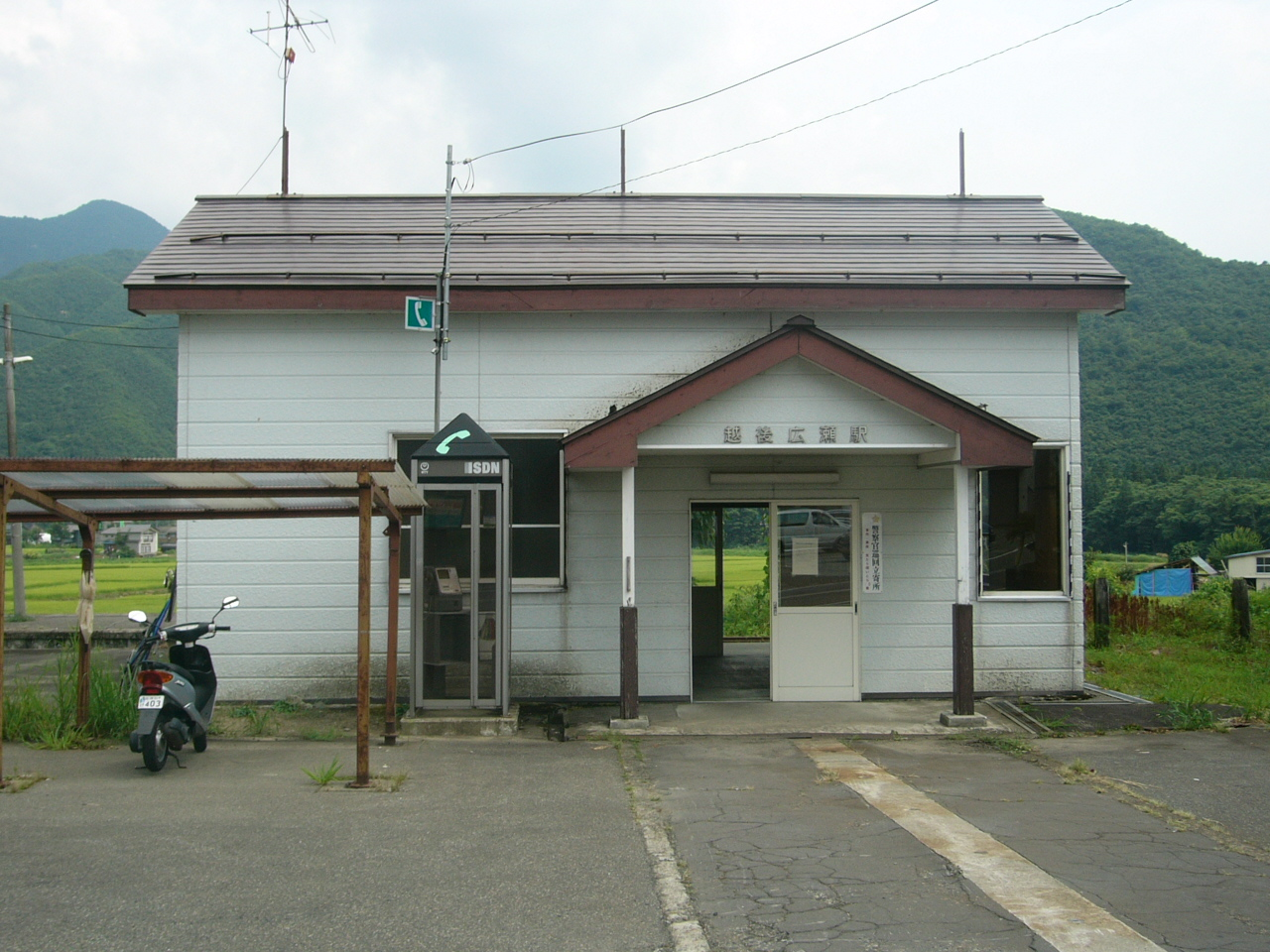
- Echigo-Hirose Station in August 2006

General information
- Location: Namiyanagi, Uonuma-shi, Niigata-ken 946-0111; Japan
- Operator: JR East
- Line: ■ Tadami Line
- Platforms: 1 side platform
- Tracks: 1

Other information
- Website: www.jreast.co.jp/estation/station/info.aspx?StationCd=281

History
- Opened: 1 November 1942

Services
| Preceding station | JR East | Following station |
|---|---|---|
| Yabukami towards Koide | Tadami Line | Uonuma-Tanaka towards Aizu-Wakamatsu |
Location
- Location within JR Tadami Line Location within Japan

Echigo-Hirose Station (越後広瀬駅, Echigo-Hirose-eki) is a railway station in Uonuma, Niigata, Japan, operated by East Japan Railway Company (JR East).

== Lines ==
Echigo-Hirose Station is served by the Tadami Line, and is 129.5 kilometers from terminus of the line at Aizu-Wakamatsu.

== Station layout ==
The station consists of one ground-level side platform serving a single bi-directional track. The station is unattended.

== History ==
Echigo-Hirose Station opened on 1 November 1942, as an intermediate station on the initial western section of the Tadami Line between Koide and Ōshirakawa. Along with the rest of the Tadami Line, the station came under the ownership of the Japanese National Railways (JNR) in 1949, and was absorbed into the JR East network upon the privatization of the JNR on April 1, 1987.

== Surrounding area ==
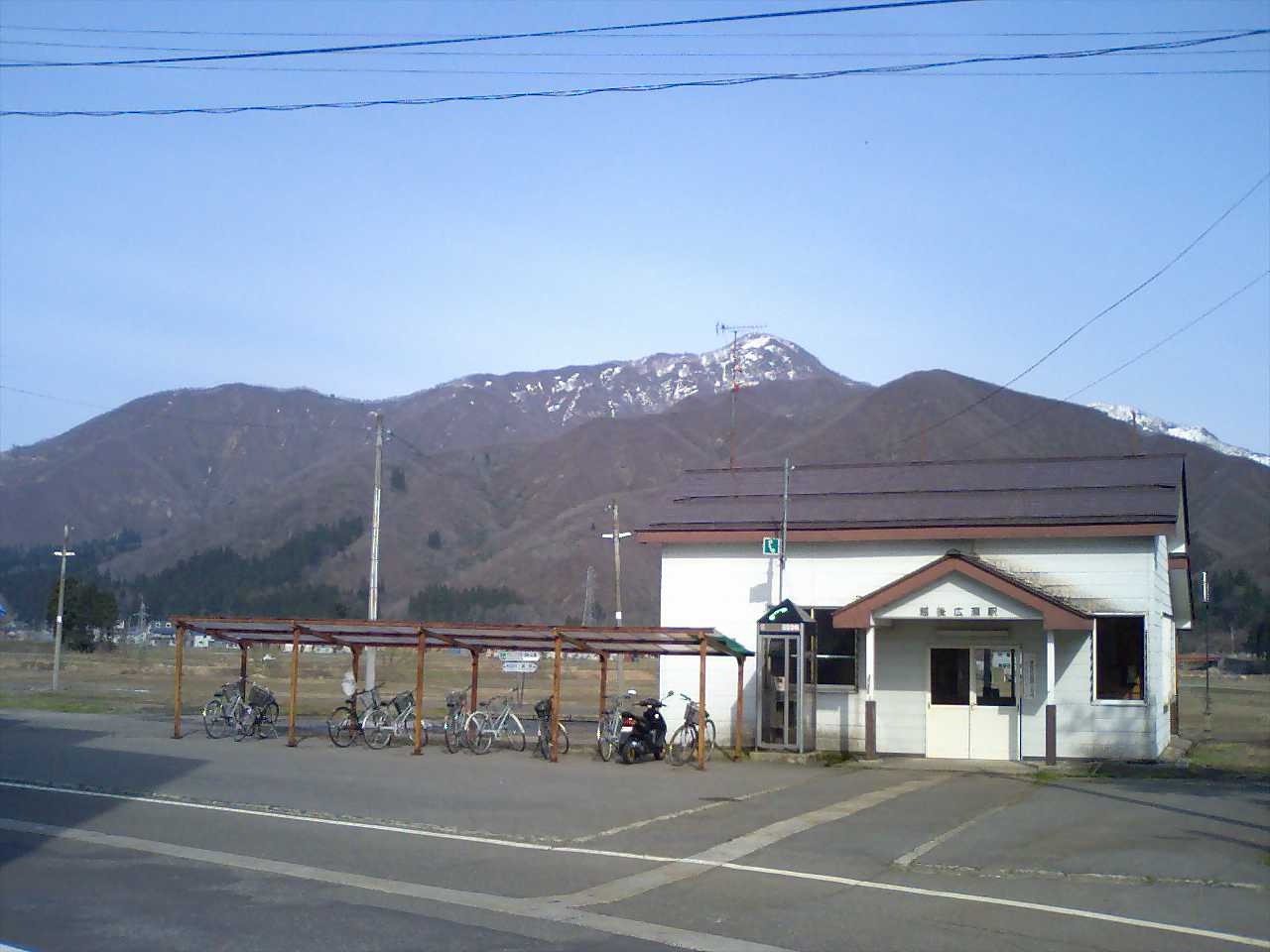
The station and Mt. Shimo-Gongendo

- Hirokami Post Office
- Japan National Route 252
- Japan National Route 291
- Japan National Route 352

== See also ==
- List of railway stations in Japan
