= Itsukamachi Station =

Railway station in Minamiuonuma, Niigata Prefecture, Japan

Itsukamachi Station 五日町駅
- Itsukamachi Station, September 2021

General information
- Location: Itsukamachi, Minamiuonuma-shi, Niigata-ken 949-7101; Japan
- Coordinates: 37.1197°N 138.9081°E
- Operator: JR East; JR Freight
- Line: ■Jōetsu Line
- Distance: 118.4 km from Takasaki
- Platforms: 1 side + island platform

Other information
- Status: Unstaffed
- Website: Official website

History
- Opened: 18 November 1923; 102 years ago

Passengers
- FY2013: 237 daily

Services
Preceding station	JR East	Following station
Muikamachi towards Takasaki	Jōetsu Line	Urasa towards Nagaoka
Location
- Location within Japan

Itsukamachi Station (五日町駅, Itsukamachi-eki) is a railway station on the Jōetsu Line in the city of Minamiuonuma, Niigata, Japan, operated by the East Japan Railway Company (JR East). It is also a freight terminal for the Japan Freight Railway Company.

== Lines ==
Ishiuchi Station is a station on the Jōetsu Line, and is located 118.4 kilometers from the starting point of the line at Takasaki.

== Station layout ==
The station has a single ground-level side platform and an island platform serving three tracks. The station is unattended.

=== Platforms ===
1	■ Jōetsu Line	for Nagaoka, Niigata
2	■ Jōetsu Line	(siding)
3	■ Jōetsu Line	for Echigo-Yuzawa, Minakami

== History ==
Itsukamachi Station opened on 18 November 1923. Upon the privatization of the Japanese National Railways (JNR) on 1 April 1987, it came under the control of JR East.

== Surrounding area ==
- Itsukamachi Elementary School
- Itsukamachi Ski Resort

== See also ==
- List of railway stations in Japan
