= Iwamoto Station =

Railway station in Numata, Gunma Prefecture, Japan

Iwamoto Station 岩本駅
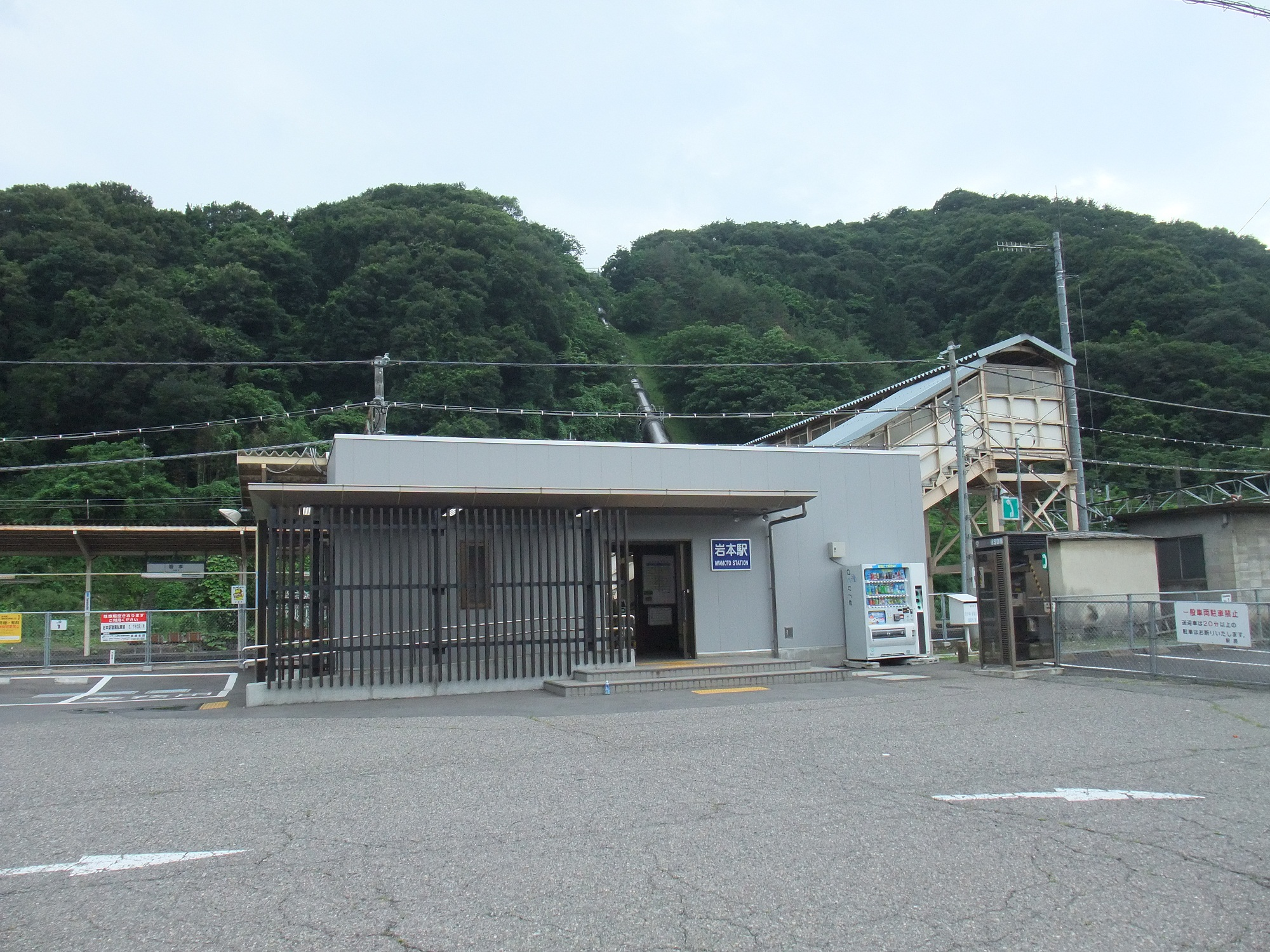
- Iwamoto Station, July 2012

General information
- Location: Iwamoto 173, Numata-shi, Gunma-ken 378-0021; Japan
- Coordinates: 36°36′11.05″N 139°2′50.26″E
- Operator: JR East
- Line: ■ Jōetsu Line
- Distance: 36.3 km from Takasaki
- Platforms: 1 side + 1 island platform

Other information
- Status: Unstaffed
- Website: Official website

History
- Opened: 31 March 1924; 102 years ago

Passengers
- FY2011: 238

Services
Preceding station	JR East	Following station
Tsukuda towards Takasaki	Jōetsu Line	Numata towards Nagaoka
Location
- Location within Gunma Prefecture Location within Japan

Iwamoto Station (岩本駅, Iwamoto-eki) is a passenger railway station in the city of Numata, Gunma, Japan, operated by the East Japan Railway Company (JR East).

== Lines ==
Iwamoto Station is a station on the Jōetsu Line, and is located 36.3 kilometers from the starting point of the line at Takasaki.

== Station layout ==
The station has a single side platform and a single island platform connected to the station building by a footbridge; however, one side of the island platform is not in use. The station is unattended.

=== Platforms ===
1	■ Jōetsu Line	for Shibukawa and Takasaki
3	■ Jōetsu Line	for Minakami, Nagaoka

== History ==
Iwamoto Station opened on 31 March 1924. Upon the privatization of the Japanese National Railways (JNR) on 1 April 1987, it came under the control of JR East. A new station building was completed in March 2010.

== Surrounding area ==
- Tone River
- National Route 17

== See also ==
- List of railway stations in Japan
