= Yairo =

Yairo is a given name. Notable people with the name include:

- Yairo Moreno (born 1995), Colombian footballer
- Yairo Muñoz (born 1995), Dominican baseball player
- Yairo Yau (born 1989), Panamanian footballer

== See also ==
- Nairo
- Yairo Station
