= Yairo Station =

Railway station in Minamiuonuma, Niigata Prefecture, Japan

Yairo Station 八色駅
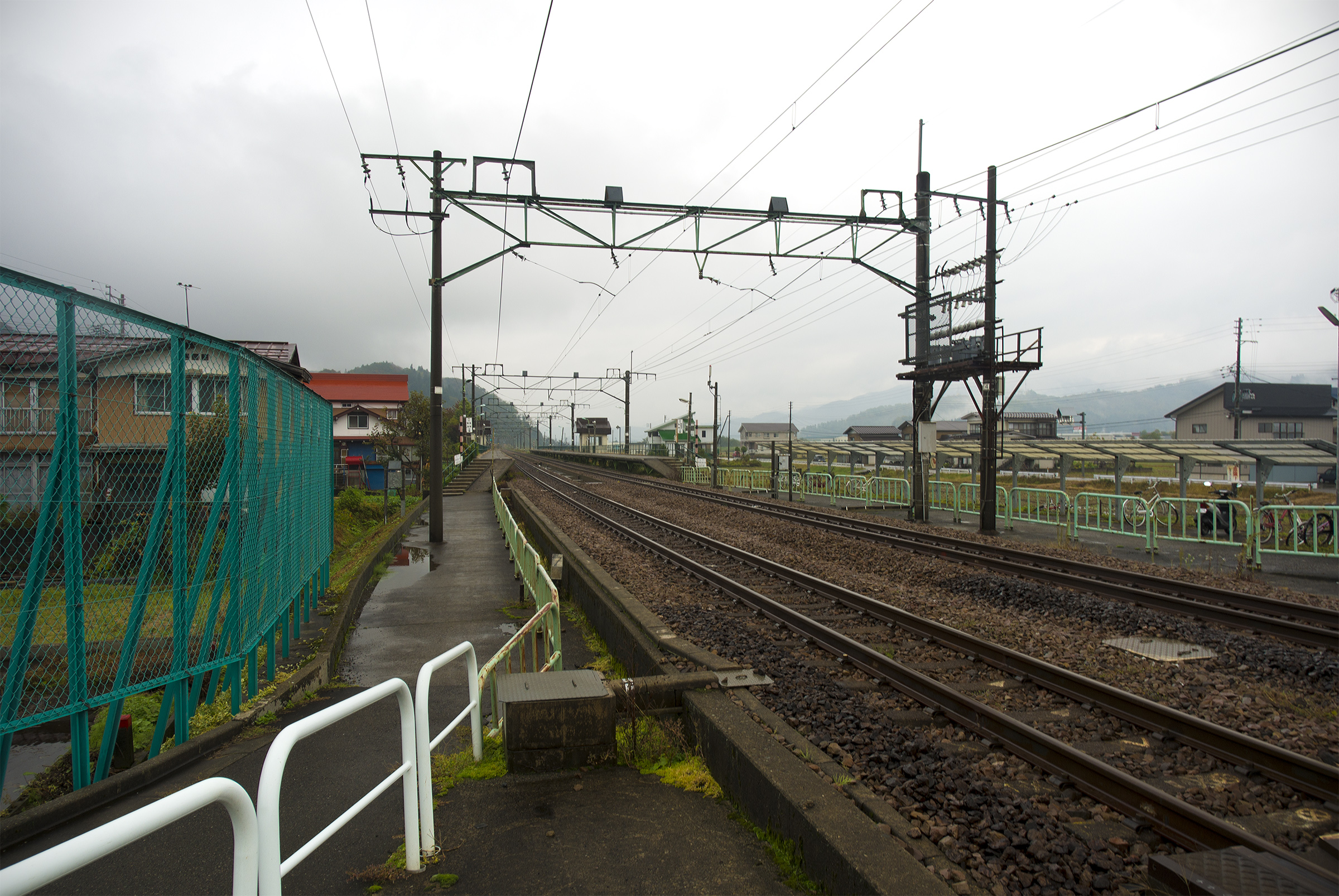
- Yairo Station in February 2013

General information
- Location: Goka, Minamiuonuma-shi, Niigata-ken 949-7301; Japan
- Coordinates: 37.1917°N 138.9351°E
- Operator: JR East
- Line: ■ Jōetsu Line
- Distance: 127.0 km from Takasaki
- Platforms: 2 side platforms
- Tracks: 2

Other information
- Status: Unstaffed
- Website: Official website

History
- Opened: 1 January 1965; 61 years ago

Services
Preceding station	JR East	Following station
Urasa towards Takasaki	Jōetsu Line	Koide towards Nagaoka
Location
- Location within Japan

Yairo Station (八色駅, Yairo-eki) is a railway station in the city of Minamiuonuma, Niigata, Japan, operated by East Japan Railway Company (JR East).

== Lines ==
Yairo Station is served by the Jōetsu Line, and is 127.0 kilometers from terminus of the line at Takasaki.

== Station layout ==
The station consists of two ground-level opposed unnumbered side platforms serving two tracks, connected by a level crossing. There is no station building, but only a weather shelter on each platform. The station is unattended.

=== Platforms ===
East	■ Jōetsu Line	for Nagaoka
West	■ Jōetsu Line	for Ishiuchi, Echigo-Yuzawa, and Minakami

== History ==
The station opened on 1 January 1965. With the privatization of Japanese National Railways (JNR) on 1 April 1987, the station came under the control of JR East.

== Surrounding area ==
- Minami-Koide Industrial Park
- National Route 17

== See also ==
- List of railway stations in Japan
