= Tsukuda Station (Gunma) =

Railway station in Shibukawa, Gunma Prefecture, Japan

Tsukuda Station 津久田駅
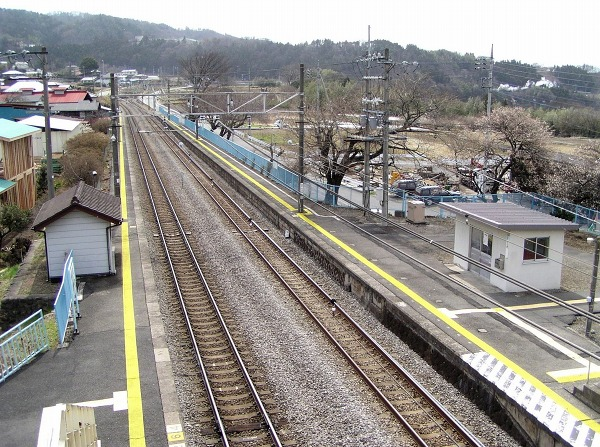
- Tsukuda Station, August 2006

General information
- Location: Akagi-machi Tsukuda 2854-2, Shibukawa-shi, Gunma-ken 379-1103; Japan
- Coordinates: 36.5609°N 139.0427°E
- Operator: JR East
- Line: ■ Jōetsu Line
- Distance: 30.5 km from Takasaki
- Platforms: 2 side platforms

Other information
- Status: Unstaffed
- Website: Official website

History
- Opened: 1 January 1948; 78 years ago

Passengers
- FY2011: 40 daily

Services
Preceding station	JR East	Following station
Shikishima towards Takasaki	Jōetsu Line	Iwamoto towards Nagaoka
Location
- Location within Gunma Prefecture Location within Japan

Tsukuda Station (津久田駅, Tsukuda-eki) is a passenger railway station in the city of Shibukawa, Gunma, Japan, operated by the East Japan Railway Company (JR East).

== Lines ==
Tsukuda Station is a station on the Jōetsu Line, and is located 30.5 kilometers from the starting point of the line at Takasaki.

== Station layout ==
The station has two opposed side platforms connected to the station building by a footbridge. The station is unattended.

=== Platforms ===
1	■ Jōetsu Line	for Shibukawa,Takasaki
2	■ Jōetsu Line	for Minakami, Nagaoka

== History ==
Tsukuda Station opened on 1 October 1943 as a signal stop and was elevated to a full station on 1 January 1948. Upon the privatization of the Japanese National Railways (JNR) on 1 April 1987, it came under the control of JR East. A new station building was completed in March 2003.

== Surrounding area ==
- Tone River
- National Route 17

== See also ==
- List of railway stations in Japan
