= Ojiya Station =

Railway station in Ojiya, Niigata Prefecture, Japan

Ojiya Station 小千谷駅
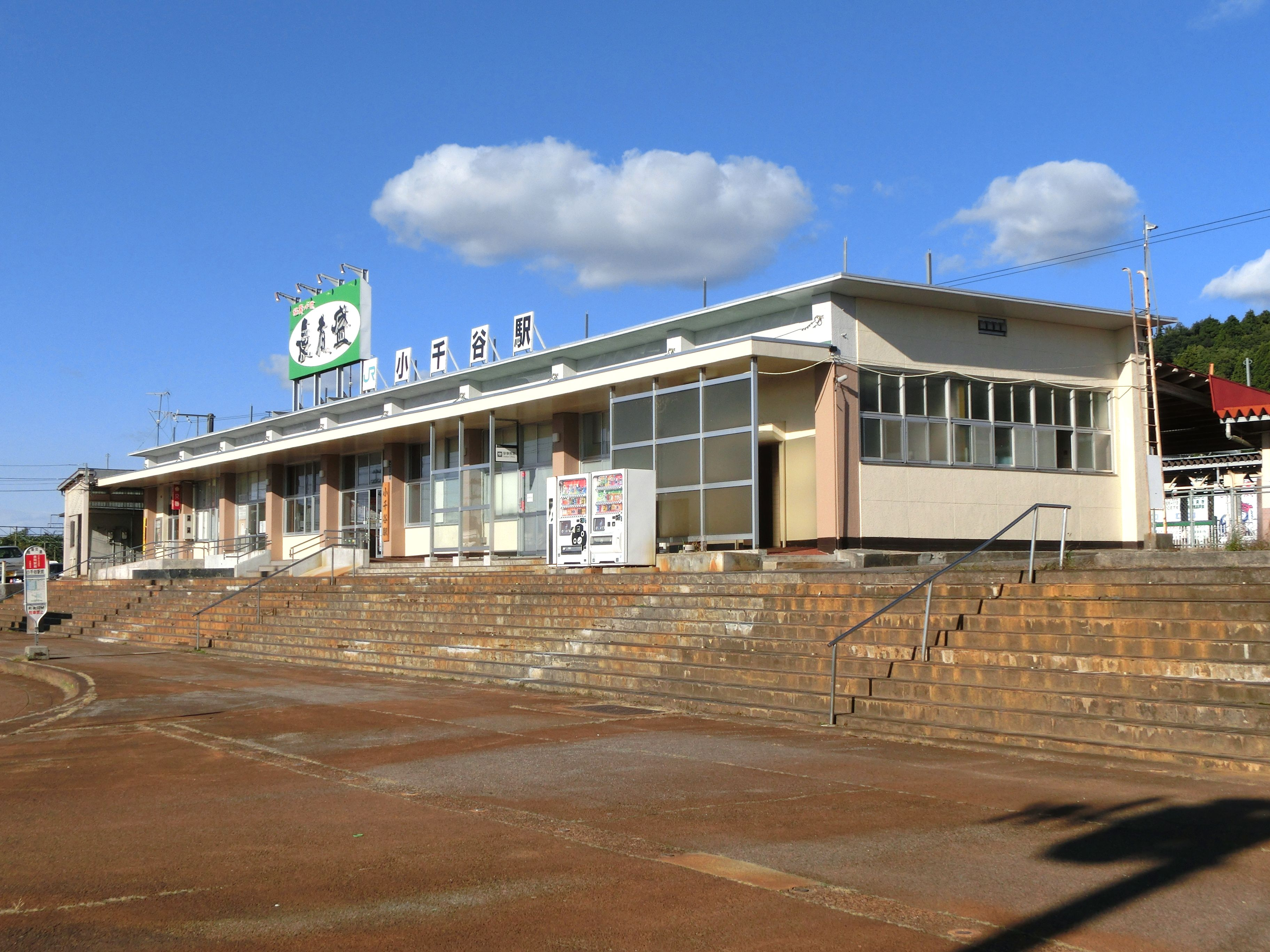
- Ojiya Station in October 2012

General information
- Location: 1 Toei, Ojiya-shi, Niigata-ken 947-0004
- Coordinates: 37.3096°N 138.8131°E
- Operator: JR East
- Line: ■ Jōetsu Line
- Distance: 149.4 km from Takasaki
- Platforms: 1 side + 1 island platforms
- Tracks: 3

Other information
- Status: Staffed (Midori no Madoguchi )
- Website: Official website

History
- Opened: 1 November 1920; 105 years ago
- Former names: Higashi-Ojiya (until 1932)

Passengers
- FY2017: 1282

Services
Preceding station	JR East	Following station
Echigo-Kawaguchi towards Takasaki	Jōetsu Line	Echigo-Takiya towards Nagaoka
Location
- Location within Japan

Ojiya Station (小千谷駅, Ojiya-eki) is a railway station on the Jōetsu Line in the city of Ojiya, Niigata, Japan, operated by the East Japan Railway Company (JR East).

== Lines ==
Ojiya Station is served by the Jōetsu Line, and is located 149.4 kilometers from the starting point of the line at Takasaki.

== Station layout ==
The station has one ground-level side platform and one island platform connected by a footbridge; however, one side of the island platform is not in use. The station has a Midori no Madoguchi staffed ticket office.

=== Platforms ===
1	■ Jōetsu Line	for Nagaoka
3	■ Jōetsu Line	for Echigo-Yuzawa

== History ==
The station opened on 1 November 1920, originally named Higashi-Ojiya Station (東小千谷駅; lit. "East Ojiya Station") to distinguish it from the existing Ojiya Station on the Uonuma Railway. It was renamed simply Ojiya Station on 1 August 1932 after the Uonuma Railway station was renamed Nishi-Ojiya Station (西小千谷駅; lit. "West Ojiya Station") in July 1932. With the privatization of Japanese National Railways (JNR) on 1 April 1987, the station came under the control of JR East.

== Passenger statistics ==
In fiscal 2017, the station was used by an average of 1282 passengers daily (boarding passengers only).

== Surrounding area ==
- National Route 291
- National Route 351
- Niigata Prefectural Ojiya High School

== See also ==
- List of railway stations in Japan
