= Ōsawa Station (Niigata) =

Railway station in Minamiuonuma, Niigata Prefecture, Japan

Ōsawa Station 大沢駅
- Ōsawa Station, October 2022

General information
- Location: Ōsawa, Minamiuonuma-shi, Niigata-ken 949-6361; Japan
- Coordinates: 37°01′18″N 138°49′18″E
- Operator: JR East
- Line: ■Jōetsu Line
- Distance: 104.6 km from Takasaki
- Platforms: 2 side platforms
- Tracks: 2

Other information
- Status: Unstaffed
- Website: Official website

History
- Opened: 28 May 1949; 77 years ago

Services
Preceding station	JR East	Following station
Ishiuchi towards Takasaki	Jōetsu Line	Jōetsu International Skiing Ground towards Nagaoka
Location
- Location within Japan

Ōsawa Station (大沢駅, Ōsawa-eki) is a railway station on the Jōetsu Line in the city of Minamiuonuma, Niigata, Japan, operated by the East Japan Railway Company (JR East).

== Lines ==
Ōsawa Station is a station on the Jōetsu Line, and is located 104.6 kilometers from the starting point of the line at Takasaki.

== Station layout ==
The station has a two ground-level opposed side platforms connected by a footbridge. The station is unattended.

=== Platforms ===
station side	■ Jōetsu Line	for Minakami, Echigo-Yuzawa
opposite side	■ Jōetsu Line	for Nagaoka, Niigata

== History ==
Ōsawa Station opened on 28 May 1949. Upon the privatization of the Japanese National Railways (JNR) on 1 April 1987, it came under the control of JR East.

== Surrounding area ==
- Joetsu International Ski Resort
- Osawayama Onsen

== See also ==
- List of railway stations in Japan
