= Echigo-Horinouchi Station =

Railway station in Uonuma, Niigata Prefecture, Japan

Coordinates: 37.2394°N 138.9282°E

Echigo-Horinouchi Station 越後堀之内駅
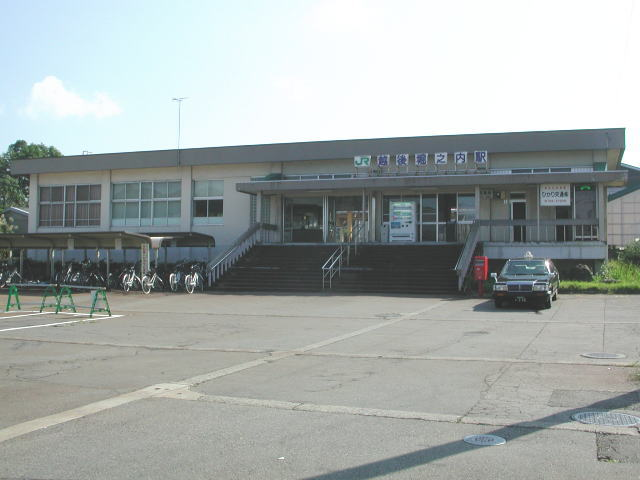
- Echigo-Horinouchi Station, September 2004

General information
- Location: 3860 Horinouchi, Uonuma-shi, Niigata-ken; Japan
- Operator: JR East
- Line: ■Jōetsu Line
- Platforms: 2 side platforms

Other information
- Status: Unstaffed
- Website: Official website

History
- Opened: 1922; 104 years ago

Passengers
- FY2015: 433 daily

Services
| Preceding station | JR East | Following station |
|---|---|---|
| Koide towards Takasaki | Jōetsu Line | Kita-Horinouchi towards Nagaoka |
Location
- Location within Japan

Echigo-Horinouchi Station (越後堀之内駅, Echigo-Horinouchi-eki) is a railway station on the Jōetsu Line in Uonuma, Niigata, Japan, operated by the East Japan Railway Company (JR East).

== Lines ==
Echigo-Horinouchi Station is a station on the Jōetsu Line, and is located 134.7 kilometers from the starting point of the line at Takasaki.

== Station layout ==
The station has two opposed ground-level side platforms serving three tracks, connected by a footbridge. The station has a Midori no Madoguchi staffed ticket office.

=== Platforms ===
| 1 | ■ Jōetsu Line | for Koide, Echigo-Yuzawa |
| 2 | ■ Jōetsu Line | for Nagaoka |

== History ==
Echigo-Horinouchi Station opened on 1 August 1922. Upon the privatization of the Japanese National Railways (JNR) on 1 April 1987, it came under the control of JR East.

== Passenger statistics ==
In fiscal 2015, the station was used by an average of 433 passengers daily (boarding passengers only).

== Surrounding area ==
- former Horinouchi town hall
- Japan National Route 17
- Horinouchi Post Office
- Horinouchi Elementary School
- Horinouchi Middle School

== See also ==
- List of railway stations in Japan
