= Jōetsu Line =

Railway line in Japan

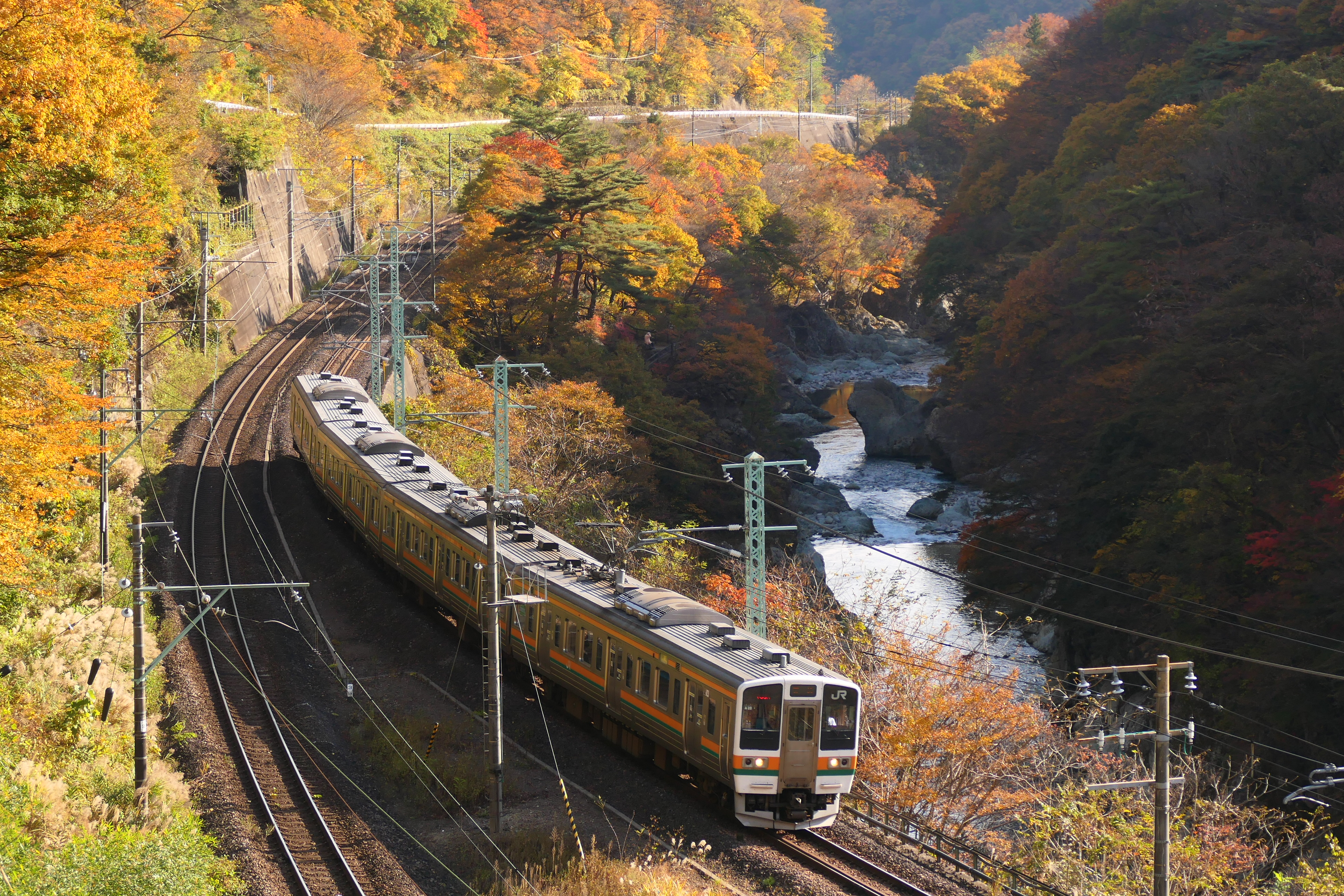
- 211 series local train (Kamimoku - Minakami)

Overview
- Native name: 上越線
- Locale: Gunma, Niigata prefectures
- Termini: Takasaki; Miyauchi
- Stations: 34

Service
- Type: Heavy rail
- Operator: JR East

History
- Opened: 1920; 106 years ago

Technical
- Line length: 162.6 km (101.03 mi)
- Track gauge: 3 ft 6 in (1,067 mm)
- Electrification: 1,500 V DC overhead catenary
Route map

The Jōetsu Line (上越線, Jōetsu-sen) is a major railway line in Japan, owned by East Japan Railway Company (JR East). It connects Takasaki Station in Gunma Prefecture with Miyauchi Station in Niigata Prefecture, linking the northwestern Kanto region and the Sea of Japan coast of the Chūbu region.

The name derives from the first characters of the old provinces of Kōzuke (上野) and Echigo (越後), which the line connects. Ironically, the line does not run through Niigata's Jōetsu region or Jōetsu City, which have a different origin, referring to "Upper Echigo".

== Services ==
Before the opening of the Jōetsu Shinkansen in 1982, the Jōetsu Line had frequent service by express trains connecting Tokyo and Niigata. With the opening of the Jōetsu Shinkansen, however, the line became dominated by local and freight trains.

The branch of the Jōetsu Shinkansen between Echigo-Yuzawa Station and Gala-Yuzawa Station (the Gala-Yuzawa Line) technically belongs to the Jōetsu Line.

== Stations ==
Station	Japanese	Distance (km)		Transfers	Location	
Station	Japanese	Between Stations	Total	Transfers	Location	
Takasaki	高崎	-	0.0	Joetsu Shinkansen; Hokuriku Shinkansen; ■ Takasaki Line; ■ Shōnan-Shinjuku Line; ■ Hachikō Line; ■ Shinetsu Main Line; ■ Jōshin Dentetsu: Jōshin Line; ■ Ryōmō Line	Takasaki	Gunma
Takasakitonyamachi	高崎問屋町	2.8	2.8	■ Ryōmō Line	Takasaki	Gunma
Ino	井野	1.2	4.0	■ Ryōmō Line	Takasaki	Gunma
Shin-Maebashi	新前橋	3.3	7.3	■ Ryōmō Line	Maebashi	Gunma
Gumma-Sōja	群馬総社	4.8	12.1		Maebashi	Gunma
Yagihara	八木原	5.6	17.7		Shibukawa	Gunma
Shibukawa	渋川	3.4	21.1	■ Agatsuma Line	Shibukawa	Gunma
Shikishima	敷島	6.4	27.5		Shibukawa	Gunma
Tsukuda	津久田	3.0	30.5		Shibukawa	Gunma
Iwamoto	岩本	5.8	36.3		Numata	Gunma
Numata	沼田	5.0	41.3		Numata	Gunma
Gokan	後閑	5.2	46.5		Minakami, Tone District	Gunma
Kamimoku	上牧	7.1	53.6		Minakami, Tone District	Gunma
Minakami	水上	5.4	59.0		Minakami, Tone District	Gunma
Yubiso	湯檜曽	3.7	62.7		Minakami, Tone District	Gunma
Doai	土合	6.6	69.3		Minakami, Tone District	Gunma
Tsuchitaru	土樽	10.8	80.1		Yuzawa, Minamiuonuma District	Niigata
Echigo-Nakazato	越後中里	7.3	87.4		Yuzawa, Minamiuonuma District	Niigata
Iwappara-Skiing Ground	岩原スキー場前	3.7	91.1		Yuzawa, Minamiuonuma District	Niigata
Echigo-Yuzawa	越後湯沢	3.1	94.2	Jōetsu Shinkansen; Jōetsu Line (for Gala-Yuzawa); ■ Hokuhoku Line	Yuzawa, Minamiuonuma District	Niigata
Ishiuchi	石打	6.4	100.6	■ Hokuhoku Line	Minamiuonuma	Niigata
Ōsawa	大沢	4.0	104.6	■ Hokuhoku Line	Minamiuonuma	Niigata
Jōetsu International Skiing Ground	上越国際スキー場前	1.0	105.6	■ Hokuhoku Line	Minamiuonuma	Niigata
Shiozawa	塩沢	2.3	107.9	■ Hokuhoku Line	Minamiuonuma	Niigata
Muikamachi	六日町	3.9	111.8	■ Hokuhoku Line	Minamiuonuma	Niigata
Itsukamachi	五日町	6.6	118.4		Minamiuonuma	Niigata
Urasa	浦佐	5.5	123.9	Jōetsu Shinkansen	Minamiuonuma	Niigata
Yairo	八色	3.1	127.0		Minamiuonuma	Niigata
Koide	小出	5.2	132.2	■ Tadami Line	Uonuma	Niigata
Echigo-Horinouchi	越後堀之内	2.5	134.7		Uonuma	Niigata
Kita-Horinouchi	北堀之内	3.4	138.1		Uonuma	Niigata
Echigo-Kawaguchi	越後川口	4.7	142.8	■ Iiyama Line	Nagaoka	Niigata
Ojiya	小千谷	6.6	149.4		Ojiya	Niigata
Echigo-Takiya	越後滝谷	7.2	156.6		Nagaoka	Niigata
Miyauchi	宮内	6.0	162.6	■ Shinetsu Main Line (for Naoetsu)	Nagaoka	Niigata
Through to Nagaoka on the Shin'etsu Main Line
Nagaoka	長岡	1.6	165.6	Jōetsu Shinkansen; ■ Shinetsu Main Line (for Niigata)	Nagaoka	Niigata

== Rolling stock ==
=== Present ===
==== Local ====
Takasaki to Minakami

- 211-3000 series 4- and 6-car EMUs (since August 2016)

Minakami to Nagaoka

- E129 series 2/4-car EMUs (since November 2015)

Takasaki to Shin-Maebashi (Takasaki Line, Ryomo Line through services)

- E231-1000 series
- E233-3000 series

==== Limited Express ====
Takasaki to Shibukawa (Takasaki Line, Agatsuma Line through services)

- E257-5500 series 5-car EMUs (Kusatsu limited express services since March 2023)

==== SL ====
SL Gunma Minakami and SL YOGISHA Minakami

- JNR 12 series 6-car Vehicles and C61-20

==== Joyful Train ====
Yuzawa to Jōetsu-Myoko

- KiHa 40 3 Car DMUs Used for Koshino Shu*Kura ( since May 2014 )

=== Former ===
==== Local ====
Takasaki to Minakami

- 115-1000 series 4-car EMUs (until March 2018)

Minakami to Nagaoka

- 115 series 2/3/4-car EMUs (until March 2016)

==== Limited Express ====
Takasaki to Shibukawa (Takasaki Line, Agatsuma Line through services)

- 185 series 7-car EMUs (Kusatsu limited express services until March 2014)

Four-car 211-3000 series EMUs entered service on the section between Takasaki and Minakami from 23 August 2016.

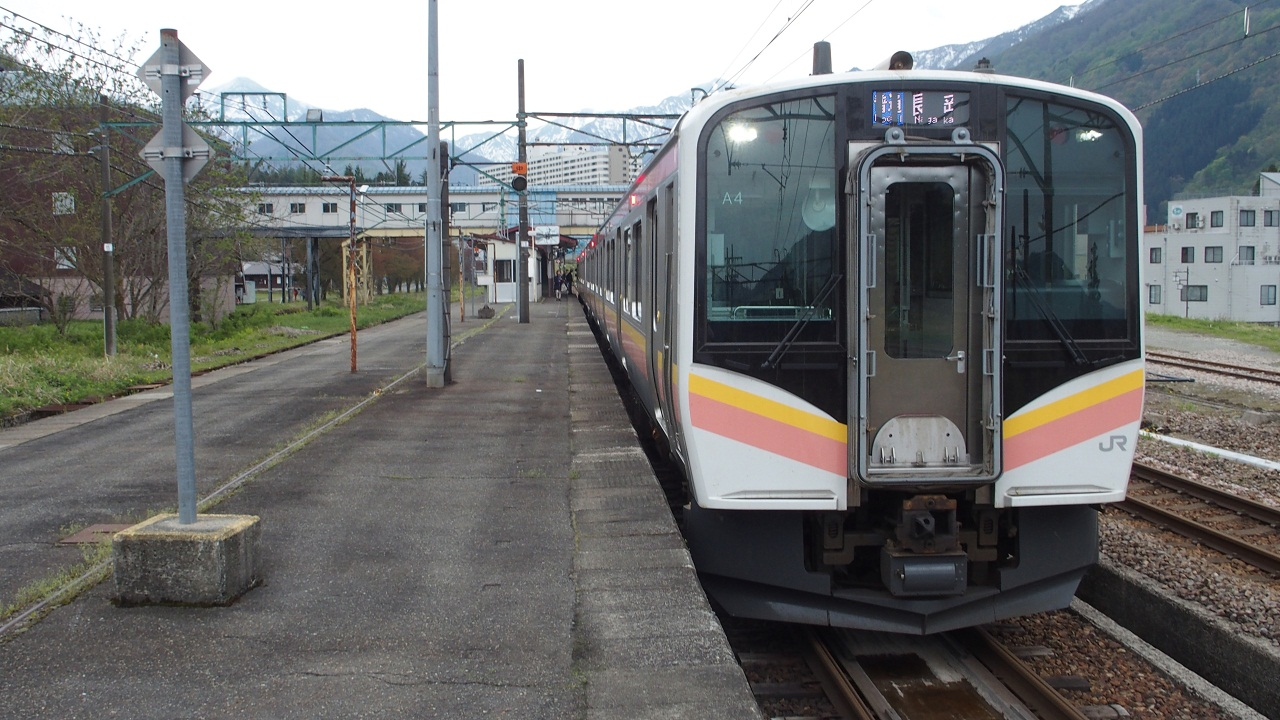
An E129 series EMU at Echigo-Nakazato Station in April 2016

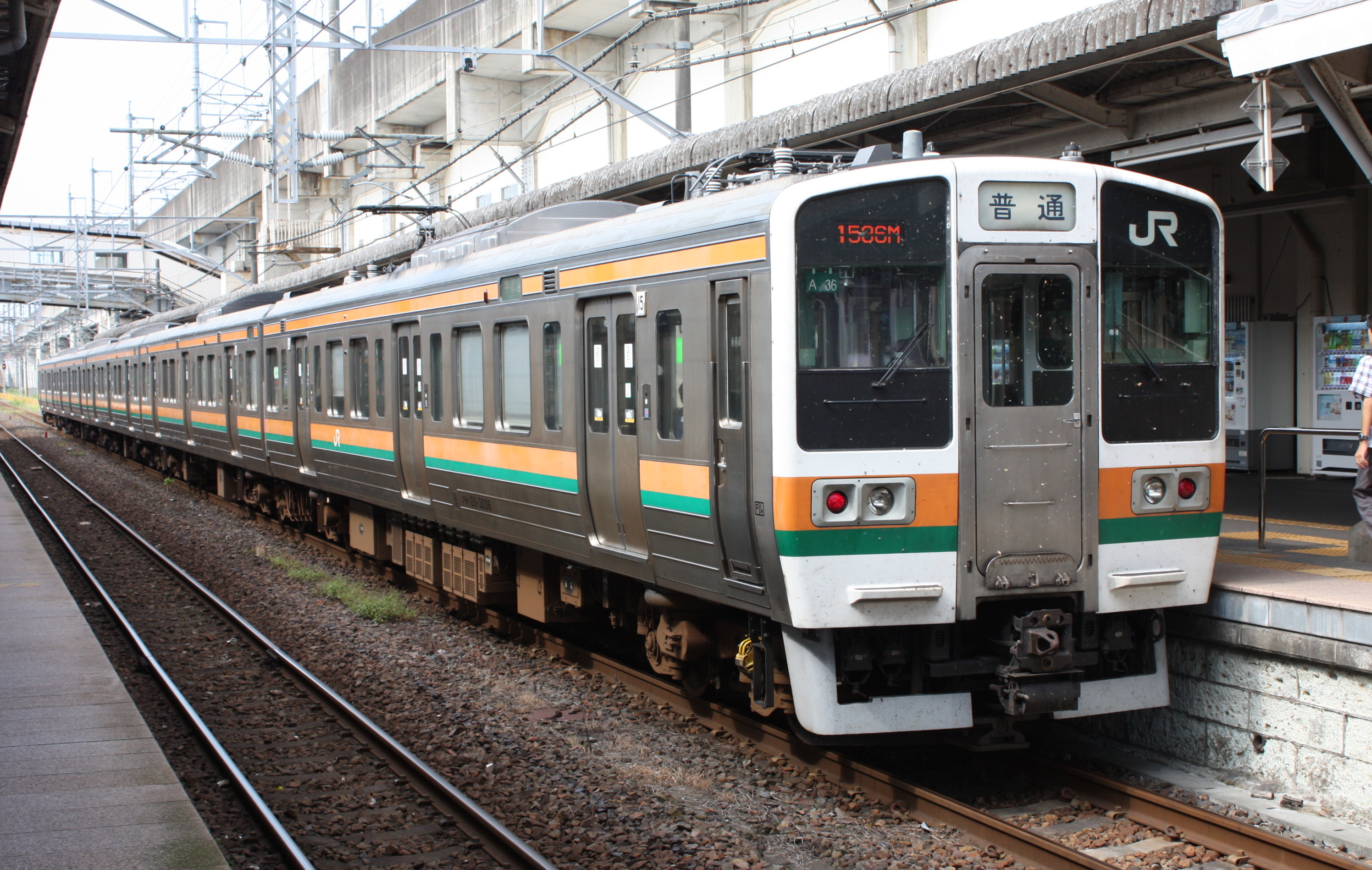
A 211-3000 series EMU

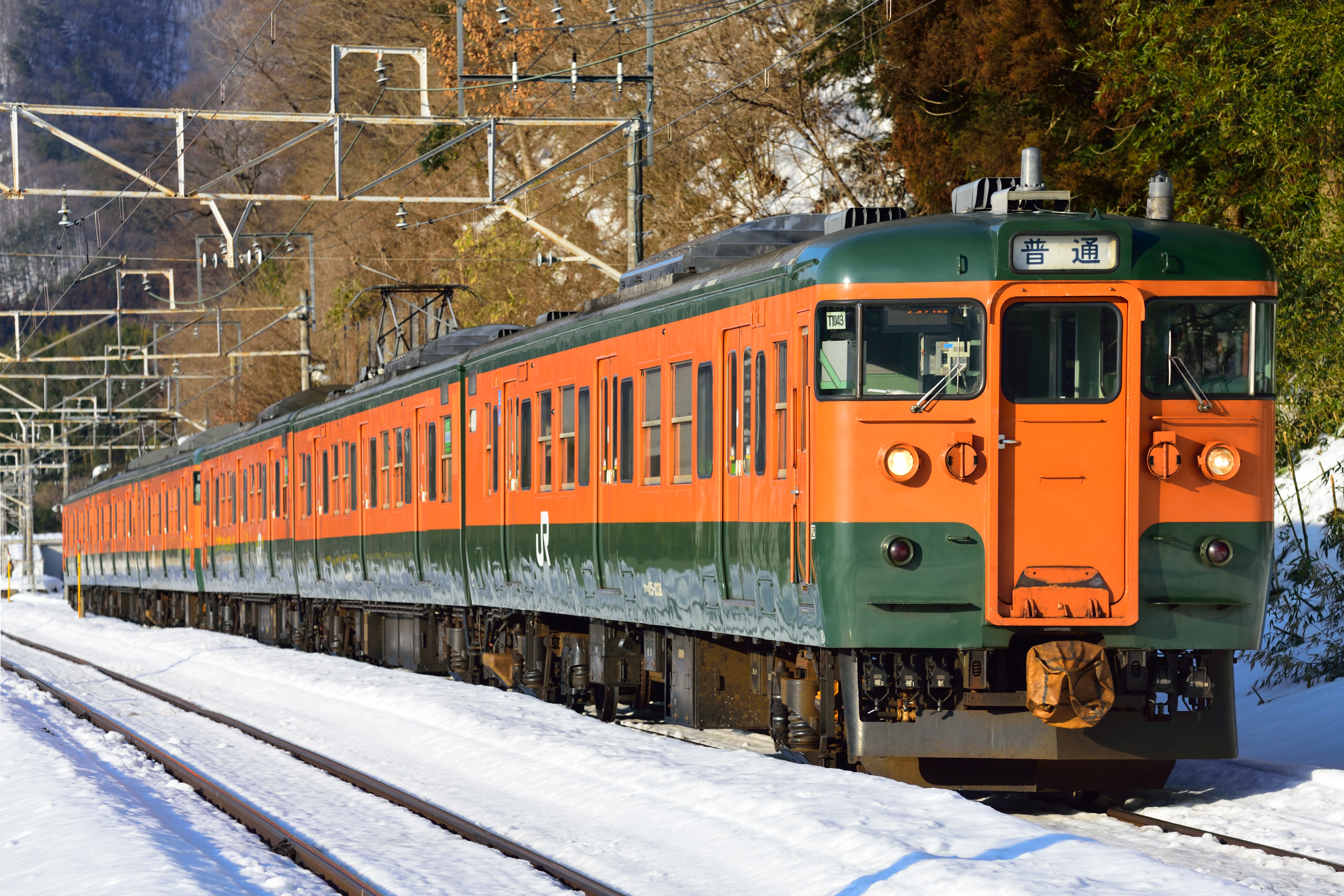
A 115 series EMU between Gokan Station and Kamimoku Station in February 2017

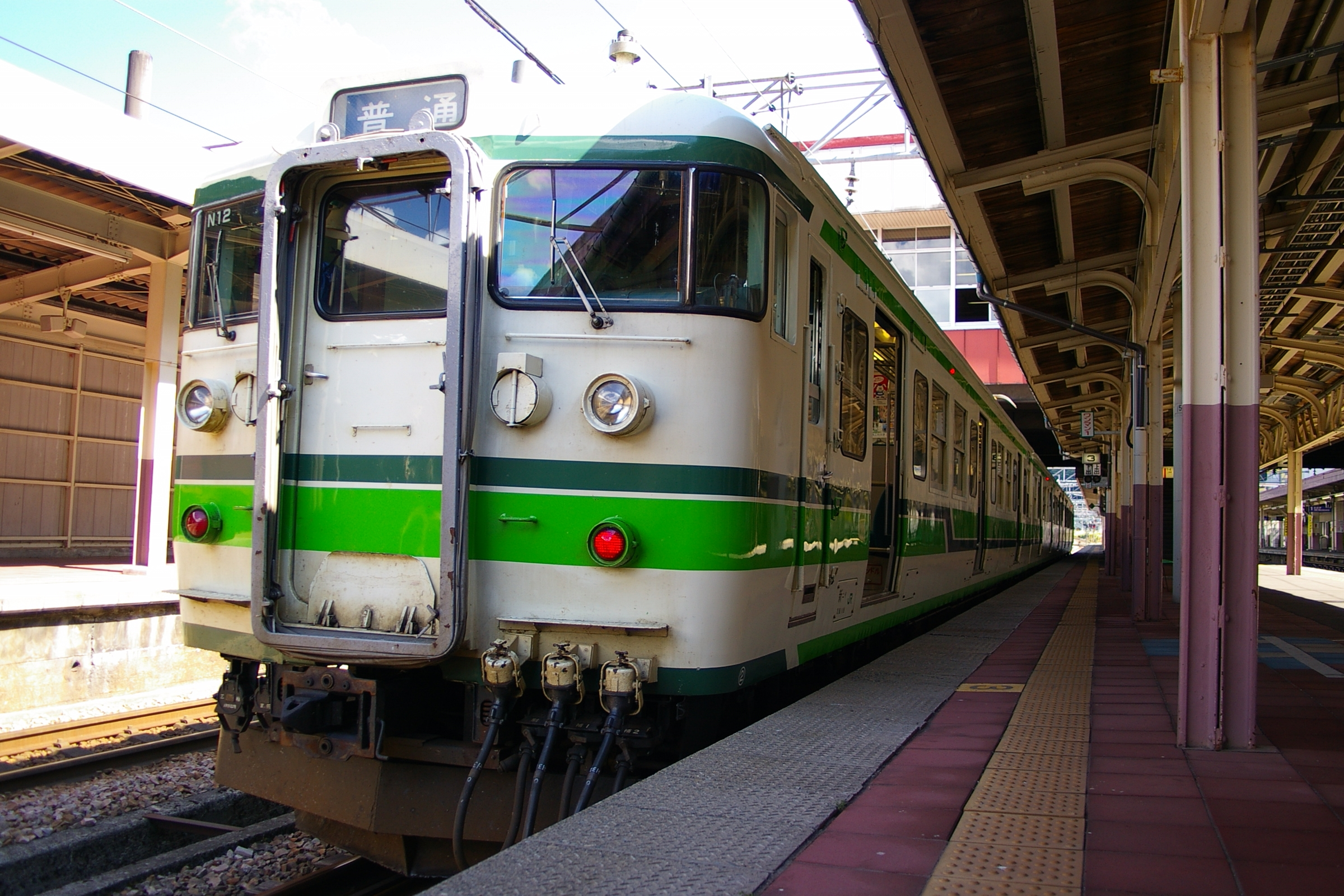
A 115 series EMU at Echigo-Yuzawa Station

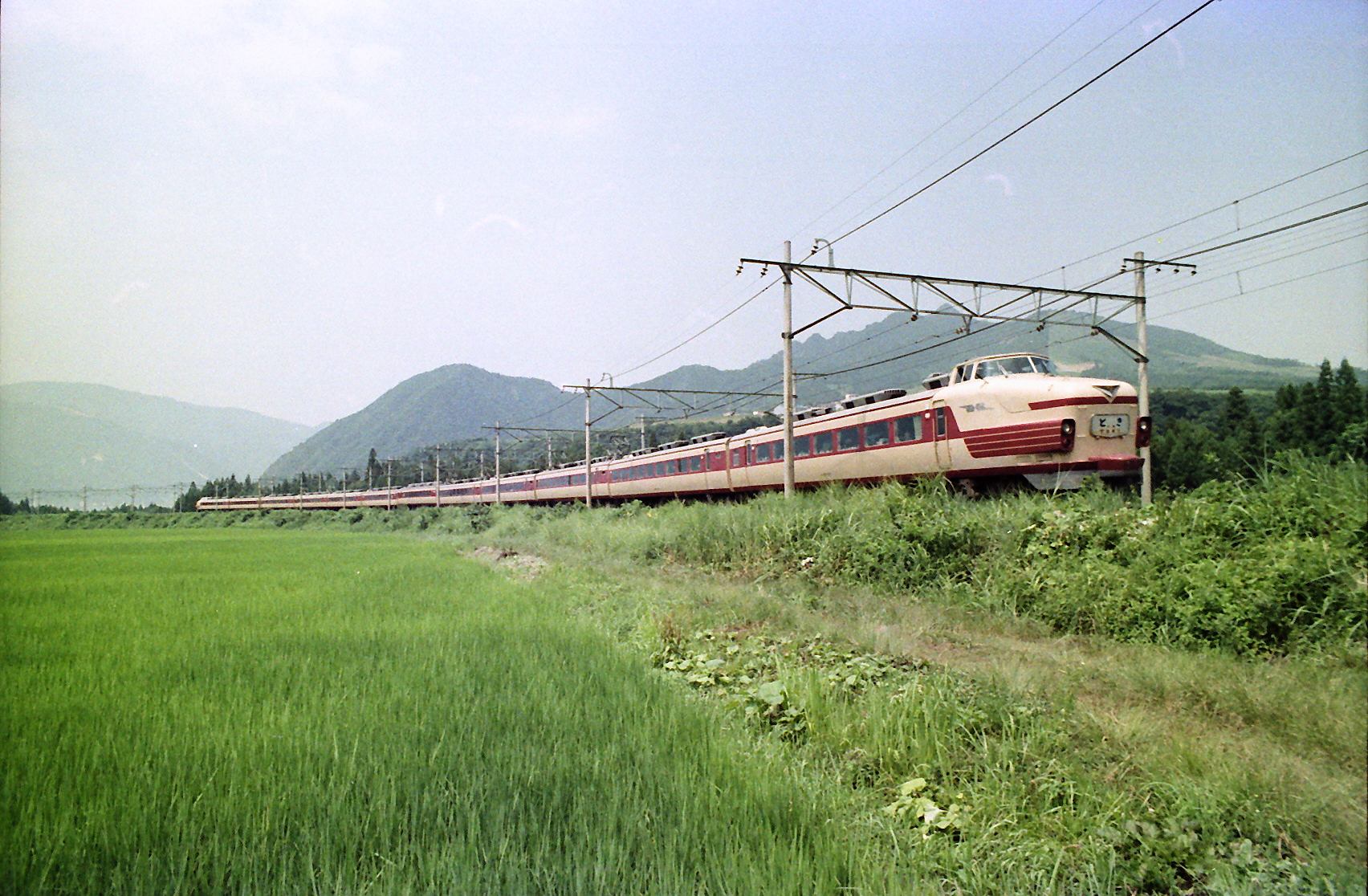
181 series Limited Express Toki (Echigo-Nakazato - Iwappara Skiing Ground, August 1978)

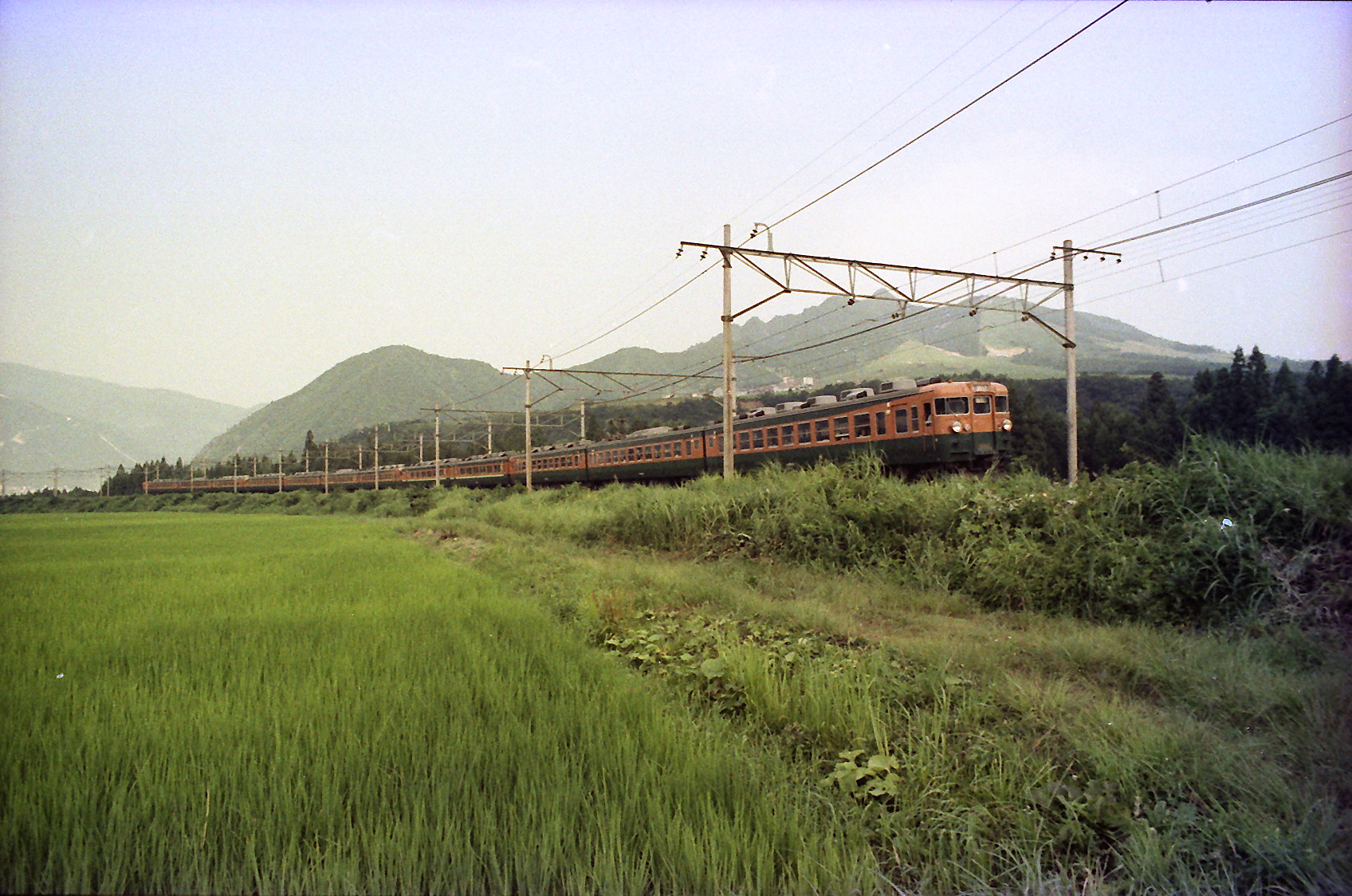
165 series Express Sado (Echigo-Nakazato - Iwappara Skiing Ground, August 1978)

== History ==
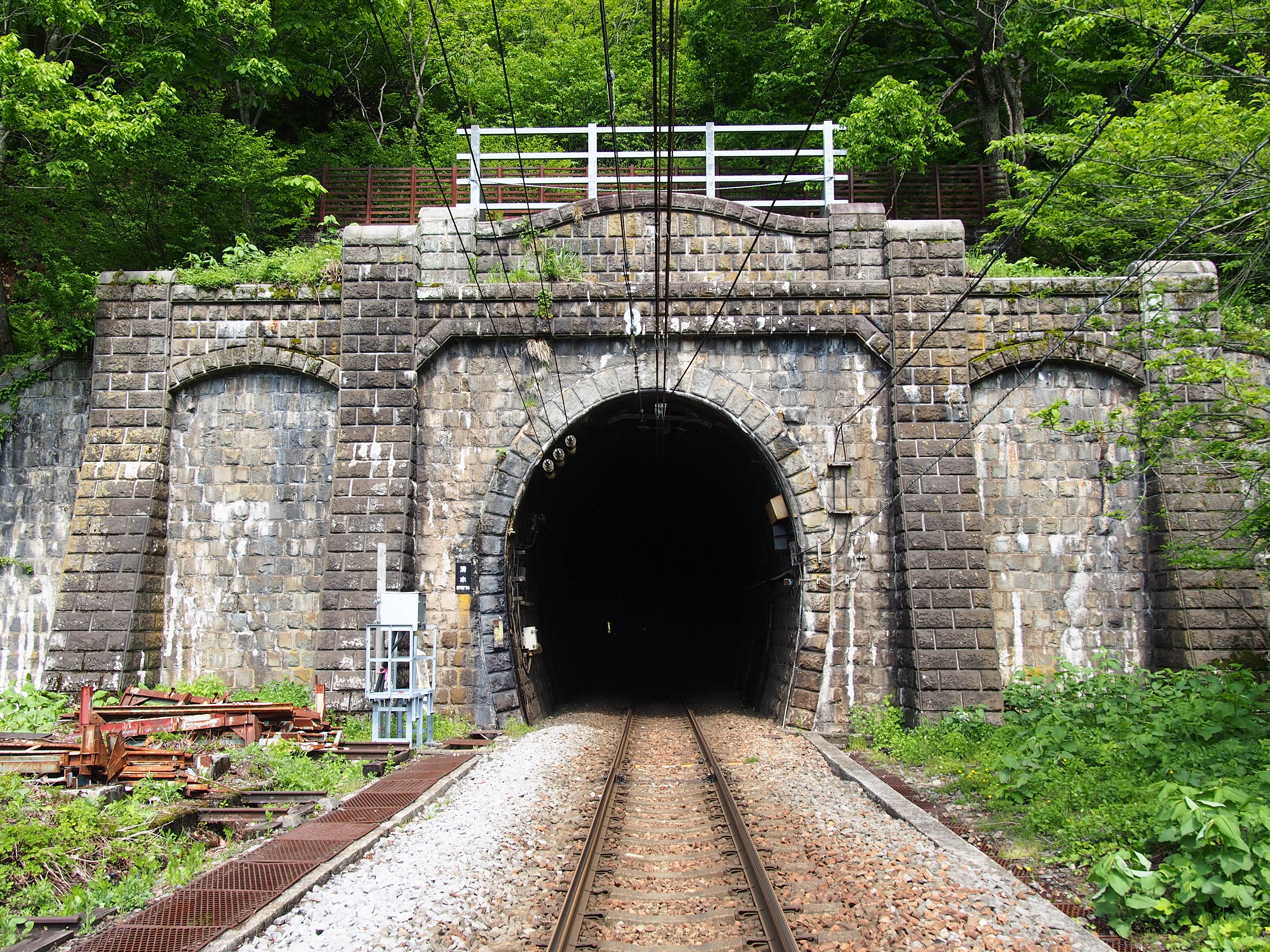
Shimizu Tunnel

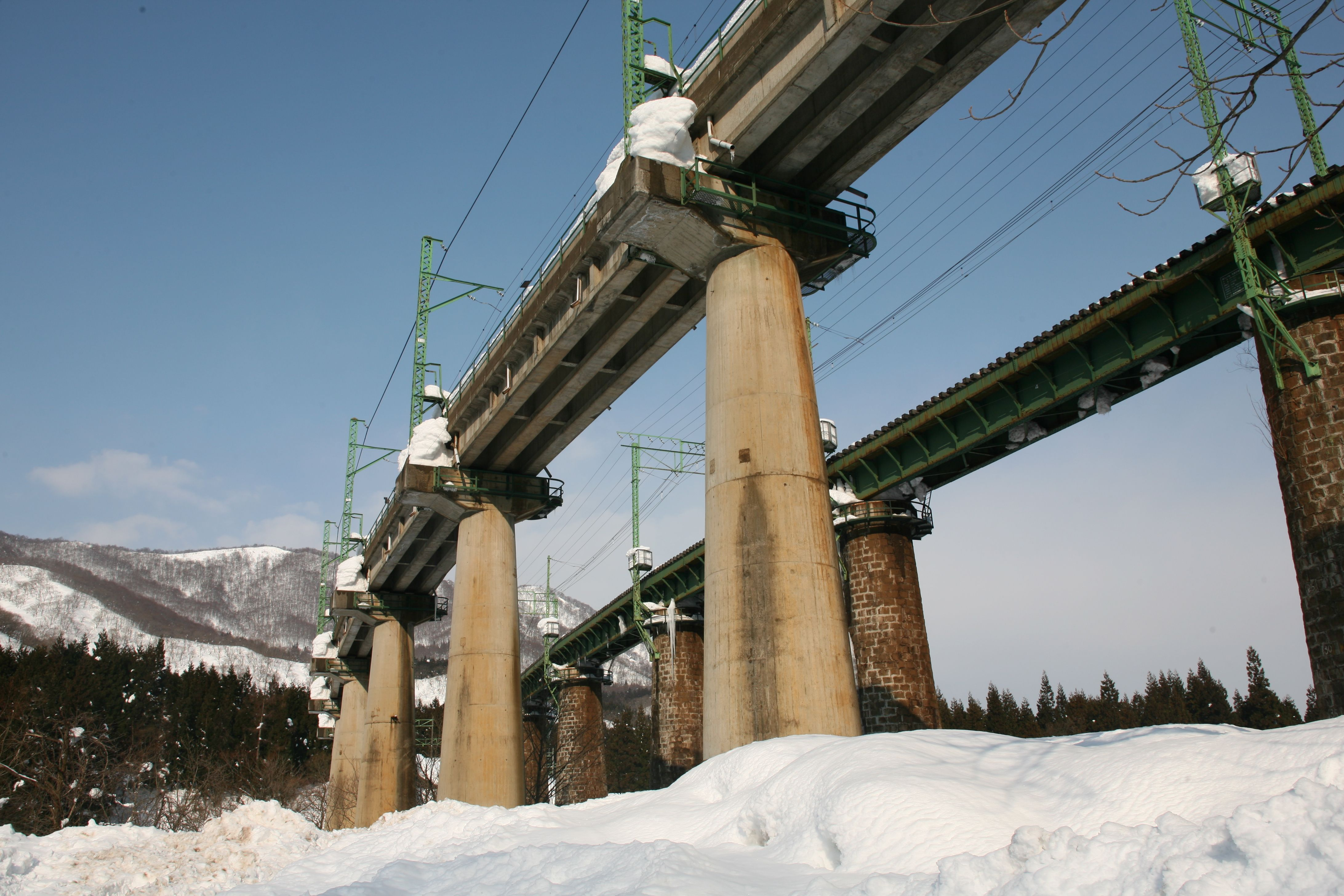
Kedosawa Bridge

The Nippon Railway opened the Takasaki to Maebashi (now Shin-Maebashi) section in 1884. The company was nationalised in 1906.

The first railway between Niigata and the east coast of Honshu was the Ban'etsu West Line, completed in 1914. In 1920, it was decided to build the Jōetsu Line as a more direct route between Tokyo and Niigata. The Miyauchi to Echigo-Yuzawa section opened in stages between 1920 and 1925, and the Shinmaebashi to Minakami section of the line opened in stages between 1921 and 1928.

In 1931, with the completion of the 9,702 m (31,830 ft 9 in) Shimizu tunnel, the Echigo-Yuzawa - Minakami section of the line opened, including electrification at 1,500 V DC between Echigo-Yuzawa and Ishiuchi. When completed, the line shortened the Ueno to Niigata route by 98 km (61 mi), and included two spiral sections in the tunnels.

In 1947, the Takasaki to Minakami and Ishiuchi to Miyauchi sections were electrified, making this one of the first non-urban JNR lines to be completely electrified.

The Takasaki to Shinmaebashi section was double-tracked in 1957, and the rest of the line was double-tracked between 1961 and 1967, the final section involving the construction of the 13,500 m (44,291 ft 4 in) Shin-Shimizu tunnel. Passengers catching Miyauchi-bound (northbound) trains at Yubiso and Doai stations do so from platforms situated underground within the Shin-Shimizu tunnel.

=== Service disruptions ===
The 2004 Chūetsu earthquake seriously damaged the Jōetsu Line, closing the Minakami to Miyauchi section for about two months. Single-line operation at speeds limited to 35–40 km/h (22–25 mph) then resumed, being raised to 45–65 km/h (28–40 mph) four months after the earthquake, and the second track reopened, also with speed restrictions, 5 months after the quake. Full service was restored 9 months after the line had first closed.

In late July 2011, torrential rainfall damage resulted in the closure of the Echigo-Yuzawa - Muikamachi section for two weeks.
