= Koide Station =

Railway station in Uonuma, Niigata Prefecture, Japan

Coordinates: 37°14′00″N 138°57′13″E

Koide Station 小出駅
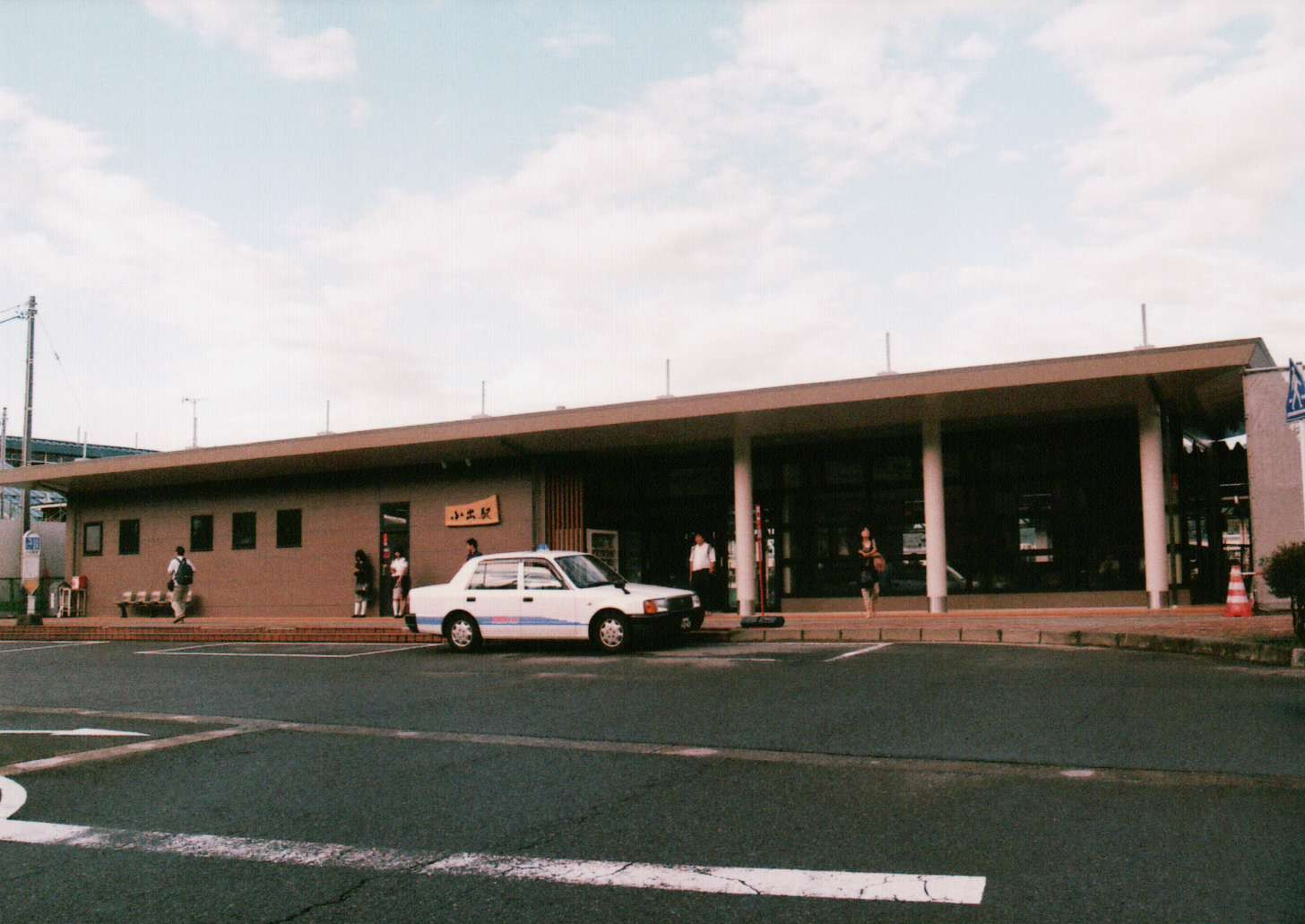
- Koide Station in May 2012

General information
- Location: 1315 Yokkamachi, Uonuma-shi, Niigata-ken; Japan
- Operator: JR East
- Lines: ■ Jōetsu Line; ■ Tadami Line
- Platforms: 1 side + 2 island platforms
- Tracks: 5

Other information
- Status: Staffed
- Website: Official website

History
- Opened: 1 September 1923; 102 years ago

Passengers
- FY2015: 940 daily

Services
Preceding station	JR East	Following station
Yairo towards Takasaki	Jōetsu Line	Echigo-Horinouchi towards Nagaoka
Terminus	Tadami Line	Yabukami towards Aizu-Wakamatsu
Location
- Location within JR Tadami Line Location within Japan

Koide Station (小出駅, Koide-eki) is a railway station in Uonuma, Niigata, Japan, operated by East Japan Railway Company (JR East).

== Lines ==
Koide Station is served by the Jōetsu Line, and is 132.2 kilometers from the terminus of the line at Takasaki. It is also the terminus of the Tadami Line, which is 135.2 kilometers from the opposite terminus at Aizu-Wakamatsu.

== Station layout ==
The station consists of one side platform and two island platforms serving five tracks. The platforms are connected by a footbridge. The station has a Midori no Madoguchi staffed ticket office.

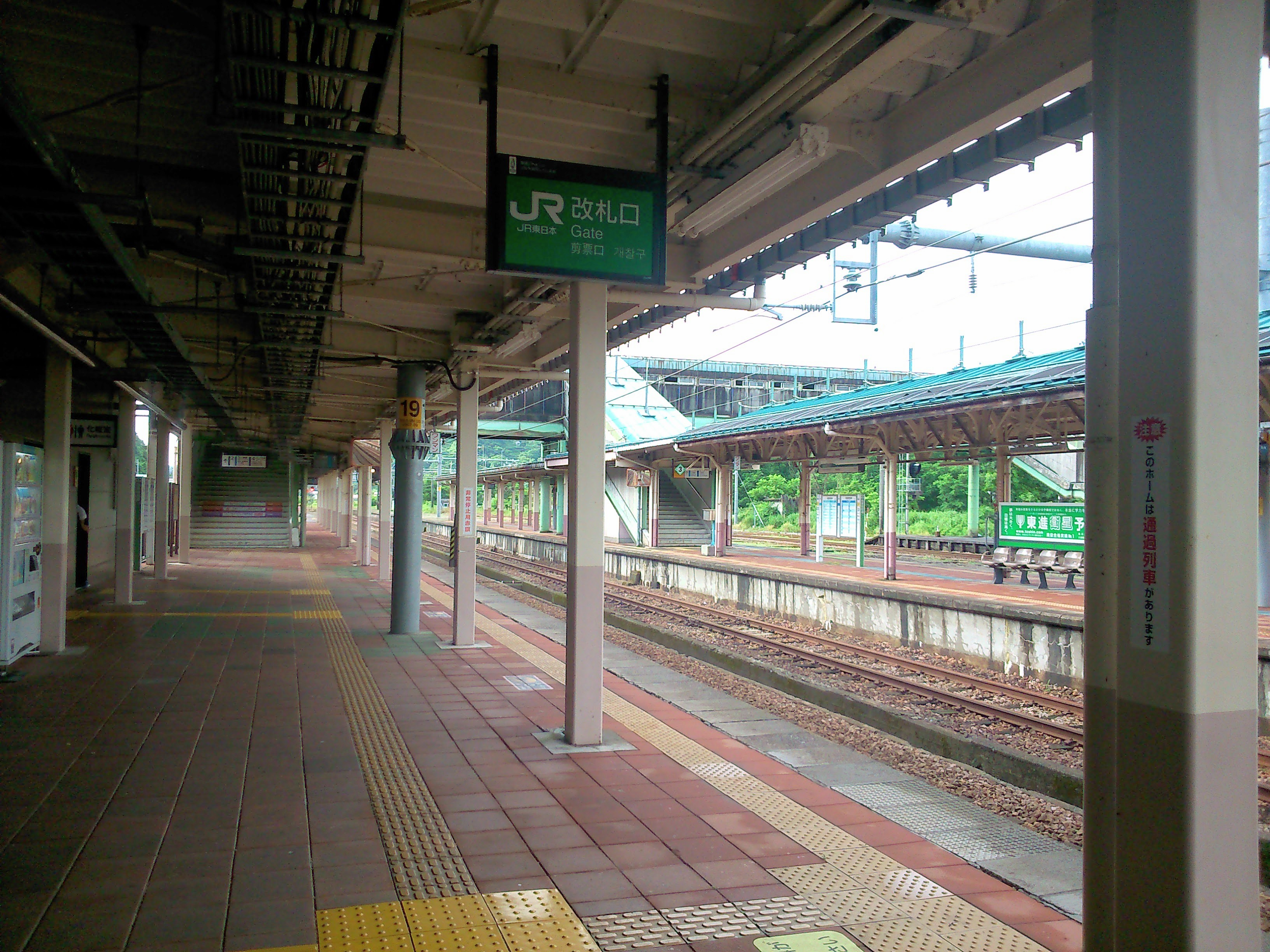
Platforms

=== Platforms ===
1	■ Jōetsu Line	for Nagaoka and Niigata
2	■ Jōetsu Line	(siding)
3	■ Jōetsu Line	for Urasa, Echigo-Yuzawa and Minakami
4	■ Tadami Line	for Ōshirakawa, Tadami and Aizu-Wakamatsu
5	■ Tadami Line	for Ōshirakawa, Tadami and Aizu-Wakamatsu

== History ==
The station opened on 1 September 1923 as an intermediate station on the Jōetsu Line. It became the western terminus of the western section of the Tadami Line extending to Oshirakawa, in 1942, and the western terminus of the completed line in 1971.

Following the privatization of Japanese National Railways (JNR) on 1 April 1987, the station came under the control of JR East.

== Passenger statistics ==
In fiscal 2015, the station was used by an average of 940 passengers daily (boarding passengers only).

== Surrounding area ==
- former Koide town hall
- Koide Post Office
- Koide High School
- Koide Middle School
- Koide Elementary School
- Japan National Route 17
- Japan National Route 352

== See also ==
- List of railway stations in Japan
