= Ishiuchi Station =

Railway station in Minamiuonuma, Niigata Prefecture, Japan

Ishiuchi Station 石打駅
- Ishiuchi Station, September 2021

General information
- Location: 1 Ueno, Minamiuonuma-shi, Niigata-ken 949-6373; Japan
- Coordinates: 36.9889°N 138.8041°E
- Operator: JR East
- Line: ■Jōetsu Line
- Distance: 100.6 km from Takasaki
- Platforms: 1 island platform
- Tracks: 2

Other information
- Status: Unstaffed
- Website: Official website

History
- Opened: 1 November 1925; 101 years ago

Passengers
- FY2017: 122 daily

Services
Preceding station	JR East	Following station
Echigo-Yuzawa towards Takasaki	Jōetsu Line	Ōsawa towards Nagaoka
Location
- Location within Japan

Ishiuchi Station (石打駅, Ishiuchi-eki) is a railway station on the Jōetsu Line in the city of Minamiuonuma, Niigata, Japan, operated by the East Japan Railway Company (JR East).

== Lines ==
Ishiuchi Station is a station on the Jōetsu Line, and is located 100.6 kilometers from the starting point of the line at Takasaki.

== Station layout ==
The station has a single elevated island platform connected to a two-story station building on its second floor. The station previously also had a side platform for use seasonally, which accounts for the odd platform numbering.

=== Platforms ===
2	■ Jōetsu Line	for Minakami, Echigo-Yuzawa
3	■ Jōetsu Line	for Nagaoka, Niigata

== History ==
Ishiuchi Station opened on 1 November 1925. Upon the privatization of the Japanese National Railways (JNR) on 1 April 1987, it came under the control of JR East.

== Passenger statistics ==
In fiscal 2017, the station was used by an average of 122 passengers daily (boarding passengers only).

== Surrounding area ==
- Ishiuchi Maruyama Ski Resort
- Ishiuchi Hanaoka Ski Resort

== See also ==
- List of railway stations in Japan
