= Urasa Station =

Railway station in Minamiuonuma, Niigata Prefecture, Japan

Coordinates: 37.167152°N 138.922619°E

Urasa Station 浦佐駅
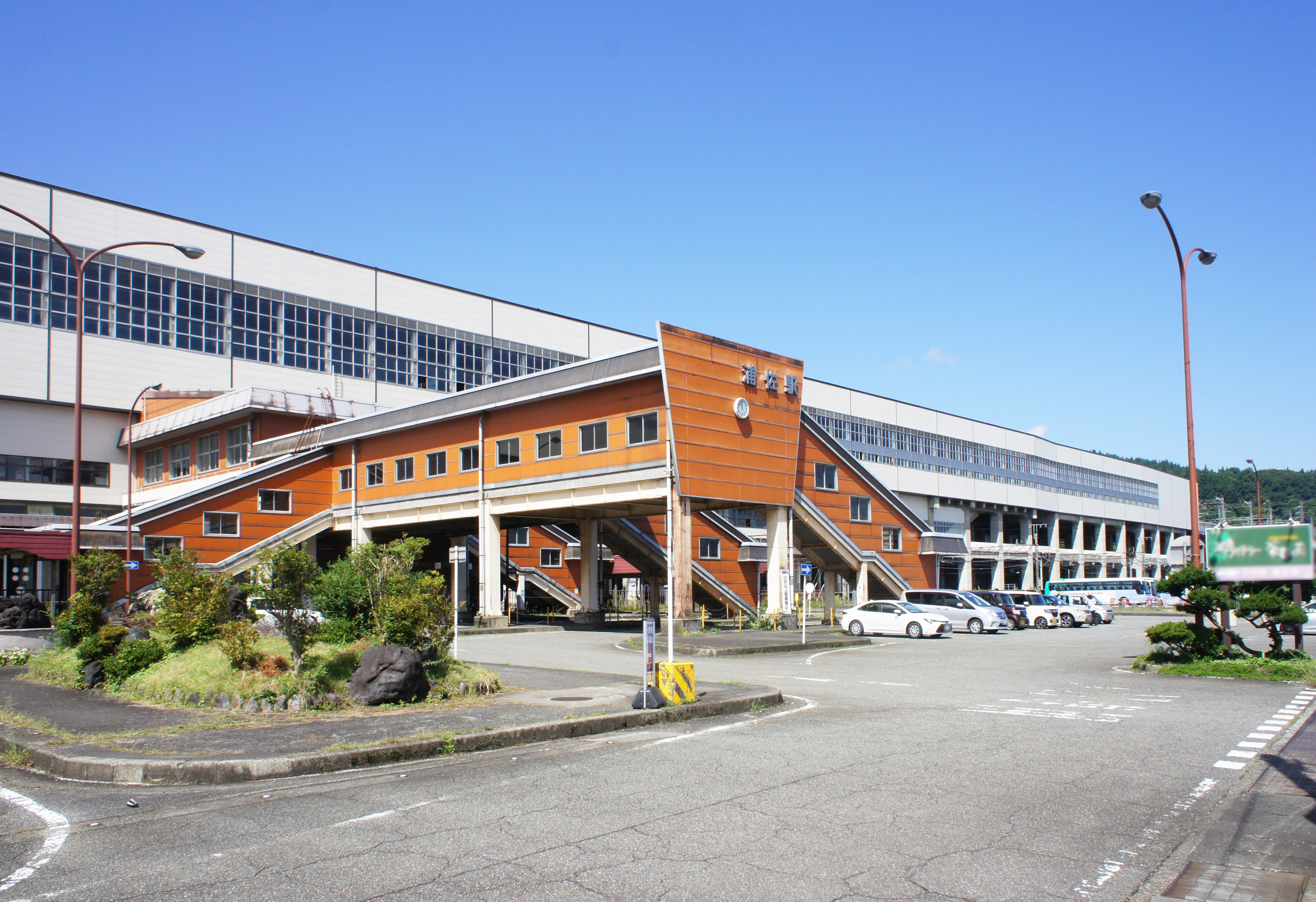
- Urasa Station East Entrance in September 2021

General information
- Location: 719-2 Minamiuonuma-shi, Niigata-ken; Japan
- Operator: JR East
- Lines: Jōetsu Shinkansen; Jōetsu Line
- Platforms: 2 side platforms (Shinkansen); 2 island platforms (conventional line)
- Tracks: 6

Construction
- Structure type: Elevated (Shinkansen); At grade (conventional line)

Other information
- Website: www.jreast.co.jp/estation/station/info.aspx?StationCd=257

History
- Opened: 1 September 1923; 103 years ago

Passengers
- FY2015: 1,444 (daily)

Services
Preceding station	JR East	Following station
Echigo-Yuzawa towards Tokyo	Jōetsu Shinkansen Toki	Nagaoka towards Niigata
Itsukamachi towards Takasaki	Jōetsu Line	Yairo towards Nagaoka
Location
- Location within Niigata Prefecture Location within Japan

Urasa Station (浦佐駅, Urasa-eki) is a railway station in Minamiuonuma, Niigata, Japan, operated by the East Japan Railway Company (JR East).

== Lines ==
Urasa Station is a station on the Joetsu Shinkansen high-speed line and also the Joetsu Line. It is located 123.9 kilometers from the starting point of the Joetsu Line at Takasaki and 198.6 kilometers from Ōmiya.

== Station layout ==
The station has a two island platforms serving the local Joetsu Line and two elevated opposed side platforms serving the Joetsu Shinkansen. The station has a Reserved Seat Ticket Vending Machine with the capability to call an operator to purchase tickets (話せる指定席券売機, hanaseru shiteiseki kenbaiki).

=== Platforms ===
1	■ Joetsu Line	for Nagaoka and Niigata
2/3	■ Joetsu Line	(not normally used)
4	■ Joetsu Line	for Echigo-Yuzawa and Minakami
11	■ Joetsu Shinkansen	for Nagaoka and Niigata
12	■ Joetsu Shinkansen	for Echigo-Yuzawa and Tokyo

== History ==
Urasa Station opened on 1 September 1923. Shinkansen operations commenced from 15 November 1982. Upon the privatization of the Japanese National Railways (JNR) on 1 April 1987, it came under the control of JR East.

== Passenger statistics ==
In fiscal 2015, the station was used by an average of 1,444 passengers daily (boarding passengers only).

== Surrounding area ==
- International University of Japan
- National Route 17
- Urasa Ski Resort

== See also ==
- List of railway stations in Japan
