= Nagaoka Station =

Railway station in Nagaoka, Niigata Prefecture, Japan

Nagaoka Station 長岡駅
- Nagaoka Station

General information
- Location: 2-794-4 Jōnai-cho, Nagaoka-shi, Niigata-ken 940-0061; Japan
- Coordinates: 37.447321°N 138.854195°E
- Operator: JR East
- Lines: Jōetsu Shinkansen; Shin'etsu Main Line; Jōetsu Line
- Platforms: 2 island + 2 side platforms

Other information
- Status: Staffed (Midori no Madoguchi )
- Website: Official website

History
- Opened: 16 June 1898; 128 years ago

Passengers
- FY2017: 11,694

Services
Preceding station	JR East	Following station
Urasa towards Tokyo	Jōetsu Shinkansen Toki	Tsubame-Sanjō towards Niigata
Kashiwazaki towards Naoetsu	Shirayuki	Mitsuke towards Niigata
Miyauchi towards Naoetsu	Shin'etsu Main Line Rapid	Kameda towards Niigata
Miyauchi towards Naoetsu	Shin'etsu Main Line Local	Kita-Nagaoka towards Niigata
Miyauchi towards Takasaki	Jōetsu Line	Terminus
Location
- Location within JR Shinetsu Main Line Location within Niigata Prefecture Location within Japan

Nagaoka Station (長岡駅, Nagaoka-eki) is a railway station in the city of Nagaoka, Niigata, Japan, operated by East Japan Railway Company (JR East). The station is located 270.6 kilometers from Tokyo.

== Lines ==
Nagaoka Station is served by the following lines:

- Joetsu Shinkansen
- Shinetsu Main Line
- Joetsu Line

== Station layout ==
The station has two ground-level island platforms for normal trains. However, Track 1 is not used by any regularly scheduled trains and it is normally closed off to passengers.

There are two elevated opposed side platforms for the Joetsu Shinkansen, with two through tracks in the middle. The Shinkansen platforms, constructed under the tenets of the 1973 Basic Plan to build out the high-speed network, were designed to be converted to island platforms to interface with the Uetsu Shinkansen, which was planned to run alongside the Joetsu Shinkansen between Nagaoka and Niigata. The opposite side of Track 11's platform is fenced, with a trackless railbed reserved for this purpose, and there is space reserved outside the station structure to allow the construction of a railbed for a track adjoining the platform for Track 12. As of 2016, however, there are no plans to revisit the "Uetsu Shinkansen".

The station building is located above the local platforms and underneath the Shinkansen platforms. The station has a Midori no Madoguchi staffed ticket office.

=== Platforms ===
1	■ Shin'etsu Main Line	(through traffic only)
2	■ Shin'etsu Line	for Higashi-Sanjō, Niigata
3/4/5	■ Shin'etsu Main Line	for Higashi-Sanjō Naoetsu for Kashiwazaki, Naoetsu
3/4/5	■ Jōetsu Line	for Echigo-Yuzawa, Minakami

11	■ Jōetsu Shinkansen	for Niigata
12	■ Jōetsu Shinkansen	Tokyo

== History ==
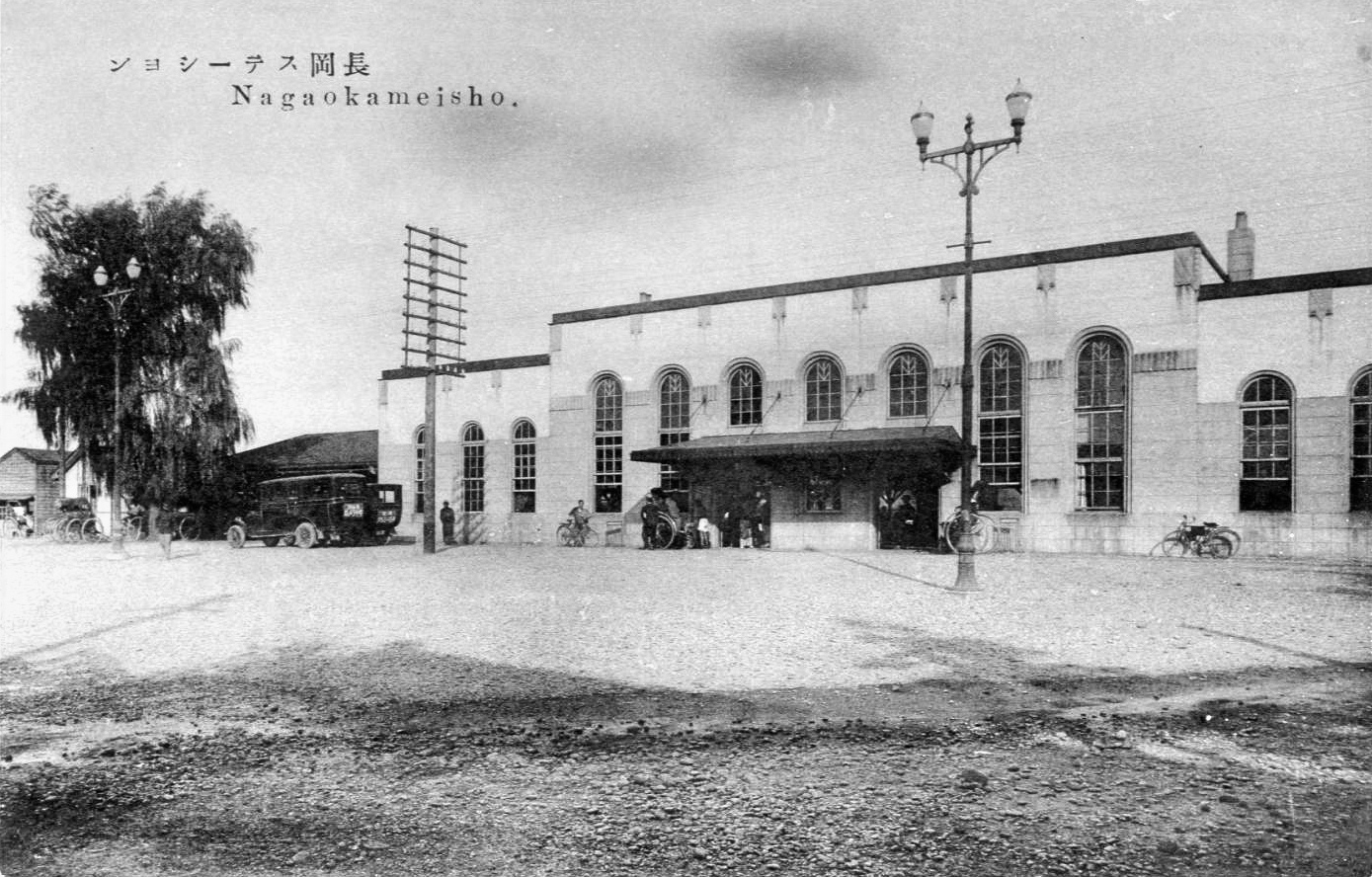
Nagaoka Station Early Showa era

Nagaoka Station opened on 16 June 1898. With the privatization of Japanese National Railways (JNR) on 1 April 1987, the station came under the control of JR East.

== Passenger statistics ==
In fiscal 2017, the station was used by an average of 11,694 passengers daily (boarding passengers only).

== Gallery ==
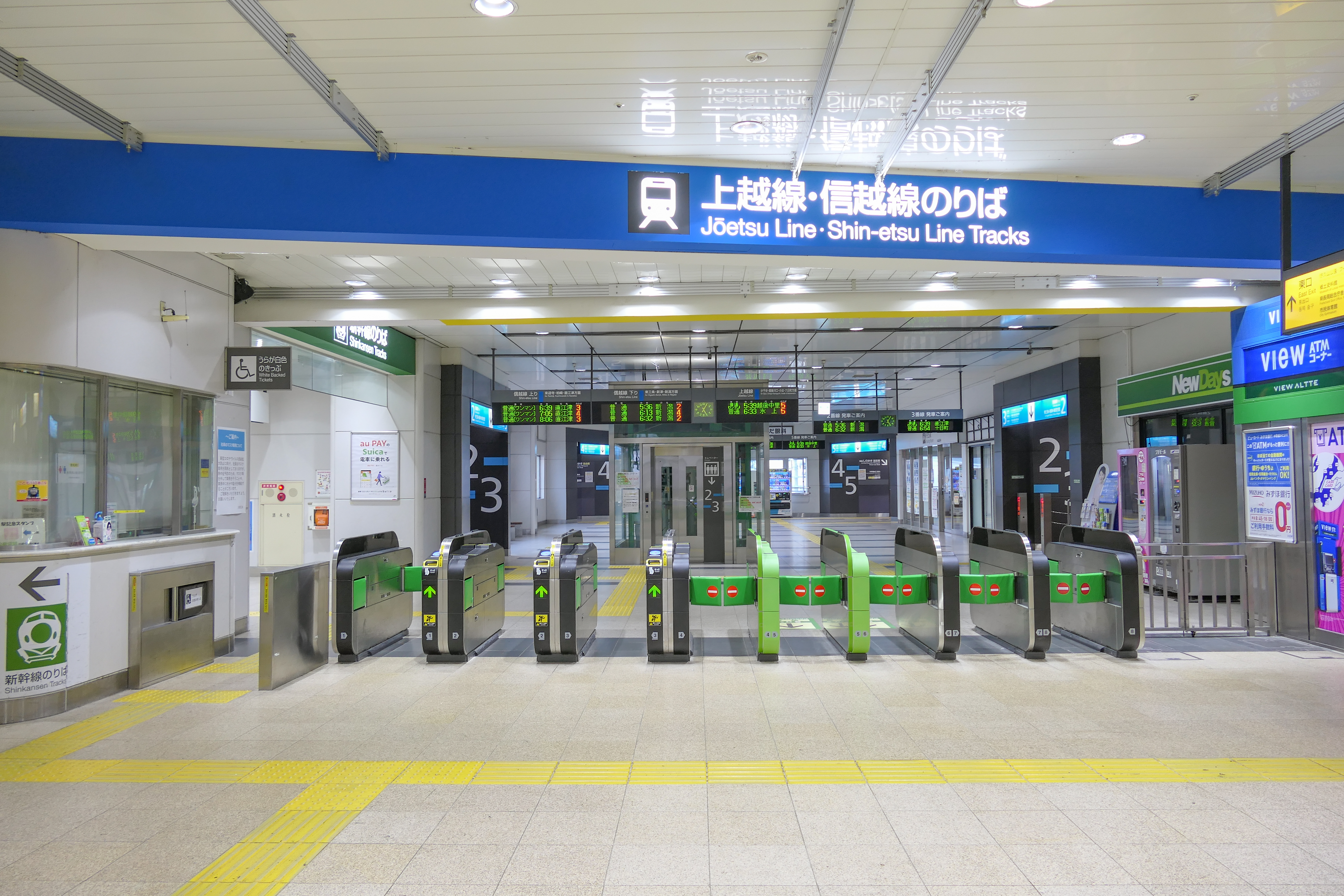
Gate (for Joetsu Line and Shin'etsu Line)

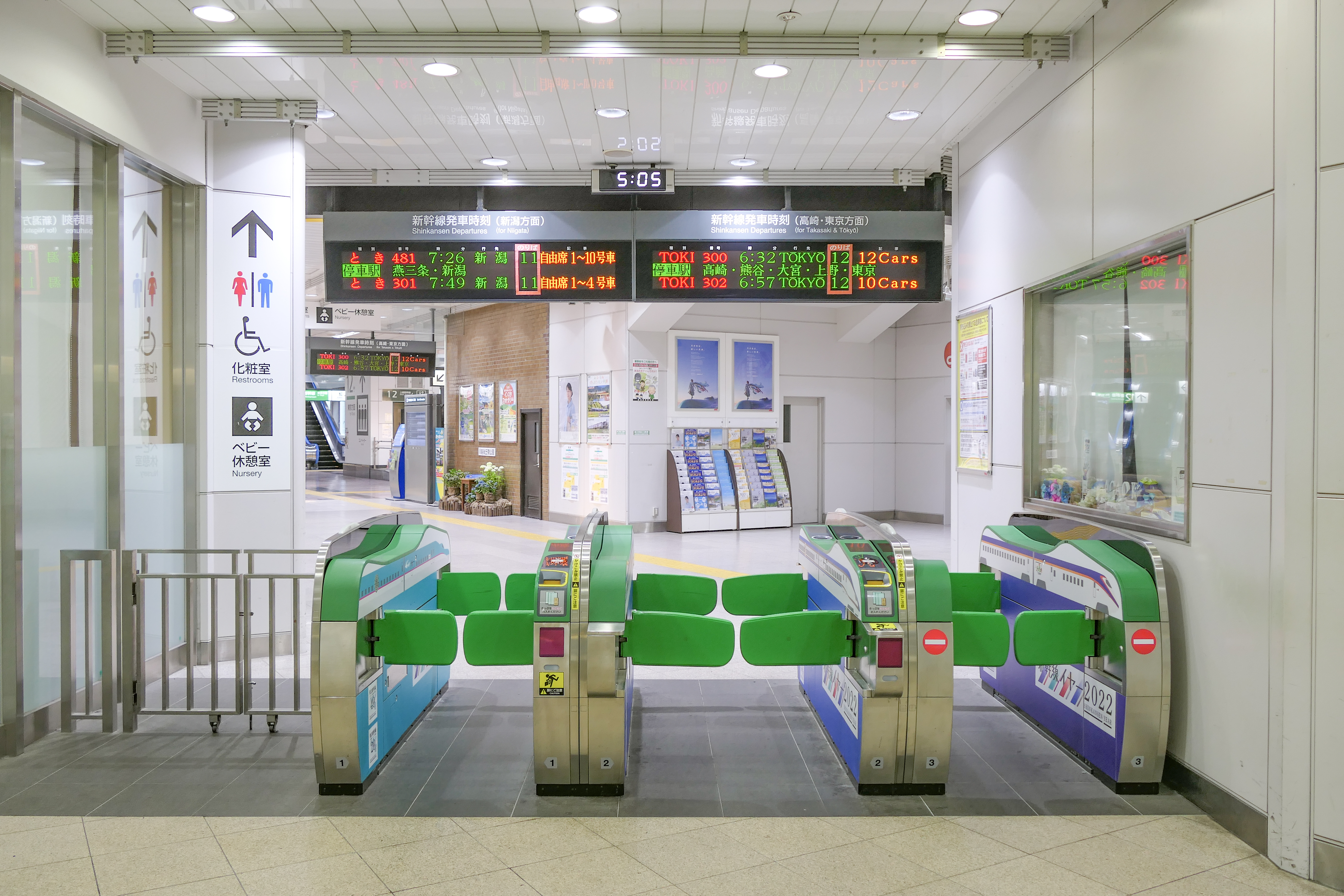
Gate (for Shinkansen)

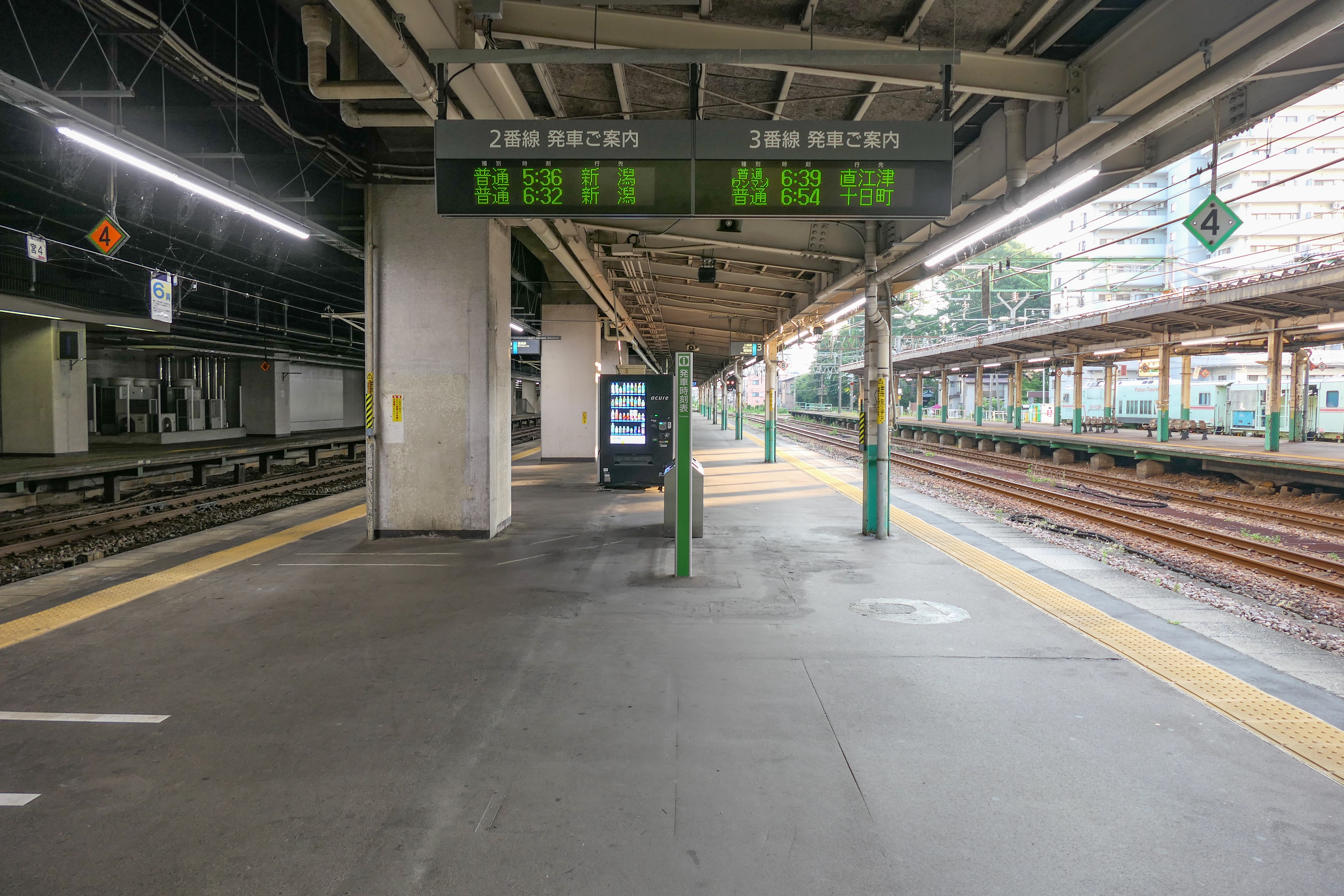
Shin'etsu Line platforms

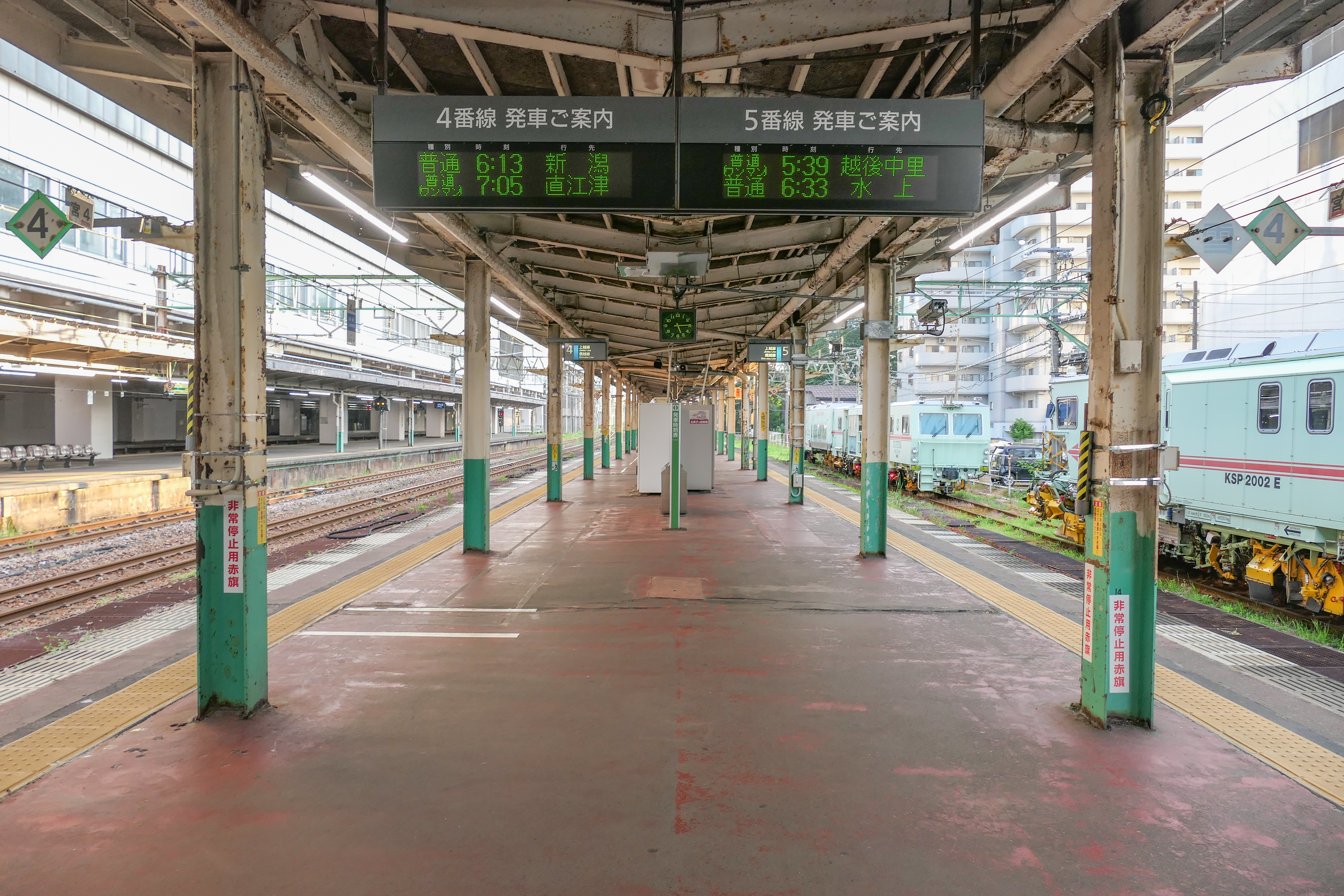
Jōetsu Line platforms

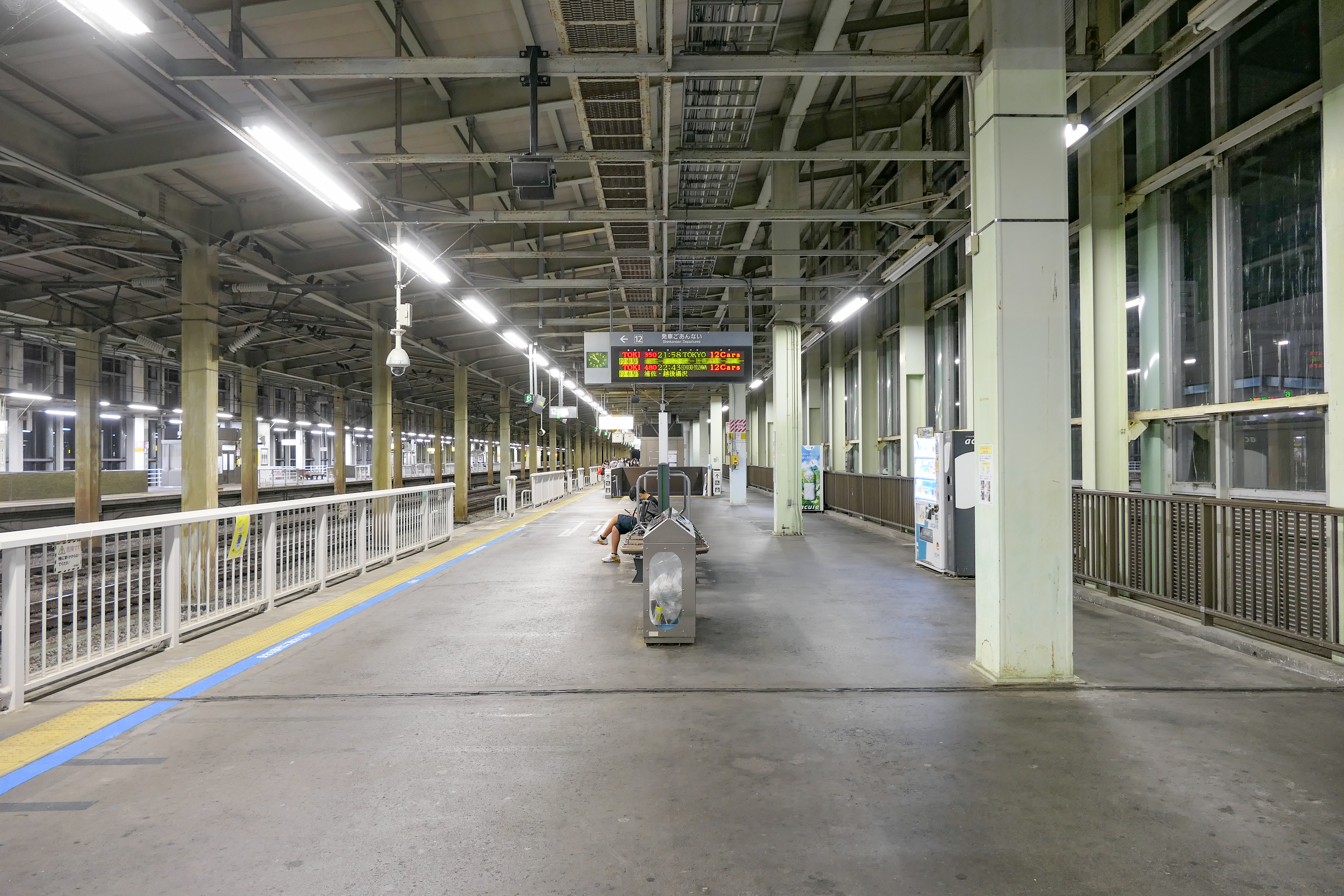
Shinkansen platform

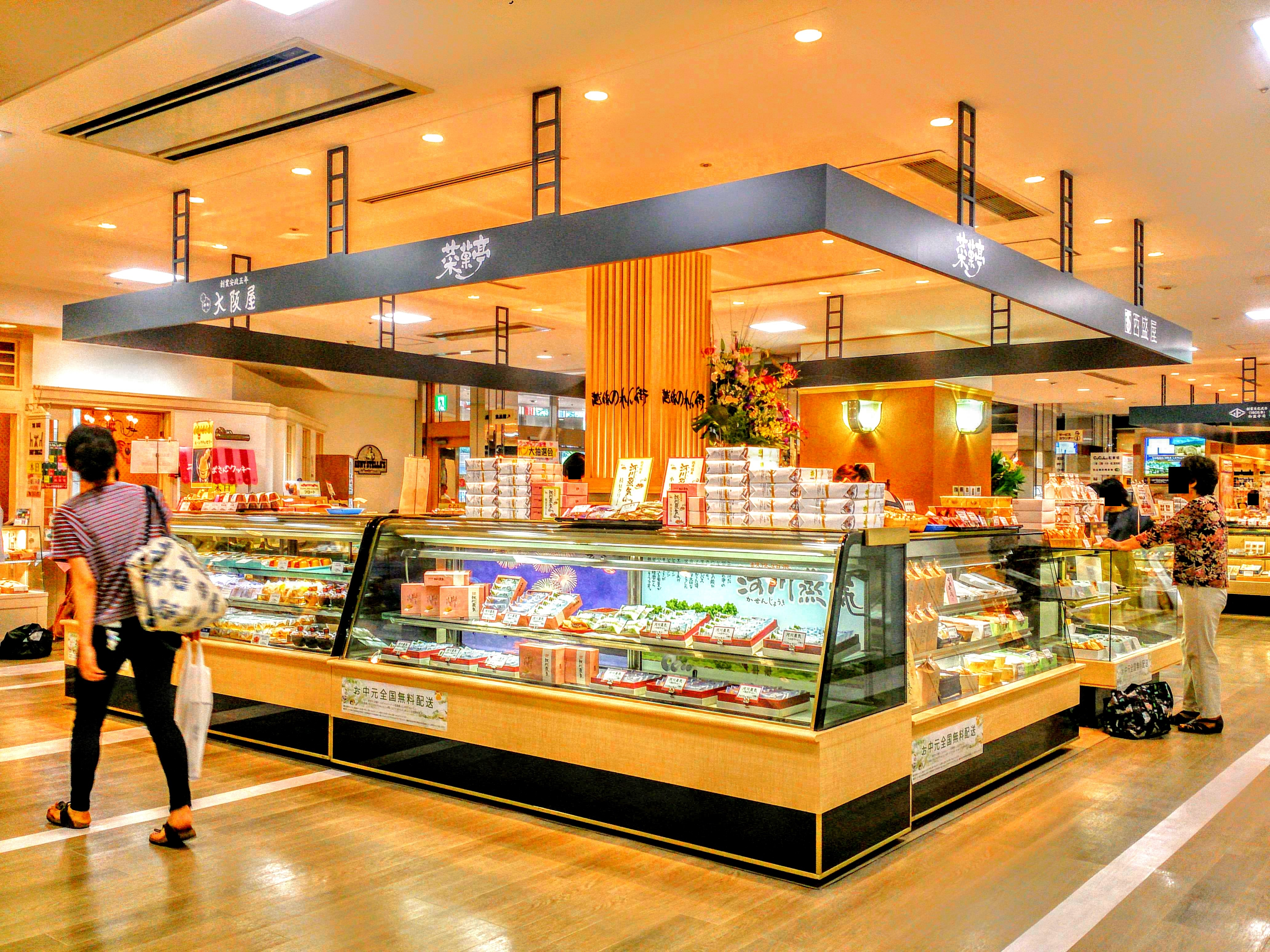
There are many shops and restaurants in the station building

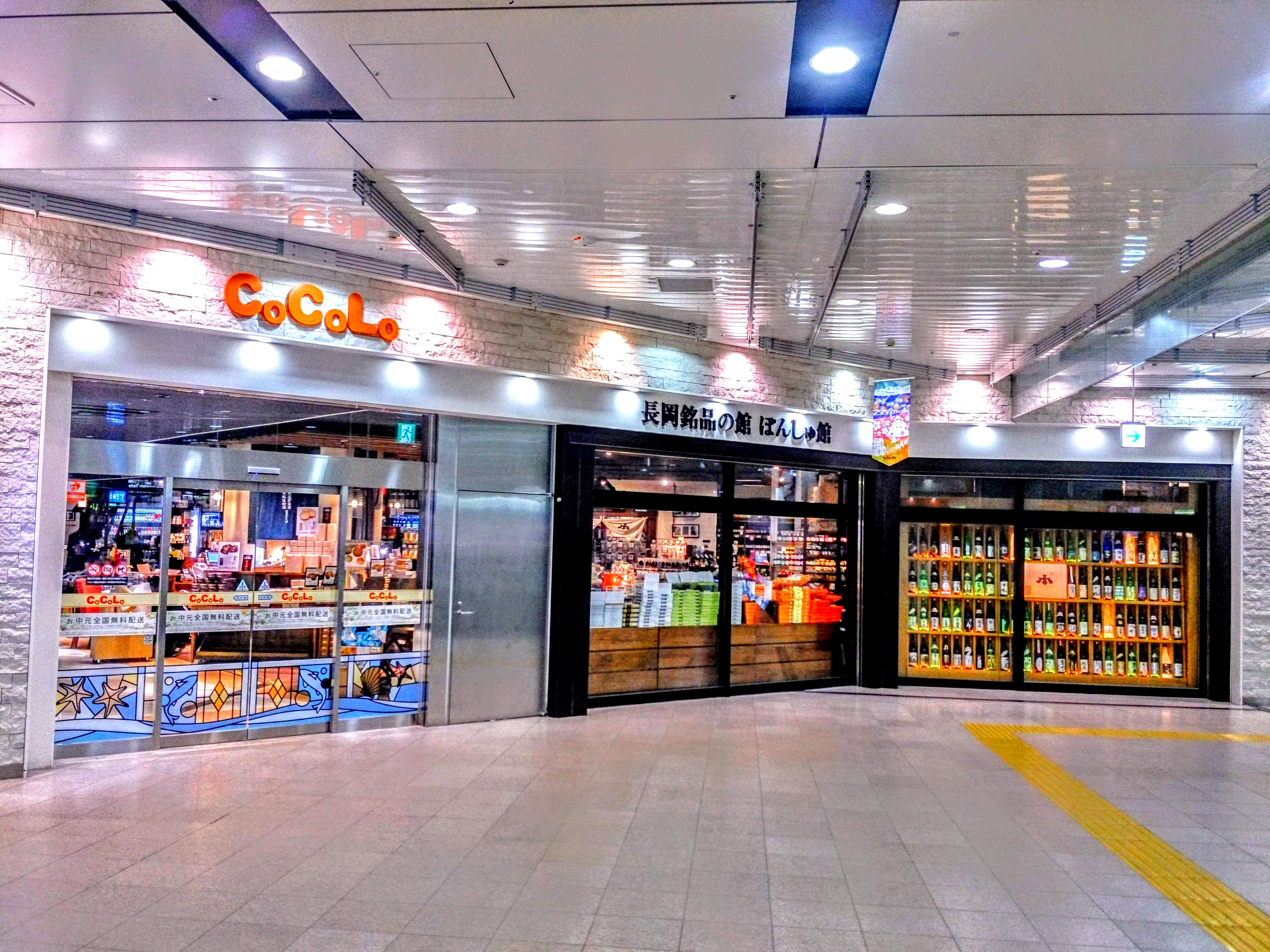
Sake Museum Ponshu-kan Nagaoka
