= Snoh Aalegra discography =

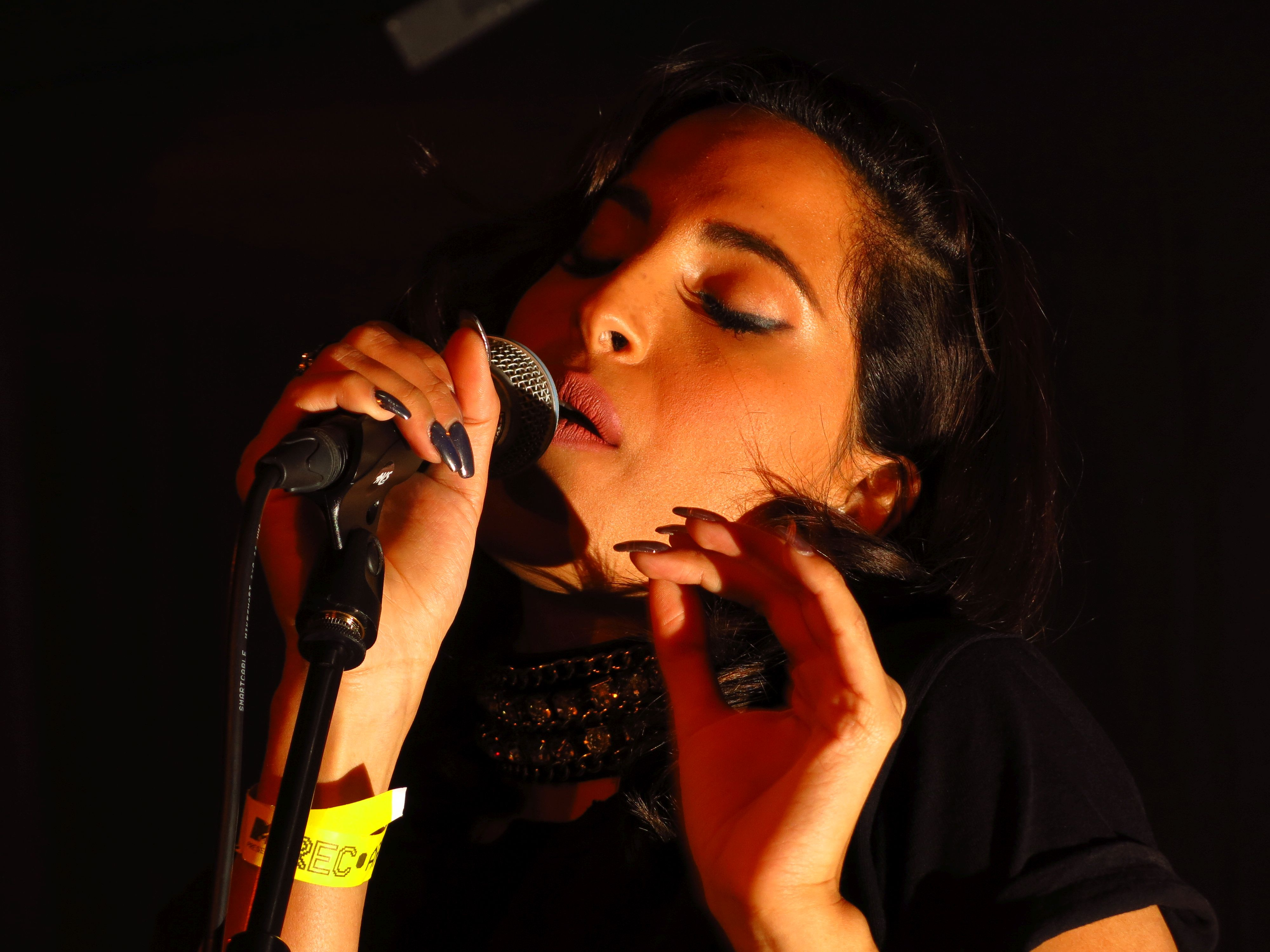
- Studio albums: 4
- EPs: 2

The discography of Swedish singer Snoh Aalegra.

== Studio albums ==
Title	Details	Peak chart positions					
Title	Details	SWE	CAN	UK	US	US R&B /HH	US R&B
First Sign (as Sheri)	Released: 6 April 2010; Labels: Mamia, Universal Music Sweden; Formats: CD, digital download	—	—	—	—	—	—
Feels	Released: 20 October 2017; Labels: ARTium; Formats: digital download, streaming	—	—	—	—	—	—
Ugh, Those Feels Again	Released: 16 August 2019; Labels: ARTium; Formats: LP, digital download, streaming	—	100	—	73	39	6
Temporary Highs in the Violet Skies	Released: 9 July 2021; Labels: ARTium, Roc Nation; Formats: LP, CD, digital download, streaming	45	57	77	24	16	3
"—" denotes a recording that did not chart or was not released in that territory.

== EPs ==
Title	Details
There Will Be Sunshine	Released: 17 November 2014; Labels: Epic, Sony Music; Formats: CD, digital download
Don't Explain	Released: 8 April 2016; Labels: ARTium; Formats: CD, digital download

== Singles ==
Title	Year	Peak chart positions					Album
Title	Year	NZ Hot	US Bub.	US R&B	US R&B/HH Airplay	US Adult R&B	Album
"Bad Things" (featuring Common)	2014	—	—	—	—	—	There Will Be Sunshine
"Emotional"	2015	—	—	—	—	—	Non-album single
"In Your River"	2016	—	—	—	—	—	Don't Explain
"Under the Influence"	2016	—	—	—	—	—	Don't Explain
"Feels"	2017	—	—	—	—	—	Feels
"Nothing Burns Like the Cold" (featuring Vince Staples)	2017	—	—	—	—	—	Feels
"Time"	2017	—	—	—	—	—	Feels
"Fool for You"	2017	—	—	—	—	—	Feels
"Sometimes" (featuring Logic)	2017	—	—	—	—	—	Feels
"Home (Remix)" (featuring Logic)	2017	—	—	—	—	—	Non-album singles
"Out of Your Way" (featuring Luke James)	2018	—	—	—	—	—	Non-album singles
"I Want You Around" (solo or featuring 6lack)	2019	—	23	21	13	1	Ugh, Those Feels Again
"You"	2019	—	—	—	—	—	Ugh, Those Feels Again
"Find Someone Like You"	2019	—	—	—	—	—	Ugh, Those Feels Again
"Situationship"	2019	—	—	—	—	—	Ugh, Those Feels Again
"Whoa" (solo or featuring Pharrell Williams)	2019	—	—	20	16	2	Ugh, Those Feels Again
"Wolves Are Out Tonight"	2019	—	—	—	—	—	Godfather of Harlem OST
"Dying 4 Your Love"	2020	—	—	24	—	—	Temporary Highs in the Violet Skies
"Lost You"	2021	36	—	14	22	6	Temporary Highs in the Violet Skies
"Neon Peach" (featuring Tyler, the Creator)	2021	37	—	—	—	—	Temporary Highs in the Violet Skies
"In Your Eyes"	2021	—	—	9	2	—	Temporary Highs in the Violet Skies
"Do 4 Love"	2022	—	—	—	—	—	Non-album singles
"Be My Summer"	2023	—	—	—	—	—	Non-album singles
"Sweet Tea"	2023	—	—	—	—	—	Non-album singles
"Wait a Little Longer"	2023	—	—	—	—	—	Non-album singles
"Karma"	2026	—	—	—	—	—	Legendary Love
"I Love You"	2026	—	—	—	—	—	Legendary Love
"Just Friends"	2026	—	—	—	—	—	Legendary Love
"Warmest Shade Of Blue"	2026	—	—	—	—	—	Legendary Love
"—" denotes a recording that did not chart or was not released in that territory.

=== As Sheri ===
Title	Year	Peak chart positions	Album
Title	Year	SWE	Album
"Hit and Run"	2009	12	First Sign
"First Sign"	2009	—	First Sign
"U Got Me Good"	2009	2	First Sign
"Smooth Operator"	2009	—	First Sign
"—" denotes a recording that did not chart or was not released in that territory.

== Guest appearances ==
Title	Year	Other artist(s)	Album
"Hustle Harder"	2014	Common, Dreezy	Nobody's Smiling
"Jump off the Roof"	2015	Vince Staples	Summertime '06
"Cruel Intentions (Remix)"	2016	JMSN	Non-album single
"Way To Go"	2017	Joyner Lucas	508-507-2209
"Comin Back"	2018	Kawala Bravo	Comin Back
"Time"	2019	Boogie	Everythings for Sale
"Between Us"	2020	Dvsn	A Muse In Her Feelings
"You Save Me"	2020	Alicia Keys	Alicia
"Last Time"	2020	Giveon	When It's All Said and Done
"Law Of Attraction"	2021	Dave	We're All Alone In This Together
"Forever"	2023	Charlotte Day Wilson	Cyan Blue
