= Tsuchitaru Station =

Railway station in Yuzawa, Niigata Prefecture, Japan

Tsuchitaru Station 土樽駅
- Tsuchitaru Station in July 2021

General information
- Location: Tsuchidaru, Yuzawa Town, Minamiuonuma City, Niigata Prefecture 949-6103; Japan
- Coordinates: 36.8753°N 138.8615°E
- Operator: JR East
- Line: Jōetsu Line
- Distance: 80.1 km (49.8 mi) from Takasaki
- Platforms: 2 side platforms
- Tracks: 2

Construction
- Structure type: At grade

Other information
- Status: Unstaffed
- Website: Official website

History
- Opened: 8 December 1933; 92 years ago

Services
Preceding station	JR East	Following station
Doai towards Takasaki	Jōetsu Line	Echigo-Nakazato towards Nagaoka
Location
- Location within Niigata Prefecture Location within Chubu region Location within Japan

Tsuchitaru Station (土樽駅, Tsuchitaru-eki) is a railway station on the Jōetsu Line in the town of Yuzawa, Minamiuonuma District, Niigata Prefecture, Japan, operated by the East Japan Railway Company (JR East).

== Lines ==
Tsuchitaru Station is served by the Jōetsu Line, and is located 80.1 kilometers from the starting point of the line at Takasaki.

== Station layout ==
The station has two ground-level opposed side platforms connected by a footbridge. The station is unattended.

=== Platforms ===
station side	■ Jōetsu Line	for Minakami and Takasaki
opposite side	■ Jōetsu Line	for Echigo-Yuzawa and Nagaoka

== History ==
Tsuchitaru Station began passenger operations on 8 December 1933 as a temporary station open during the ski season. It began permanent operations from 10 January 1941. Upon the privatization of the Japanese National Railways (JNR) on 1 April 1987, it came under the control of JR East.

== Surrounding area ==
- Tsuchitaru Hydroelectric Power Station

== See also ==
- List of railway stations in Japan
