= Shiozawa =

Shiozawa (written: 塩沢) is a Japanese surname. Notable people with the surname include:

- Kaneto Shiozawa (塩沢 兼人; 1954–2000), Japanese voice actor
- Kōichi Shiozawa (塩沢 幸一; 1881–1943), Imperial Japanese Navy admiral
- Shogo Shiozawa (塩沢 勝吾; born 1982), Japanese footballer

== Fictional characters ==
- Shiozawa (Urara Meirocho) (塩沢), a character in the manga series Urara Meirocho

== See also ==
- Shiozawa Station, a railway station in Minamiuonuma, Niigata Prefecture, Japan
- Shiozawa, Niigata, a former town in Minamiuonuma District, Niigata Prefecture, Japan
