= List of cultural properties of Yuzawa, Niigata =

This list is of the cultural properties of Japan located within the town of Yuzawa in Niigata Prefecture.

== Statistics ==
12 Properties have been designated and a further 1 Property registered.

Cultural Properties of Japan		National	Prefectural	Municipal	Total
Designated Cultural Properties
Tangible	Structures				
Tangible	Paintings				
Tangible	Sculptures			3	3
Tangible	Applied Crafts				
Tangible	Calligraphic works Classical books			1	1
Tangible	Ancient documents				
Tangible	Archeological artefacts				
Tangible	Historic materials				
Intangible					
Folk	Tangible			1	1
Folk	Intangible				
Monuments	Historic Sites		2	2	4
Monuments	Places of Scenic Beauty	1			1
Monuments	Natural Monuments			2	2
Cultural Landscapes					
Preservation Districts					
Conservation Techniques					
Total		1	2	9	12
Registered Cultural Properties
Tangible	Structures	1			1
Tangible	Works of Art or Craft				
Folk Tangible					
Monuments	Historic Sites				
Monuments	Places of Scenic Beauty				
Monuments	Natural Monuments				
Total		1			1

== Designated Cultural Properties ==
Property	Owner	Date	No. of Assets	Comments	Image	Coordinates	Type	Level	Ref.
Kiyotsu Gorge 清津峡; Kiyotsu-kyō			1	extends into Tōkamachi; also a Natural Monument		36°55′10″N 138°53′06″E	Place of Scenic Beauty	National	
Mikuni Kaidō Waki Honjin Site (Ikeda House) 三国街道脇本陣跡池田家; Mikuni Kaidō waki-honjin ato Ikeda-ya			1			36°53′42″N 138°46′41″E	Historic Site	Prefectural	
Arato Castle Site 荒戸城跡; Arata-jō ato			1			36°54′16″N 138°47′43″E	Historic Site	Prefectural	
Yorii Castle Site 寄居城跡; Yorii-jō ato			1			36°47′32″N 138°47′21″E	Historic Site	Municipal	
Hanging Scroll by the Brush of Kawabata Yasunari 川端康成書軸物; Kawabata Yasunari-sho jikumono			1	at the Yuzawa Museum of History and Folklore (湯沢町歴史民俗資料館)		36°56′20″N 138°48′20″E	Calligraphic Work	Municipal	
Kosaku Hundred Kōshintō 小坂百庚申塔一群; Kosaka hyaku-kōshintō ichi-gun			1				Tangible Folk	Municipal	
Araya Bishamondō Giant Sugi 荒谷毘沙門堂の大杉; Araya Bishamondō no ō-sugi			1				Natural Monument	Municipal	
Suwa Shrine Giant Sugi 諏訪社の大杉; Suwa-sha no ō-sugi			1			36°56′48″N 138°48′05″E	Natural Monument	Municipal	
Niō Statues 仁王像; Niō-zō			2	in the sanmon of Zuishō-an (瑞祥庵)		36°54′43″N 138°50′36″E	Sculpture	Municipal	
Original Mikuni Pass Gongen-dō Doors 元三国峠権現堂扉 gen-Mikuni-tōge Gongen-dō no tobira			1	at Takahan Ryokan		36°56′50″N 138°47′59″E	Sculpture	Municipal	
Seated Wooden Statue of Aizen Myōō 愛染明王座像; Aizen Myōō zazō	private		1				Sculpture	Municipal	
Mikuni Kaidō Futai Honjin Site (Tomizawa House) 三国街道二居本陣富沢家; Mikuni Kaidō Futai honjin ato Tomizawa-ya			1			36°50′41″N 138°46′48″E	Historic Site	Municipal	

== Registered Cultural Properties ==
Property	Owner	Date	No. of Assets	Comments	Image	Coordinates	Type	Level	Ref.
Daigentagawa No.1 Check Dam 大源太川第1号砂防堰堤; Daigentagawa daiichigō sabōentei		Shōwa period (1939)	1			36°57′14″N 138°45′19″E	Structures	National	

== See also ==
- Cultural Properties of Japan
- Snow Country
