= Iwappara-Skiing Ground Station =

Railway station in Yuzawa, Niigata Prefecture, Japan

Iwappara-Skiing Ground Station 岩原スキー場前駅
- Iwappara-Skiing Ground Station in July 2021

General information
- Location: Tsuchidaru, Yuzawa-machi, Minamiuonuma-gun, Niigata-ken 949-6103; Japan
- Coordinates: 36.9242°N 138.8396°E
- Elevation: 405.6 m
- Operator: JR East
- Line: ■ Jōetsu Line
- Distance: 91.1 km from Takasaki
- Platforms: 2 side platforms
- Tracks: 2

Other information
- Status: Unstaffed
- Website: Official website

History
- Opened: 8 December 1933; 92 years ago
- Former names: Iwappara-skijōmae Station

Services
Preceding station	JR East	Following station
Echigo-Nakazato towards Takasaki	Jōetsu Line	Echigo-Yuzawa towards Nagaoka
Location
- Location within Japan

Iwappara-Skiing Ground Station (岩原スキー場前駅, Iwappara-Sukī-jō-mae-eki) is a railway station on the Joetsu Line in the town of Yuzawa, Minamiuonuma District, Niigata Prefecture, Japan, operated by East Japan Railway Company (JR East).

== Lines ==
Iwappara-Skiing Ground Station is served by the Jōetsu Line, and is located 91.1 kilometers from the starting point of the line at Takasaki.

== Station layout ==
The station has two ground-level opposed side platforms connected by an underground passage. The station is unattended.

=== Platforms ===
station side	■ Jōetsu Line	for Minakami and Takasaki
opposite side	■ Jōetsu Line	for Echigo-Yuzawa and Nagaoka

== History ==
The station first opened on 8 December 1933 as a temporary stop on the Joetsu Line. It was closed in 1946 when the nearby ski slope was taken over by the allied occupation forces. It reopened as a temporary stop on 20 December 1952, and from 1 September 1981, the station operated all year round. With the privatization of Japanese National Railways (JNR) on 1 April 1987, the station came under the control of JR East.

== See also ==
- List of railway stations in Japan
