= Case Study 01: Tour =

2019 concert tour by Daniel Caesar

- Tour by Daniel Caesar
- Associated album: Case Study 01
- Start date: July 20, 2019
- End date: November 28, 2019
- No. of shows: 5 in Asia; 41 in North America; 13 in Europe; 59 in total

Daniel Caesar concert chronology
- Freudian, a World Tour (2017–18); Case Study 01: Tour (2019)

The Case Study 01: Tour is the second headlining concert tour by Canadian recording artist Daniel Caesar. The tour is in support of his album, Case Study 01 (2019).

== Opening acts ==
- Koffee (North America, select dates)
- August Wahh (Quezon City)
- CRWN (Quezon City)

== Setlist ==
The following setlist was obtained from the concert held on July 23, 2019, at the New Frontier Theater in Quezon City in the Philippines. It does not represent all concerts for the duration of the tour.

1. "Cyanide"
2. "Love Again"
3. "Restore the Feeling"
4. "Open Up"
5. "Violet"
6. "Complexities"
7. "Hold Me Down"
8. "Too Deep to Turn Back"
9. "Frontal Lobe Muzik"
10. "Get You"
11. "Best Part"
12. "Blessed"
13. "Entropy"

Encore

14. "Japanese Denim"
15. "Superposition"

== Tour dates ==
Date	City	Country	Venue
Asia
July 20, 2019^{[A]}	Jakarta	Indonesia	JiExpo Kemayoran
July 21, 2019^{[B]}	Genting Highlands	Malaysia	The Ranch at Gohtong Jaya
July 23, 2019	Quezon City	Philippines	New Frontier Theater
July 25, 2019	Bangkok	Thailand	Thunder Dome
July 27, 2019^{[C]}	Yuzawa	Japan	Naeba Ski Resort
North America
July 30, 2019	Honolulu	United States	The Republik
August 1, 2019	Honolulu	United States	The Republik
August 11, 2019	Detroit	United States	The Fillmore Detroit
August 12, 2019	Chicago	United States	Chicago Theatre
August 14, 2019	Denver	United States	Summit Music Hall
August 17, 2019	Seattle	United States	Showbox SoDo
August 18, 2019	Seattle	United States	Showbox SoDo
August 20, 2019	Portland	United States	Roseland Theater
August 21, 2019	Portland	United States	Roseland Theater
August 23, 2019	Oakland	United States	Fox Oakland Theatre
August 24, 2019	San Francisco	United States	SF Masonic Auditorium
August 26, 2019	Los Angeles	United States	Greek Theatre
August 27, 2019	Los Angeles	United States	Shrine Auditorium
August 29, 2019	Las Vegas	United States	House of Blues
August 30, 2019	Phoenix	United States	The Van Buren
September 1, 2019	Dallas	United States	South Side Ballroom
September 4, 2019	Houston	United States	Revention Music Center
September 5, 2019	Austin	United States	Moody Theater
September 6, 2019	New Orleans	United States	The Fillmore New Orleans
September 8, 2019	Miami Beach	United States	The Fillmore Miami Beach
September 10, 2019	Atlanta	United States	Fox Theatre
September 11, 2019	Nashville	United States	Marathon Music Works
September 12, 2019	Charlotte	United States	The Fillmore Charlotte
September 14, 2019^{[D]}	Concord	United States	Concord Pavilion
September 18, 2019	New York City	United States	Radio City Music Hall
September 21, 2019	Philadelphia	United States	The Filmore Philadelphia
September 23, 2019	Boston	United States	House of Blues
September 24, 2019	Washington, D.C.	United States	Echostage
September 25, 2019	Cleveland	United States	House of Blues
September 28, 2019	Toronto	Canada	Budweiser Stage
September 29, 2019	Toronto	Canada	Budweiser Stage
Europe
October 13, 2019	Manchester	England	O_{2} Apollo
October 14, 2019	Birmingham	England	O_{2} Academy
October 16, 2019	London	England	O_{2} Academy Brixton
October 19, 2019	Utrecht	Netherlands	Ronda
October 20, 2019	Paris	France	Élysée Montmartre
October 22, 2019	Berlin	Germany	Metropol
October 23, 2019	Cologne	Germany	Carlswerk Victoria
October 25, 2019	Zürich	Switzerland	X-tra
October 26, 2019	Milan	Italy	Fabrique
October 28, 2019	Hamburg	Germany	Große Freiheit 36
October 31, 2019	Copenhagen	Denmark	Vega
November 4, 2019	Barcelona	Spain	Sala Bikini
November 5, 2019	Madrid	Spain	Sala La Riviera
North America
November 9, 2019^{[E]}	Los Angeles	United States	Dodger Stadium
November 12, 2019	Laval	Canada	The Theatre at Place Bell
November 13, 2019	Quebec City	Canada	Impérial Bell
November 14, 2019	Halifax	Canada	The Theatre at Scotiabank Centre
November 20, 2019	Winnipeg	Canada	The Theatre at Bell MTS Place
November 22, 2019	Saskatoon	Canada	TCU Place
November 23, 2019	Edmonton	Canada	Northern Alberta Jubilee Auditorium
November 25, 2019	Calgary	Canada	Southern Alberta Jubilee Auditorium
November 27, 2019	Vancouver	Canada	UBC Thunderbird Theatre
November 28, 2019	Vancouver	Canada	UBC Thunderbird Theatre

Festivals and other miscellaneous performances
^{A} This concert was a part of "We the Fest"
^{B} This concert was a part of the "Good Vibes Festival"
^{C} This concert was a part of the "Fuji Rock Festival"
^{D} This concert was a part of the "Lights On Festival"
^{E} This concert was a part of the "Camp Flog Gnaw"

Cancellations and rescheduled shows

July 28, 2019	Incheon, South Korea	Paradise City	Cancelled
