= Echigo-Nakazato Station =

Railway station in Yuzawa, Niigata Prefecture, Japan

Echigo-Nakazato Station 越後中里駅
- Echigo-Nakazato Station in July 2021

General information
- Location: Tsuchidaru, Yuzawa-machi, Minamiuonuma-gun, Niigata-ken 949-6103; Japan
- Coordinates: 36.9105°N 138.8487°E
- Operator: JR East
- Line: ■ Jōetsu Line
- Distance: 87.4 km from Takasaki
- Platforms: 1 island + 1 side platform
- Tracks: 3

Other information
- Status: Unstaffed
- Website: Official website

History
- Opened: 1 September 1931; 95 years ago
- Rebuilt: 1980; 46 years ago

Services
Preceding station	JR East	Following station
Tsuchitaru towards Takasaki	Jōetsu Line	Iwappara-Skiing Ground towards Nagaoka
Location
- Location within Japan

Echigo-Nakazato Station (越後中里駅, Echigo-Nakazato-eki) is a railway station on the Jōetsu Line in the town of Yuzawa, Minamiuonuma District, Niigata Prefecture, Japan, operated by the East Japan Railway Company (JR East).

== Lines ==
Echigo-Nakazato Station is a station on the Jōetsu Line, and is located 87.4 kilometers from the starting point of the line at Takasaki.

== Station layout ==
The station has a one ground-level island platform and one side platform connected by a footbridge. The station is unattended.

=== Platforms ===
1	■ Jōetsu Line	for Echigo-Yuzawa and Nagaoka
2	■ Jōetsu Line	for Echigo-Yuzawa and Nagaoka (starting trains)
3	■ Jōetsu Line	for Tsuchitaru and Minakami

== History ==
Echigo-Nakazato Station opened on 1 September 1931. A new station building was completed in 1980. Upon the privatization of the Japanese National Railways (JNR) on 1 April 1987, it came under the control of JR East.

== Surrounding area ==
- Echigo-Nakazato Ski Resort

== See also ==
- List of railway stations in Japan
