= Situationship =

Situationship may refer to:

- Situationship (slang term), in Generation Z slang, a term describing an ambiguous romantic relationship
  - Situationship (casual dating), a specific form
- "Situationship", a 2019 song by Snoh Aalegra from Ugh, Those Feels Again
