= Freudian, a World Tour =

2017–18 concert tour by Daniel Caesar

- Tour by Daniel Caesar
- Promotional poster for tour
- Associated album: Freudian
- Start date: October 16, 2017
- End date: March 20, 2018
- No. of shows: 32 in North America; 10 in Europe; 6 in Asia; 4 in Australasia; 52 in total

Daniel Caesar concert chronology
- Freudian, a World Tour (2017–18); Case Study 01: Tour (2019)

The Freudian, a World Tour was the debut headlining concert tour by Canadian recording artist Daniel Caesar. The tour was in support of his debut album, Freudian (2017). The tour played over 50 dates in North America, Europe, Asia and Australasia.

== Background ==
On August 25, 2017, Caesar released his debut album titled Freudian. At the same date, Caesar announced the North American tour dates, dubbed as "Freudian, A North American Tour". On September 13, 2017, Caesar announced the European tour dates that will take place in January and February 2018. On January 9, 2018, Caesar announced Asian and Australasia dates.

== Opening acts ==
- Snoh Aalegra (North America)
- DO NOT PUSH! (London, Outram, Brisbane, Sydney, Melbourne)

== Setlist ==
The following setlist was obtained from the concert held on February 6, 2018, at KOKO in London, England. It does not represent all concerts for the duration of the tour.

1. "Freudian"
2. "Japanese Denim"
3. "Best Part"
4. "Violet"
5. "Death & Taxes"
6. "Hold Me Down"
7. "Take Me Away"
8. "West"
9. "Neu Roses (Transgressor's Song)"
10. "Transform"
11. "We Find Love"
12. "Blessed"
13. "Get You"

== Tour dates ==
Date	City	Country	Venue
North America
October 16, 2017	Philadelphia	United States	Union Transfer
October 19, 2017	Baltimore	United States	Soundstage
October 21, 2017	Silver Spring	United States	The Fillmore Silver Spring
October 22, 2017	Atlanta	United States	The Masquerade
October 24, 2017	Houston	United States	Warehouse Live
October 25, 2017	Dallas	United States	RBC
October 26, 2017	Austin	United States	Grizzly Hall
October 30, 2017	San Diego	United States	The Stage Room
October 31, 2017	Los Angeles	United States	The Fonda Theatre
November 1, 2017	Los Angeles	United States	The Fonda Theatre
November 2, 2017	Las Vegas	United States	Vinyl
November 4, 2017	Santa Cruz	United States	The Catalyst
November 5, 2017	Santa Ana	United States	The Observatory
November 7, 2017	Oakland	United States	The New Parish
November 8, 2017	Sacramento	United States	Harlow's
November 10, 2017	Seattle	United States	Crocodile Cafe
November 11, 2017	Victoria	Canada	Capital Ballroom
November 12, 2017	Vancouver	Canada	Vogue Theatre
November 13, 2017	Vancouver	Canada	Vogue Theatre
November 15, 2017	Calgary	Canada	Palace Theatre
November 16, 2017	Edmonton	Canada	Union Hall
November 19, 2017	Detroit	United States	El Club
November 20, 2017	Chicago	United States	Reggie's Rock Club
November 22, 2017	New York City	United States	Music Hall of Williamsburg
November 24, 2017	New York City	United States	Highline Ballroom
November 25, 2017	Montreal	Canada	Théâtre Corona
November 26, 2017	Ottawa	Canada	Algonquin Commons Theatre
December 16, 2017	Toronto	Canada	Danforth Music Hall
December 17, 2017	Toronto	Canada	Danforth Music Hall
December 18, 2017	Toronto	Canada	Danforth Music Hall
December 19, 2017	Toronto	Canada	Danforth Music Hall
December 20, 2017	Toronto	Canada	Danforth Music Hall
Europe
January 30, 2018	Cologne	Germany	Luxor
January 31, 2018	Paris	France	Club Yoyo
February 2, 2018	Manchester	England	Manchester Academy 2
February 3, 2018	Birmingham	England	O_{2} Institute
February 5, 2018	London	England	KOKO
February 6, 2018	London	England	KOKO
February 8, 2018	Stockholm	Sweden	Debaser
February 10, 2018	Copenhagen	Denmark	DR Koncerthuset 2
February 11, 2018	Berlin	Germany	Lido
February 13, 2018	Amsterdam	Netherlands	Melkweg
Asia
March 3, 2018^{[A]}	Jakarta	Indonesia	Jakarta International Expo
March 7, 2018	Seoul	South Korea	Yes24 Live Hall
March 10, 2018^{[B]}	Muntinlupa	Philippines	Filinvest City Event Grounds
March 12, 2018	Outram	Singapore	The Pavilion
March 13, 2018	Outram	Singapore	The Pavilion
March 14, 2018	Outram	Singapore	The Pavilion
Australasia
March 16, 2018^{[C]}	Auckland	New Zealand	Festival Playground Music Arena
March 17, 2018	Brisbane	Australia	256 Wickham
March 18, 2018	Sydney	Australia	Enmore Theatre
March 20, 2018	Melbourne	Australia	Forum Theatre

Festivals and other miscellaneous performances
^{A} This concert was a part of the "Jakarta International Java Jazz Festival"
^{B} This concert was a part of the "Wanderland Music and Arts Festival"
^{C} This concert was a part of the "Auckland Arts Festival"

Cancellations and rescheduled shows

October 21, 2017	Washington, D.C.	Songbyrd Music House	Moved to The Fillmore Silver Spring in Silver Spring, Maryland
October 26, 2017	Austin, Texas	Come and Take It Live	Moved to the Grizzly Hall
November 15, 2017	Calgary, Canada	Commonwealth Bar & Stage	Moved to the Palace Theatre
November 16, 2017	Edmonton, Canada	Starlite Room	Moved to the Union Hall
January 25, 2018	Stockholm, Sweden	Debaser	Rescheduled to February 8, 2018
January 26, 2018	Copenhagen, Denmark	DR Koncerthuset 2	Rescheduled to February 10, 2018
January 27, 2018	Berlin, Germany	Lido	Rescheduled to February 11, 2018
January 28, 2018	Amsterdam, Netherlands	Melkweg	Rescheduled to February 13, 2018
January 31, 2018	Paris, France	La Maroquinerie	Moved to Club Yoyo
February 2, 2018	Manchester, England	Gorilla	Moved to the Manchester Academy 2
March 5, 2018	Tokyo, Japan	Unit	Cancelled
March 13, 2018	Downtown Core, Singapore	Annexe Studio	Moved to The Pavilion in Outram, Singapore
March 18, 2018	Sydney, Australia	Metro Theatre	Moved to the Enmore Theatre
March 20, 2018	Melbourne, Australia	170 Russell	Moved to the Forum Theatre

=== Box office score data ===
Venue	City	Tickets sold / Available	Gross revenue
Music Hall of Williamsburg	Brooklyn	705 / 705 (100%)	$12,090
Théâtre Corona	Montreal	939 / 939 (100%)	$14,765
Union Transfer	Philadelphia	1,200 / 1,200 (100%)	$19,200
Soundstage	Baltimore	1,000 / 1,000 (100%)	$16,000
