= Muikamachi, Niigata =

Dissolved municipality in Niigata prefecture, Japan

Muikamachi (六日町, Muikamachi) was a town located in Minamiuonuma District, Niigata Prefecture, Japan.

As of 2003, the town had an estimated population of 28,687 and a density of 108.75 persons per km^{2}. The total area was 263.79 km^{2}.

Muikamachi was a popular destination for skiers.

On November 1, 2004, Muikamachi, along with the town of Yamato (also from Minamiuonuma District), was merged to create the city of Minamiuonuma.
