= Don't Explain (EP) =

EP by Snoh Aalegra
- Released: 8 April 2016
- Genres: R&B; soul
- Length: 25:55
- Label: ARTium
- Producers: No I.D.; DJ Dahi; Boi-1da; Frank Dukes; Christian Rich

Snoh Aalegra chronology
| There Will Be Sunshine (2014) | Don't Explain (2016) | Feels (2017) |

Don't Explain is the second EP by Swedish singer Snoh Aalegra. It was released on 8 April 2016 through ARTium Recordings. It contains features and production from James Fauntleroy, No I.D., Boi-1da, Christian Rich and DJ Dahi.

The EP features a cover of the 1944 song, "Don't Explain" by Billie Holiday and Arthur Herzog Jr. John Mayer plays guitar on "Under the Influence", and the final track, "Chaos", was written by Sia.

In a review for DJBooth, Lucas Garrison compared Aalegra's style on the EP to Drake, pointing in particular to the similarity in contributors, as Frank Dukes, Boi-1da and DJ Dahi also worked on Drake's 2016 album Views.

== Track listing ==
Don't Explain track listing
| No. | Title | Writer(s) | Producer | Length |
|---|---|---|---|---|
| 1. | "It's Just a Fever (Intro)" | Snoh Aalegra; Ernest Dion Wilson; Sam Dew | No I.D. | 0:59 |
| 2. | "In Your River" | Aalegra; Adam King Feeney; Matthew Tavares; Taiwo Hassan; Kehinde Hassan | Christian Rich | 3:53 |
| 3. | "Charleville 9200" (featuring James Fauntleroy) | Aalegra; James Fauntleroy | Boi-1da; Frank Dukes | 2:35 |
| 4. | "Home" | Aalegra; Dew | DJ Dahi | 3:31 |
| 5. | "Don't Explain" | Billie Holiday; Arthur Herzog Jr. | DJ Dahi | 3:44 |
| 6. | "Under the Influence" | Aalegra; JP Saxe | No I.D. | 4:23 |
| 7. | "Under the Influence Pt. II" (featuring John Mayer) | Aalegra; JP Saxe | No I.D. | 1:50 |
| 8. | "It's All on Me (Outro)" | Aalegra; Dew | No I.D. | 0:46 |
| 9. | "Chaos" | Sia | No I.D. | 4:04 |
| Total length: | | | | 25:55 |

Sample credits

- "In Your River" samples "Stark's Reality" by BadBadNotGood featuring Ghostface Killah.
- "Don't Explain" covers "Don't Explain" by Billie Holiday
