= Yamato, Niigata =

Dissolved municipality in Niigata prefecture, Japan

Yamato (大和町, Yamato-machi) was a town located in Minamiuonuma District, Niigata Prefecture, Japan.

The town was established as a village in 1956, and was elevated to a town in 1962.

As of 2003, the town had an estimated population of 15,195 and a density of 116.07 persons per km^{2}. The total area was 130.91 km^{2}.

On November 1, 2004, Yamato, along with the town of Muikamachi (also from Minamiuonuma District), was merged to create the city of Minamiuonuma.
