= Feels (Snoh Aalegra album) =

Studio album by Snoh Aalegra
- Released: 20 October 2017
- Genres: R&B; soul
- Length: 41:30
- Label: ARTium
- Producers: Snoh Aalegra; Maneesh; No I.D.; Leven Kali; Stelios Phili; Atu; Dpat; The Arcade; Scribz Riley; Brandon Eugene Owens; Allakoi "Mic Holden" Peete; Ryan Marrone; J.Valle; Christian Rich; Dammo; Khirye Tyler; Jeff Gitelman; Adrian Younge

Snoh Aalegra chronology
Don't Explain (2016)	Feels (2017)	Ugh, Those Feels Again (2019)

Singles from Feels
- 1. "Feels" Released: 22 November 2016; 2. "Nothing Burns Like The Cold" Released: 24 February 2017; 3. "Time" Released: 23 March 2017; 4. "Fool For You" Released: 18 September 2017; 5. "Sometimes" Released: 20 October 2017

Feels is the debut album by Swedish singer Snoh Aalegra. It was released on 20 October 2017 through ARTium.

== Music ==
The album is a "nostalgic blend of soul and R&B" which Aalegra calls "cinematic soul". In the album Aalegra collaborated with Vince Staples, Vic Mensa, Logic, and Timbuktu. The first single off the album is the song Feels released on November 22, 2016. While the second single, Nothing Burns Like the Cold was released on February 24, 2017, produced by Christian Rich and featuring Vince Staples. A year later, on 12 September 2018, her single "Nothing Burns Like the Cold" was used by Apple for their iPhone XS announcement video and commercials. The third single off the album "Time" was sampled by Drake on "Do Not Disturb", the closing track on his 2017 mixtape More Life.

== Track listing ==
Feels track listing
No.	Title	Writer(s)	Producer	Length
1.	"All I have (Intro)"	Snoh Aalegra	Maneesh; No I.D.; Leven Kali; Stelios Phili	1:54
2.	"Sometimes" (featuring Logic)	Aalegra; Sir Robert Bryson Hall II	Atu; Dpat	3:12
3.	"Worse"	Aalegra	Atu; Dpat	2:12
4.	"You Got Me"	Aalegra; Kurtis McKenzie	The Arcade; Scribz Riley	2:58
5.	"Out Of Your Way"	Aalegra; stephen feigenbaum	Brandon Eugene Owens; Allakoi "Mic Holden" Peete	3:46
6.	"You Keep Me Waiting"	Aalegra; Victor Kwesi Mensah; Jonathan Percy Starker Saxe	No I.D.; Ryan Marrone	4:27
7.	"Fool For You"	Aalegra; Marcus Semaj	J.Valle	3:14
8.	"Time"	Aalegra; Leven Kali	Snoh Aalegra; Leven Kali	3:44
9.	"Nothing Burns Like The Cold" (featuring Vince Staples)	Aalegra; Kehinde Hassan; Taiwo Hassan; Isaac Hayes; Vincent Jamal Staples	Christian Rich	3:29
10.	"Feels"	Aalegra	No I.D.	3:47
11.	"Like I Used To" (featuring Timbuktu)	Aalegra; Jason Diakité	Dammo; Khirye Tyler; No I.D.	2:41
12.	"Walls"	Aalegra; Jeffrey Gitelman	Atu; Dpat; Jeff Gitelman	3:17
13.	"Recent Times"	Aalegra	Adrian Younge	2:43
Total length:				41:30

Sample credits:

“Nothing Burns Like the Cold” samples “Ike's Rap II” by Isaac Hayes and "In The Alley Ways" by Ken Thorne.

== Release history ==
List of release dates, showing region, formats, label, editions and reference
Region	Date	Format(s)	Label	Ref.
Various	20 October 2017	Digital download; streaming	ARTium Recordings	
