= Takahan Ryokan =

Ryokan in Yuzawa, Niigata, Japan

Coordinates: 36.9471°N 138.7998°E

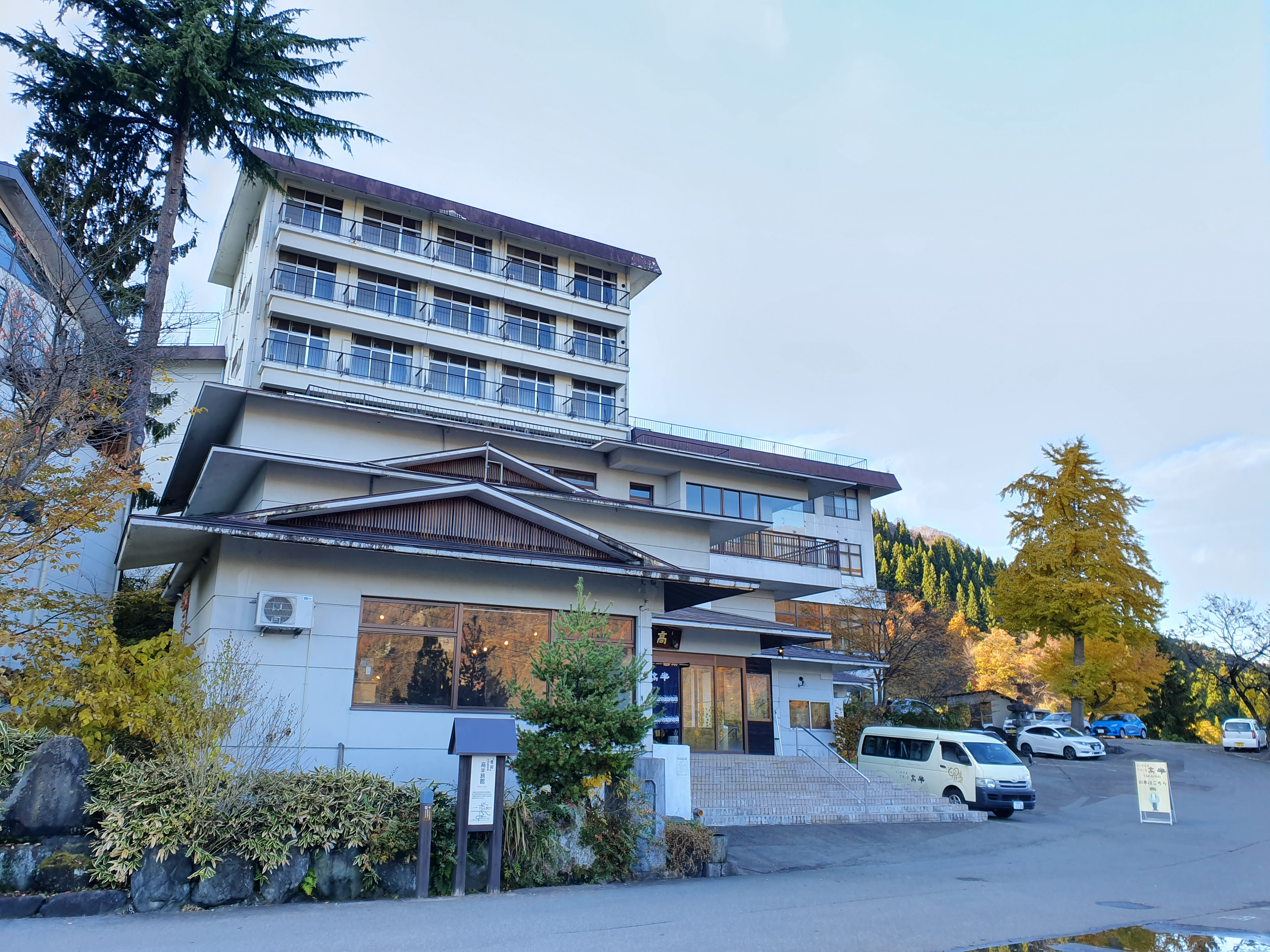
- Takahan Ryokan in November 2020
- Interactive map of Takahan Ryokan
- Location: Yuzawa, Niigata, Japan

Site notes
- Visitors: 20,000+ per year

Takahan Ryokan is a historic ryokan in Yuzawa, Niigata, Japan. It is over 800 years old. The inn has an onsen called Tamago no Yu (Japanese for "Egg Water") which is supplied by natural hot springs with a slight amount of sulfur. The inn has approximately 20,000 annual visitors, many of whom visit to soak in the onsen.

The setting of Yasunari Kawabata's novel Snow Country is based on the area around the inn. The owners have preserved the room that Kawabata stayed and wrote in during a visit, along with some of his personal effects.
