= I Want You Around =

Single by Snoh Aalegra

from the album Ugh, Those Feels Again
- Released: 18 February 2019
- Genre: R&B
- Length: 3:32 (original or remix)
- Label: AWAL; ARTium
- Songwriters: Snoh Nowrozi; Marcus James
- Producers: Big White; Cam O'bi; Dee Lilly; Nes; Rob Holladay

Snoh Aalegra singles chronology
"Out of Your Way" (2018)	"I Want You Around" (2019)	"You" (2019)

"I Want You Around" (stylized as I want you around) is a song by Swedish-Iranian singer and songwriter Snoh Aalegra, released as the second single from her second studio album Ugh, Those Feels Again (2019). The song was written by Aalegra and Marcus James, and it was produced by Big White, Cam O'bi, Dee Lilly, Nes and Rob Holladay. It was released on 18 February 2019. On November 1, 2019, a remix of "I Want You Around" featuring American singer and rapper 6lack was released to mixed reviews from critics.

"I Want You Around" reached number 1, on the Billboard Adult R&B Songs chart, number 13 on the Billboard Hot R&B/Hi-Hop Airplay chart, number 21 on the Billboard Hot R&B Songs chart, and number 23 on the Billboard Bubbling Under Hot 100 chart.

== Music video ==
The music video for "I Want You Around" was directed by Alexander Black and aided by I.P.W. The music video shows Aalegra with rapper, A$AP Twelvyy spending time in a romantic day together and wrapped up in each other's arms and sharing moments at home and on the road.

== Certifications ==
Region	Certification	Certified units/sales
United Kingdom (BPI)	Silver	200,000^{‡}
United States (RIAA)	Platinum	1,000,000^{‡}
^{‡} Sales+streaming figures based on certification alone.
