= Temporary Highs in the Violet Skies =

Studio album by Snoh Aalegra
- Released: 9 July 2021
- Studios: United (Los Angeles); Criteria (Miami); Shangri-La (Malibu); Chalice (Los Angeles); Connolly (Los Angeles)
- Genre: R&B
- Length: 46:26
- Labels: ARTium; Roc Nation
- Producers: Snoh Aalegra; Doctor O; Marco Bernadis; Terrace Martin; Mellodust; The Neptunes; Jack Nichols-Marcy; No I.D.; P2J; Christian Rich; Sensei Bueno; Swagg R'licious; Leon Thomas; Sevn Thomas; Tyler, the Creator; Malik Venner

Snoh Aalegra chronology
Ugh, Those Feels Again (2019)	Temporary Highs in the Violet Skies (2021)

Singles from Temporary Highs in the Violet Skies
- 1. "Dying 4 Your Love" Released: 10 July 2020; 2. "Lost You" Released: 21 June 2021; 3. "Neon Peach" Released: 25 October 2021; 4. "In your eyes" Released: 16 November 2021

Professional ratings
Aggregate scores
Source	Rating
Metacritic	77/100
Review scores
Source	Rating
Clash	7/10
The Guardian	3/5 stars
NME	4/5 stars
AllMusic	4/5 stars
The Line of Best Fit	8/10
Pitchfork	7.4/10
HipHopDX	3.8/5

Temporary Highs in the Violet Skies is the third studio album by Los Angeles–based Swedish singer Snoh Aalegra. It was released on 9 July 2021 through ARTium and Roc Nation.

The album received a nomination for Best R&B Album at the 64th Annual Grammy Awards.

== Track listing ==
Temporary Highs in the Violet Skies track listing
No.	Title	Writer(s)	Producer	Length
1.	"Indecisive"	Snoh Aalegra; Hue Strother; Johan Lenox	No I.D.; Lenox^{[c]}; Aalegra^{[v]}	3:15
2.	"Lost You"	Aalegra; Maneesh Bidaye; PJ Morton; Strother	No I.D.; Maneesh^{[c]}; Aalegra^{[v]}	2:57
3.	"In Your Eyes"	Aalegra; Anthony Clemons, Jr.; Marcus James; Chad Hugo; Pharrell Williams	The Neptunes; Aalegra^{[v]}; Clemons^{[v]}	3:35
4.	"Just Like That"	Aalegra; Clemons	Christian Rich; Aalegra^{[v]}; Clemons^{[v]}	3:07
5.	"Neon Peach" (featuring Tyler, the Creator)	Aalegra; Tyler Okonma	Tyler, the Creator^{[p]}; Aalegra^{[v]}	3:12
6.	"We Don't Have to Talk About It"	Aalegra; Ernest Wilson	No I.D.; Doctor O^{[c]}; Aalegra^{[v]}	3:19
7.	"Tangerine Dream"	Aalegra; Joel Compass	Compass^{[p]}; Aalegra^{[v]}	3:33
8.	"Temporary Highs"	Aalegra; Daijah Anasa Ross	Mellodust; Sensei Bueno; Aalegra^{[v]}; Ross^{[v]}	1:20
9.	"Violet Skies"	Aalegra; Sensei Bueno; Ross	Sensei Bueno; Swagg R'licious; Aalegra^{[v]}; Ross^{[v]}	3:04
10.	"In the Moment" (featuring Tyler, the Creator)	Aalegra; Okonma	Tyler, the Creator^{[p]}; Aalegra^{[v]}	3:34
11.	"On My Mind" (featuring James Fauntleroy)	Aalegra; Strother; James Fauntleroy	Sevn Thomas; Leon Thomas^{[p]}; Ali Rootws A16; Aalegra^{[v]}; Fauntleroy^{[v]}	3:42
12.	"Taste"	Aalegra; Marcus Semaj	No I.D.; Terrace Martin^{[c]}; Aalegra^{[v]}	2:17
13.	"Everything"	Aalegra; Ross	Aalegra^{[p]}; Sensei Bueno; Mellodust; Ross^{[v]}	4:05
14.	"Dying 4 Your Love"	Aalegra; Ari PenSmith	P2J; Marco Bernadis; Malik Venner; Jack Nichols-Marcy	3:24
15.	"Save Yourself"	Aalegra; Guy Roche; Tamir Ruffin; Phil Weatherspoon	Dpat & Atu; Aalegra^{[v]}	1:58
Total length:				46:26

Notes

- ^{^[p]} signifies a primary and vocal producer.
- ^{^[c]} signifies a co-producer.
- ^{^[v]} signifies a vocal producer.
- "Violet Skies" contains a sample from "Fried" by Frank Dukes.
- "Save Yourself" contains a sample of "Beauty" performed by Dru Hill.

== Personnel ==
Musicians

- Snoh Aalegra – lead vocals (all tracks), background vocals (tracks 1, 2, 4, 7–13, 15)
- No I.D. – keyboards (track 1)
- Johan Lenox – keyboards (track 1)
- PJ Morton – keyboards (track 2)
- Anthony Clemons, Jr. – background vocals (tracks 3, 5)
- Tyler, the Creator – background vocals (tracks 5, 10)
- Doctor O – keyboard (track 6)
- Joel Compass – background vocals, keyboards (track 7)
- Yakob – keyboards (track 7)
- Daijah Anasa Ross – background vocals (tracks 8, 9, 13)
- Mellodust – synthesizers, keyboards (tracks 8, 13); Mellotron (9)
- Sensei Bueno – guitar (tracks 8, 9, 13); bass, synthesizers, strings, drums (9, 13); keyboards (13)
- Swagg R'licious – drums, keyboards (track 9)
- Leon Thomas – background vocals (track 11)
- James Fauntleroy – background vocals (track 11)
- Ari PenSmith – background vocals (14)
- P2J – background vocals (track 14)

Technical

- Dale Becker – mastering
- Jeff Ellis – mixing (tracks 1–8, 10–14)
- Jim Caruana – mixing (tracks 9, 15), engineering (1, 2, 4, 6–9, 11–15), vocal engineering for Snoh Aalegra (3, 5, 10)
- Mike Larson – engineering (track 3)
- Kayla Reagan – engineering for mix (tracks 1–8, 10–14)
- Nathan Phillips – engineering for mix (tracks 3–5, 7, 8, 10, 14)
- Nate Alford – vocal engineering for Snoh Aalegra (track 3)
- Vic Wainstein – vocal engineering for Tyler, the Creator (tracks 5, 10)
- James Fauntleroy – vocal engineering for James Fauntleroy (track 11)
- Hector Vega – mastering assistance
- Fili Fitizolla – mastering assistance
- Connor Hedge – mastering assistance
- Justin Batad – engineering assistance (tracks 1–6, 10–12, 15)
- Nick Valentin – engineering assistance (track 3)
- Maximilian "Vandal" Deak – engineering assistance (track 3)
- Morgan David – engineering assistance (track 3)
- Monique Evelyn – engineering assistance (tracks 7–9, 13)
- Johnny Morgan – engineering assistance (track 14)
- Snoh Aalegra – background vocal arrangement (tracks 5, 10, 12), vocal arrangement (15)
- Anthony Clemons, Jr. – background vocal arrangement (tracks 5, 10)
- Tyler, the Creator – background vocal arrangement (track 5)
- Ari PenSmith – background vocal arrangement (track 10)
- Marcus Semaj – background vocal arrangement (track 12)

== Charts ==
Chart performance for Temporary Highs in the Violet Skies
Chart (2021)	Peak position
Canadian Albums (Billboard)	57
Swedish Albums (Sverigetopplistan)	45
UK Albums (Official Charts)	77
US Billboard 200	24
US Top R&B/Hip-Hop Albums (Billboard)	16

== Release history ==
List of release dates, showing region, formats, label, editions and reference
Region	Date	Format(s)	Label	Ref.
Various	9 July 2021	Digital download; streaming	ARTium	
