= Shiozawa, Niigata =

Dissolved municipality in Niigata prefecture, Japan

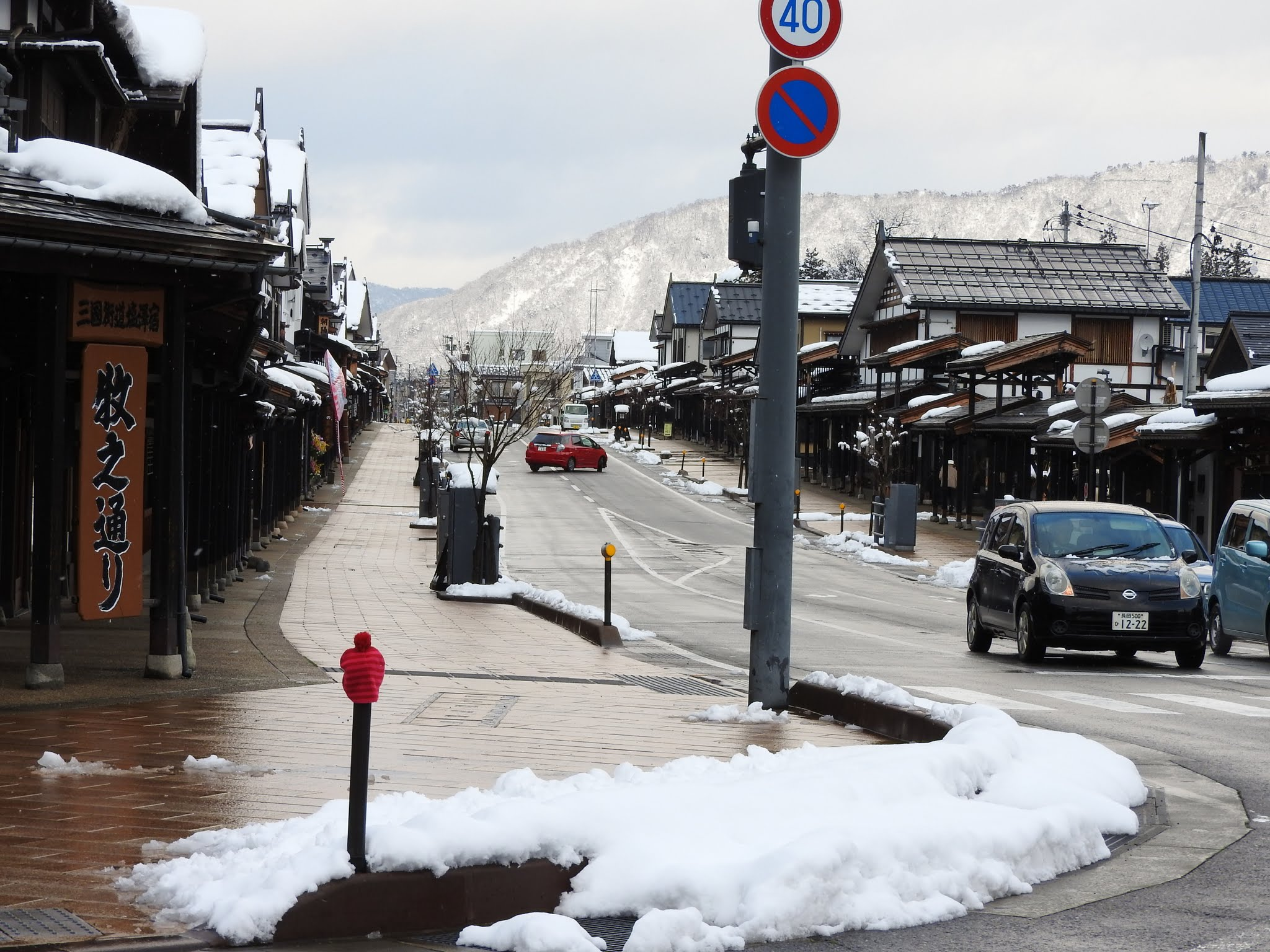
Bokushi Dori road in Shiozawa town

Shiozawa (塩沢町, Shiozawa-machi) was a town located in Minamiuonuma District, Niigata Prefecture, Japan.

As of 2003, the town had an estimated population of 20,142 and a density of 105.94 persons per km^{2}. The total area was 190.12 km^{2}.

On October 1, 2005, Shiozawa was merged into the expanded city of Minamiuonuma.
