= Shiozawa Station =

Railway station in Minamiuonuma, Niigata Prefecture, Japan

Shiozawa Station 塩沢駅
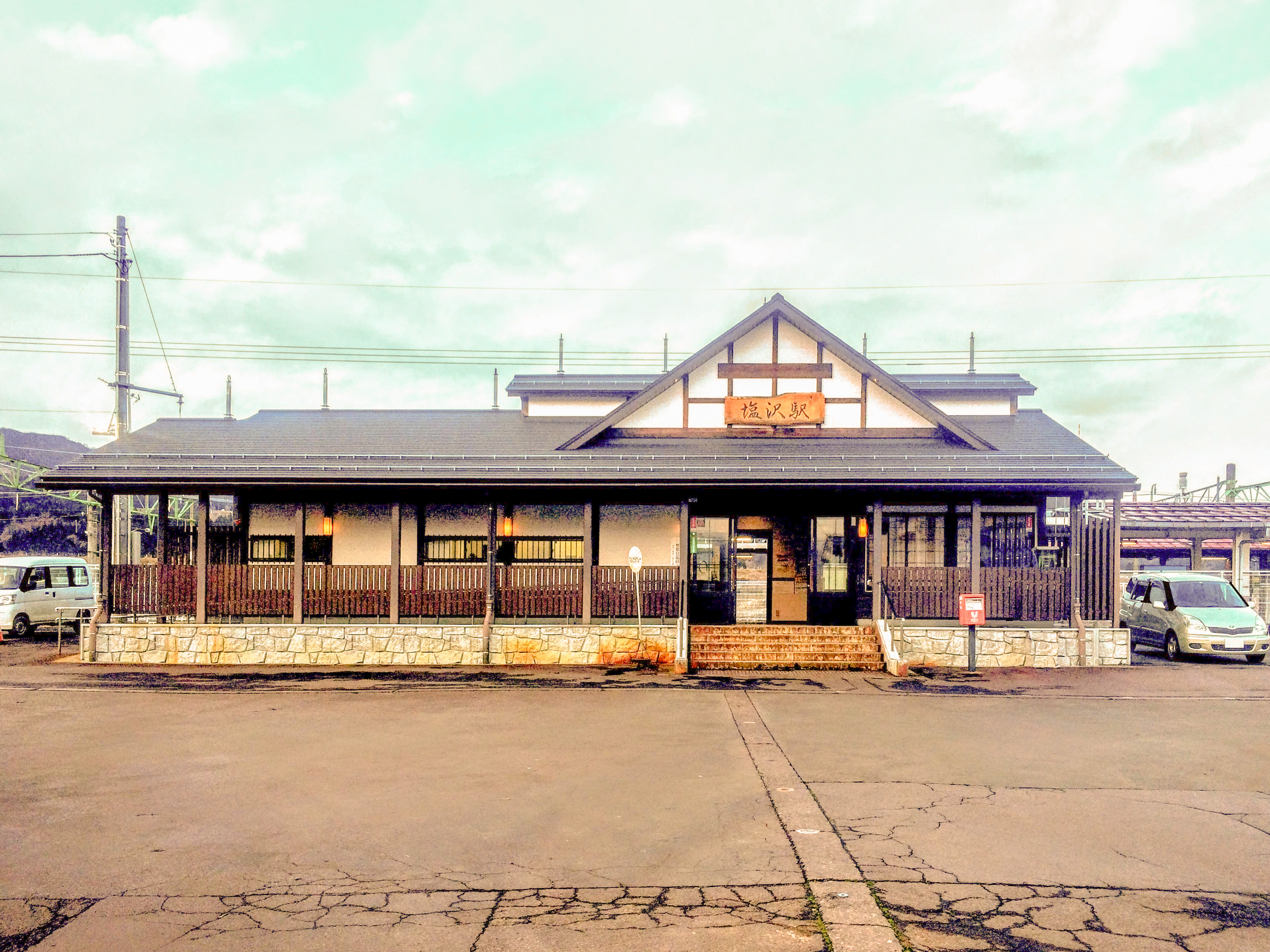
- Shiozawa Station in December 2017

General information
- Location: 1229-2 Shioawa, Minamiuonuma-shi, Niigata-ken 949-6408; Japan
- Coordinates: 37°02′29″N 138°50′55″E
- Elevation: 189.5 m
- Operator: JR East
- Line: ■ Joetsu Line
- Distance: 107.9 km from Takasaki
- Platforms: 1 side + 1 island platforms
- Tracks: 2

Other information
- Status: Unstaffed
- Website: Official website

History
- Opened: 18 November 1923; 102 years ago

Passengers
- FY2017: 575 daily

Services
| Preceding station | JR East | Following station |
|---|---|---|
| Jōetsu International Skiing Ground towards Takasaki | Jōetsu Line | Muikamachi towards Nagaoka |
| Preceding station | Hokuhoku Express | Following station |
| Echigo-Yuzawa Terminus | Hokuhoku Line Local (limited service) | Muikamachi towards Naoetsu |
Location
- Location within Japan

Shiozawa Station (塩沢駅, Shiozawa-eki) is a railway station on the Joetsu Line in the city of Minamiuonuma, Niigata, Japan, operated by the East Japan Railway Company (JR East).

== Lines ==
Shiozawa Station is served by the Joetsu Line, and is located 107.9 kilometers from the starting point of the line at Takasaki.

== Station layout ==
The station has one ground-level side platform and one ground-level island platform connected by a footbridge; however, one side of the island platform is fenced off and is not in use. The station is staffed.

=== Platforms ===
| 1 | ■ Joetsu Line | for Echigo-Yuzawa and Minakami |
| 3 | ■ Joetsu Line | for Urasa and Nagaoka |

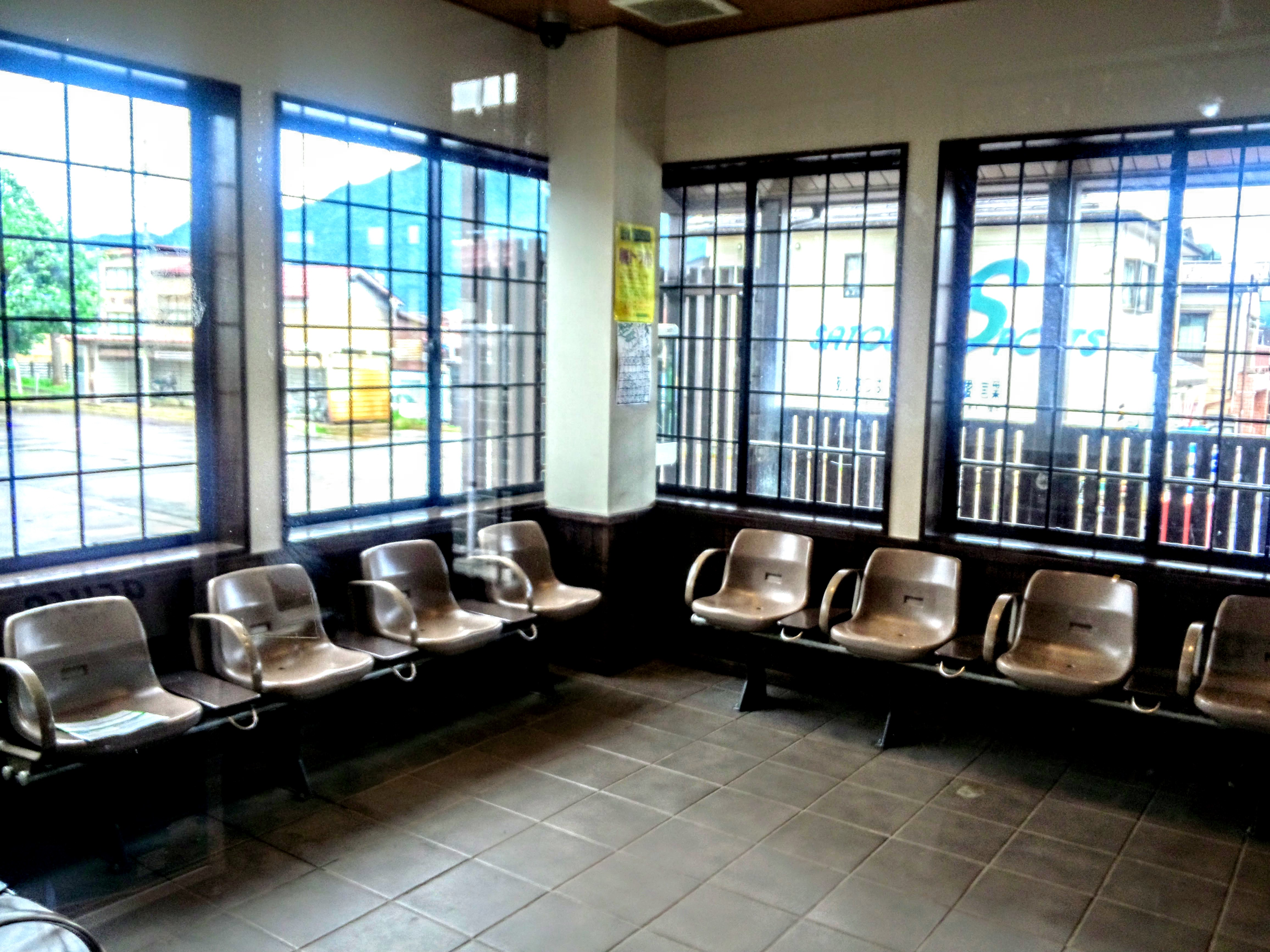
Indoor waiting room in June 2017

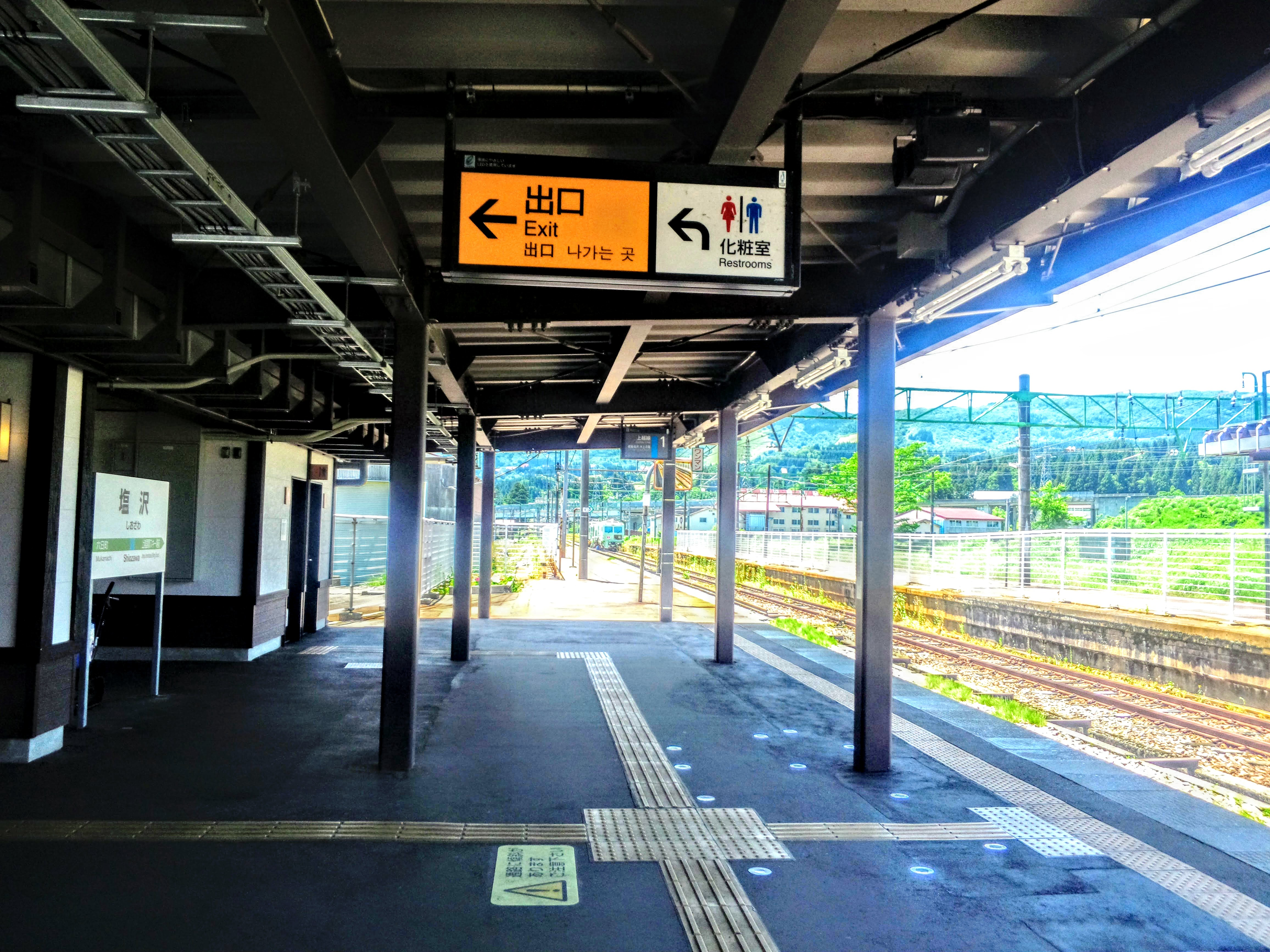
Shiozawa Station side platform in June 2017

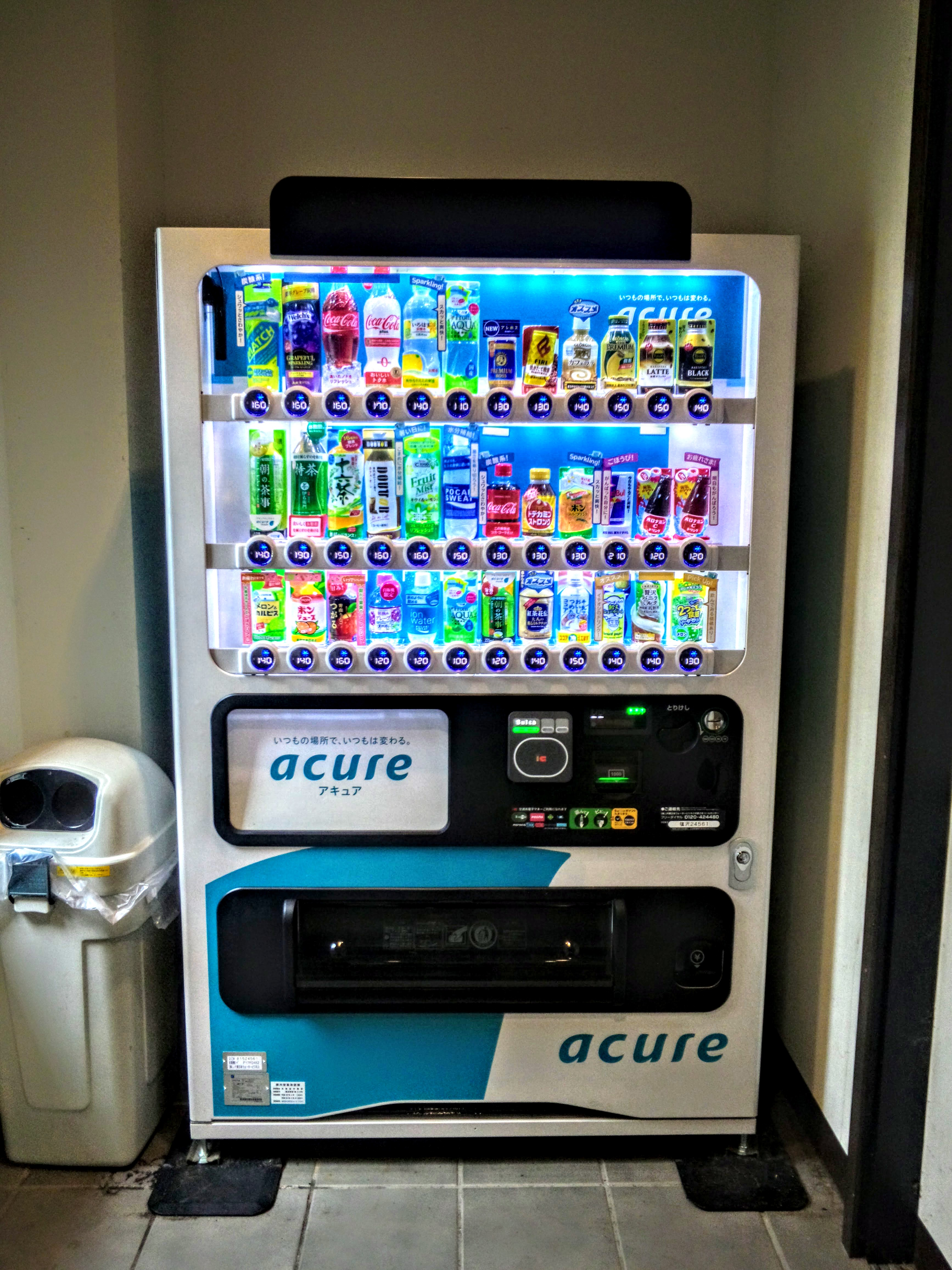
Vending machine in June 2017

== History ==
The station opened on 18 November 1923. Upon the privatization of Japanese National Railways (JNR) on 1 April 1987, it came under the control of JR East.

== Passenger statistics ==
In fiscal 2017, the station was used by an average of 575 passengers daily (boarding passengers only).

== Surrounding area ==
- Minamiuonuma City Shiozawa Office branch (Shiozawa Town office)
- Shiozawa primary school
- Shiozawa Junior High School
- Shiozawa Commercial and Technical High School
