= Minamiuonuma =

Minamiuonuma 南魚沼市
- City
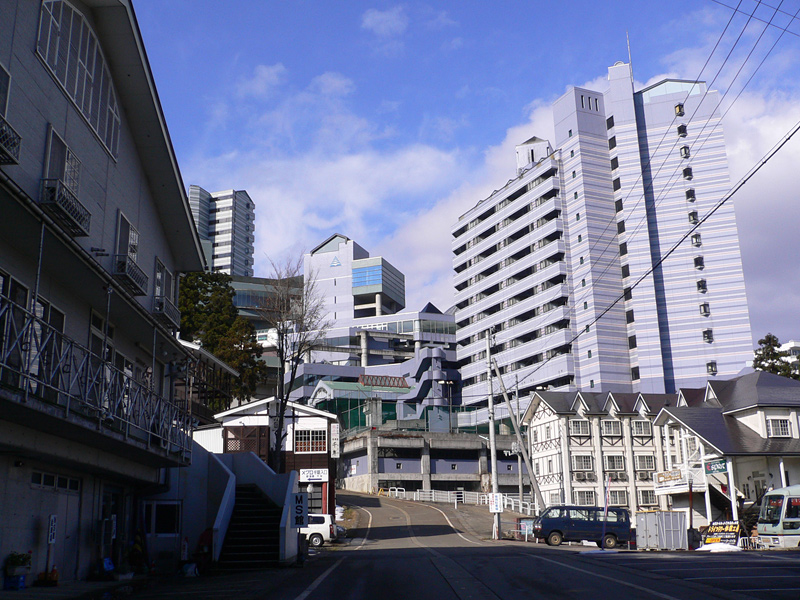
- Ishiuchi Resort area

- Flag Seal

- Location of Minamiuonuma in Niigata

- Location within Japan
- Coordinates: 37°3′55.9″N 138°52′33.9″E
- Country: Japan
- Region: Chūbu (Kōshin'etsu) (Hokuriku)
- Prefecture: Niigata

Area
  - Total: 584.55 km^{2} (225.70 sq mi)
- Elevation: 617 m (2,024 ft)

Population (December 1, 2020)
  - Total: 55,354
  - Density: 94.695/km^{2} (245.26/sq mi)
- Time zone: UTC+9 (Japan Standard Time)
  - Tree: Kobushi magnolia
  - Flower: Erythronium japonicum
- Phone number: 0250-62-2510
- Address: 180-1 Muika-machi, Minamiuonuma-shi, Niigata-ken 949-6696
- Website: Official website

Minamiuonuma (南魚沼市, Minamiuonuma-shi) is a city located in Niigata Prefecture, Japan. As of 1 December 2020, the city had an estimated population of 55,354 with 20,047 households, and a population density of 96.1 persons per km^{2}. Its total area was 584.55 square kilometres (225.70 sq mi).

== Geography ==
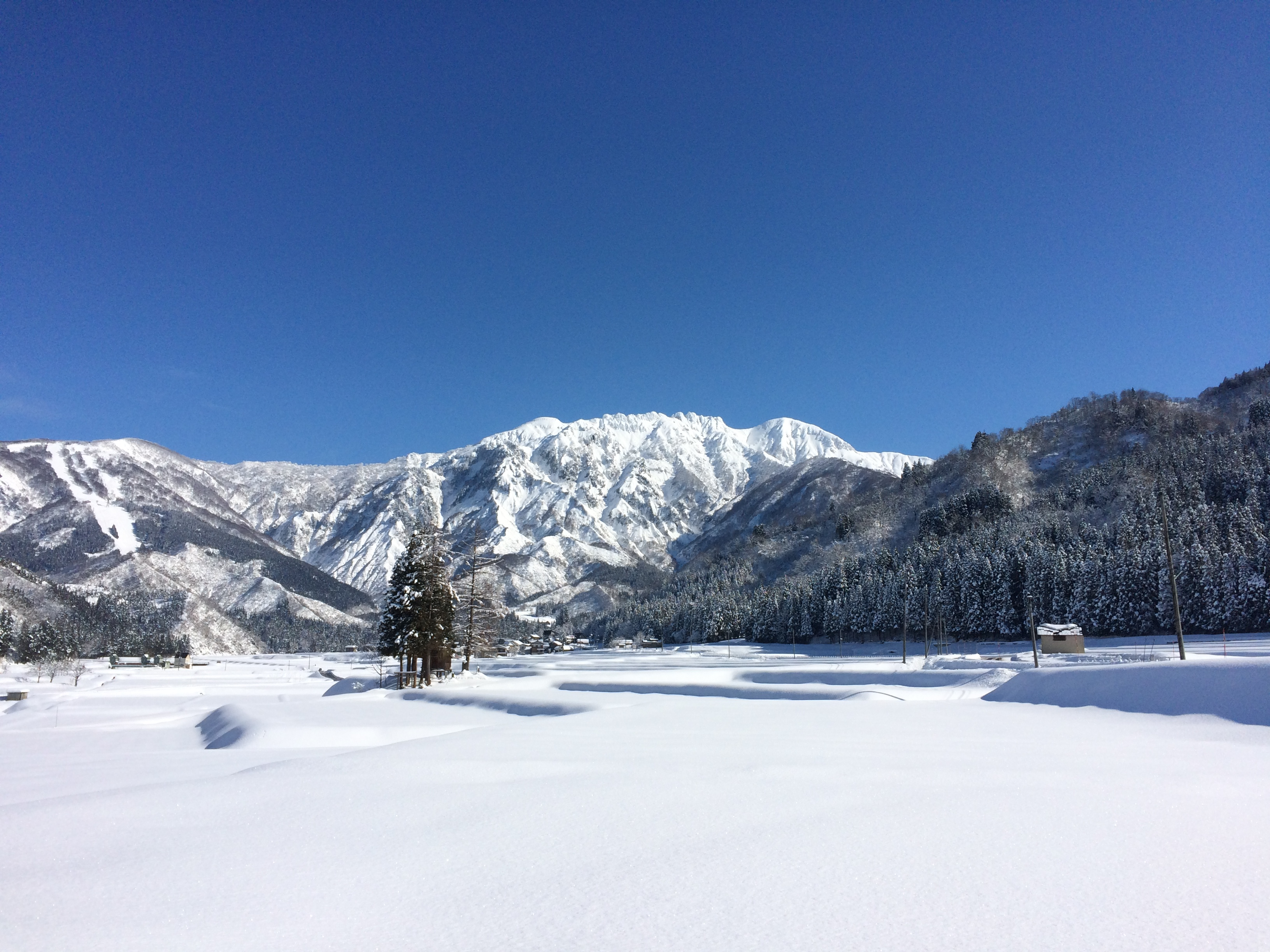
Mount Hakkai

Minamiuonuma is situated in a valley in a mountainous region of Niigata Prefecture, located on Honshu, Japan's largest and most centralised island. Dotted with ski lodges and other winter activity facilities, the city is in a region known as "Snow Country"; indeed, Minamiuonuma sits at an average elevation of around 617 m (2,024 ft) above sea level, creating a wintry climate in the coldest months of the year. The city sits just between Mount Sakado to the southeast, which measures 634 m (2,080 ft) tall, and Masugata Yama, measuring some 747 m (2,450 ft) above sea level, to the northwest. The highest peaks in the area reach well over 1600 m (5,249 ft), and some measure as high as 2000 m (approx. 6,700 ft).

Parts of the city are within the borders of the Jōshin'etsu-kōgen National Park; to the north, the city is bounded by Uonuma and the Echigo Sanzan-Tadami Quasi-National Park (and its associated mountains), and to the south by Yuzawa, a popular ski resort town. The Uono River flows through most of the city. The city and its surrounding areas are dotted with many onsen (hot springs) and ski resorts, making it a popular destination in winter. There are also a large number of seasonal paddy fields, as this is part of the major koshihikari rice-growing region in Japan. Other popular seasonal produce is grown, as well, like watermelon.

=== Surrounding municipalities ===
- Gunma Prefecture
  - Minakami
- Niigata Prefecture
  - Tōkamachi
  - Uonuma
  - Yuzawa

== Climate ==
Minamiuonuma has a humid subtropical climate (Köppen Cfa), characterised by warm, wet summers and cold winters, with heavy snowfall. The average annual rainfall is 1865 mm (73"), with September being the wettest month. The average annual temperature in the region is 11.3 °C (52.3 °F); temperatures are highest, on average, in August, at around 24.3 °C (75.7 °F), and lowest in January, at around -1.1 °C (30 °F).

== Demographics ==
According to Japanese census data, the population of Minamiuonuma peaked around 1950 and has since declined to about the same level as a century ago.

Historical population
Year	Pop.	±%
1920	51,366	—
1930	56,414	+9.8%
1940	59,970	+6.3%
1950	72,360	+20.7%
1960	68,650	−5.1%
1970	61,995	−9.7%
1980	62,830	+1.3%
1990	65,566	+4.4%
2000	65,492	−0.1%
2010	61,624	−5.9%
2020	54,851	−11.0%

== History ==
Minamiuonuma amalgamation

The area of present-day Minamiuonuma was part of the ancient Echigo Province. The village of Muikamachi was created with the establishment of the modern municipalities system on April 1, 1889, and was elevated to "town" status on July 13, 1900. The city of Minamiuonuma was established on November 1, 2004, from the merger of Muikamachi with the neighbouring town of Yamato (both from Minamiuonuma District). On October 1, 2005, the town of Shiozawa (from Minamiuonuma District) was also merged into Minamiuonuma.

== Government ==
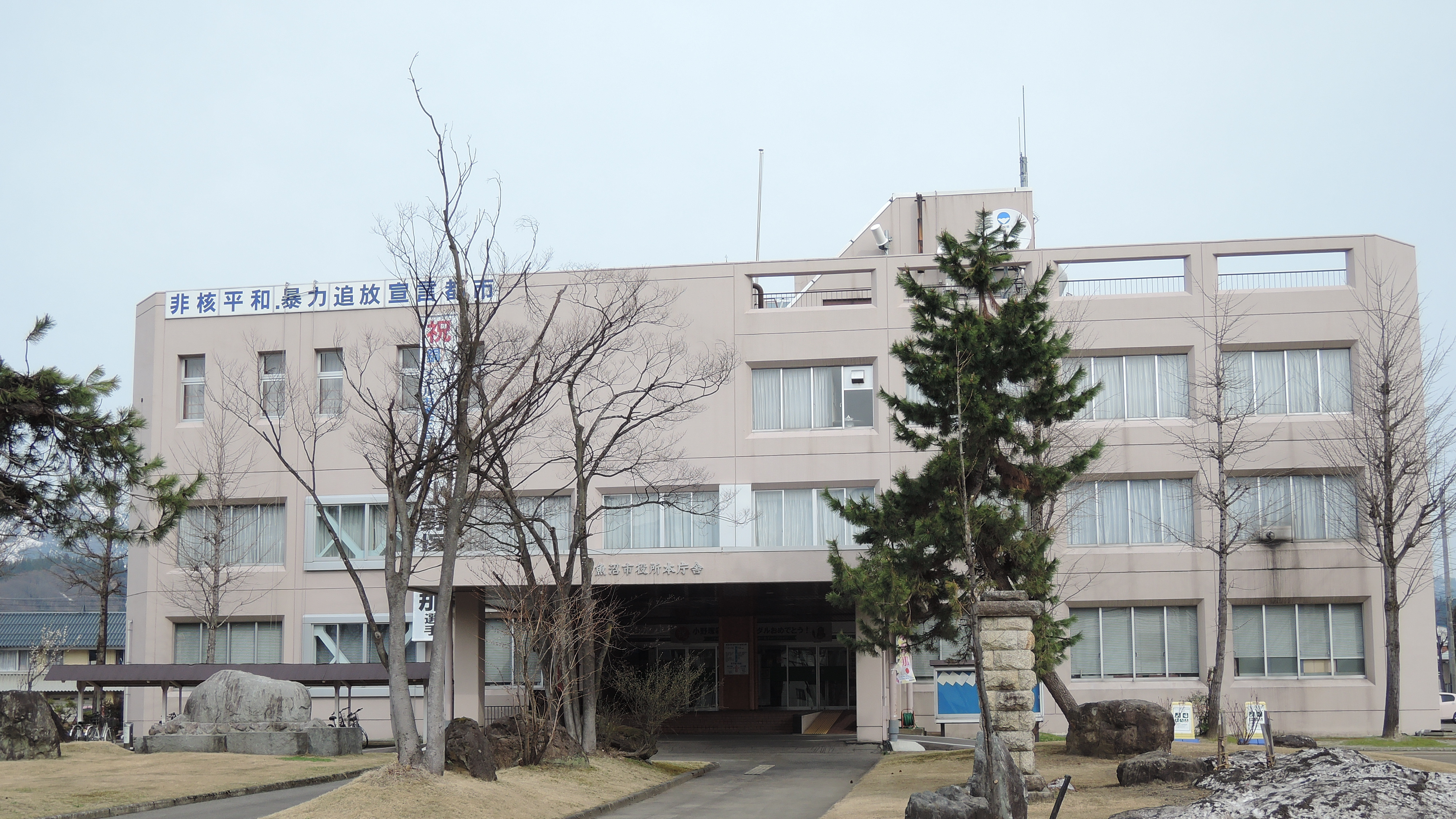
Minamiuonuma City Hall

Minamiuonuma has a mayor-council form of government with a directly elected mayor and a unicameral city legislature of 22 members. Minamiuonuma, together with the town of Yuzawa, contributes two members to the Niigata Prefectural Assembly. In terms of national politics, the city is part of Niigata 5th district of the lower house of the Diet of Japan.

== Economy ==
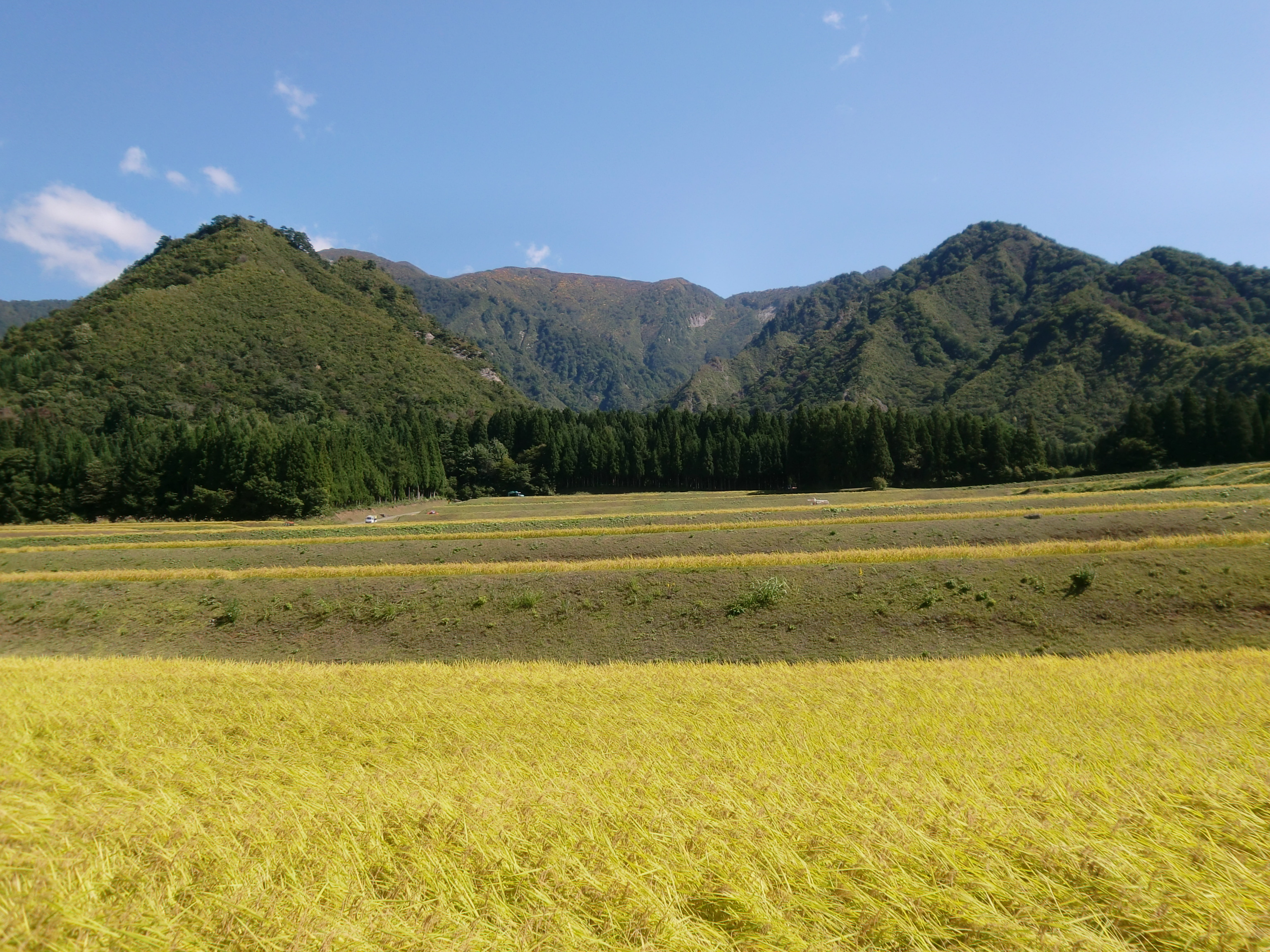
Paddy fields in Minamiuonuma

The economy of Minamiuonuma is based primarily on agriculture and seasonal tourism.

== Education ==
Minamiuonuma has 17 public elementary schools and four public middle schools operated by the city government. There are four public high schools operated by the Niigata Prefectural Board of Education, and the prefecture also operates one special education school for the handicapped. The International University of Japan is based at Minamiuonuma.

== Transportation ==
=== Railway ===
- East Japan Railway Company (JR East) - Jōetsu Shinkansen
  - Urasa
- JR East - Jōetsu Line
  - Ishiuchi - Ōsawa - Jōetsu International Skiing Ground - Shiozawa - Muikamachi - Itsukamachi - Urasa - Yairo
- Hokuetsu Express Hokuhoku Line
  - Muikamachi - Uonuma-Kyūryō

=== Highway ===
- Kan-etsu Expressway – Shiozawa-Ishiuchi IC, Muikamachi IC
- National Route 17
- National Route 253
- National Route 291
- National Route 353

== Sister cities ==
Minamiuonuma is twinned with:

- Ashburton, New Zealand, since 1987
- Lillehammer, Norway, since 1992
- Sölden, Austria, since 1982

== Local attractions ==
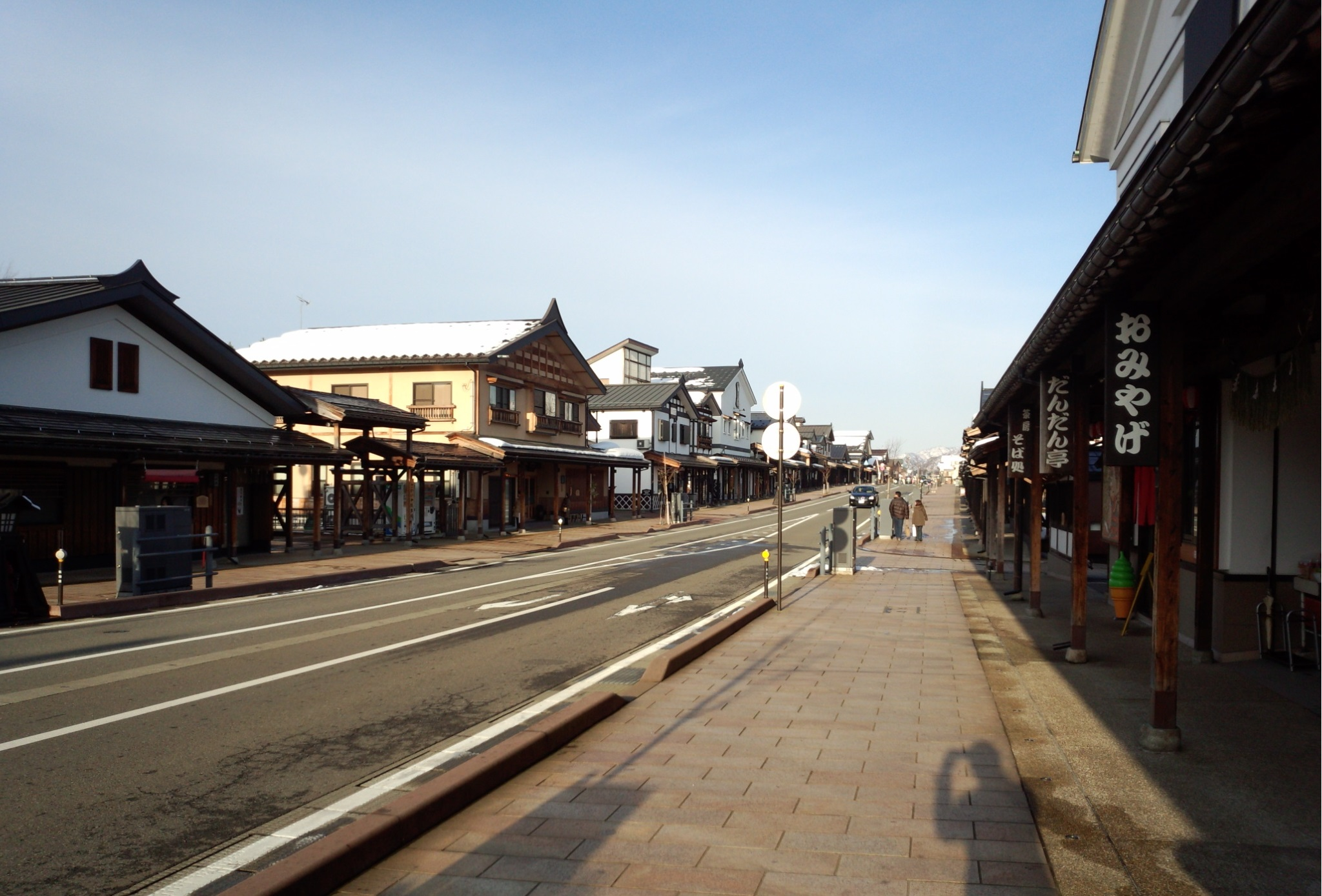
Shiozawa Bokushi-dori Street

- Hakkaisan Ropeway, aerial lift that climbs Mount Hakkai
- Sakado Castle ruins, a National Historic Site
- Shiozawajuku, old shopping street
- Untoan Temple, Buddhist temple
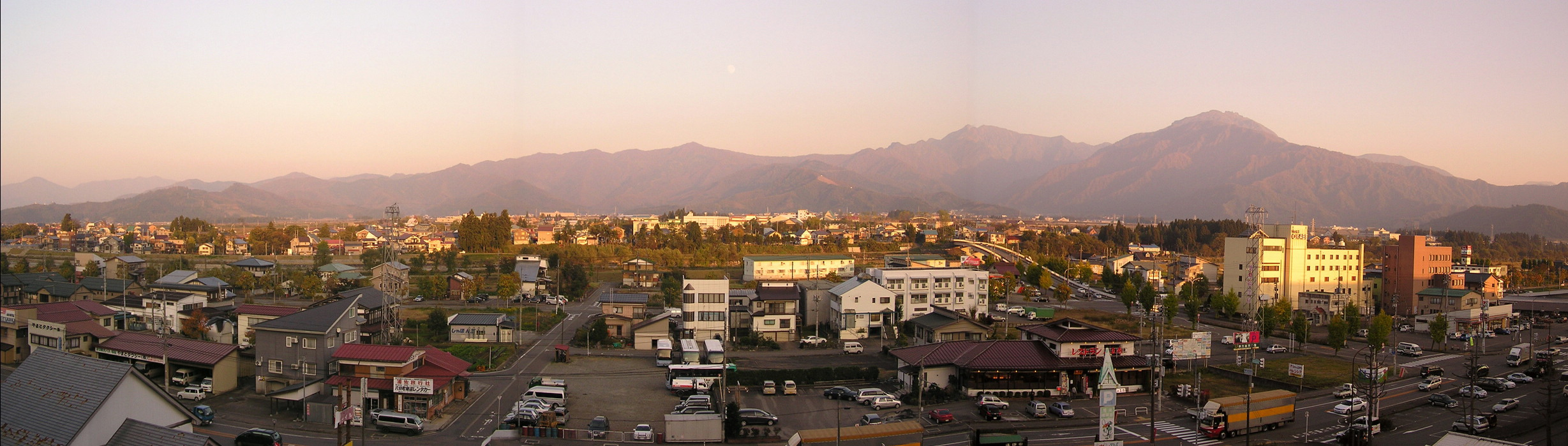
An aerial panorama of Urasa in Minami-Uonuma city with the Echigo-Sanzan mountains in the background

== Notable personalities ==
- Haruki Yoshida, footballer.
