= Ugh, Those Feels Again =

Studio album by Snoh Aalegra
- Released: 16 August 2019
- Genre: R&B
- Length: 40:17
- Label: ARTium; AWAL
- Producer: Snoh Aalegra; Maneesh; No I.D.; Big White; Cam O'bi; Dee Lilly; Nes; Rob Holladay; P2J; D'Mile; Jonah Christian; Matthew Burnett; Riley Bell; Johan Lenox; Doctor O; Steve Wyreman; Compass

Snoh Aalegra chronology
| Feels (2017) | Ugh, Those Feels Again (2019) | Temporary Highs in the Violet Skies (2021) |

Singles from Ugh, Those Feels Again
- 1. "I Want You Around" Released: 18 February 2019; 2. "You" Released: 1 April 2019; 3. "Find Someone Like You" Released: 14 June 2019; 4. "Situationship" Released: 2 August 2019; 5. "Whoa" Released: 14 February 2020

Ugh, Those Feels Again (stylized as - Ugh, those feels again) is the second studio album by Swedish singer Snoh Aalegra. It was released on 16 August 2019 through ARTium.

== Music ==
Ugh, Those Feels Again is considered to be a sequel to Feels, similar in mood and theme. The album was described as "cinematic soul" by Aalegra and is predominantly an R&B album with elements of soul, and rap.

== Release and promotion ==
Ugh, Those Feels Again was released for Digital download and streaming on 16 August 2019 by ARTium Recordings. On 3 February 2020, a standard and limited edition of the album was released on vinyl.

== Critical reception ==
Professional ratings
Aggregate scores
| Source | Rating |
|---|---|
| Metacritic | 73/100 |
Review scores
| Source | Rating |
| Clash | 8/10 |
| Exclaim! | 7/10 |
| The Line of Best Fit | 7/10 |
| Pitchfork | 7.1/10 |
| Q | 3/5 stars |

Upon its release, Ugh, Those Feels Again received generally positive reviews from most music critics. At Metacritic, which assigns a weighted mean rating out of 100 to reviews from music critics, the album received an aggregate score of 73.

== Track listing ==
Ugh, Those Feels Again track listing
| No. | Title | Writer(s) | Producer | Length |
|---|---|---|---|---|
| 1. | "Here Now (Intro)" | Snoh Aalegra; Harold Lilly | Maneesh; No I.D.; Snoh Aalegra | 0:47 |
| 2. | "I Want You Around" | Aalegra; Marcus James | Big White; Cam O'bi; Dee Lilly; Nes; Rob Holladay | 3:32 |
| 3. | "Situationship" | Aalegra; Ariowa Irosogie; Nathaniel Warner | P2J | 3:35 |
| 4. | "Whoa" | Aalegra | D'Mile | 3:19 |
| 5. | "Find Someone Like You" | Aalegra; James | Jonah Christian | 3:26 |
| 6. | "Toronto" | Aalegra; James; Matthew Burnett; Riley Bell | Burnett; Bell | 2:57 |
| 7. | "Love Like That" | Aalegra; Hue Wayne Strother II | Johan Lenox; No I.D. | 3:15 |
| 8. | "Be Careful" | Aalegra; Malik Yusef | Doctor O; Maneesh | 1:48 |
| 9. | "Charleville 9200, Pt. II" | Aalegra; James | No I.D.; Steve Wyreman | 2:59 |
| 10. | "You" | Aalegra; Joel Compass | Compass | 3:24 |
| 11. | "Njoy" | Aalegra; James | Doctor O | 1:21 |
| 12. | "Nothing to Me" | Aalegra; James; Luke James | Maneesh; No I.D. | 3:24 |
| 13. | "I Didn't Mean to Fall in Love" | Aalegra | Maneesh; No I.D. | 3:22 |
| 14. | "Peace" | Aalegra; James | No I.D.; Steve Wyreman | 3:03 |
| Total length: | | | | 40:17 |

== Charts ==
Chart performance for Ugh, Those Feels Again
| Chart (2019) | Peak position |
|---|---|
| Canadian Albums (Billboard) | 100 |
| US Billboard 200 | 73 |
| US Top R&B/Hip-Hop Albums (Billboard) | 39 |

== Release history ==
List of release dates, showing region, formats, label, editions and reference
| Region | Date | Format(s) | Label | Ref. |
|---|---|---|---|---|
| Various | 16 August 2019 | Digital download; streaming | ARTium Recordings | |
