= Yuzawa, Niigata =

Yuzawa 湯沢町
- Town
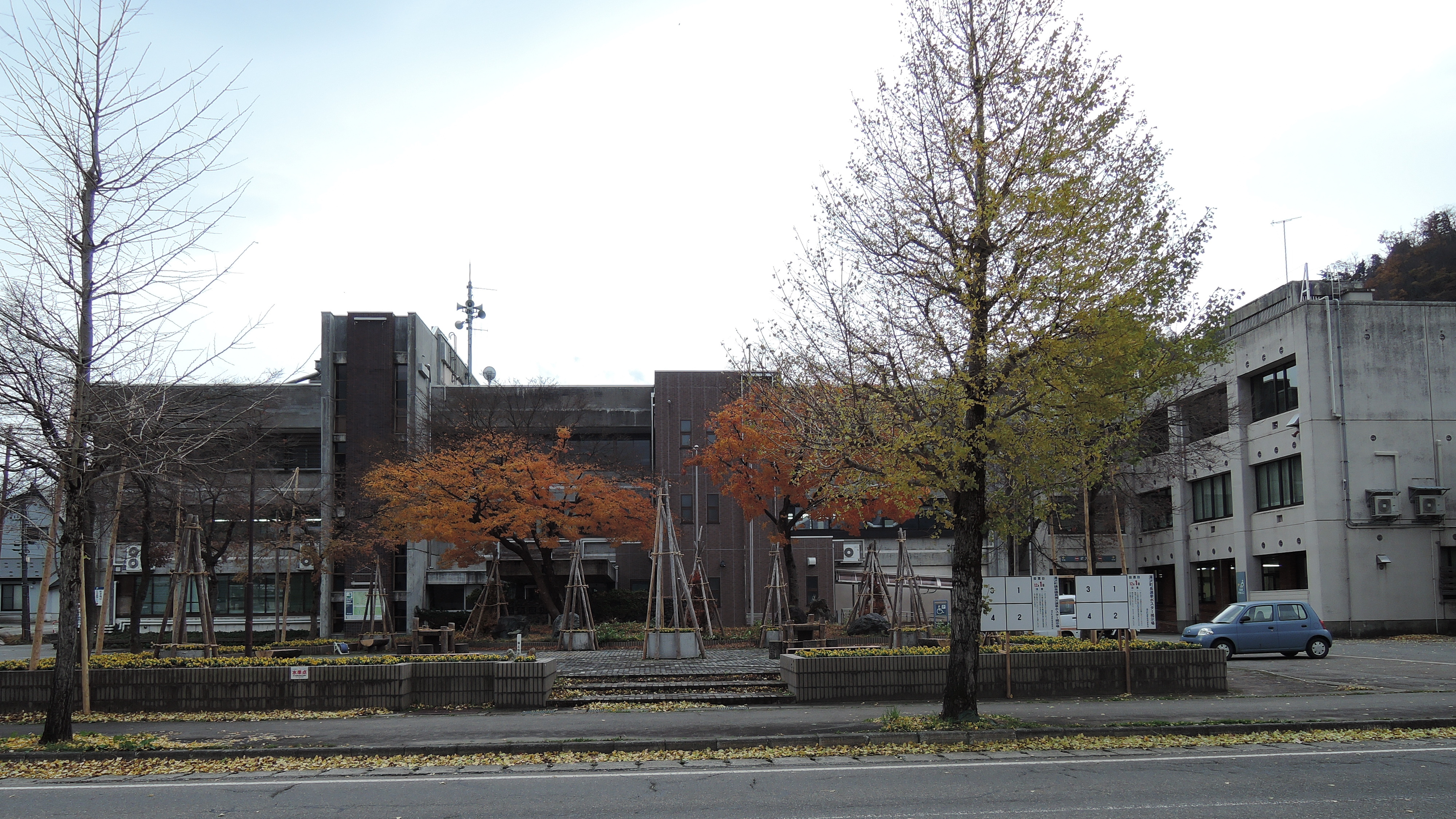
- Yuzawa town hall

- Flag Emblem

- Location of Yuzawa in Niigata

- Coordinates: 36°56′2.4″N 138°49′2.8″E
- Country: Japan
- Region: Chūbu (Kōshin'etsu) (Hokuriku)
- Prefecture: Niigata
- District: Minamiuonuma

Area
  - Total: 357.29 km^{2} (137.95 sq mi)

Population (1 July 2019)
  - Total: 7,926
  - Density: 22.18/km^{2} (57.46/sq mi)
- Time zone: UTC+9 (Japan Standard Time)
- Phone number: 025-784-3451
- Address: 300 Kandatsu, Yuzawa-machi, Minami-Uonuma-gun, Niigata-ken 949-6192
- Climate: Cfa
- Website: Official website
- Symbols
- Flower: Cosmos
- Tree: Prunus sargentii

Yuzawa (湯沢町, Yuzawa-machi) is a town located in Niigata Prefecture, Japan. As of 1 July 2019, the town had an estimated population of 7,926, and a population density of 22.2 persons per km^{2}. The total area of the town was 357.29 square kilometres (137.95 sq mi). The town is famous for its hot springs, ski resorts and Snow country.

== Geography ==
Yuzawa is located in southwestern Niigata Prefecture, in a mountainous area bordering northern Nagano Prefecture and northern Gunma Prefecture. Due to its geographical location between the Sea of Japan and the surrounding Japanese Alps it has one of the highest annual snowfalls in Japan. There are numerous ski resorts within the region. Mount Naeba (2143 meters) is partly located within the town limits. Much of the town is within the borders of either the Jōshin'etsu-kōgen National Park or the Uonuma Renpo Prefectural Park.

=== Surrounding municipalities ===
- Gunma Prefecture
  - Minakami
  - Nakanojō
- Nagano Prefecture
  - Sakae
- Niigata Prefecture
  - Minamiuonuma
  - Tōkamachi
  - Tsunan

== Climate ==
Yuzawa has a humid continental climate (Köppen Dfa) characterized by warm, wet summers and cold winters with heavy snowfall. The average annual temperature in Yuzawa is 11.7 °C (53.1 °F). The average annual rainfall is 2,301.9 mm (90.63 in) with September as the wettest month. The temperatures are highest on average in August, at around 24.7 °C (76.5 °F), and lowest in January, at around −0.4 °C (31.3 °F).

Climate data for Yuzawa (1991–2020 normals, extremes 1978–present)
Month	Jan	Feb	Mar	Apr	May	Jun	Jul	Aug	Sep	Oct	Nov	Dec	Year
Record high °C (°F)	15.5 (59.9)	17.8 (64.0)	23.2 (73.8)	29.4 (84.9)	34.1 (93.4)	35.4 (95.7)	36.6 (97.9)	37.2 (99.0)	35.2 (95.4)	31.0 (87.8)	25.3 (77.5)	21.5 (70.7)	37.2 (99.0)
Mean daily maximum °C (°F)	2.8 (37.0)	3.6 (38.5)	7.7 (45.9)	15.3 (59.5)	21.9 (71.4)	25.0 (77.0)	28.5 (83.3)	29.9 (85.8)	25.4 (77.7)	19.1 (66.4)	12.8 (55.0)	6.1 (43.0)	16.5 (61.7)
Daily mean °C (°F)	−0.4 (31.3)	−0.1 (31.8)	3.0 (37.4)	9.2 (48.6)	15.7 (60.3)	19.9 (67.8)	23.5 (74.3)	24.7 (76.5)	20.5 (68.9)	14.3 (57.7)	7.9 (46.2)	2.3 (36.1)	11.7 (53.1)
Mean daily minimum °C (°F)	−3.2 (26.2)	−3.4 (25.9)	−0.9 (30.4)	3.9 (39.0)	10.1 (50.2)	15.4 (59.7)	19.7 (67.5)	20.6 (69.1)	16.6 (61.9)	10.3 (50.5)	3.9 (39.0)	−0.7 (30.7)	7.7 (45.9)
Record low °C (°F)	−12.6 (9.3)	−11.5 (11.3)	−10.6 (12.9)	−5.6 (21.9)	0.7 (33.3)	6.2 (43.2)	11.6 (52.9)	13.1 (55.6)	6.2 (43.2)	0.1 (32.2)	−6.6 (20.1)	−9.8 (14.4)	−12.6 (9.3)
Average precipitation mm (inches)	314.9 (12.40)	213.3 (8.40)	165.4 (6.51)	109.6 (4.31)	99.7 (3.93)	135.3 (5.33)	214.3 (8.44)	204.5 (8.05)	175.5 (6.91)	177.7 (7.00)	194.7 (7.67)	309.3 (12.18)	2,301.9 (90.63)
Average snowfall cm (inches)	377 (148)	288 (113)	159 (63)	20 (7.9)	0 (0)	0 (0)	0 (0)	0 (0)	0 (0)	0 (0)	12 (4.7)	210 (83)	1,054 (415)
Average precipitation days (≥ 1.0 mm)	24.0	20.0	20.0	13.5	11.9	13.4	15.7	13.9	14.4	14.9	17.3	21.9	200.5
Mean monthly sunshine hours	45.8	62.3	95.2	149.0	189.4	140.1	129.1	164.1	111.7	107.6	88.9	63.5	1,346.7
Source: Japan Meteorological Agency (1991–2020 normals, extremes 1978–present)

== Demographics ==
Per Japanese census data, the population of Yuzawa has declined over the past 30 years.

Historical population
Year	Pop.	±%
1970	8,374	—
1980	9,514	+13.6%
1990	9,986	+5.0%
2000	9,130	−8.6%
2010	8,396	−8.0%
2020	7,767	−7.5%

== History ==
The area of present-day Yuzawa was part of ancient Echigo Province. The villages of Yuzawa, Futai (二居村, Futai-mura), Asakai (浅貝村, Asakai-mura), Kandatsu (神立村, Kandatsu-mura), Tsuchidaru (土樽村, Tsuchidaru-mura), and Mitsumata (三俣村, Mitsumata-mura) were created on 1 April 1889 as part of the modern municipalities system. On 1 November 1901, Futai and Asakai merged to become the village of Mikuni (三国村, Mikuni-mura). Yuzawa, Mikuni, Kandatsu, Tsuchidaru, and Mitsumata merged on 1 April 1955 to become the town of Yuzawa.

== Education ==
Yuzawa has one public elementary school and one public middle school operated by the town government. The town no longer has a high school.

== Transportation ==
=== Railway ===
– Jōetsu Shinkansen

- Echigo-Yuzawa - Gala Yuzawa

JR East - Jōetsu Line

- Tsuchitaru - Echigo-Nakazato - Iwappara-Ski-jō-mae - Echigo-Yuzawa

Hokuhoku Express - Hokuhoku Line

- Echigo-Yuzawa

=== Highway ===
- Kan-Etsu Expressway
- National Route 17
- National Route 353

== Local attractions ==
=== Ski resorts ===
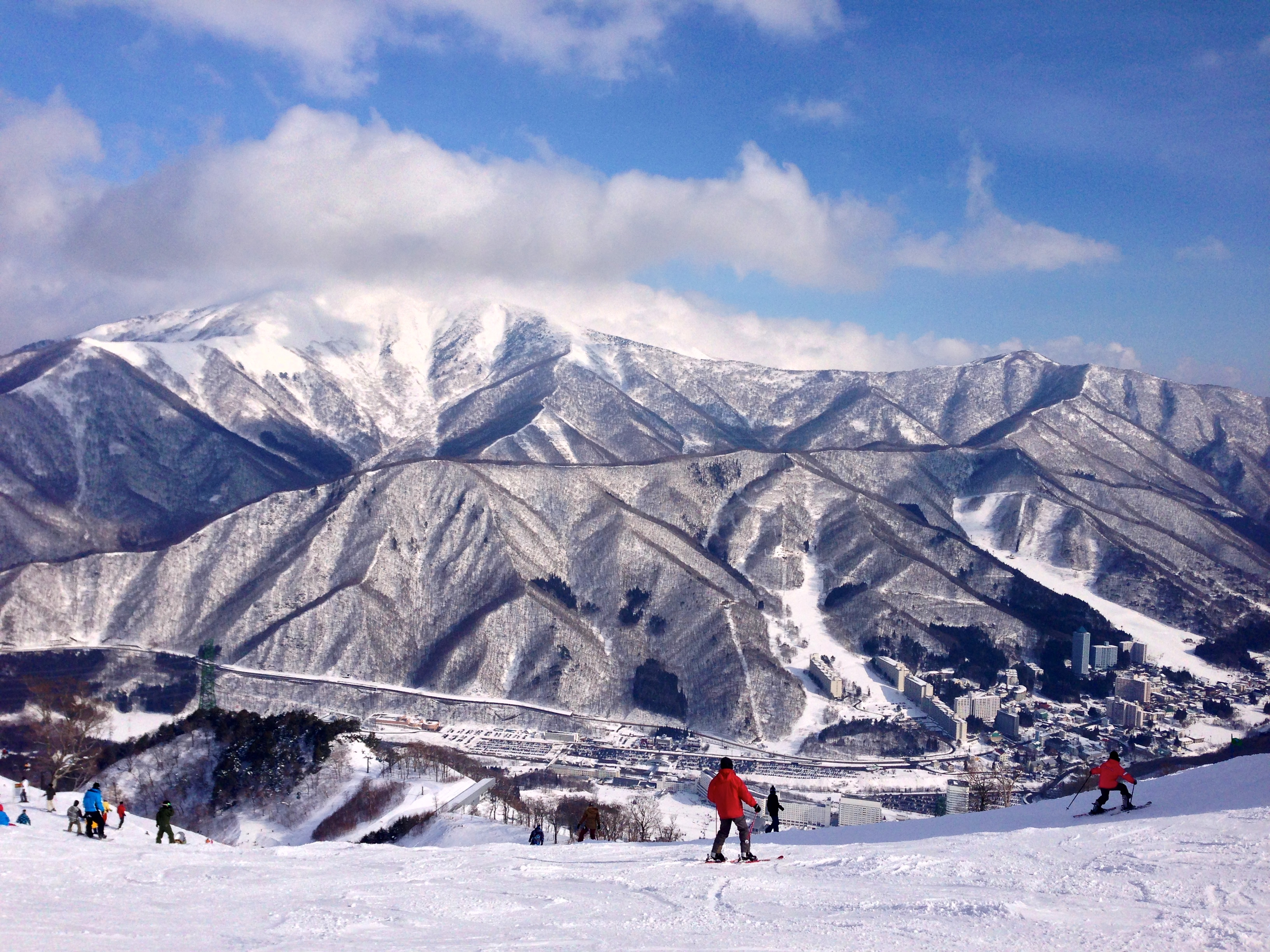
Naeba Ski Resort

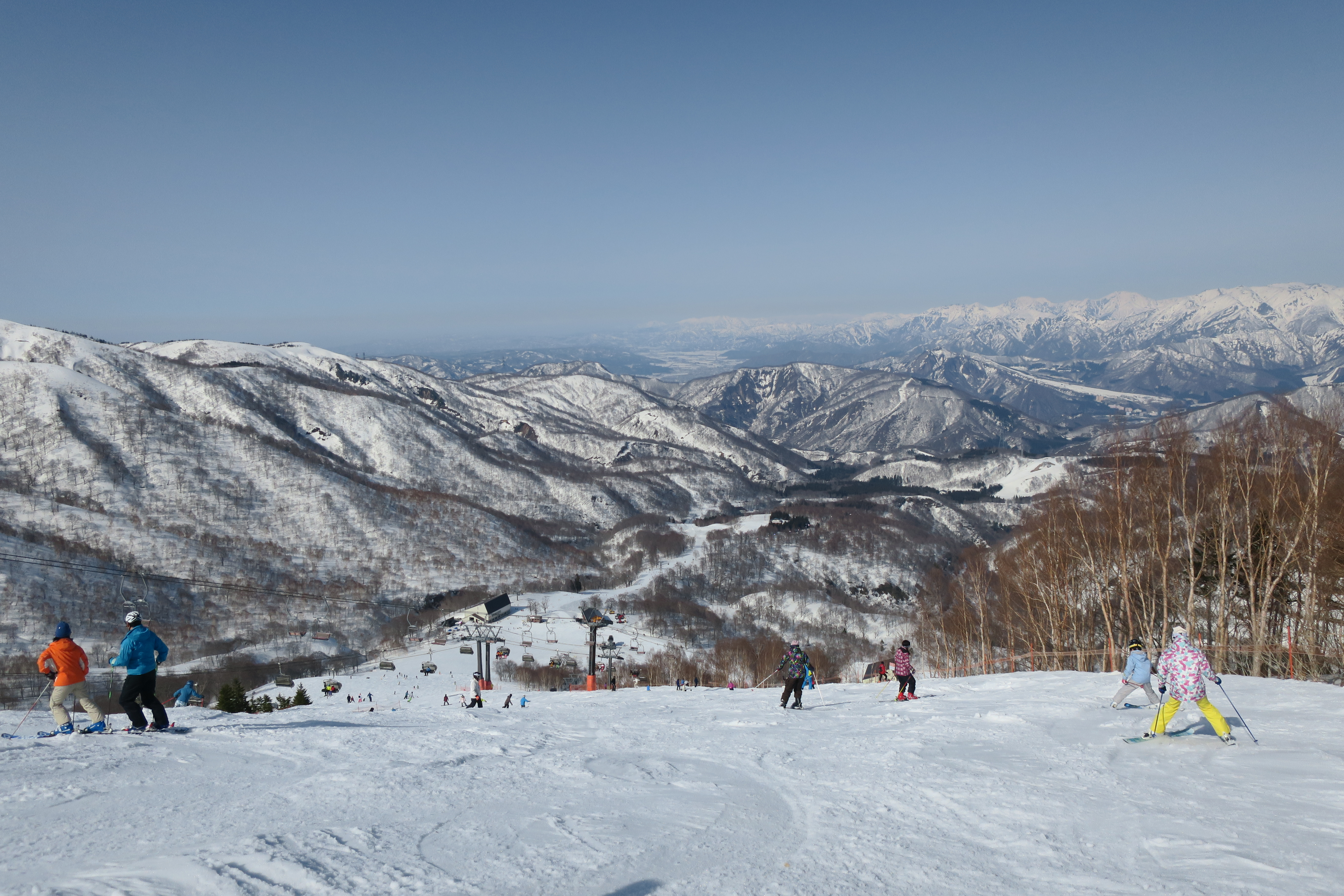
Kagura Ski Resort

There are many ski resorts in Yuzawa and the surrounding area of Minamiuonuma and Minakami. The town is served by the Echigo-Yuzawa and Gala-Yuzawa stations on the Jōetsu Shinkansen line, making it one of the most accessible winter sports areas from Tokyo, and the town's economy is mainly based on skiing and snowboarding. There are 10 ski resorts in Yuzawa, and the most frequent users for the 2023-2024 season were Naeba Ski Resort, GALA Yuzawa Ski Resort, Iwappara Ski Resort, and Kagura Ski Resort, in that order.

Once a year, the Fuji Rock Festival, Japan's largest outdoor music event, is held at Naeba Ski Resort.

Number of visitors to each resort for the 2023-2024 season.
Ski resorts	Number of visitors
Naeba	309,400
Gala Yuzawa	259,250
Iwappara	255,000
Kagura	244,170
Kandatsu	219,510
Yuzawa Nakazato	164,150
NASPA	107,580
Yuzawa Kogen	73,910
Nakazato Snow Wood	64,390
Yuzawa Park	25,780

=== Onsen and onsen ryokan ===
Yuzawa has at least 27 onsen (hot springs ) and onsen ryokan (traditional inns with onsen). The most famous of these is Kaikake Onsen (ja), which first appeared in documents in the 1400s. During the Sengoku Period, Uesugi Kenshin had his troops bathe in the onsen to heal their wounds. During the Edo period, it was popular as a hot spring that cured eye diseases.

Akayu Onsen is a hidden onsen located along a mountain stream southeast of Mount Naeba and is reached by a 2.5-hour hike.

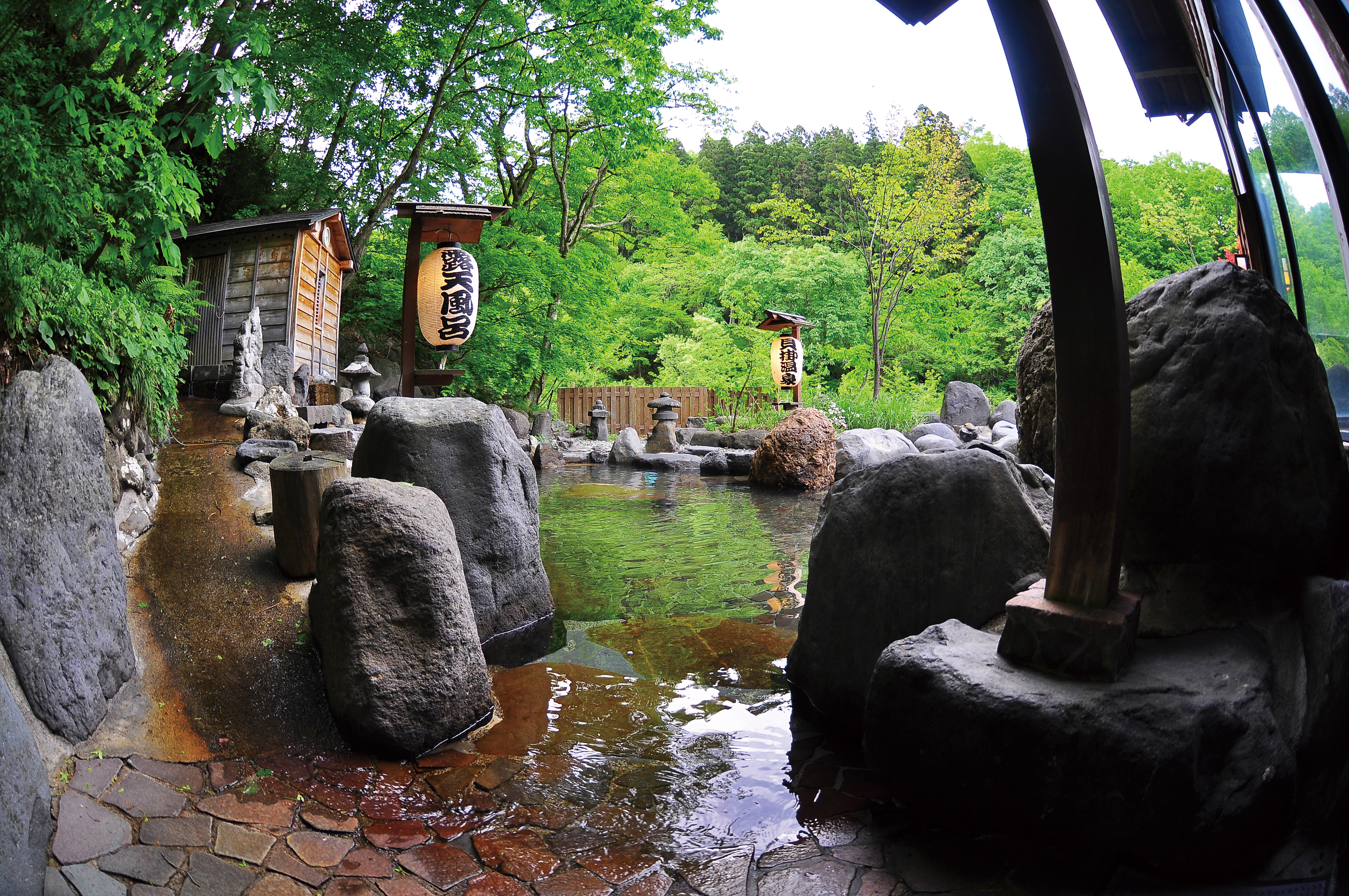
Kaikake Onsen

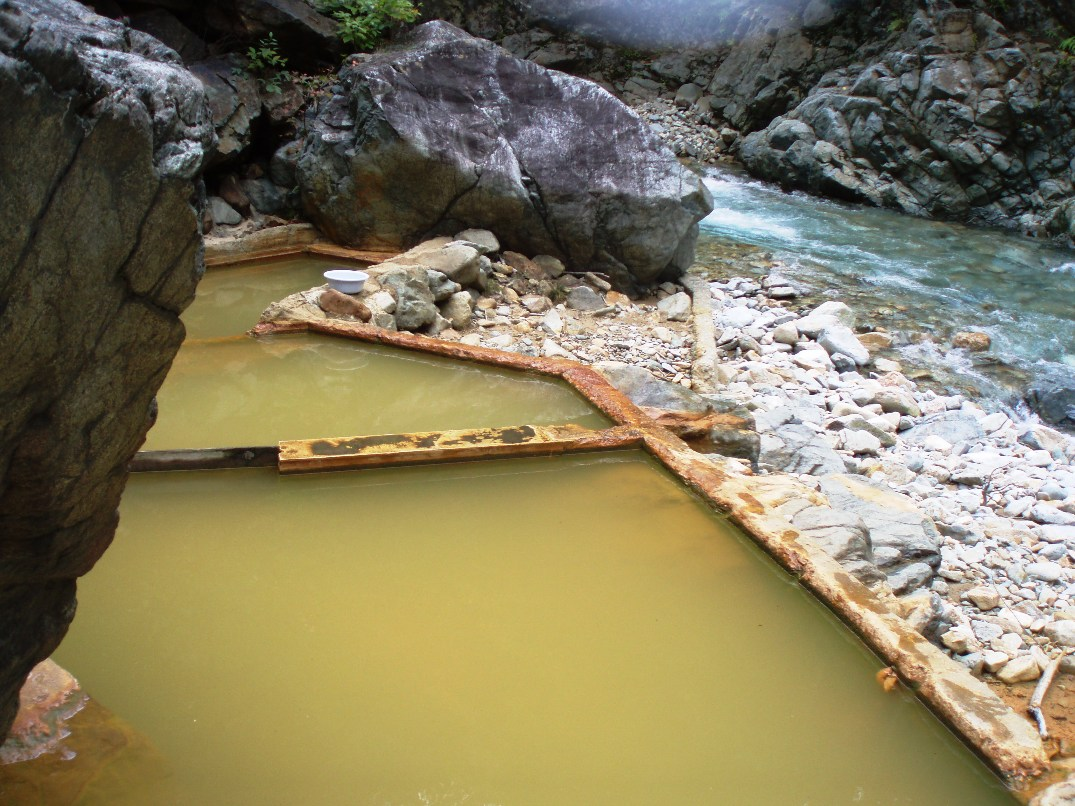
Akayu Onsen

=== Ponshu-kan ===
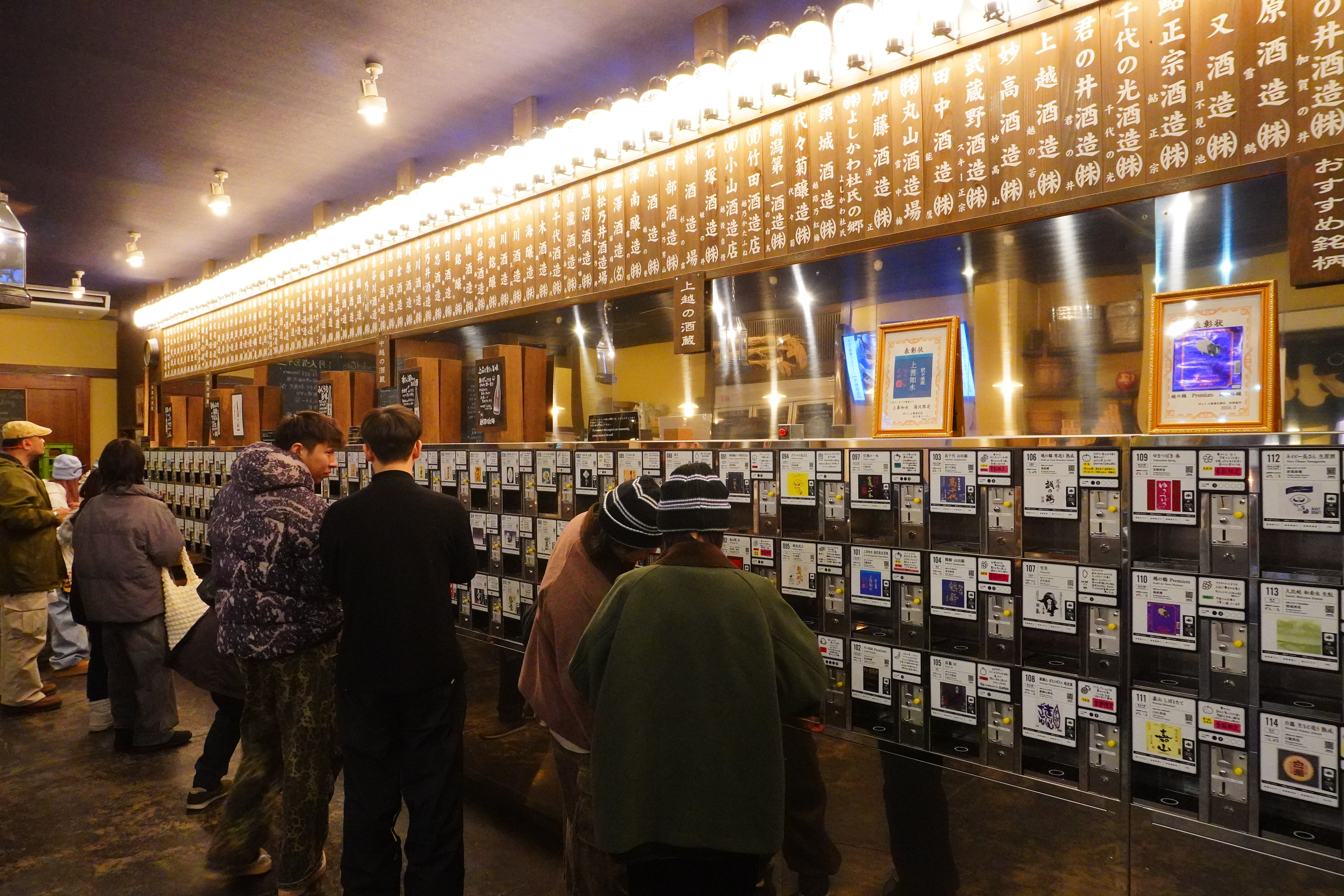
Pomshu-kan

Niigata Prefecture is famous for its sake, and there is a sake-themed facility outside the ticket gates of Echigo-Yuzawa Station that has become a tourist attraction. At the facility, called "Ponshu-kan" (meaning "Sake House"), visitors receive 5 coins for every 500 yen they spend, which they can put into vending machines to sample nearly 130 brands of Niigata Prefecture sake. Sake can also be purchased and visitors can take a bath in a onsen filled with sake.

== Cultural references ==
Yasunari Kawabata's classic novel Snow Country takes place in Yuzawa.

== See also ==
- Takahan Ryokan – an historic inn located in Yuzawa
