= Minami-Uonuma District, Niigata =

District in Niigata prefecture, Japan

Coordinates: 36.869°N 138.817°E

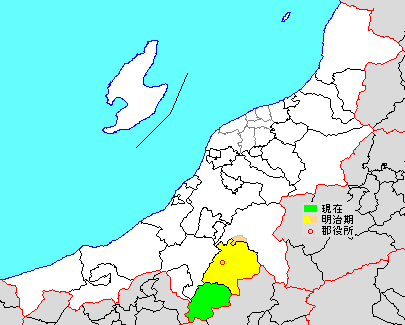
Map showing original extent of Minamiuonuma District in Niigata Prefecture: * yellow - areas formerly within the district borders during the early Meiji period * green - current borders: 1. Yuzawa-machi

Minami-Uonuma (南魚沼郡, Minami-Uonuma-gun) is a district located in Niigata Prefecture, Japan.

As of July 1, 2019, the district has an estimated population of 7,926 with a density of 22.2 persons per km^{2}. The total area is 50.03 km^{2}.

== Municipalities ==
The district consists of only one town:

- Yuzawa (Note: Classified as a town.)

== History ==
=== Recent mergers ===
- On November 1, 2004 - The towns of Muika and Yamato were merged to form the city of Minamiuonuma.
- On October 1, 2005 - The town of Shiozawa was also merged into expanded city of Minamiuonuma.
