= Shin-shimizu Tunnel =

Railway tunnel in Honshu, Japan

Shin-shimizu Railway Tunnel
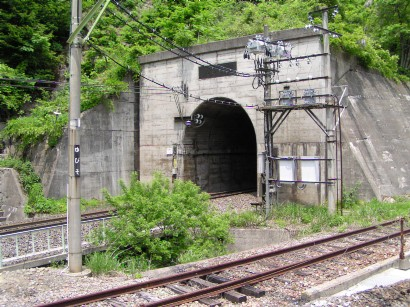
- Entrance of Shin-shimizu Tunnel (seen from Takasaki-Gunma side)
- Interactive map of Shin-shimizu Railway Tunnel

Overview
- Line: Joetsu Line
- Location: Yuzawa, Niigata–Minakami, Gunma
- Coordinates: 36°49′6.5568″N 138°58′23.6208″E
- Status: active

Operation
- Opened: 1967
- Operator: East Japan Railway Company
- Traffic: Railway
- Character: Passenger and freight

Technical
- Line length: 13,500 m (44,300 ft)
- No. of tracks: 1

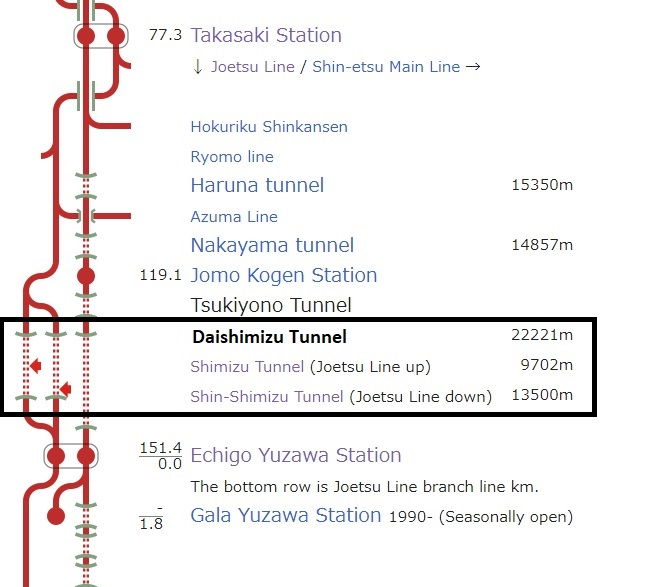
3 railway-tunnels under Mount Tanigawa: Shimizu Tunnel, Shin-shimizu Tunnel and Daishimizu Tunnel.

Shin-shimizu Tunnel (新清水トンネル, Shin-shimizu tonneru) is one way tunnel towards Niigata on JR's Joetsu Line located between Yuzawa town in Niigata Prefecture and Minakami town in Gunma Prefecture in parallel to other one-way Shimizu Tunnel (towards Tokyo) with total length of 13.5 km (8.4 mi). It was built and completed in 1967 under Mount Tanigawa that has 3 railway-tunnels: single-track Shin-shimizu & Shimizu tunnels for Joetsu Line, and double-track Daishimizu Tunnel for Joetsu Shinkansen line. A distinctive station known as Doai Station features a platform situated within an underground tunnel, specifically positioned within the middle of the Shin-Shimizu Tunnel.

== See also ==
- List of tunnels in Japan
- Seikan Tunnel undersea tunnel between Honshu-Hokkaido islands
- Kanmon Railway Tunnel undersea tunnel between Honshu-Kyushu islands
- Sakhalin–Hokkaido Tunnel proposed undersea tunnel between Russia and Japan
- Bohai Strait tunnel proposed undersea tunnel in Yellow Sea, China
