= Doai Station =

Railway station in Minakami, Gunma Prefecture, Japan

Doai Station 土合駅
- Doai Station entrance in May 2022

General information
- Location: 218-2 Yubiso, Minakami Town, Tone District, Gunma Prefecture 379-1728; Japan
- Coordinates: 36°49′52.8″N 138°58′1.6″E
- Operator: JR East
- Line: Jōetsu Line
- Distance: 69.3 km (43.1 mi) from Takasaki
- Platforms: 2 side platforms
- Tracks: 2

Construction
- Structure type: At grade and underground
- Depth: 70 m (230 ft)
- Platform levels: 2

Other information
- Status: Unstaffed
- Website: Official website

History
- Opened: 19 December 1936; 89 years ago

Passengers
- FY2013: 19 daily

Services
Preceding station	JR East	Following station
Yubiso towards Takasaki	Jōetsu Line	Tsuchitaru towards Nagaoka
Location
- Location within Gunma Prefecture Location within Kanto Area Location within Japan

Doai Station (土合駅, Doai-eki) is a passenger railway station in the town of Minakami, Gunma, Japan, operated by the East Japan Railway Company (JR East). It is jokingly known as "Japan's Number One Mole Station" (日本一のモグラ駅, Nippon ichi no mogura eki) because passengers must make a 10 minute descent down 486 steps into a tunnel in order to reach the northbound platform. It is the deepest train station in Japan.

== Lines ==
Doai Station is served by the Joetsu Line, and lies 69.3 km (43.1 mi) from the starting point of the line at Takasaki.

== Services ==
As of January 2024, there are 8 services per day in each direction, with gaps of 1–3 hours between services. Southbound services operate to Minakami while northbound services operate to Nagaoka. All services are Local trains, stopping at every station. Freight trains (hauled by electric locomotives) also use both platforms.

== Station layout ==
Doai Station is unusual in that it has two single side platforms which are located approximately 400 metres (1,300 feet) from each other – one of which is at ground level, and the other is located 70 metres (230 ft) underground within the Shin-shimizu Tunnel.

The underground platform (for northbound trains to Echigo-Yuzawa and Nagaoka) is located 70 metres (230 ft) underground, in the middle of the 13,500-metre (44,300-foot) long Shin-Shimizu Tunnel. It is only reachable by descending 486 stairs, as there are no elevators or escalators. Access from the ticket gate is through a 143 m (469 ft) covered connecting passageway (with two small flights of stairs with 12 steps each) which crosses both National Route 291 and the Yuhiso River, then entering a tunnel and descending another 462 steps to the platform.

The underground platform, which takes 10 minutes to reach on foot from the ticket gate, has a small waiting room. It used to have a toilet but it was closed around 2022.

The above-ground platform for southbound trains (to Minakami) is at ground level. It is accessible from the ticket gate, i.e. features no steps, although there are stairs at the entrance to the station building.

The station has been unattended since 14 March 1985. There are no ticket machines, only a boarding certificate issuing machine. Suica and other IC cards cannot be used at the station.

=== Platforms ===
1 (underground)	■ Joetsu Line	Northbound for Echigo-Yuzawa, Urasa and Nagaoka
2 (aboveground)	■ Joetsu Line	Southbound for Minakami

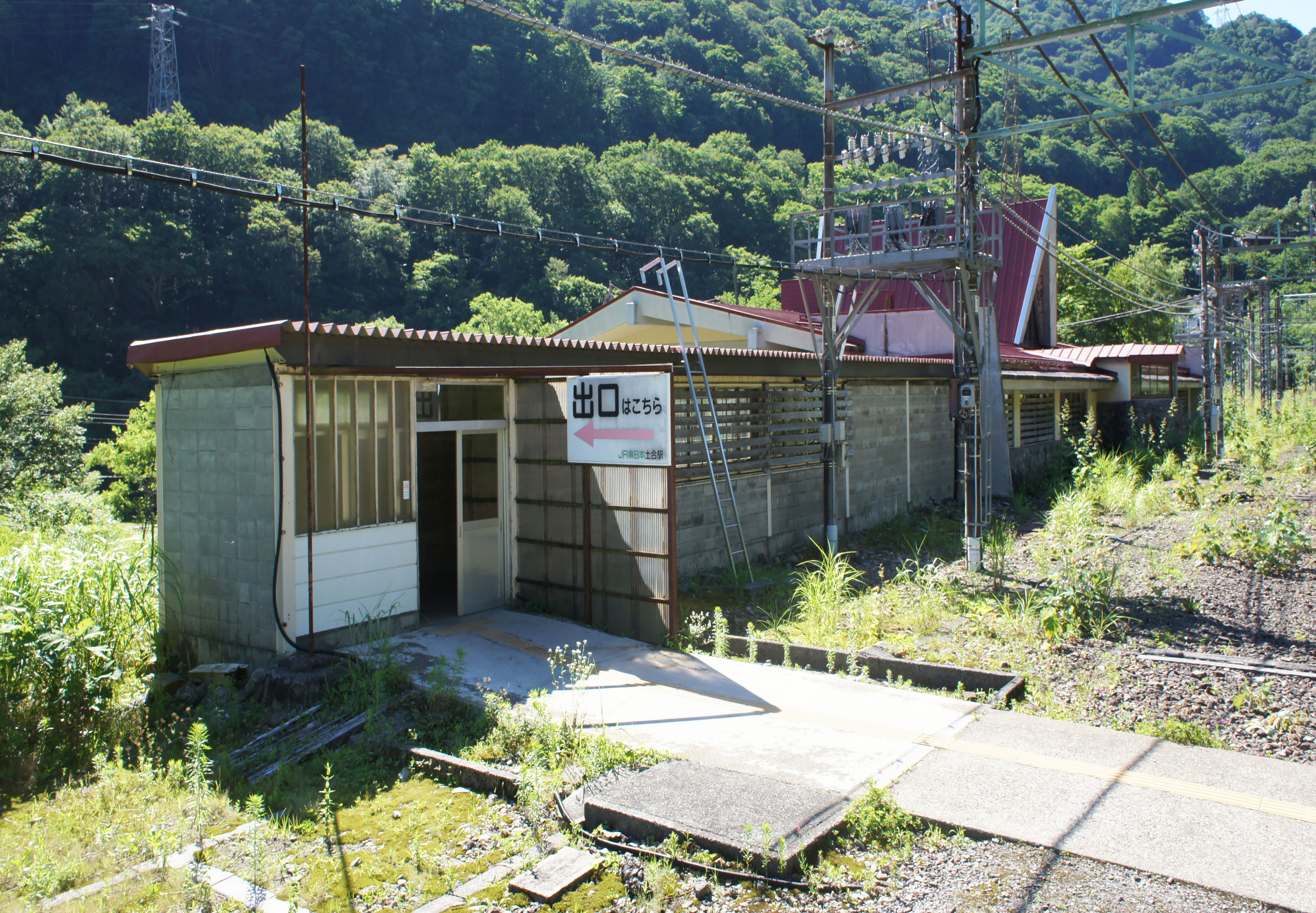
Station building seen from the ground-level platform, July 2021

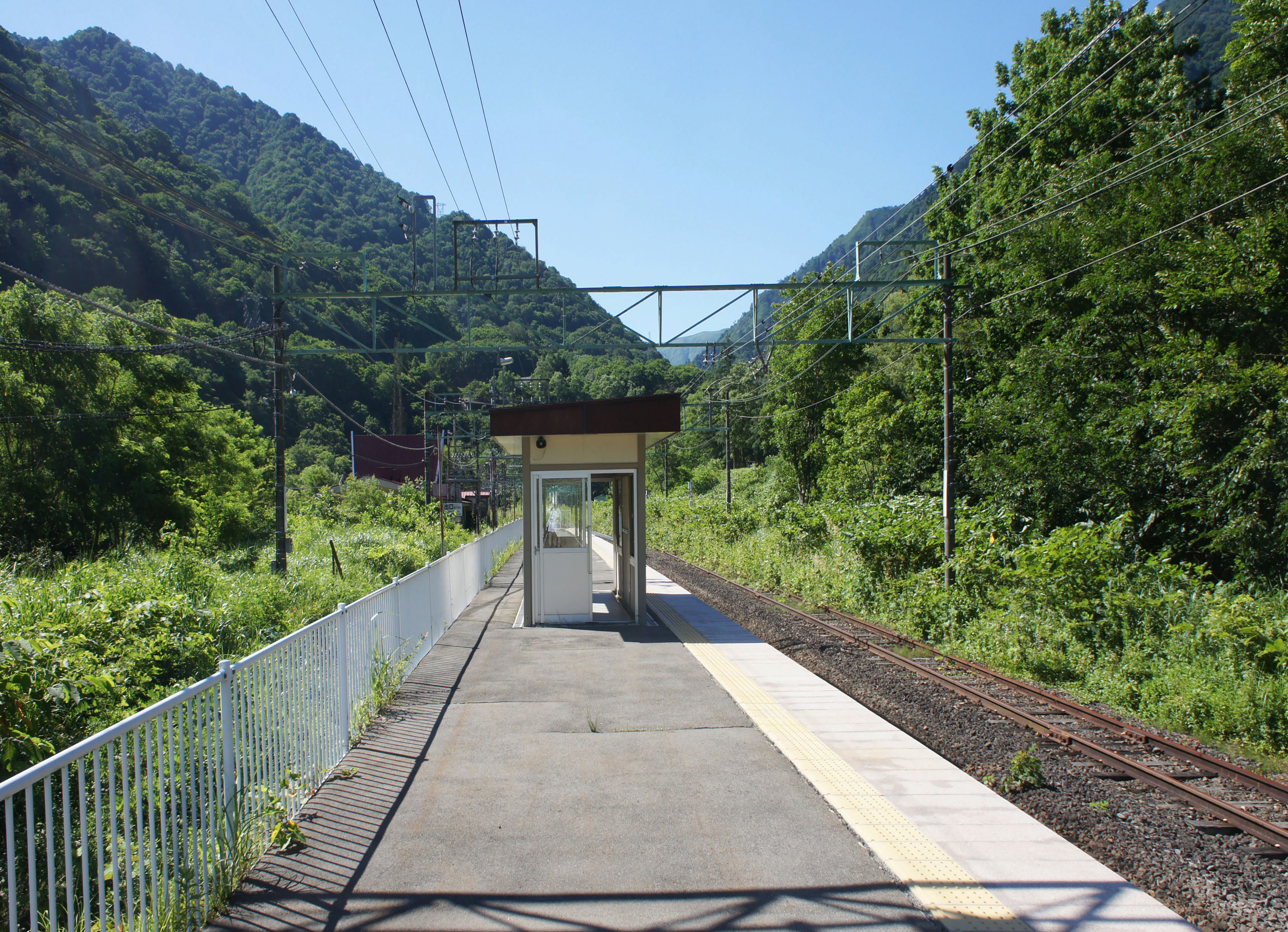
Ground platform, July 2021

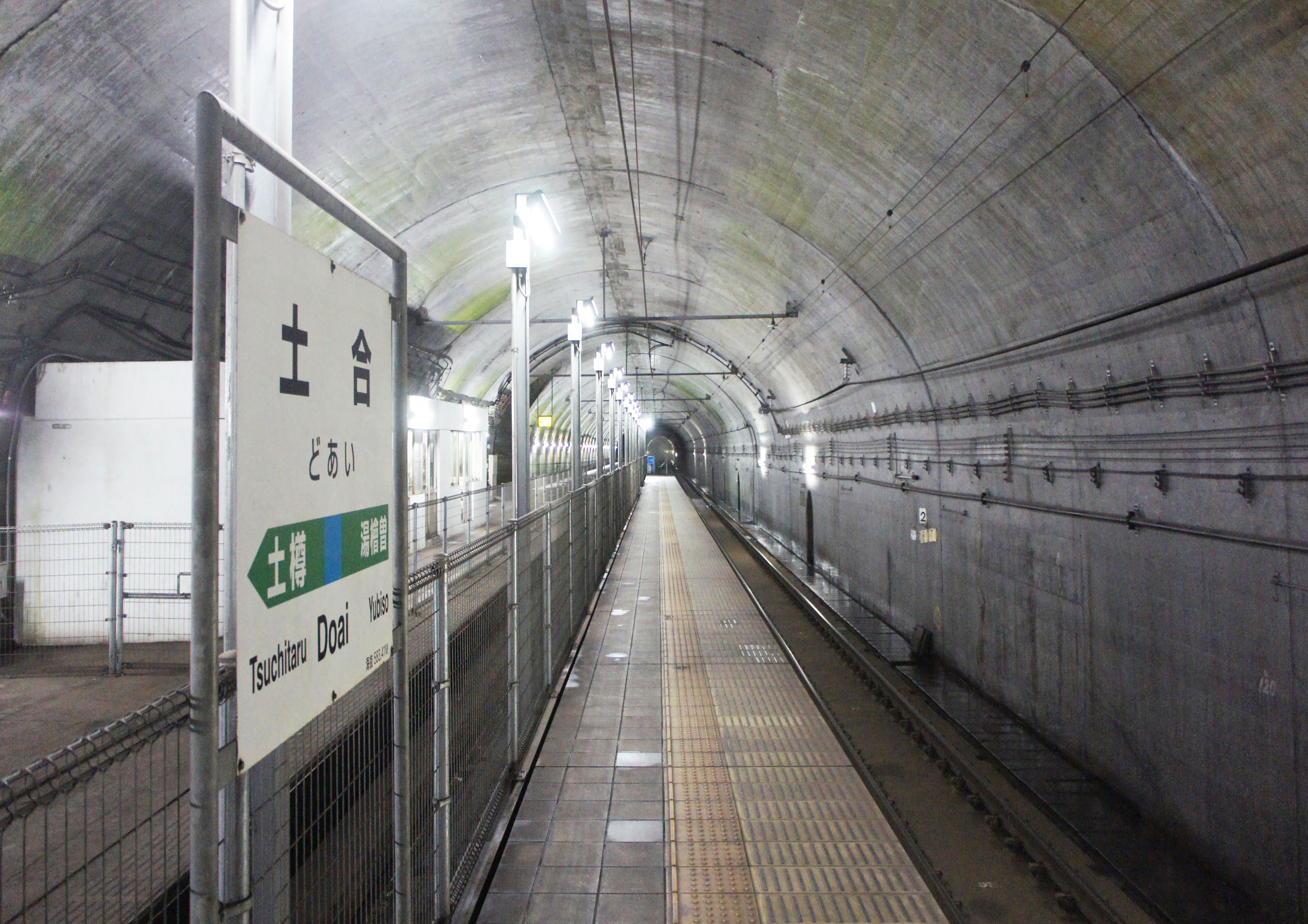
Underground platform, July 2021

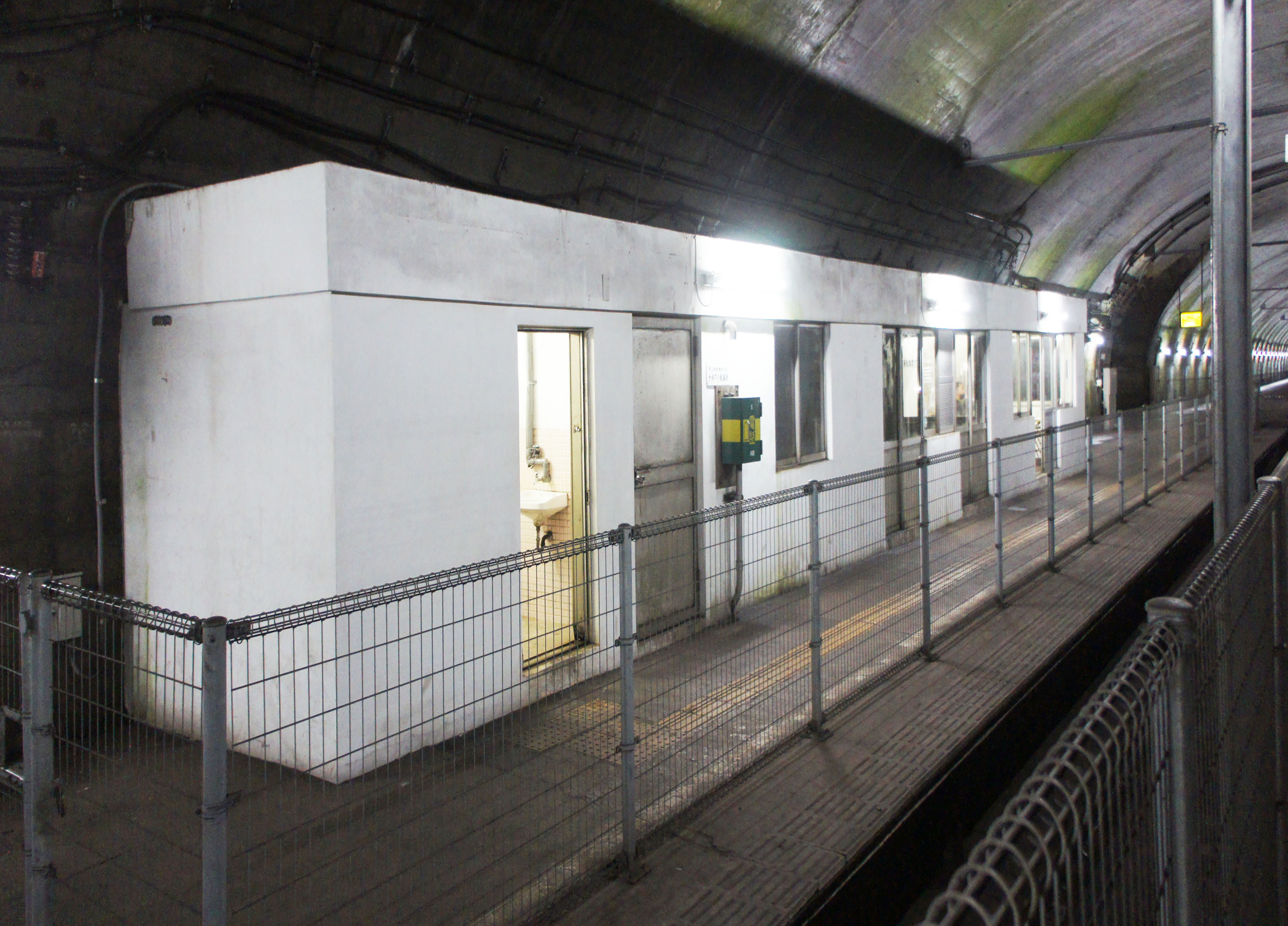
Platform waiting room, July 2021

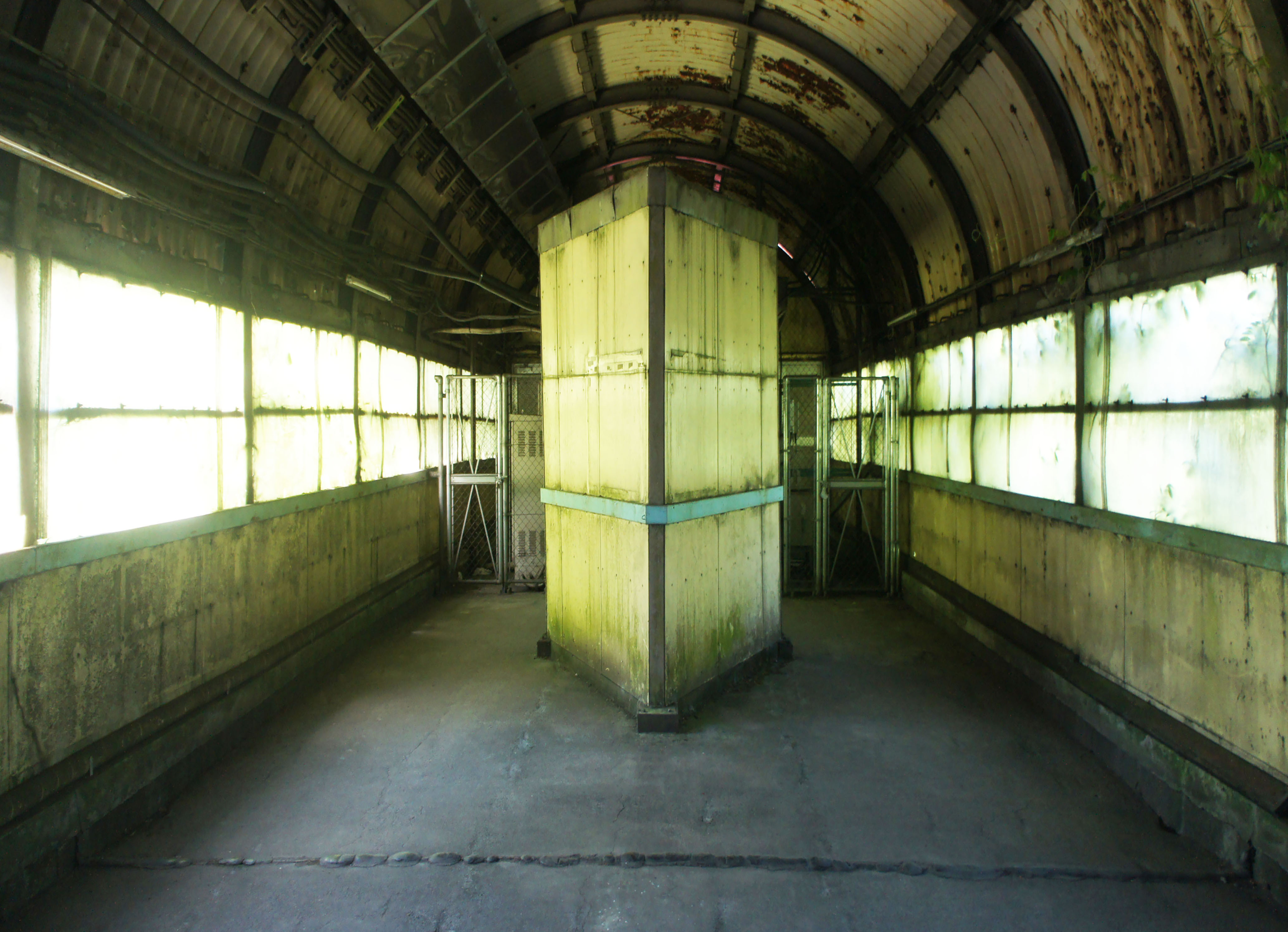
Windbreaking structure in the connecting passageway, July 2021

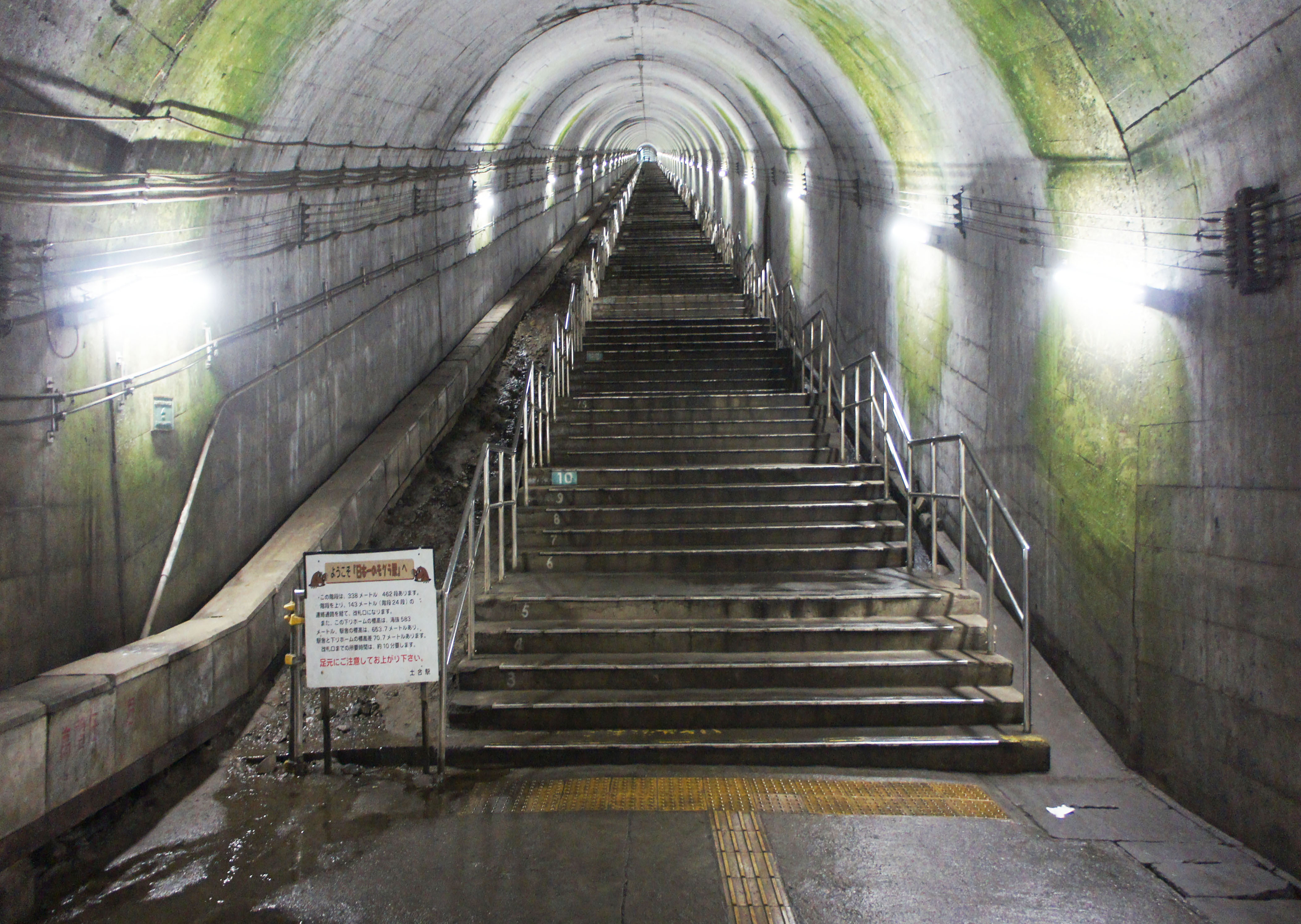
Stairs from the underground platform, July 2021

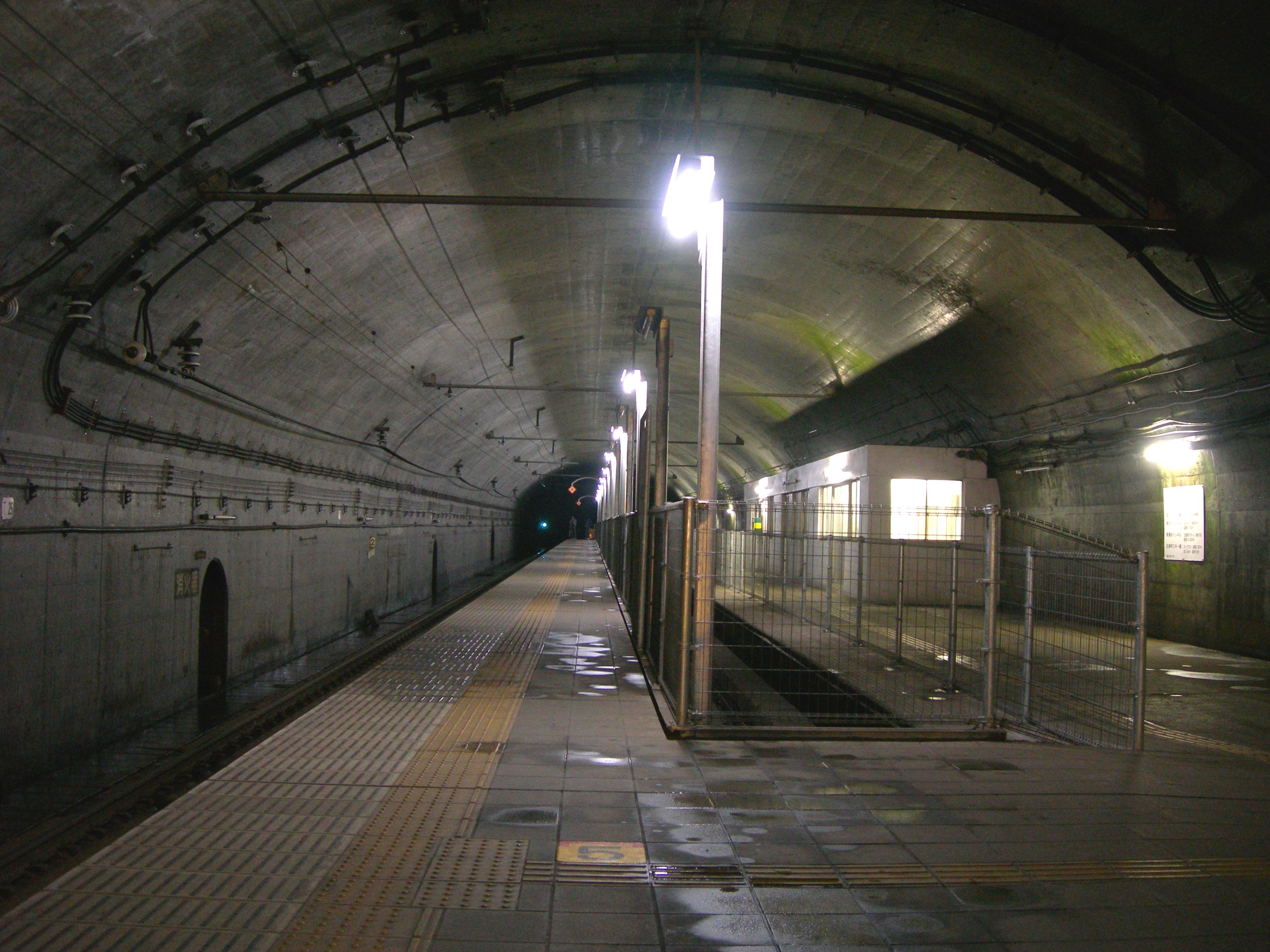
The underground northbound platform

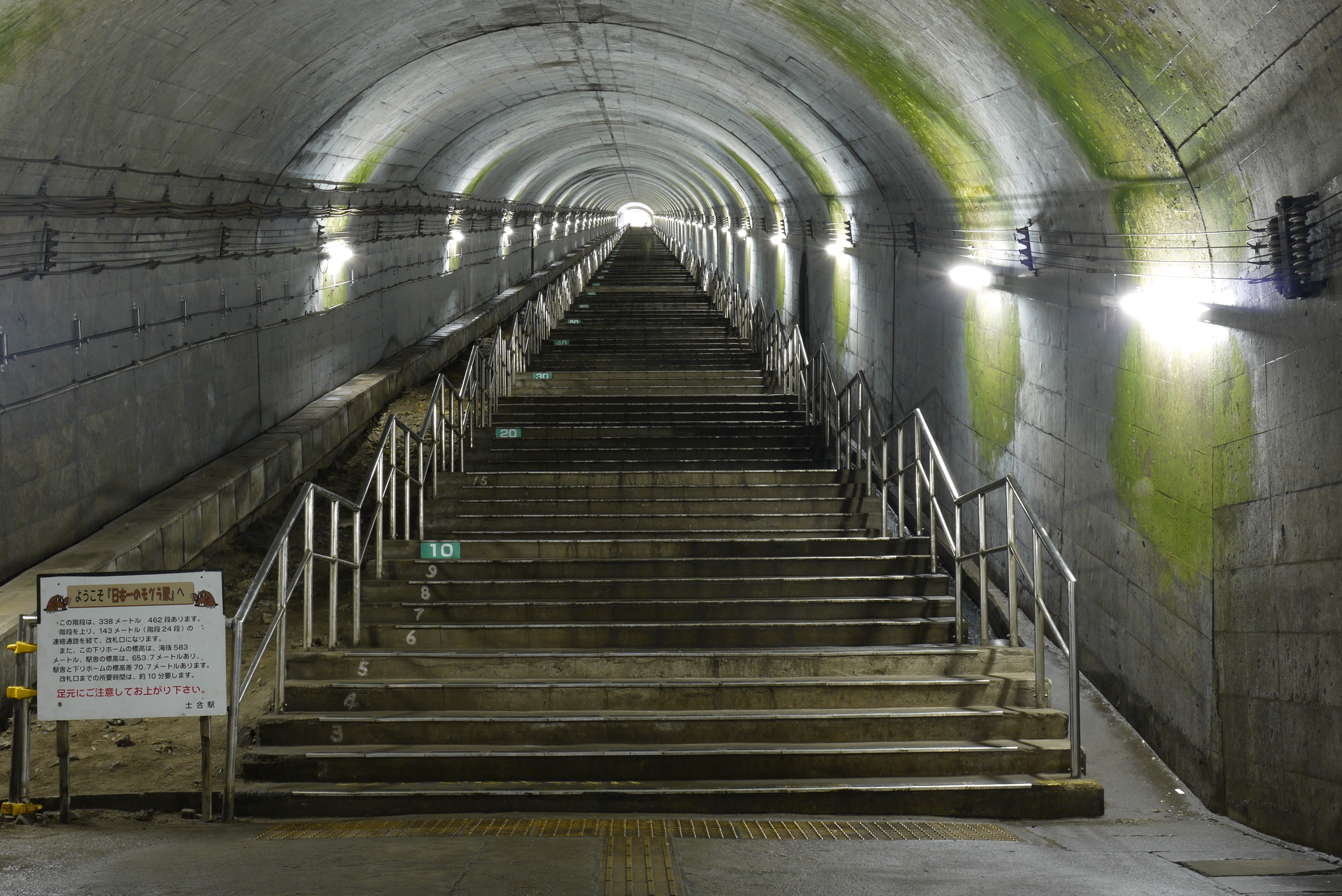
The bottom of the steps at the underground platform

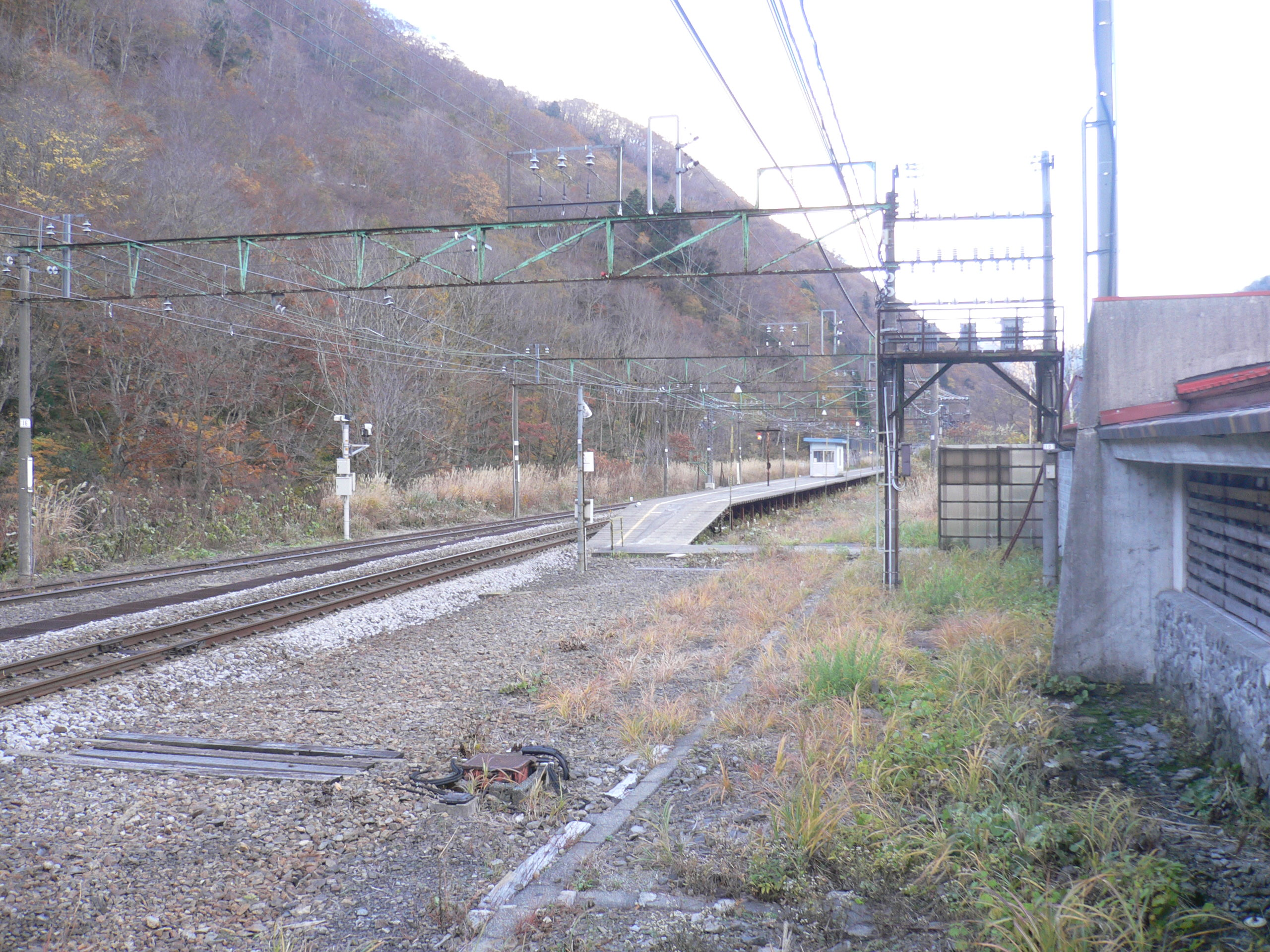
The ground-level southbound platform

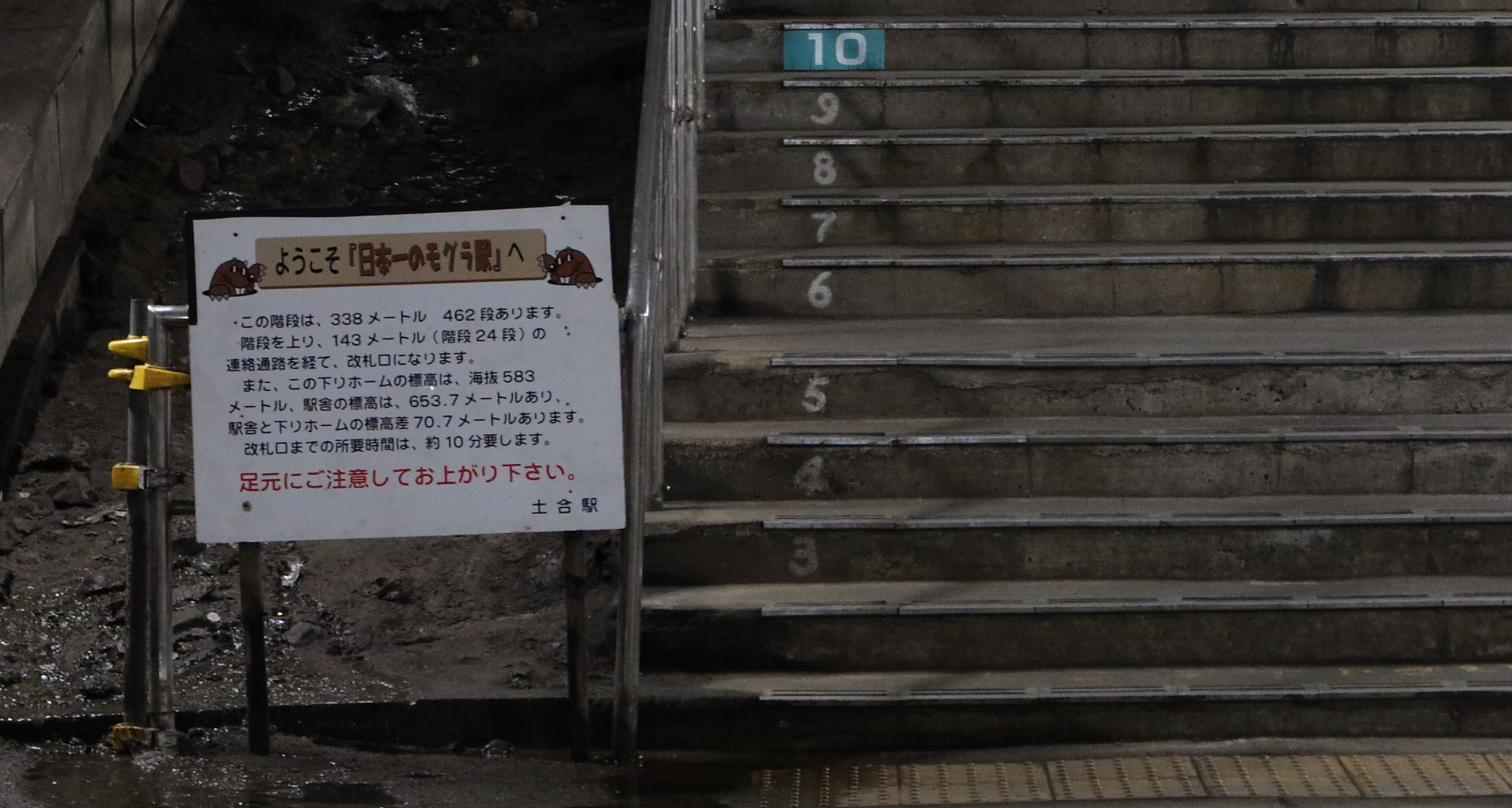
Sign at the bottom of the main staircase

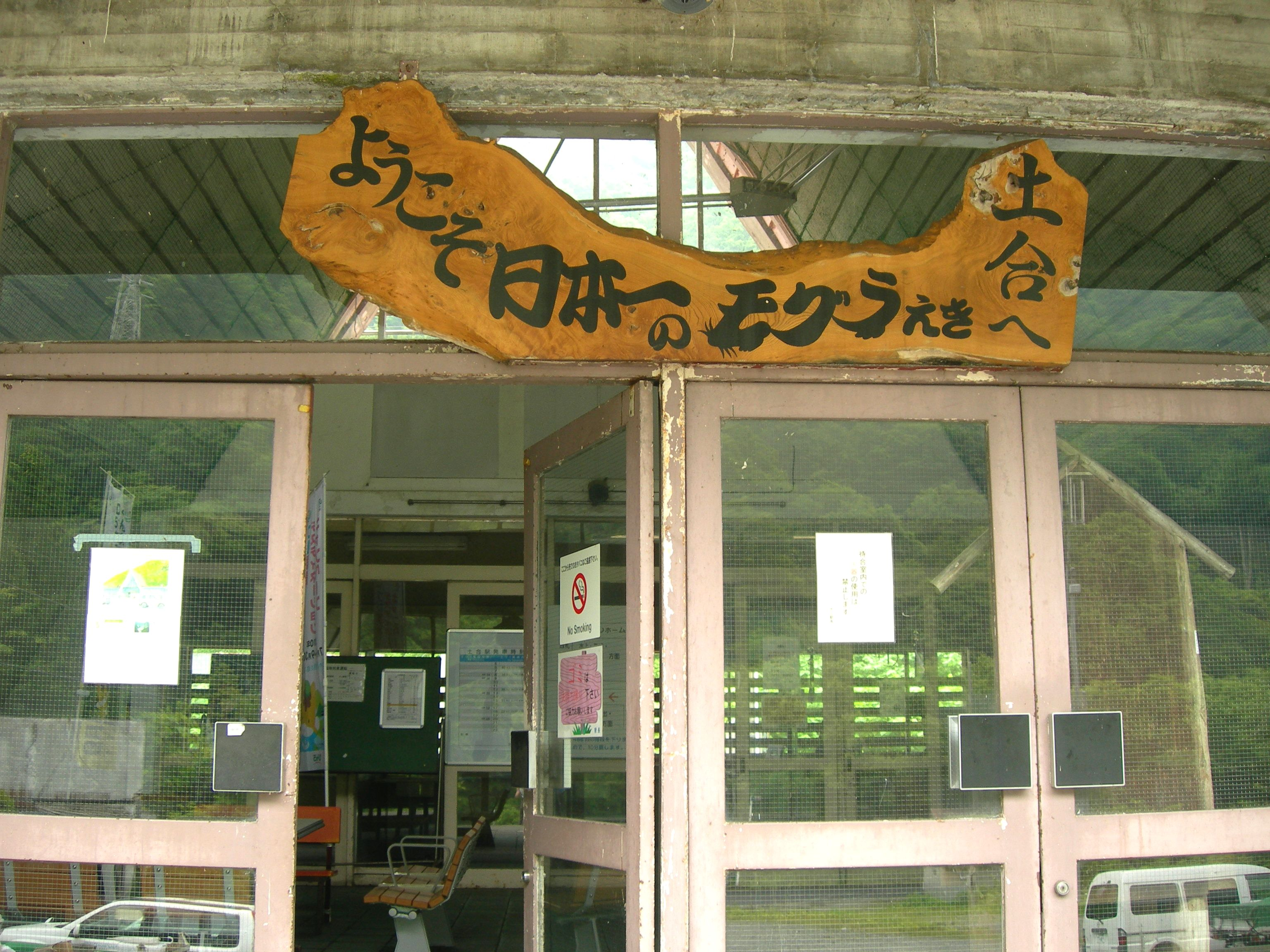
Welcome sign at the station entrance

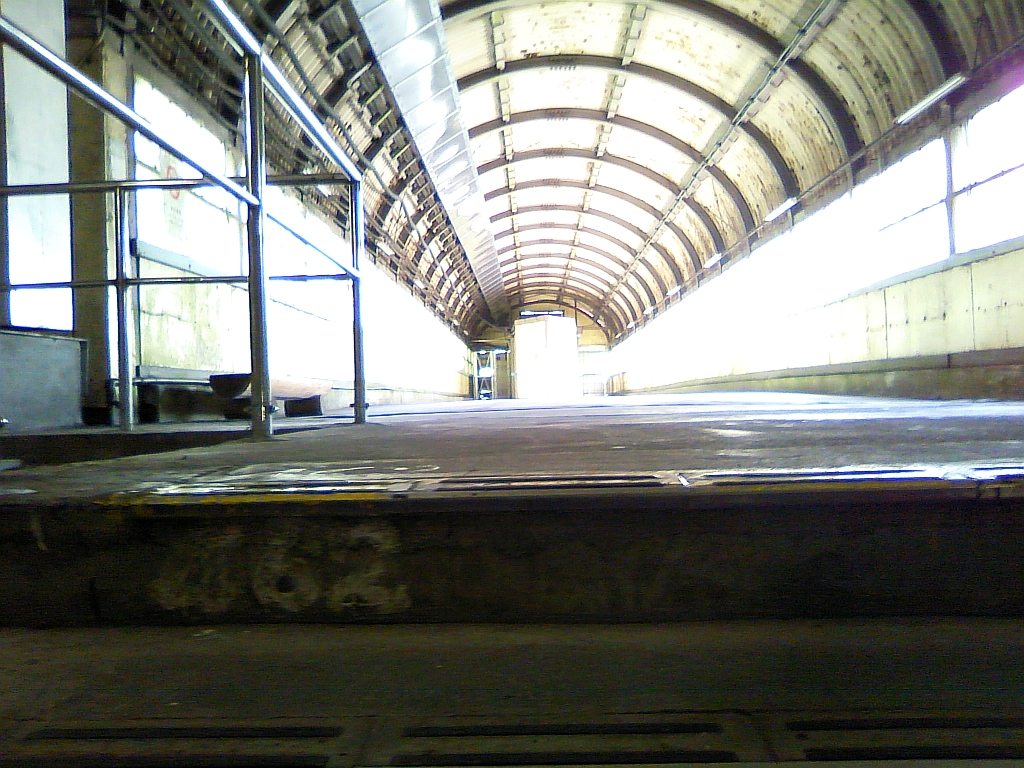
Step 462 at the top of the main staircase

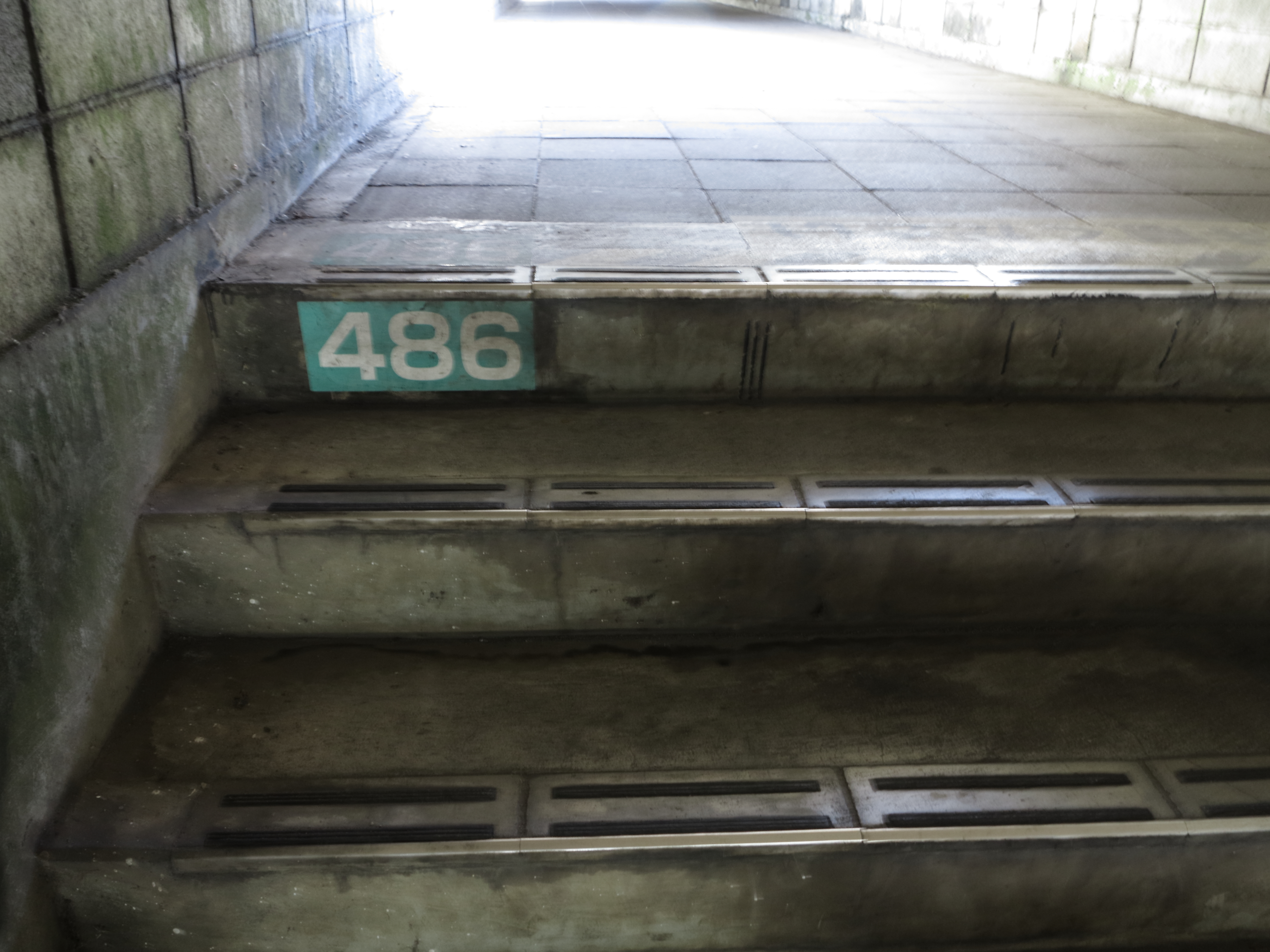
Step number 486, the final step when ascending from the underground platform

== History ==
- The single track Joetsu Line between Minakami and Echigo-Yuzawa opened in 1931, using the 9,702 m (31,831 ft) Shimizu Tunnel which includes two spiral loops.
- Doai Station opened on 19 December 1936.
- The Joetsu Line was converted from single track to double track in 1967, using the 13,500 m (44,300 ft) Shin-Shimizu Tunnel. Advancements in tunneling enabled construction of a more direct route yet deeper tunnel compared to the original tunnel. As a result, passengers catching northbound trains at Yubiso and Doai Stations do so from platforms situated underground within the new Shin-Shimizu Tunnel. In conjunction, the current station building was opened in 1967.
- The Joetsu Shinkansen opened in 1982. Due to the shift of most passengers to the Shinkansen, most express trains on the Joetsu Line ceased operating, and those remaining were gradually removed as Joetsu Line passenger numbers decreased.
- With the privatization of Japanese National Railways (JNR) on 1 April 1987, the station came under the control of JR East.

== In popular media ==
The climb up the steps from the underground platform features at the start of the novel Seventeen (in Japanese, Climber's High) by Hideo Yokoyama, as well as in the NHK dramatization and the movie version Climber's High. It also makes an appearance in the manga and anime series Encouragement of Climb as a destination prior to climbing Mount Tanigawa, west of the site.

Online sources state it is haunted, and as such has become a local ghost hunting spot.

== Surrounding area ==
- Mount Tanigawa (one of the "100 famous mountains in Japan")
- National Route 291

== See also ==
- List of railway stations in Japan
