= List of highways numbered 295 =

The following highways are numbered 295:

== Canada ==
- Quebec Route 295

== Japan ==
- Japan National Route 295

== United States ==
- Interstate 295 (multiple highways)
- U.S. Route 295 (former)
- Alabama State Route 295
- Arkansas Highway 295
  - Arkansas Highway 295 Spur (former)
- District of Columbia Route 295
- Florida State Road 295
  - Florida State Road 295 Spur
- Georgia State Route 295 (unsigned)
- Maryland Route 295
- Massachusetts Route 295
- Minnesota State Highway 295
- Montana Secondary Highway 295
- New York State Route 295
- North Carolina Highway 295
- Ohio State Route 295
- Pennsylvania Route 295 (former)
- South Carolina Highway 295
- Tennessee State Route 295
- Texas State Highway 295 (former)
  - Farm to Market Road 295
- Utah State Route 295 (former)
- Wyoming Highway 295

Preceded by 294	Lists of highways 295	Succeeded by 296
