= List of highways numbered 292 =

The following highways are numbered 292:

== Japan ==
- Japan National Route 292

== United States ==
- Arkansas Highway 292
- Florida State Road 292
- Georgia State Route 292
- Maryland Route 292
- Minnesota State Highway 292
- Nevada State Route 292
- New Mexico State Road 292
- New York State Route 292
- North Carolina Highway 292 (former)
- Ohio State Route 292
- Pennsylvania Route 292
- South Carolina Highway 292
- Tennessee State Route 292
- Texas:
  - Texas State Highway 292 (former)
  - Texas State Highway Loop 292
  - Farm to Market Road 292
- Utah State Route 292
- Virginia State Route 292
- Washington State Route 292

Preceded by 291	Lists of highways 292	Succeeded by 293
