= 289 (disambiguation) =

289 may refer to:

- 289 (number), the natural number
- the year 289 CE
- the year 289 BCE
- telephone area code 289 in the North American Numbering Plan
- 289 Nenetta, an asteroid
- 289 series, a DC electric multiple unit (EMU) train type in Japan
- List of highways numbered 289
