= List of highways numbered 290 =

The following highways are numbered 290:

== Brazil ==
- BR-290

== Canada ==
- Manitoba Provincial Road 290

== Japan ==
- Japan National Route 290

== United States ==
- Interstate 290 (multiple highways)
- U.S. Route 290
- Arkansas Highway 290
- Florida:
  - Florida State Road 290 (former)
  - County Road 290 (Escambia County, Florida)
- Georgia State Route 290 (former)
- Kentucky Route 290
- Maryland Route 290
- Minnesota State Highway 290 (former)
- Montana Secondary Highway 290
- Nevada State Route 290
- New Mexico State Road 290
- New York:
  - New York State Route 290
  - County Route 290 (Erie County, New York)
- Ohio State Route 290 (former)
- Pennsylvania Route 290
- South Carolina Highway 290
- Tennessee State Route 290
- Texas:
  - Texas State Highway 290
  - Texas State Highway Spur 290
  - Farm to Market Road 290 (former)
- Utah State Route 290
- Virginia State Route 290
- Washington State Route 290
- Wyoming Highway 290

Preceded by 289	Lists of highways 290	Succeeded by 291
