= List of highways numbered 291 =

The following highways are numbered 291:

== Canada ==
- Manitoba Provincial Road 291
- Quebec Route 291

== Japan ==
- Japan National Route 291

== United States ==
- Interstate 291 (multiple highways)
- Alabama State Route 291
- Arkansas Highway 291
- Colorado State Highway 291
- Florida State Road 291
- Georgia State Route 291 (former)
- Kentucky Route 291
- Maryland Route 291
- Minnesota State Highway 291
- Missouri Route 291
- Montana Secondary Highway 291 (former)
- Nevada State Route 291 (former designation for Nevada State Route 140)
- New Mexico State Road 291
- New York State Route 291
  - New York State Route 291 (former)
- Ohio State Route 291
- Pennsylvania Route 291
- South Carolina Highway 291
- Tennessee State Route 291
- Texas:
  - Texas State Highway 291 (former)
  - Texas State Highway Loop 291
  - Farm to Market Road 291
- Utah State Route 291
- Washington State Route 291
- Wyoming Highway 291

Preceded by 290	Lists of highways 291	Succeeded by 292
