= Yubiso Station =

Railway station in Minakami, Gunma Prefecture, Japan

Yubiso Station 湯檜曽駅
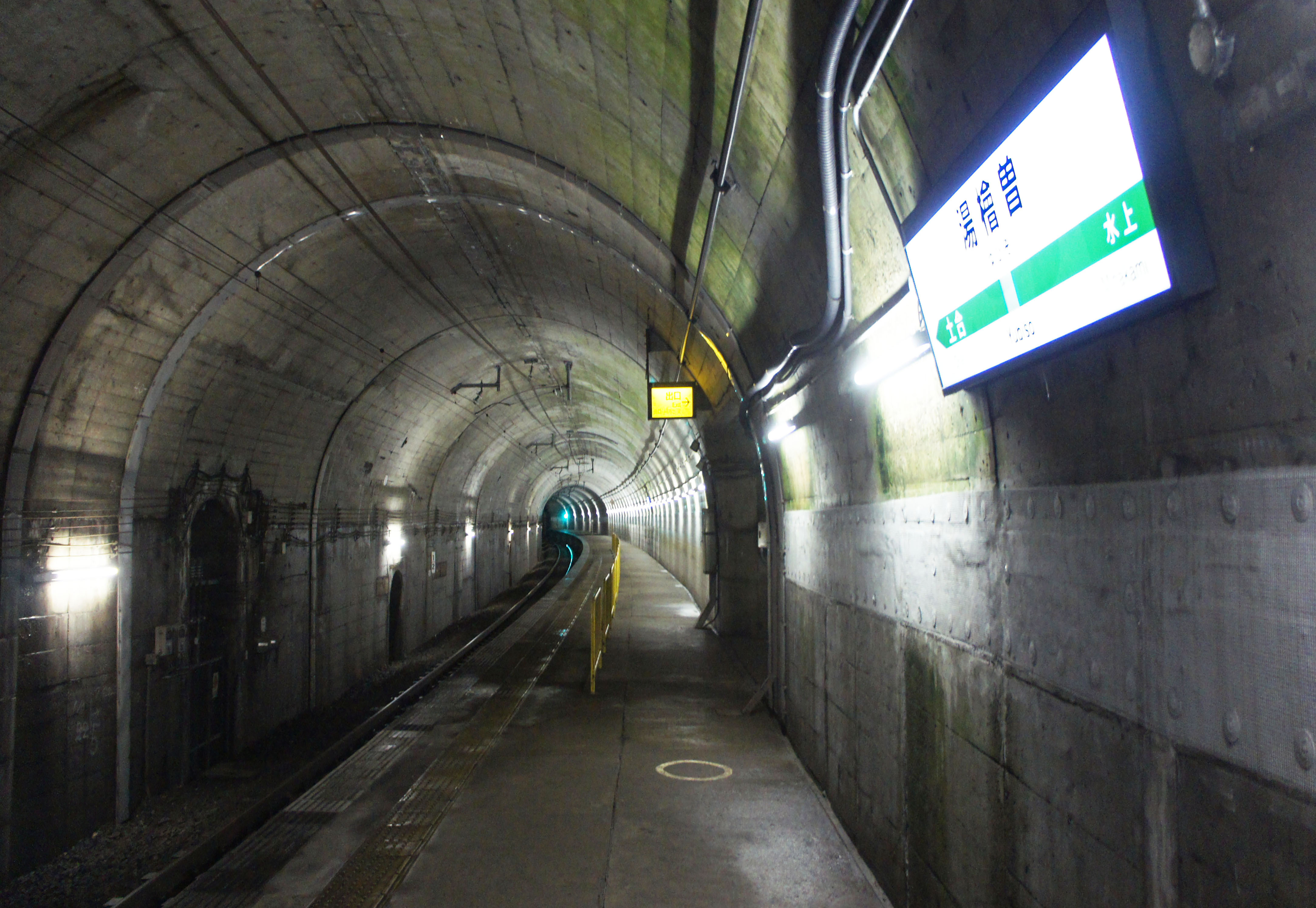
- Yubiso underground platform for Nagaoka-bound trains

General information
- Location: Yubiso 18-2, Minakami Town, Tone District, Gunma Prefecture 379-1728; Japan
- Coordinates: 36.8026°N 138.9860°E
- Operator: JR East
- Line: Jōetsu Line
- Distance: 62.7 km (39.0 mi) from Takasaki
- Platforms: 2 side platforms
- Tracks: 2

Construction
- Structure type: At grade and underground

Other information
- Status: Unstaffed
- Website: Official website

History
- Opened: 1 September 1931; 95 years ago

Passengers
- FY2012: 27 daily

Services
Preceding station	JR East	Following station
Minakami towards Takasaki	Jōetsu Line	Doai towards Nagaoka
Location
- Location within Gunma Prefecture Location within Kanto Area Location within Japan

Yubiso Station, July 2021

Yubiso Station (湯檜曽駅, Yubiso-eki) is a passenger railway station in the town of Minakami, Gunma, Japan, operated by the East Japan Railway Company (JR East).

== Lines ==
Yubiso Station is a station on the Jōetsu Line, and is located 62.7 kilometers from the starting point of the line at Takasaki.

== Station layout ==
The station is unusual in that it has two single side platforms - the southbound platform is at ground level (slightly elevated due to being on an embankment), while the northbound platform is located underground within the Shin-Shimizu Tunnel.

Access to both platforms is by stairs only, there is no ramp, elevator or escalator access. The station is unattended.

== Services ==
As of December 2024, there are 8 services per day in each direction, with gaps of 1-3 hours between services. Southbound services operate to Minakami while northbound services operate to Nagaoka.

=== Platforms ===
underground	■ Jōetsu Line	Northbound for Echigo-Yuzawa and Nagaoka
aboveground	■ Jōetsu Line	Southbound for Minakami

== History ==
Yubiso Station opened on 1 September 1931. Upon the privatization of the Japanese National Railways (JNR) on 1 April 1987, it came under the control of JR East. A new station building was completed in January 2010.

== Surrounding area ==
- Yubiso Post Office
- National Route 291

== See also ==
- List of railway stations in Japan
