= List of highways numbered 288 =

The following highways are numbered 288:

== Japan ==
Japan National Route 288

== Sweden ==
- Länsväg 288 between Uppsala, Gimo and Östhammar

== United States ==
- Arizona State Route 288
- Georgia State Route 288
- Kentucky Route 288
- Maryland Route 288
- Minnesota State Highway 288 (former)
- Montana Secondary Highway 288
- New Mexico State Road 288
- New York State Route 288 (former)
- Ohio State Route 288
- Pennsylvania Route 288
- South Carolina Highway 288
- Tennessee State Route 288
- Texas State Highway 288
  - Texas State Highway Loop 288
  - Farm to Market Road 288 (Texas)
- Utah State Route 288 (former)
- Virginia State Route 288

Preceded by 287	Lists of highways 288	Succeeded by 289
