= List of highways numbered 297 =

The following highways are numbered 297:

== Canada ==
- Quebec Route 297

== Japan ==
- Japan National Route 297

== United States ==
- Interstate 297 (unbuilt)
- Alabama State Route 297
- Arkansas Highway 297
- Florida State Road 297
- Georgia State Route 297
- Iowa Highway 297 (former)
- Kentucky Route 297
- Maryland Route 297
- Minnesota State Highway 297
- Montana Secondary Highway 297
- New York:
  - New York State Route 297
  - County Route 297 (Erie County, New York)
- North Dakota Highway 297
- Ohio State Route 297
  - Ohio State Route 297 (former)
- Pennsylvania Route 297
- Tennessee State Route 297
- Texas State Highway 297 (former)
  - Texas State Highway Spur 297
  - Farm to Market Road 297
  - Urban Road 297 (signed as Farm to Market Road 297)
- Utah State Route 297 (former)

Preceded by 296	Lists of highways 297	Succeeded by 298
