= List of highways numbered 298 =

The following highways are numbered 298:

== Canada ==
- Quebec Route 298

== Japan ==
- Japan National Route 298

== United States ==
- Arkansas Highway 298
- Florida State Road 298
  - Florida State Road 298A (former)
- Georgia State Route 298
- Kentucky Route 298
- Maryland Route 298
- Minnesota State Highway 298
- Montana Secondary Highway 298
- New York State Route 298
  - New York State Route 298 (former)
- Ohio State Route 298 (former)
- South Dakota Highway 298 (former)
- Tennessee State Route 298
- Texas State Highway 298 (former proposed)
  - Texas State Highway Spur 298
  - Farm to Market Road 298
  - Urban Road 298 (signed as Farm to Market Road 298)
- Utah State Route 298
- Virginia State Route 298

Preceded by 297	Lists of highways 298	Succeeded by 299
