= List of highways numbered 293 =

The following highways are numbered 293:

== Brazil ==
- BR-293

== Canada ==
- Quebec Route 293

== Israel ==
- Route 293 (Israel)

== Japan ==
- Japan National Route 293

== United States ==
- Interstate 293
- Alabama State Route 293
- Florida State Road 293
- Georgia State Route 293
  - Georgia State Route 293 Connector
- Kentucky Route 293
- Minnesota State Highway 293 (former)
- Montana Secondary Highway 293 (former)
- Nevada State Route 293
- New Mexico State Road 293
- New York State Route 293
  - New York State Route 293 (former)
- North Carolina Highway 293
- Ohio State Route 293
- Oregon Route 293
- Pennsylvania Route 293 (former)
- Tennessee State Route 293
- Texas:
  - Texas State Highway 293 (former)
  - Texas State Highway Loop 293
  - Farm to Market Road 293
- Utah State Route 293
- Virginia State Route 293

Preceded by 292	Lists of highways 293	Succeeded by 294
