= List of highways numbered 294 =

The following highways are numbered 294:

== India ==
- Andhra Pradesh State Highway 294

== Japan ==
- Japan National Route 294

== United States ==
- Interstate 294
- Arkansas Highway 294
- Florida State Road 294
- Georgia State Route 294 (former)
  - Georgia State Route 294N (former)
  - Georgia State Route 294S (former)
- Iowa Highway 294 (former)
- Kentucky Route 294
- M-294 (Michigan Highway)
- Minnesota State Highway 294 (former)
- Montana Secondary Highway 294
- Nevada State Route 294
- New Mexico State Road 294
- New York:
  - New York State Route 294
  - County Route 294 (Erie County, New York)
- North Carolina Highway 294
- North Dakota Highway 294
- Ohio State Route 294
- Pennsylvania Route 294
- Tennessee State Route 294
- Texas:
  - Texas State Highway 294
  - Texas State Highway Spur 294
  - Farm to Market Road 294
- Utah State Route 294
- Virginia State Route 294
- Washington State Route 294 (former)
- Wyoming Highway 294

Preceded by 293	Lists of highways 294	Succeeded by 295
