= List of highways numbered 296 =

The following highways are numbered 296:

== Canada ==
- Quebec Route 296

== Japan ==
- Japan National Route 296

== United States ==
- Interstate 296 (unsigned)
- Arkansas Highway 296
- Florida State Road 296
- Georgia State Route 296
- Iowa Highway 296 (former unsigned highway)
- K-296 (Kansas highway) (former)
- Kentucky Route 296
- Minnesota State Highway 296 (former)
- Montana Secondary Highway 296
- New York State Route 296
- Ohio State Route 296
  - Ohio State Route 296 (former)
- Pennsylvania Route 296
- South Carolina Highway 296
- South Dakota Highway 296 (former)
- Tennessee State Route 296
- Texas State Highway 296 (former proposed)
  - Texas State Highway Loop 296 (former)
  - Farm to Market Road 296
- Utah State Route 296
- Virginia State Route 296
- Wyoming Highway 296

Preceded by 295	Lists of highways 296	Succeeded by 297
