= Minakami Station =

Railway station in Minakami, Gunma Prefecture, Japan

Minakami Station 水上駅
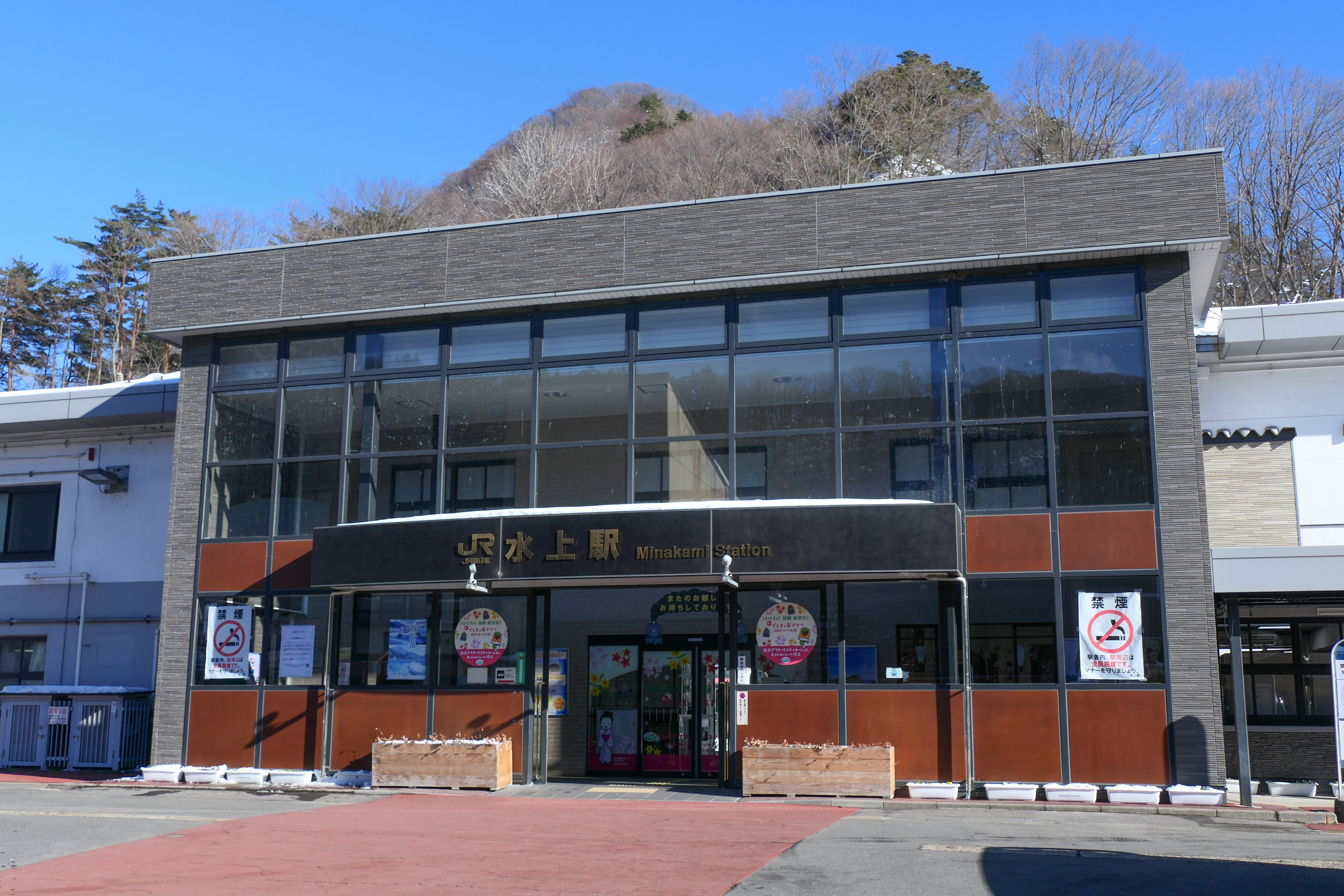
- Minakami Station in January 2021

General information
- Location: 96 Kanosawa, Minakami-machi, Tone-gun, Gunma-ken 379–1611; Japan
- Coordinates: 36.7795°N 138.9690°E
- Operator: JR East
- Line: ■ Jōetsu Line
- Distance: 59.1 km from Takasaki
- Platforms: 1 side + 1 island platforms

Other information
- Status: Staffed
- Website: Official website

History
- Opened: 30 October 1928; 97 years ago

Passengers
- FY2019: 341 daily

Services
Preceding station	JR East	Following station
Kamimoku towards Takasaki	Jōetsu Line	Yubiso towards Nagaoka
Location
- Location within Gunma Prefecture Location within Japan

Minakami Station (水上駅, Minakami-eki) is a passenger railway station in the town of Minakami, Gunma, Japan, operated by the East Japan Railway Company (JR East).

== Lines ==
Minakami Station is served by the Jōetsu Line. Seasonal Minakami limited express and Rapid services operate to and from Ueno Station in Tokyo. It is located 59.1 kilometers from the starting point of the line at Takasaki. Most Local Services terminates here.

== Station layout ==
The station consists of one side platform and one island platform, serving a total of three tracks, connected by a footbridge. The station is staffed.

=== Platforms ===
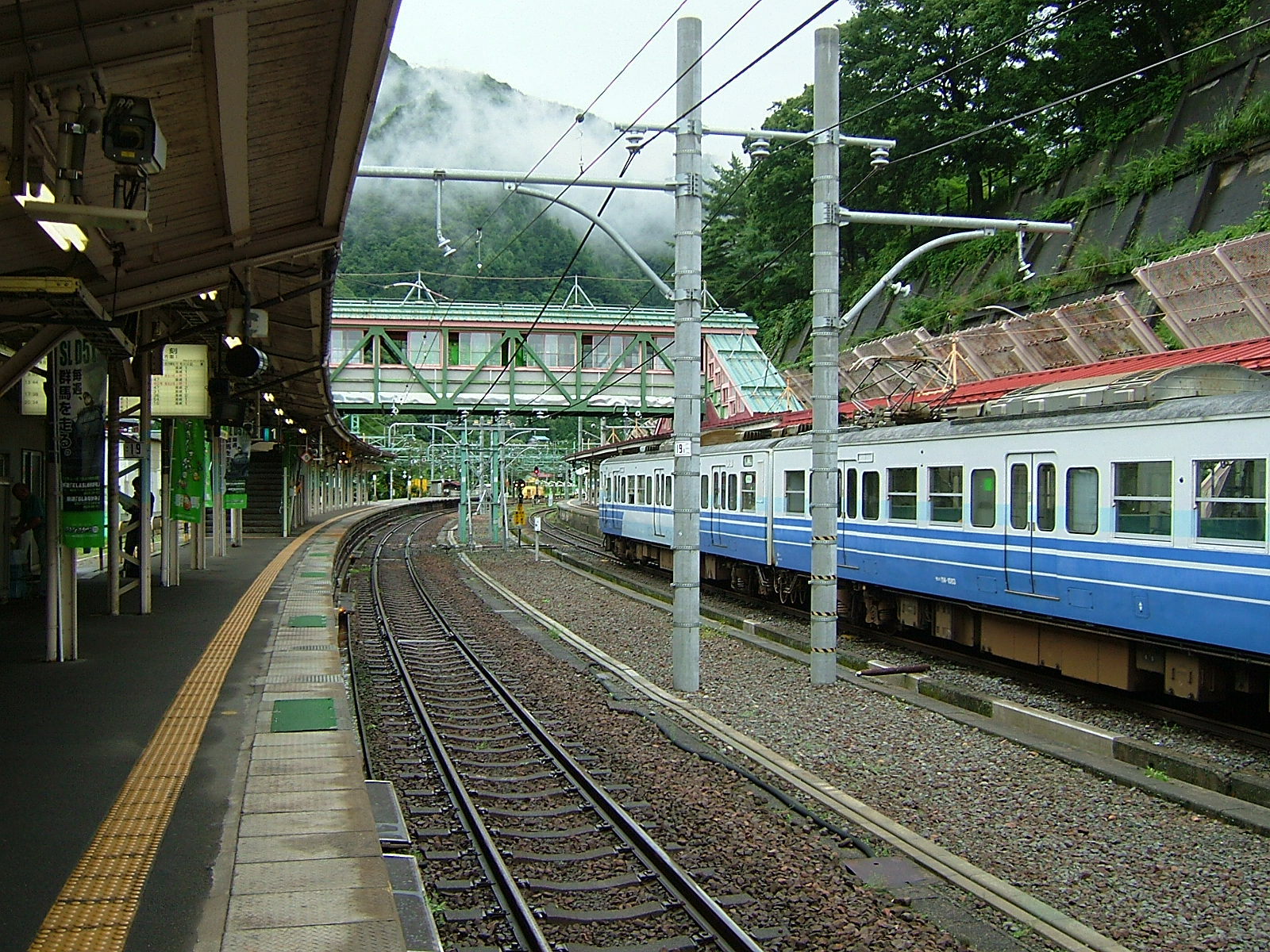
View from platform 1, August 2008

1	■ Jōetsu Line	for Shin-Maebashi and Takasaki
2	■ Jōetsu Line	for Doai and Nagaoka for Shin-Maebashi and Takasaki
3	■ Jōetsu Line	Additional platform

== History ==
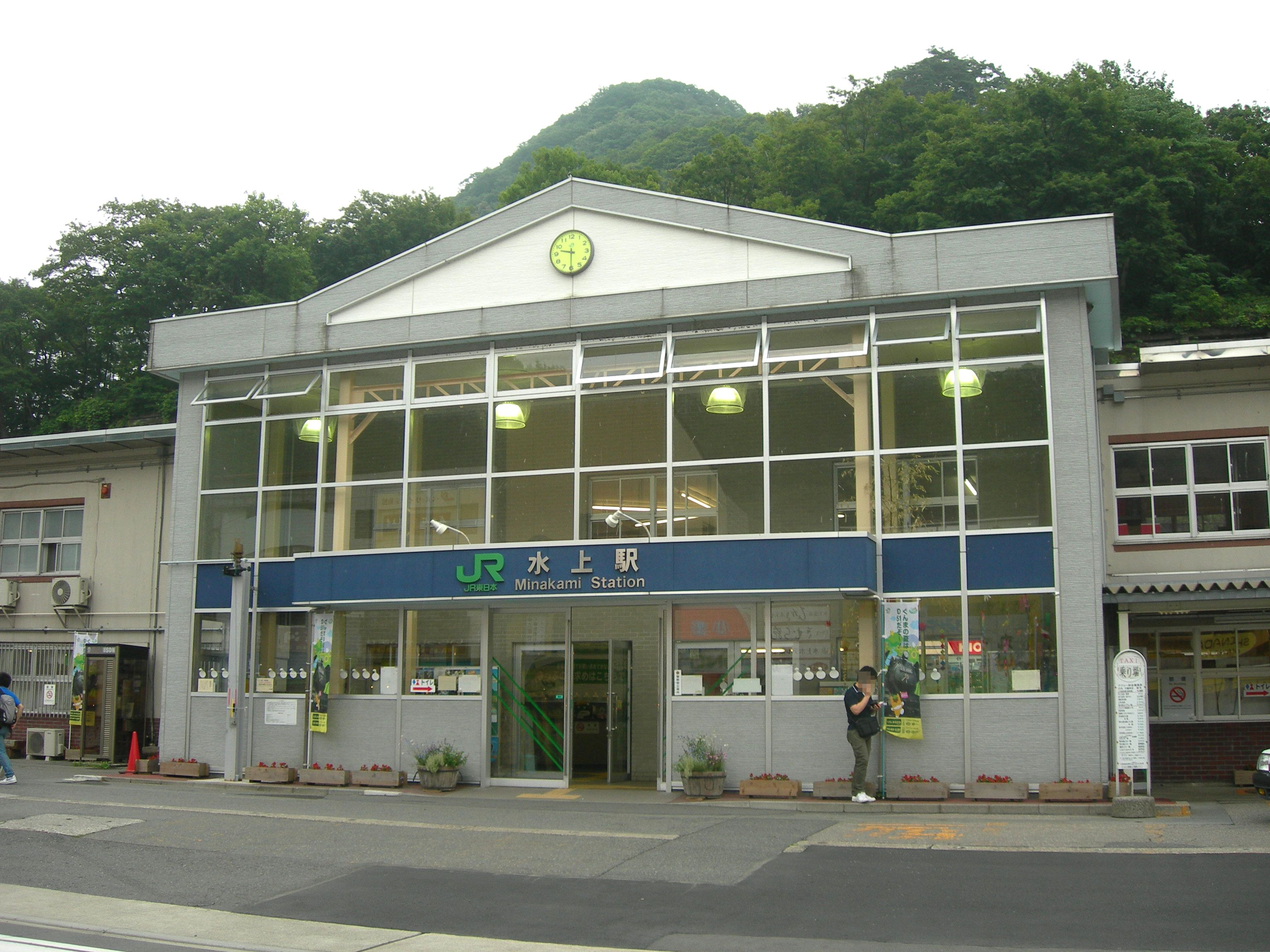
The station entrance in July 2010 before rebuilding

The station opened on 30 October 1928. Upon the privatization of the Japanese National Railways (JNR) on 1 April 1987, it came under the control of JR East.

== Passenger statistics ==
In fiscal 2017, the station was used by an average of 341 passengers daily (boarding passengers only).

== Surrounding area ==
- Minakami Onsen
- Minakami Post Office
- National Route 291

== See also ==
- List of railway stations in Japan
