= Interstate 290 =

Interstate 290 may refer to the following Interstate Highways in the United States:

- Interstate 290 (Illinois), a highway from Chicago, Illinois, to Rolling Meadows, Illinois
- Interstate 290 (Massachusetts), a highway in Massachusetts that connects Auburn to Marlborough via Worcester
- Interstate 290 (New York), a bypass route connecting Interstate 90 to Interstate 190 in Buffalo, New York
- Interstate 290, a cancelled freeway in Cleveland, Ohio, part of which was built anyway as Interstate 490 (Ohio)
