= Japan National Route 292 =

Road in Japan

National Route 292
- 国道292号
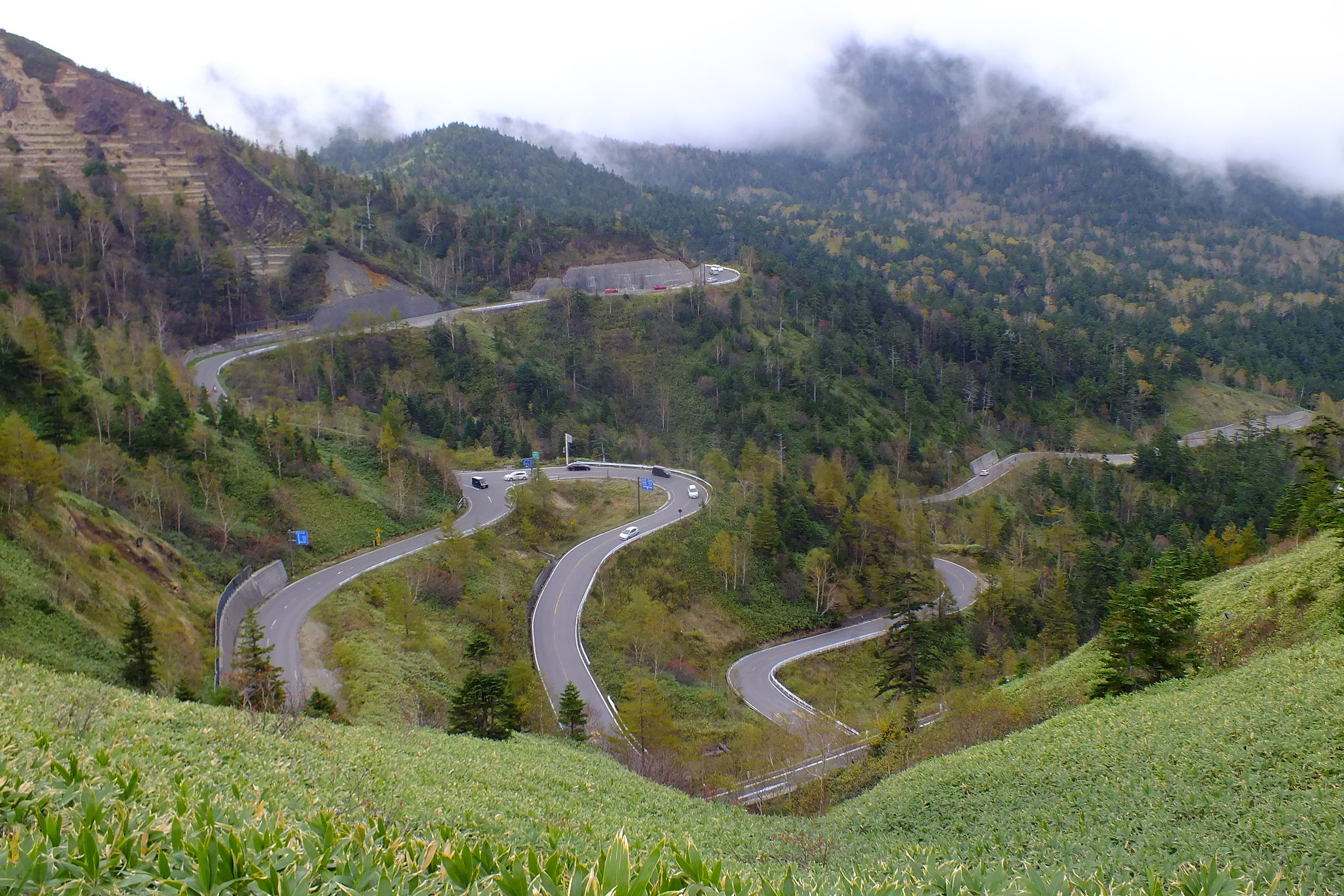

Route information
- Length: 112.6 km (70.0 mi)

Location
- Country: Japan

Highway system
- National highways of Japan; Expressways of Japan
← National Route 291	→ National Route 293

National Route 292 is a national highway of Japan connecting Naganohara, Gunma and Myōkō, Niigata in Japan, with a total length of 112.6 km (70.0 mi).
