= List of highways numbered 289 =

The following highways are numbered 289:

== Canada ==
- Manitoba Provincial Road 289
- Nova Scotia Route 289
- Quebec Route 289

== Japan ==
- Japan National Route 289

== United Kingdom ==
- A289 road (Great Britain)

== United States ==
- Alabama State Route 289
- Arizona State Route 289
- Connecticut Route 289
- Florida State Road 289
- Georgia State Route 289 (former)
- Kentucky Route 289
- Maryland Route 289
- Minnesota State Highway 289
- Montana Secondary Highway 289 (former)
- Nevada State Route 289
- New Mexico State Road 289
- New York State Route 289
- Ohio State Route 289
- Texas State Highway 289
  - Texas State Highway Loop 289
  - Farm to Market Road 289 (Texas)
- Utah State Route 289
- Vermont Route 289
- Virginia State Route 289

Preceded by 288	Lists of highways 289	Succeeded by 290
