= Mount Tanigawa =

Mountain in Gunma and Niigata Prefectures, Japan

Tanigawa-dake
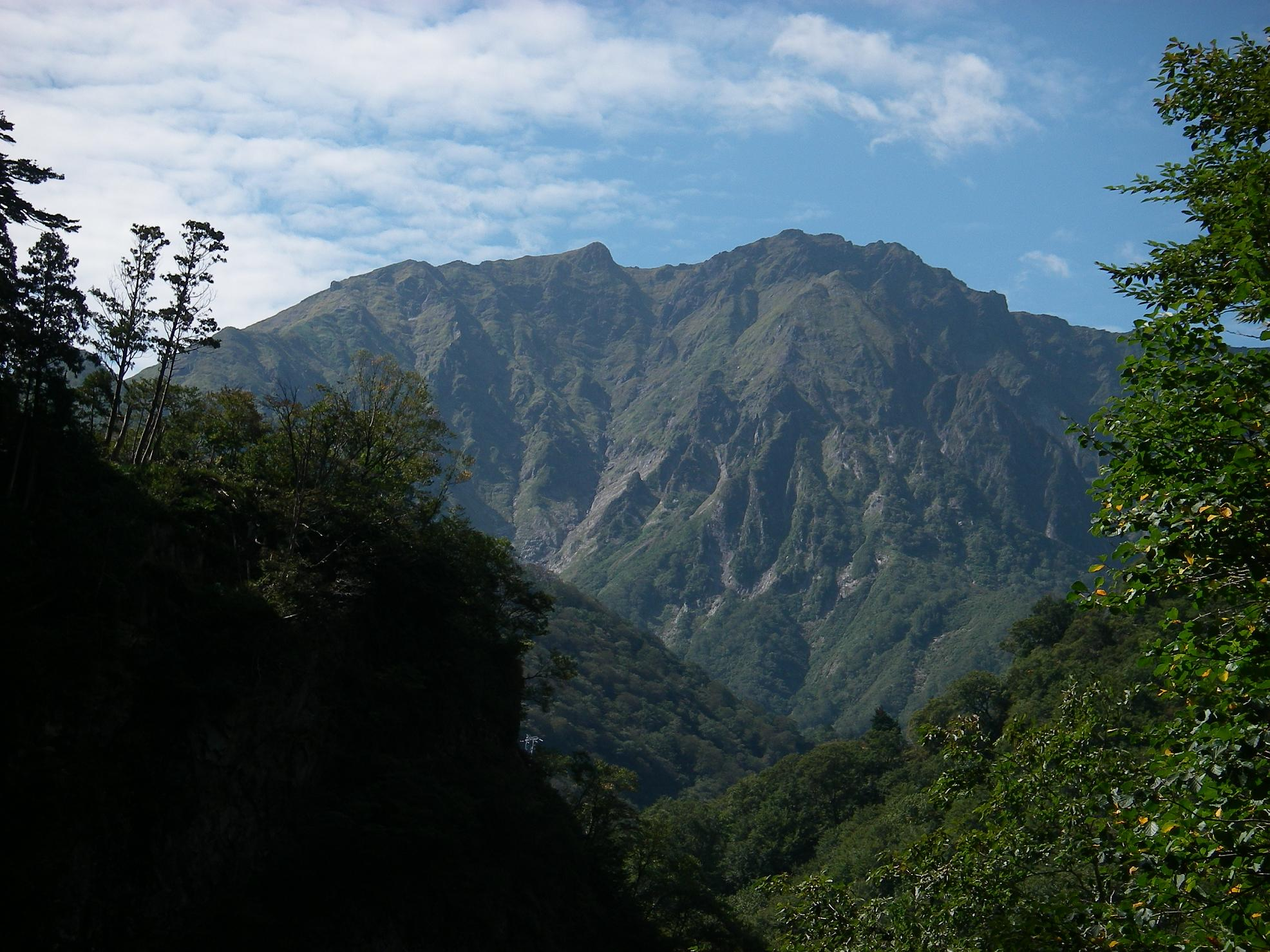
- Mount Tanigawa from the east

Highest point
- Elevation: 1,977 m (6,486 ft)
- Coordinates: 36°50′14″N 138°55′47″E

Geography
- Location within Gunma Prefecture
- Location: Minakami, Gunma, Honshū, Japan
- Parent range: Mikuni Mountains

Mount Tanigawa (谷川岳, Tanigawa-dake) is a 1,977 m (6,486 ft) mountain on the border of Gunma Prefecture and Niigata Prefecture in Japan. It is one of the 100 famous mountains in Japan.

== Routes ==
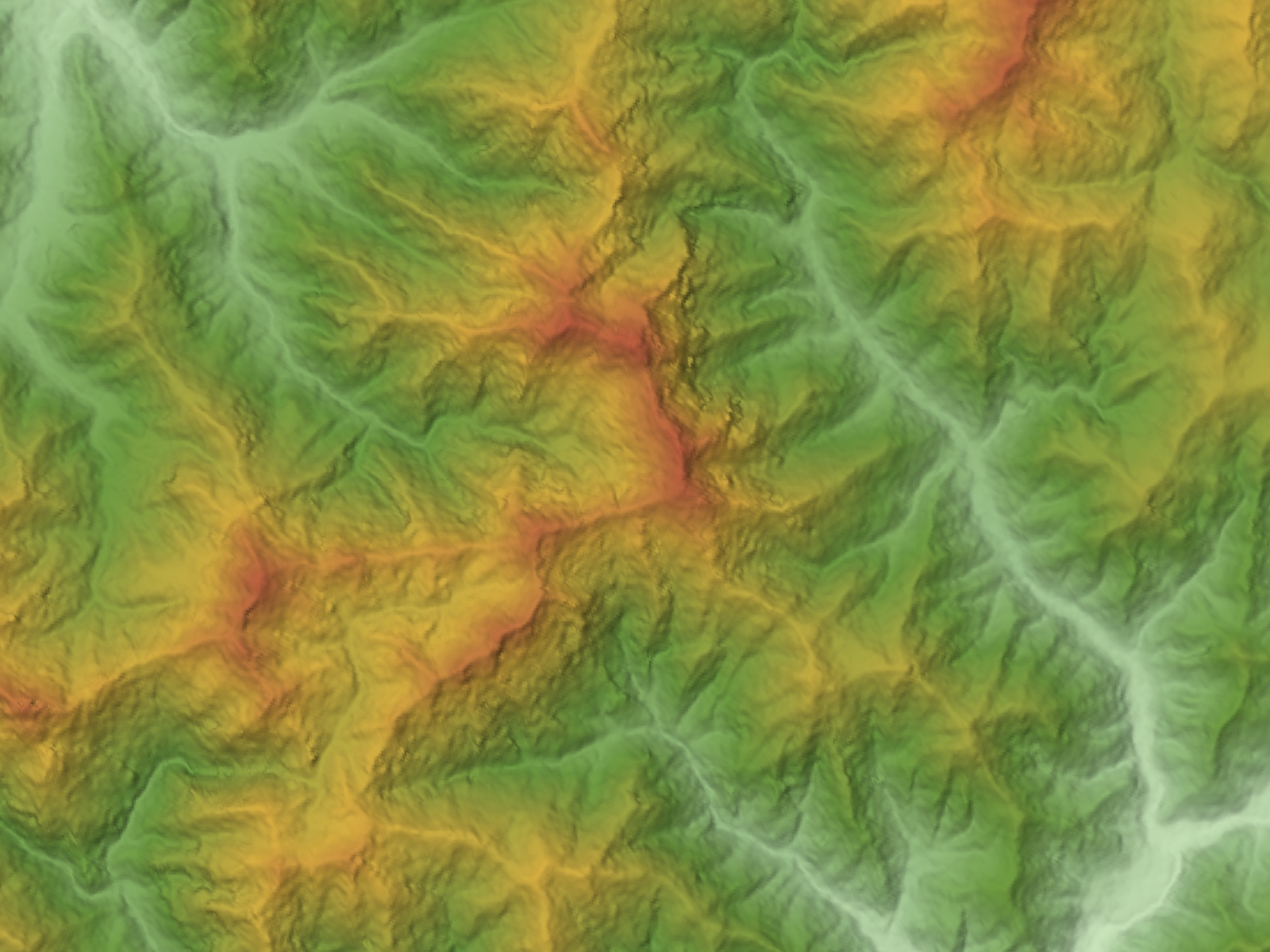
Relief map of Mount Tanigawa

The mountain trail leading to the summit of Mount Tanigawa from four directions: north, south, east and west. The easiest and most popular is the southern route via the cable car, and many families reach the summit on holidays.

Rock climbing routes are graded according to the Japanese Ice Climbing Rating from I-VI and there are numerous routes along the Eastern Ridges, with significant rock routes for summer climbing. Although the mountain is 1,800 metres (5,906 ft) less than Mt. Fuji (in fact barely half its height), the relief is stark, with some routes starting as low as at 500 metres (1,640 ft) above sea level and topping out at or near the summit.

Like many mountains in Japan, there is no officially recorded first ascent. Many mountains have a religious significance and have been hiked and summited by Japanese religious ascetics for hundreds of years.

== Weather ==
The mountain lies on the border of Gunma and Niigata Prefectures and sits precisely where the weather systems from the Asian continent and the Pacific meet in often furious displays of extreme weather. Cornices on the ridge can reach out over 20 metres and occur at lower levels of the mountain as well as along the summit ridge. When avalanche risk is high, the consequences can be particularly dangerous given the steep terrain and over 1000m of relief to gather force.

== Safety ==
Although many trekking routes leading to the summit are relatively safe, there have been many deaths due to rock climbing, so it is sometimes called "mountain of death". As of December 2014, since its initial exploration and route-finding in the early 1930s, a total of 805 people have died on Tanigawa-dake. (Compare with the approximately 200 people who have died on Mt. Everest over a comparable period.) In 1943, a climbing party disappeared on the mountain. They were not found until another climbing party stumbled upon their remains in 1973. In the 1960s, there was a famous rescue attempt of Japanese climbers on the main face who had died of exposure. Their bodies were eventually brought down when the Japanese Self-Defense Forces cut the rope with gunfire in order to retrieve the bodies.

Japan offers a high level of support with helicopter trained mountain rescue teams, though with high wind there is always the chance that they cannot be deployed. Along the upper ridges are two safety huts. One is the emergency hut for 2-3 climbers near Ichinokura-dake (一ノ倉岳), which may be hard to find in deep snow and therefore unusable. The much larger "Shoulder Hut" below the summit of Tanigawa-Dake is much more spacious, but is unheated and unstaffed in winter.

Sometimes called the mountain of death, the mountain is bedecked at all levels with commemorative plaques for those who have died on the mountain. Some of these groups have been rather large. Near the base of the mountain is a large sculpted piton, with an adjoining wall inscribed with the names of all those who have died on the mountain.

== Miscellaneous ==
The closest train station is Doai Station (土合駅).

Climbing Mount Tanigawa is one of the main storylines in the novel Seventeen (Climber's High in Japanese), which was made into an NHK documentary in 2005 and a movie (Climber's High) in 2008.

The mountain serves as a central plot point in the series Encouragement of Climb, where friends Aoi and Hinata first experience the thrill of mountain climbing together in their youth.

Japanese clothing and lifestyle retailer Snow Peak is named after Mount Tanigawa.

In Gunma's Jomo Karuta, Mount Tanigawa is featured on the 'mi' card.

== Gallery ==
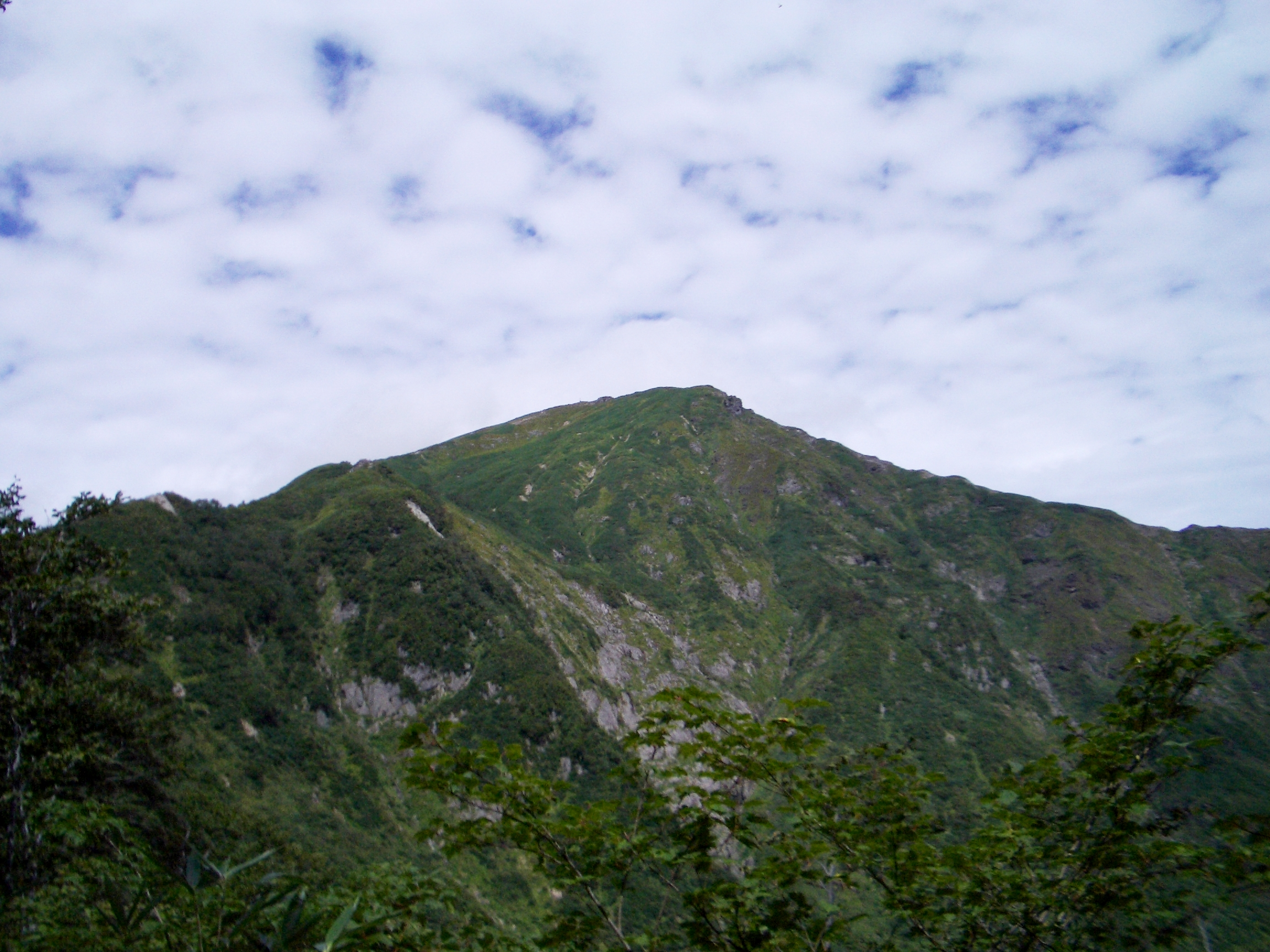
Mount Tanigawa from the south

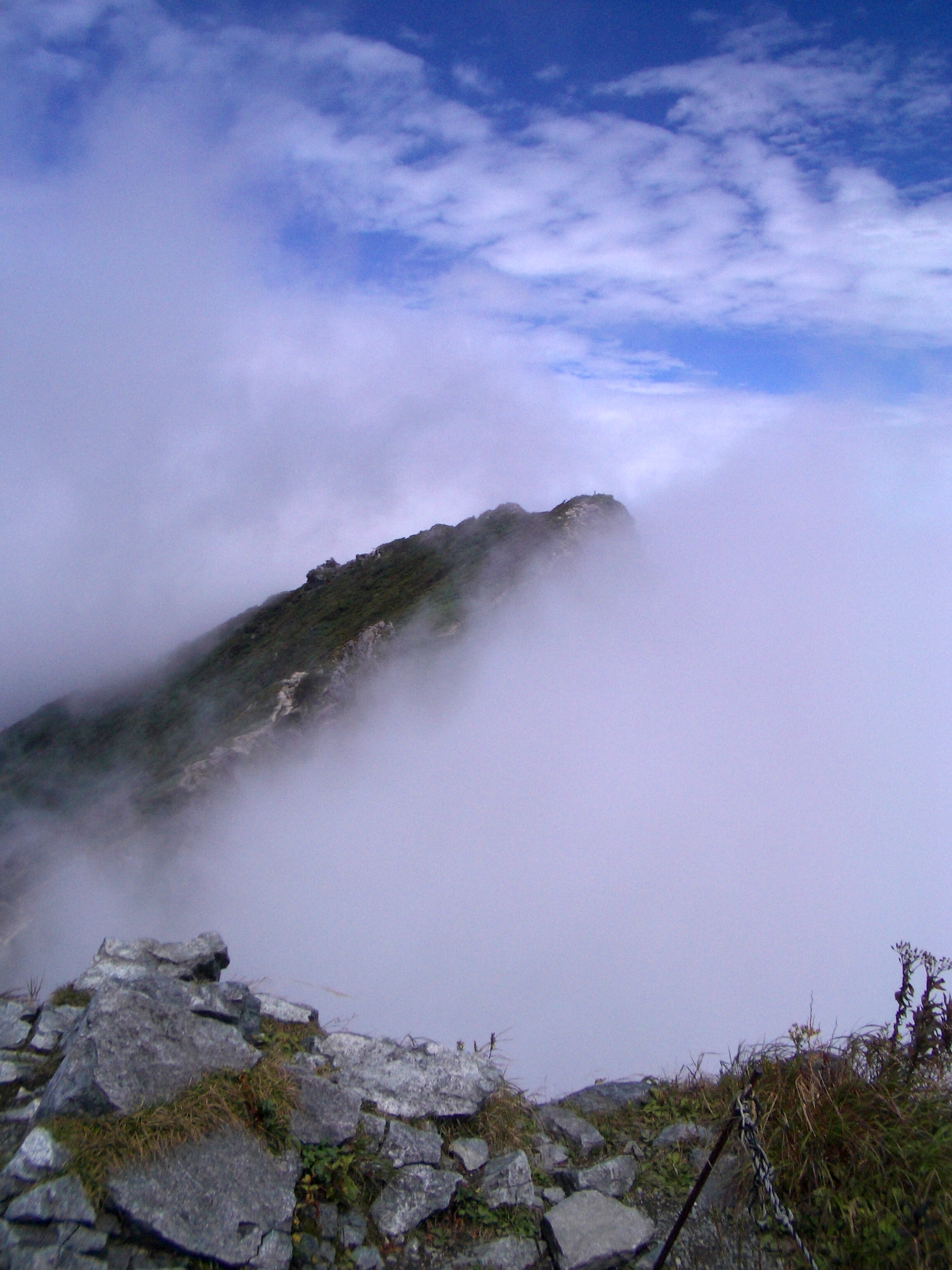
The top of Mount Tanigawa amid clouds

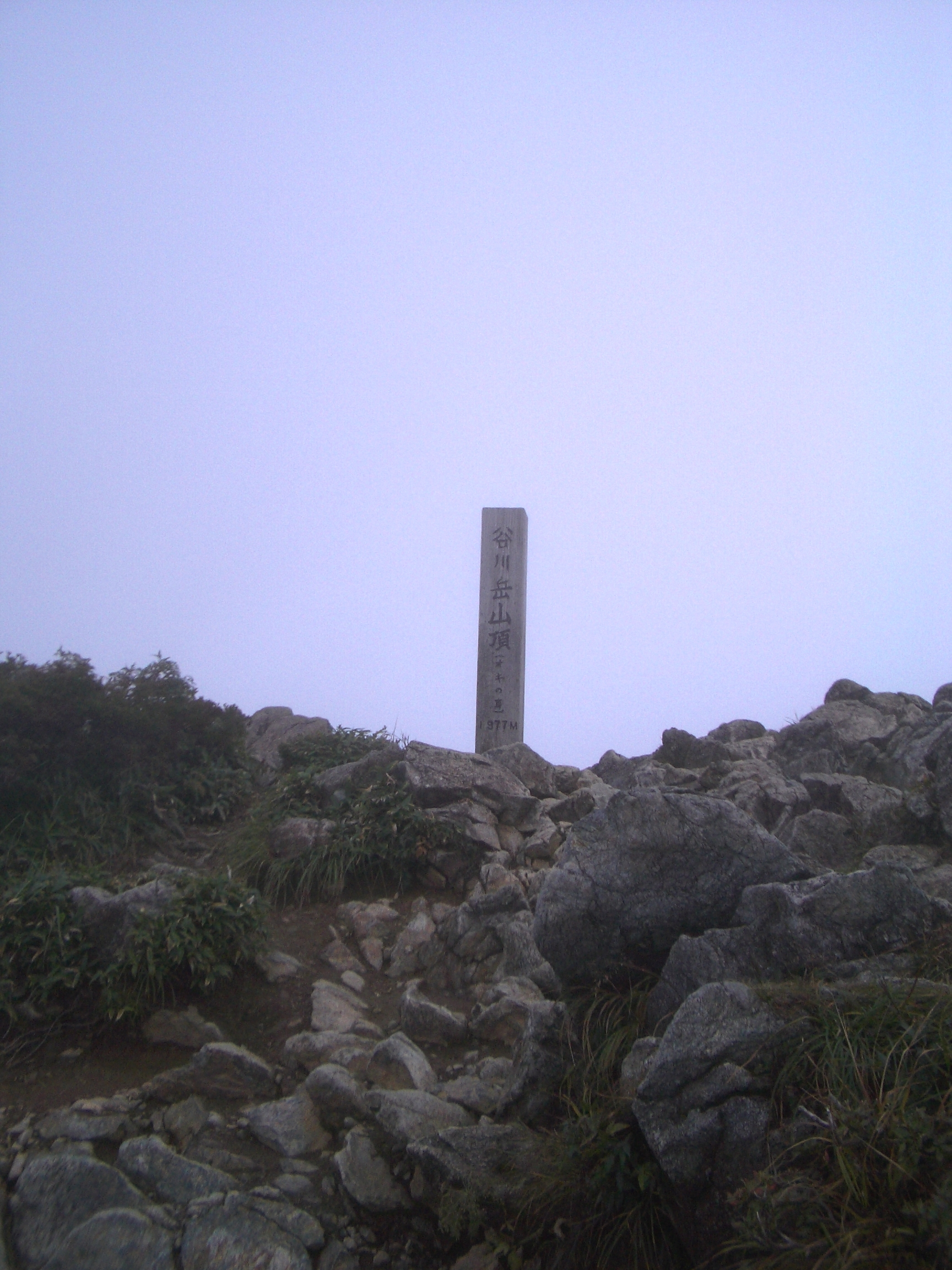
The top of Mount Tanigawa

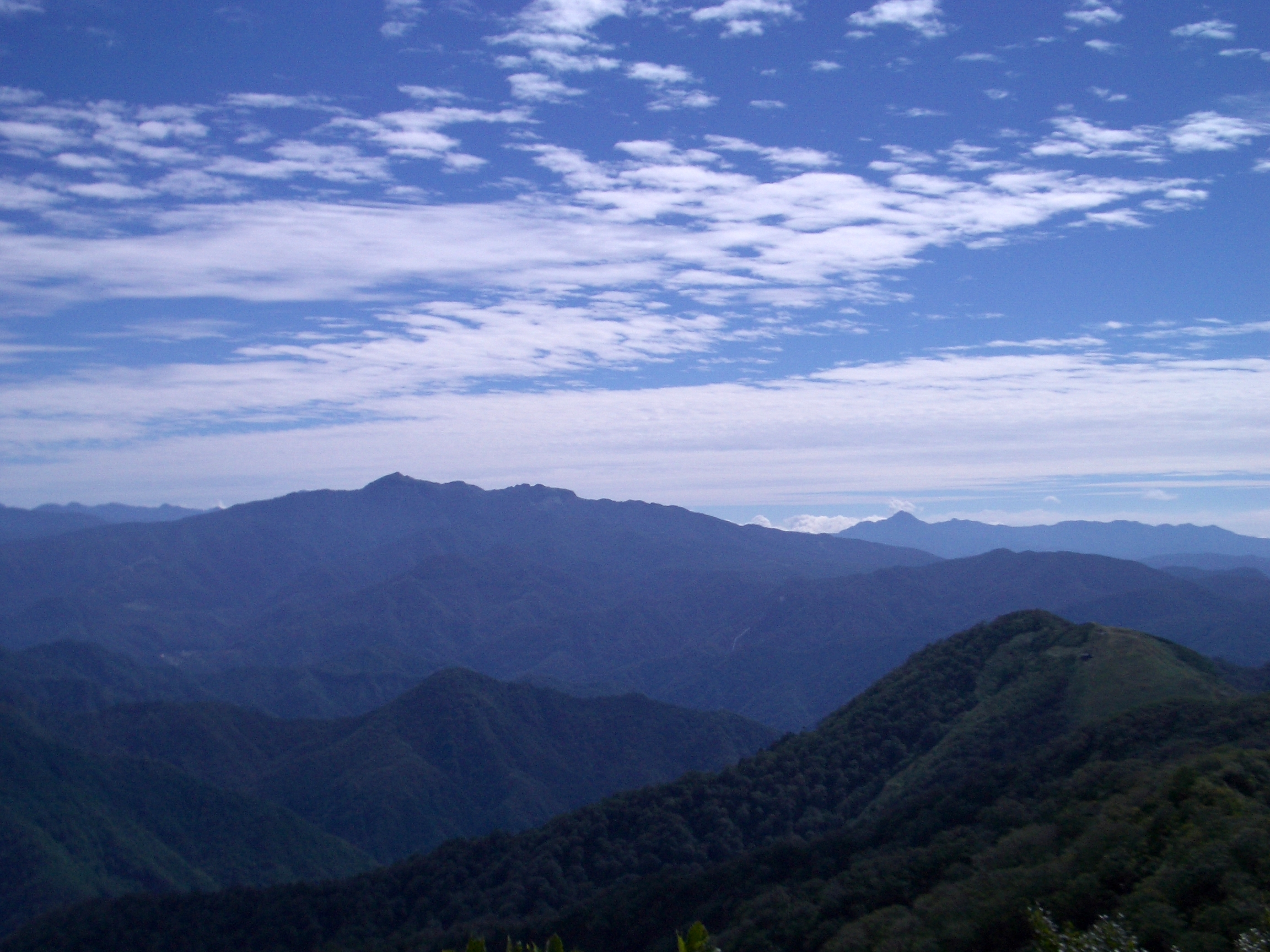
Mount Hotaka and Akagi Mountains from Mount Tanigawa

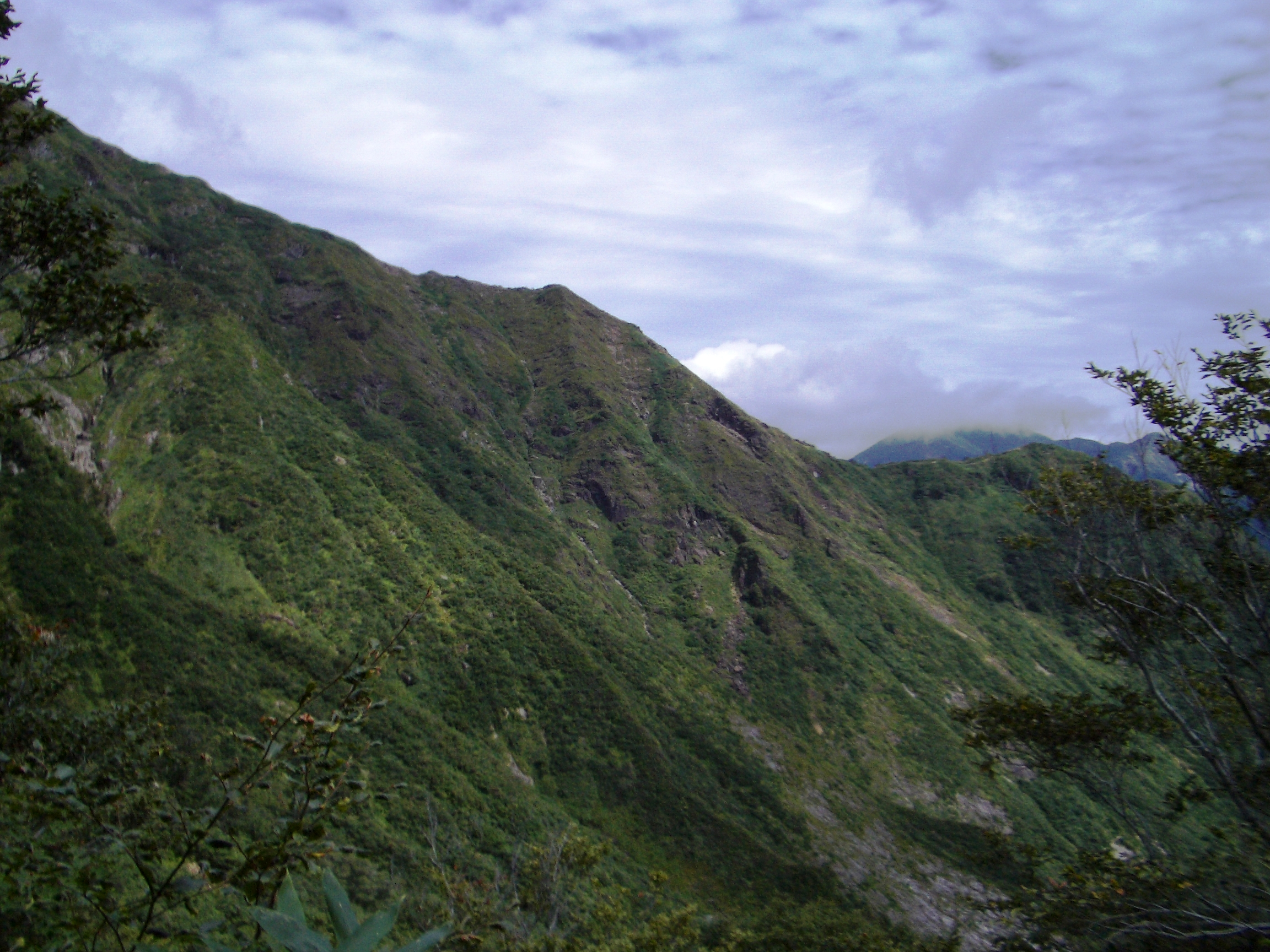
South wall of Mount Tanigawa

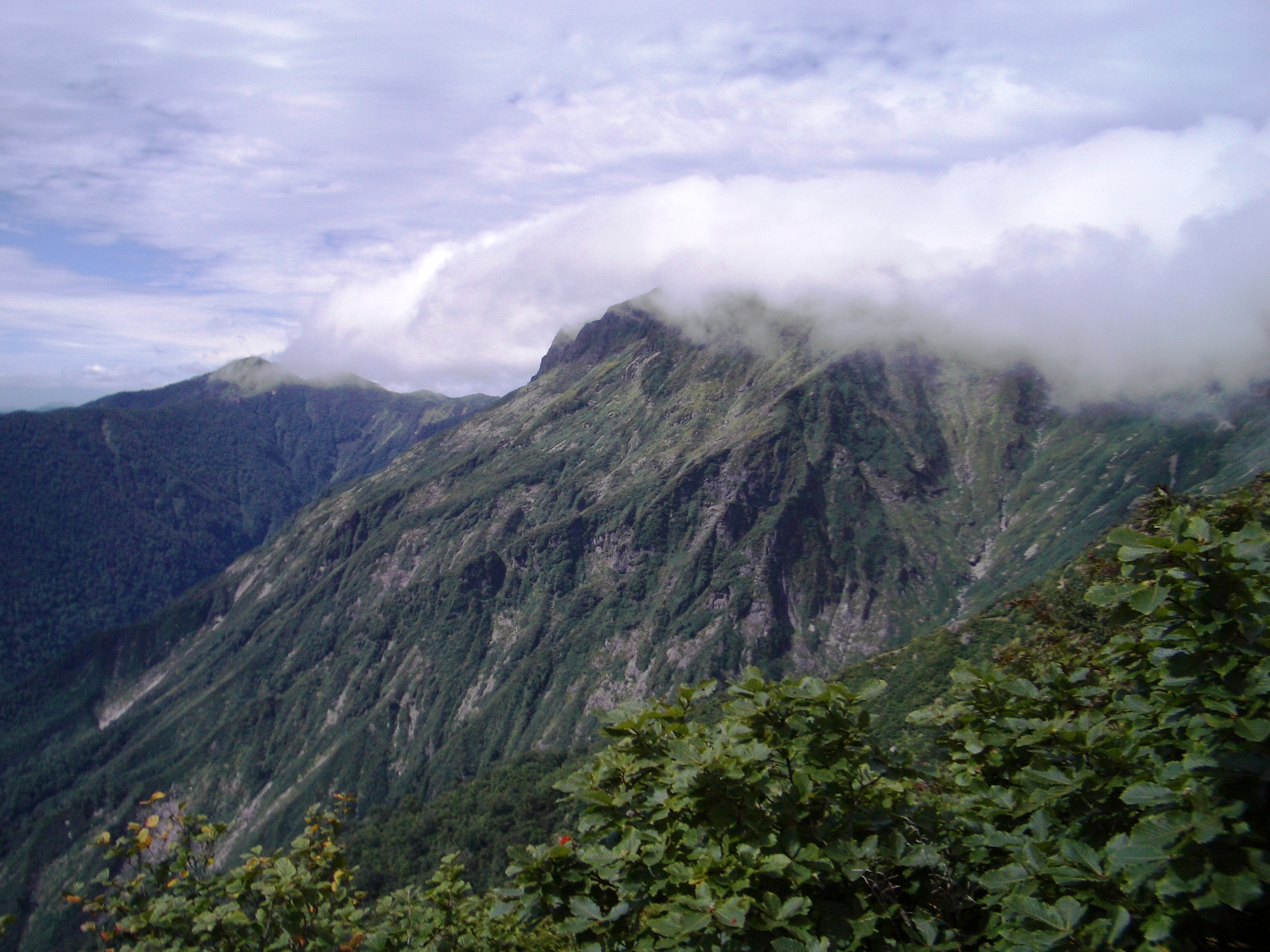
South wall of Mount Tanigawa

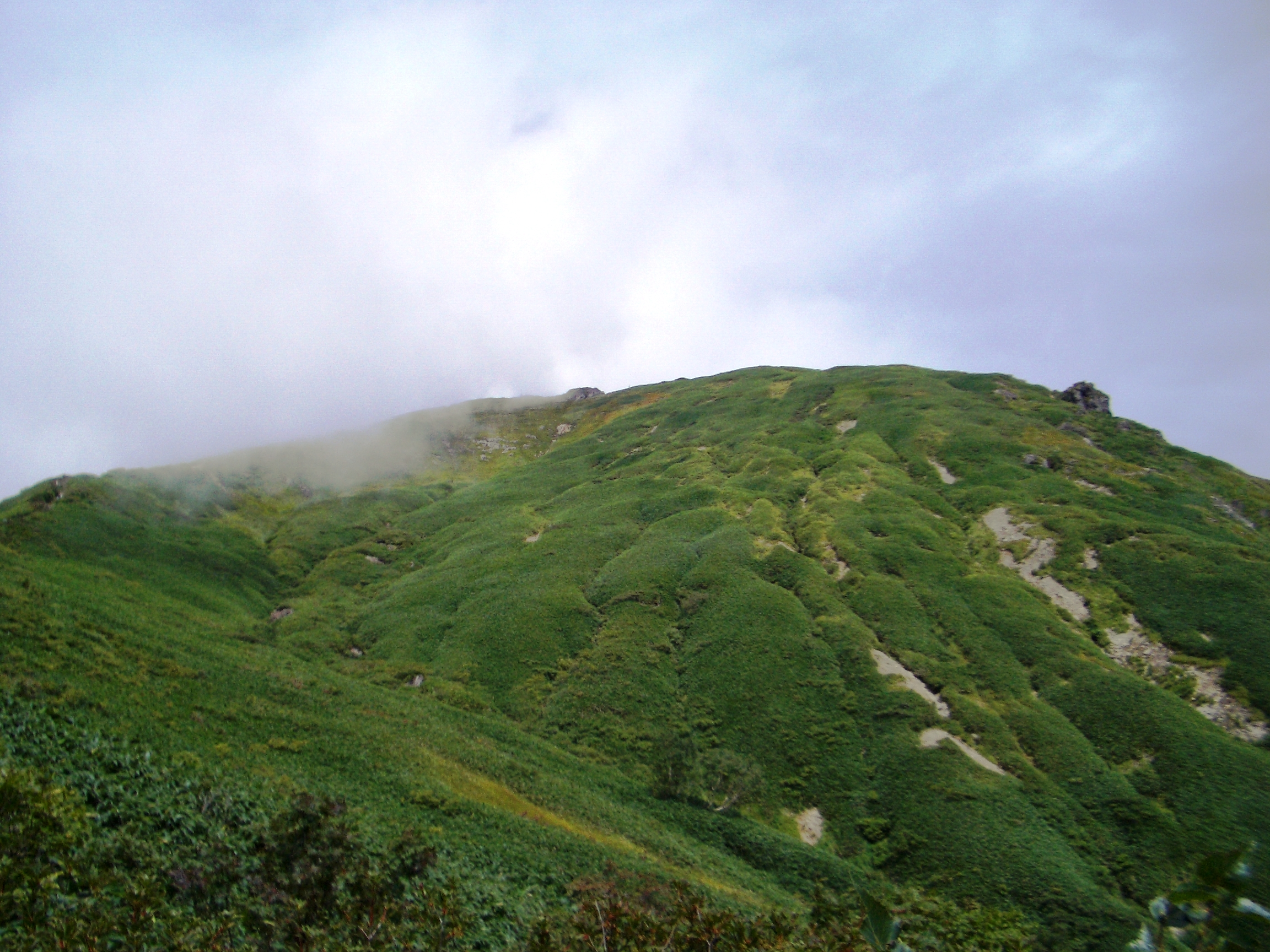
The route to the top of Mount Tanigawa

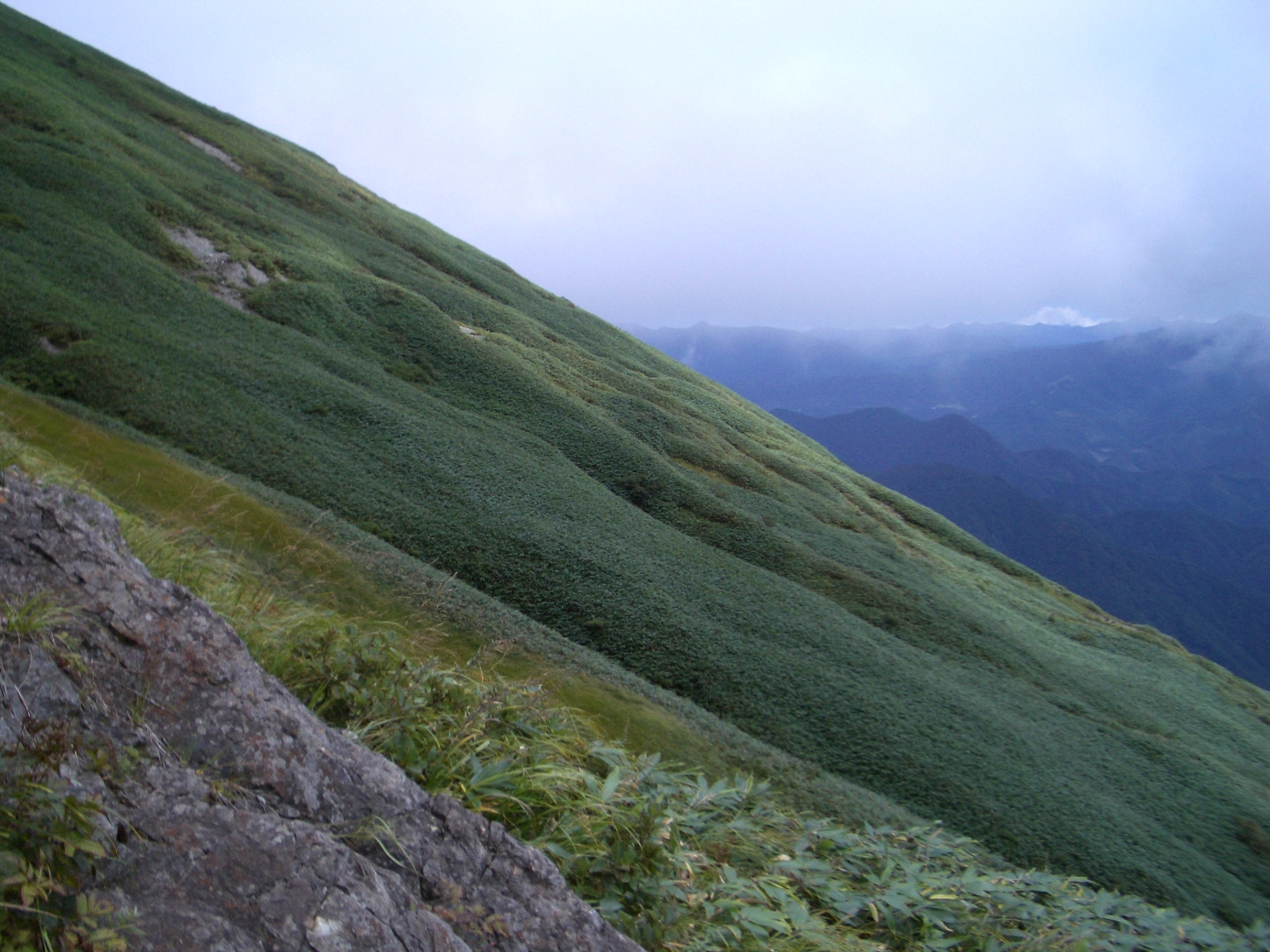
South slope of Mount Tanigawa

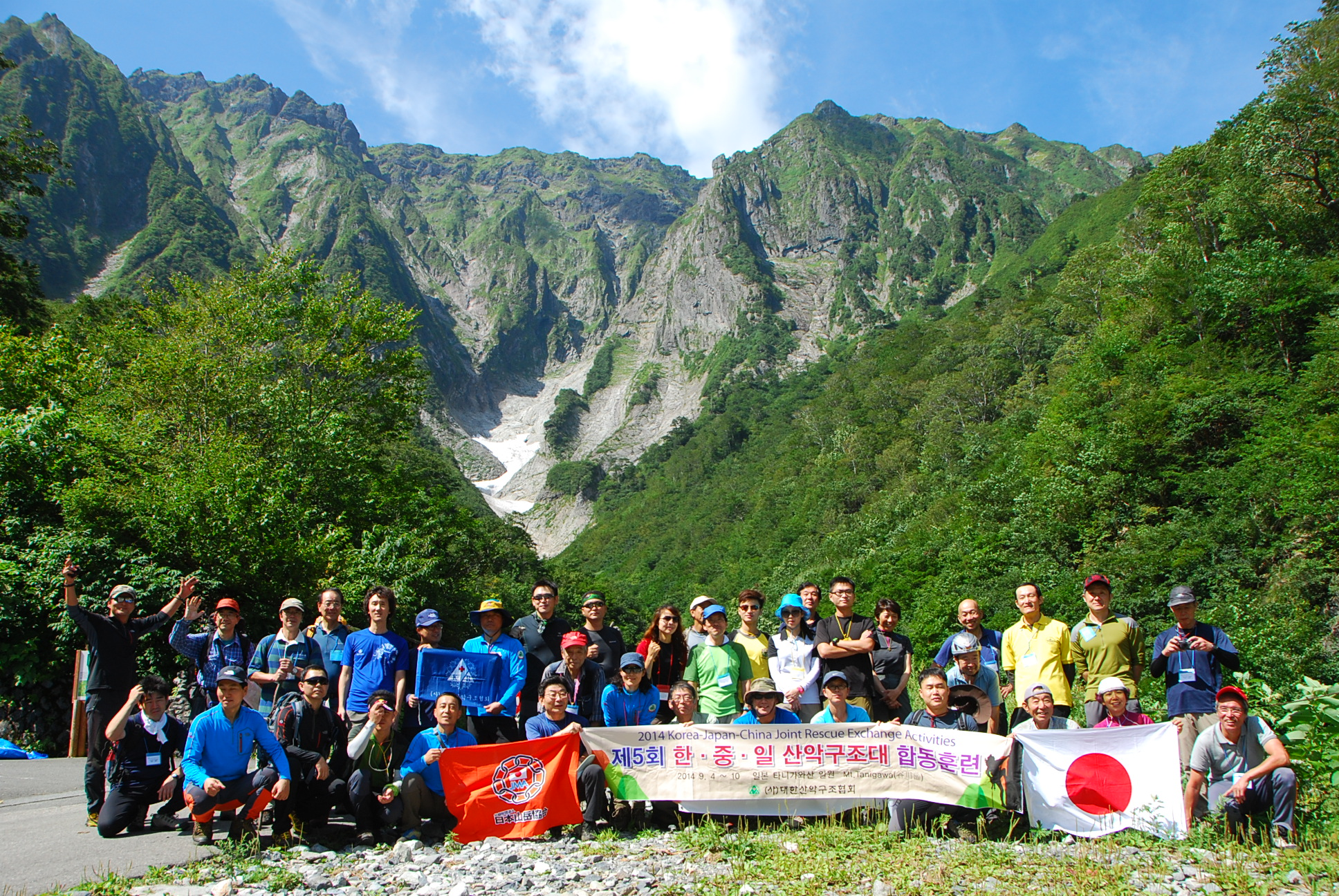
Korea-Japan-China Joint Rescue training

== See also ==
- List of the 100 famous mountains in Japan
- Tanigawadake Ropeway
