= Interstate 291 =

Interstate 291 is the designation for two Interstate Highways in the United States, both of which are related to Interstate 91:

- Interstate 291 (Massachusetts), a connector to Interstate 90/Massachusetts Turnpike in Springfield
- Interstate 291 (Connecticut), a connector to Interstate 84 near Hartford
