= Shimizu Tunnel =

Railway tunnel in Japan

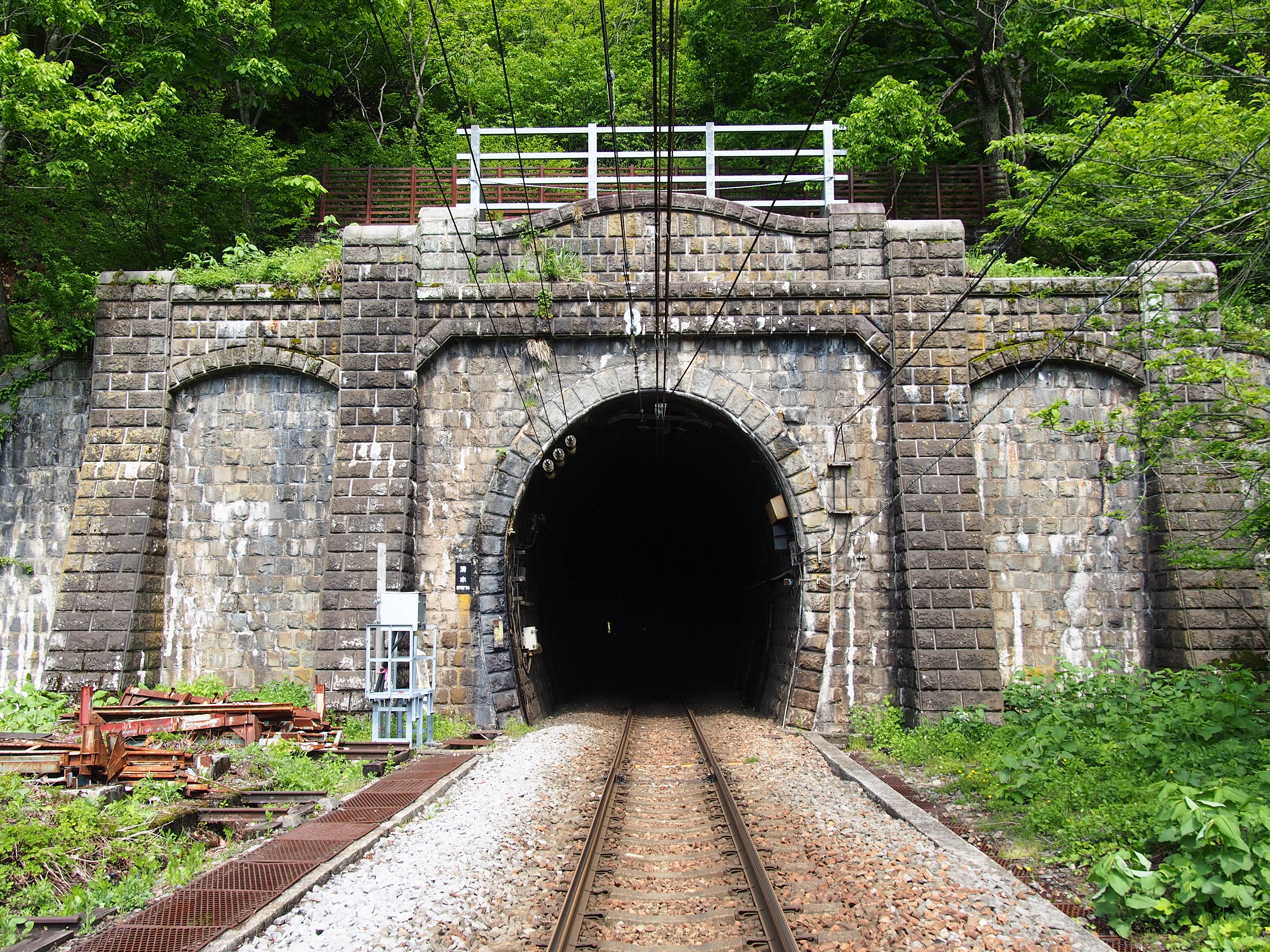
- Entrance of Shimizu tunnel

Overview
- Line: Jōetsu Line
- Location: Gunma and Niigata Prefectures, Japan
- Coordinates: 36°50′45.5″N 138°55′53″E

Operation
- Opened: 1931
- Operator: JR East

Shimizu Tunnel (清水トンネル, Shimizu-tonneru) is a railroad tunnel in Gunma and Niigata Prefectures of Japan, operated by JR East Jōetsu Line. The name originates from the Shimizu mountain pass nearby. There are three tunnels near each other, which are the Shimizu Tunnel, the Shin-Shimizu Tunnel, and the Daishimizu Tunnel.

== Shimizu tunnel ==
The Shimizu tunnel is the oldest of the three, opened in 1931 after nine years of construction. The length of the tunnel is 9,702 m (6.03 mi), and has a single track. This tunnel was the longest in Japan at the time. Because of technical difficulties at the time, in addition to the main tunnel, two spiral tunnels were built along the mountain pass route, with a curve radius of 800 m (2,600 ft).

The construction improved the journey time between Niigata and Tokyo, decreasing it by 4 hours since trains no longer needed to go through the Usui Pass. Because the tunnel was too long to be suitable for steam locomotives, the tracks in and around the tunnel were electrified from the beginning.

== Shin-Shimizu Tunnel ==
The Shin-Shimizu Tunnel (新清水トンネル, Arashimizu ton'neru) was constructed in 1967 (mostly parallel to the Shimizu Tunnel) to enable conversion of the Joetsu Line from single track to double track, due to an increase in traffic volume on the Joetsu Line. The Shin-Shimizu tunnel is 13,500 m (8.4 mi) long and is used for northbound trains (toward Nagaoka), with southbound trains (toward Minakami) using the Shimizu tunnel.

== Daishimizu Tunnel ==
The Daishimizu Tunnel (大清水トンネル, Ōshimizu ton'neru) is a railway tunnel on the Jōetsu Shinkansen railway line on the border of Gunma Prefecture and Niigata Prefecture, Japan.

The Daishimizu tunnel was completed in 1978 in preparation for use by the Jōetsu Shinkansen that was to be completed in 1982. This tunnel was the world's longest railway tunnel at 22.2 km (13.8 mi) until the Seikan Tunnel was built. When this tunnel was completed, the travel time between Niigata and Tokyo went down to approximately one hour and forty minutes, three hours faster than using the Jōetsu Line.
