= Interstate 295 =

Interstate 295 is the designation for the following eight Interstate Highways in the United States, all of which are related to I-95:

- Interstate 295 (Delaware–Pennsylvania), a bypass of Philadelphia, Pennsylvania
- Interstate 295 (Florida), a beltway around central Jacksonville
- Interstate 295 (Maine), an alternate route through and north of Portland
- Interstate 295 (Maryland–District of Columbia), a connector route in Washington, D.C.
- Interstate 295 (New York), a connector route in Queens and Bronx counties
- Interstate 295 (North Carolina), a bypass of Fayetteville
- Interstate 295 (Rhode Island–Massachusetts), a bypass of Providence, Rhode Island
- Interstate 295 (Virginia), a bypass of Richmond and Petersburg
