= Daishimizu Tunnel =

Railway tunnel in Japan

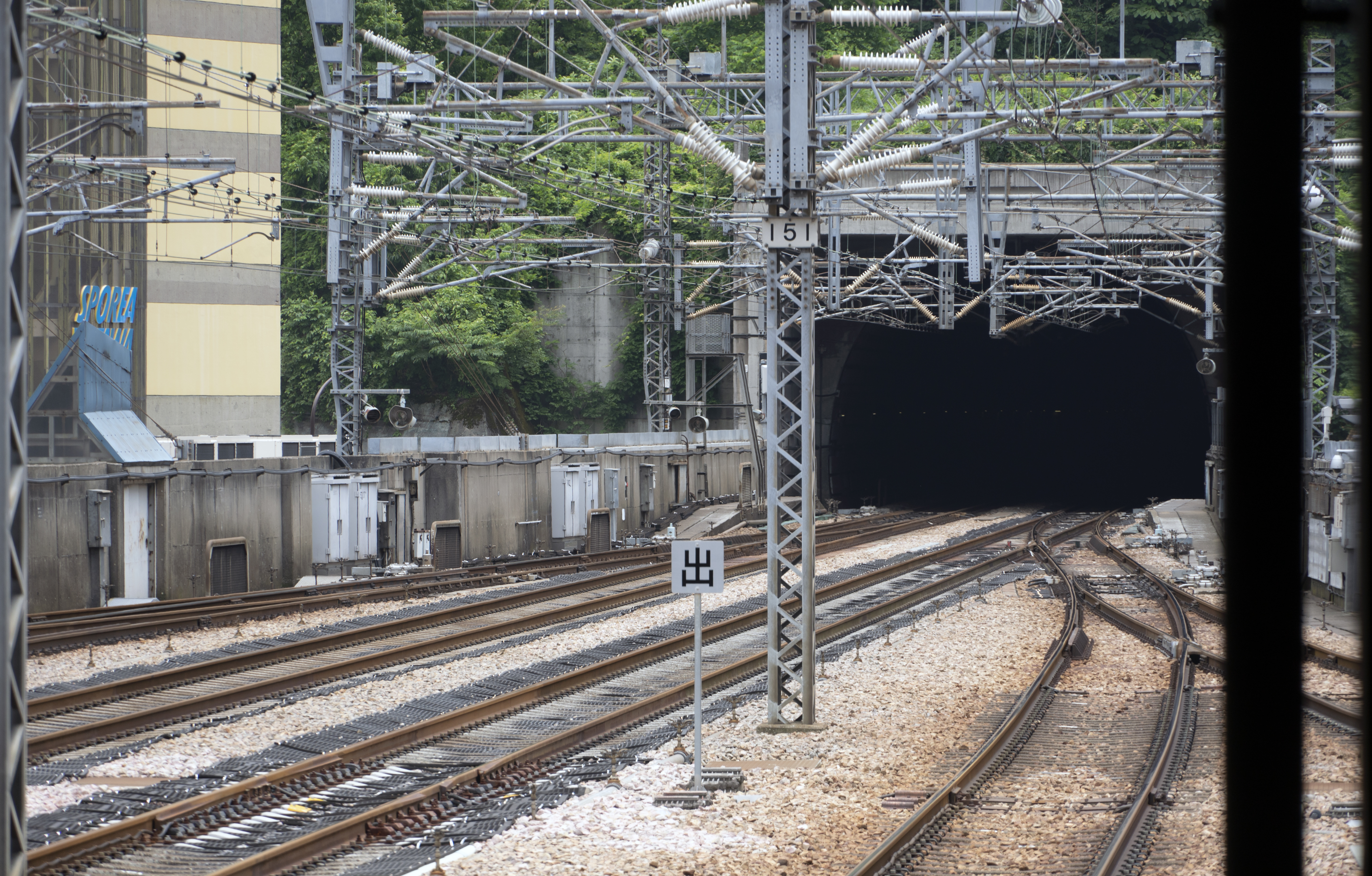
- North portal of Daishimizu Tunnel
- Interactive map of Daishimizu Tunnel

Overview
- Line: Jōetsu Shinkansen
- Coordinates: 36.8296°N 138.917°E
- Status: Active

Operation
- Opened: 1982

Technical
- Line length: 22.2 km (13.8 mi)

The Daishimizu Tunnel (大清水トンネル) is a railway tunnel on the Jōetsu Shinkansen on the border of Gunma Prefecture and Niigata Prefecture, Japan. The goal of Daishimizu Tunnel was to improve transport and logistics between the Tokyo area Kantō Plain on the Pacific coast, and the northeastern or coastal plain of the Niigata region along the Sea of Japan. Both lowland areas are separated by the mountains dominating the spinal cord or mid-section of the entire island.

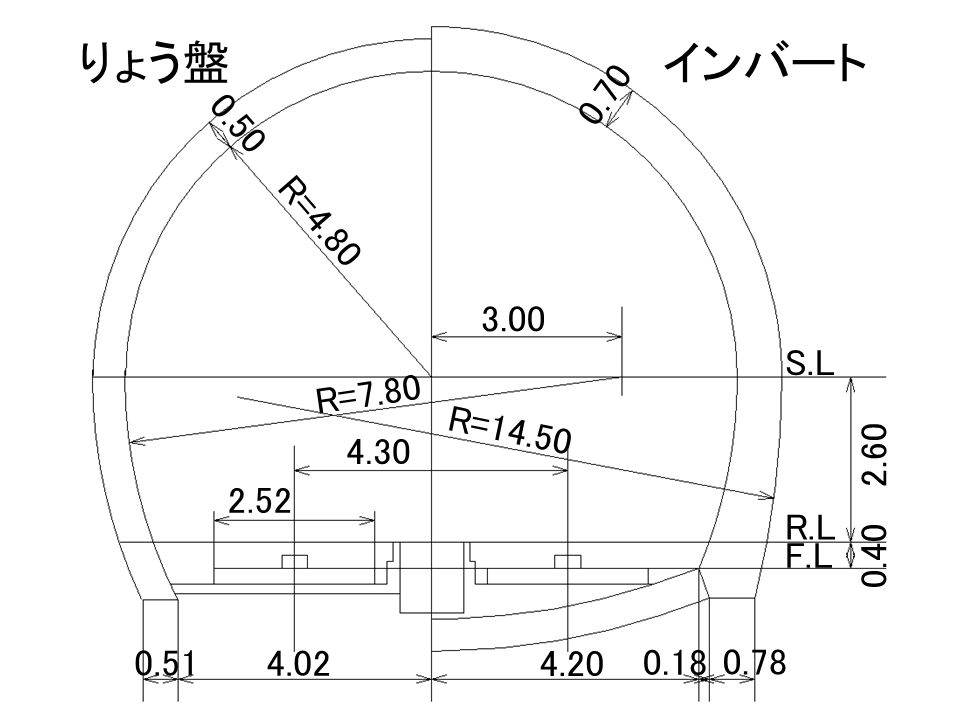
Standard tunnel profile of Joetsu shinkansen

In 1978, the Dai-Shimizu tunnel was completed. This tunnel was dug for the Jōetsu Shinkansen that was to be completed in 1982. This tunnel was the world's longest railway tunnel at 22.2 km (13.8 mi) until the Seikan Tunnel was built. During the construction, a fire created a large amount of smoke in the tunnel, and 16 workers died from carbon monoxide poisoning. When this tunnel was completed, the travel time between Niigata and Tokyo went down to approximately one hour and forty minutes, three hours faster than using the Jōetsu Line.

Also, when this tunnel was built, natural water was found during construction, which is now sold in bottles.

Records
Preceded by Simplon Tunnel	Longest tunnel 1982–1988	Succeeded by Seikan Tunnel
