= Prince Hotels =

Japanese hotel chain

SEIBU PRINCE HOTELS WORLDWIDE INC.
- Native name: 株式会社西武・プリンスホテルズワールドワイド; Kabushiki-gaisha Seibu Purinsu Hoteruzu Warudowaido
- Type: Kabushiki gaisha
- Industry: Hotels
- Founded: 4 June 1956
- Headquarters: 3-1-5 Higashi Ikebukuro, Toshima-ku, Tokyo, Japan
- Parent: Seibu Holdings, Inc.
- Subsidiaries: StayWell Holdings
- Website: www.princehotels.com

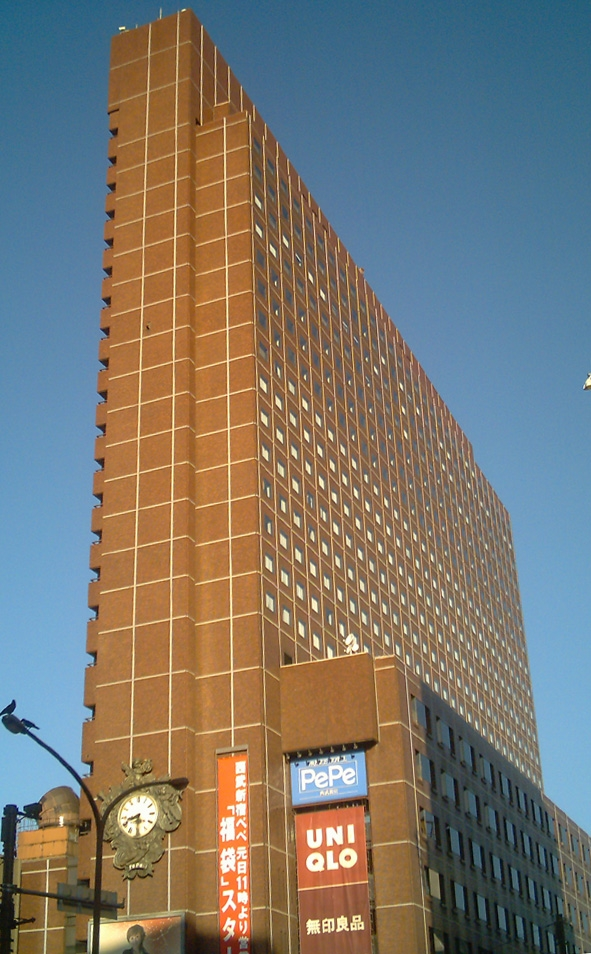
Shinjuku Prince Hotel, incorporating Seibu-Shinjuku railway station

Prince Hotels, Inc. (株式会社プリンスホテル, Kabushiki-gaisha Purinsu Hoteru) is a hotel chain headquartered in Toshima-ku, Tokyo, Japan. It is a subsidiary of Seibu Holdings, Inc. Together with Seibu Railway, Prince Hotels is the core company of Seibu Group.

== Overview ==
During the Allied occupation of Japan following World War II, many members of the Japanese peerage lost their titles and were subject to crippling taxation on their real estate holdings. Yasujirō Tsutsumi, who controlled the Seibu Railway through the Kokudo Corporation, arranged to buy several of these families' properties at a discount and used them to develop hotels. The first of these hotels, the Grand Prince Hotel Takanawa, opened in 1953 on the site of the Takeda-no-miya residence. The Tokyo Prince Hotel opened in 1964 on a site that originally housed graves of several Tokugawa family shoguns, whose bodies were moved to the neighboring temple of Zojo-ji.

Originally, hotels branded as Prince Hotels were not wholly owned by Prince Hotels Company, but were instead operated by different companies, such as Seibu Railway, Kokudo, or Izuhakone Railway. The management system of Prince Hotels was described as "debt operation" by the media. It borrowed funds from banks, developed land using the funds, and borrowed more funds with the growth of land values. The system worked in the 1960s with Japanese economic growth, until the 1990s when the bubble economy burst.

Under the reorganization of the Seibu Group following the de-listing of Seibu Railway in 2005, Prince Hotels Company merged with Kokudo. All the Prince Hotels are now operated by Prince Hotels Company. Because of the unreasonable expansion in the past, the company has many underperforming facilities. Under the current plan of turnaround, it closed, sold, and plans to close or sell roughly 40 facilities.

=== Reorganization ===
Tsutsumi registered Seibu Railway shares owned by Kokudo in the names of various affiliated individuals, often without their permission, so that the true ownership of the company was not readily apparent. Following the death of Tsutsumi in 1964, his third son Yoshiaki Tsutsumi inherited control of Kokudo and continued the practice of falsifying shareholder records. His holdings in Kokudo and Seibu led to his being deemed the "world's richest man" by Forbes magazine for four consecutive years from 1987 to 1990, with estimated net worth of $15–20 billion during the height of the Japanese asset bubble. He was arrested on securities fraud charges in March 2005.

On December 21, 2005, Seibu Railway was delisted from the Tokyo Stock Exchange. A reorganization of the group, completed in February 2006, created Seibu Holdings to act as a holding company for both the railway and Prince Hotels. Cerberus Capital Management, an American investment fund, became the largest shareholder in Seibu Holdings with a 29.9% share of the new company.

In late 2012 and early 2013, Cerberus proposed that Seibu Railway abolish five non-core lines, along with other restructuring measures throughout the Seibu Holdings group, but management refused to implement these changes. Cerberus then executed a tender offer to increase its stake to 35% as of June 2013, giving Cerberus the power to veto shareholder resolutions. Cerberus had aimed to raise its stake to 44%, bringing it closer to an outright majority, but Seibu management engaged in a massive campaign to thwart the tender offer, including advertising within Seibu trains to passengers who owned stock. The East Japan Railway Company and several financial institutions also planned a support scheme to keep Cerberus from acquiring control of Seibu, but it was ultimately not implemented due to a lack of potential financial benefit for the investors. At the June 2013 shareholder meeting, several proposals by Cerberus were voted down, including the election of outside directors and the abolition of non-core lines.

As of June 2013, Yoshiaki Tsutsumi remains a major investor in Seibu Holdings through his 36% investment in NW Corporation, the second-largest shareholder in the company with a share of around 15%. Tsutsumi refused to respond to the Cerberus tender offer at the urging of Seibu management.

== Hotels ==
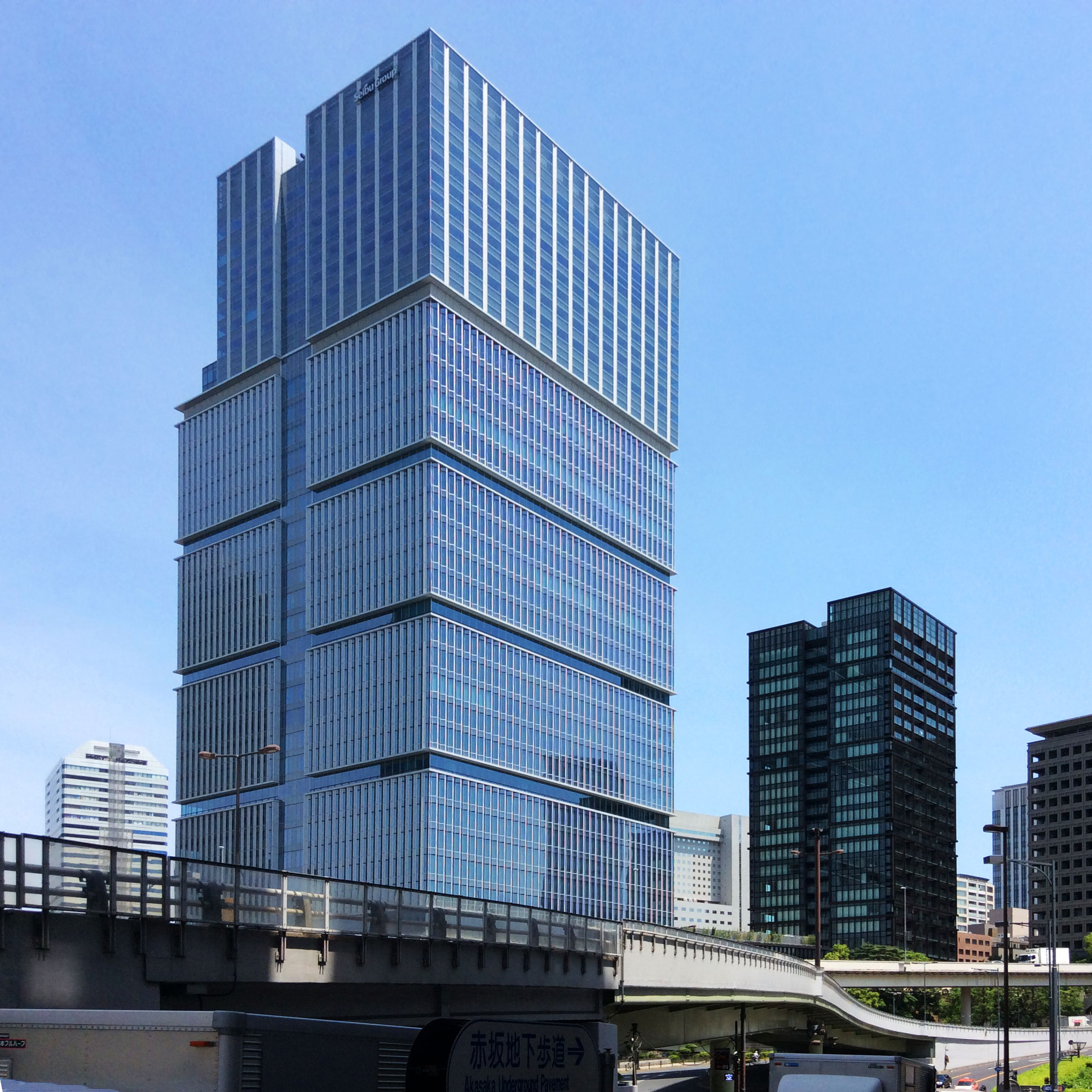
The Prince Gallery Tokyo Kioicho

The following list uses the English translations of the hotel names.

=== The Prince Gallery ===
- The Prince Gallery Tokyo Kioicho (affiliated with Marriott International under The Luxury Collection brand; part of the Seibu owned Tokyo Garden Terrace Kioicho development)

=== The Prince ===
The Prince is the brand name for the most luxurious hotels by the company.

- The Prince Hakone: Hakone, Kanagawa
- The Prince Karuizawa: Karuizawa, Nagano
- The Prince Kyoto Takaragaike: Sakyō-ku, Kyoto (affiliated with Marriott International under Autograph Collection brand)
- The Prince Park Tower Tokyo: Minato, Tokyo
- The Prince Sakura Tower Tokyo: Minato, Tokyo (affiliated with Marriott International under Autograph Collection brand)
- The Prince Villa Karuizawa: Karuizawa, Nagano

=== Grand Prince Hotels ===
Grand Prince Hotels is the brand name for city hotels.

- Grand Prince Hotel Hiroshima: Minami-ku, Hiroshima
- Grand Prince Hotel New Takanawa: Minato, Tokyo
- Grand Prince Hotel Takanawa: Minato, Tokyo

=== Prince Hotels (Japan) ===
- Furano Prince Hotel: Furano, Hokkaidō
- Hakodate Ōnuma Prince Hotel: Nanae, Hokkaidō
- Kamakura Prince Hotel: Kamakura, Kanagawa
- Karuizawa Asama Prince Hotel: Karuizawa, Nagano
- Karuizawa Prince Hotel East: Karuizawa, Nagano
- Karuizawa Prince Hotel West: Karuizawa, Nagano
- Kawagoe Prince Hotel: Kawagoe, Saitama
- Kushiro Prince Hotel: Kushiro, Hokkaidō
- Kussharo Prince Hotel: Teshikaga, Hokkaidō
- Manza Prince Hotel: Tsumagoi, Gunma
- Naeba Prince Hotel: Yuzawa, Niigata
- Nagoya Prince Hotel Sky Tower: Nagoya, Aichi
- Nichinan Kaigan Nangō Prince Hotel: Nangō, Miyazaki
- Ōiso Prince Hotel: Ōiso, Kanagawa
- Ōtsu Prince Hotel: Ōtsu, Shiga
- Sapporo Prince Hotel: Chūō-ku, Sapporo, Hokkaidō.
- Shiga Kōgen Prince Hotel: Yamanouchi, Nagano
- Shimoda Prince Hotel: Shimoda, Shizuoka
- Shin Yokohama Prince Hotel: Kōhoku-ku, Yokohama
- Shin Furano Prince Hotel: Furano, Hokkaidō
- Shinagawa Prince Hotel: Minato, Tokyo
- Shinjuku Prince Hotel: Shinjuku, Tokyo
- Shizukuishi Prince Hotel: Shizukuishi, Iwate
- Sunshine City Prince Hotel: Toshima, Tokyo
- Towada Prince Hotel: Kosaka, Akita
- Tsumagoi Prince Hotel: Tsumagoi, Gunma
- Tōkyō Prince Hotel: Minato, Tokyo

=== Others ===
- Ashinokohan Takagowa Onsen Fuyō-Tei (ryokan): Hakone, Kanagawa
- Ashinokohan Takagowa Onsen Ryūgūden (ryokan): Hakone, Kanagawa
- Chigataki Prince Hotel: Non-public, Emperor's villa.
- Hakone En Cottage West: Hakone, Kanagawa
- Hakone En Cottage Camping: Hakone, Kanagawa
- Hakone Yunohana Onsen Hotel: Hakone, Kanagawa
- Hotel Daihakone: Hakone, Kanagawa
- Hotel Sea Paradise Inn: Kanazawa-ku, Yokohama
- Izu Nagaoka Onsen Sanyō-Sō (ryokan): Izunokuni, Shizuoka
- Kawana Hotel: Itō, Shizuoka
- Ryūgūden (ryokan): Hakone, Kanagawa
- The Hotel Seiryu Kyoto Kiyomizu: Higashiyama-ku, Kyoto

=== Overseas ===
Prince Resorts Hawaii:

- Prince Waikiki Hotel: Honolulu, Hawaii
  - Hawaii Prince Golf Club
- The Westin Hapuna Beach Resort: Kohala Coast, Hawaii (formerly Hapuna Beach Prince Hotel, branded as Westin as part of an agreement with Marriott)
  - Hapuna Golf Course
- Mauna Kea Beach Hotel: Kohala Coast, Hawaii (affiliated with Marriott International under the Autograph Collection brand)
  - Mauna Kea Golf Course
- Nice Prince Hotel: Chiayi, Taiwan

=== StayWell Holdings ===
- The Prince Akatoki London
- Park Regis
- Leisure Inn

=== Previous Hotel Properties ===
- Alyeska Prince Hotel, Girdwood, Alaska (now Alyeska Resort)
- Grand Prince Hotel Akasaka: Chiyoda, Tokyo (closed March 31, 2011)
- Maui Prince Hotel, Wailea-Makena, Hawaii (now Makena Beach and Golf Resort )
- Toronto Prince Hotel, Toronto, Ontario (now Crowne Plaza Toronto North York)
- Prince Hotel & Residence Kuala Lumpur: Kuala Lumpur, Malaysia (now Pullman Kuala Lumpur City Centre Hotel & Residence)
- Kitakyushu Prince Hotel: Yahatanishi-ku, Kitakyūshū (closed February 25, 2007, now Crown Palais Kitakyushu)
- Aso Prince Hotel: Aso, Kumamoto Prefecture
- Gloria Prince Hotel: Taipei, Taiwan

== Ski areas and aerial lifts ==
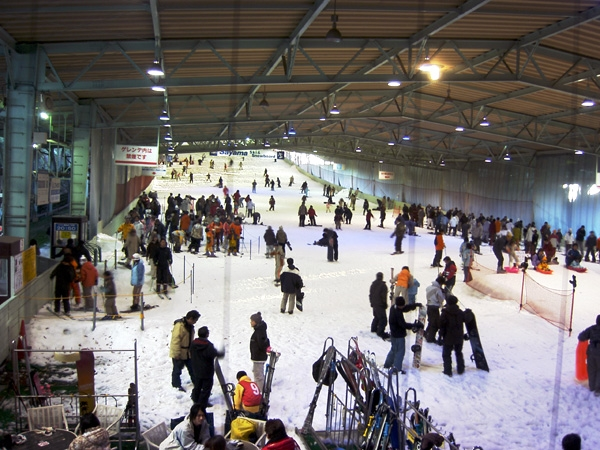
Sayama Ski Resort

Chairlifts are excluded.

- Furano Ski Resort : Furano, Hokkaidō
  - Furano Ropeway
  - Kitanomine Gondola
- Shizukuishi Ski Resort: Shizukuishi, Iwate
  - Shizukuishi Gondola
  - Ropeway
- Karuizawa Prince Hotel Ski Resort: Karuizawa, Nagano
- Manza Onsen Ski Resort: Tsumagoi, Gunma
- Mt. Naeba Snow Resort: Yuzawa, Niigata
  - Naeba Ski Resort
    - Prince First Gondola
    - Prince Second Gondola
    - Naeba Tashiro Gondola (Dragondola)
  - Kagura Ski Resort (Kagura Area, Mitsumata Gelände, and Tashiro Area): Yuzawa, Niigata
    - Kagura Gondola
    - Mitsumata Ropeway
    - Tashiro Ropeway
- Muikamachi Hakkaisan Ski Resort: Minamiuonuma, Niigata
  - Hakkaisan Ropeway
- Myōkō Suginohara Ski Resort: Myōkō, Niigata
  - Myōkō Suginohara Gondola
- Sayama Ski Resort: Tokorozawa, Saitama
- Shiga Kōgen Yakebitaiyama Ski Resort: Yamanouchi, Nagano
  - Yakebitaiyama First Gondola
  - Yakebitaiyama Second Gondola

== Toll roads ==
- Manza Highway: Tsumagoi, Gunma
- Onioshi Highway: Karuizawa, Nagano–Tsumagoi, Gunma

== See also ==
- Seibu Railway
- Saitama Seibu Lions
- Yokohama Hakkeijima Sea Paradise
