= Naeba Ski Resort =

Ski resort in Yuzawa, Niigata, Japan

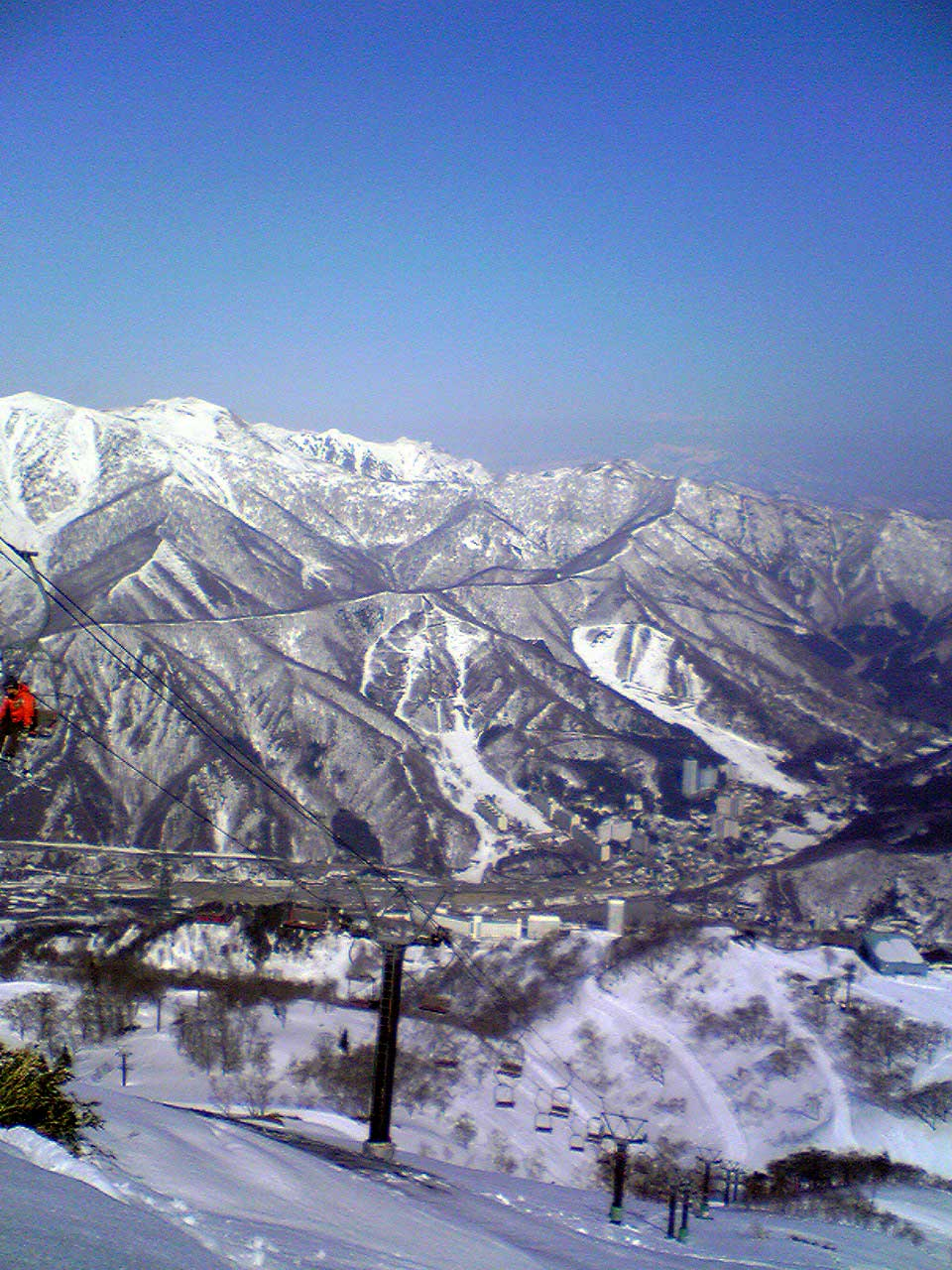
- A view from top of Mt. Takenoko

- Location in Japan
- Location: Yuzawa, Niigata, Japan
- Coordinates: 36.791°N 138.785°E
- Vertical: 889 m (2,917 ft)
- Top elevation: 1,789 m (5,869 ft)
- Base elevation: 900 m (2,953 ft)
- Skiable area: 196 ha (484 acres)
- Trails: 16
- Longest run: 4.0 km (2.5 mi)
- Lift system: 23; 3 gondola lifts 7 quad chairlifts 13 pair chairlifts
- Website: Mt.Naeba

Naeba Ski Resort (苗場スキー場, Naeba Sukī-jō) is a ski resort on the eastern slope of Mount Takenoko (筍山) in Yuzawa (湯沢町), Niigata Prefecture.

This ski resort was formerly run by Kokudo, and currently is run by Prince Hotel, which merged with Kokudo in 2006. Naeba is one of the most popular ski resorts in Japan due to its accessible location from Tokyo and relatively long snow season with snow making machines. On the bottom, Naeba Prince Hotel, which has 1,299 rooms, 20 restaurants, convenience stores, and other facilities, serves skiers. On top of the hotel, skiers can choose their accommodations from various types of hotels and ryokans, some of which has hot spring baths, in nearby Asagai town. Naeba Ski Resort composes Mt. Naeba Ski Resort with Kagura Ski Areas by combining both areas with Doragondola. On the opposite mountain across Asagai town, a small Asagai Area accommodates mainly family skiers.

The resort is 40 minutes from Echigo-Yuzawa Station on the Joetsu Shinkansen by non-stop express bus. This station is approximately 190 km (120 mi) from Tokyo.

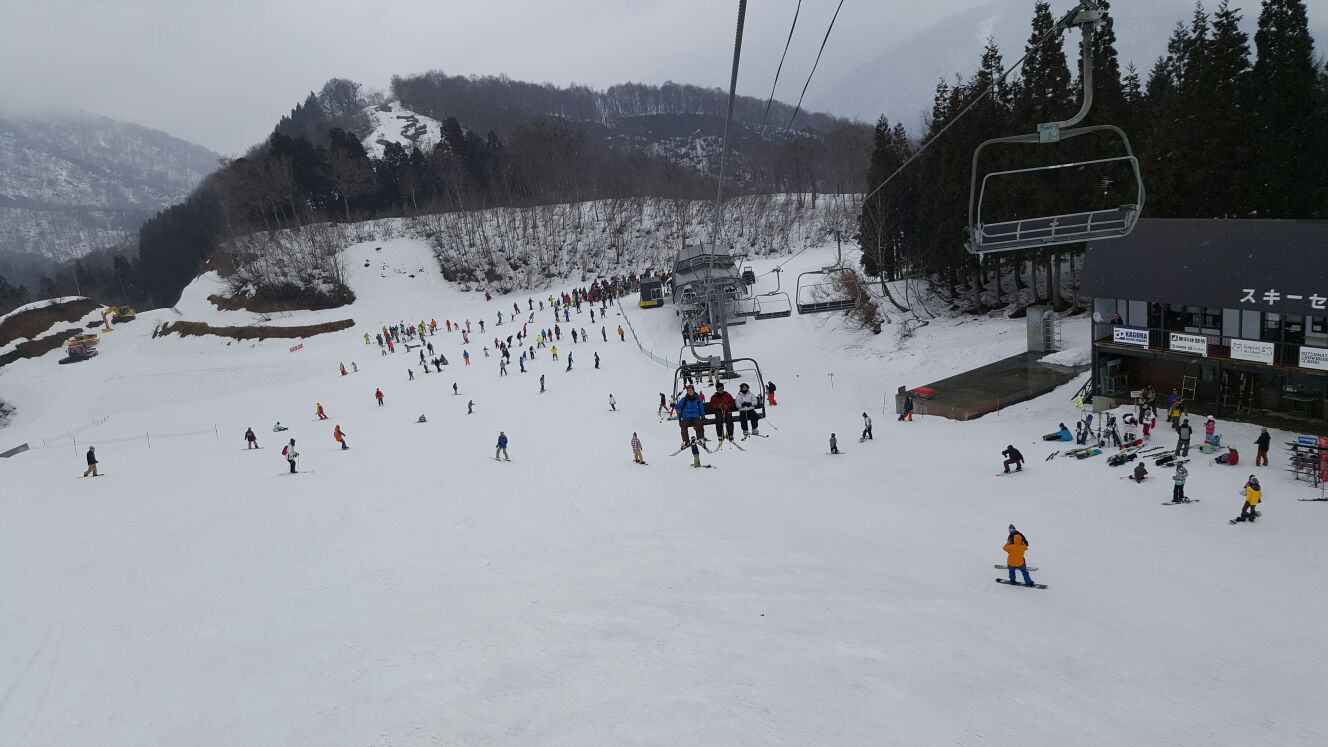
View of Kagura Ski resort from the ski lifts

== Skiing ==
The maximum slope is 32° on three slalom runs (called 'Bahn' in Japanese, from German); the longest run is 4.0 km (2.5 mi) and the vertical drop is 889 m (2,917 ft).

In addition to the extensive skiing at Naeba itself (two gondolas, 33 ski lifts), there is a third gondola 'Dragondola' connecting the resort to the Tashiro (田代) ski area, which in turn connects to the Mitsumata (三俣) and Kagura (かぐら) ski areas.

Naeba hosted World Cup races in 1973, 1975, 2016 and 2020.

== Other attractions ==
In the summer, the Naeba ski resort is home to Fuji Rock Festival.

In February, Matsutoya Yumi (松任谷由実) (a.k.a. 'Yuming') holds a series of late-night concerts in the hotel's Blizzardium ballroom / an exhibition space.
