= Japan Gold Disc Award =

Award

- Country: Japan
- Presented by: Recording Industry Association of Japan
- First award: 1987
- Website: Official website

The Japan Gold Disc Award (日本ゴールドディスク大賞, Nihon Gōrudo Disuku Taishō) is an award presented by the Recording Industry Association of Japan (RIAJ) in the field of music. The Japan Gold Disc Awards have multiple Grand Prix categories, including: Artist of the Year, Album of the Year, Song of the Year (download and streaming), single of the year, and more.

The awards are determined based on sales of CDs, music videos, paid music distribution, etc., over a year. The grand prize is "Artist of the Year," awarded to the artist with the highest total net sales during the period. The first award ceremony was held at the Akasaka Prince Hotel in March 1987.

== Ceremonies ==
Ed.	Year	Date	Venue	Ref.
1	1987		Akasaka Prince Hotel	
2	1988			
3	1989			
4	1990			
5	1991			
6	1992		NHK Hall	
7	1993			
8	1994			
9	1995			
10	1996			
11	1997			
12	1998			
13	1999			
14	2000			
15	2001	March 17, 2001		
16	2002			
17	2003	March 12, 2003	NHK Hall	
18	2004	March 10, 2004	NHK Hall	
19	2005	March 10, 2005	NHK Hall	
20	2006	March 9, 2006	NHK Hall	
21	2007	March 13, 2007	Grand Prince Hotel Akasaka	
22	2008	March 4, 2008	Tokyo International Forum	
23	2009	March 2, 2009	Tokyo International Forum	
24	2010	February 24, 2010	Tokyo	
25	2011	January 5, 2011	Nicofarre, Roppongi	
26	2012	January 27, 2012	Nicofarre, Roppongi	
27	2013	January 7, 2013		
28	2014	February 27, 2014		
29	2015	March 2, 2015		
30	2016	February 26, 2016		
31	2017	February 26, 2017		
32	2018	February 26, 2018		
33	2019	February 25, 2019		
34	2020	February 26, 2020		
35	2021	March 15, 2021		
36	2022	March 14, 2022		
37	2023	March 10, 2023		
38	2024	March 13, 2024		
39	2025	March 12, 2025		
40	2026	March 11, 2026		

== Criteria ==
=== Winner criteria ===
The awards are determined based on sales of CDs, music videos, paid music distribution, etc., over a year. The grand prize is "Artist of the Year," awarded to the artist with the highest total net sales during the period. From the 20th edition, video sales were included in the "Artist of the Year" award from the 22nd edition, and digital music sales were included.

=== Eligible period ===
The eligible period was one year from January 21 of the previous year, from the 1st edition (1987) to the 13th edition (1999), but was extended by 11 days for the 14th edition (2000). Also, from the 15th edition (2001) to the 17th edition (2003), it was one year from February 1 of the previous year. Still, the 18th edition was changed to January 1 to December 31 of the previous year. Therefore, the winning works from the 17th award were not eligible for the 18th award, even if they were released during the eligible period (works released between January 1 and January 31, 2003, which overlapped the period of the 17th and 18th awards). The one-year eligible period was shortened to 10 months for the 25th edition (2011). For the 26th edition (2012) and 27th edition (2013), it was changed to one year (12 months) from November 1 of the year before. However, the 28th edition (2014) changed the period to 14 months. From the 29th edition (2015), the period was changed again to one year from January 1 of the previous year.

Ed.	Year	Eligible Period
1–13	1987–1999	January 21 of the previous year – January 20 of the ceremony year
14	2000	January 21, 1999 – January 31, 2000
15–17	2001–2003	February 1 of the previous year – January 31 of the ceremony year
18–24	2004–2010	January 1 – December 31 of the previous year
25	2011	January 1 – October 31, 2010
26	2012	November 1, 2010 – October 31, 2011
27	2013	November 1, 2011 – October 31, 2012
28	2014	November 1, 2012 – December 31, 2013
29–	2015–present	January 1 – December 31 of the previous year

== Categories ==
- Artist of the Year
- New Artist of the Year
- Best Enka/Kayokyoku Artist
- Best Enka/Kayokyoku New Artist
- Single of the Year
- Song of the Year by Download
- Song of the Year by Streaming
- Album of the Year
- Enka/Kayokyoku Album of the Year
- Classic Album of the Year
- Jazz Album of the Year
- Instrumental Album of the Year
- Soundtrack Album of the Year
- Animation Album of the Year
- Traditional Japanese Music Album of the Year
- Concept Album of the Year
- Music Video of the Year
- Special Award
- Best Asian Artist

== Artists of the Year ==
Ed.	Year	Japan	International	Ref.
1	1987	Akina Nakamori	Madonna	
2	1988	Rebecca	The Beatles	
3	1989	Boøwy	Bon Jovi	
4	1990	Southern All Stars	Madonna	
5	1991	Yumi Matsutoya	Madonna	
6	1992	Chage and Aska	Guns N' Roses	
7	1993	Chage and Aska	Madonna	
8	1994	Wands	The Beatles	
9	1995	TRF	Mariah Carey	
10	1996	TRF	Mariah Carey	
11	1997	Namie Amuro	Me & My	
12	1998	Glay	Celine Dion	
13	1999	B'z	Celine Dion	
14	2000	Hikaru Utada	Celine Dion	
15	2001	Ayumi Hamasaki	The Beatles	
16	2002	Ayumi Hamasaki	Backstreet Boys	
17	2003	Hikaru Utada	Avril Lavigne	
18	2004	Ayumi Hamasaki	Twelve Girls Band	
19	2005	Orange Range	Queen	
20	2006	Kumi Koda	O-Zone	
21	2007	Kumi Koda	Daniel Powter	
22	2008	Exile	Avril Lavigne	
23	2009	Exile	Madonna	
24	2010	Arashi	The Beatles	
25	2011	Arashi	Lady Gaga	
26	2012	AKB48	Lady Gaga	
27	2013	AKB48	Che'Nelle	
28	2014	AKB48	One Direction	
29	2015	Arashi	One Direction	
30	2016	Arashi	The Beatles	
31	2017	Arashi	Ariana Grande	
32	2018	Namie Amuro	The Beatles	
33	2019	Namie Amuro	Queen	
34	2020	Arashi	Queen	
35	2021	Arashi	Queen	
36	2022	Snow Man	The Beatles	
37	2023	Snow Man	The Beatles	
38	2024	Snow Man	The Beatles	
39	2025	Mrs. Green Apple	Taylor Swift	
40	2026	Snow Man	The Beatles	

== Broadcast ==
The first event was not broadcast on television. The first broadcast live was in 1990 (4th edition) on Nippon Television's "Saturday Super Special".

The following year, in 1991, it began to be broadcast live on NHK General TV, and the year after that, in 1992, it was broadcast publicly at the NHK Hall. Later, it was also broadcast on Satellite TV 2 (BS2). BS2 began broadcasting live, and the broadcast on General TV was a re-edited recording. Also, from 2003, the broadcast on BS2 was changed to a live broadcast recording on the same day. Until then, NHK News 7 had replaced Satellite TV 1 (BS1) and was broadcast.

The 20th anniversary of the NHK's founding, the NHK Hall, was held in 2006, on Thursday, March 9, from 7:00 PM, and was broadcast live on Satellite Channel 2 (7:30 PM - 9:30 PM). A recording was also broadcast on General TV. Still, the original broadcast on Friday, March 17 was postponed to Thursday, March 23 ( 12:15 AM - 1:25 AM, March 24) due to the decision to broadcast a recording of the National Diet session (164th Diet, House of Representatives General Affairs Committee, FY2006 NHK Business Budget Deliberations) (11:00 PM - 4:00 AM, March 18), which has the highest legal priority.

In 2006 (the 21st edition), 2007 (the 22nd edition), 2009 (the 24th edition), and 2010 (the 25th edition), the award press conferences were held at hotels in Tokyo. There were no public audiences, live performances by artists, or television coverage. The press conferences were broadcast as news footage on the variety shows of various stations the following day.

The 2008 (23rd edition) event was held at Tokyo International Forum Hall C on March 2, 2009. It was broadcast live by Tokyo FM and on March 10 by Wowow.

The 2011 (26th edition) event was held at Nicofarre on January 27, 2012, and a digest of the event was broadcast on BS Sky PerfecTV! from 10:00 PM to 11:00 PM on March 2.

Press conferences have been abolished since 2012 (the 27th edition). Instead, the organizers have edited the winners' comments and broadcast them as videos. These have also not been held since 2014 (the 29th edition).
