= Seiji Tsutsumi =

Japanese author and poet (1927–2013)

- 堤 清二
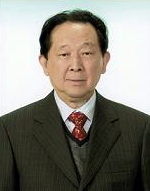
- Undated photo of Tsutsumi
- Born: March 30, 1927; Tokyo, Japan
- Died: November 25, 2013 (aged 86); Tokyo, Japan
- Other names: Takashi Tsuji; Ikuo Yokose
- Education: University of Tokyo
- Occupations: Entrepreneur; writer; poet
- Years active: 1954–2011
- Employers: Seibu Department Stores; Saison Group; Muji
- Organizations: PEN International (Director); Japan Art Academy
- Known for: Founder of Saison Group; Writer and poet
- Spouses: Motoko Yamaguchi (m. 1955; div. 1964); Asako Mizuno (m. 1968)
- Children: 2
- Parent: Yasujirō Tsutsumi (father)
- Relatives: Yoshiaki Tsutsumi (half-brother)
- Awards: Person of Cultural Merit (2012)

Seiji Tsutsumi (堤 清二, Tsutsumi Seiji; March 30, 1927 − November 25, 2013) was a Japanese businessperson, author and poet, also known by the pen names Takashi Tsujii (辻井 喬, Tsujii Takashi) and Ikuo Yokose (横瀬 郁夫, Yokose Ikuo).

== Background ==
Tsutsumi was the son of Yasujirō Tsutsumi, founder of the Seibu Railway company and a long-serving member, and eventually speaker, of Japan's House of Representatives.

He was born in Tokyo in 1927. During his childhood, he lived with his mother Misao and half-sister Kuniko. Misao wrote traditional Japanese poetry, which was Tsutsumi's initial introduction to writing. He later took up the practice himself, writing waka by his teen years; however, he would not publish any of his work until his late 20s.

After receiving his degree in economics from the University of Tokyo in 1951, he re-enrolled as a literature student and worked as a secretary to his father. He joined the Seibu Department Stores in 1954. Following the death of his father in 1964, he led the spin-off of its logistics business to form the Saison Group, which eventually included the Seibu department stores, Seiyu supermarkets, Wave (a music shop), Parco (shopping complex), and the Muji and Loft variety store chains. He resigned as head of Saison in 1991 following the collapse of the Japanese asset price bubble, but continued as head of the Saison Cultural Foundation, which he founded in 1987.

Just before the death of his father Yasujiro, his brother Yoshiaki Tsutsumi was nominated as his heir, potentially due to Seiji's brief involvement with the Japanese Communist Party after the Second World War.

In addition to his business career, he has also had a notable career as writer and poet under his pen name Takashi Tsujii, and served as Director of International PEN Club, Japan. His work has been translated into Arabic, Chinese, English, French, Korean, and Russian. Tsutsumi once described his writing career as an equalizer to his business ventures, and vice versa: "I find that I can get rid of the business stress by writing. And I can avoid getting consumed by writing problems by being preoccupied with business."

== Personal life ==
While working as a political secretary to his father, Tsutsumi met Motoko Yamaguchi. The two married in 1955 and had a son, Kōji; however, the pair divorced around 1964. He later wed Asako Mizuno in Paris in 1968. Mizuno later gave birth to Tsutsumi's second son, Takao.

== Death ==
Tsutsumi died of liver failure in Tokyo on November 25, 2013.

== Prizes ==
- 1994 Tanizaki Prize for Niji no misaki (Rainbow Cape, 虹の岬)
- 2004 Noma Literary Prize Chichi no shōzō (Portrait of My Father)
- 2012 Person of Cultural Merit

== English translations ==
- A spring like any other : a novel, translated by Beth Cary. Tokyo; New York : Kodansha International, 1992. ISBN 4-7700-1550-X.
- Disappearance of the butterfly, translated by Robert Brady & Susanne Akemi Wegmüller. Santa Fe: Katydid Books; Honolulu, Hawaii: Distributed by University of Hawaii Press, 1994. ISBN 0-942668-43-X.

== Selected works ==
- Hōkō no kisetsu no naka de, 1969.
- Shi doku henreki, 1975.
- Tsujii Takashi shishū, 1975.
- Kemonomichi wa kurai, 1977.
- Hako matawa shingō e no koshitsu, 1978.
- Shinʾya no dokusho, Tokyo : Shinchōsha, 1982.
- Itsumo to onaji haru (いつも と 同じ 春), Tōkyō : Kawade Shobō Shinsha, 1983.
- Fuan no shūhen (不安 の 周辺), Tokyo : Shinchōsha, 1985.
- Shōwa no shūen : 20-seiki shogainen no hōkai to mirai (昭和 の 終焉 : 20世紀 諸概念 の 崩壊 と 未来), Tōkyō : Toreviru : Hatsubai Riburo Pōto, 1986.
- Anʾya henreki (暗夜 遍歴), Tōkyō : Shinchōsha, 1987.
- Yōnaki hito no (ようなき 人 の), Tōkyō : Shichōsha, 1989.
- Yoshimoto Takaaki "itsutsu no taiwa" (吉本 隆明 「五つ の 対話」), Tōkyō : Shinchōsha, 1990.
- Kokkyō no owari : yo no owari no tame no yonshō (国境 の 終り : 世 の 終り の ため の 四章), Tōkyō : Fukutake Shoten, 1990.
- Niji no misaki (虹 の 岬), Tōkyō : Chūō Kōronsha, 1994.
- Koigokoro (恋心), Tōkyō : Sakuhinsha, 1995.
- Dentō no sōzōryoku (伝統 の 創造力), Tōkyō : Iwanami Shoten, 2001.
- Chichi no shozo (Portrait of My Father), Tōkyō : Shinchōsha, 2004.
