= Hakkaisan Ropeway =

Coordinates: 37°7′1.3″N 138°59′7.5″E

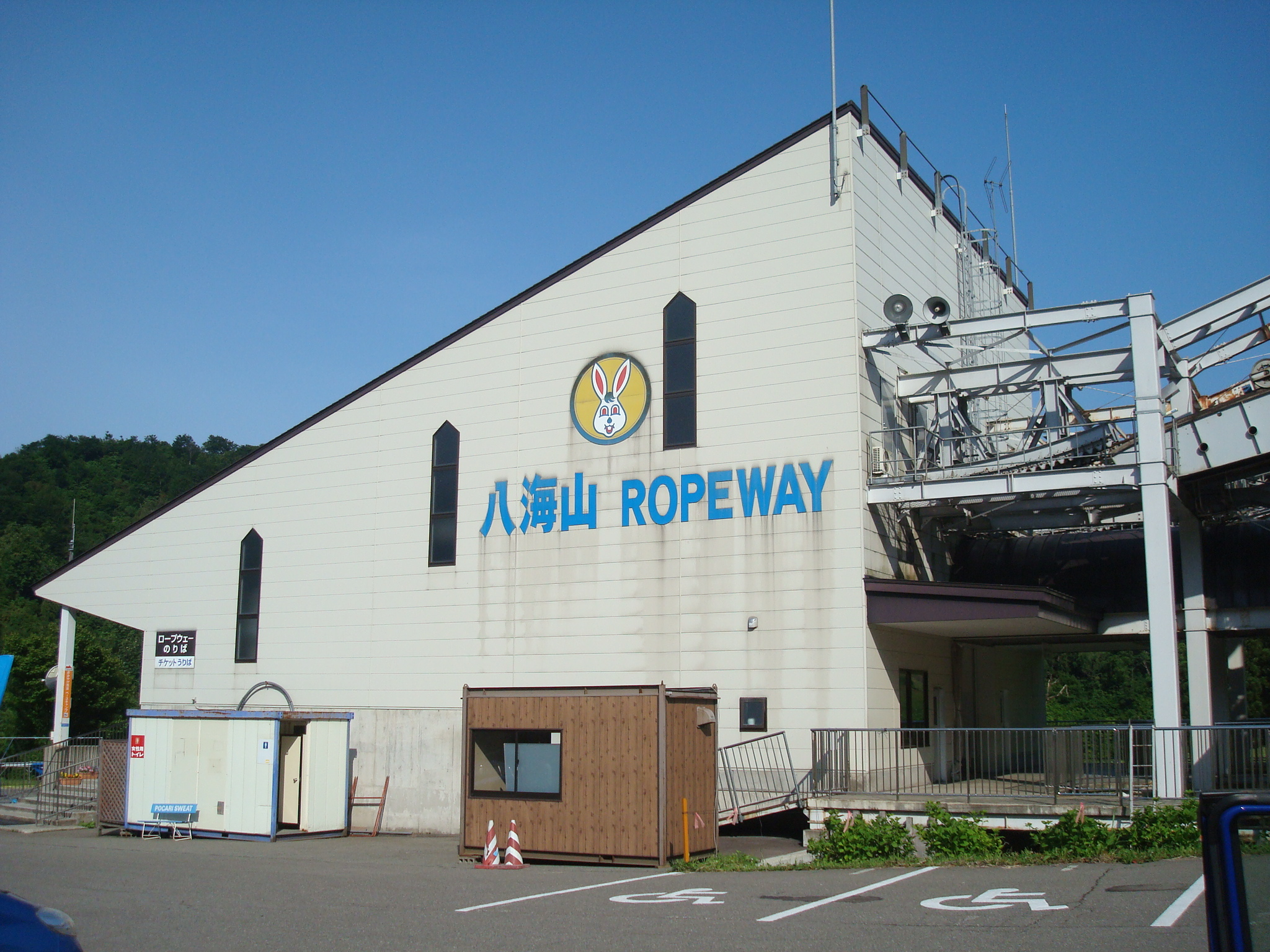
Sanroku Station of the Hakkaisan Ropeway in Minamiuonuma City, Niigata Prefecture.

The Hakkaisan Ropeway (八海山ロープウェイ, Hakkaisan Rōpuwei) is a Japanese aerial lift line in Minamiuonuma, Niigata, operated by Prince Hotels. The line opened in 1983 as a gondola lift line, and refurbished as an aerial tramway in 2001. It climbs Mount Hakkai (八海山) of Muikamachi Hakkaisan Ski Resort (六日町八海山スキー場). The line mainly transports skiers, but also hikers and autumn color spectators in other seasons. The line only operates in "winter" (from December to March) and "summer" (from May to October).

== Basic data ==
- System: Aerial tramway, 2 track cables and 1 haulage rope
- Cable length: 2.2 kilometres (1.4 mi)
- Vertical interval: 771 m (2,530 ft)
- Operational speed: 10.0 m/s
  - The fastest in Japan.
- Passenger capacity per a cabin: 81
- Cabins: 2
- Stations: 2
- Duration of one-way trip: 7 minutes

== See also ==
- List of aerial lifts in Japan
