= Tokyo Garden Terrace Kioicho =

Building in Chiyoda-ku, Tokyo, Japan

Coordinates: 35.6796°N 139.7370°E

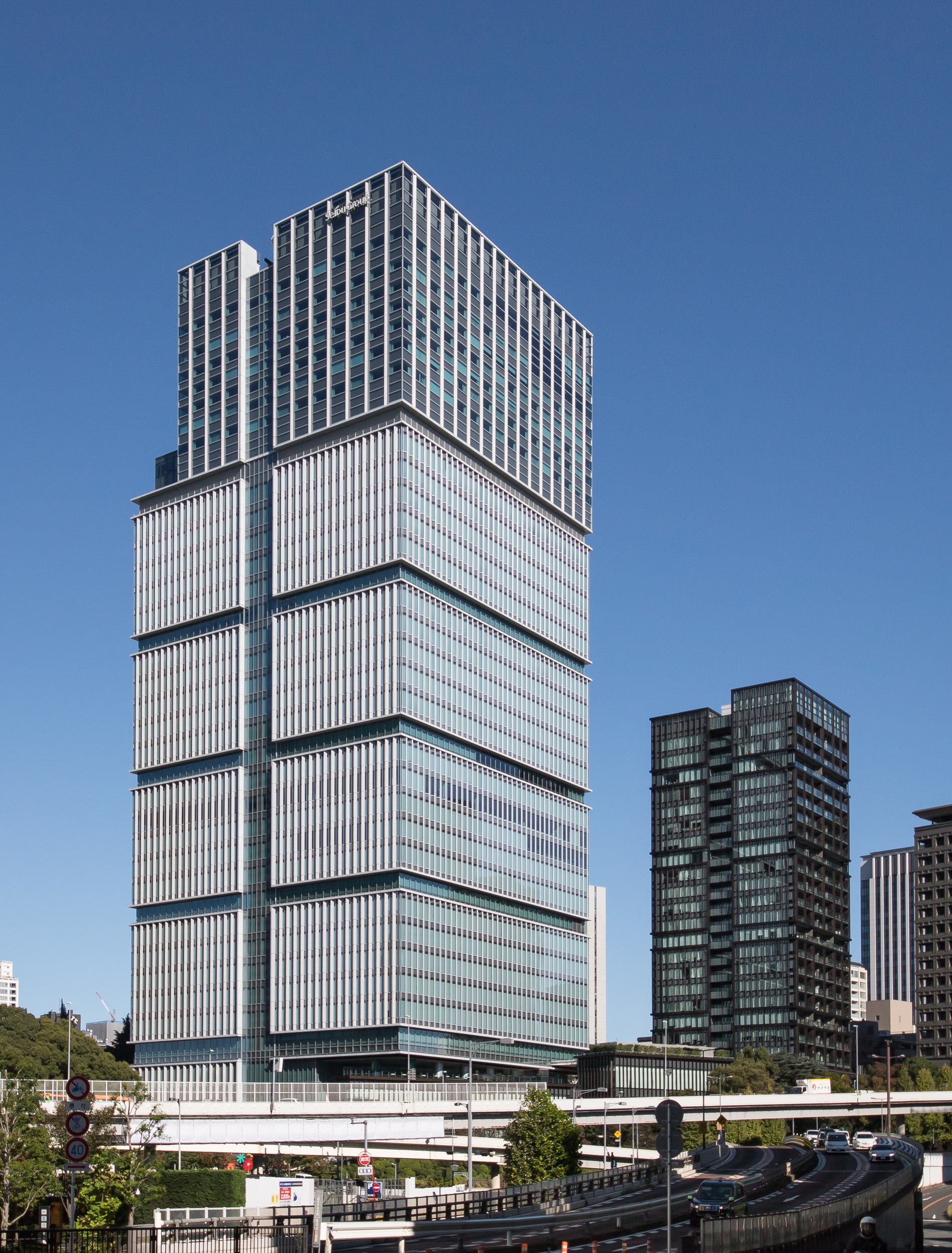
- Tokyo Garden Terrace, June, 2015
- Interactive map of Tokyo Garden Terrace Kioicho
- Location: 1-2 Kioichō, Chiyoda, Tokyo, Japan
- Status: Complete
- Groundbreaking: January 31, 2013
- Constructed: 2013 – 2016
- Estimated completion: July 2016
- Opening: July 27, 2016
- Use: Mixed
- Website: www.tgt-kioicho.jp

Companies
- Architect: Kohn Pedersen Fox
- Developer: Seibu Properties Co. Ltd.
- Owner: Seibu Properties Co., Ltd.

Technical details
- Buildings: 2

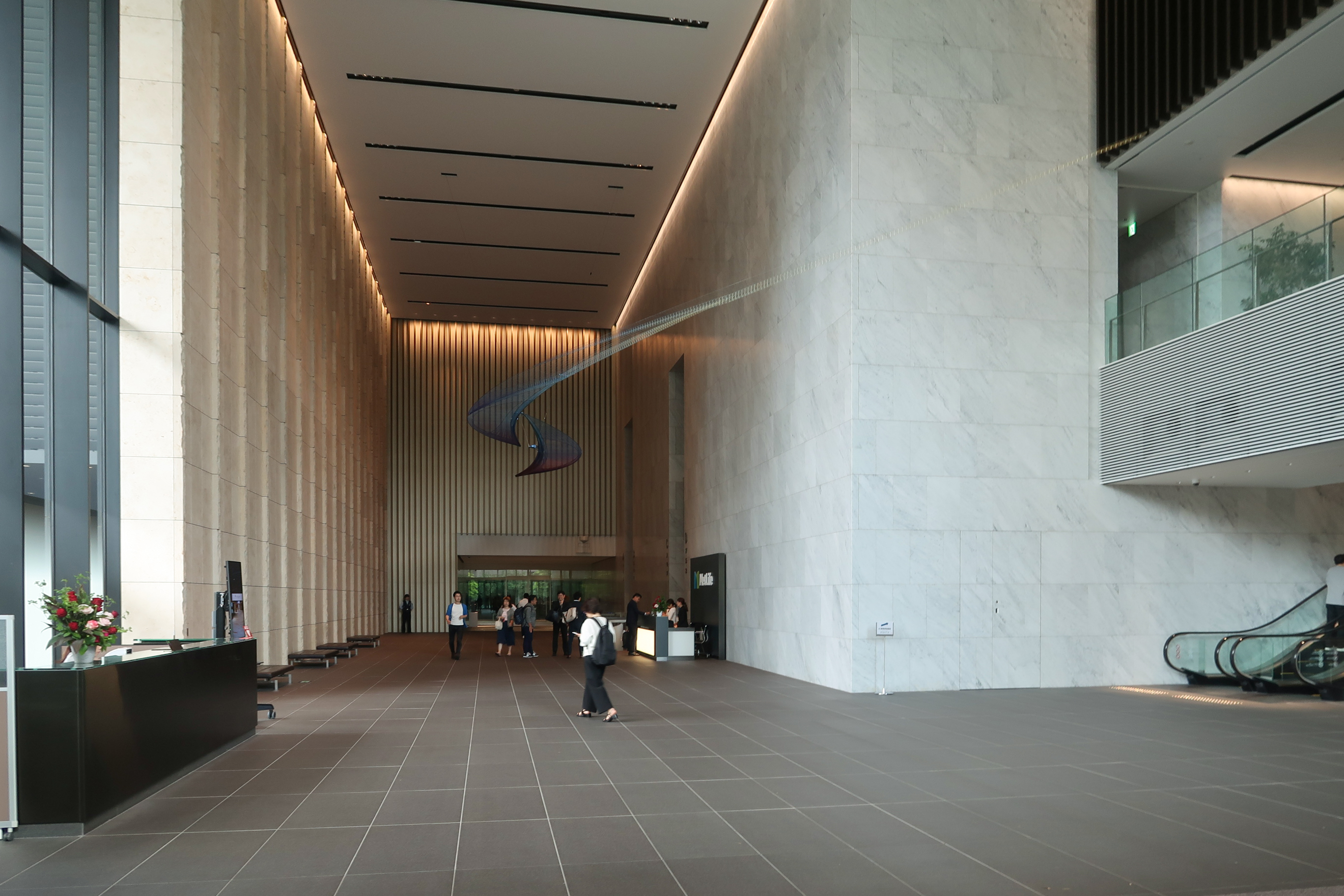
Office Lobby

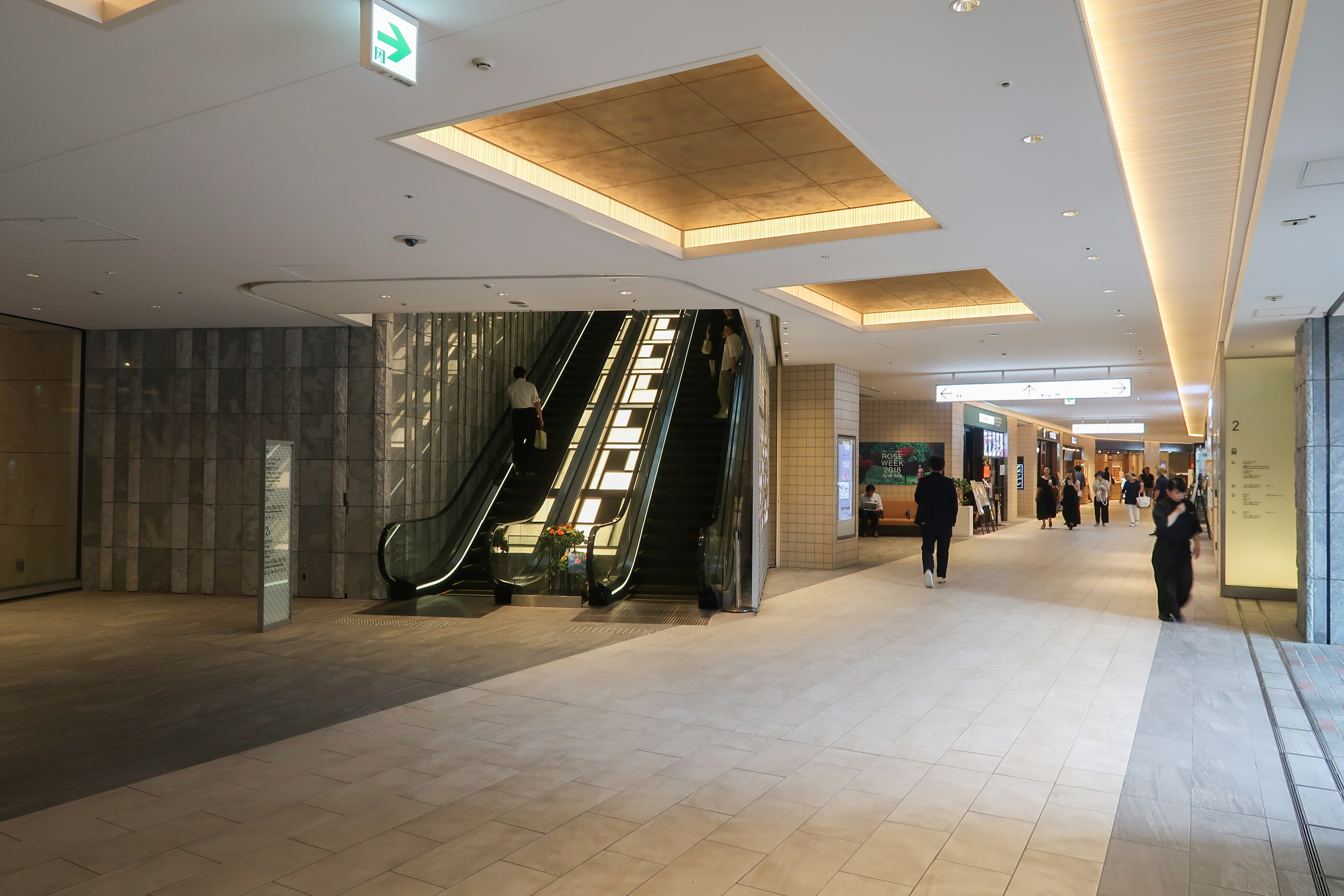
Retail shops in Level 2

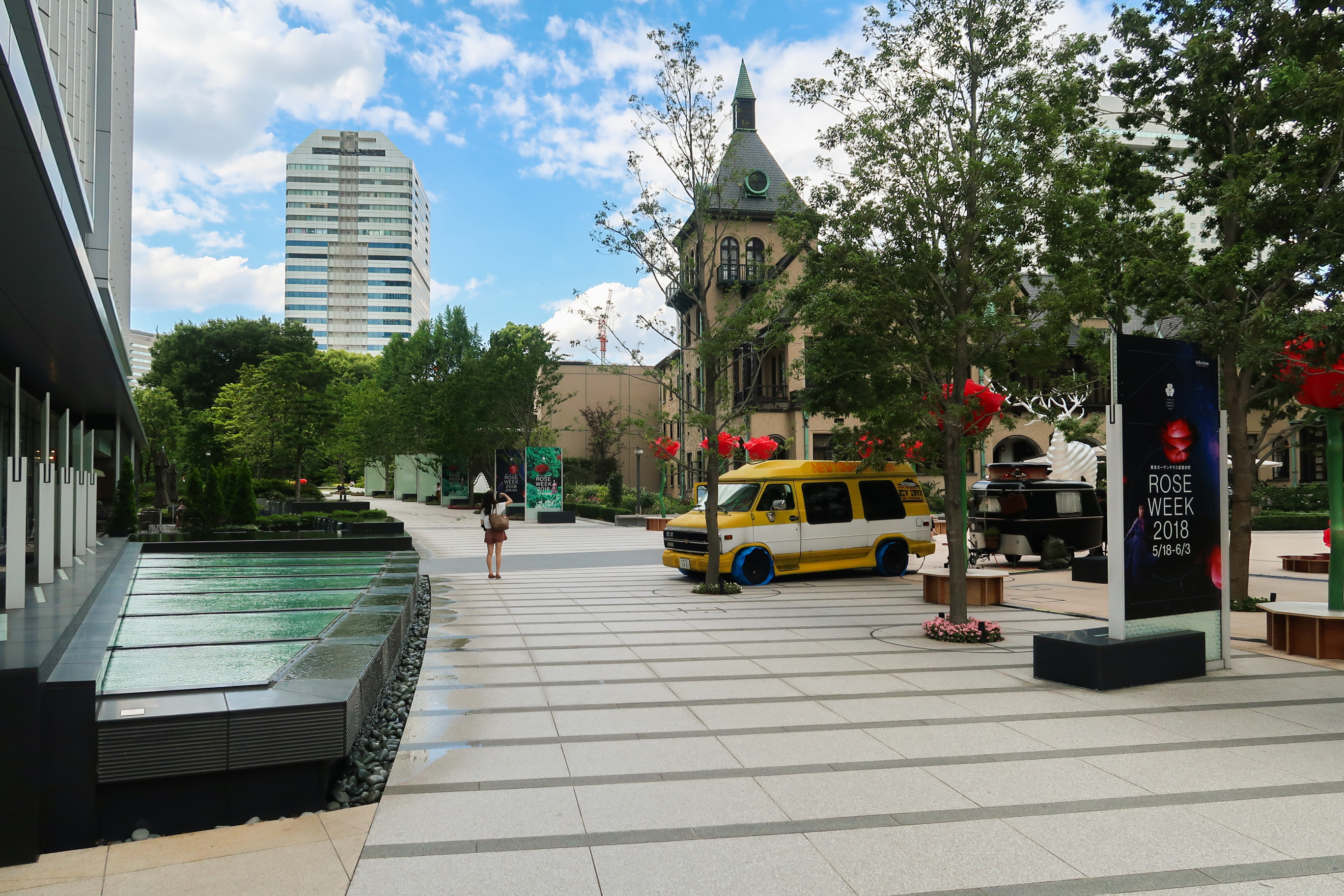
Plaza of Water

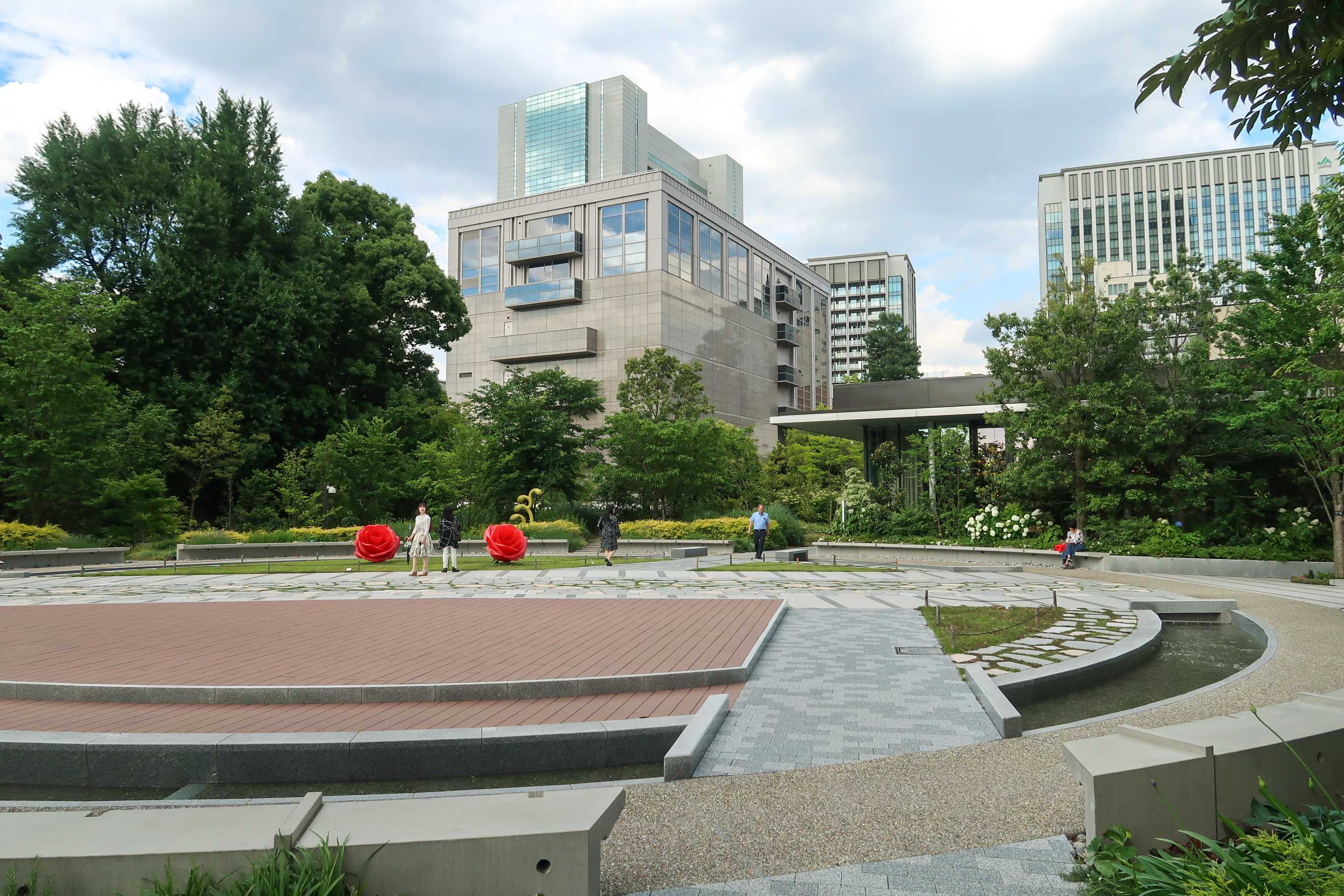
Sprouting Garden

Tokyo Garden Terrace Kioicho (東京ガーデンテラス紀尾井町, Tōkyō Gaaden Terasu Kioichou) is a 227,200-square-meter mixed-use development in Chiyoda, Tokyo, Japan. Completed in 2016, it includes office, residential, commercial, hotel, and leisure space.

Tokyo Garden Terrace takes up 30,400 square meters previously occupied by the Grand Prince Hotel Akasaka, across the moat from Akasaka-mitsuke Station, and adjacent to the Hotel New Otani.

The primary developer is Seibu Properties working in concert with several partners. The project master design was created by architectural firm Kohn Pedersen Fox; Nikken Sekkei is the local architect of record.

In 2024, Blackstone Inc. agreed to buy the property for $2.6 billion from Seibu.

== Site history ==
The former Grand Prince Hotel Akasaka on the site was demolished in 2013. The original hotel structure designed by Kenzo Tange, was scheduled for closure at the end of March 2011, due to outdated building facilities and modifications in Tokyo building codes. In the wake of the 2011 Tōhoku earthquake and tsunami the hotel remained open and served as a temporary housing facility for evacuees from coastal regions of Fukushima Prefecture.

== Buildings ==
=== Office and hotel tower ===
Tokyo Garden Terrace main tower provides 110,000 m^{2} of office space and 28,700 m^{2} of hotel accommodation in a 180m tall, 36-floor high-rise building. The Prince Gallery Kioichō, the hotel component, opened in July 2016. The hotel is located on floors 30 to 36 of the main tower and operated by Seibu Holdings as a franchise of The Luxury Collection.

=== Residential tower ===
A separate residential tower provides 22,700 m^{2} of accommodation in a 90m, 21-floor high-rise tower.

=== Akasaka Prince Classic House ===
The Kitashirakawa Palace has been refurbished as a banquet facility, known as Akasaka Prince Classic House. The historic structure was built in the 1930s as the residence of Yi Un, the last crown prince of Korea.

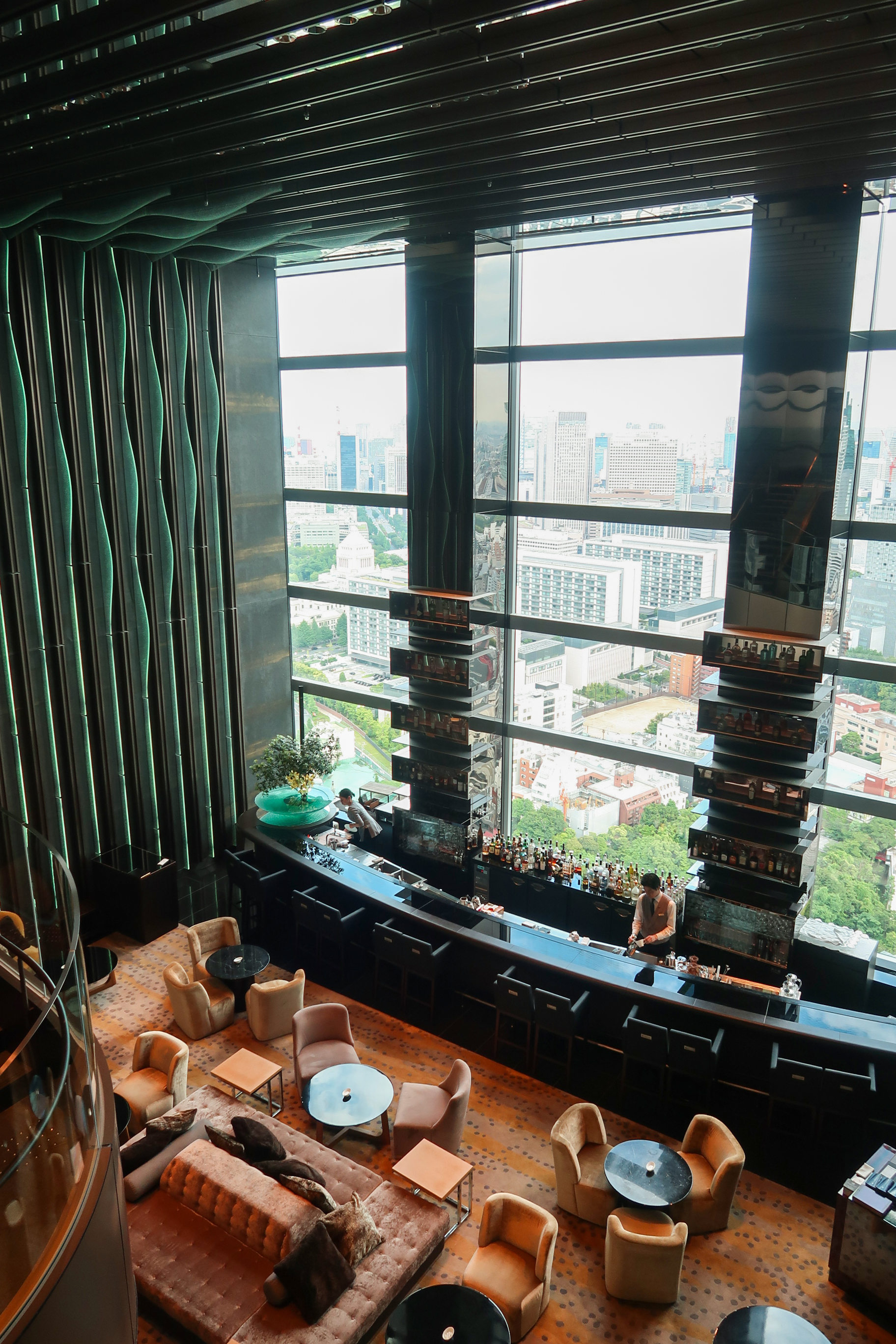
The Prince Gallery Tokyo Kioicho

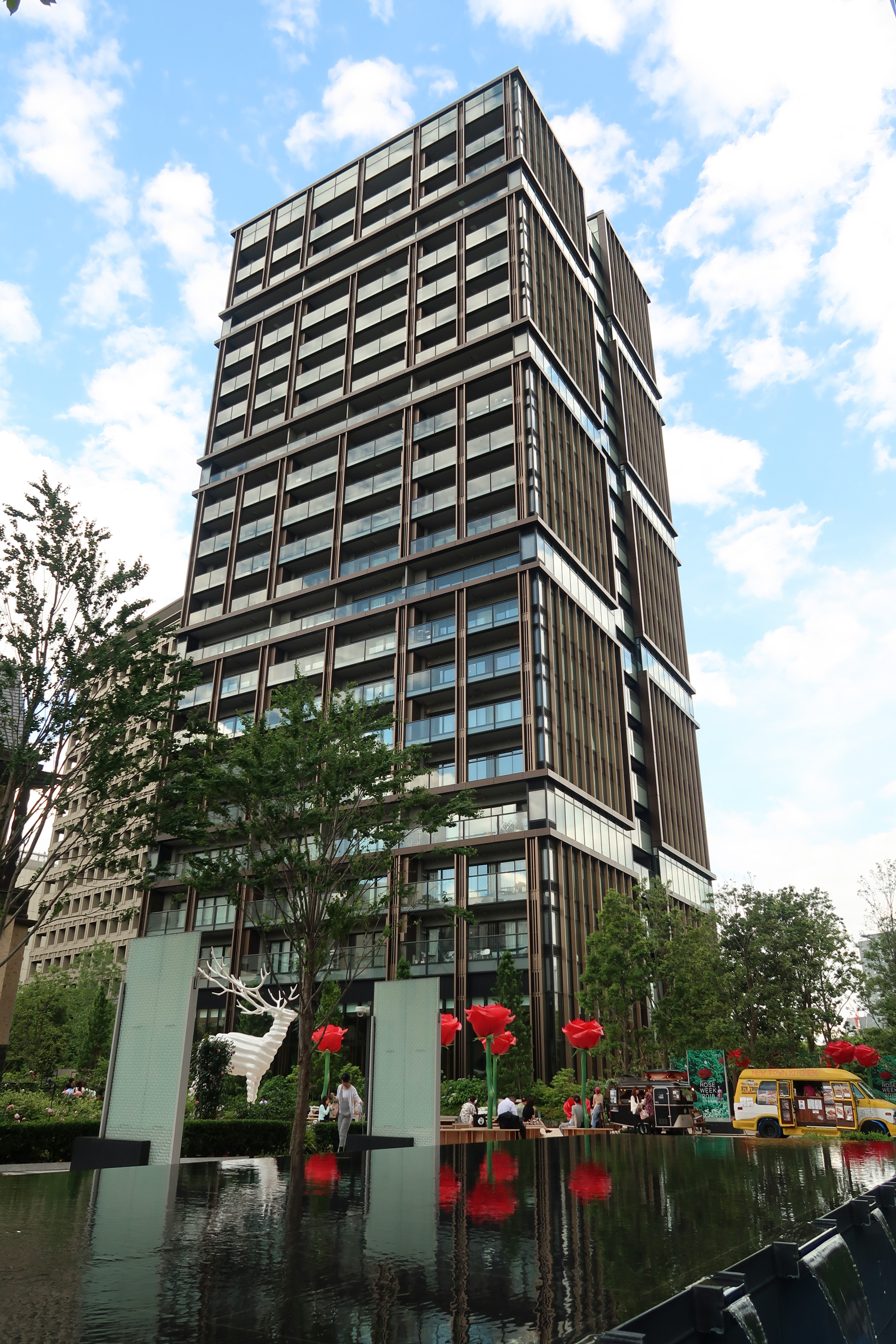
Residential tower

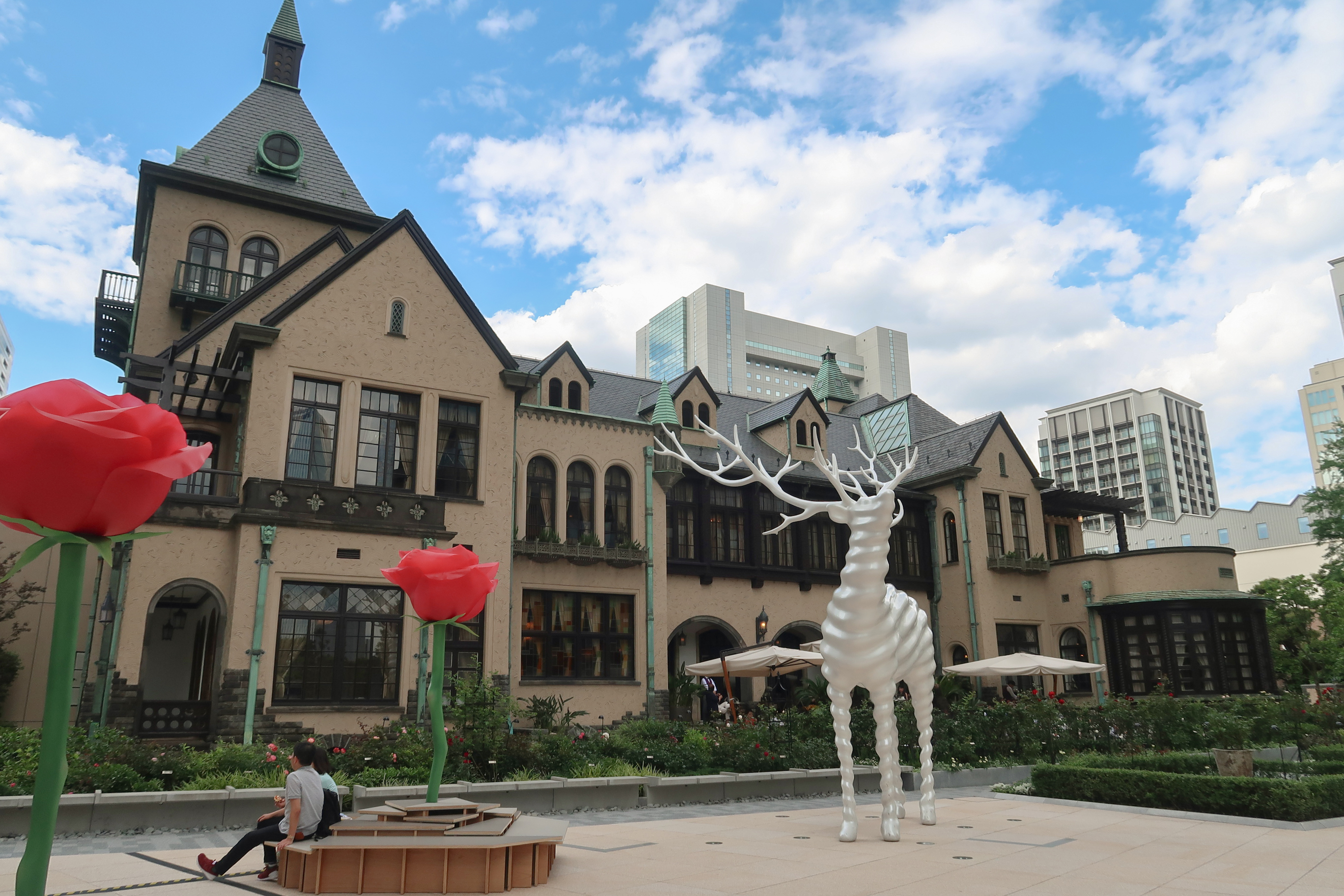
Kitashirakawa Palace

== See also ==
- List of tallest buildings and structures in Tokyo
