= Seibu Holdings =

Japanese comglomerate

Seibu Holdings Inc.

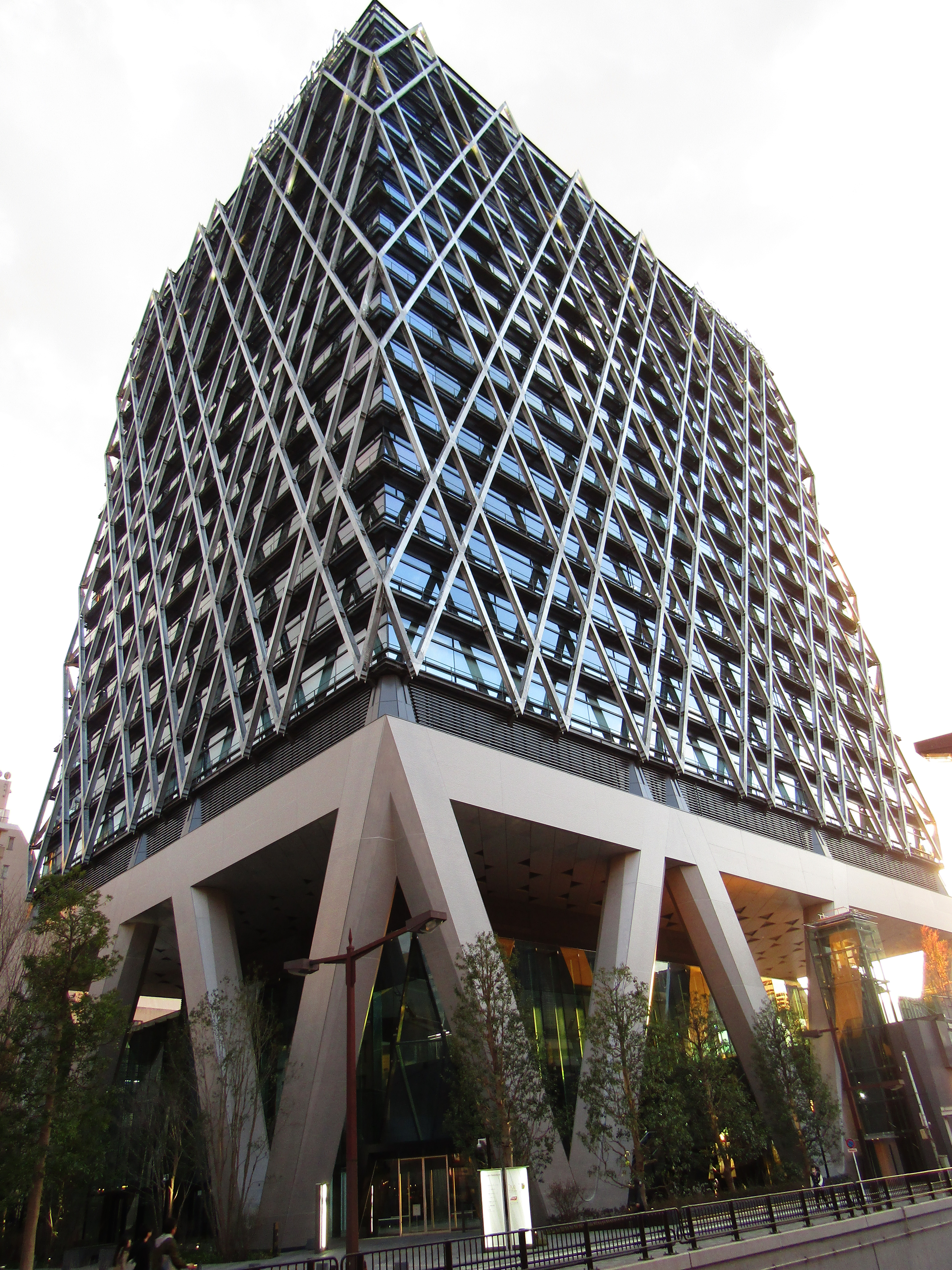
- Headquarters in Toshima, Tokyo
- Native name: 株式会社西武ホールディングス
- Romanized name: Kabushiki-gaisha Seibu Hōrudingusu
- Company type: Public KK
- Traded as: TYO: 9024
- Genre: Holding Company
- Predecessor: Kokudo Corp.
- Founded: February 3, 2006; 20 years ago
- Headquarters: 1-16-15 Minami-Ikebukuro, Toshima, Tokyo, Japan
- Key people: Takashi Gotō
- Net income: ▲¥16.3 billion (FY 2013)
- Owner: NW Corporation (15.83%); Keihin Kyuko Electric Railway (2.83%); Seven and I Holdings (0.33%); Dentsu (0.16%); Keisei Electric Railway (0.08%); Tokyu Corporation (0.04%); Suruga Bank (0.03%)
- Number of employees: 317 (As of March 2014)
- Subsidiaries: Seibu Railway; Prince Hotels
- Website: https://www.seibuholdings.co.jp/

Seibu Holdings Inc. (株式会社西武ホールディングス, Kabushiki-gaisha Seibu Hōrudingusu) is a Japanese multinational holding company that primarily owns Seibu Railway, Prince Hotels, and Seibu Bus and its subsidiaries, which are collectively known as the Seibu Group (西武グループ, Seibu Gurūpu). In total, fifty-three companies across the world are affiliated with the Seibu Group. The company was formed in 2006 to restructure the group after it had come to light in 2004 that the predecessor to Seibu Holdings, Kokudo, had falsified the ownership of its shares in Seibu Railway for over forty years.

As of January 2015, Seibu Holdings' share prices exceed ¥2900 and the company has the highest market capitalization of any Japanese company which owns a private rail network.

== History ==
In 2004, the Seibu Group collapsed due to the revelation that the head of Kokudo (the predecessor of Seibu Holdings), Yoshiaki Tsutsumi, had falsified financial statements for over forty years. The scandal, which involved falsifying the ownership of Kokudo's share holdings in Seibu Railway, was compounded by the increased competition faced by Prince Hotels in the hotel and leisure market as well as an additional pay-off scandal involving a corporate racketeer. Seibu Railway was consequently delisted from the Tokyo Stock Exchange in December 2004 after shares fell to ¥400 from a peak of ¥8000. As a response to this, Seibu Holdings was founded on February 3, 2006, with the aim of restructuring the group following an investment of ¥100 billion from the American private equity firm Cerberus Capital Management. Tsutsumi, having pleaded guilty to the fraud charges in 2005, retained a 5% stake in Seibu Holdings having previously owned a 36% stake in Kokudo.

The company has been directed by Takashi Gotō since its creation in 2006. He is also a company board member for Prince Hotels (since 2006) and Seibu Railway (since 2010).

Despite paying out ¥5.2 billion in compensation as a result of lawsuits concerning the scandals of 2004, the company made a net profit of ¥16.3 billion in fiscal 2013, an increase of 5% when compared to the previous year. In April 2014, Seibu Holdings was listed on the First Section of the Tokyo Stock Exchange where shares had originally been evaluated at ¥2300. After Cerberus abandoned plans to sell a 15.5% stake of the business, however, shares began at the lower offering price of ¥1600 when they were relisted on April 23, 2014. The company ended the day at ¥1770 per share. In total, 27.8 million shares (about 8% of Seibu Holding's outstanding stock) were relisted. It was later revealed that Cerberus had an agreement with their managing underwriter prohibiting them from selling their share in Seibu Holdings until October 2014. The company exceeded its original ¥2300 per share evaluation in June 2014, with its share prices rising to ¥2945 on January 21, 2015.

On January 19, 2015, Seibu Holdings' market capitalization of ¥975 billion overtook that of the Tokyu Corporation. Consequently, Seibu Holdings attained the highest market capitalization of any Japanese company which owns a private rail network.

== Businesses ==
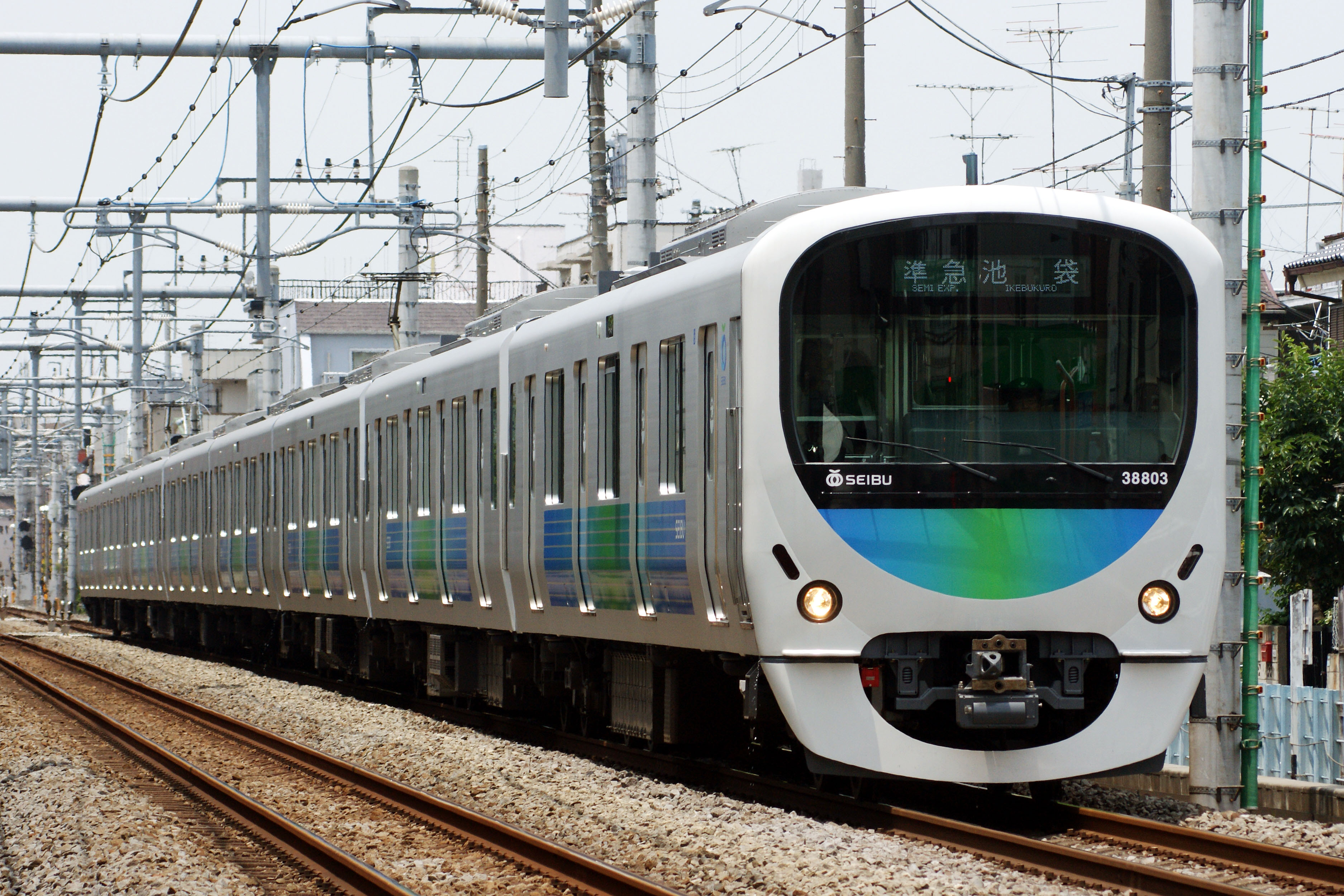
Seibu Railway (rolling stock pictured) is entirely owned by Seibu Holdings.

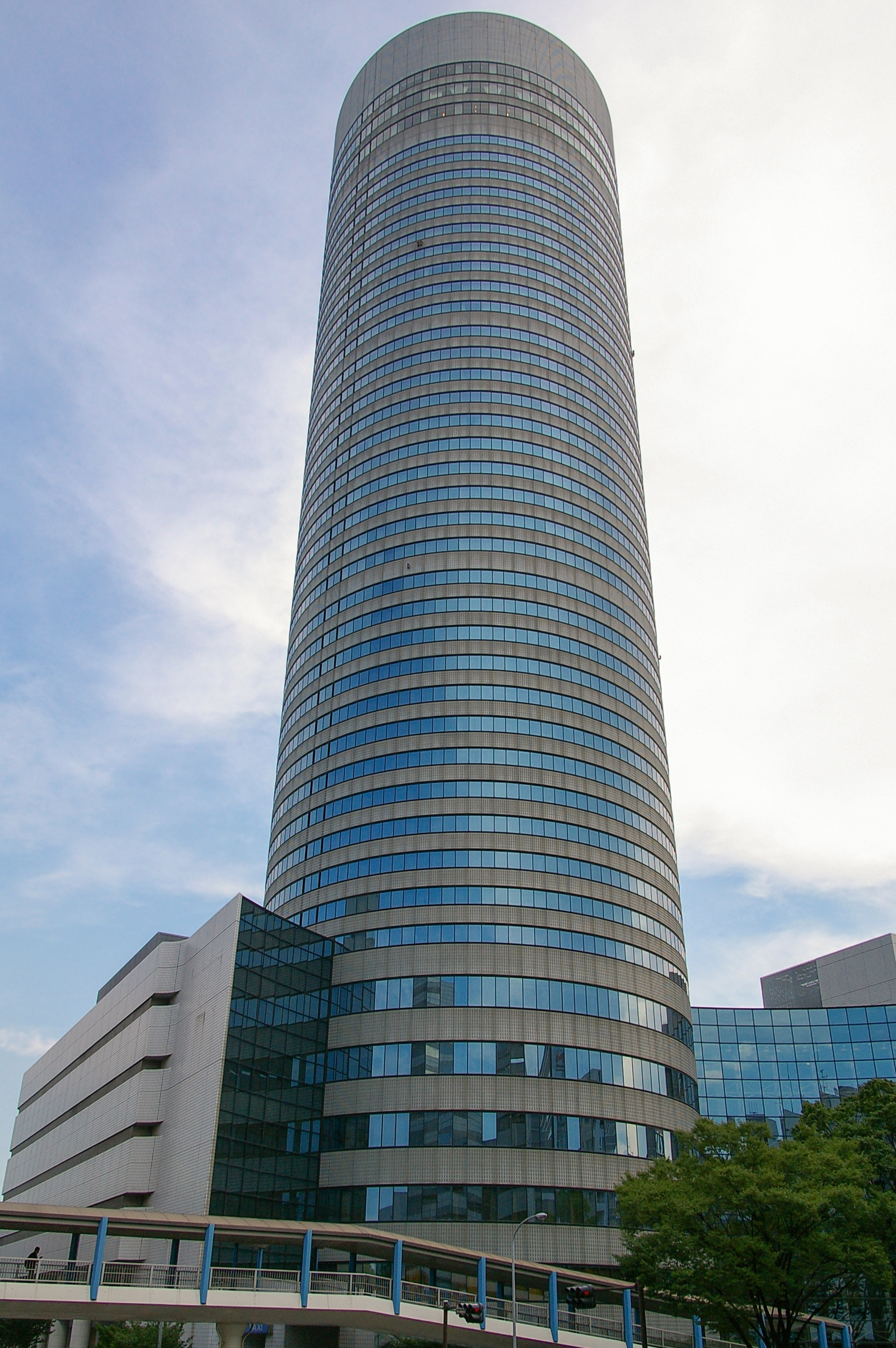
The Shin Yokohama Prince Hotel

Seibu Holdings is a holding company which has ownership over fifty-three companies. The companies that are affiliated with Seibu Holdings are collectively known as the Seibu Group. As of March 2014, it directly employs 371 people.

Seibu Holdings entirely owns Seibu Railway, a major passenger railway company founded in 1912. The company, which employs over 3,700, owns 176.6 kilometers of track and ninety-two stations in western Tokyo and Saitama. Statistics released by the company for fiscal 2013 state that its railway network serves 1.7 million people daily resulting in an annual revenue of ¥140.7 billion.

Prince Hotels logo

The hotel chain Prince Hotels is also owned in its entirety by Seibu Holdings. Formed in 1956, the chain caters largely for the Japanese tourism market with fifty hotels within the country but also has a limited number of overseas resorts in Hawaii, Taiwan and Malaysia. Statistics released by the company state that, at the end of the 2013 fiscal year, there were 6,737 employees and that its capital stock was ¥3.6 billion. Seibu Holdings has announced plans for Prince Hotels offices to be established in Taiwan by October 2014 in order to cater for Taiwanese tourists, with whom the chain has proved most popular in terms of international tourist numbers.

A diverse range of enterprises including: pet care, transportation and real estate are affiliated with Seibu Holdings. Some of Seibu Holdings' subsidiaries have subsidiaries themselves. For example: Seibu Hire, Seibu Kankō Bus, Seibu Sōgōkikaku and Seibu Kōgen Bus are all subsidiaries of Seibu Bus. The table below details the companies affiliated with Seibu Holdings listed in Japanese hiragana order.

Company Name (Japanese)	English Name	Year founded	Overview	References
アドホック株式会社	ADHOC Co., Ltd.	1994	Pet care company operating in Tokyo Metropolitan Area. Employs 82.	
伊豆箱根鉄道株式会社	Izuhakone Railway Co., Ltd.	1916	Passenger rail company serving Shizuoka Prefecture. Employs 444.	
近江鉄道株式会社	Ohmi Railway Co., Ltd.	1896	Passenger rail company serving western Shiga Prefecture.	
サウスコハラウォーターコーポレーション	South Kohala Wastewater Corp.	1995	Wastewater company operating in Hawaii.	
西武観光バス株式会社	Seibu Kankō Bus Co., Ltd.	1988	Tokyo tour bus company with a fleet of eighty-eight vehicles. A subsidiary of Seibu Bus which employs 196.	
西武建材株式会社	Seibu Kenzai Co., Ltd.	1974	A buildings material supplier based in Tokorozawa, Saitama. A subsidiary of Seibu Construction which employs 96.	
西武建設株式会社	Seibu Construction Co., Ltd.	1941	A construction company based in Tokorozawa, Saitama. Employs 695.	
西武高原バス株式会社	Seibu Kōgen Bus Co., Ltd.	1991	Bus company serving Nagano Prefecture focusing on Karuizawa, Nagano. Subsidiary of Seibu Bus.	
西武造園株式会社	Seibu Landscape Co., Ltd.	2000	Landscape gardening agency which specialises in parks.	
株式会社西武SCCAT	Seibu SCCAT Co., Ltd.	1983	Facility management company based in Saitama prefecture. Company name is an acronym for "Safety, Care, Comfort, ATmosphere". Founded as Seibu Sōgōkikaku Co., Ltd., the current name was adopted in 2012 when the present Seibu Sōgōkikaku Co., Ltd. split from Seibu SCCAT. Employs 895.	
株式会社西武総合企画	Seibu Sōgōkikaku Co., Ltd.	2012	Coach operator based in Saitama prefecture with a fleet of 203 vehicles. A subsidiary of Seibu Bus which split from Seibu SCCAT in 2012. Employs 297.	
西武鉄道株式会社	Seibu Railway Co., Ltd.	1912	Passenger rail company serving western Tokyo Metropolitan Area. Employs 3,673.	
西武電設工業株式会社	Seibu Electrical Construction Co., Ltd.	1997	Electrical construction company based in Tokorozawa, Saitama. Employs 97.	
西武トラベル株式会社	Seibu Travel, Inc.	1970	Japanese travel agency for domestic and international travel.	
西武ハイヤー株式会社	Seibu Hire Co., Ltd.	1967	Taxi hire company based in Saitama. A subsidiary of Seibu Bus which employs 960.	
西武バス株式会社	Seibu Bus Co., Ltd.	1932	Bus company serving Tokyo Metropolitan Area. Employs 1,851.	
株式会社西武プロパティーズ	Seibu Properties Inc.	1974	Real estate company serving Tokyo Metropolitan Area.	
株式会社西武ライオンズ	Seibu Lions	1950	Professional baseball club located in Saitama.	
西武緑化管理株式会社	Seibu Ryokuka Kanri Co., Ltd.	1971	Company based in Kodaira which aims to preserve green spaces in the Tokyo Metropolitan Area.	
株式会社豊島園	Toshimaen Co., Ltd.	1984	Amusement park located in Nerima, Tokyo. Employs 131.	
株式会社プリンスホテル	Prince Hotels, Inc.	1956	Large Japanese hotel chain. Employs 6,737.	
株式会社横浜八景島	Yokohama Hakkeijima Inc.	1993	Amusement park and aquarium located in Kanazawa, Yokohama. Has 163 full-time employees.	
横浜緑地株式会社	Yokohama Yokuchi	1974	Landscape gardening agency based in Yokohama.	
