= Yoshiaki Tsutsumi =

Japanese businessman (born 1934)

- 堤 義明
- Born: May 29, 1934 (age 92)
- Education: Waseda University
- Occupation: Chairman of Seibu Corporation
- Years active: 1964–2004
- Children: 3
- Parents: Ishizaka Tsuneko (mother); Yasujirō Tsutsumi (father)
- Relatives: Seiji Tsutsumi (half-brother)

Yoshiaki Tsutsumi (堤 義明, Tsutsumi Yoshiaki; born May 29, 1934) is a Japanese businessman. During the Japanese economic bubble, Forbes listed Tsutsumi as the wealthiest person in the world during 1987–94 due to his extensive real estate investments through the Seibu Corporation, which he controlled. In 1987, he had a net worth of $20 billion (approximately $47.2 billion in today's value). However, as a result of a series of scandals and his 2005 arrest, his wealth fell to such an extent that he was taken off the Forbes list of billionaires in 2007.

== Early life ==
Tsutsumi was born May 29, 1934, to businessman Yasujirō Tsutsumi and his mistress Ishizaka Tsuneko. He was one of Yasujirō's seven children, and spent his childhood in a Tokyo suburb with Tsuneko and his two younger brothers, Yasuhiro and Yuji. When he was around 7 years old, he met his then-14-year-old half-brother Seiji Tsutsumi; the two were said to have an immediate disdain for each other.

Tsutsumi was said to have inherited his father's personality; he claimed to have begun assisting his father's business in elementary school, beginning with simple tasks like holding blueprints. Though his father subjected him to physical discipline, Tsutsumi was said to be his favorite—something that gained him significant corporate and political influence.

Tsutsumi graduated from Waseda University in 1957.

== Business and sports career ==
Tsutsumi made his earliest forays into business as a university student: in 1956, he opened the Karuizawa Skate Center in Nagano. Upon graduating in 1957, he was employed by Kokudo Keikaku Kogyo (later Kokudo Corporation), of which his father was the chairman.

In April 1964, Tsutsumi's father Yasujirō died. Despite the disagreement of his widow Masao, the thirty-year-old Yoshiaki Tsutsumi inherited control of the Seibu Corporation. Most observers had expected the designated successor to be his elder half-brother Seiji Tsutsumi, who instead inherited the Seibu department stores. Though Seiji subsequently parlayed these stores into the Credit Saison empire, the perceived rivalry between the two brothers' fiefdoms provided fodder for the popular press.

As chairman, Tsutsumi focused on developing and expanding the vast land holdings inherited from his father. At one point, his companies were believed to own one-sixth of all the land in Japan.

A significant portion of Tsutsumi's business ventures went towards sports: he served as chairman of the Japan Ice Hockey Federation and owned the Seibu Tetsudo hockey club, later known as the Seibu Prince Rabbits. Though he reportedly did not have much knowledge of baseball, 1979 saw his purchase of the Seibu Lions baseball team and the construction of a new stadium in the greater Tokyo area. Despite him being more knowledgeable about ice hockey, he saw the value baseball could bring to the Seibu Corporation, especially with how baseball was far more popular than ice hockey in Japan. He later served as the first chairman of the Japan Olympic Committee, resigning in 1990, after less than a year. Despite his resignation, he continued to exert significant control over the committee by selecting future chairmen, which effectively prevented his opponents from serving in the position.

Tsutsumi's total net worth has been unclear, as it is unknown how much he owned in assets: he almost always refused interviews, and did not permit Seibu spokespeople to reveal company information.

=== 1998 Winter Olympics ===
When Nagano bid to host the 1998 Winter Olympics, Tsutsumi—then head of the Japan Olympic Committee—used his financial and political influence, as well as a connection to the International Olympic Committee president, to give Nagano an edge on the bid. He continued to work with them even after stepping down from the committee, and has been cited by former Japan Olympic Committee members as the reason for Nagano's successful bid.

The decision to host the Winter Olympics in Nagano was heavily criticized by environmentalist groups, noting that the construction of the ski runs necessitated the removal of forestry, and the ski runs themselves infringed upon protected land. Also criticized was the financial conflict of interest: many of the businesses in the region were owned by Seibu.

=== Honors ===
For contributions to international ice hockey, Tsutsumi was inducted into the builder category of the International Ice Hockey Federation Hall of Fame in 1999.

== Suspicions of insider trading and arrest ==
The January 17, 2005 edition of The Wall Street Journal made an investigation on Tsutsumi and the Seibu Corporation public to English readers. According to the paper, the Seibu corporation's headquarters were raided by police, who allegedly found evidence of several Japanese business law-breaking incidents. The police, for example, claimed that the company declared that their major shareholders accounted only for 64 percent of the company's shareholders, but that, in reality, the major shareholders at Seibu actually owned 88 percent of the company's shares. Such bogus ownership statement is suspected to be illegal falsification. Major shareholders can only get up to 80 percent of a Japanese company's stock to be listed on the Tokyo Stock Exchange. That scandal was originally opened in 2002 in Japan, after which Tsutsumi was ordered by a court out of the company, but he remained in it, although at a much less paid employment.

While multiple Seibu employees were involved in the scandal, Tsutsumi was considered the ringleader, as a result of position in the company and his authoritarian management style.

On March 3, 2005, Tsutsumi was arrested on suspicion of violation of securities trading law. Tsutsumi pleaded guilty, and on October 27, 2005, the Tokyo District Court sentenced him to 30 months in prison, suspended for 4 years, and a fine of 5 million yen. His suspended sentence expired in October 2009 and he remains indirectly a major shareholder in Seibu Holdings.

Seibu Corporation later sought legal action against Tsutsumi. The parties reached a settlement in 2016, with Seibu receiving ¥25.6 billion ($223 million).
