= Yasujirō Tsutsumi =

Japanese politician

The Honourable Yasujirō Tsutsumi
- 堤 康次郎
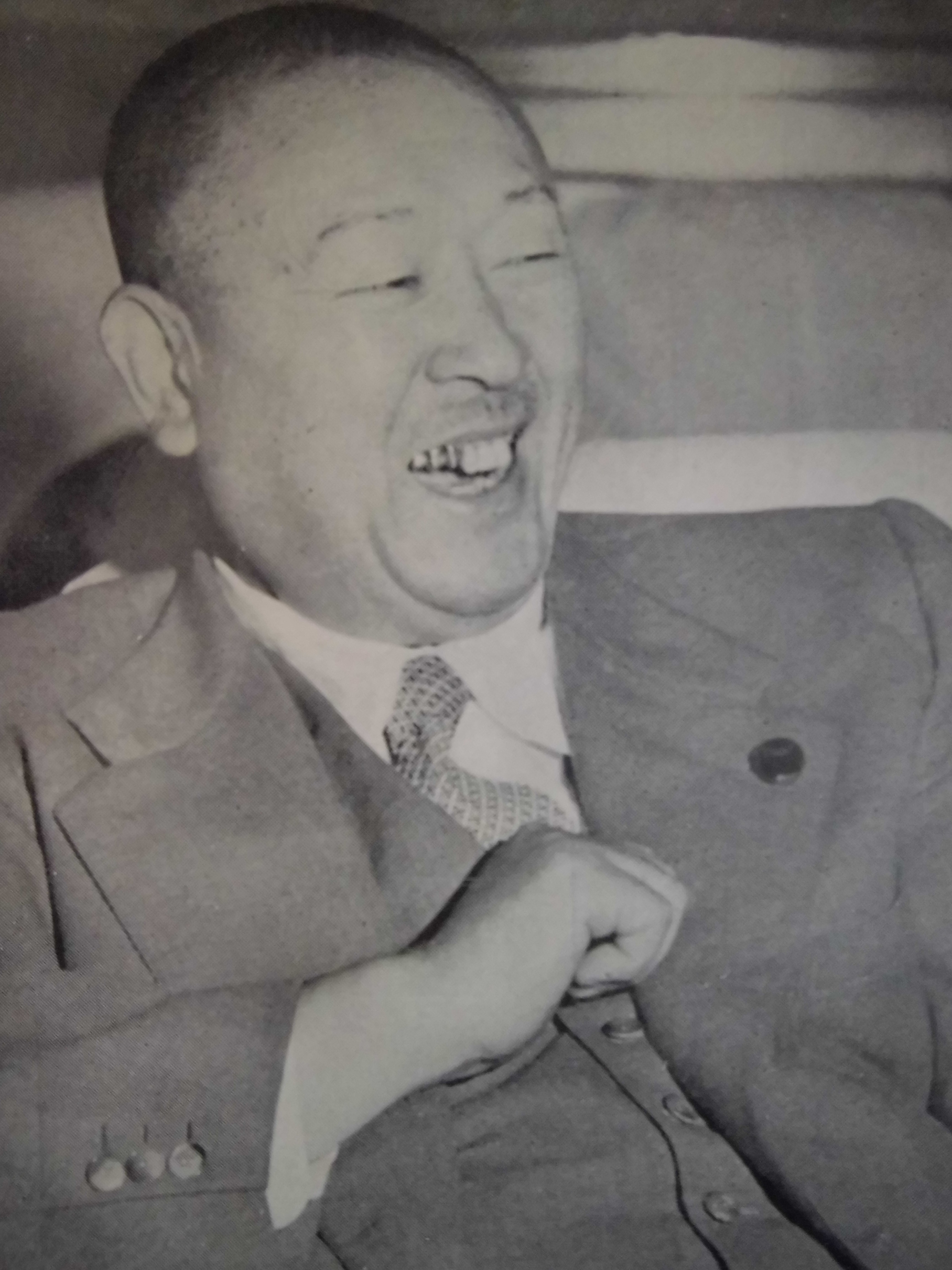
- Tsutsumi in 1955

Speaker of the House of Representatives
- In office 18 May 1953 – 10 December 1954
- Monarch: Hirohito
- Deputy: Hyō Hara
- Preceded by: Banboku Ōno
- Succeeded by: Tō Matsunaga

Member of the House of Representatives
- In office 2 October 1952 – 26 April 1964
- Preceded by: Isaburō Kawara
- Succeeded by: Ganri Yamashita
- Constituency: Shiga at-large
- In office 11 May 1924 – 18 December 1945
- Preceded by: Iryou Nishimura
- Succeeded by: Constituency abolished
- Constituency: Shiga 5th (1924–1928); Shiga Prefecture (1928–1945)

Personal details
- Born: 27 March 1889 Aishō, Shiga, Japan
- Died: 26 April 1964 (aged 75) Chiyoda, Tokyo, Japan
- Party: Liberal Democratic (1955–1964)
- Other political affiliations: Independent (1924–1927; 1945–1952; 1954–1955); CDP (1927–1940); IRAA (1940–1945); Kaishintō (1952–1954)
- Education: Waseda University

Yasujirō Tsutsumi (堤 康次郎, Tsutsumi Yasujirō; 7 March 1889 − 26 April 1964) was a Japanese entrepreneur, politician, and business tycoon who founded a dynasty which became the wealthiest, most influential family of 20th century Japan. Tsutsumi served as the Speaker of the House of Representatives of Japan from May 1953 to December 1954, resigning at the end of the government of Shigeru Yoshida.

== Early life ==
Yasujirō Tsutsumi was born on 16 March 1889 in the rural farming village of Yagisho, Shiga Prefecture. The Tsutsumi family were held in great respect and regard, serving as village elders and headmen. However, little is known about their antecedents or origins, and there is no evidence that the traditional extended family unit ever existed in their case. Yasujirō's father, Yujiro, died of typhoid fever in 1893, when Yasujirō was four, also leaving his wife, Miwo, and a daughter, Fusako, who had been born in 1891. Following his father's premature death, Yasujirō's mother left to return to her family, never to be heard from again, an event that haunted Yasujirō to the end of his days. After his mother's separation, both Yasujirō and his sister were raised by their paternal grandfather Kiyozaemon, a stern traditionalist who wished Yasujirō to take over the family lands and remain a farmer. However, Yasujirō had no such intentions. Since the Meiji Restoration, tremendous change had swept Japan, which was seeing a period of remarkable expansion and industrialisation. Though eager to be a part of this new era, he had little choice but to bide his time for the moment when he could break free.

== Career ==
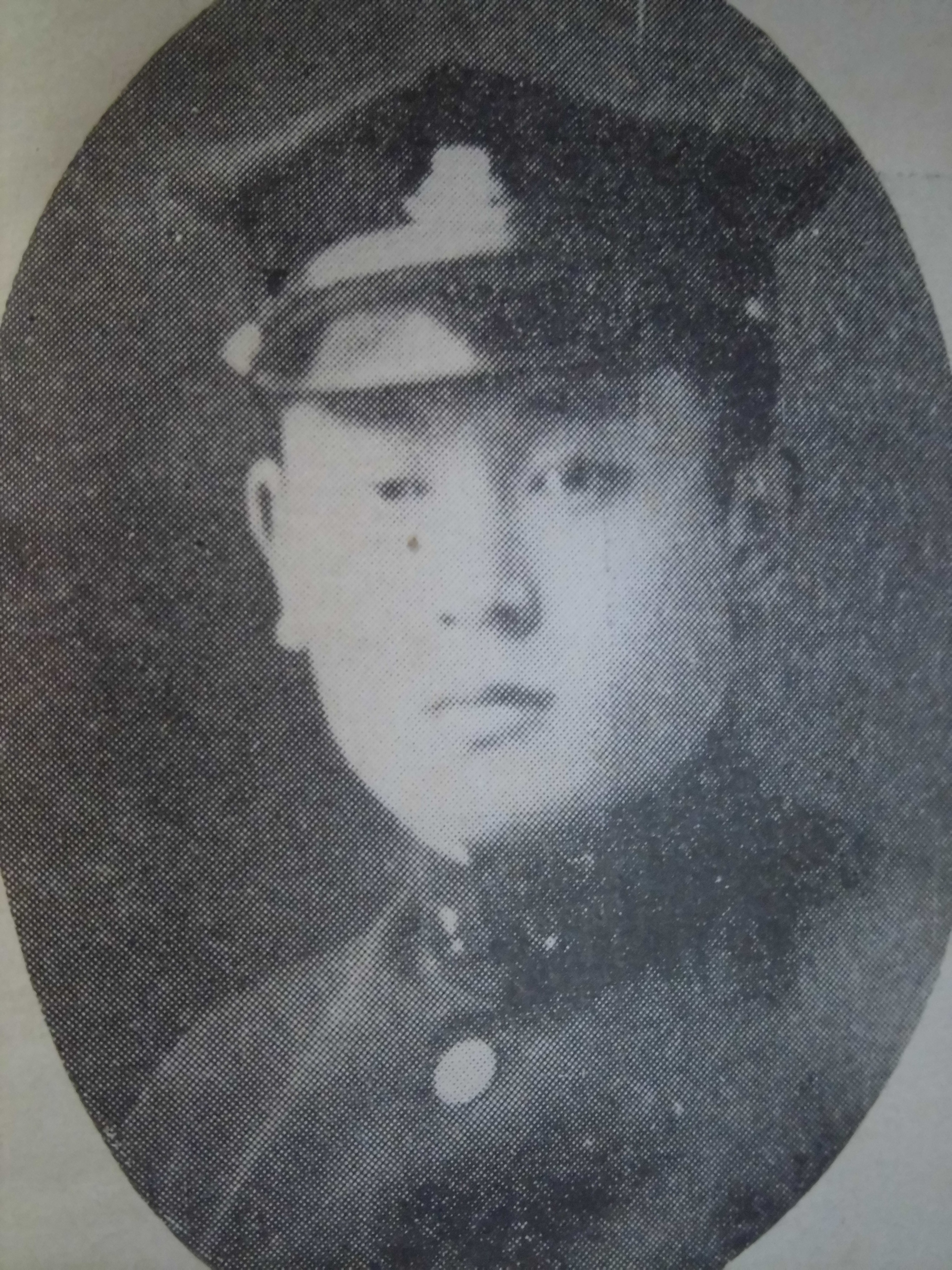
Tsutsumi whilst studying at Waseda University.

Kiyozaemon died in 1907, creating the opportunity for Yasujirō to break free. In 1909, he mortgaged the family estate for 5000 yen. With this money, he married Nishizawa Koto and had a daughter, Shukuko, in 1909, then attended Waseda University investing in rough land and businesses. At the time, however, rough land had little value and was looked upon as a foolish investment. Still, Yasujirō persisted. In 1917, he purchased 650 acres (2.6 km^{2}) of land for 30,000 yen from a village near the fashionable mountain resort of Karuizawa, and built several vacation houses and cottages. With this, he established a company, Hakone Resorts Ltd. Japan had prospered greatly during the First World War, initiating a period of prosperity and democracy the likes of which Japan had never experienced before. Yasujirō's wealth and empire expanded proportionally with this boom. Customers came, and by 1923, Hakone Resorts Ltd had a value of 20,000,000 yen.

On 1 September 1923, the Great Kantō earthquake convulsed Japan and destroyed most of Tokyo. Yasujirō's properties escaped damage, and his empire continued to spread. Around this time, Yasujirō was called upon to handle the financial affairs of one Aoyama Yoshizo, a gentleman of a patrician noble family who had gone bankrupt. Aoyama had four daughters, all extremely beautiful, and Yasujirō fell in love with them at once. He had forceful affairs with the second and youngest daughters; from those affairs, a son, Seiji Tsutsumi, was born in 1927 by the second daughter, and a daughter, Kuniko, was born by the youngest daughter in 1928. However, it was the third daughter, Misao, whom he coveted, and yet, she refused all his advances until finally, in order to preserve the family honour, she yielded to Yasujirō as a mistress.

For Aoyama, however, the damage was complete. Traumatised, he committed suicide. Yet, Yasujirō had at last found a strong woman to match himself. Misao adopted Seiji and Kuniko as her own. In the meanwhile, Yasujirō had entered politics; in 1924, he had been elected as a member of the Diet, soon becoming parliamentary vice-minister. He soon turned his attention away from Misao and sought other mistresses, especially one Ishizuka Tsuneko, the daughter of a close friend, with whom he had three sons. The first, Yoshiaki Tsutsumi, born in 1934, was destined to play a significant role later on.

=== War years (1937–1945) ===
By the mid-1930s the Great Depression had set in, and militarists and nationalists were in control of the government. Yasujirō expanded his interests to railways and tramlines, eventually absorbing his competitors into Hakone Resorts Ltd. Among the competitors was a rail company called Seibu, whose name Yasujirō eventually took for his concern, eventually changing the name of Hakone Resorts Ltd. to Seibu. In the late thirties, he built an imposing mansion for himself and his family, which eventually became the official state house, and cultivated relationships with Japan's elite, among them General and Prime Minister Tojo.

In 1940, he took over a small department store in Ikebukuro; at the time, he thought little of it. Then came the war. During the war, Yasujirō's relationships with his family grew strained: Kiyoshi, as the chonan or eldest son, would likely succeed Yasujirō; however, he had never enjoyed the atmosphere in which he was forced to live in, and expressed his displeasure by refusing to submit to his father. In 1943, he was married to a girl of patrician background. Yasujirō sent Fumi and Tsuneko to the country to escape the war, remaining in Tokyo with Misao and her children. He engaged in a variety of projects to aid the war effort, including a creative way of sewage disposal. Though the escalation of the war caused great hardship for most, the Tsutsumis always had enough food and shelter. By 1945, the war was in its last stages. Firebombing destroyed the family mansion, forcing the family to move to a small side house. Finally, on 15 August, the Japanese government capitulated.

== Post-war (1945–1953) ==
Shortly after the surrender, Yasujirō was purged by the Occupation Government under American General Douglas MacArthur. In the meantime, Japan was in chaos. People flooded into Tokyo from the countryside. Communists thrived in the poverty-stricken Japan, delivering tirades against the wealthy and powerful. By this time, Kiyoshi's relationships with his father were at their lowest ebb. In 1946, following several loud arguments, he was disinherited. Despite this tumult, opportunity soon came for Yasujirō. In 1947, MacArthur passed the Imperial Household Law. Among its provisions was that all members of the imperial family not directly connected to the emperor would become commoners and leave the family. Though they received generous settlements, each prince was also burdened with a crippling tax. Yasujirō stepped in, and through several complex manoeuvrers lasting until 1953, bought much of the land of Prince Kitashirakawa and Prince Asaka along with Asaka's palace. Those prime properties later became the jewels in the crown of the Seibu business empire.

== Statesman (1953–1963) ==
In May 1953, Yasujirō was elected Speaker of the House of Representatives of Japan, and he assigned Hiroji Yamamoto and Seiji to become his secretary. At 64, he had reached the pinnacle of his long career. He remained Speaker until 1954, when he resigned following the end of the Shigeru Yoshida government. Later that same year, he formally divorced Fumi and married Misao in a private ceremony. In 1955, he assigned his heir presumptive, Seiji, to take over the department store in Ikebukuro, which had been failing for a time; under Seiji's leadership, it was transformed into one of the biggest in Tokyo. Meanwhile, Yoshiaki, Yasujirō's son by Tsuneko, took charge of the core group of Seibu, Kokudo Keikaku. Yasujirō then settled down to the quiet life of a distinguished former politician, traveling the world in 1961 and meeting with world leaders. Apart from a scandal involving bribery in 1963, his last years were comparatively peaceful.

== Death ==
Yasujirō suffered a case of cerebral anemia on 23 April 1964, and died peacefully at home on 26 April 1964, of a cerebral hemorrhage at the age of 75. He was cremated and his ashes buried in a grand tomb at Kamakura.

Following his death, the empire was formally divided between Seiji and his younger half-brother Yoshiaki; Seiji receiving the retail portion and Yoshiaki taking the commercial portion. Just prior to his death, Yasujirō had chosen Yoshiaki as his heir, possibly because Seiji had been briefly involved with the Japanese Communist Party after the war and as such was not completely trustworthy in Yasujirō's eyes.

== Family and descendants ==
Yasujirō was notorious for his sexual appetite. In all, he had three wives and two mistresses by which he had seven acknowledged children, three of whom were legitimate. By all accounts, however, he had many more unacknowledged children by other mistresses and prostitutes, estimates of the number ranging from 50-100.

=== Yasujirō Tsutsumi (1889-1964) ===
- M I. Nishizawa Koto (1887-?), in 1909, divorced 1915, by which he had a daughter, Shukuko (1909-fl 1994), who married Kojima Shojiro (190?-1972) and had two sons, Yasuo and Tadashi.
- 1 (affair) with a postal clerk, Iwasaki Sono, in 1913, by which he had a son, Kiyoshi (1914-fl 1994), who married, no issue.
- M II. Kawasaki Fumi (1887-?), in 1915, divorced 1954; no issue
- 2 (affair) with second daughter (d. 1984?) of Aoyama Yoshizo, a client, by which he had a son:
  - Seiji Tsutsumi (1927-2013), who married: (1) Yamaguchi Motoko, by whom he had a son, Koji (1958-); divorced and married (2) Asako (1938-), by whom he had a son, Takao (1970-)
- 3 (affair) with fourth and youngest daughter of Aoyama Yoshizo, a client, by which he had a daughter:
  - Kuniko (1928-), who married: (1)Morita Juro, by which she had three sons, Goro, Shigeto, and Nanashige. Divorced and married (2) unknown Frenchman; no issue.
- M III. Aoyama Misao (1908–1984), third daughter of Aoyama Yoshizo, a client. Adopted both Seiji and Kuniko, her niece and nephew, as her own children; mistress of Yasujirō from 1928–1954, then married Yasujirō in July 1954.
- 4 (affair) with Ishizuka Tsuneko (1913–1984), daughter of a close friend, by which he had three sons:
  - Yoshiaki Tsutsumi (1934-), married Ishibashi Yuri (1944-), by which he had two sons and a daughter, Masatoshi (1970-), Chika (1973-), and Hirotoshi (1975-)
  - Yasuhiro (1938-)
  - Yuji (1942-)

== Sources ==
- The Brothers; the hidden world of Japan's richest family. Downer, Leslie, Random House, 1994 ISBN 0-679-42554-3
