= Dragondola =

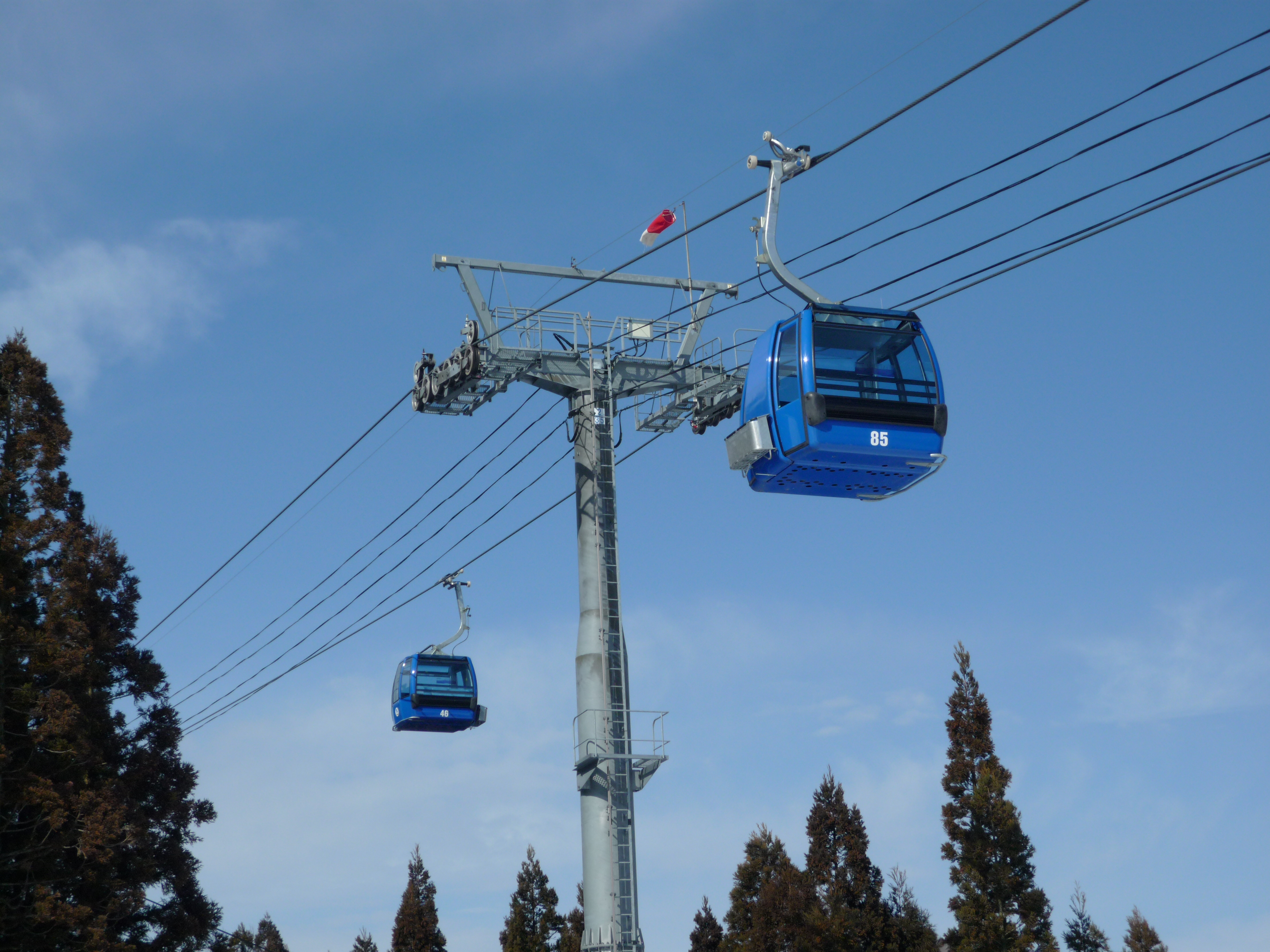
Dragondola

The Dragondola (ドラゴンドラ, Doragondora), officially the Naeba-Tashiro Gondola (苗場・田代ゴンドラ, Naeba-Tashiro Gondora) is the Japanese aerial lift line in Naeba, Yuzawa, Niigata, operated by Prince Hotels. It opened in 2001. The line was named by Yumi Matsutōya, a popular pop singer. The line links two ski resorts of Prince Hotels, but the line operates in summer and autumn as well. Its official website states it is the longest gondola lift line in the world.

== Basic data ==
- Distance: 5.5 kilometres (3.4 mi)
- Vertical interval: 426 m (1,398 ft)
- Operational speed: 6 m/s
- System: Gondola lift
- Cabins: 107
- Passenger capacity per a cabin: 8
- Time required for single ride: 15 minutes

== See also ==
- List of aerial lifts in Japan
