= Shin Yokohama Prince Hotel =

Hotel in Kohoku-ku, Yokohama, Kanagawa Prefecture, Japan

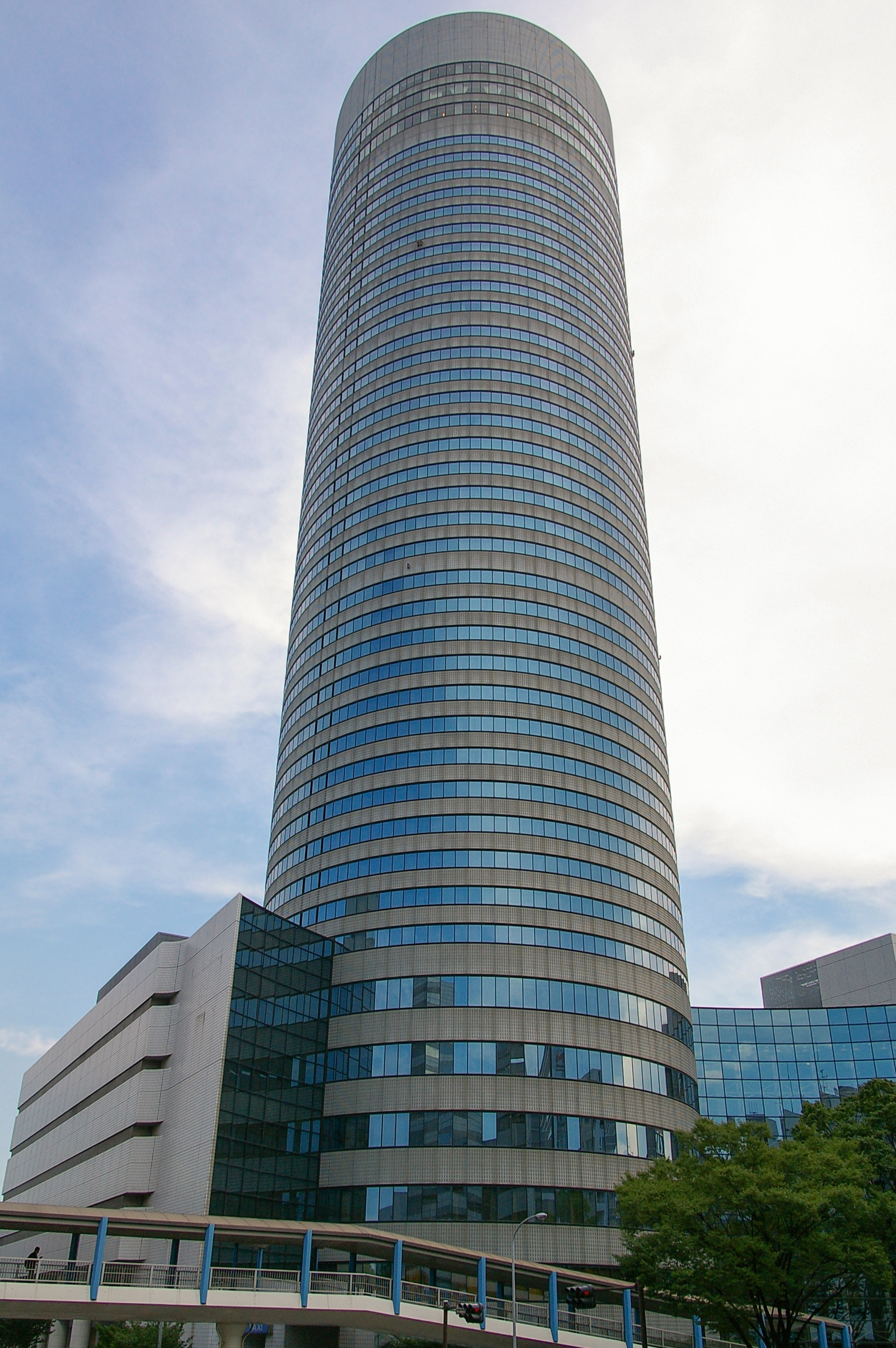
- Interactive map of the Shin Yokohama Prince Hotel area

General information
- Status: Completed
- Location: 3-4 Shin Yokohama, Kohoku-ku, Yokohama, Japan
- Coordinates: 35.510066°N 139.619555°E
- Completed: March 1992

Height
- Roof: 149.35 m (490.0 ft)

Technical details
- Floor count: 42 above ground 3 below ground
- Floor area: 127,195 m^{2} (1,369,120 sq ft)

Design and construction
- Architects: Design Department, Shimizu Corporation
- Structural engineer: Design Department, Shimizu Corporation
- Main contractor: Shimizu Corporation

Other information
- Number of rooms: 1,036+

The Shin Yokohama Prince Hotel (新横浜プリンスホテル) is a skyscraper in the Kohoku-ku ward of Yokohama, Japan. Completed in March 1992, it stands at 149.4 m (490 ft) tall. It is the 8th tallest building in Yokohama.
