= List of mergers in Niigata Prefecture =

Here is a list of mergers in Niigata Prefecture, Japan since the Heisei era.

== Mergers from April 1, 1999 to Present ==
- On January 1, 2001 - The town of Kurosaki (from Nishikanbara District) was merged into the expanded city of Niigata.
- On July 7, 2003 - The town of Toyoura (from Kitakanbara District) was merged into the expanded city of Shibata.
- On March 1, 2004 - The city of Ryōtsu was merged with the towns of Aikawa, Hamochi, Hatano, Kanai, Mano, Ogi and Sawata, and the villages of Akadomari and Niibo (all from Sado District) to create the city of Sado. Sado District was dissolved as a result of this merger.
- On April 1, 2004 - The towns of Suibara and Yasuda, and the villages of Kyogase and Sasakami (all from Kitakanbara District) were merged to create the city of Agano.
- On November 1, 2004 - The towns of Muika and Yamato (both from Minamiuonuma District) were merged to create the city of Minamiuonuma.
- On November 1, 2004 - The towns of Horinouchi and Koide, and the villages of Hirokami, Irihirose, Sumon and Yunotani (all from Kitauonuma District) were merged to create the city of Uonuma.
- On January 1, 2005 - The town of Yasuzuka, the villages of Maki, Ōshima and Uragawara (all from Higashikubiki District); the towns of Itakura, Kakizaki, Ōgata and Yoshikawa, the villages of Kiyosato, Kubiki, Nakagō and Sanwa (all from Nakakubiki District); and the town of Nadachi (from Nishikubiki District) were all merged into the expanded city of Jōetsu.
- On March 19, 2005 - The old city of Itoigawa absorbed the towns of Nō and Ōmi (both from Nishikubiki District) to create the new city of Itoigawa. Nishikubiki District was dissolved as a result of this merger.
- On March 21, 2005 - The cities of Niitsu, Shirone and Toyosaka, the towns of Kameda, Kosudo and Yokogoshi (all from Nakakanbara District); the town of Nishikawa, and the villages of Ajikata, Iwamuro, Katahigashi, Nakanokuchi and Tsukigata (all from Nishikanbara District) were all merged into the expanded city of Niigata.
- On April 1, 2005 - The town of Myōkōkōgen and the village of Myōkō (both from Nakakubiki District) were merged into the expanded city of Arai. Arai changed its name to Myōkō at the same time. Nakakubiki District was dissolved as a result of this merger.
- On April 1, 2005 - The town of Oguni (from Kariwa District); the village of Yamakoshi (from Koshi District); the town of Nakanoshima (from Minamikanbara District); and the towns of Koshiji and Mishima (both from Santō District) were merged into the expanded city of Nagaoka. Koshi District was dissolved as a result of this merger.
- On April 1, 2005 - The old city of Tōkamachi absorbed the towns of Matsudai and Matsunoyama (both from Higashikubiki District); the town of Kawanishi, and the village of Nakasato (both from Nakauonuma District) to create the new and expanded city of Tōkamachi. Higashikubiki District was dissolved as a result of this merger.
- On April 1, 2005 - The towns of Kanose and Tsugawa, and the villages of Kamikawa and Mikawa (all from Higashikanbara District) were merged to create the town of Aga.
- On May 1, 2005 - The towns of Nishiyama and Takayanagi (both from Kariwa District) were merged into the expanded city of Kashiwazaki.
- On May 1, 2005 - The town of Shiunji, and the village of Kajikawa (both from Kitakanbara District) were merged into the expanded city of Shibata.
- On May 1, 2005 - The old city of Sanjō absorbed the town of Sakae, and the village of Shitada (both from Minamikanbara District) to create the new and expanded city of Sanjō.
- On September 1, 2005 - The towns of Nakajō and Kurokawa (both from Kitakanbara District) were merged to create the city of Tainai.
- On October 1, 2005 - The town of Shiozawa (from Minamiuonuma District) was merged into the expanded city of Minamiuonuma.
- On October 10, 2005 - The town of Maki (from Nishikanbara District) was merged into the expanded city of Niigata.
- On January 1, 2006 - The town of Muramatsu (from Nakakanbara District) was merged into the expanded city of Gosen. Nakakanbara District was dissolved as a result of this merger.
- On January 1, 2006 - The city of Tochio, the towns of Teradomari and Yoita, and the village of Washima (all from Santō District) were all merged into the expanded city of Nagaoka.
- On March 20, 2006 - The old city of Tsubame absorbed the towns of Bunsui and Yoshida (both from Nishikanbara District) to create the new and expanded city of Tsubame.
- On April 1, 2008 - The old city of Murakami absorbed the towns of Arakawa and Sanpoku, and the villages of Asahi and Kamihayashi (all from Iwafune District) to create the new and expanded city of Murakami.
- On March 31, 2010 - The town of Kawaguchi (from Kitauonuma District) was merged into the expanded city of Nagaoka. Kitauonuma District was dissolved as a result of this merger.
