= Maki, Niigata =

Maki, Niigata may refer to:

- Maki, Niigata (Kanbara) (巻町; -machi), Nishikanbara District, Niigata, Japan
- Maki, Niigata (Kubiki) (牧村; -mura), Higashikubiki District, Niigata, Japan
