= Niigata College of Nursing =

Public university in Jōetsu, Niigata, Japan

- 新潟県立看護大学
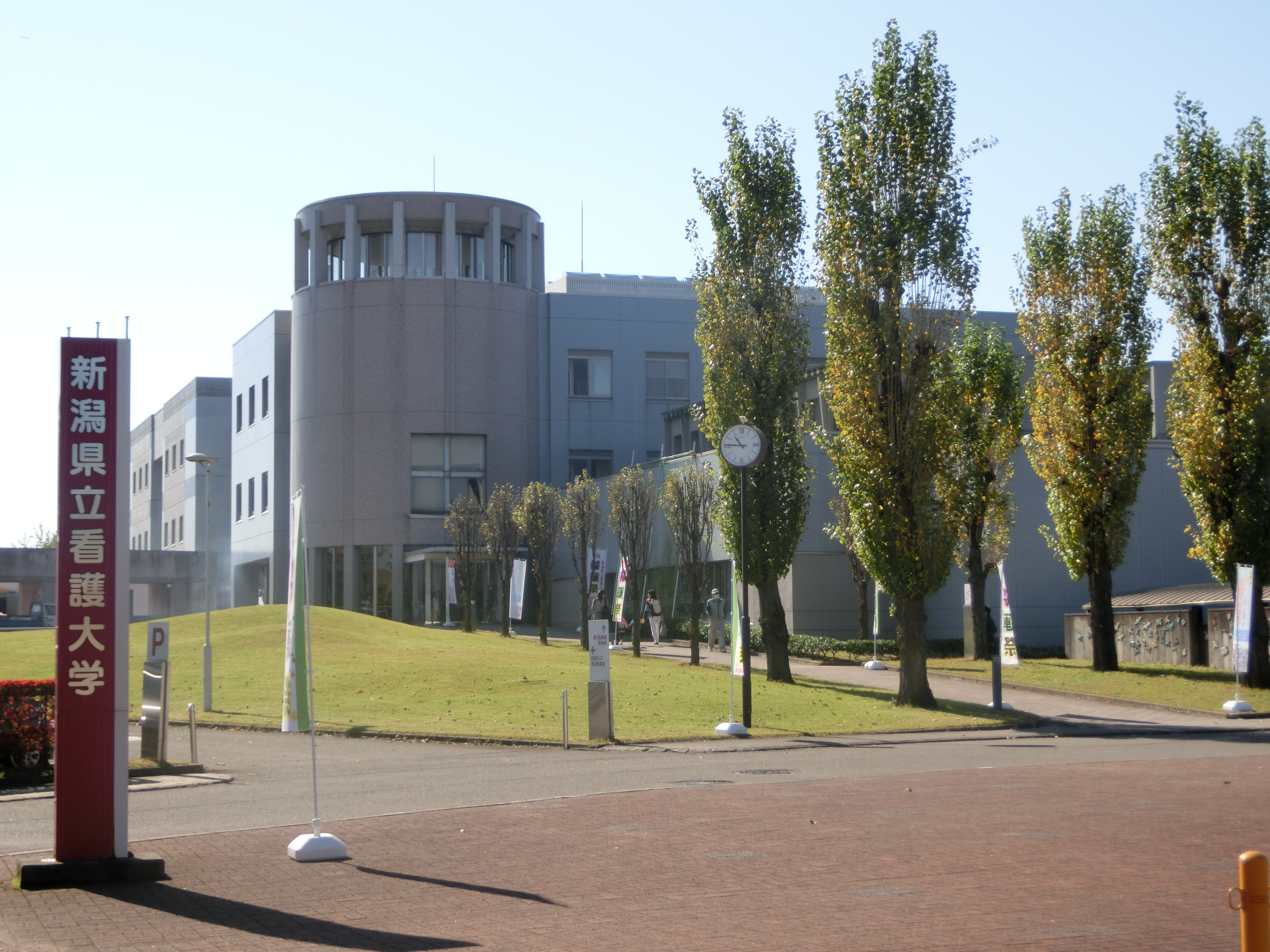
- Type: prefectural university
- Founder: 1978
- Location: Jōetsu, Niigata, Japan; 37°6′20.5″N 138°16′6.4″E
- Website: www.niigata-cn.ac.jp/index.html

Niigata College of Nursing (新潟県立看護大学, Niigata Kenritsu Kango Daigaku) is a public university at Jōetsu, Niigata, Japan. The predecessor of the school was founded in 1977, and it was chartered as a university in 2002.
