= Jōetsu, Niigata =

Jōetsu 上越市
- Special city
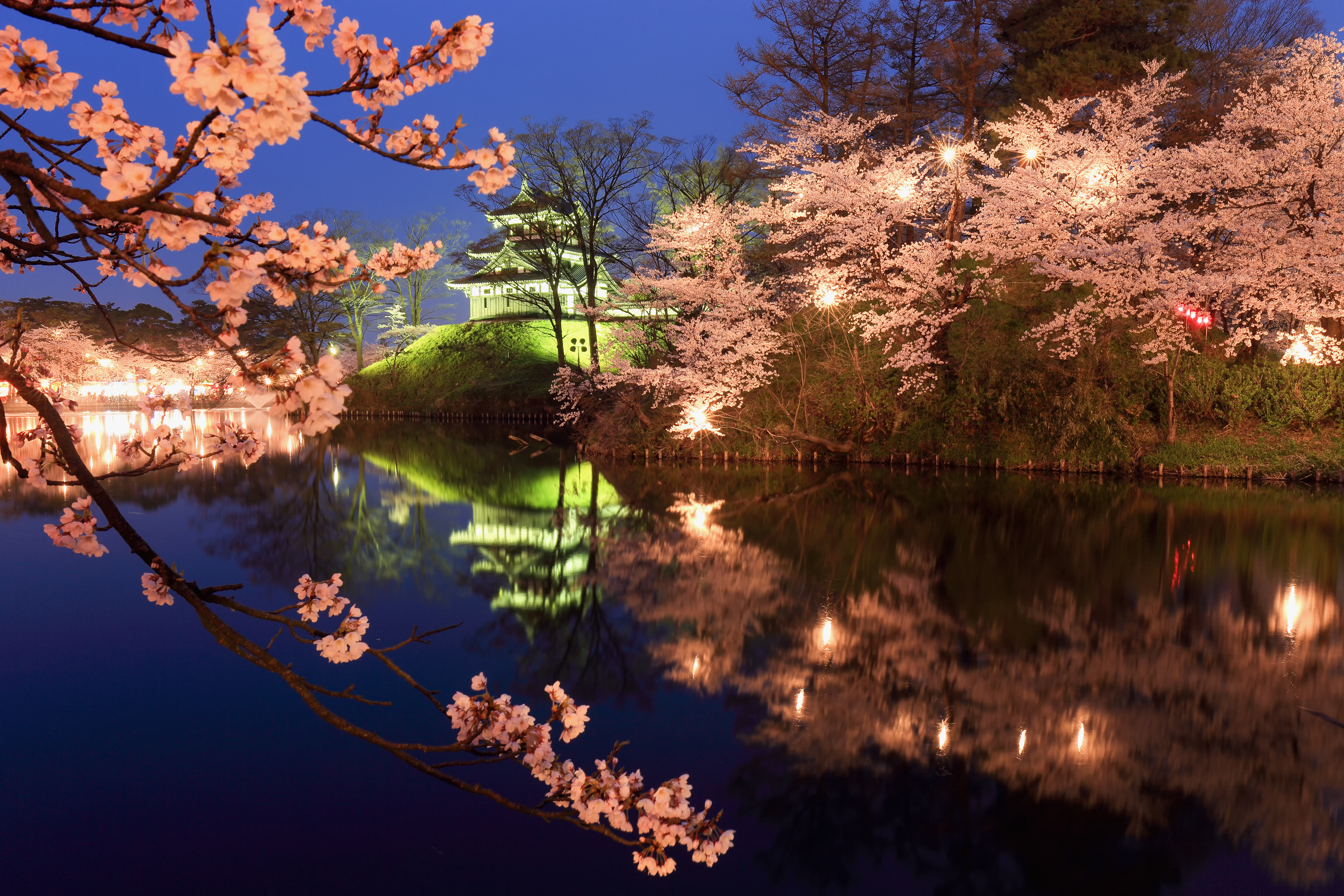

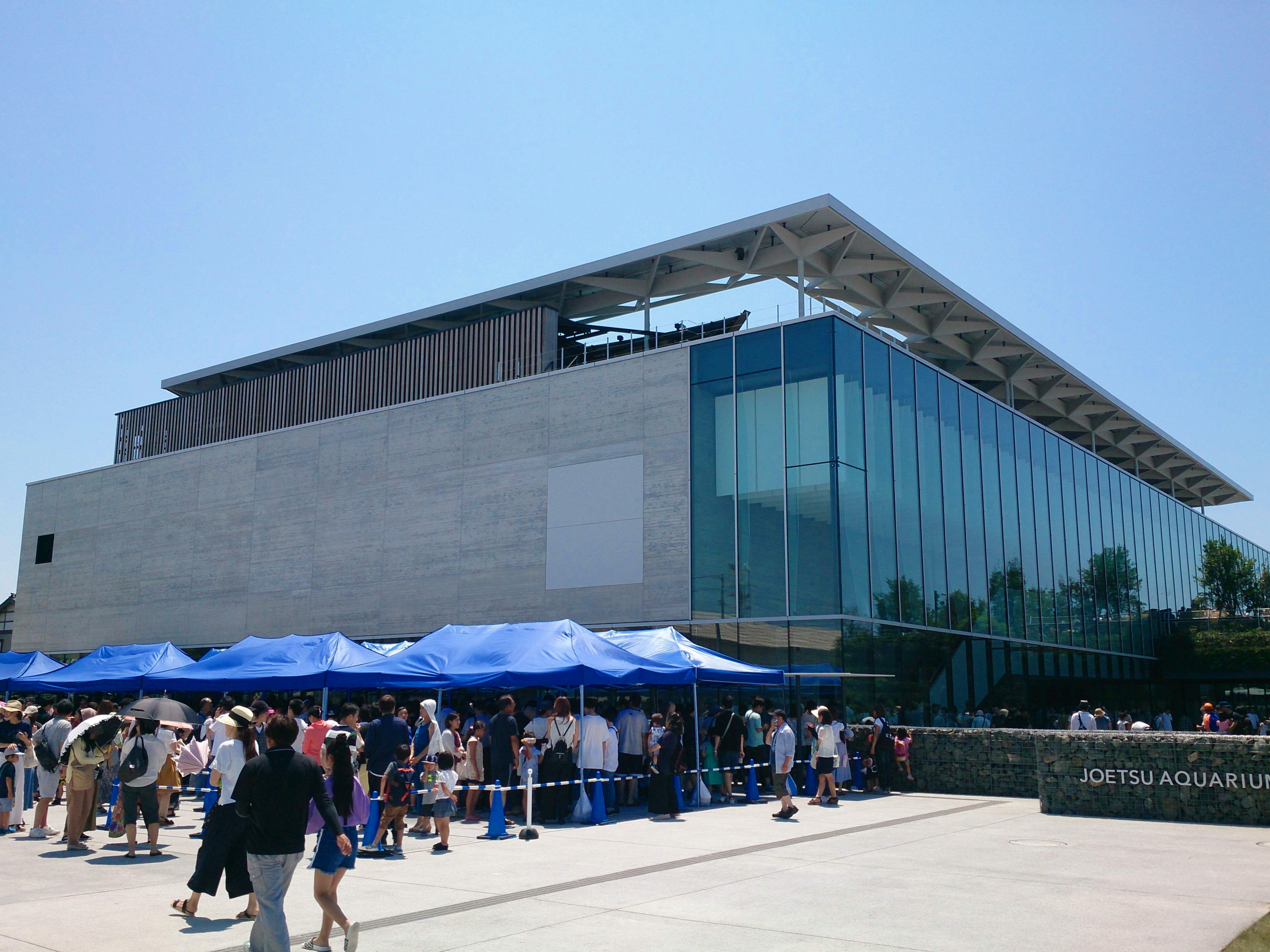

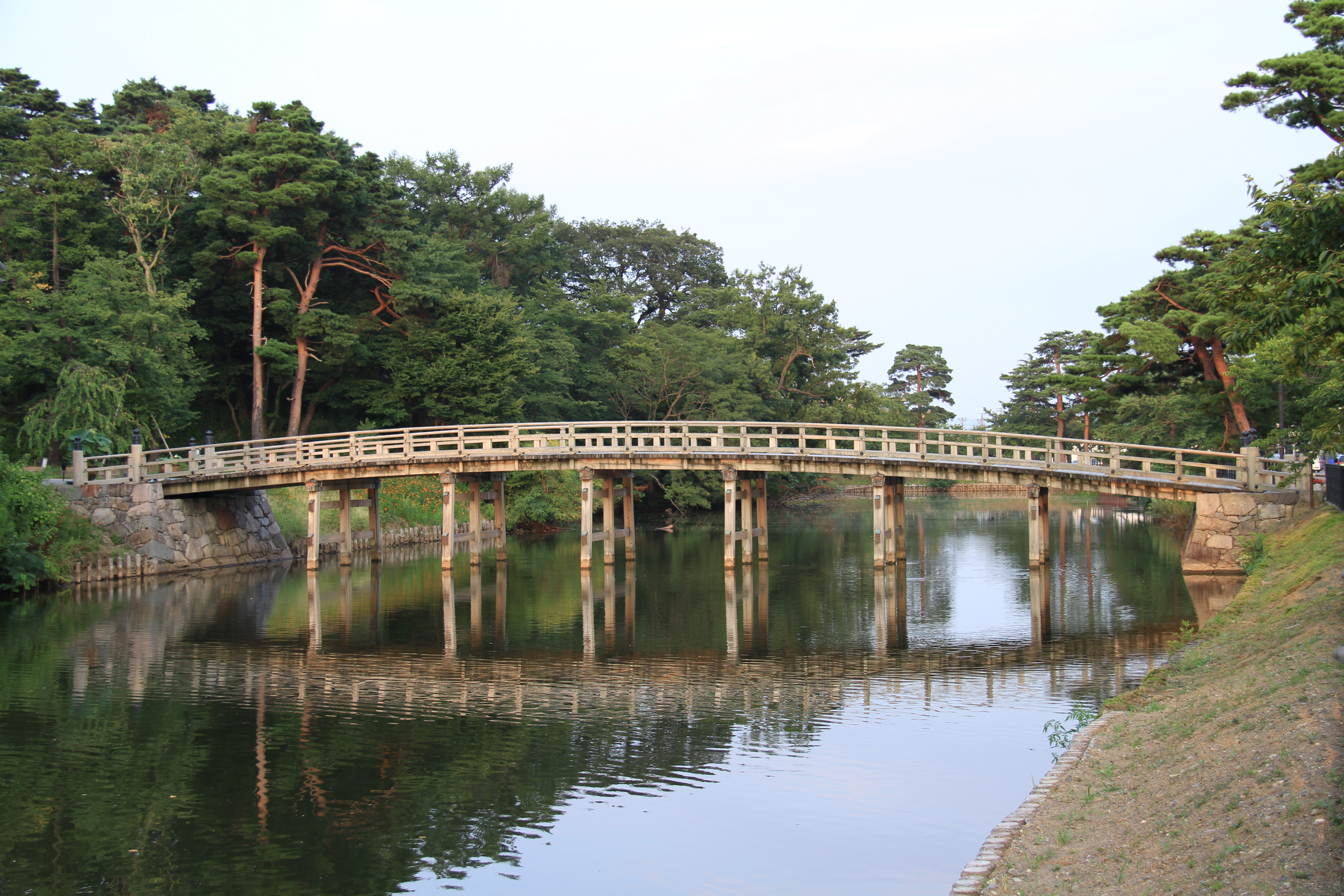

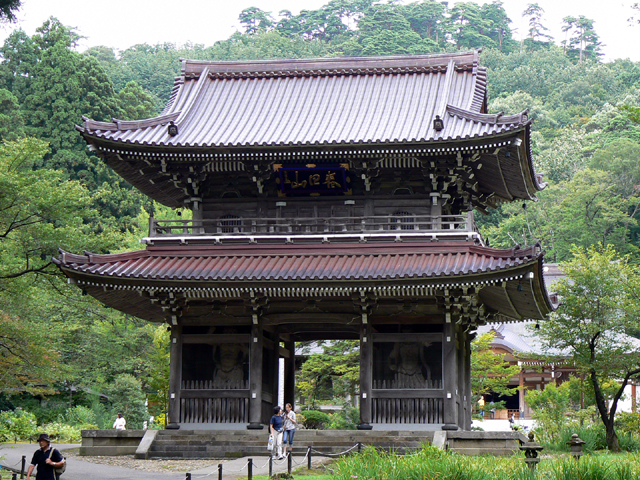

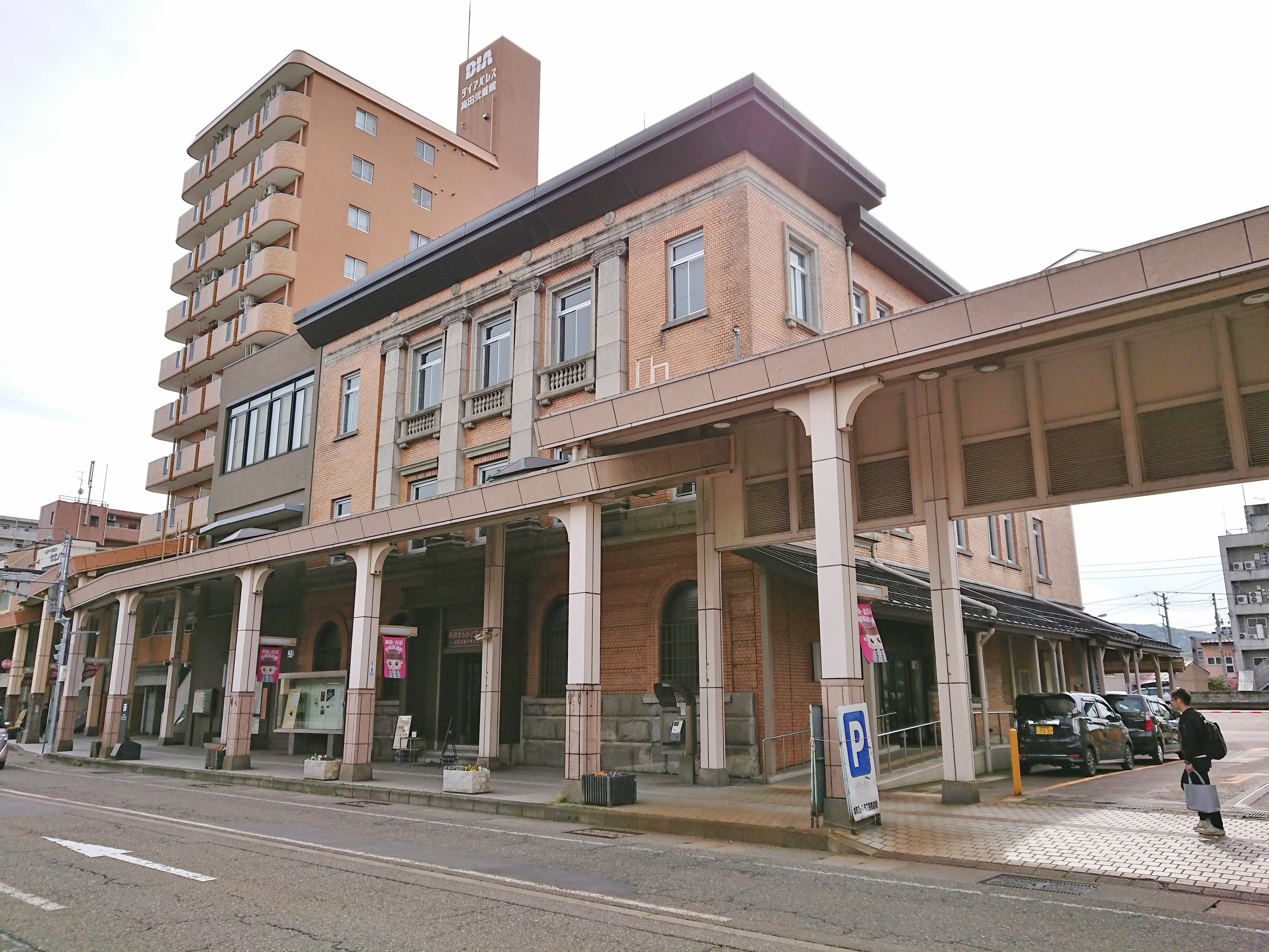
Takada Castle Park and sakura
Joetsu Aquarium Umigatari	Gokuraku Bridge at Takada Castle
Rinsen-ji	former No.139 National Bank Building
- Flag Seal

- Location of Jōetsu in Niigata

- Coordinates: 37°8′52.3″N 138°14′9.9″E
- Country: Japan
- Region: Chūbu (Kōshin'etsu) (Hokuriku)
- Prefecture: Niigata
- First official recorded: 702 AD
- Takada city established: September 1, 1911
- Naoetsu city established: June 1, 1954
- Two cities merged and current name: April 30, 1971

Government
  - Mayor: Jyunichi Kosuge (小菅淳一）- from November 2025

Area
  - Total: 973.81 km^{2} (375.99 sq mi)

Population (December 1, 2020)
  - Total: 189,430
  - Density: 194.52/km^{2} (503.82/sq mi)
- Time zone: UTC+9 (Japan Standard Time)
- Phone number: 025-526-5111
- Address: 1-1-3 Kida, Jōetsu-shi, Niigata-ken 943-8601
- Climate: Cfa
- Website: Official website
- Symbols
- Flower: Camellia
- Tree: Sakura

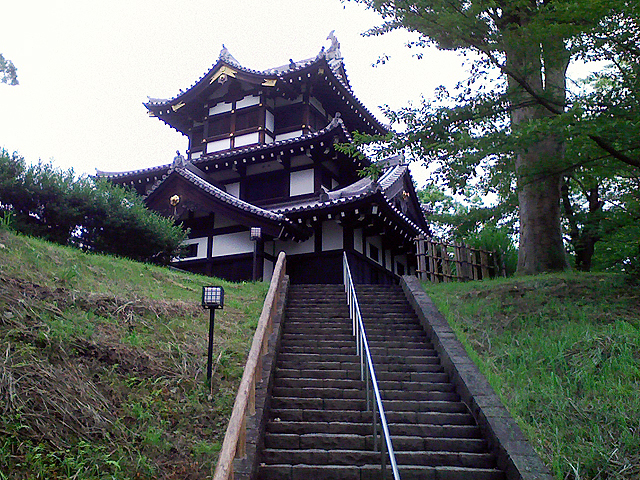
Takada Castle

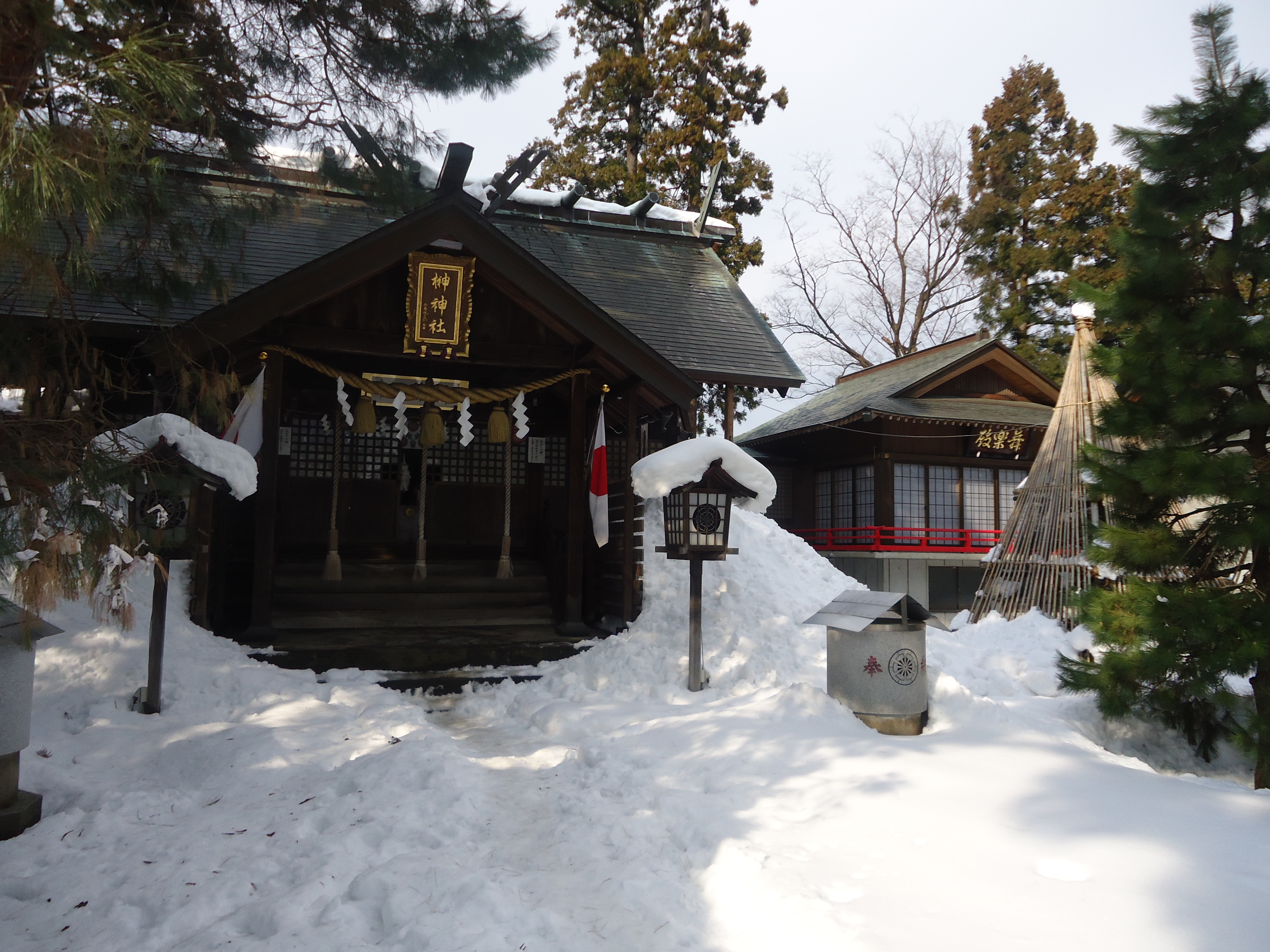
Sakaki Shrine

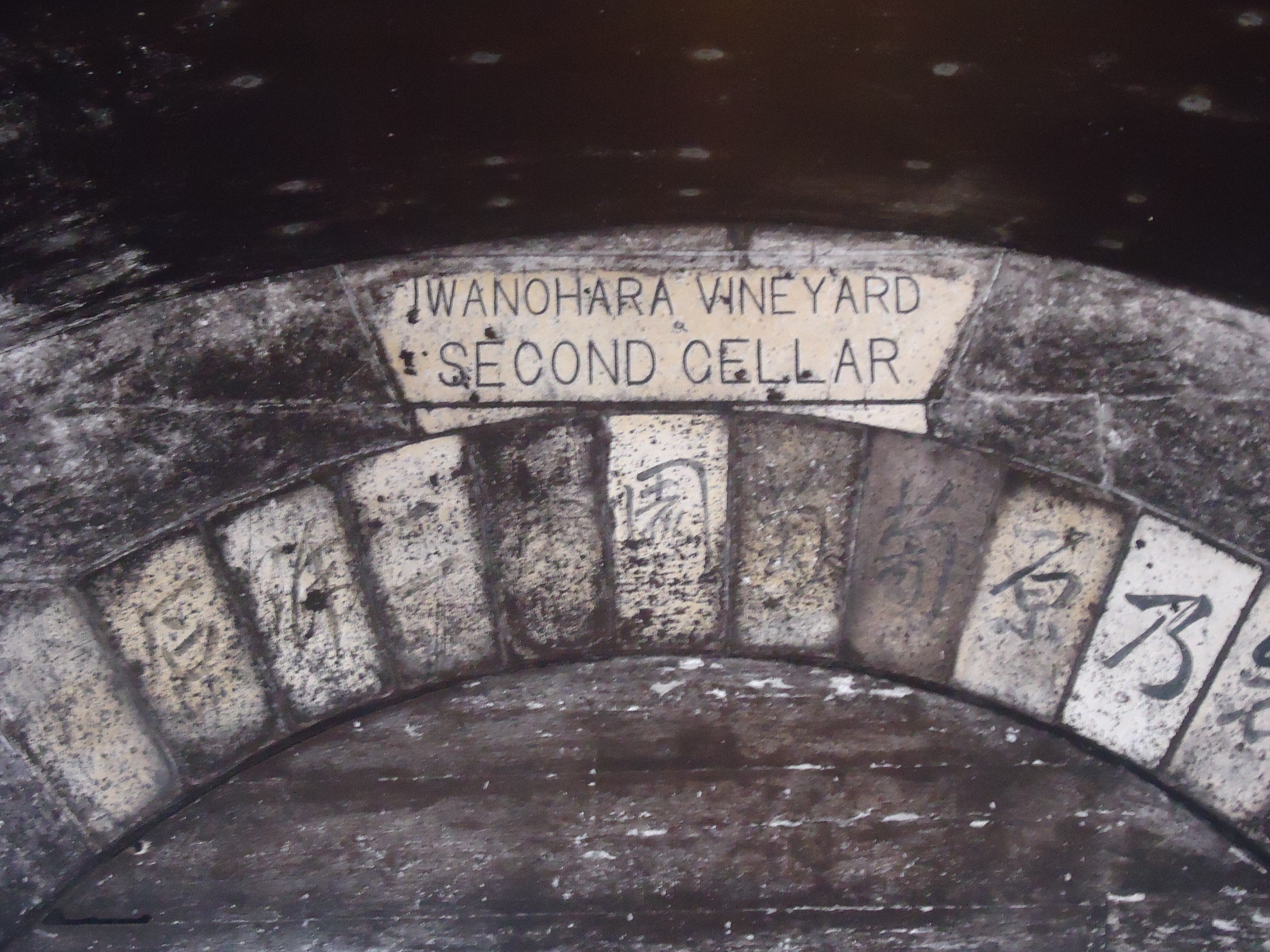
One of the oldest wineries in Japan and home to the grape Muscat Bailey A

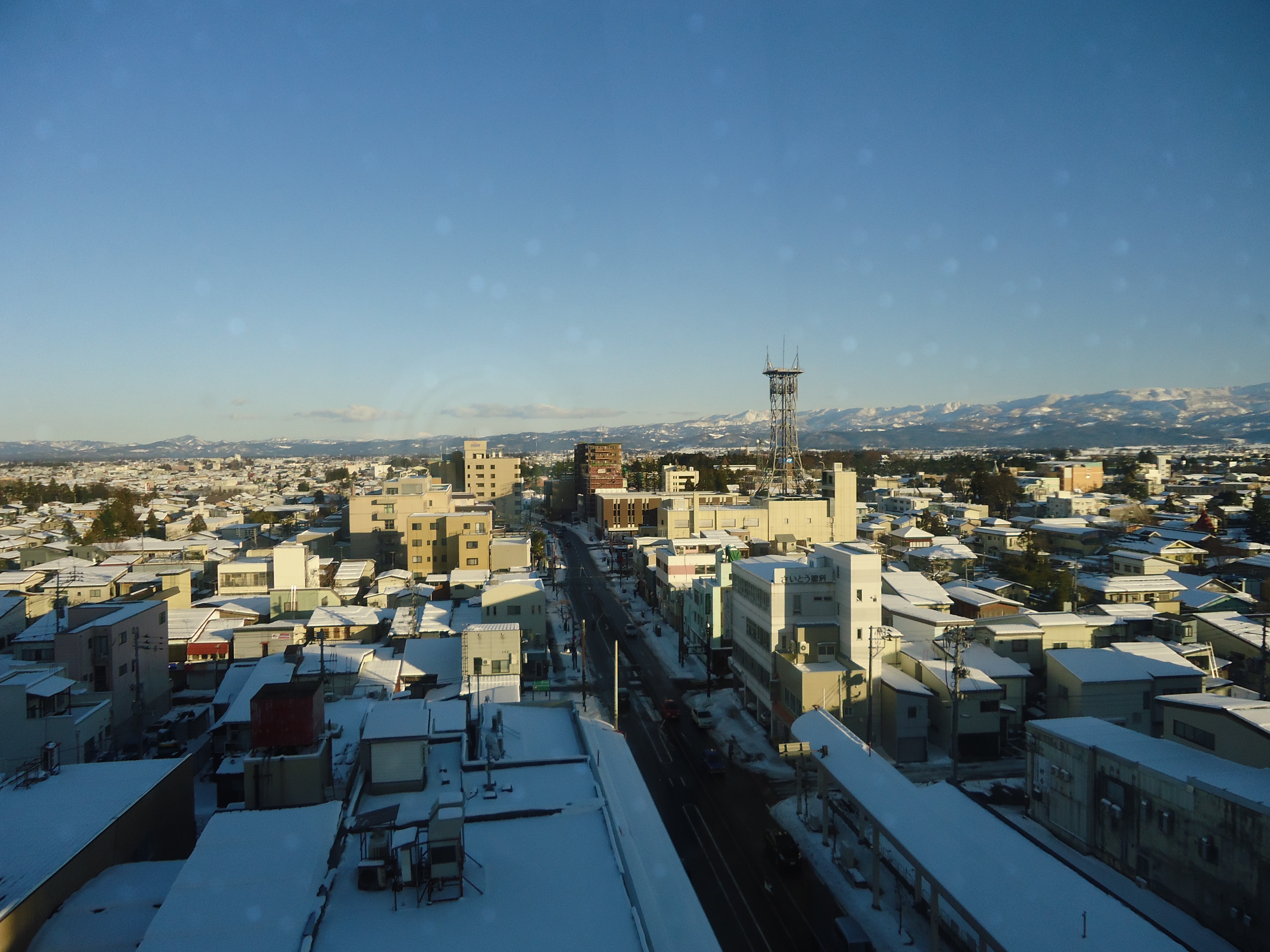
Sunrise over Takada

Jōetsu (上越市, Jōetsu-shi) is a city located in Niigata Prefecture, Japan. As of 1 December 2020, the city had an estimated population of 189,430, in 76,461 households with a population density of 190 persons per km^{2}. The total area of the city was 973.81 square kilometres (375.99 sq mi). Jōetsu borders the Sea of Japan and is renowned for its abundance of snow, the annual cherry-blossom festival, sake and Koshihikari rice.

== Toponymy ==
The kanji for Jōetsu combines 上 "upward", 越 "to surpass" and 市 "city", which can be misleading as the city is located in the southwestern part of Niigata Prefecture, closer to Toyama and Nagano Prefectures, as opposed to more northern areas in Niigata. Prior to the Meiji Restoration, Echigo Province was divided into three sections. One portion was called Kami Echigo (上越後), which was translated as "Upper Echigo", due its geographical proximity to the capital city of Kyoto. After the establishment of prefectures throughout Japan, the region name was shortened to "Jōetsu" (上越). When referring to Jōetsu, it could refer to the actual geographical Jōetsu region, which encompasses the cities of Jōetsu, Myōkō and Itoigawa, or may simply refer to the city of Jōetsu.

== Geography ==
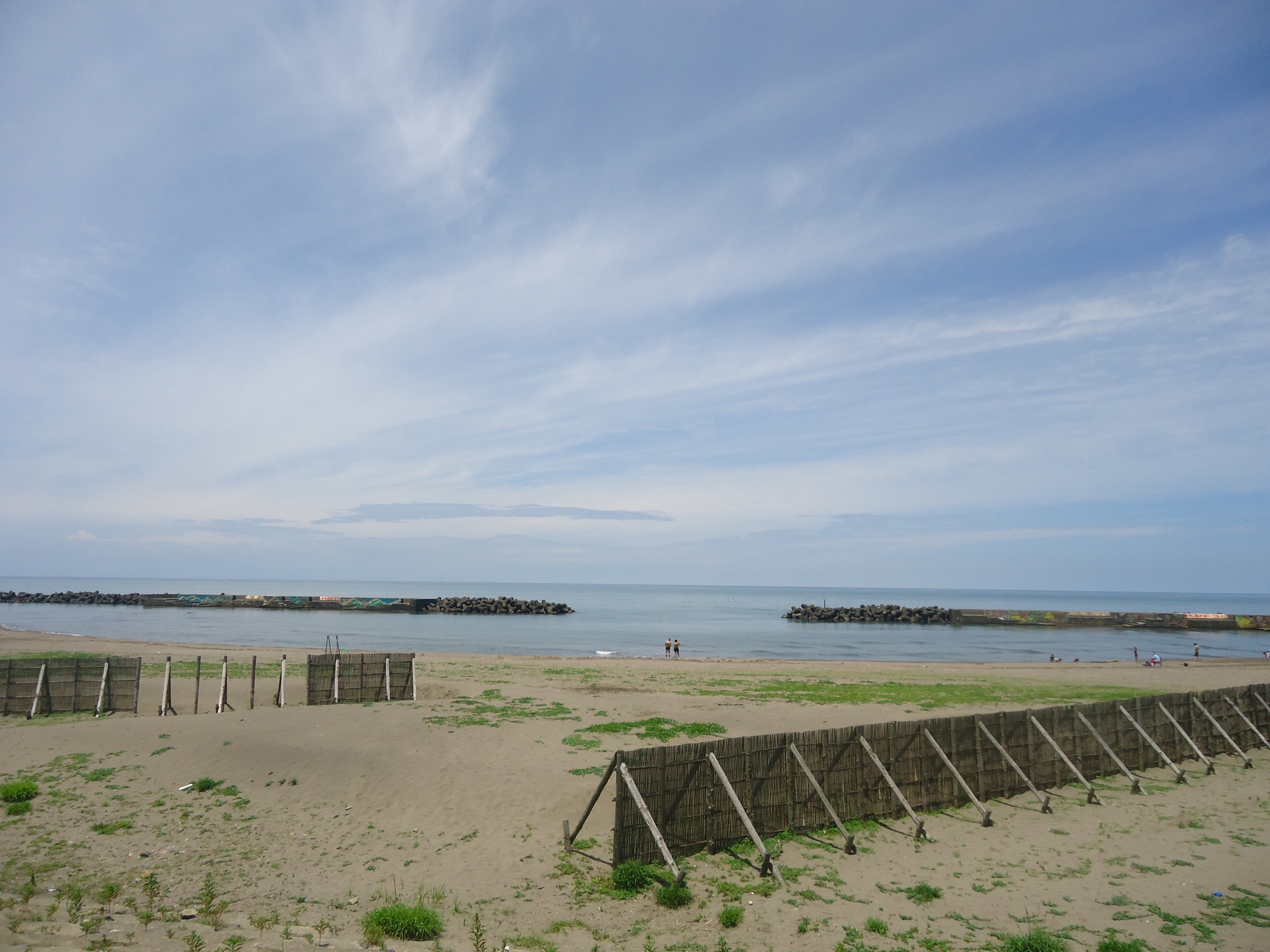
Sea of Japan at Naoetsu Beach

Jōetsu is in southwest Niigata Prefecture, bordered by the Sea of Japan to the north and Nagano Prefecture to the south. It is approximately 133 kilometers west of the city of Niigata, the prefectural capital and 139 kilometers east of Toyama.

=== Mountains ===
Surrounded by the Japanese Alps, Jōetsu contains four noteworthy mountains:

- Hishigatake-yama - part of the Shin-etsu trail and one location of the annual "Candle Road" festival
- Kanayasan - birthplace of skiing in Japan
- Kasugayama - formerly the location of Kasugayama Castle, home of the Sengoku period daimyō, Uesugi Kenshin
- Yoneyama - a sacred mountain on the border of Joetsu and neighboring Kashiwazaki City

Although part of neighboring city Myōkō, Mount Myōkō can also be vividly seen from Joetsu. Known for its heavy snowfall and ski resorts, Mt. Myōkō is listed as one of the 100 Famous Japanese Mountains, and is considered the "Mount Fuji of Echigo".

=== Surrounding municipalities ===
Nagano Prefecture

- Iiyama
- Sakae

Niigata Prefecture

- Itoigawa
- Kashiwazaki
- Myōkō
- Tōkamachi
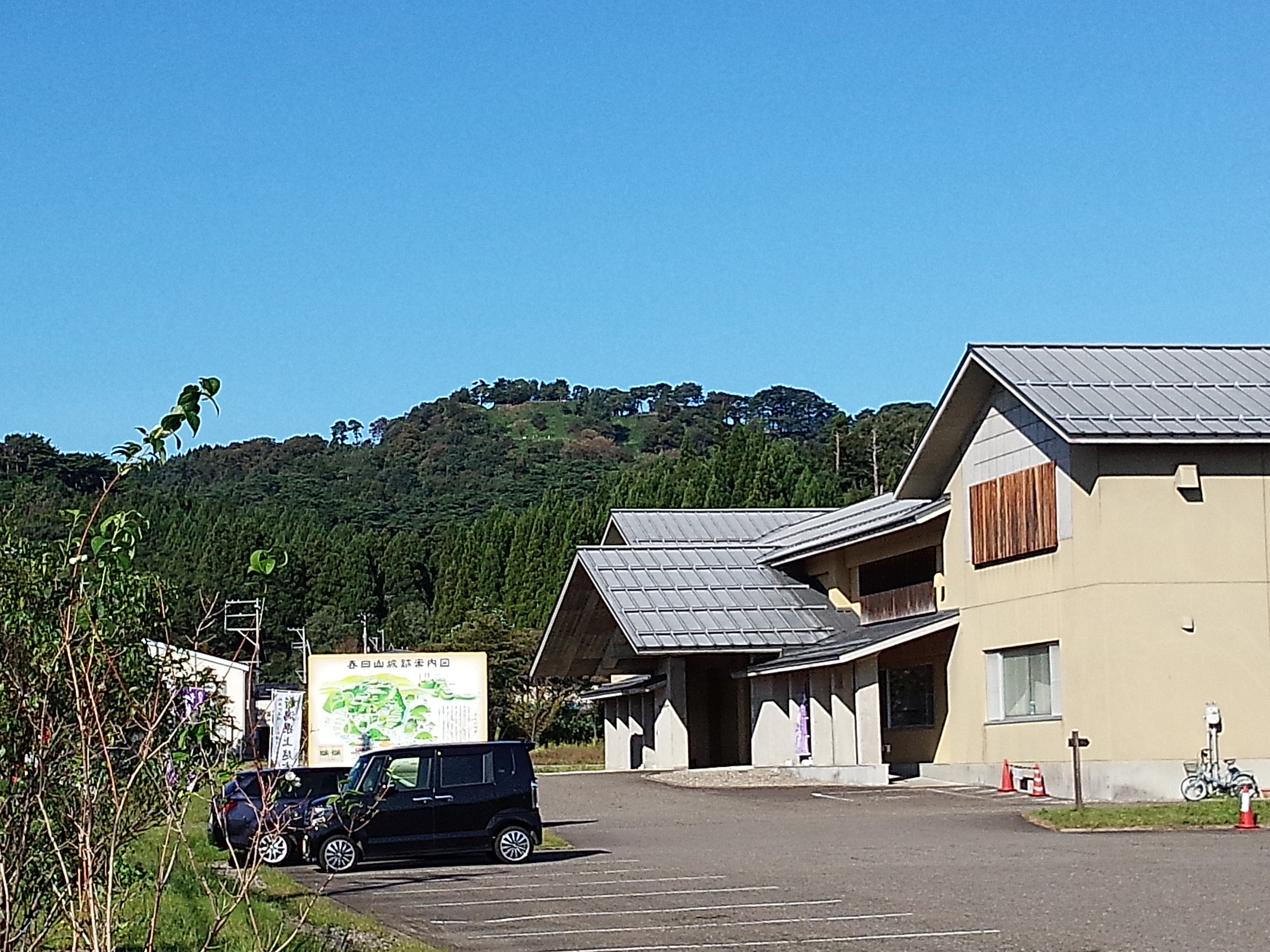
Kasugayama Castel ruins and Jōetsu-shi Maizō Bunkazai center

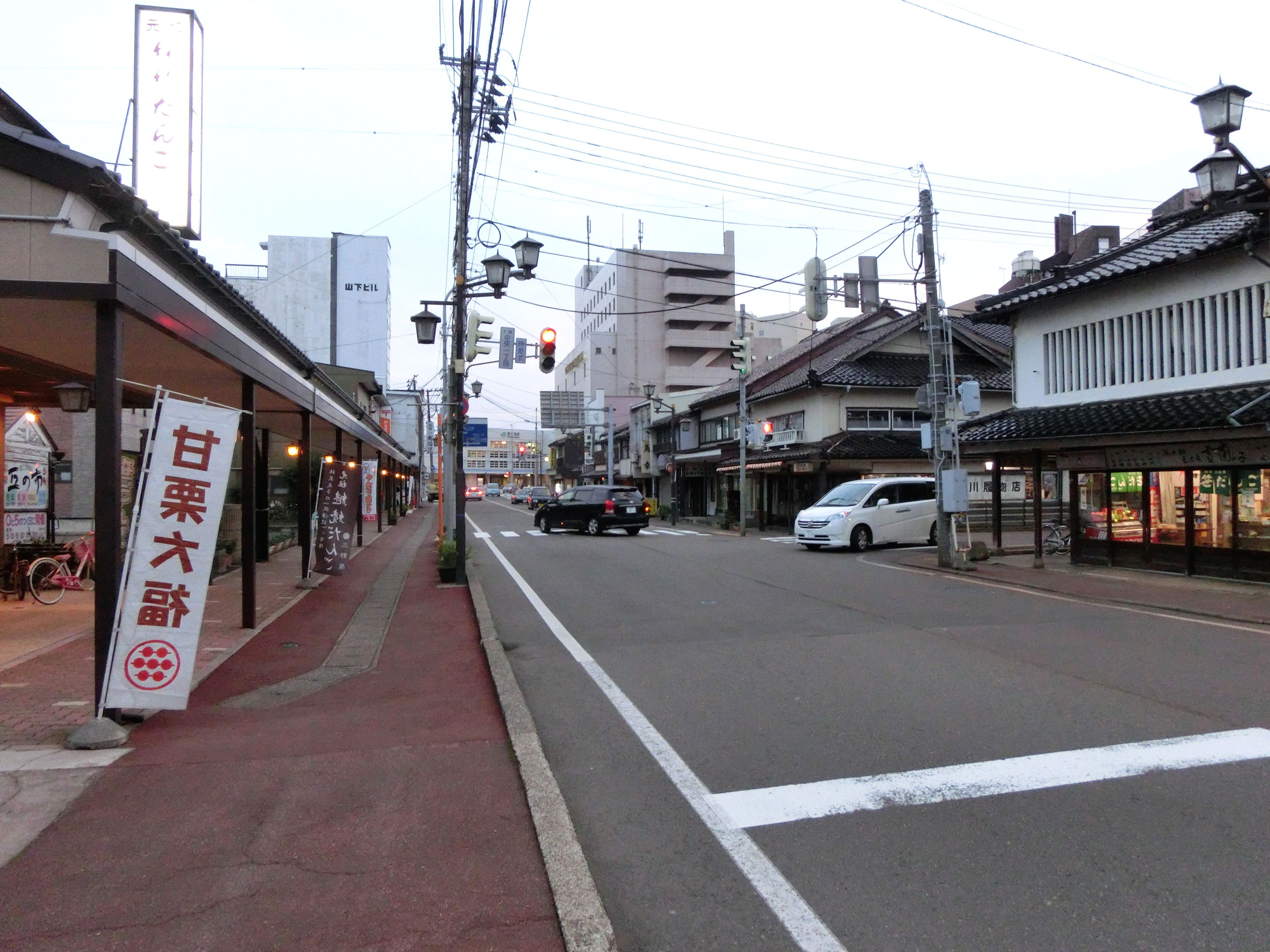
View of central Naoetsu area

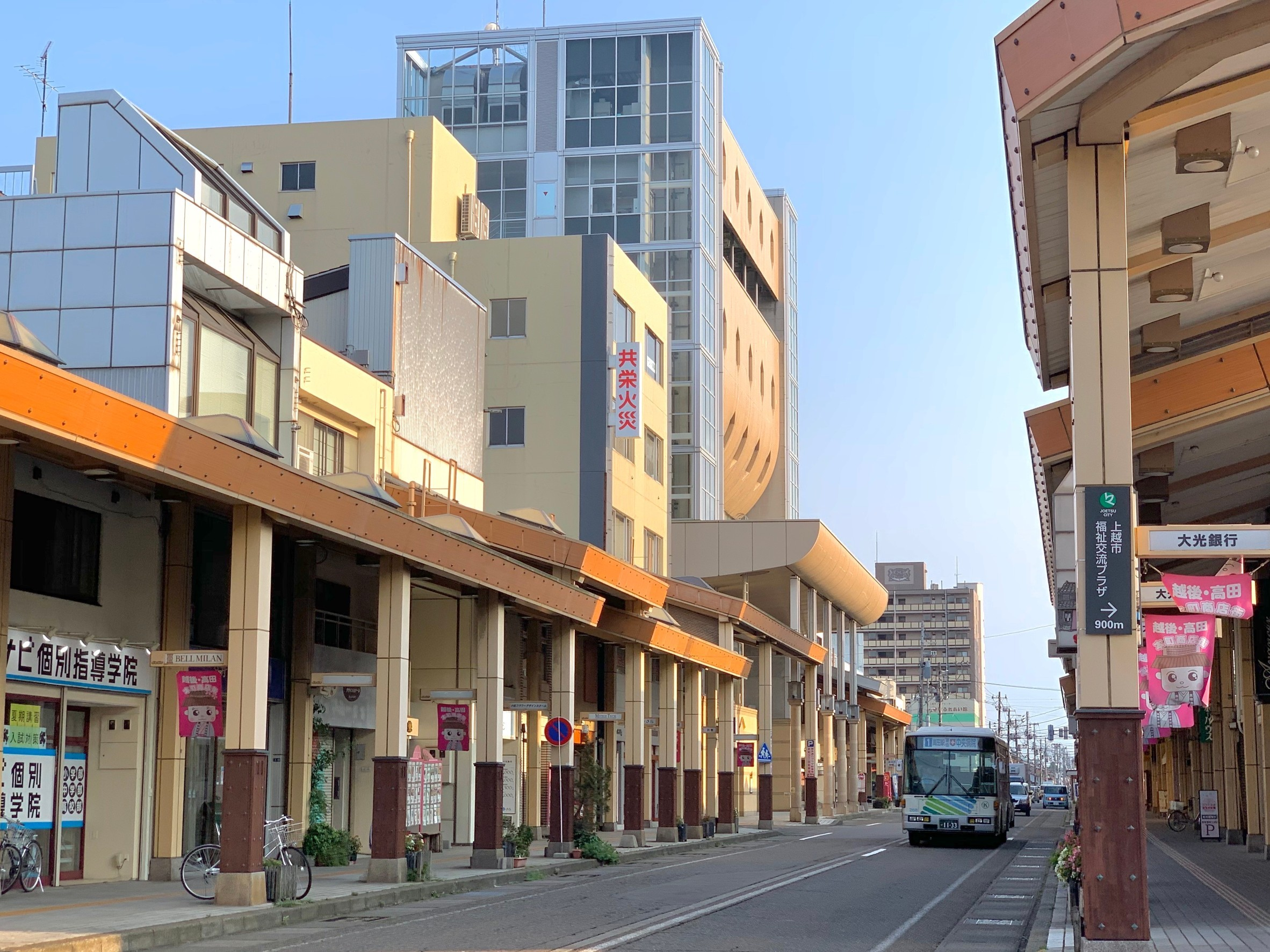
View of Central Takada area

=== Climate ===
Jōetsu has a humid subtropical climate (Köppen climate classification Cfa). The average annual temperature is 13.4 °C. The average annual rainfall is 2599 mm with January as the wettest month. The temperatures are highest on average in August, at around 26.0 °C, and lowest in January, at around 2.2 °C.

Owing to its coastal location facing onshore winds off the Sea of Japan, Jōetsu is the wettest low-lying part of the northern hemisphere temperate zone apart from the Owase region of the Kii Peninsula, receiving an average of around 2.8 metres (110.2 in) of precipitation per year. As a comparison, Forks on the windward side of Washington's Olympic Peninsula receives 110 inches (2.79 m) and Rize on the Black Sea coast of Turkey 2,530 millimetres (100 in). The cold winds from the combined power of the Siberian High and Aleutian Low give Jōetsu an average of 6.3 metres (250 in) of snowfall that however tends to melt significantly even during the winter. On February 26, 1945, Jōetsu received as much as 3.77 metres (148 in) of snow in one day. The heaviest annual snowfall, since the beginning of regular snowfall measurements in 1953, was 14.94 metres (590 in) in the 1985/1986 season and the heaviest monthly total precipitation 942 millimetres (37 in) in January 1945, whilst the driest month was August 1985 with 16 millimetres (0.63 in).

Climate data for Takada, Jōetsu, elevation 13 m (43 ft), (1991−2020 normals, extremes 1922−present)
Month	Jan	Feb	Mar	Apr	May	Jun	Jul	Aug	Sep	Oct	Nov	Dec	Year
Record high °C (°F)	19.4 (66.9)	22.5 (72.5)	30.0 (86.0)	32.3 (90.1)	33.1 (91.6)	36.7 (98.1)	38.9 (102.0)	40.3 (104.5)	39.3 (102.7)	34.1 (93.4)	28.1 (82.6)	23.7 (74.7)	40.3 (104.5)
Mean maximum °C (°F)	13.0 (55.4)	14.8 (58.6)	21.1 (70.0)	26.6 (79.9)	30.0 (86.0)	31.3 (88.3)	35.4 (95.7)	36.3 (97.3)	34.1 (93.4)	28.0 (82.4)	22.9 (73.2)	17.1 (62.8)	36.8 (98.2)
Mean daily maximum °C (°F)	6.0 (42.8)	6.7 (44.1)	10.9 (51.6)	17.6 (63.7)	22.7 (72.9)	25.8 (78.4)	29.6 (85.3)	31.3 (88.3)	27.1 (80.8)	21.5 (70.7)	15.5 (59.9)	9.3 (48.7)	18.7 (65.6)
Daily mean °C (°F)	2.5 (36.5)	2.7 (36.9)	5.8 (42.4)	11.7 (53.1)	17.0 (62.6)	20.9 (69.6)	25.0 (77.0)	26.4 (79.5)	22.3 (72.1)	16.4 (61.5)	10.5 (50.9)	5.3 (41.5)	13.9 (57.0)
Mean daily minimum °C (°F)	−0.4 (31.3)	−0.8 (30.6)	1.4 (34.5)	6.1 (43.0)	11.6 (52.9)	16.7 (62.1)	21.5 (70.7)	22.6 (72.7)	18.4 (65.1)	12.1 (53.8)	6.1 (43.0)	1.8 (35.2)	9.8 (49.6)
Mean minimum °C (°F)	−4.1 (24.6)	−4.6 (23.7)	−2.9 (26.8)	0.6 (33.1)	5.0 (41.0)	11.0 (51.8)	17.3 (63.1)	18.2 (64.8)	12.5 (54.5)	6.2 (43.2)	1.0 (33.8)	−2.0 (28.4)	−5.1 (22.8)
Record low °C (°F)	−10.7 (12.7)	−13.2 (8.2)	−10.3 (13.5)	−6.5 (20.3)	−0.4 (31.3)	6.4 (43.5)	11.6 (52.9)	13.0 (55.4)	8.3 (46.9)	1.2 (34.2)	−2.5 (27.5)	−7.8 (18.0)	−13.2 (8.2)
Average precipitation mm (inches)	429.6 (16.91)	263.3 (10.37)	194.7 (7.67)	105.3 (4.15)	87.0 (3.43)	136.5 (5.37)	206.8 (8.14)	184.5 (7.26)	205.8 (8.10)	213.9 (8.42)	334.2 (13.16)	475.5 (18.72)	2,837.1 (111.70)
Average snowfall cm (inches)	171 (67)	139 (55)	47 (19)	2 (0.8)	0 (0)	0 (0)	0 (0)	0 (0)	0 (0)	0 (0)	trace	67 (26)	413 (163)
Average extreme snow depth cm (inches)	79 (31)	95 (37)	54 (21)	2 (0.8)	0 (0)	0 (0)	0 (0)	0 (0)	0 (0)	0 (0)	0 (0)	32 (13)	96 (38)
Average precipitation days (≥ 1.0 mm)	24.8	20.4	19.0	12.3	10.0	11.3	13.2	11.4	13.9	14.6	18.6	23.2	192.7
Average snowy days (≥ 1 cm)	19.7	17.8	8.5	0.4	0	0	0	0	0	0	0.1	9.8	56.3
Average relative humidity (%)	79	76	72	67	71	78	81	78	79	78	78	78	76
Mean monthly sunshine hours	62.4	83.2	128.7	177.6	201.8	153.6	148.4	189.6	136.7	131.8	104.1	73.0	1,591.8
Source: Japan Meteorological Agency

Climate data for Ōgata, Jōetsu, elevation 13 m (43 ft), (1991−2020 normals, extremes 1978−present)
Month	Jan	Feb	Mar	Apr	May	Jun	Jul	Aug	Sep	Oct	Nov	Dec	Year
Record high °C (°F)	16.7 (62.1)	22.7 (72.9)	27.0 (80.6)	30.4 (86.7)	33.4 (92.1)	37.0 (98.6)	39.5 (103.1)	40.0 (104.0)	39.5 (103.1)	35.7 (96.3)	27.4 (81.3)	23.5 (74.3)	40.0 (104.0)
Mean daily maximum °C (°F)	6.3 (43.3)	6.7 (44.1)	10.1 (50.2)	15.6 (60.1)	20.5 (68.9)	23.9 (75.0)	28.0 (82.4)	30.0 (86.0)	26.3 (79.3)	20.8 (69.4)	15.1 (59.2)	9.5 (49.1)	17.7 (63.9)
Daily mean °C (°F)	2.9 (37.2)	3.0 (37.4)	5.8 (42.4)	10.9 (51.6)	16.1 (61.0)	20.3 (68.5)	24.4 (75.9)	26.0 (78.8)	22.1 (71.8)	16.4 (61.5)	10.6 (51.1)	5.5 (41.9)	13.7 (56.6)
Mean daily minimum °C (°F)	−0.2 (31.6)	−0.6 (30.9)	1.5 (34.7)	6.2 (43.2)	11.9 (53.4)	17.0 (62.6)	21.5 (70.7)	22.6 (72.7)	18.4 (65.1)	12.2 (54.0)	6.2 (43.2)	1.9 (35.4)	9.9 (49.8)
Record low °C (°F)	−10.0 (14.0)	−8.0 (17.6)	−6.6 (20.1)	−3.0 (26.6)	3.2 (37.8)	9.0 (48.2)	13.7 (56.7)	14.2 (57.6)	8.5 (47.3)	1.9 (35.4)	−2.1 (28.2)	−7.6 (18.3)	−10.0 (14.0)
Average precipitation mm (inches)	293.1 (11.54)	173.4 (6.83)	143.5 (5.65)	93.4 (3.68)	88.4 (3.48)	140.3 (5.52)	208.7 (8.22)	160.7 (6.33)	187.0 (7.36)	180.4 (7.10)	296.0 (11.65)	358.0 (14.09)	2,321.7 (91.41)
Average precipitation days (≥ 1.0 mm)	25.6	20.9	18.4	13.2	10.7	11.1	13.0	10.7	13.8	14.7	19.2	24.9	196.2
Mean monthly sunshine hours	44.3	69.6	131.1	186.5	208.7	166.8	168.5	210.4	149.8	137.0	95.6	59.7	1,639.8
Source: Japan Meteorological Agency

Climate data for Nō, Jōetsu, elevation 55 m (180 ft), (1991−2020 normals, extremes 1978−present)
Month	Jan	Feb	Mar	Apr	May	Jun	Jul	Aug	Sep	Oct	Nov	Dec	Year
Record high °C (°F)	17.5 (63.5)	22.5 (72.5)	27.3 (81.1)	29.6 (85.3)	30.2 (86.4)	32.8 (91.0)	36.5 (97.7)	36.9 (98.4)	36.6 (97.9)	33.5 (92.3)	26.9 (80.4)	22.9 (73.2)	36.9 (98.4)
Mean daily maximum °C (°F)	5.6 (42.1)	6.0 (42.8)	9.6 (49.3)	15.7 (60.3)	20.8 (69.4)	23.9 (75.0)	27.8 (82.0)	29.4 (84.9)	25.6 (78.1)	20.2 (68.4)	14.5 (58.1)	8.8 (47.8)	17.3 (63.2)
Daily mean °C (°F)	2.2 (36.0)	2.1 (35.8)	4.9 (40.8)	10.4 (50.7)	15.8 (60.4)	19.8 (67.6)	23.9 (75.0)	25.1 (77.2)	21.1 (70.0)	15.5 (59.9)	9.9 (49.8)	4.8 (40.6)	13.0 (55.3)
Mean daily minimum °C (°F)	−0.6 (30.9)	−1.1 (30.0)	1.0 (33.8)	5.6 (42.1)	11.1 (52.0)	16.1 (61.0)	20.6 (69.1)	21.6 (70.9)	17.6 (63.7)	11.8 (53.2)	6.0 (42.8)	1.6 (34.9)	9.3 (48.7)
Record low °C (°F)	−7.3 (18.9)	−8.1 (17.4)	−5.8 (21.6)	−2.2 (28.0)	2.7 (36.9)	7.6 (45.7)	13.4 (56.1)	14.3 (57.7)	7.8 (46.0)	2.6 (36.7)	−0.5 (31.1)	−6.1 (21.0)	−8.1 (17.4)
Average precipitation mm (inches)	387.3 (15.25)	233.3 (9.19)	208.1 (8.19)	136.8 (5.39)	124.6 (4.91)	174.3 (6.86)	243.4 (9.58)	237.9 (9.37)	281.9 (11.10)	293.6 (11.56)	404.4 (15.92)	474.4 (18.68)	3,223.5 (126.91)
Average snowfall cm (inches)	204 (80)	181 (71)	62 (24)	2 (0.8)	0 (0)	0 (0)	0 (0)	0 (0)	0 (0)	0 (0)	0 (0)	72 (28)	505 (199)
Average extreme snow depth cm (inches)	83 (33)	91 (36)	49 (19)	1 (0.4)	0 (0)	0 (0)	0 (0)	0 (0)	0 (0)	0 (0)	0 (0)	30 (12)	94 (37)
Average precipitation days (≥ 1.0 mm)	25.2	20.1	18.9	13.1	11.5	12.1	14.5	11.5	14.8	15.8	19.2	23.9	200.6
Average snowy days (≥ 3 cm)	16.4	15.7	6.5	0.2	0	0	0	0	0	0	0.1	6.6	45.5
Mean monthly sunshine hours	41.3	70.3	118.9	175.2	198.5	142.7	140.0	185.8	129.2	126.9	96.7	57.2	1,478.3
Source: Japan Meteorological Agency

Climate data for Yasuzuka, Jōetsu, elevation 126 m (413 ft), (1991−2020 normals, extremes 1978−present)
Month	Jan	Feb	Mar	Apr	May	Jun	Jul	Aug	Sep	Oct	Nov	Dec	Year
Record high °C (°F)	16.9 (62.4)	19.8 (67.6)	25.8 (78.4)	31.0 (87.8)	32.0 (89.6)	36.5 (97.7)	37.6 (99.7)	37.6 (99.7)	36.7 (98.1)	32.9 (91.2)	26.8 (80.2)	21.7 (71.1)	37.6 (99.7)
Mean daily maximum °C (°F)	4.0 (39.2)	4.8 (40.6)	8.6 (47.5)	15.7 (60.3)	21.6 (70.9)	24.6 (76.3)	28.1 (82.6)	29.8 (85.6)	25.7 (78.3)	19.8 (67.6)	13.8 (56.8)	7.3 (45.1)	17.0 (62.6)
Daily mean °C (°F)	0.6 (33.1)	0.6 (33.1)	3.2 (37.8)	9.3 (48.7)	15.5 (59.9)	19.6 (67.3)	23.6 (74.5)	24.7 (76.5)	20.6 (69.1)	14.5 (58.1)	8.5 (47.3)	3.1 (37.6)	12.0 (53.6)
Mean daily minimum °C (°F)	−2.3 (27.9)	−2.9 (26.8)	−1.0 (30.2)	3.7 (38.7)	9.8 (49.6)	15.2 (59.4)	19.9 (67.8)	20.7 (69.3)	16.6 (61.9)	10.3 (50.5)	4.2 (39.6)	−0.1 (31.8)	7.8 (46.1)
Record low °C (°F)	−10.9 (12.4)	−11.0 (12.2)	−9.0 (15.8)	−4.5 (23.9)	1.1 (34.0)	5.4 (41.7)	12.7 (54.9)	12.8 (55.0)	6.0 (42.8)	1.3 (34.3)	−2.6 (27.3)	−8.5 (16.7)	−11.0 (12.2)
Average precipitation mm (inches)	387.3 (15.25)	229.5 (9.04)	172.8 (6.80)	114.1 (4.49)	109.3 (4.30)	150.0 (5.91)	213.4 (8.40)	194.0 (7.64)	202.9 (7.99)	207.8 (8.18)	286.5 (11.28)	411.5 (16.20)	2,696.3 (106.15)
Average snowfall cm (inches)	293 (115)	236 (93)	125 (49)	13 (5.1)	0 (0)	0 (0)	0 (0)	0 (0)	0 (0)	0 (0)	2 (0.8)	134 (53)	799 (315)
Average extreme snow depth cm (inches)	141 (56)	167 (66)	132 (52)	40 (16)	0 (0)	0 (0)	0 (0)	0 (0)	0 (0)	0 (0)	1 (0.4)	60 (24)	174 (69)
Average precipitation days (≥ 1.0 mm)	25.4	21.1	19.6	14.1	11.5	12.0	14.5	11.8	14.9	15.4	18.1	22.9	201.3
Average snowy days (≥ 3 cm)	19.9	17.6	13.4	2.0	0	0	0	0	0	0	0.3	9.7	62.9
Mean monthly sunshine hours	42.2	61.8	107.9	163.7	193.7	142.1	136.8	181.4	129.3	126.8	101.3	61.1	1,444.1
Source: Japan Meteorological Agency

== Demographics ==
Per Japanese census data, the population of Jōetsu has declined over the past 60 years.

Historical population
Year	Pop.	±%
1960	234,673	—
1970	217,679	−7.2%
1980	216,320	−0.6%
1990	212,248	−1.9%
2000	211,870	−0.2%
2010	203,899	−3.8%
2020	188,047	−7.8%

== History ==
Yellow: 13 former municipalities merged into Joetsu in 2005.

The area of present-day Jōetsu has been inhabited for thousands of years, and the ruins of numerous Jōmon period and Kofun period settlements, tombs and fortifications have been found. The area was part of ancient Echigo Province, and the location of the Nara period provincial capital. During the Sengoku period, it was the center of the holdings of the Uesugi clan and notably Kasugayama Castle was the headquarters of the famed warlord Uesugi Kenshin. The Uesugi clan were transferred by Toyotomi Hideyoshi to Aizu and the area later came under the Takada Domain during the Edo period Tokugawa Shogunate.

In 1614, Matsudaira Tadateru, the 6th son of Tokugawa Ieyasu was assigned to Echigo Province and ordered the construction of Takada Castle. The domain was later ruled by a number of fudai daimyō houses. The last daimyō of Takada Domain was Sakakibara Masataka, who sided with the imperial forces in the Boshin War of the Meiji restoration and who subsequently served as imperial governor until the abolition of the han system in 1871 by the Meiji government.

The towns of Takada and Naoetsu were created with the establishment of the modern municipalities system on April 1, 1889. Takada was elevated to city status on September 1, 1911 and Naoetsu on June 1, 1954. Takada and Naoetsu merged to form the city of Jōetsu in 1971.

On January 1, 2005, Jōetsu annexed 13 neighbouring municipalities, expanding its area by four times. The municipalities that were annexed into consisted of the following: the town of Yasuzuka, the villages of Maki, Ōshima and Uragawara (all from Higashikubiki District); the towns of Itakura, Kakizaki, Ōgata and Yoshikawa, and the villages of Kiyosato, Kubiki, Nakagō and Sanwa (all from Nakakubiki District); and the town of and Nadachi (from Nishikubiki District). On April 1, 2007, Jōetsu attained Special city status, which gives it greater local autonomy from the prefectural government.

=== Skiing in Japan ===
The victory in the Russo-Japanese War in 1905 brought about newfound interest in Japanese military strategy which prompted European powers to send troops to Japan to study new methods of combat. One of the soldiers, an Austro-Hungarian major named Theodor von Lerch, made a profound difference to the Jōetsu locals as well as the nation itself by introducing the sport of skiing to Japan. On January 12, 1911, Lerch began his ski training on Mt. Kanaya. The participants consisted of both soldiers and civilians. Lerch taught using the "Stemboggen" method, which involved a single bamboo pole that served a dual purpose as a steering tool and as a brake. With the translation help of the IJA 13th Division commander Gaishi Nagaoka, the Takada Ski Club eventually amassed over 6,000 members in 1912. Soon after, skiing spread across the nation, especially in areas where snow dominated the landscape. It provided a new mode of transportation not only for the military, but for those who were rendered immobile by the seemingly impassible slopes of white. To commemorate his contribution, the Japan Ski Origins Museum was erected on Mt. Kanaya in time to coincide with the 80th anniversary of skiing's inception in Japan.

=== World War II ===
During World War II, the city of Naoetsu was the site of a POW camp that garnered international focus from the best-selling biography, Unbroken: A World War II Story of Survival, Resilience, and Redemption by Laura Hillenbrand and later, the movie adaptation, "Unbroken" in 2014. The book and movie focus on former Olympic track star Louis Zamperini and the brutal mistreatment of him and his fellow soldiers at the hands of the Imperial Japanese Army corporal, Mutsuhiro Watanabe, infamously known as "The Bird". According to the book, Watanabe fled Naoetsu after the Allied forces invaded Japan and was never charged, despite being one of General Douglas MacArthur's top 40 most-wanted war criminals.

The Naoetsu POW camp also housed over 300 Australian soldiers, 60 of which died from sickness and poor living conditions. In October 1995, fifty years following the end of the war, the Peace Memorial Park and Peace Statues were founded and built by Jōetsu to promote peace and friendship. The following year, the Japan-Australia Society of Jōetsu was established with the purpose of educating future generations and maintaining a lasting relationship with Australian citizens abroad and living throughout Joetsu.

== Government ==
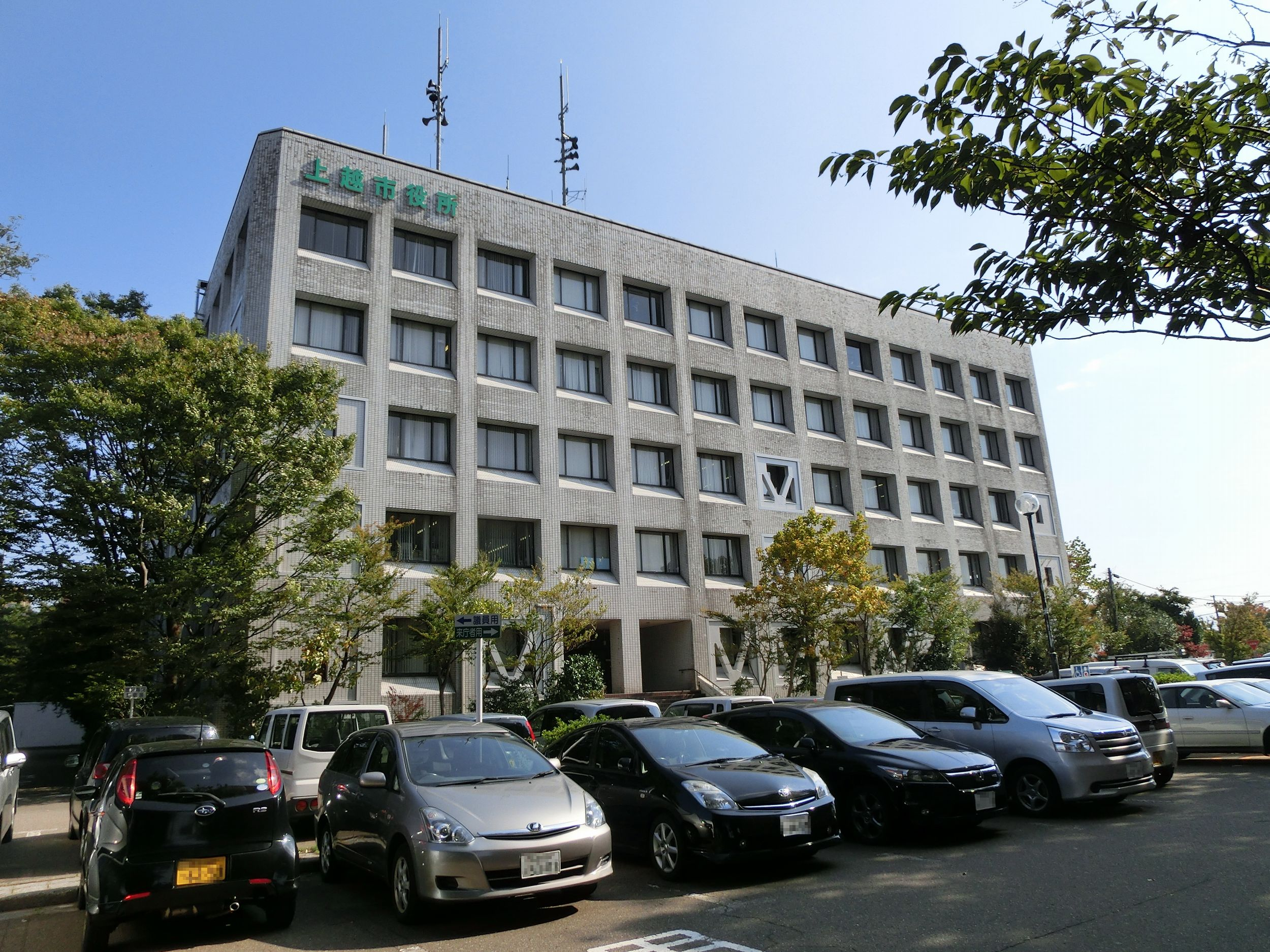
Joetsu City Hall

Jōetsu has a mayor-council form of government with a directly elected mayor and a unicameral city legislature of 32 members. The city contributes five members to the Niigata Prefectural Assembly. In terms of national politics, the city is part of the Niigata at-large district in the upper house of the National Diet of Japan, and Niigata 6th District in the lower house.

== Economy ==
Jōetsu is a regional commercial and industrial centre, with heavy industry concentrated around the port of former Naoetsu, and light manufacturing and commerce around the former Takada area. The Jōetsu Thermal Power Station is an LNG-fired thermal power station operated by JERA in the city.

== Education ==
=== Colleges and universities ===
- Joetsu University of Education is a national university established on October 1, 1978, and specializes in pedagogical training for prospective roles in elementary and secondary education, as well as a focus on child growth and development. Although the university accepts international students, the admission rate hovers between 20 and 30%.
- Niigata College of Nursing

=== Primary and secondary education ===
Jōetsu has 50 public elementary schools and 22 public junior high schools operated by the city government, one public elementary school and one junior high school operated by the national government. The city has eight public high schools, operated by the Niigata Prefectural Board of Education and two private high schools. The prefecture also operates four special education schools.

== Transportation ==
=== Railway ===
– Hokuriku Shinkansen

- Jōetsumyōkō

JR East - Shin'etsu Main Line

- Naoetsu - Kuroi - Saigata - Dosokohama - Katamachi - Jōgehama - Kakizaki

Hokuetsu Express Hokuhoku Line

- Hokuhoku-Ōshima - Mushigawa-Ōsugi - Uragawara - Ōike-Ikoi-no-mori - Saigata

Echigo Tokimeki Railway - Myōkō Haneuma Line

- Nihongi -< Arai - Kita-Arai > - Jōetsumyōkō - Minami-Takada - Takada - Kasugayama - Naoetsu

Echigo Tokimeki Railway - Nihonkai Hisui Line

- Nadachi - Arimagawa - Tanihama - Naoetsu

=== Highway ===
- Hokuriku Expressway
- Jōshin-etsu Expressway
- National Route 8
- National Route 18
- National Route 253
- National Route 350
- National Route 403
- National Route 404
- National Route 405
- National Route 460

=== Ferry ===
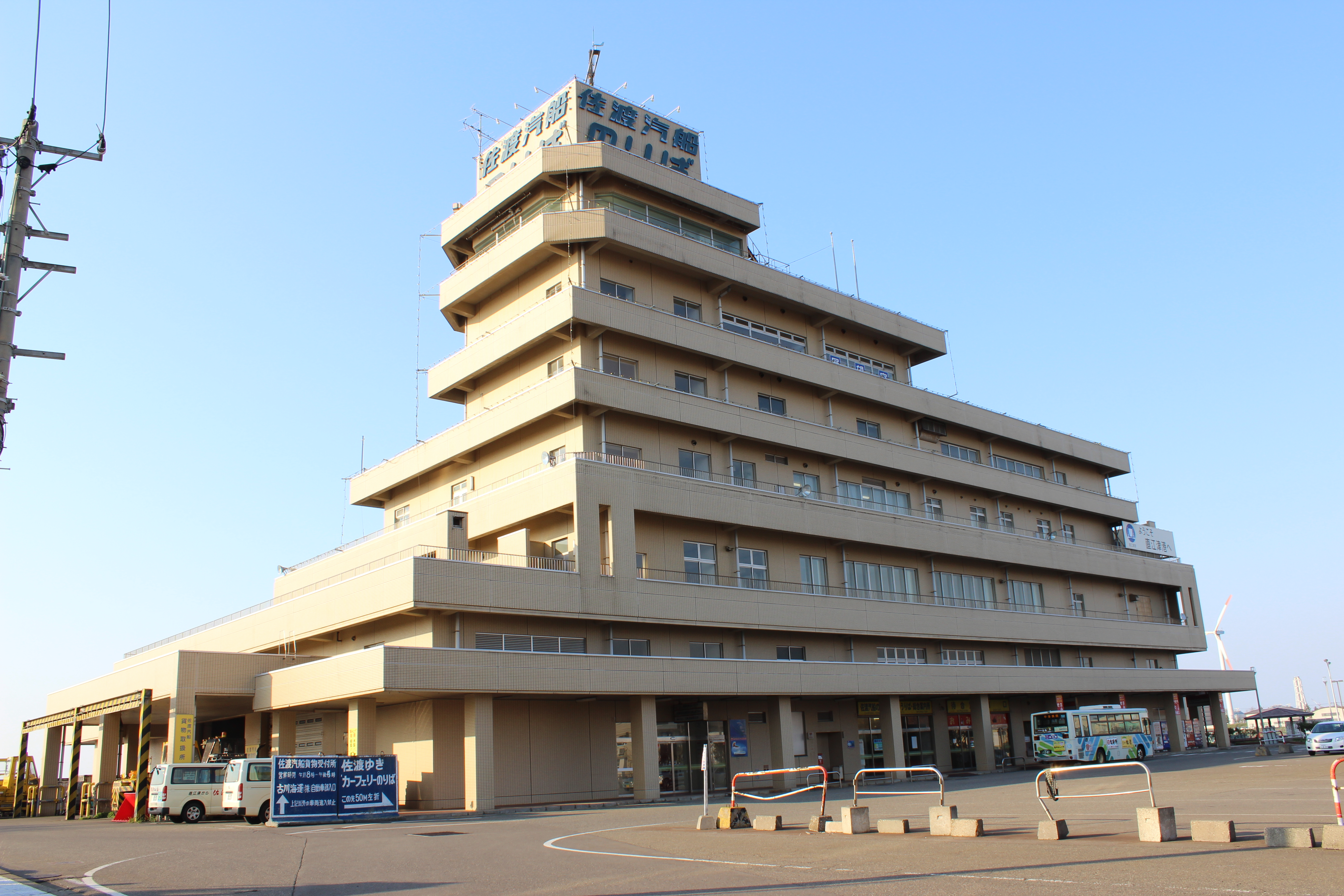
Sado Kisen Naoetsu Terminal

The port of Ogi, on Sado Island, can be accessed by a jetfoil that runs 1-3 times a day from March 1 until November 15.

== Local attractions ==
=== Places of interest ===
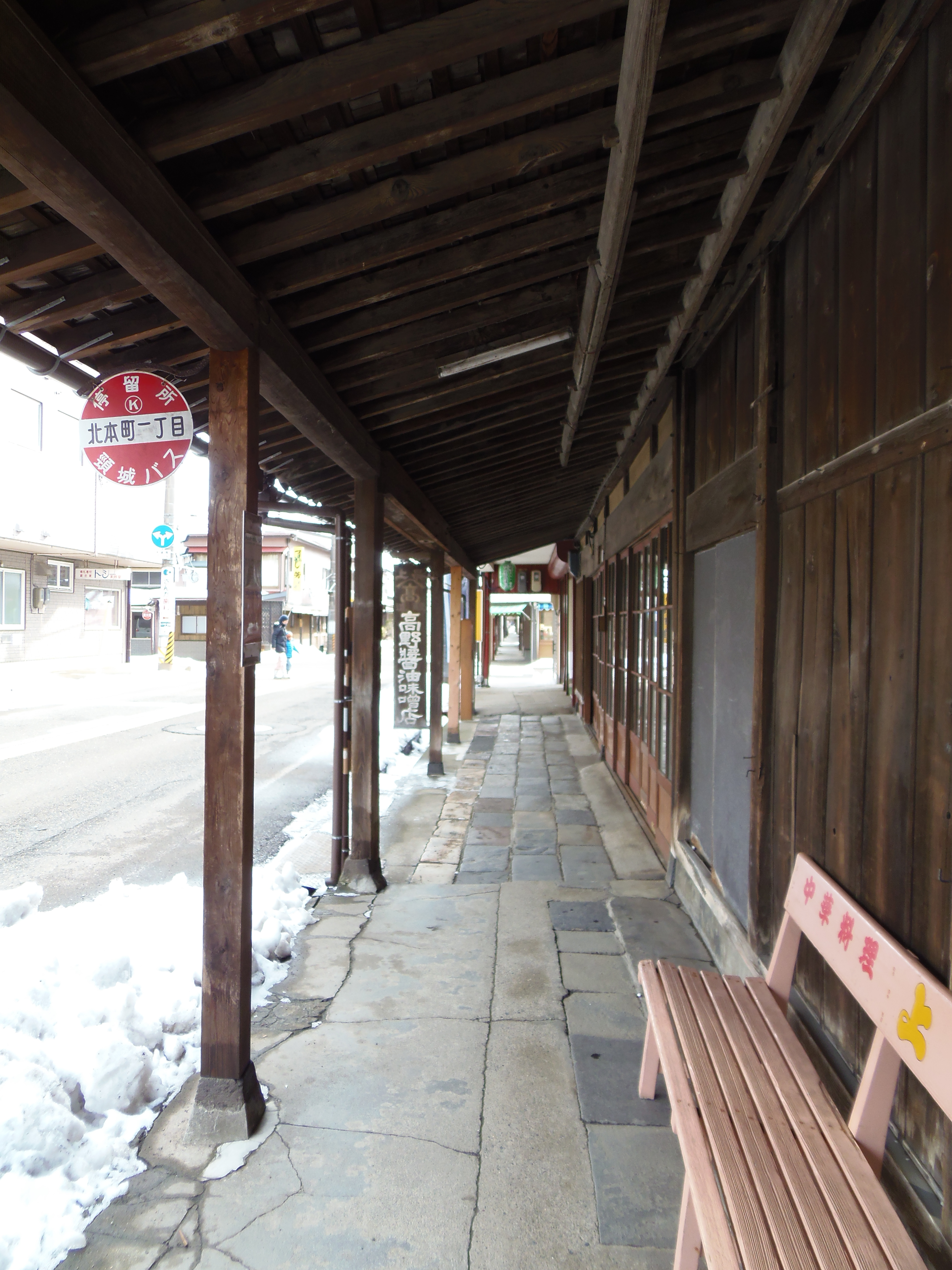
Gangi-dori Street in Takada

- Takada Castle - Three-story turret located in Takada Park
- Johkoh-Ji - The founder of this temple is Shinran, the founder of Jodo Shinshu
- Kota-Jinja - one of the three shrines claiming the title of ichinomiya of former Echigo Province
- Kasugayama Castle - A castle ruin, main castle of Uesugi clan
- Samegao Castle - A castle ruin of Uesugi clan.
- Gangi Dori - 16 km alleyway of wooden eaves built to shelter pedestrians during heavy snowfall
- Awa Ame - oldest candy in Japan
- Iwanohara Vineyard Co., Ltd. - one of the oldest wineries in Japan and birthplace of the grape Muscat Bailey A
- Hida Sites - Yayoi period settlement ruins, National Historic Site
- Izumi Jomon Park - home to ruins from Japan's Jōmon Period

=== Cultural events ===
- Takada Castle Cherry Blossom Festival
- Lerch Festival
- Joetsu Lotus Festival
- Joetsu Festival
- Kenshin Festival
- Echigo Kenshin Sake Festival
- Candle Road

== Sister cities ==
- Hunchun, Yanbian Korean Autonomous Prefecture, Jilin, China
- Lilienfeld, Austria
- Pohang, North Gyeongsang, South Korea

== Notable people ==
- Shinran - Japanese Buddhist monk, and Shinran was defrocked and sent to Echigo.
- Uesugi Kenshin - He was one of the most powerful Daimyō, and ruled Echigo Province in the Sengoku period of Japan.
- Matsudaira Tadateru - He was the sixth son of Tokugawa Ieyasu.
- Theodor von Lerch - a major general in the Austro-Hungarian Army, and a pioneer alpine ski instructor in Japan.
- Chiang Kai-shek - Chiang served in the 13th Division, Imperial Japanese Army.
- Masabumi Hosono - He survived the sinking of the Titanic.
- Maejima Hisoka - politician, businessman, founder of the Japanese Postal System
- Kenkichi Yoshizawa - diplomat
- Kawakami Zenbei - winemaker, founder of Iwanohara Vineyard
- Ogawa Mimei - children's writer
