= Jōetsu Thermal Power Station =

Thermal power station in Jōetsu, Niigata, Japan

Jōetsu Thermal Power Station 上越火力発電所
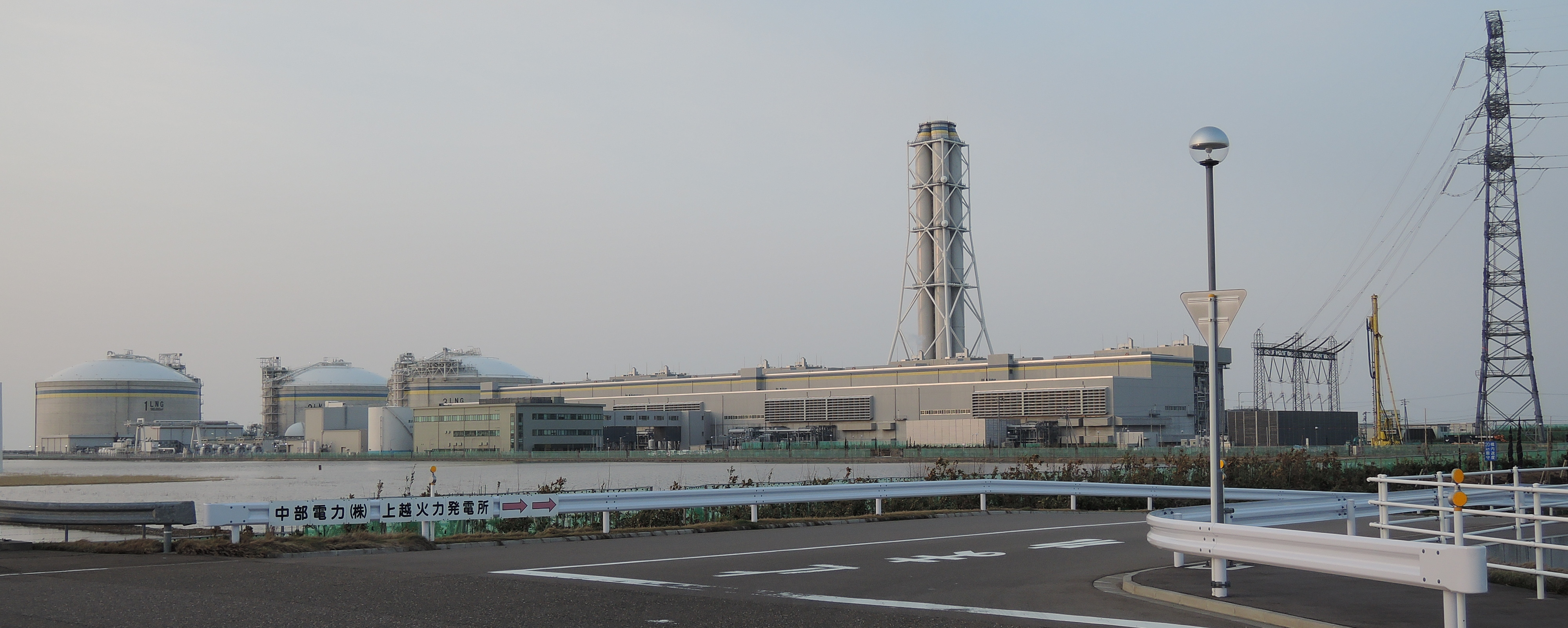
- Jōetsu Thermal Power Station
- Country: Japan
- Location: Jōetsu, Niigata
- Coordinates: 37°12′18.3″N 138°16′36.9″E
- Status: Operational
- Commission date: 2014
- Owner: JERA
- Operator: JERA

Thermal power station
- Primary fuel: LNG

Power generation
- Units operational: 2
- Units under const.: 1
- Nameplate capacity: 2380 MW

Jōetsu Thermal Power Station (上越火力発電所, Jōetsu Karyoku Hatsudensho) is an LNG-fired thermal power station operated by JERA in the city of Jōetsu, Niigata, Japan. The facility is located on reclaimed land on the Sea of Japan.

== History ==
Jōetsu Thermal Power Station was originally a joint project in reclaimed land adjacent to Naoetsu Port by Chubu Electric and Tohoku Electric. However, changes in construction plans and planned output greatly delayed construction, and the Tohoku Electric portion of the project was greatly reduced in scope.

The Chubu Electric portion of the project consists of a multi-shaft 1,300 deg C Advanced combined cycle (ACC) power generation system in which two generators are connected to two gas turbines and one steam turbine, with exhaust heat recovery boiler. Thermal efficiency is 58% or more. The project came on line on July 1, 2012 and was completed by May 15, 2014. In April 2019, the operations of Chubu Electric Power were transferred to JERA, a joint-venture between Chubu Electric and Tokyo Electric. An announcement was made by General Electric (GE) in 2015 that it has received a contract to upgrade the gas turbines at the Jōetsu Thermal Power Station for higher thermal efficiency.

The Tohoku Electric portion of the project is still under construction with an estimated completion date of the end of 2019.

== Plant details ==
| Unit | Type | Fuel | Capacity | On-line | Current Status |
|---|---|---|---|---|---|
| JERA 1-1 | ACC | LNG | 595 MW | 2012 | Operational |
| JERA 1-2 | ACC | LNG | 595 MW | 2013 | Operational |
| JERA 2-1 | ACC | LNG | 595 MW | 2013 | Operational |
| JERA 2-2 | ACC | LNG | 595 MW | 2014 | Operational |
| Tohoku 1 | CC | LNG | 60 MW | - | under construction |

== See also ==
- Energy in Japan
- List of power stations in Japan
