= Kubiki, Niigata =

Dissolved municipality in Niigata prefecture, Japan

Wards in Jōetsu City.

Kubiki (頸城村, Kubiki-mura) was a village located in Nakakubiki District, Niigata Prefecture, Japan.

As of 2003, the village had an estimated population of 9,691 and a density of 252.76 persons per km^{2}. The total area was 38.34 km^{2}.

On January 1, 2005, Kubiki, along with the town of Yasuzuka, the villages of Maki, Ōshima and Uragawara (all from Higashikubiki District), the towns of Itakura, Kakizaki, Ōgata and Yoshikawa, the villages of Kiyosato, Nakagō and Sanwa (all from Nakakubiki District), and the town of Nadachi (from Nishikubiki District), was merged into the expanded city of Jōetsu.
