= Itakura, Niigata =

Dissolved municipality in Niigata prefecture, Japan

Wards in Jōetsu City.

Itakura (板倉町, Itakura-machi) was a town located in Nakakubiki District, Niigata Prefecture, Japan.

As of 2003, the town had an estimated population of 7,526 and a density of 113.16 persons per km^{2}. The total area was 66.51 km^{2}.

On January 1, 2005, Itakura, along with the town of Yasuzuka, the villages of Maki, Ōshima and Uragawara (all from Higashikubiki District), the towns of Kakizaki, Ōgata and Yoshikawa, the villages of Kiyosato, Kubiki, Nakagō and Sanwa (all from Nakakubiki District), and the town of Nadachi (from Nishikubiki District), was merged into the expanded city of Jōetsu.
