= Myōkō, Niigata (village) =

Dissolved municipality in Niigata prefecture Japan

Myōkō (妙高村, Myōkō-mura) was a village located in Nakakubiki District, Niigata Prefecture, Japan.

As of 2003, the village had an estimated population of 4,918 and a density of 34.92 persons per km^{2}. The total area was 140.82 km^{2}.

On April 1, 2005, Myōkō, along with the town of Myōkōkōgen (also from Nakakubiki District), was merged into the expanded city of Arai. Arai changed its name to Myōkō City at the same time.
