= Yasuzuka, Niigata =

Yasuzuka 安塚町
- Former municipality
- Flag Seal
- Interactive map of Yasuzuka
- Country: Japan
- Region: Hokuriku
- Prefecture: Niigata Prefecture
- District: Higashikubiki District
- Merged: January 1, 2005 (now part of Jōetsu)

Area
  - Total: 70.23 km^{2} (27.12 sq mi)

Population (2003)
  - Total: 3,521
- Time zone: UTC+09:00 (JST)

Wards in Jōetsu City.

Yasuzuka (安塚町, Yasuzaka-machi) was a town located in Higashikubiki District, Niigata Prefecture, Japan.

As of 2003, the town had an estimated population of 3,521 and a density of 50.14 persons per km^{2}. The total area was 70.23 km^{2}.

On January 1, 2005, Yasuzuka, along with the villages of Maki, Ōshima and Uragawara (all from Higashikubiki District), the towns of Itakura, Kakizaki, Ōgata and Yoshikawa, the villages of Kiyosato, Kubiki, Nakagō and Sanwa (all from Nakakubiki District), and the town of Nadachi (from Nishikubiki District), was merged into the expanded city of Jōetsu.

== Transportation ==
=== Highway ===
- National Route 403
- National Route 405

== See also ==
- Jōetsu, Niigata
