= Ōshima, Niigata =

Oshima 大島村
- Former municipality
- Flag Seal
- Interactive map of Oshima
- Country: Japan
- Region: Hokuriku
- Prefecture: Niigata Prefecture
- District: Higashikubiki District
- Merged: January 1, 2005 (now part of Jōetsu)

Area
  - Total: 71.64 km^{2} (27.66 sq mi)

Population (2003)
  - Total: 2,312
- Time zone: UTC+09:00 (JST)

Wards in Jōetsu City.

Ōshima (大島村, Ōshima-mura) was a village located in Higashikubiki District, Niigata Prefecture, Japan.

As of 2003, the village had an estimated population of 2,312 and a density of 32.27 persons per km^{2}. The total area was 71.64 km^{2}.

On January 1, 2005, Ōshima, along with the town of Yasuzuka, the villages of Maki and Uragawara (all from Higashikubiki District), the towns of Itakura, Kakizaki, Ōgata and Yoshikawa, the villages of Kiyosato, Kubiki, Nakagō and Sanwa (all from Nakakubiki District), and the town of Nadachi (from Nishikubiki District), was merged into the expanded city of Jōetsu.

Since the merger, the village has been Ōshima-ku (大島区), a subdivision of Jōetsu City.

== Transportation ==
=== Railway ===
Hokuetsu Express Hokuhoku Line

- Hokuhoku-Ōshima

=== Highway ===
- National Route 253
- National Route 403

== See also ==
- Jōetsu, Niigata
