= Ōmi, Niigata =

Dissolved municipality in Niigata prefecture, Japan

Ōmi (青海町, Ōmi-machi) was a town located in Nishikubiku District, Niigata Prefecture, Japan.

== Overview ==
Ōmi was located on the Japan Sea coast, about four hundred kilometres north-west of Tokyo. The town also had two additional neighborhoods, Oyashirazu and Ichiburi, located six kilometres and thirteen kilometres respectively further down the coast from the main part of Ōmi.

On March 19, 2005, Ōmi, along with the town of Nō (also from Nishikubiki District), was merged into the expanded city of Itoigawa.

== Demographics ==
The town was a classic case of rural decline now often found in modern Japan. Over a period of 30 years, the population had decreased from around 17,000 to 9,797 as of 2003, with a population density of 75.87 persons per km^{2}. The total area was 129.13 km^{2}. After graduating from high school, many young people are forced to move to major population centres for university or in search of work. This was reflected in the population, with the majority of residents aged over 35. Concurrently the number of students attending Ōmi Junior High School fell from 568 to below 300 over a period of 20 years.

Ōmi had many well-funded facilities, including regular local bus and train services (but only a few long-distance services), an indoor heated pool, gymnasium, baseball field, several small local parks, mountain camping sites, plus a new natural history museum, library, and performance hall seating 500 people.

However, there were only a few small local shops, supermarkets and restaurants, and no entertainment facilities. With the declining population many such facilities (such as the movie theatre and baseball stadium) were closed and demolished in recent years.

== Travel information ==
Ōmi — The temple and park above Ōmi Kindergarten are quite pretty with a good view of the town. There is also a natural history museum at Kirara Ōmi Hall near the train station. Apart from these the only other real attractions are the nearby mountains and beach where one can go fossicking for jade washed down from Hisui Gorge in the nearby mountains.

Oyashirazu — An old village with many older houses. It is a popular beach during summer with some beer stalls, plus a "Sunset Station" (Pier Park) and shops.

Ichiburi — This is a quaint little fishing village with still many signs of old Japan.

== Festivals ==
Ōmi no take no karakai is a traditional New Years event that has been carried out since the Edo period (1603–1867). The event is performed in competition between the Eastern area of the town and the Western side. It begins with "Omatsutori" on January 7, where the two sides try to compete over kazaritake (ornamental bamboo) and two bamboos (isamitake and awasetake) tell the fortune regarding any bumper crop. The isamitake and awasetake activities, where bamboo branches are hooked and pulled, are joined in by young and old alike while the audience cheers. Although it is said that there used to be a few similar examples of this kind of New Years event in Japan, this one in Ōmi is the only remaining one. This event was designated a National Important Intangible Folk Cultural Property on December 28, 1987.

== Sister city relationship ==
- (Japan) Yamagata, Nagano
