= Nakakubiki District, Niigata =

Former district in Niigata Prefecture, Japan

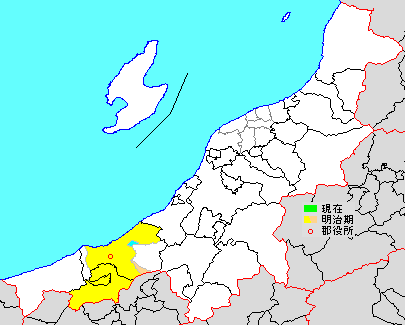
Map showing original extent of Nakakubiki District in Niigata Prefecture: * yellow - areas formerly within the district borders during the early Meiji period

Nakakubiki (中頸城郡, Nakakubiki-gun) was a district located in Niigata, Japan.

As of 2003, the district had an estimated population of 70,229 with a density of 104.35 persons per km^{2}. The total area was 673.01 km^{2}.

== Municipalities ==
Before its dissolution, the district consisted of five towns and five villages:

- Itakura (Note: Classified as a town.)
- Kakizaki
- Kiyosato (Note: Classified as a village.)
- Kubiki
- Myōkō
- Myōkōkōgen
- Nakagō
- Ōgata
- Sanwa
- Yoshikawa

== History ==
The district was founded in 1878, when the former Kubiki District split into Higashikubiki District, Nakakubiki District, and Nishikubiki District. At the time of founding, the district covered most of the city of Jōetsu (excluding the sections of Yasuzuka, Utakawa, Ōshima and Maki from Higashikubiki District, and the section of Nadachi from Nishikubiki District), the city of Myōkō, and parts of the city of Kashiwazaki (the areas of Agewa (Kamiwa), Takaze (Takahane) and Warabino from the former municipality of Kakizaki). The district seat was located at the village of Takagi (now the city of Jōetsu).

=== District Timeline ===
- In 1911 - The town of Takada was elevated to city status.
- On June 1, 1954 - Both the cities of Naoetsu and Arai were founded by merging with other municipalities.

=== Recent mergers ===
- On January 1, 2005 - The towns of Itakura, Kakizaki, Ōgata and Yoshikawa, and the villages of Kiyosato, Kubiki, Nakagō and Sanwa, along with the town of Yasuzuka, the villages of Maki, Ōshima and Uragawara (all from Higashikubiki District), and the town of Nadachi (from Nishikubiki District), were merged into the expanded city of Jōetsu.
- On April 1, 2005 - The town of Myōkōkōgen, and the village of Myōkō were absorbed into the expanded city of Arai and was later renamed the city to Myōkō at the same time. Therefore, Nakakubiki District was dissolved as a result of this merger.

== See also ==
- List of dissolved districts of Japan
