= Nadachi, Niigata =

Dissolved municipality in Niigata prefecture, Japan

Wards in Jōetsu City.

Nadachi (名立町, Nadachi-machi) was a town located in Nishikubiki District, Niigata Prefecture, Japan.

As of 2003, the town had an estimated population of 3,229 and a density of 48.97 persons per km^{2}. The total area was 65.94 km^{2}.

On January 1, 2005, Nadachi, along with the town of Yasuzuka, the villages of Maki, Ōshima and Uragawara (all from Higashikubiki District), the towns of Itakura, Kakizaki, Ōgata and Yoshikawa, and the villages of Kiyosato, Kubiki, Nakagō and Sanwa (all from Nakakubiki District), was merged into the expanded city of Jōetsu.
