= Myōkōkōgen, Niigata =

Dissolved municipality in Niigata prefecture, Japan

Myōkōkōgen (妙高高原町, Myōkōkōgen-machi) was a town in Nakakubiki District, Niigata Prefecture, Japan

In 1916, Myōkō Kōgen became nationally famous when it came first in a vote taken to find the most popular summer resort in Japan.

The area is dominated by 'Hokushingogaku' - a series of five mountains (Madarao, Myōkō, Kurohime, Togakushi and Iizuna) that make up the border of Nagano and Niigata prefectures. Mt. Myoko 妙高山 is listed as one of the hundred most famous mountains in Japan with its summit recorded as 2,454 meters above sea level.

As of 2003, the town had an estimated population of 6,234 and a population density of 48.49 persons per km^{2}. The total area was 128.57 km^{2}.

On April 1, 2005, Myōkōkōgen, along with the former village of Myōkō (also from Nakakubiki District), was merged into the expanded city of Arai. Arai changed its name to Myōkō City at the same time.

== Activities ==
Myōkō Kōgen is famed for its ski resorts which were founded in the 1930s, making it one of the oldest established ski areas in the world. It is also a traditional mountain retreat of Japan's imperial family. The area includes nine mountain resorts: the main resorts of Akakura Onsen, Akakura Kanko Resort (also known as Akakan), Ikenotaira Onsen, Myōkō Suginohara (which boasts the longest ski run in Japan), the smaller Seki Onsen, Kyukamura RunRun and Myōkō Ski Park, and two resorts just over the border in Nagano: Madarao Kogen and Tangram Ski Circus.

Myōkō Kōgen is also well known for its many local onsen (hot springs) emanating from the Jigoku-dani valley between Mt. Myoko and Mt. Maeyama
