= Nishikubiki District, Niigata =

Former district in Niigata prefecture, Japan

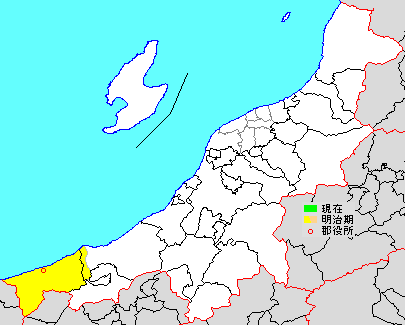
Map showing original extent of Nishikubiki District in Niigata Prefecture: * yellow - areas formerly within the district borders during the early Meiji period

Nishikubiki (西頸城郡, Nishikubiki-gun) was a district located in Niigata Prefecture, Japan that was dissolved in 2005.

As of 2003, the district had an estimated population of 23,292 with a density of 67.40 persons per km^{2}. The total area was 345.56 km^{2}.

== Municipalities ==
Prior to its dissolution, the district consisted of three towns:

- Nadachi (Note: Classified as a town.)
- Nō
- Ōmi

== History ==
The district was founded in 1878, when the former Kubiki District was split into Higashikubiki District, Nakakubiki District, and Nishikubiki District. At the time of founding, the district covered the city of Itoigawa and the Nadachi section of the city of Jōetsu. The district seat was located at the town of Itoigawa (now the city of Itoigawa).

=== District Timeline ===
- On April 1, 1954 - The former town of Itoigawa absorbed the villages of Uramoto, Shimohayakawa, Kamihayakawa, Yamatogawa, Saikai, Ōno (Daino), Nechi and Kotati (Otaki) to create the city of Itoigawa.

=== Recent mergers ===
- On January 1, 2005 - The town of Nadachi, along with the town of Yasuzuka, the villages of Maki, Ōshima and Uragawara (all from Higashikubiki District), the towns of Itakura, Kakizaki, Ōgata and Yoshikawa, and the villages of Kiyosato, Kubiki, Nakagō and Sanwa (all from Nakakubiki District), was merged into the expanded city of Jōetsu.
- On March 19, 2005 - The towns of Nō and Ōmi were merged into the expanded city of Itoigawa. Therefore, Nishikubiki District was dissolved as a result of this merger.
