= Myōkō, Niigata =

Myōkō 妙高市
- City
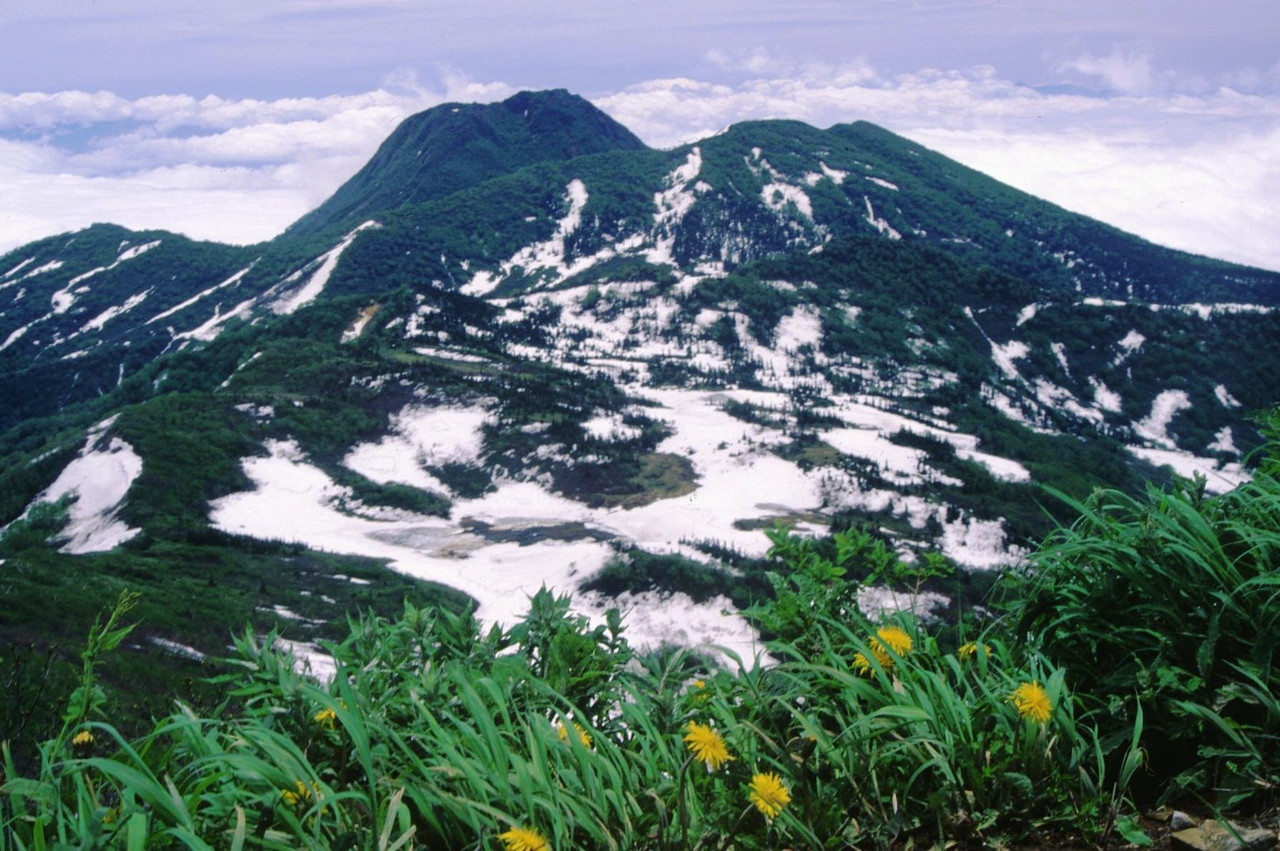
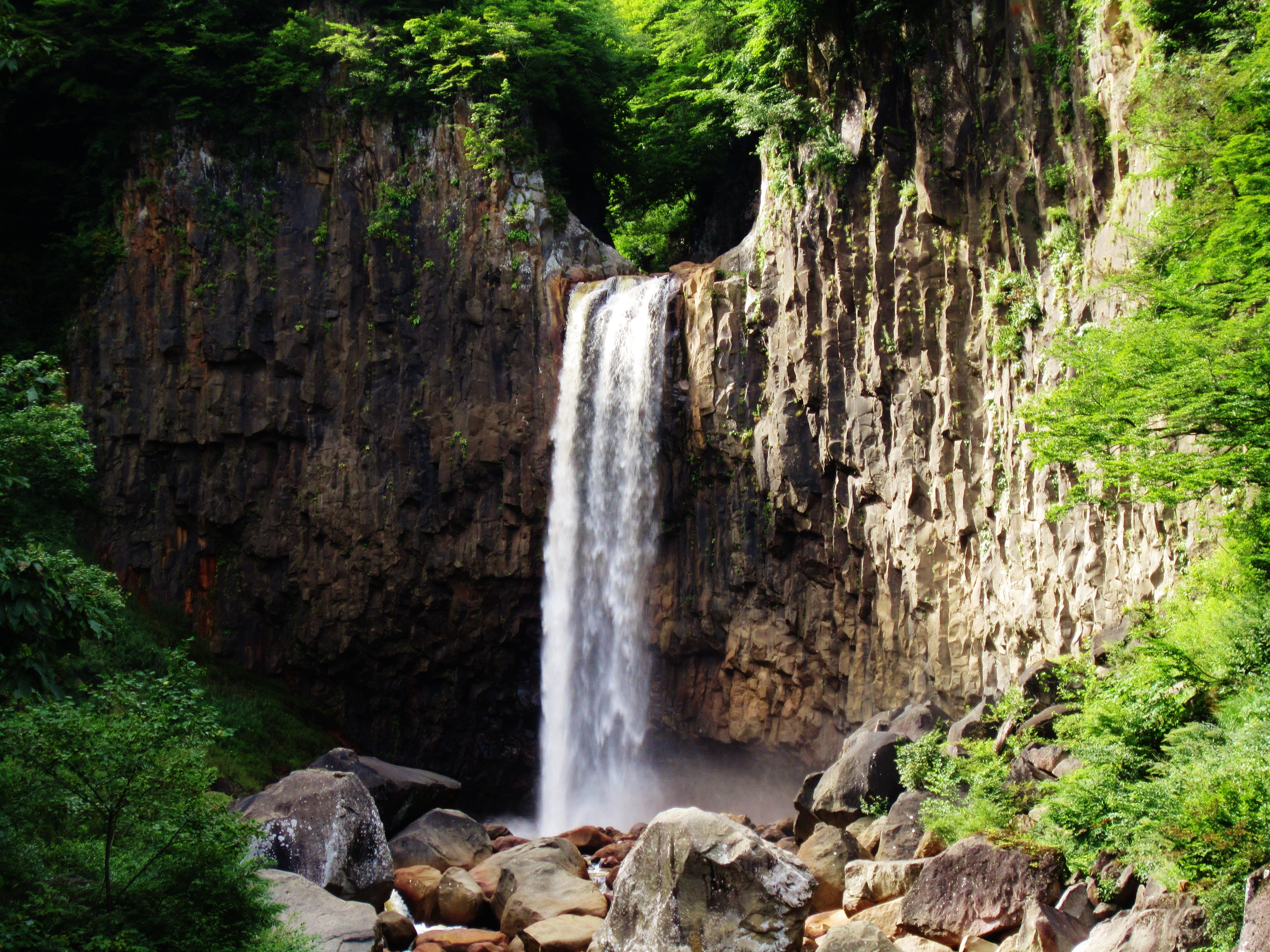
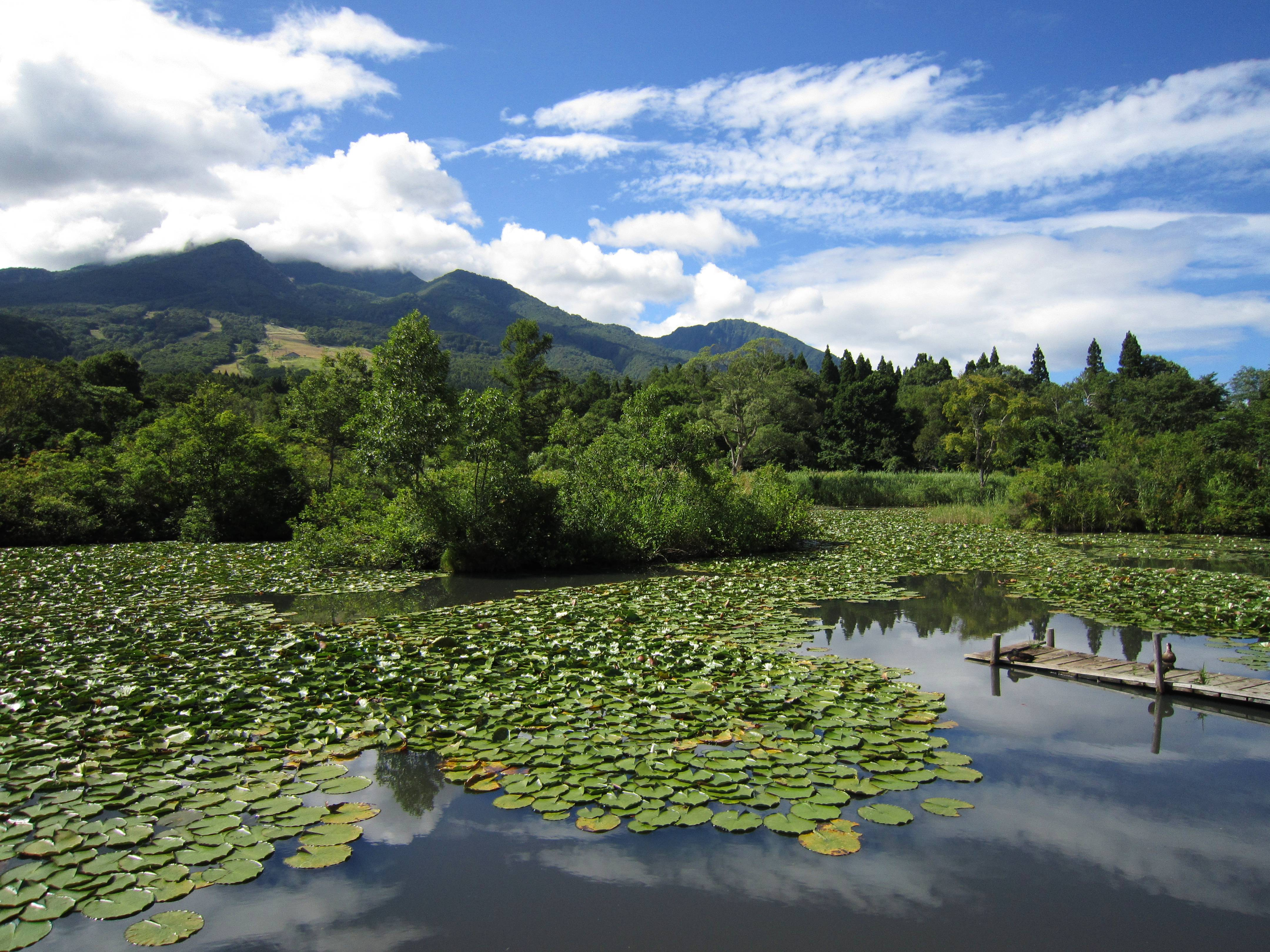
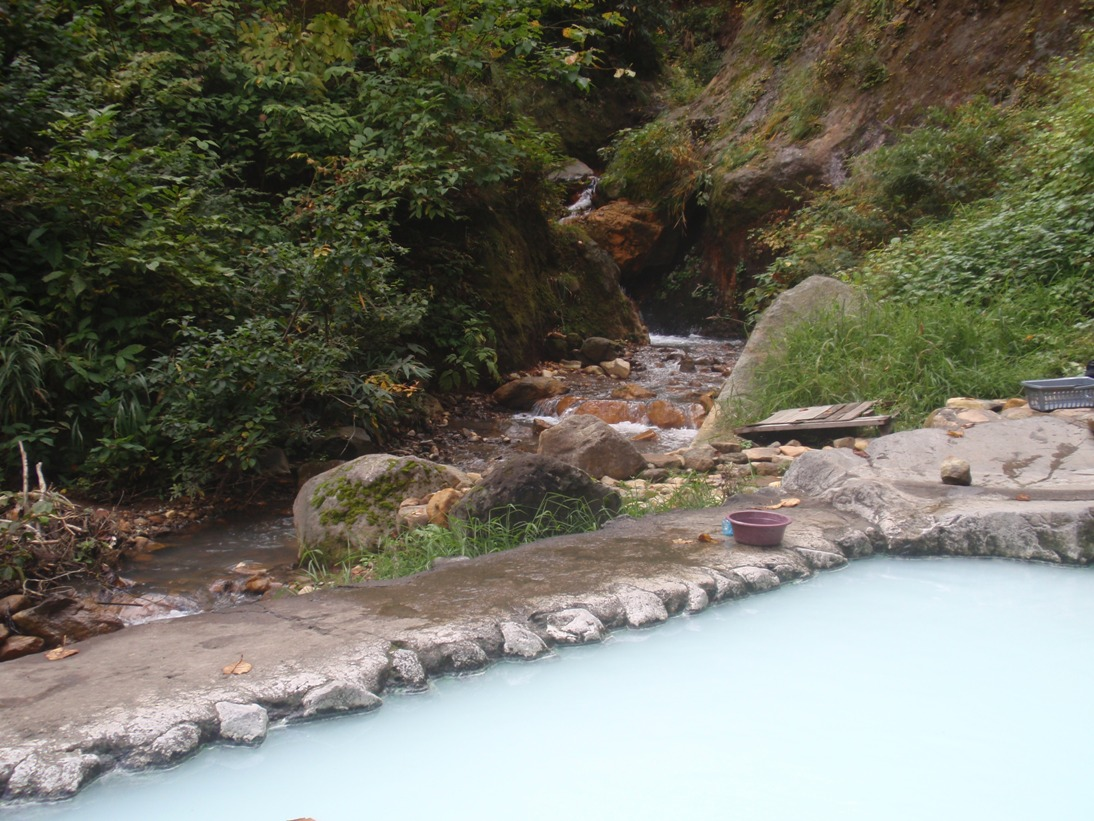
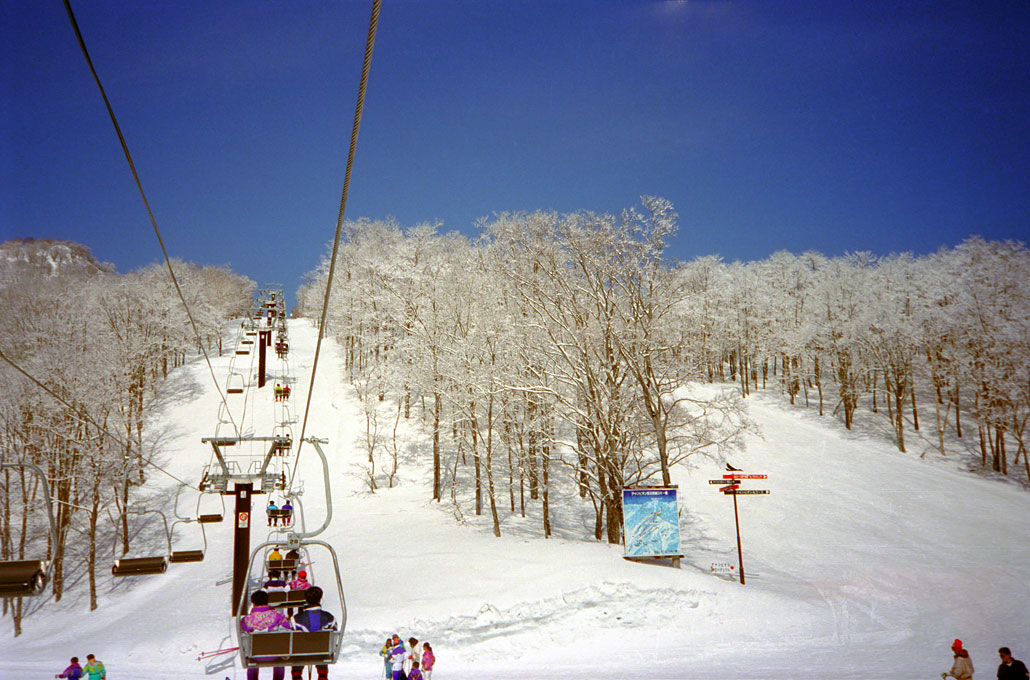
- Mount Myōkō Naena Falls Imori Pond Tsubame Spa Akakura Onsen Ski Area

- Flag Seal

- Location of Myōkō in Niigata

- Coordinates: 37°1′30.7″N 138°15′12.7″E
- Country: Japan
- Region: Chūbu (Kōshin'etsu) (Hokuriku)
- Prefecture: Niigata
- First official recorded: 2rd AD (official estimated)
- Former Arai city settled: November 1, 1954
- Myokō settled: April 1, 2005

Government
  - Mayor: Yōji Kido（城戸陽二） - from October 2022

Area
  - Total: 445.63 km^{2} (172.06 sq mi)

Population (November 1, 2020)
  - Total: 31,374
  - Density: 70.404/km^{2} (182.34/sq mi)
- Time zone: UTC+9 (Japan Standard Time)
- Phone number: 0255-72-5111
- Address: 5-1 Sakaemachi, Myoko-shi, Niigata-ken 944-8686
- Climate: Cfa
- Website: Official website
- Symbols
- Bird: Blue-and-white flycatcher
- Flower: Glaucidium palmatum
- Tree: Fagus crenata

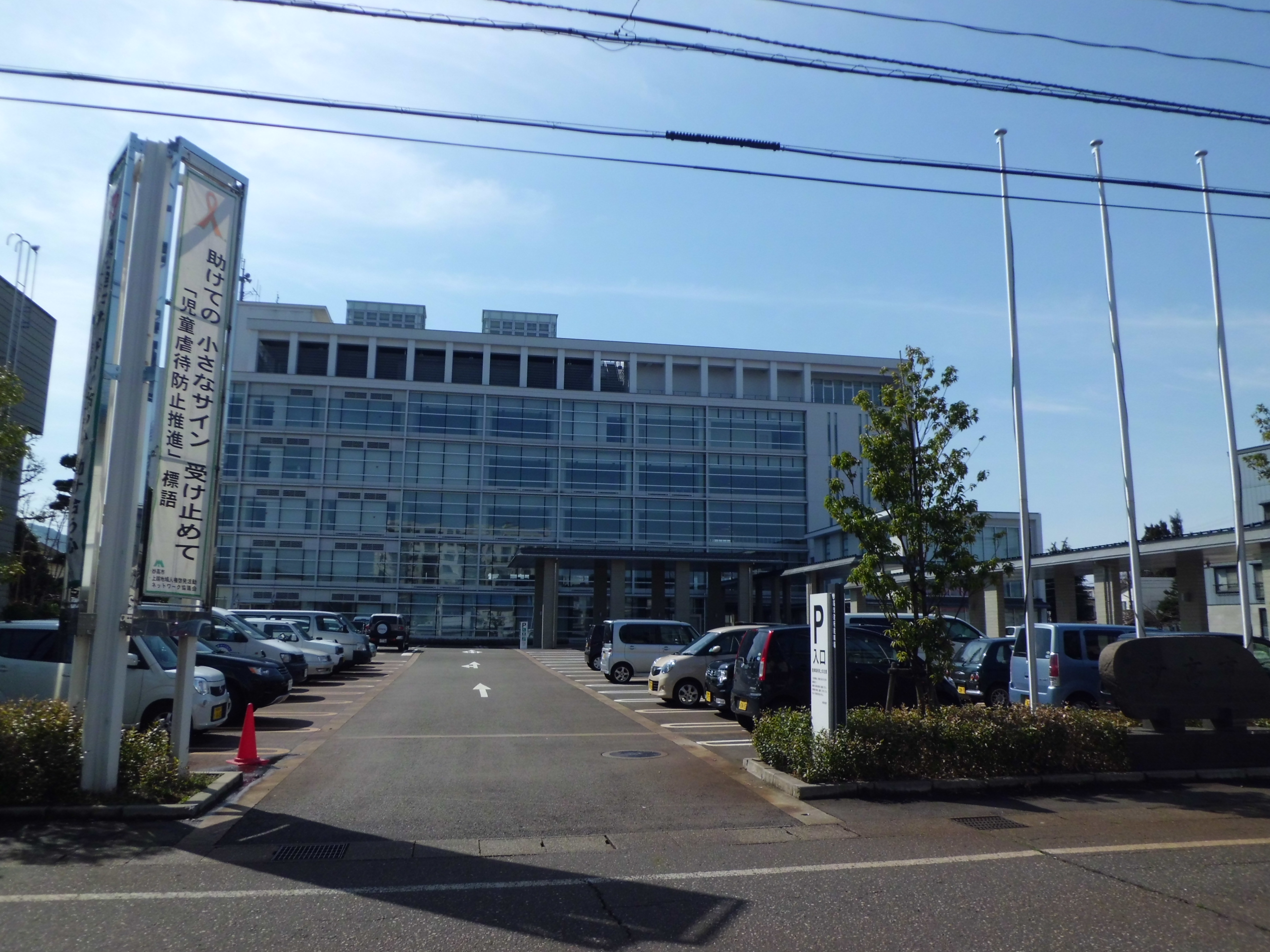
Myōkō City Hall

Myōkō (妙高市, Myōkō-shi) is a city located in Niigata Prefecture, Japan. As of 1 November 2020, the city had an estimated population of 31,374 in 12,408 households, and a population density of 70 people per km^{2}. The total area of the city was 445.63 square kilometres (172.06 sq mi). Myōkō is a member of the World Health Organization’s Alliance for Healthy Cities (AFHC).

== Geography ==
Myōkō is located in an inland region of north-central Niigata Prefecture, on the border of Nagano Prefecture. It lies in mountain surroundings near the historical entrance to the Echigo Plains. The city is surrounded by five mountains. Mount Madarao, Mount Myōkō, Mount Kurohime, Mount Togakushi and Mount Iizuna are collectively known as the Five Mountains of Northern Shinshu (北信五岳, Hokushingogaku). They make up the border of Nagano and Niigata Prefectures. Most of the city is covered with mountains and forests. As the city name implies, Mount Myōkō (2,454 metres; 8,051 ft) is in the city, much of which is within the borders of the Myōkō-Togakushi Renzan National Park. In addition to its namesake, Mount Myōkō, the city is home to two other 100 Famous Japanese Mountains: Mount Hiuchi (2,462 m; 8,077 ft) and Mount Takatsuma (2,353 m; 7,720 ft).

=== Surrounding municipalities ===
- Nagano Prefecture
  - Iiyama
  - Nagano
  - Otari
  - Shinano
- Niigata Prefecture
  - Itoigawa
  - Jōetsu

== Climate ==
Myōkō has a humid subtropical climate (Köppen Cfa) characterized by warm, wet summers and cold winters with heavy snowfall. The average annual temperature in Myōkō is 11.9 °C (53.4 °F). The average annual rainfall is 1,924.4 mm (75.76 in) with September as the wettest month. The temperatures are highest on average in August, at around 24.4 °C (75.9 °F), and lowest in January, at around 0.0 °C (32.0 °F).

Climate data for Sekiyama, Myōkō (1991–2020 normals, extremes 1978–present)
Month	Jan	Feb	Mar	Apr	May	Jun	Jul	Aug	Sep	Oct	Nov	Dec	Year
Record high °C (°F)	15.2 (59.4)	17.8 (64.0)	25.9 (78.6)	29.6 (85.3)	30.4 (86.7)	33.8 (92.8)	34.1 (93.4)	35.5 (95.9)	34.3 (93.7)	30.1 (86.2)	24.4 (75.9)	22.8 (73.0)	35.5 (95.9)
Mean daily maximum °C (°F)	3.3 (37.9)	3.9 (39.0)	7.8 (46.0)	15.0 (59.0)	20.7 (69.3)	23.4 (74.1)	27.1 (80.8)	28.6 (83.5)	24.6 (76.3)	18.8 (65.8)	12.9 (55.2)	6.6 (43.9)	16.1 (61.0)
Daily mean °C (°F)	0.0 (32.0)	0.3 (32.5)	3.4 (38.1)	9.8 (49.6)	15.6 (60.1)	19.3 (66.7)	23.2 (73.8)	24.4 (75.9)	20.3 (68.5)	14.5 (58.1)	8.5 (47.3)	2.9 (37.2)	11.9 (53.4)
Mean daily minimum °C (°F)	−2.7 (27.1)	−3.0 (26.6)	−0.3 (31.5)	5.0 (41.0)	11.0 (51.8)	15.7 (60.3)	20.1 (68.2)	21.1 (70.0)	16.9 (62.4)	10.9 (51.6)	4.9 (40.8)	−0.1 (31.8)	8.3 (46.9)
Record low °C (°F)	−10.5 (13.1)	−10.0 (14.0)	−7.9 (17.8)	−5.1 (22.8)	1.1 (34.0)	7.8 (46.0)	12.5 (54.5)	12.8 (55.0)	7.0 (44.6)	1.7 (35.1)	−2.9 (26.8)	−7.1 (19.2)	−10.5 (13.1)
Average precipitation mm (inches)	284.2 (11.19)	178.6 (7.03)	127.8 (5.03)	74.2 (2.92)	81.4 (3.20)	118.6 (4.67)	179.9 (7.08)	150.0 (5.91)	160.8 (6.33)	151.9 (5.98)	142.5 (5.61)	256.6 (10.10)	1,924.4 (75.76)
Average snowfall cm (inches)	385 (152)	291 (115)	159 (63)	18 (7.1)	0 (0)	0 (0)	0 (0)	0 (0)	0 (0)	0 (0)	12 (4.7)	220 (87)	1,061 (418)
Average precipitation days (≥ 1.0 mm)	22.4	18.2	17.6	11.6	10.8	12.4	14.9	12.5	13.0	13.0	15.2	19.7	182.0
Mean monthly sunshine hours	58.1	76.5	110.4	163.4	192.3	131.1	122.1	161.0	114.5	119.2	102.2	71.0	1,430.5
Source: Japan Meteorological Agency (1991–2020 normals, extremes 1978–present)

== Demographics ==
Per Japanese census data, the population of Myōkō has declined steadily over the past 60 years.

Historical population
Year	Pop.	±%
1960	49,859	—
1970	44,158	−11.4%
1980	41,980	−4.9%
1990	41,072	−2.2%
2000	39,699	−3.3%
2010	35,457	−10.7%
2020	30,383	−14.3%

== History ==
The area of present-day Myōkō was part of ancient Echigo Province. During the Edo period the area was divided between the holdings of Takada Domain and tenryō territory administered directly by the Tokugawa shogunate. With the creation of the modern municipalities system on June 26, 1890, the village of Arai was created within Nakakubiki District, Niigata. Arai was raised to town status on September 9, 1892 and to city status on November 1, 1954. The city of Myōkō was created on April 1, 2005, by the merger of the city of Arai with the town of Myōkōkōgen, and the village of Myōkō (both from Nakakubiki District).

== Economy ==
The economy of Myōkō is dependent on seasonal tourism, agriculture and forestry, and light manufacturing.

== Government ==
Myōkō has a mayor-council form of government with a directly elected mayor and a unicameral city legislature of 18 members. Myōkō contributes one member to the Niigata Prefectural Assembly. In terms of national politics, the city is part of Niigata 6th district of the lower house of the Diet of Japan.

== Education ==
Myōkō has nine public elementary schools and three public middle schools operated by the city government, and one public high school operated by the Niigata Prefectural Board of Education. The prefecture also operates one special education school for the handicapped.

== Transportation ==
=== Railway ===
– Hokuriku Shinkansen

- Jōetsumyōkō^{A}

Echigo Tokimeki Railway - Myōkō Haneuma Line

- Myōkō-Kōgen - Sekiyama - <Nihongi> - Arai - Kita-Arai

Shinano Railway - Kita-Shinano Line

- Myōkō-Kōgen

=== Highway ===
- Jōshin-etsu Expressway – Myōkō IC
- National Route 18
- National Route 292

^{A} Note: Jōetsumyōkō station is actually in Jōetsu, 1.5 km away from the border with Myōkō.

== Local attractions ==
Myōkō Kōgen and the former village of Myōkō are famed for their ski resorts. The first of these, Akakura, was founded in the 1930s, making it one of the oldest established ski areas in the world. It is also a traditional mountain retreat of Japan's imperial family. The Myōkō Ski Area has nine main mountain resorts: Myōkō Akakura, Ikenotaira Onsen, Myōkō Suginohara (which boasts the longest ski run in Japan), Seki Onsen, Kyukamura, Myōkō Ski Park, Lotte Arai Resort, Madarao Kogen and Tangram Ski Circus.

In November 2023, Singaporean real estate investment firm Patience Capital Group acquired the Myōkō Suginohara Ski Resort and outsourced its operations to Seibu Holdings. The company plans to invest 200 billion yen over 10 years to transform Myōkō Kōgen into a year-round tourist destination, attracting several luxury hotels. Some locals, however, fear that Myōkō's skyrocketing real estate prices will lead to higher taxes and increased cost of living, turning Myōkō into a resort similar to Niseko.

- Myōkō Kōgen is also well known for its many local onsen (hot springs) emanating from the Jigoku-dani valley between Mts. Myōkō and Mae.
- Kannondaira-Tenjindō Kofun Group is a Kofun period National Historic Site
- Kanzuri, a traditional fermented condiment, is made in Myōkō.
- Samegao Castle, ruins of a Sengoku period castle and National Historic Site
- Hida Sites, Yayoi period archaeological site and National Historic Site

== Sister cities ==
Myōkō is twinned with:

- Slovenj Gradec, Slovenia
- Zermatt, Switzerland
- Schruns, Tschagguns, originally with Myōkō, Niigata (village) in 2004, Austria
