= Higashikubiki District, Niigata =

Former district in Niigata prefecture, Japan

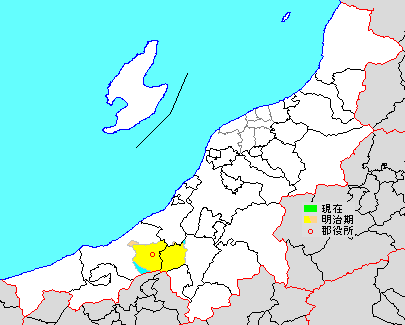
Map showing original extent of Higashikubiki District in Niigata Prefecture: * yellow - areas formerly within the district borders during the early Meiji period

Higashikubiki (東頸城郡, Higashikubiki-gun) was a district located in Niigata, Japan.

As of 2003, the district had an estimated population of 19,638 with a density of 45.60 persons per km^{2}. The total area was 430.64 km^{2}.

== Municipalities ==
Prior to its dissolution, the district consisted of three towns and three villages:

- Maki (Note: Classified as a village.)
- Matsudai (Note: Classified as a town.)
- Matsunoyama
- Ōshima
- Uragawara
- Yasuzuka

== History ==
The district was founded when the former Kubiki District split into Higashikubiki District, Nakakubiki District, and Nishikubiki District. At the time of founding, the district covered the eastern portion of the city of Jōetsu (the sections of Maki, Ōshima, Uragawara and Yasuzuka) and the western portion of the city of Tōkamachi (the sections of Matsudai and Matsunoyama).

=== Recent mergers ===
- On January 1, 2005 - The town of Yasuzuka, and the villages of Maki, Ōshima and Uragawara, along with the towns of Itakura, Kakizaki, Ōgata and Yoshikawa, the villages of Kiyosato, Kubiki, Nakagō and Sanwa (all from Nakakubiki District), and the town of Nadachi (from Nishikubiki District), were merged into the expanded city of Jōetsu.
- On April 1, 2005 - The towns of Matsudai and Matsunoyama, along with the town of Kawanishi, and the village of Nakasato (both from Nakauonuma District), were merged into the expanded city of Tōkamachi. Therefore, Higashikubiki District was dissolved as a result of this merger.

== See also ==
- List of dissolved districts of Japan
