= Uragawara, Niigata =

Uragawara 浦川原村
- Former municipality
- Flag Seal
- Interactive map of Uragawara
- Country: Japan
- Region: Hokuriku
- Prefecture: Niigata Prefecture
- District: Higashikubiki District
- Merged: January 1, 2005 (now part of Jōetsu)

Area
  - Total: 50.64 km^{2} (19.55 sq mi)

Population (2003)
  - Total: 4,095
- Time zone: UTC+09:00 (JST)

Wards in Jōetsu City.

Uragawara (浦川原村, Uragawara-mura) was a village located in Higashikubiki District, Niigata Prefecture, Japan.

As of 2003, the village had an estimated population of 4,095 and a density of 80.86 persons per km^{2}. The total area was 50.64 km^{2}.

On January 1, 2005, Uragawara, along with the town of Yasuzuka, the villages of Maki and Ōshima (all from Higashikubiki District), the towns of Itakura, Kakizaki, Ōgata and Yoshikawa, the villages of Kiyosato, Kubiki, Nakagō and Sanwa (all from Nakakubiki District), and the town of Nadachi (from Nishikubiki District), was merged into the expanded city of Jōetsu.

== Transportation ==
=== Railway ===
Hokuetsu Express Hokuhoku Line

- Uragawara - Mushigawa-Ōsugi

=== Highway ===
- National Route 253
- National Route 405

== See also ==
- Jōetsu, Niigata
