= Kiyosato, Niigata =

Dissolved municipality in Niigata prefecture, Japan

Wards in Jōetsu City.

Kiyosato (清里村, Kiyosato-mura) was a village located in Nakakubiki District, Niigata Prefecture, Japan.

As of 2003, the village had an estimated population of 3,215 and a density of 85.64 persons per km^{2}. The total area was 37.54 km^{2}.

On January 1, 2005, Kiyosato, along with the town of Yasuzuka, the villages of Maki, Ōshima and Uragawara (all from Higashikubiki District), the towns of Itakura, Kakizaki, Ōgata and Yoshikawa, the villages of Kubiki, Nakagō and Sanwa (all from Nakakubiki District), and the town of Nadachi (from Nishikubiki District), was merged into the expanded city of Jōetsu.
