= Ōgata, Niigata =

Dissolved municipality in Niigata prefecture, Japan

Wards in Jōetsu City.

Ōgata (大潟町, Ōgata-machi) was a town located in Nakakubiki District, Niigata Prefecture, Japan.

As of 2003, the town had an estimated population of 10,636 and a density of 651.72 persons per km^{2}. The total area was 16.32 km^{2}.

On January 1, 2005, Ōgata, along with the town of Yasuzuka, the villages of Maki, Ōshima and Uragawara (all from Higashikubiki District), the towns of Itakura, Kakizaki and Yoshikawa, the villages of Kiyosato, Kubiki, Nakagō and Sanwa (all from Nakakubiki District), and the town of Nadachi (from Nishikubiki District), was merged into the expanded city of Jōetsu.
