= Yoshikawa, Niigata =

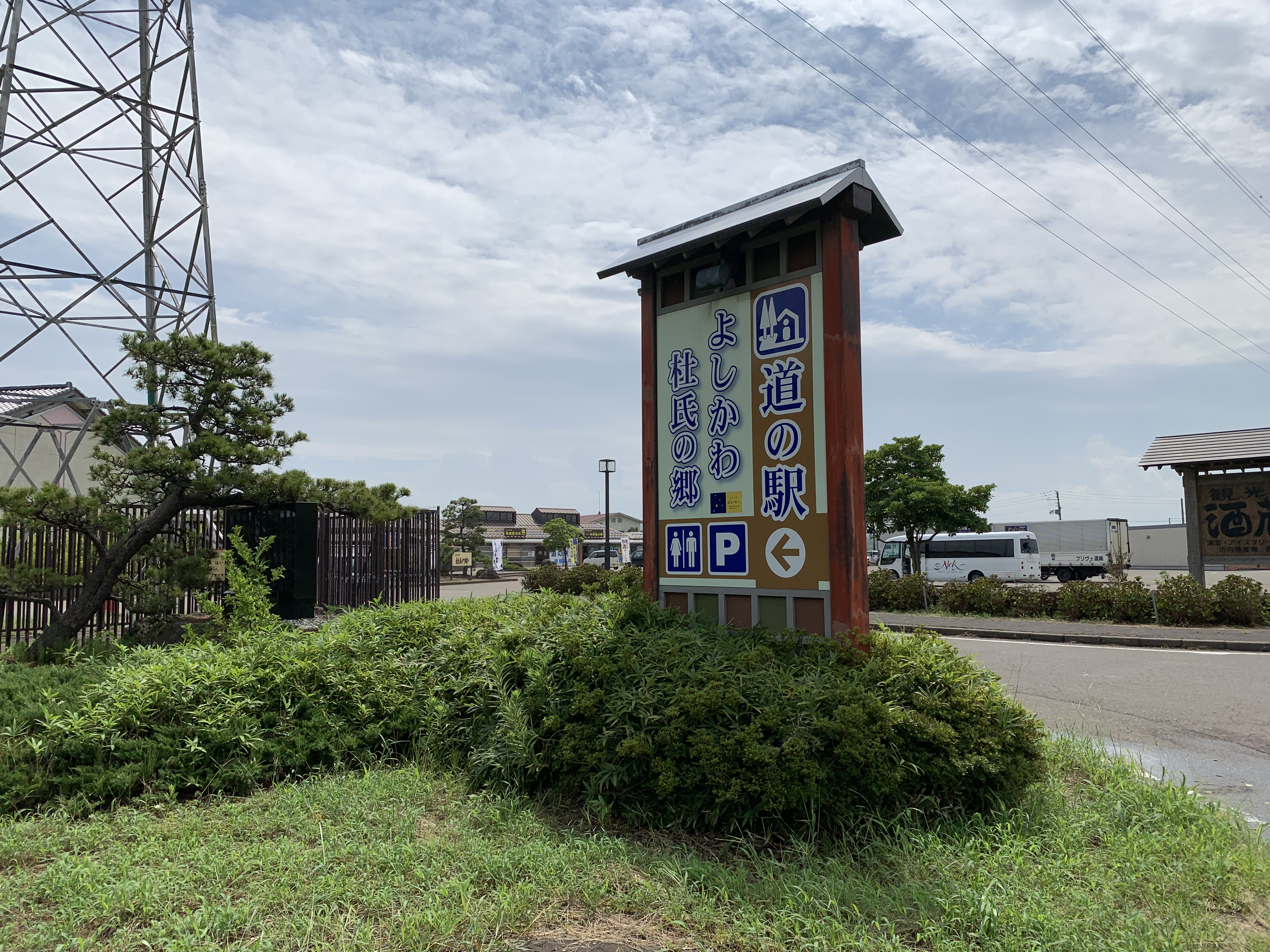
- Yoshikawa Toujinosato, Roadside Station, Niigata, Japan.

- Flag Emblem

- Wards in Jōetsu City.

Yoshikawa (吉川町, Yoshikawa-machi) was a town located in Nakakubiki District, Niigata Prefecture, Japan.

As of 2003, the town had an estimated population of 5,253 and a density of 68.57 persons per km^{2}. The total area was 76.61 km^{2}.

On January 1, 2005, Yoshikawa, along with the town of Yasuzuka, the villages of Maki, Ōshima and Uragawara (all from Higashikubiki District), the towns of Itakura, Kakizaki and Ōgata, the villages of Kiyosato, Kubiki, Nakagō and Sanwa (all from Nakakubiki District), and the town of Nadachi (from Nishikubiki District), was merged into the expanded city of Jōetsu.
