= Sanwa, Niigata =

Dissolved municipality in Niigata prefecture, Japan

Wards in Jōetsu City.

Sanwa (三和村, Sanwa-mura) was a village located in Nakakubiki District, Niigata, Japan.

== Population ==
As of 2003, the village had an estimated population of 6,191 and a density of 157.29 persons per km^{2}. The total area was 39.36 km^{2}.

== History ==
On January 1, 2005, Sanwa, along with the town of Yasuzuka, the villages of Maki, Ōshima and Uragawara (all from Higashikubiki District), the towns of Itakura, Kakizaki, Ōgata and Yoshikawa, the villages of Kiyosato, Kubiki and Nakagō (all from Nakakubiki District), and the town of Nadachi (from Nishikubiki District), was merged into the expanded city of Jōetsu.
