= Maki, Niigata (Higashikubiki) =

Village in Japan

Wards in Jōetsu City.

Maki (牧村, Maki-mura) was a village located in Higashikubiki District, Niigata Prefecture, Japan.

The village was established in 1901 by merging the nearby villages of Kawabe, Kawakami and Kunimi. Maki had a population of 2,940 as of January 1, 2003.

On January 1, 2005, Maki, along with the town of Yasuzuka, the villages of Ōshima and Uragawara (all from Higashikubiki District), the towns of Itakura, Kakizaki, Ōgata and Yoshikawa, the villages of Kiyosato, Kubiki, Nakagō and Sanwa (all from Nakakubiki District), and the town of Nadachi (from Nishikubiki District), was merged into the expanded city of Jōetsu.

The city of Jōetsu maintains the Maki Folk History Museum (牧歴史民俗資料館, Maki Rekishi Minzoku Shiryōkan) within the grounds of the Miyaguchi Kofun, a park containing kofun graves dating from the late Kofun period. The second floor of the museum contains exhibits relating to the history of the village.
