= Nō, Niigata =

Dissolved municipality in Niigata prefecture, Japan

Nō (能生町, Nō-machi) was a town in the Nishikubiki District of Niigata Prefecture in Japan.

== Population ==
As of 2003, the town had an estimated population of 10,266 and a population density of 68.22 persons per km^{2}. The total area was 150.49 km^{2}.

== Merge ==
On March 19, 2005, Nō, along with the town of Ōmi (also in Nishikubiki District), was merged into the expanded city of Itoigawa.
