= Koshiji, Niigata =

Koshiji 越路町
- Former municipality
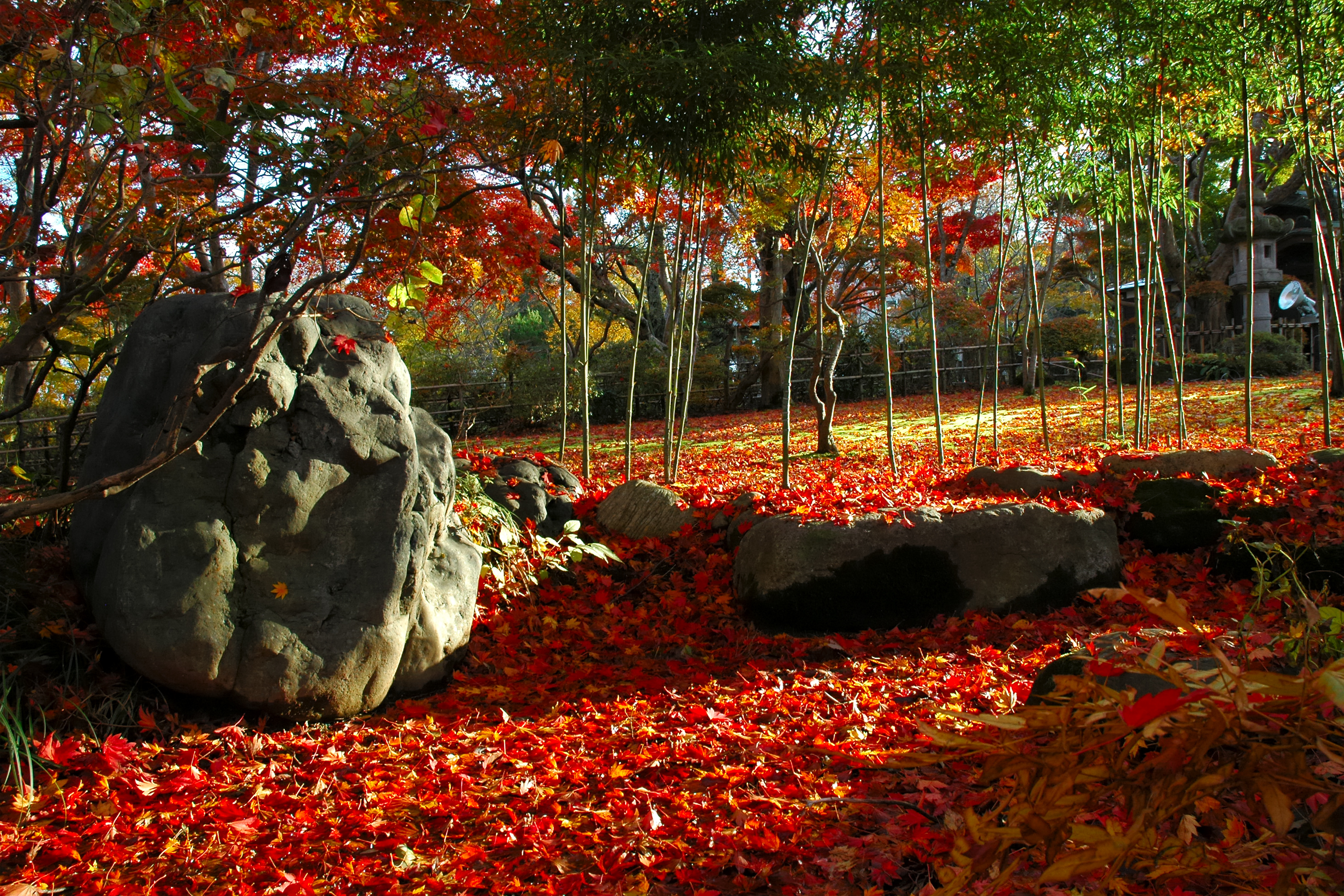
- Momijien

- Flag Emblem
- Interactive map of Koshiji
- Country: Japan
- Region: Hokuriku
- Prefecture: Niigata Prefecture
- Merged: April 1, 2005 (now part of Nagaoka)

Area
  - Total: 58.44 km^{2} (22.56 sq mi)

Population (2003)
  - Total: 14,160
- Time zone: UTC+09:00 (JST)

10 municipalities merged into Nagaoka City

Koshiji (越路町, Koshiji-machi) was a town located in Santō District, Niigata Prefecture, Japan.

As of 2003, the town had an estimated population of 14,160 and a density of 242.30 persons per km^{2}. The total area was 58.44 km^{2}.

On April 1, 2005, Koshiji, along with the town of Oguni (from Kariwa District), the village of Yamakoshi (from Koshi District), the town of Nakanoshima (from Minamikanbara District), and the town of Mishima (also from Santō District), was merged into the expanded city of Nagaoka.

== Transportation ==
=== Railway ===
JR East - Shin'etsu Main Line
- Tsukayama - Echigo-Iwatsuka - Raikōji
Echigo Kotsu Nagaoka Line(ja:越後交通長岡線) (until 1975)
- Raikōji
JNR Uonuma Line(ja:魚沼線) (until 1984)
- Raikōji

=== Highway ===
- National Route 351
- National Route 403
- National Route 404

== Local attractions ==
- Momijien(ja:もみじ園)
- Hotokusan Inari Taisha Shrine(ja:宝徳山稲荷大社)
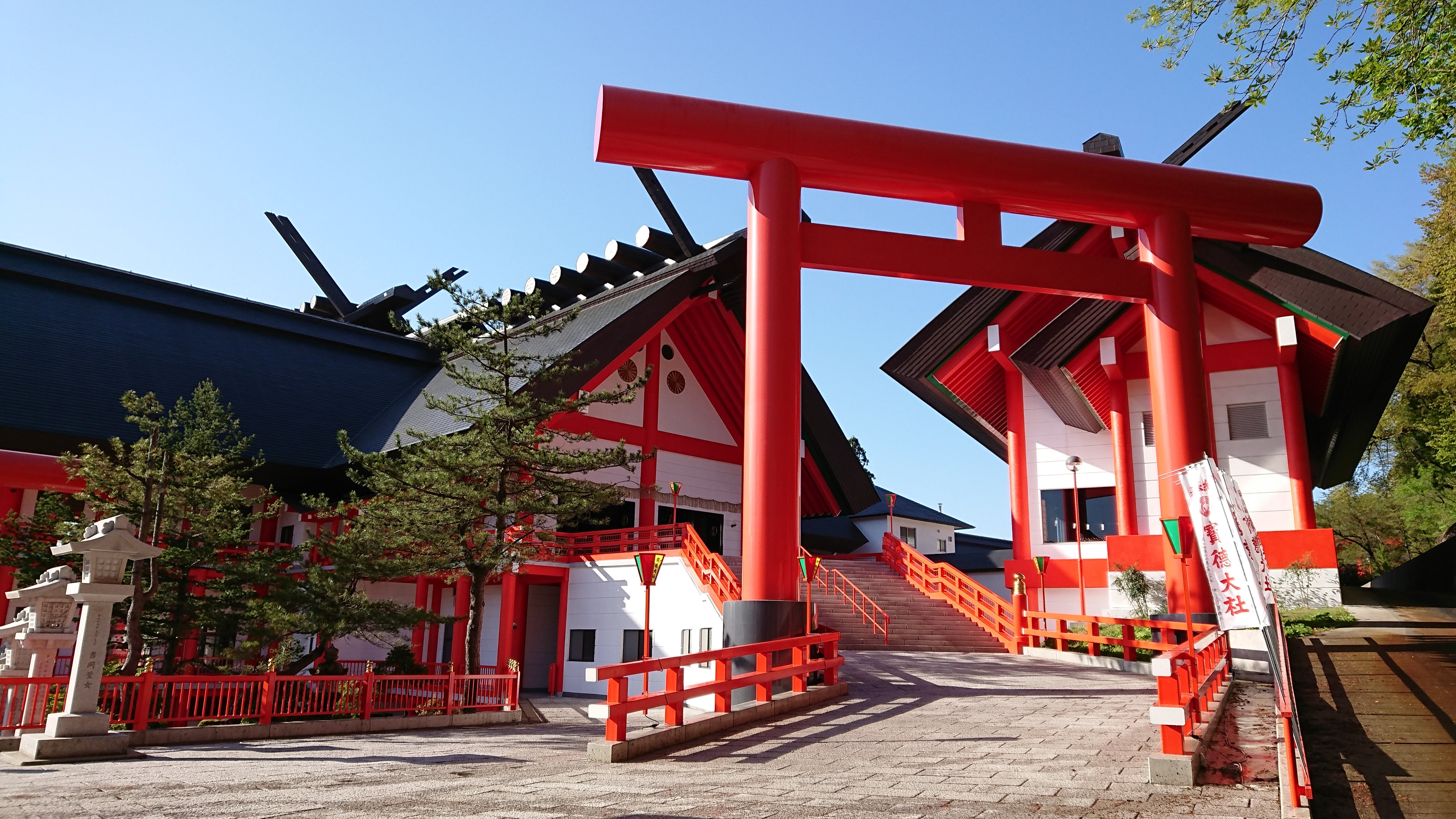
Hotokusan Inari
