= Oguni, Niigata =

Oguni 小国町
- Former municipality
- Flag Seal
- Interactive map of Oguni
- Country: Japan
- Region: Hokuriku
- Prefecture: Niigata Prefecture
- Merged: April 1, 2005 (now part of Nagaoka)

Area
  - Total: 86.15 km^{2} (33.26 sq mi)

Population (2003)
  - Total: 7,044
- Time zone: UTC+09:00 (JST)

Oguni (小国町, Oguni-machi) was a town located in Kariwa District, Niigata Prefecture, Japan.

== Population ==
As of 2003, the town had an estimated population of 7,044 and a density of 81.76 persons per km^{2}. The total area was 86.15 km^{2}.

== Merge ==
On April 1, 2005, Oguni, along with the village of Yamakoshi (from Koshi District), the town of Nakanoshima (from Minamikanbara District), and the towns of Koshiji and Mishima (both from Santō District), was merged into the expanded city of Nagaoka.

10 municipalities merged into Nagaoka City

== Transportation ==
=== Highway ===
- National Route 291
- National Route 403
- National Route 404
