= Yamakoshi, Niigata =

Yamakoshi 山古志村
- Former municipality
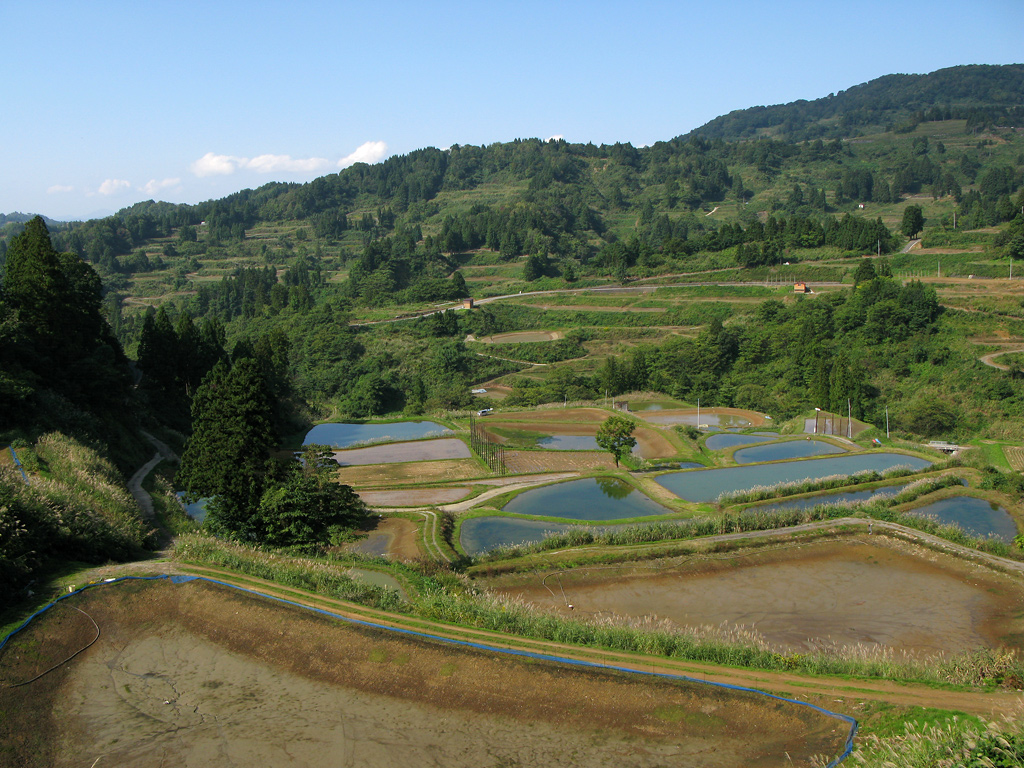
- Rice terraces in Yamakoshi

- Flag Seal
- Interactive map of Yamakoshi
- Country: Japan
- Region: Hokuriku
- Prefecture: Niigata Prefecture
- Merged: April 1, 2005 (now part of Nagaoka)

Area
  - Total: 39.83 km^{2} (15.38 sq mi)

Population (2003)
  - Total: 2,035
- Time zone: UTC+09:00 (JST)

10 municipalities merged into Nagaoka City

Yamakoshi (山古志村, Yamakoshi-mura) was a village located in Koshi District, Niigata Prefecture, Japan.

As of 2003, the village had an estimated population of 2,035 and a density of 51.09 persons per km^{2}. The total area was 39.83 km^{2}.

On April 1, 2005, Yamakoshi, along with the town of Oguni (from Kariwa District), the town of Nakanoshima (from Minamikanbara District), and the towns of Koshiji and Mishima (both from Santō District), was merged into the expanded city of Nagaoka.

On October 23, 2004, Yamakoshi was hit by the 2004 Chūetsu earthquake.

== Transportation ==
=== Highway ===
- National Route 291
- National Route 352

== Local attractions ==
- Bullfighting(ja:牛の角突き)
- Rice Terraces
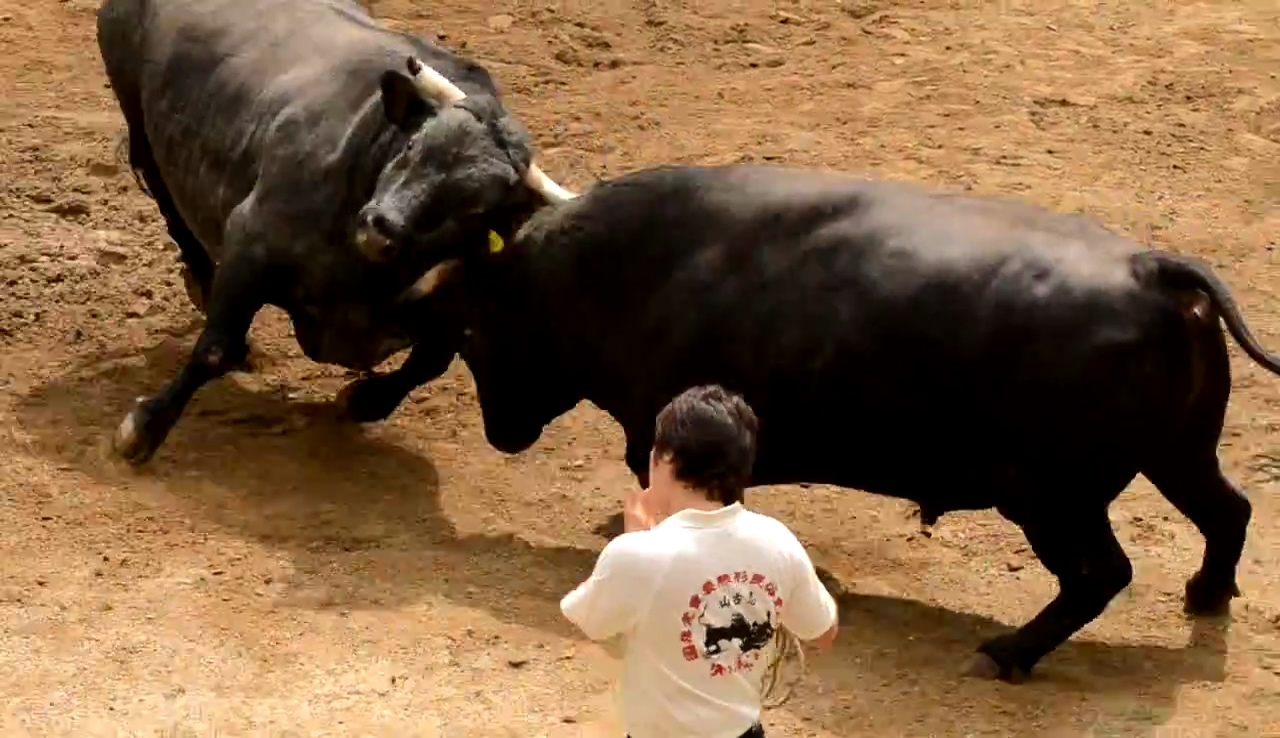
Bullfighting

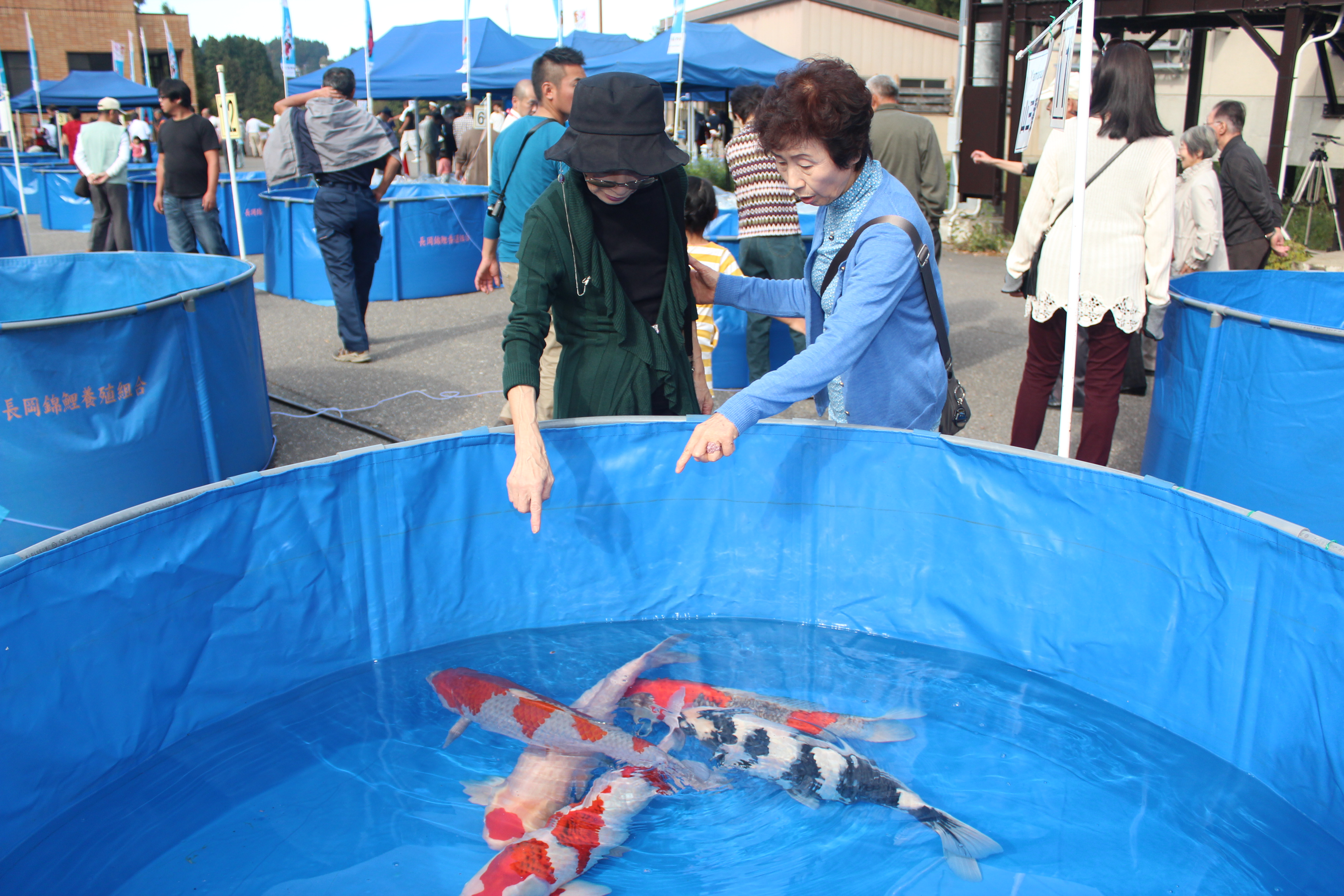
Koi in Yamakoshi

== See also ==
- 2004 Chūetsu earthquake
