= Mishima, Niigata =

Mishima 三島町
- Former municipality
- Interactive map of Mishima
- Country: Japan
- Region: Hokuriku
- Prefecture: Niigata Prefecture
- Merged: April 1, 2005 (now part of Nagaoka)

Area
  - Total: 36.47 km^{2} (14.08 sq mi)

Population (2003)
  - Total: 7,535
- Time zone: UTC+09:00 (JST)

10 municipalities merged into Nagaoka City

Mishima (三島町, Mishima-machi) was a town located in Santō District, Niigata Prefecture, Japan.

As of 2003, the town has an estimated population of 7,535 and a density of 206.61 persons per square kilometre (535.1 per square mile). The total area is 36.47 km^{2} (14.08 sq mi).

On April 1, 2005, Mishima, along with the town of Oguni (from Kariwa District), the village of Yamakoshi (from Koshi District), the town of Nakanoshima (from Minamikanbara District), and the town of Koshiji (also from Santō District), was merged into the expanded city of Nagaoka.

== Transportation ==
=== Railway ===
Echigo Kotsu Nagaoka Line had been operated in the town until 1975.

=== Highway ===
- National Route 352
- National Route 403
