= Nakanoshima, Niigata =

Nakanoshima 中之島町
- Former municipality
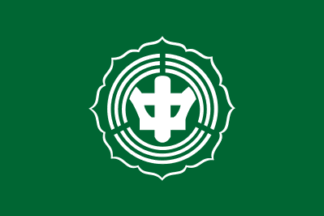
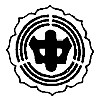
- Flag Seal
- Interactive map of Nakanoshima
- Country: Japan
- Region: Hokuriku
- Prefecture: Niigata Prefecture
- Merged: April 1, 2005 (now part of Nagaoka)

Area
  - Total: 42.55 km^{2} (16.43 sq mi)

Population (2003)
  - Total: 12,503
- Time zone: UTC+09:00 (JST)

10 municipalities merged into Nagaoka City

Nakanoshima (中之島町, Nakanoshima-machi) was a town located in Minamikanbara District, Niigata Prefecture, Japan.

As of 2003, the town had an estimated population of 12,503 and a density of 293.84 persons per km^{2}. The total area was 42.55 km^{2}.

On April 1, 2005, Nakanoshima, along with the town of Oguni (from Kariwa District), the village of Yamakoshi (from Koshi District), and the towns of Koshiji and Mishima (both from Santō District), was merged into the expanded city of Nagaoka.

== Transportation ==
=== Railway ===
JR East - Shin'etsu Main Line
- Oshikiri

=== Highway ===
- Hokuriku Expressway - Nakanoshima-Mitsuke IC
- National Route 8
- National Route 403
