= Yoshio Tamura =

Japanese architect (born 1951)

Yoshio Tamura (田村 芳夫, Tamura Yoshio; born 1951) is a Japanese architect. He is the Representative Director and an architect at Atelier Riga T Architect and Associates Co. Ltd. From 2002 to 2014 he was a special lecturer at Kogakuin University. He was also a special lecturer at the Nagaoka Institute of Design from 2002 to 2017.

== Biography ==
Tamura was born in 1951 in Niigata Prefecture. In 1975, he graduated from the Department of Architecture at Kogakuin University. Between 1975 and 1988 he worked at Archivision Architect and Associates. In 1988, he was appointed Representative Director of Atelier Riga T Architect and Associates. Between 2002 and 2014 he was Special Lecturer at Kogakuin University. Between 2002 and 2017 he was Special Lecturer at the Nagaoka Institute of Design.

== Awards ==
Project	Award
Sano City Museum (jp:佐野市郷土博物館)	Architecture Institute of Japan Award (jp:日本建築学会賞)
Tokyo Metropolitan Archaeological Center (jp:東京都埋蔵文化財センター)	1st Annual Public Building Award for Outstanding Performance
The Museum, Archaeological Institute of Kashihara, Nara Prefecture	22nd Building Contractors Society Award (jp:BCS賞)
Chita City Folk Museum (jp:知多市歴史民俗博物館)	Central Japan Architecture Award
Hamamatsu City Museum (jp:浜松市博物館)	Central Japan Architecture Award
Gamagori City Museum (jp:蒲郡市博物館)	Central Japan Architecture Award
Tokoname City Folk Museum	Central Japan Architecture Award
Kanagawa Prefectural Archaeological Artifacts Center (jp:神奈川県埋蔵文化財センター)	Kanagawa Architecture Concours Outstanding Performance Award
Ofunato City Museum	4th Annual Northwestern Japan Architecture Award
Kiyose City Museum	Tokyo Architecture Award for Outstanding Performance
Nara City New Conference Hall (jp:奈良県新公会堂)	Nara City Cityscape Design Award; 6th Annual Iraka Awards, Gold Prize 4th Annual Public Building Award for Outstanding Performance
Kawagoe City Museum (jp:川越市立博物館)	Saitama City Cityscape Award; 4th Annual Public Building Award for Outstanding Performance
The Historical Museum of Jomon Village Okumatsushima	4th Annual Roof Contest, First Prize
Tateyama Caldera Sabo Museum (jp:立山カルデラ砂防博物館)	8th Annual Public Building Award for Outstanding Performance
