= Hachimanbayashi Kanga ruins =

Ancient castle ruins in Nagaoka, Hokuriku, Japan

- 八幡林官衙遺跡 (Japanese)
- Hachimanbayashi Kanga ruins Hachimanbayashi Kanga ruins (Japan)
- 37°34′47″N 138°45′28″E
- Type: Settlement
- Location: Nagaoka, Niigata, Japan
- Region: Hokuriku region

History
- Built: Asuka period

Site notes
- Public access: Yes (no facilities)

The Hachimanbayashi Kanga ruins (八幡林官衙遺跡, Hachimanbayashi kanga iseki) is an archaeological site containing the ruins of an Asuka period jōsaku-style Japanese castle located in what is now the Shimazaki neighborhood of the city of Nagaoka, Niigata in the Hokuriku region of Japan. The site was designated a National Historic Site of Japan in 1995.

== Overview ==
In the late Asuka period and Nara period, the imperial court sent a number of military expeditions to what is now the Hokuriku region extend its effective control further north and to subdue the local Emishi tribes in the area. At the time, Echigo Province was still part of ancient Koshi Province, and per the Nihon Shoki, in 647 AD, Fort Nutari (渟足柵, Nutari no saku), a fortified government outpost with an earthen rampart surmounted by a wooden palisade, and protected by a dry moat was established.

In the late Nara period, after the establishment of a centralized government under the Ritsuryō system, local rule over the provinces was standardized under a kokufu (provincial capital), and each province was divided into smaller administrative districts, known as (郡, gun, kōri), composed of 2–20 townships in 715 AD. Each of the units had an administrative complex built on a semi-standardized layout based on contemporary Chinese design.

The Hachimanbayashi site is located on a low hill that protrudes into valley of the Shimazaki River, a tributary of the Shinano River. This area has a high concentration of ancient ruins, and three of the six Shinto shrines mentioned in the Engishiki chronicles as existing in ancient Koshi County are concentrated in this area.

As the result of an excavation conducted from 1990 to 1991, the outlines of a structure such as was described in the Nihon Shoki was discovered, and numerous wooden tags with markings indicating that they belonged to the "Nutari no saku" and to the "Provincial capital of Koshi" were found. Numerous pottery shards dating to the 9th century were also found. The site, which covers an area of around 40,000 square meters, is located on the route of the ancient Hokuriku Kaidō highway, and from the layout of the building foundations, it was clear that this was the ruins of a kanga, or district-level administrative complex. The pottery shards indicate that it existed well into the Heian period, but it is not known when it was eventually abandoned.

The site is located about 20 minutes on foot from Ojimaya Station, on the JR East Echigo Line. It was backfilled after excavation and is now an empty field.

== See also ==
- List of Historic Sites of Japan (Niigata)
