= Tsukayama Station =

Railway station in Nagaoka, Niigata Prefecture, Japan

Tsukayama Station 塚山駅
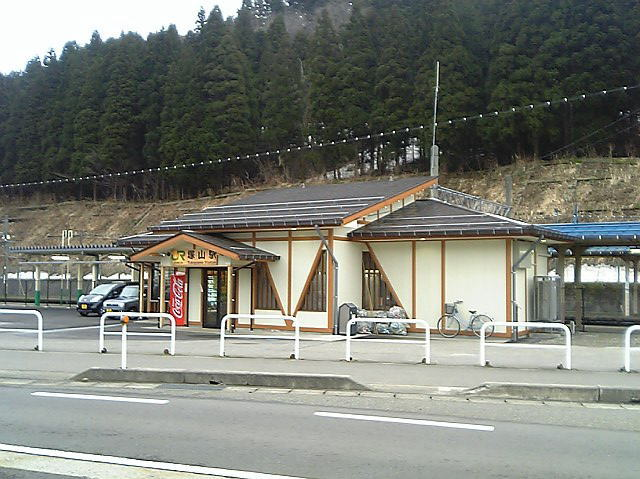
- Tsukayama Station, April 2006

General information
- Location: 3335 Nishidani, Nagaoka-shi, Niigata-ken 949-5121; Japan
- Coordinates: 37.3551°N 138.7300°E
- Operator: JR East
- Line: ■ Shin'etsu Main Line
- Platforms: 2 side platforms
- Tracks: 2

Other information
- Status: Unstaffed
- Website: Official website

History
- Opened: 27 December 1897; 128 years ago

Passengers
- 210 daily (FY2014)

Services
Preceding station	JR East	Following station
Nagatori towards Naoetsu	Shin'etsu Main Line Local	Echigo-Iwatsuka towards Niigata
Location
- Location within JR Shinetsu Main Line Location within Japan

Tsukayama Station (塚山駅, Tsukayama-eki) is a railway station in the city of Nagaoka, Niigata, Japan, operated by East Japan Railway Company (JR East).

== Lines ==
Tsukayama Station is served by the Shin'etsu Main Line and is 55.8 kilometers from the terminus of the line at Naoetsu Station.

== Station layout ==
The station consists of two ground-level opposed side platforms connected by a footbridge, serving three tracks, with the middle track not in use for passenger traffic. The station is unattended.

=== Platforms ===
1	■ Shin'etsu Main Line	for Nagaoka, Niigata
2	■ Shin'etsu Main Line	for Kashiwazaki, Naoetsu

== History ==
Tsukayama Station opened on 27 December 1897. With the privatization of Japanese National Railways (JNR) on 1 April 1987, the station came under the control of JR East. The station building was severely damaged by the 23 October 2004 2004 Chūetsu earthquake and was replaced in 2005.

== Passenger statistics ==
In fiscal 2014, the station was used by an average of 210 passengers daily (boarding passengers only).

== Surrounding area ==
- Tsukayama Post Office
- National Route 404

== See also ==
- List of railway stations in Japan
