= Takayanagi, Niigata =

Former town in Niigata Prefecture, Japan

Takayanagi (高柳町, Takayanagi-machi) was a town located in Kariwa District, Niigata Prefecture, Japan.

As of 2003, the town had an estimated population of 2,293 and a density of 35.48 persons per km^{2}. The total area was 64.63 km^{2}.

On May 1, 2005, Takayanagi, along with the town of Nishiyama (also from Kariwa District), was merged into the expanded city of Kashiwazaki.
