= Koshi District, Niigata =

Former district in Niigata prefecture, Japan

Coordinates: 37°19′35.7″N 138°53′24″E

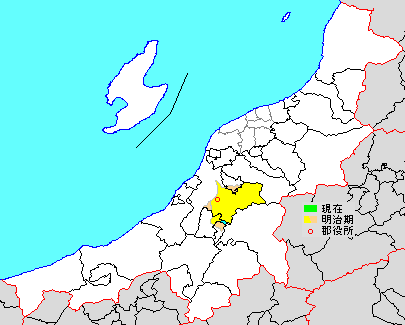
Map showing original extent of Koshi District in Niigata Prefecture: * yellow - areas formerly within the district borders during the early Meiji period

Koshi (古志郡, Koshi-gun) was a district located in Niigata Prefecture, Japan.

As of 2003, the district had an estimated population of 2,035 with a density of 51.09 persons per km^{2}. The total area is 39.83 km^{2}.

== Municipalities ==
Prior to its dissolution, the district contained only one village:

- Yamakoshi (Note: Classified as a village.)

== History ==
=== Recent mergers ===
- On April 1, 2005 - The village of Yamakoshi, along with the town of Oguni (from Kariwa District), the town of Nakanoshima (from Minamikanbara District), and the towns of Koshiji and Mishima (both from Santō District), was merged into the expanded city of Nagaoka. Therefore, Koshi District was dissolved as a result of this merger.

== See also ==
- List of dissolved districts of Japan
