= Japan National Route 405 =

Road in Japan

National Route 405
- 国道405号
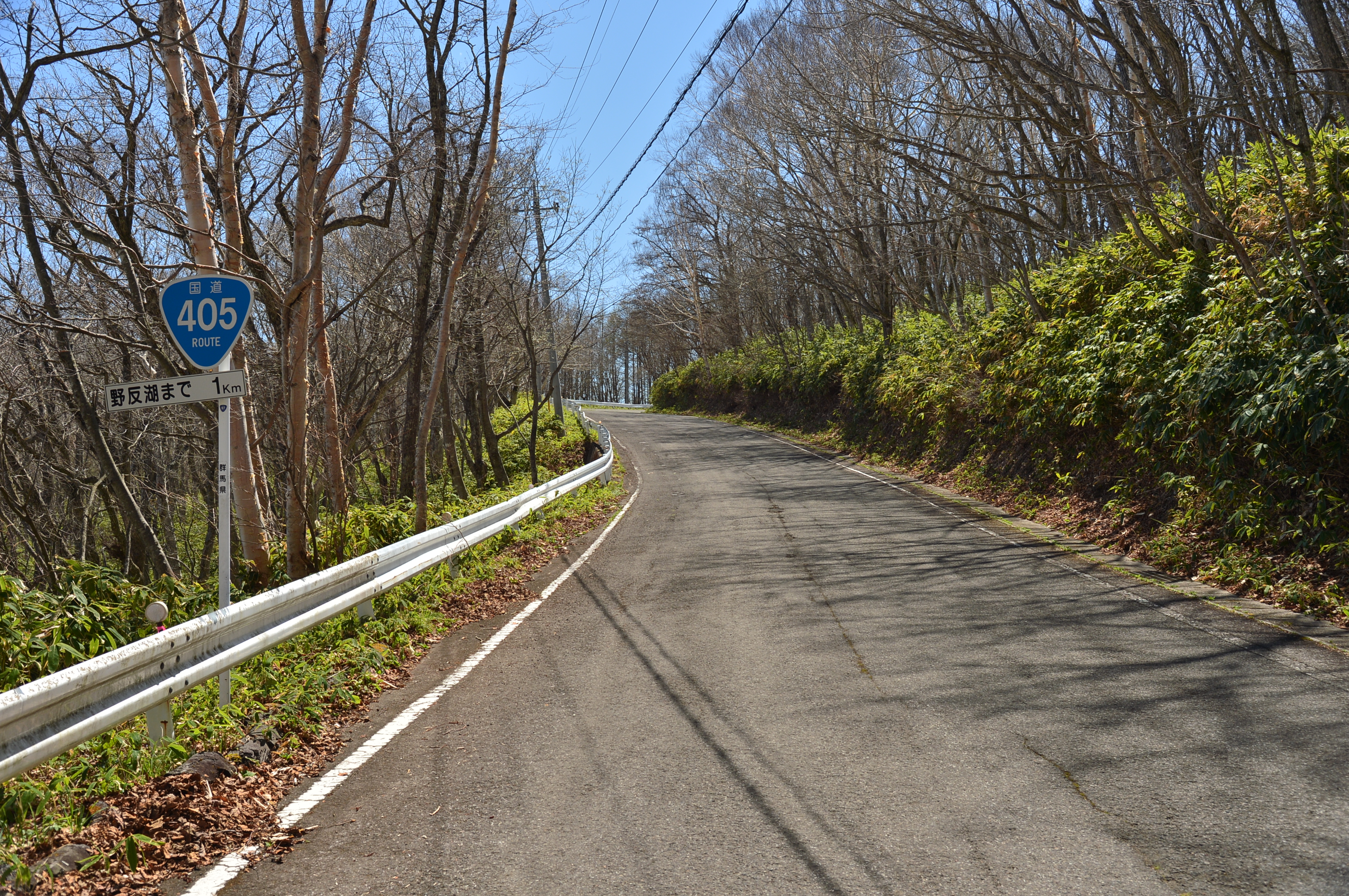

Route information
- Length: 109.6 km (68.1 mi)

Location
- Country: Japan

Highway system
- National highways of Japan; Expressways of Japan
← National Route 404	→ National Route 406

National Route 405 is a national highway of Japan connecting Nakanojō, Gunma and Jōetsu, Niigata in Japan, with a total length of 109.6 km (68.1 mi).
