= Nishiyama, Niigata =

Dissolved municipality in Niigata prefecture, Japan

Nishiyama (西山町, Nishiyama-machi) was a town located in Kariwa District, Niigata Prefecture, Japan.

As of 2003, the town had an estimated population of 6,712 and a density of 118.52 persons per km^{2}. The total area was 56.63 km^{2}.

On May 1, 2005, Nishiyama, along with the town of Takayanagi (also from Kariwa District), was merged into the expanded city of Kashiwazaki.

The town was the birthplace of Kakuei Tanaka, once the Japanese prime minister.
