= Nagaoka, Niigata =

Nagaoka 長岡市
- Special city
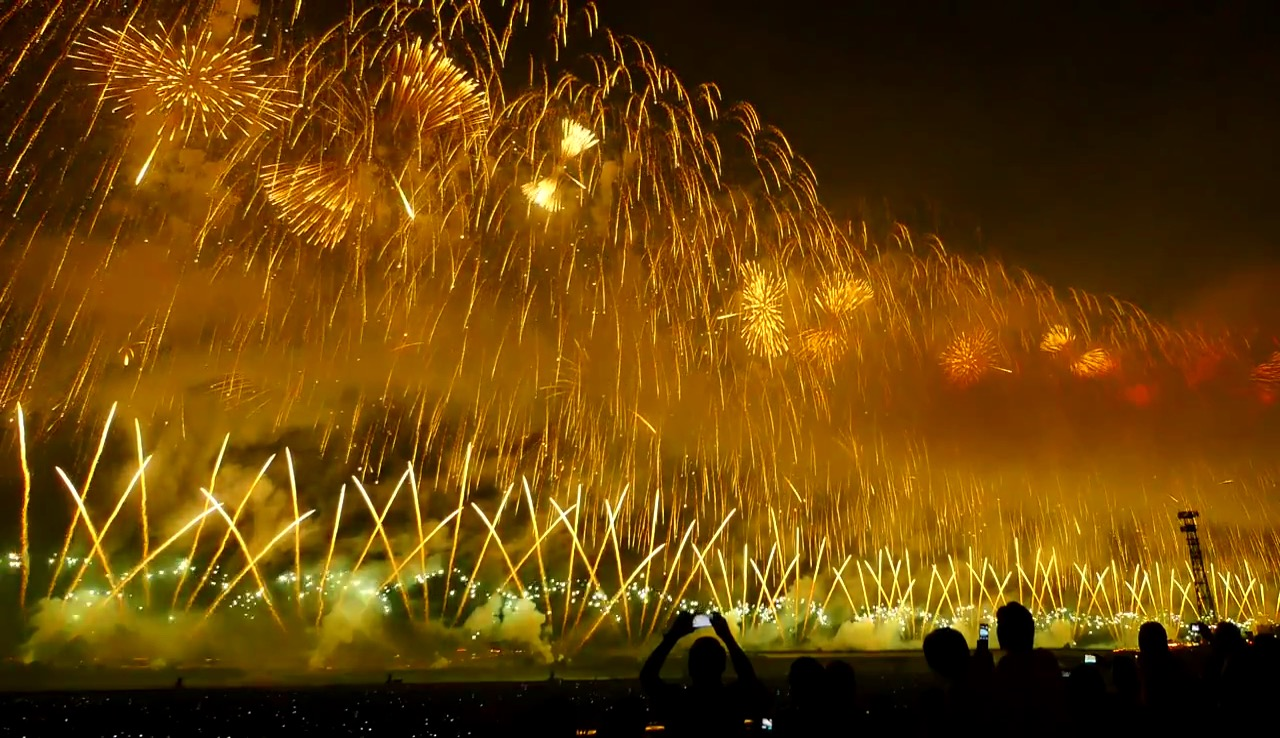

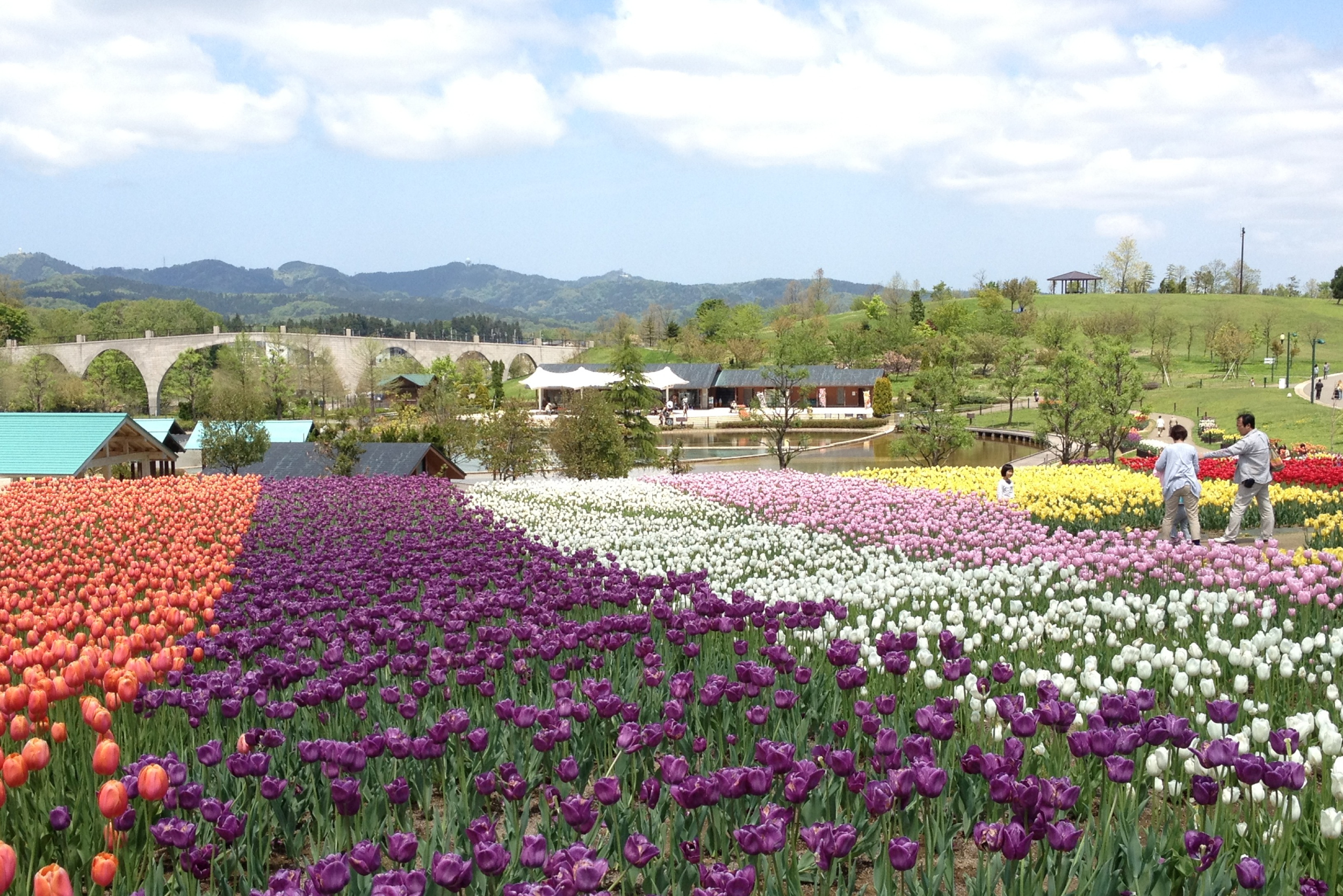

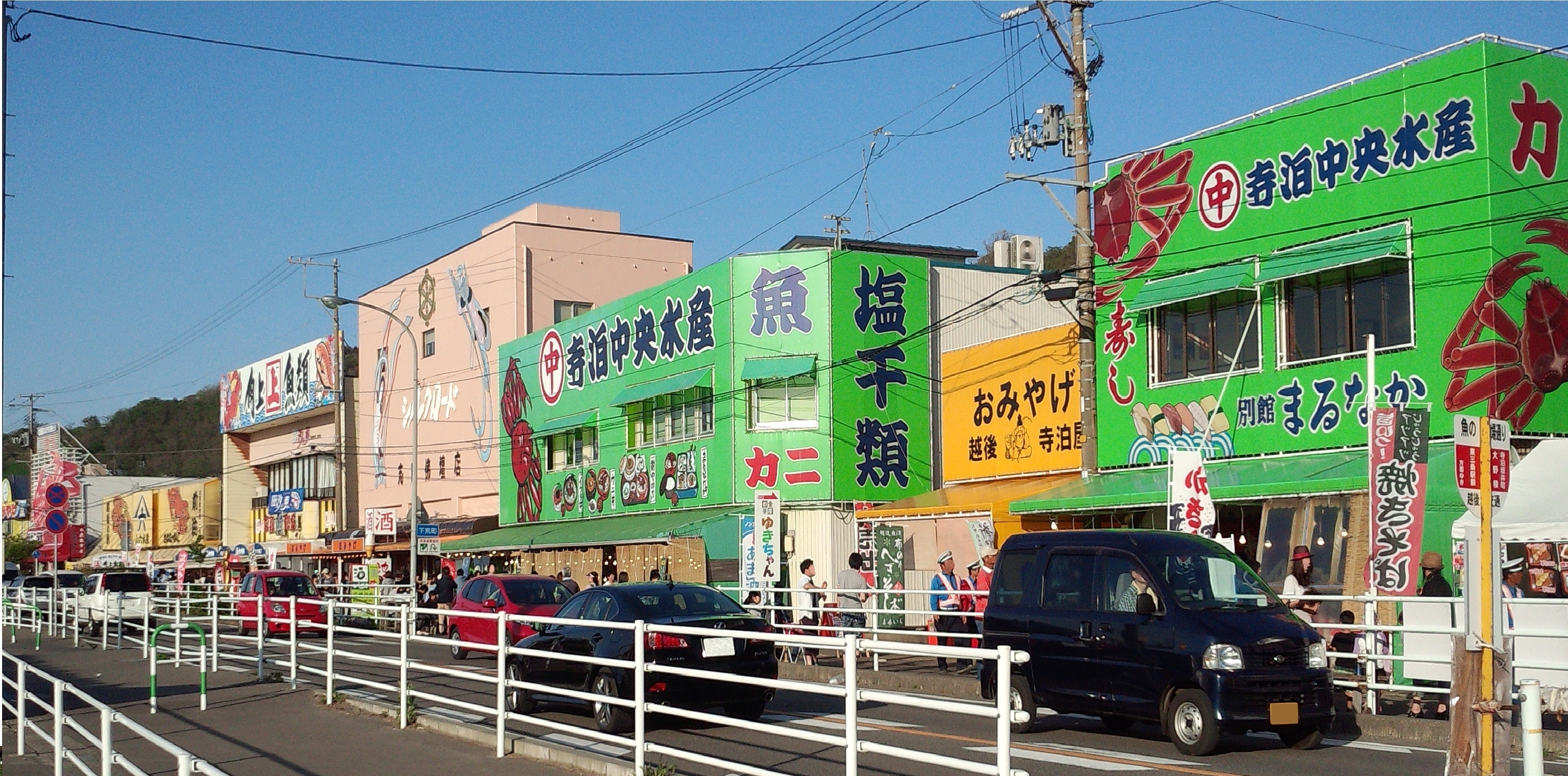

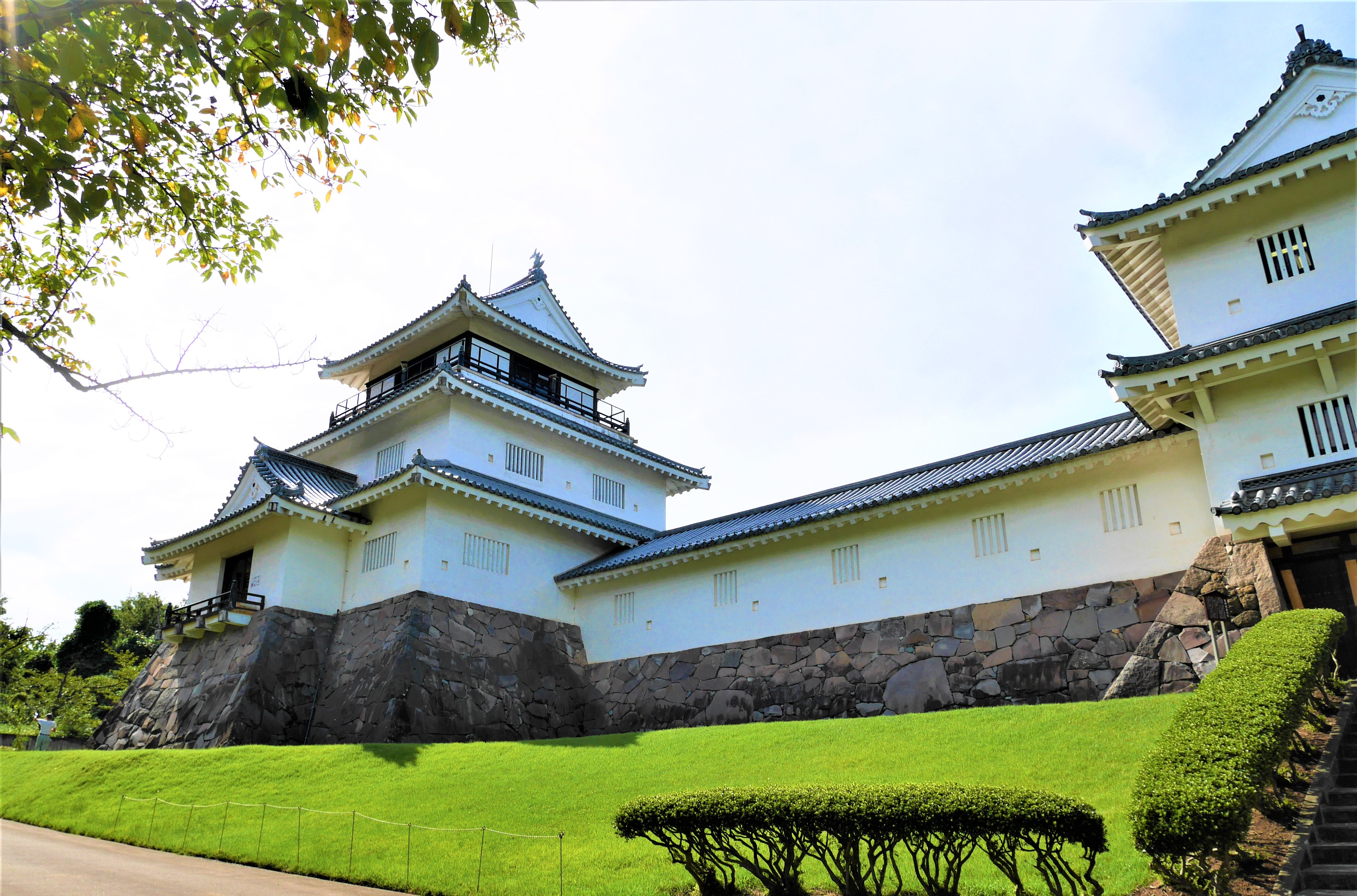

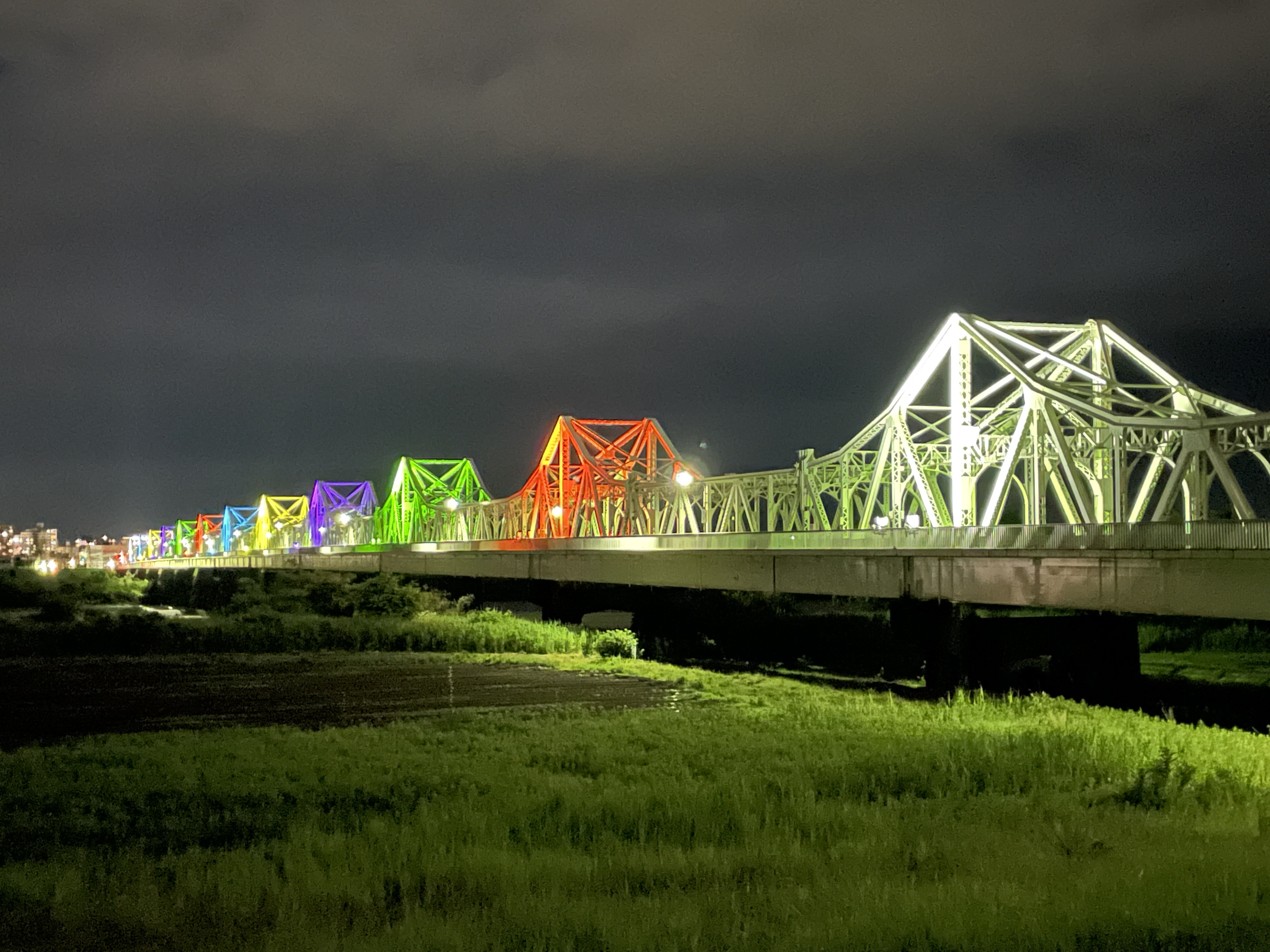

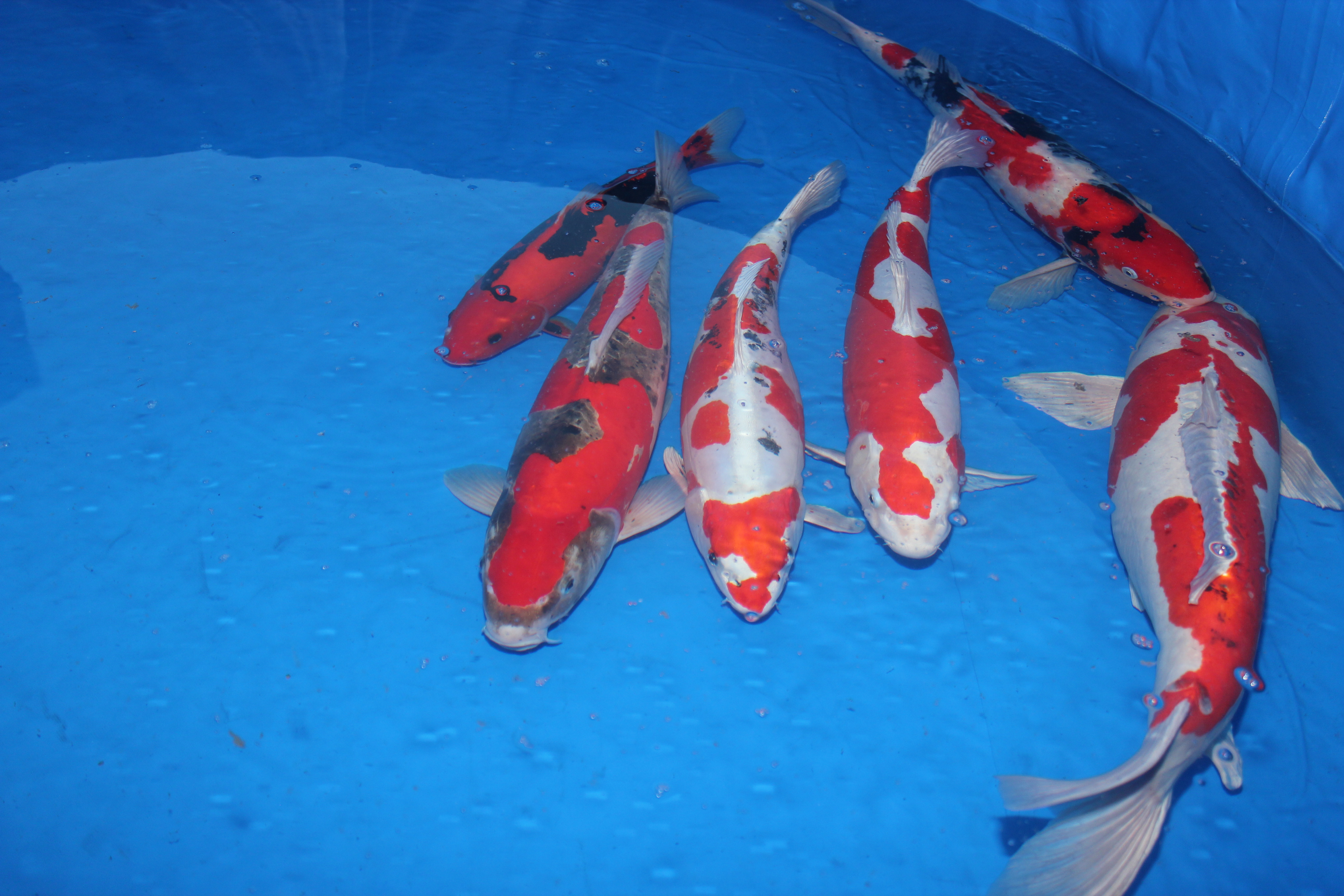
Nagaoka Matsuri and Fireworks
Echigo Hillside Park		Teradomari Fish Market
Yukyuzan Park	Chosei Bridge	Nishiki Koi
- Flag Seal

- Location of Nagaoka in Niigata

- Location within Japan
- Coordinates: 37°26′46.3″N 138°51′4.5″E
- Country: Japan
- Region: Chūbu (Kōshin'etsu) (Hokuriku)
- Prefecture: Niigata
- Founded: 1616
- City established: April 1, 1906

Government
  - Mayor: Tatsunobu Isoda

Area
  - Total: 891.06 km^{2} (344.04 sq mi)

Population (December 2020)
  - Total: 266,539
  - Density: 299.13/km^{2} (774.73/sq mi)
- Time zone: UTC+9 (Japan Standard Time)
- Climate: Cfa
- Website: Official website
- Symbols
- Fish: Nishiki koi
- Flower: Azalea
- Tree: Zelkova serrata

Nagaoka (長岡市, Nagaoka-shi) is a city located in Niigata Prefecture, Japan. It is the second largest city in the prefecture, after the capital city of Niigata. As of 4 August 2021, the city had an estimated population of 264,611 in 109,283 households and a population density of 300 inhabitants per square kilometre (780/sq mi). The total area of the city was 891.06 square kilometres (344.04 sq mi).

== Geography ==
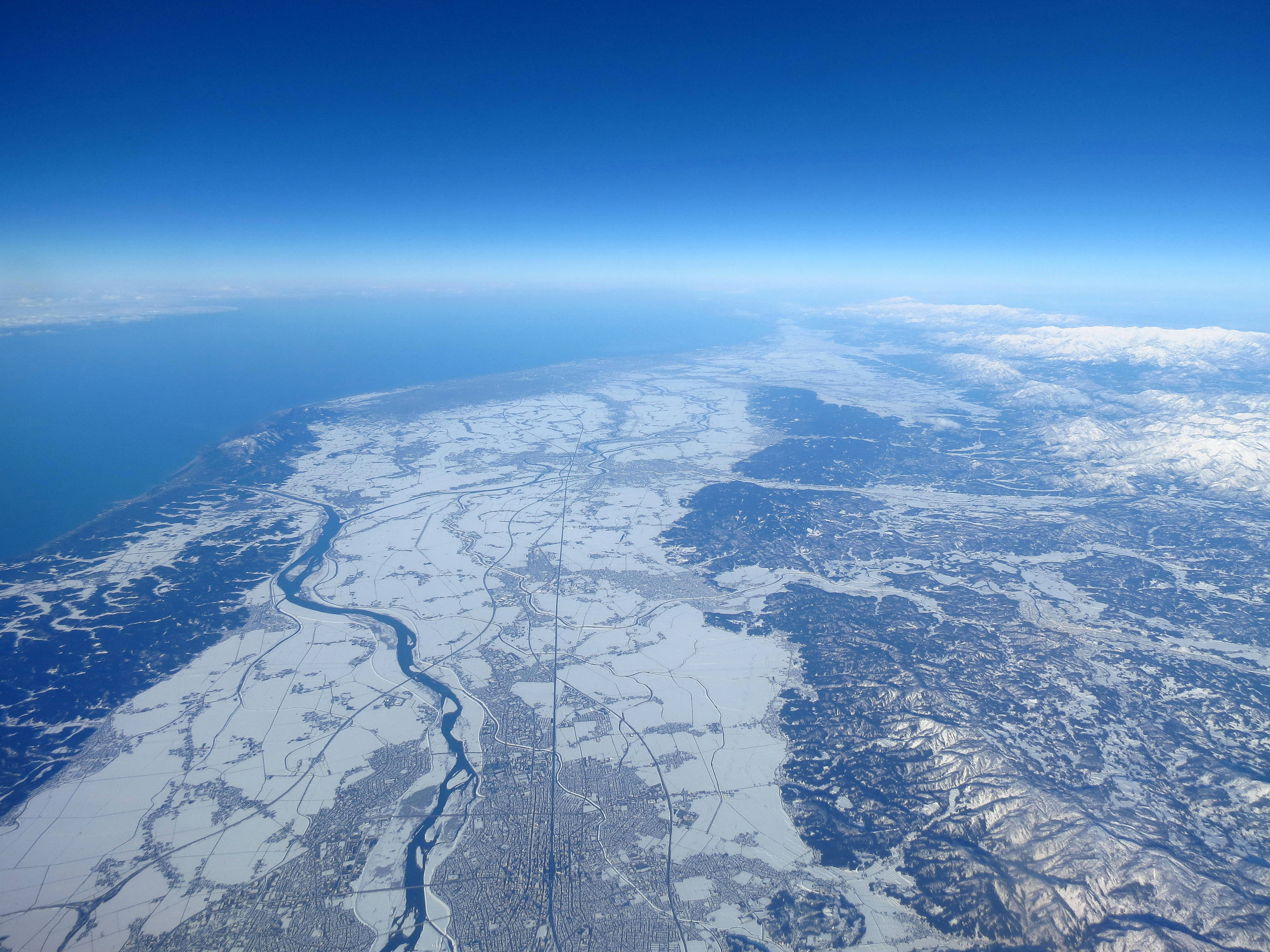
Nagaoka in winter from the sky

Nagaoka is in the center of Niigata prefecture and the surrounding Chūetsu region of Japan, between longitude 138°E and latitude 37°N. It is 80 minutes from Tokyo by way of the Joetsu Shinkansen or three hours on the Kan-Etsu Expressway and is considered a strategic traffic point in the region. Nagaoka was an inland city until January 1, 2006, when the city merged with four municipalities; two were touching the Sea of Japan. The Shinano River flows through the city from south to north and industrial development is on both banks of the river. The Higashiyama mountain range lies to the east.

=== Surrounding municipalities ===
- Niigata Prefecture
  - Izumozaki
  - Kariwa
  - Kashiwazaki
  - Mitsuke
  - Nishikan-ku, Niigata
  - Ojiya
  - Sanjō
  - Tōkamachi
  - Tsubame
  - Uonuma
  - Yahiko

=== Climate ===
Nagaoka has a humid subtropical climate (Köppen Cfa) characterized by warm, wet summers and cold winters with heavy snowfall. The average annual temperature in Nagaoka is 13.3 °C (55.9 °F). The average annual rainfall is 2,349.3 mm (92.49 in) with September as the wettest month. The temperatures are highest on average in August, at around 26.2 °C (79.2 °F), and lowest in January, at around 1.6 °C (34.9 °F).

Climate data for Nagaoka, elevation 23 m (75 ft), (1991−2020 normals, extremes 1976−present)
Month	Jan	Feb	Mar	Apr	May	Jun	Jul	Aug	Sep	Oct	Nov	Dec	Year
Record high °C (°F)	15.0 (59.0)	20.0 (68.0)	26.1 (79.0)	31.4 (88.5)	32.8 (91.0)	37.0 (98.6)	39.4 (102.9)	39.4 (102.9)	38.3 (100.9)	35.3 (95.5)	27.1 (80.8)	19.9 (67.8)	39.4 (102.9)
Mean daily maximum °C (°F)	4.5 (40.1)	5.2 (41.4)	9.4 (48.9)	16.5 (61.7)	22.3 (72.1)	25.7 (78.3)	29.1 (84.4)	30.9 (87.6)	26.7 (80.1)	20.6 (69.1)	14.0 (57.2)	7.6 (45.7)	17.7 (63.9)
Daily mean °C (°F)	1.6 (34.9)	1.8 (35.2)	4.9 (40.8)	11.0 (51.8)	16.9 (62.4)	21.0 (69.8)	24.8 (76.6)	26.2 (79.2)	22.0 (71.6)	15.9 (60.6)	9.6 (49.3)	4.2 (39.6)	13.3 (56.0)
Mean daily minimum °C (°F)	−0.7 (30.7)	−1.1 (30.0)	1.1 (34.0)	6.0 (42.8)	12.1 (53.8)	17.1 (62.8)	21.4 (70.5)	22.5 (72.5)	18.3 (64.9)	12.0 (53.6)	6.0 (42.8)	1.5 (34.7)	9.7 (49.4)
Record low °C (°F)	−9.7 (14.5)	−11.8 (10.8)	−6.3 (20.7)	−2.8 (27.0)	2.9 (37.2)	9.0 (48.2)	13.0 (55.4)	14.1 (57.4)	8.1 (46.6)	2.5 (36.5)	−1.9 (28.6)	−8.4 (16.9)	−11.8 (10.8)
Average precipitation mm (inches)	294.4 (11.59)	165.5 (6.52)	140.8 (5.54)	103.7 (4.08)	97.8 (3.85)	136.9 (5.39)	235.0 (9.25)	163.9 (6.45)	165.6 (6.52)	184.6 (7.27)	289.0 (11.38)	372.2 (14.65)	2,349.3 (92.49)
Average snowfall cm (inches)	197 (78)	155 (61)	52 (20)	1 (0.4)	0 (0)	0 (0)	0 (0)	0 (0)	0 (0)	0 (0)	1 (0.4)	76 (30)	477 (188)
Average extreme snow depth cm (inches)	70 (28)	77 (30)	41 (16)	1 (0.4)	0 (0)	0 (0)	0 (0)	0 (0)	0 (0)	0 (0)	1 (0.4)	27 (11)	89 (35)
Average precipitation days (≥ 1.0 mm)	25.8	20.5	18.7	13.4	10.6	11.5	13.8	11.1	13.6	15.1	19.9	24.7	198.7
Average snowy days (≥ 3 cm)	17.1	15.2	5.9	0.1	0	0	0	0	0	0	0.2	7.1	45.6
Mean monthly sunshine hours	37.3	60.6	117.9	170.8	201.3	155.4	143.9	193.5	141.0	132.4	88.3	49.3	1,493.9
Source: Japan Meteorological Agency

Climate data for Teradomari, Nagaoka, elevation 44 m (144 ft), (2001−2020 normals, extremes 2001−present)
Month	Jan	Feb	Mar	Apr	May	Jun	Jul	Aug	Sep	Oct	Nov	Dec	Year
Record high °C (°F)	14.6 (58.3)	21.7 (71.1)	26.1 (79.0)	26.8 (80.2)	31.2 (88.2)	34.1 (93.4)	39.4 (102.9)	40.6 (105.1)	38.0 (100.4)	32.1 (89.8)	26.2 (79.2)	18.8 (65.8)	40.6 (105.1)
Mean daily maximum °C (°F)	5.7 (42.3)	6.7 (44.1)	10.7 (51.3)	15.9 (60.6)	21.1 (70.0)	25.0 (77.0)	28.3 (82.9)	30.6 (87.1)	26.7 (80.1)	20.8 (69.4)	14.6 (58.3)	8.6 (47.5)	17.9 (64.2)
Daily mean °C (°F)	2.6 (36.7)	2.9 (37.2)	5.9 (42.6)	10.7 (51.3)	16.0 (60.8)	20.3 (68.5)	24.1 (75.4)	25.9 (78.6)	21.9 (71.4)	16.0 (60.8)	10.2 (50.4)	5.1 (41.2)	13.5 (56.2)
Mean daily minimum °C (°F)	−0.1 (31.8)	−0.3 (31.5)	1.8 (35.2)	6.3 (43.3)	11.9 (53.4)	16.7 (62.1)	21.1 (70.0)	22.5 (72.5)	18.4 (65.1)	12.2 (54.0)	6.5 (43.7)	1.9 (35.4)	9.9 (49.8)
Record low °C (°F)	−6.6 (20.1)	−6.4 (20.5)	−5.3 (22.5)	−1.3 (29.7)	4.6 (40.3)	10.0 (50.0)	14.4 (57.9)	15.0 (59.0)	7.9 (46.2)	3.9 (39.0)	−1.6 (29.1)	−3.3 (26.1)	−6.6 (20.1)
Average precipitation mm (inches)	181.6 (7.15)	111.3 (4.38)	114.8 (4.52)	103.4 (4.07)	91.3 (3.59)	127.9 (5.04)	273.7 (10.78)	150.4 (5.92)	160.5 (6.32)	154.3 (6.07)	219.0 (8.62)	247.4 (9.74)	1,962.9 (77.28)
Average precipitation days (≥ 1.0 mm)	22.8	17.8	16.3	12.4	10.3	9.5	14.4	10.7	12.6	13.7	19.2	23.8	183.5
Mean monthly sunshine hours	46.1	76.8	140.9	187.3	212.3	194.7	160.1	216.9	168.0	141.4	86.5	49.5	1,675.3
Source: Japan Meteorological Agency

== Demographics ==
Per Japanese census data, the population of Nagaoka peaked at around 1995 and has declined steadily since.

Historical population
Year	Pop.	±%
1960	284,026	—
1970	279,395	−1.6%
1980	289,234	+3.5%
1990	290,923	+0.6%
2000	292,887	+0.7%
2010	282,674	−3.5%
2020	266,539	−5.7%

== History ==
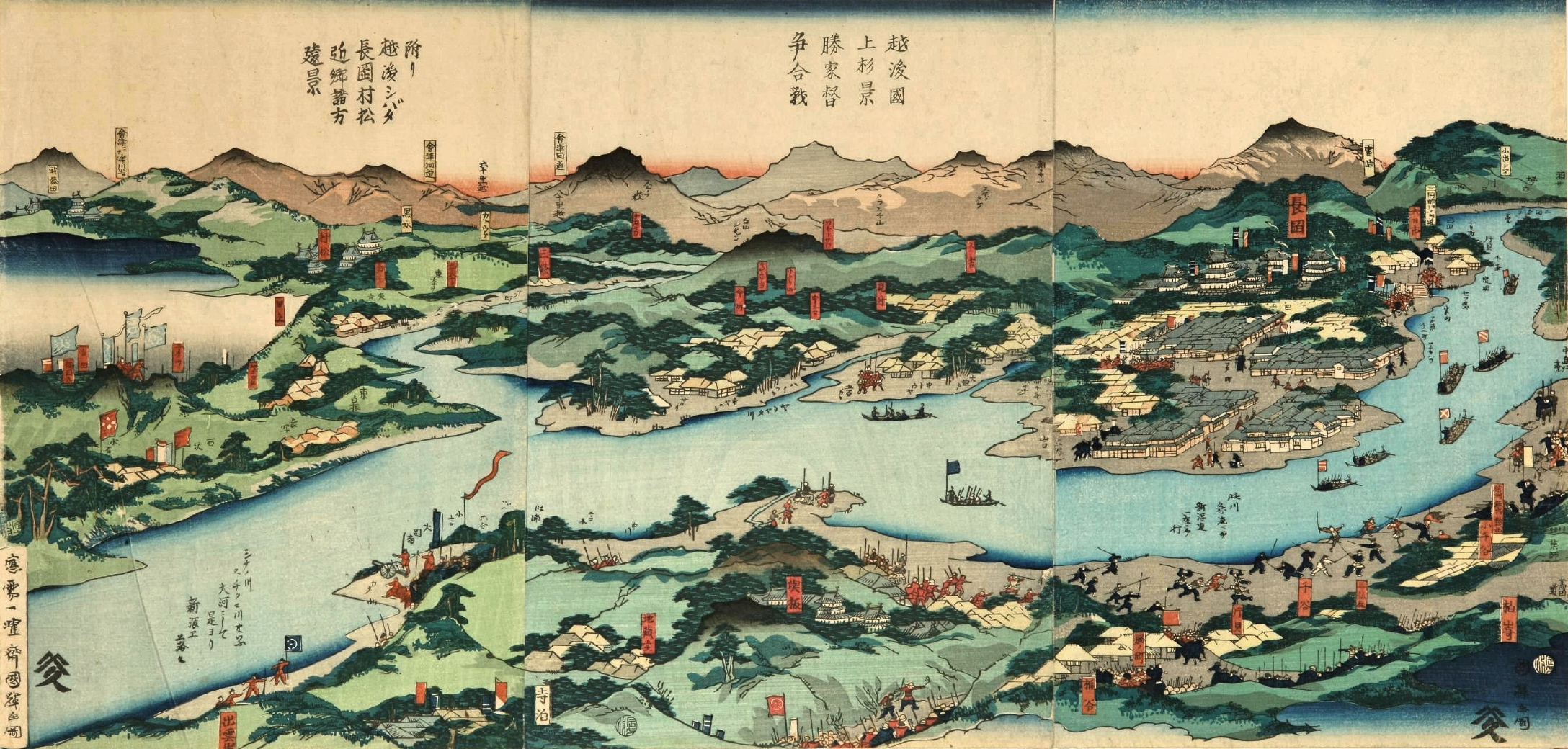
Ukiyo-e of the Battle of Hokuetsu (Boshin War) by Utagawa Kuniteru II

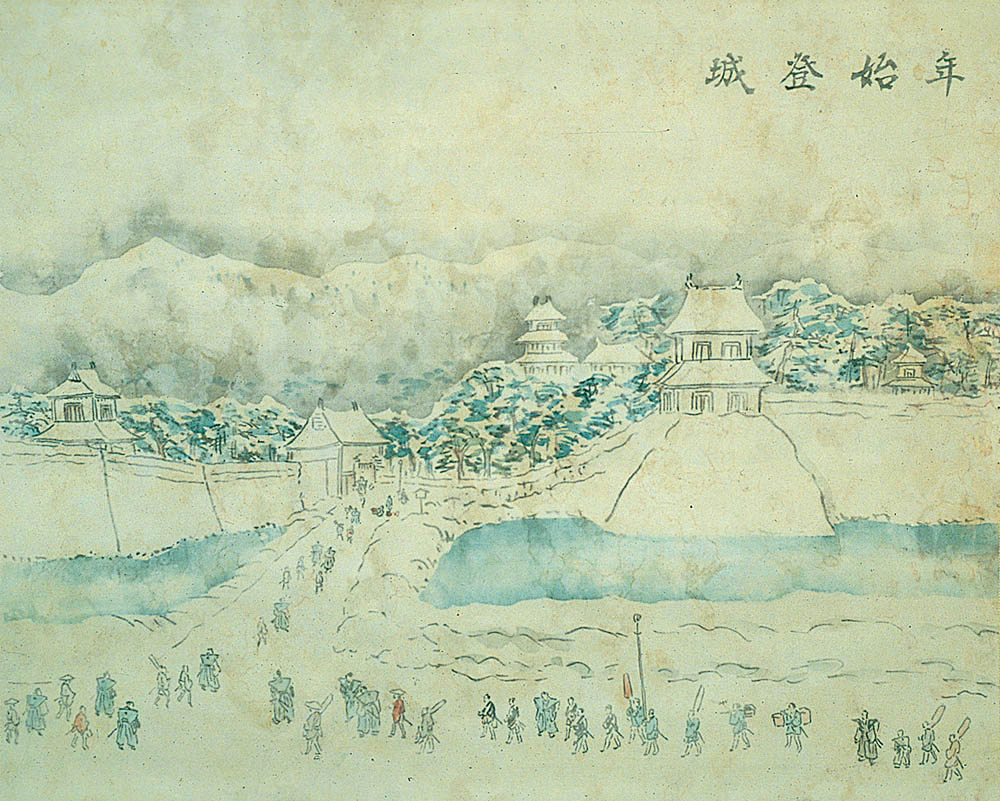
Picture of annual event of the Nagaoka castle – going into the castle for New Year greeting

The area of present-day Nagaoka was part of ancient Echigo Province. Under the Tokugawa shogunate, a castle town was constructed by Hori Naoyori lord of Nagaoka Domain in 1616. However, as the initial castle was located in an area prone to flooding by the Shinano River, a new castle was built at the site of present-day Nagaoka Station in 1617. Nagaoka flourished as under the reign of the 13 generations of the Makino clan during the Edo period. In the Boshin War of 1868 during the Meiji Restoration, Nagaoka Domain was a member of the Ōuetsu Reppan Dōmei against the imperial forces, and the city was reduced to rubble during the Battle of Hokuetsu. A gift of one hundred sacks of rice from a neighboring province was sold to finance a new school during the reconstruction of Nagaoka, from which the anecdote of Kome Hyappyo was born.

With the Meiji period creation of the modern municipalities system on April 1, 1889, the towns of Nagaoka and Nagaoka-honmachi were established. The two towns were merged on November 1, 1901 with the towns of Senju, Kusouzu, Ara, and village of Ouchi to form the modern town of Nagaoka, which was then raised to city status on April 1, 1906.

=== Municipal timeline ===
Yellow: 10 former municipalities merged into Nagaoka in the 2000s

- April 1, 1906: The city of Nagaoka is established.
- August 1, 1945: Nagaoka is reduced to rubble by 125 B-29 bombers in the Bombing of Nagaoka in World War II. 1,470 lives are lost.
- January 1963: A record-breaking heavy snowfall hits Nagaoka.
- November 15, 1982: Joetsu Shinkansen service arrives at Nagaoka Station.
- July 12–13, 2004: A heavy downpour causes extensive flooding in Nagaoka.
- October 23, 2004: The Chūetsu earthquake strikes, causing extensive damage in Nagaoka and surrounding areas.
- February 2005: Nagaoka experiences the heaviest snowfall in 19 years.
- April 1, 2005: The town of Oguni (from Kariwa District), the village of Yamakoshi (from Koshi District), the town of Nakanoshima (from Minamikanbara District), and the towns of Koshiji and Mishima (both from Santō District), were absorbed into Nagaoka.

Prior to the merger, the size of Nagaoka was 262.45 km^{2} and the population was 192,292.

- January 1, 2006: The city of Tochio, the towns of Teradomari and Yoita, and the village of Washima (all from Santō District) were absorbed into Nagaoka.
- April 1, 2007: Nagaoka is designated a special city with increase local autonomy
- March 31, 2010: The town of Kawaguchi (from Kitauonuma District) was absorbed into Nagaoka.

== Government ==
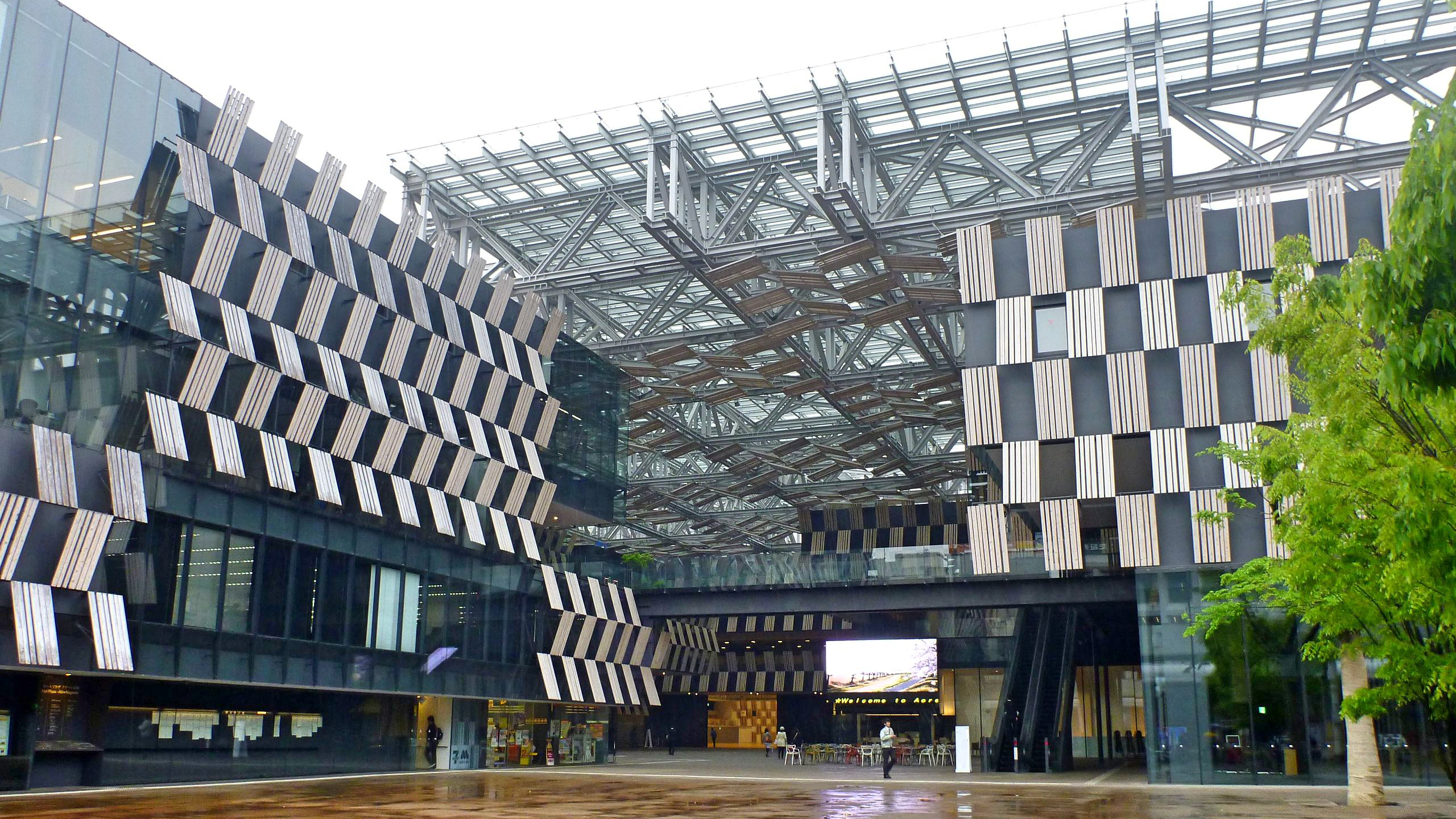
Nagaoka City Hall

Nagaoka has a mayor-council form of government with a directly elected mayor and a unicameral city legislature of 34 members. The city contributes six members to the Niigata Prefectural Assembly. In terms of national politics, the city is part of Niigata 5th district of the lower house of the Diet of Japan.

== Economy ==
=== Industry ===
The manufacturing industry prospered in Nagaoka following World War II, due in part to favorable location and good transportation infrastructure. Current industrial production includes precision instruments and machine tools.

- Nippon Seiki, a manufacturer of automotive instruments, is headquartered in Nagaoka.
- TDK-Lambda, a manufacturer of switched-mode power supplies, has a plant in Nagaoka.
- SLB, an oilfield services company, has a location in Nagaoka.

== Education ==
=== Universities and colleges ===
- Nagaoka Institute of Design
- Nagaoka University
- Nagaoka University of Technology
- National Institute of Technology, Nagaoka campus

=== Primary and secondary education ===
The city of Nagaoka operates 61 public elementary schools and 27 public middle schools. There is also one public middle school operated by the national government. Nagaoka also has nine public high schools operated by the Niigata Prefectural Board of Education and three private high schools. The prefecture also operates three special education schools in the city.

== Transportation ==
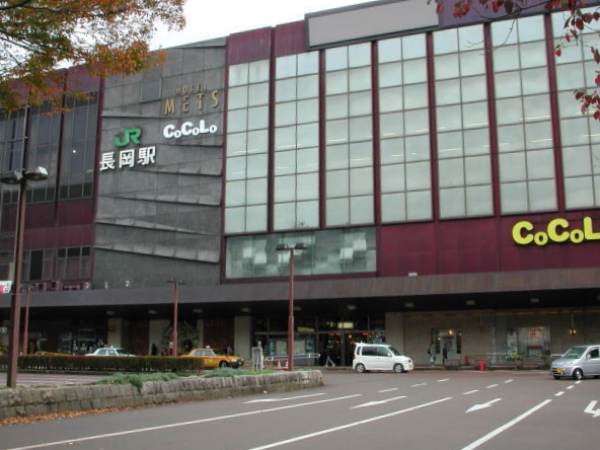
Nagaoka Station

=== Railway ===
East Japan Railway Company (JR East) – Joetsu Shinkansen

- Nagaoka

JR East – Joetsu Line

- Echigo-Kawaguchi – <Ojiya> – Echigo-Takiya – Miyauchi – Nagaoka

JR East – Shin'etsu Main Line

- Tsukayama – Echigo-Iwatsuka – Raikōji – Maekawa – Miyauchi – Nagaoka – Kita-Nagaoka – Oshikiri

JR East – Echigo Line

- Myōhōji – Ojimaya – Kirihara – Teradomari

JR East – Iiyama Line

- Echigo-Kawaguchi

=== Bus ===
Local bus service in Nagaoka is managed by Echigo Kotsu. The bus terminal located at the east entrance of Nagaoka Station serves as the hub for the route network. Service extends to all parts of the city as well as many outlying suburban areas and villages. A bus service connecting Nagaoka Station to Niigata, Niigata Station runs at intervals of approximately 30 minutes. Additionally, long-distance bus services are available to all major cities in the prefecture as well as Tokyo.

=== Road ===
==== Expressway ====
Nagaoka JCT is a strategic interchange which connects two expressways, Hokuriku Expressway and Kan-Etsu Expressway.

- Hokuriku Expressway – Ōzumi PA – Nagaoka JCT – Nagaoka-kita Bus stop – Nagaoka-kita IC(ETC Only) – Nakanoshima-Mitsuke IC
- Kan-etsu Expressway – Echigo-Kawaguchi IC/SA – Ojiya IC* – Nagaokaminami-Koshiji IC(ETC Only) – Nagaoka IC – Nagaoka JCT
- Ojiya IC is in Ojiya city

==== Japan National Route ====
- National Route 8
- National Route 17
- National Route 116
- National Route 117
- National Route 290
- National Route 291
- National Route 351
- National Route 352
- National Route 402
- National Route 403
- National Route 404
- National Route 460

== Sister cities ==
Nagaoka is twinned with:

- Fort Worth, Texas, United States, since 1987
- Honolulu, Hawaii, United States, since 2002
- Romainmôtier-Envy, Vaud, Switzerland, since 2006
- Taiarapu-Ouest, French Polynesia, since 1991
- Trier, Rhineland-Palatinate, Germany, since 2006

=== Friendship city ===
- Bamberg, Upper Franconia, Germany, since 1995

== Local attractions ==
=== Places of interest ===
- Haibu Nagaoka Stadium
- Kome Hyappyo Monument
- Nagaoka City Local Museum
- Nagaoka Lyric Hall
- National Government Echigo Hillside Park
- The Niigata Prefectural Museum of Modern Art
- Niigata Prefectural Museum of History
- Tsuginosuke Kawai Monument in Yukyuzan Park
- Yukyuzan Park

=== National Historic Sites ===
- Araya Site
- Fujihashi Site
- Hachimanbayashi Kanga ruins
- Tochio Castle ruins
- Umataka-Sanjūinaba Site
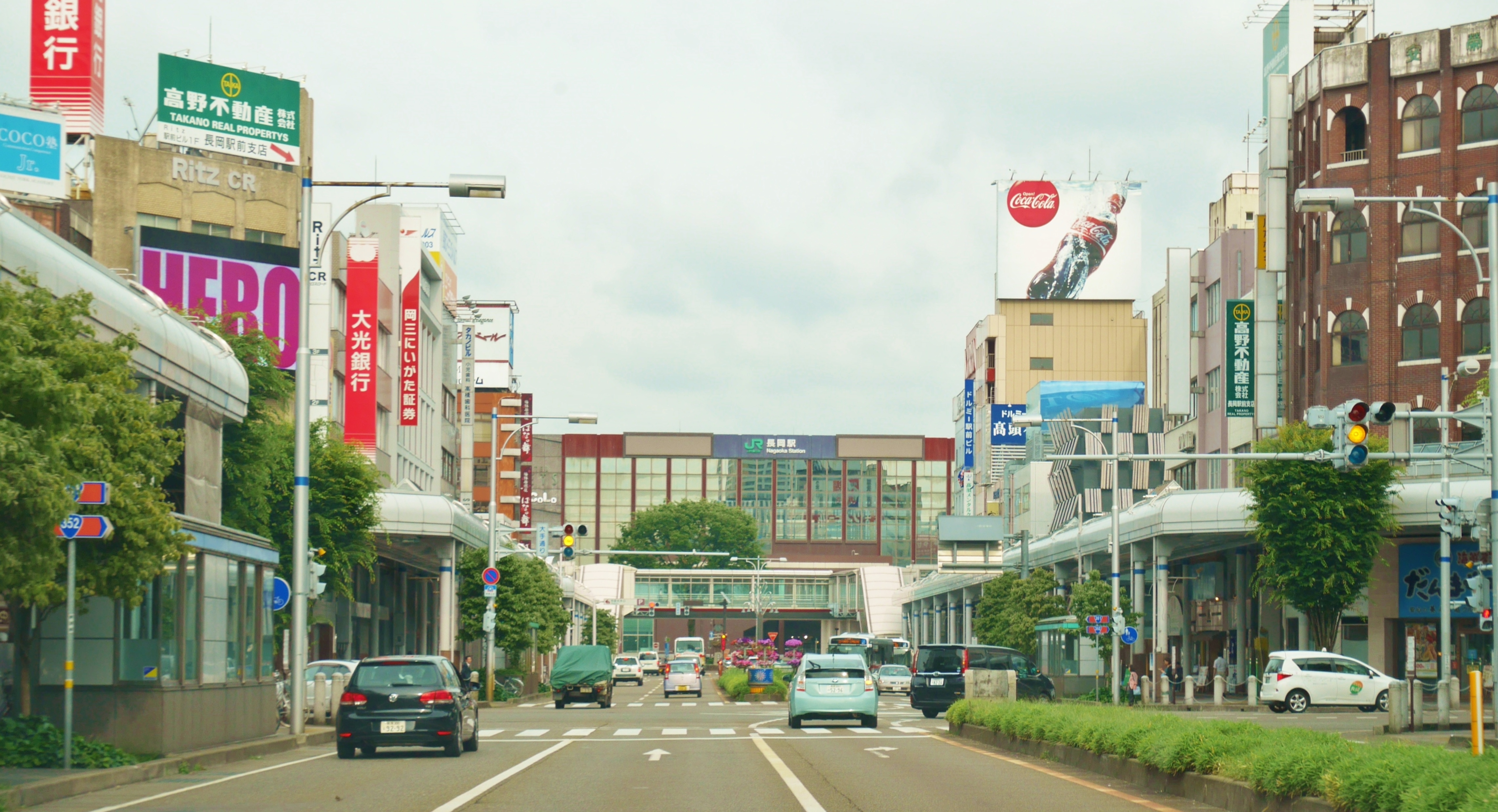
Ote-dori Street and Nagaoka Station

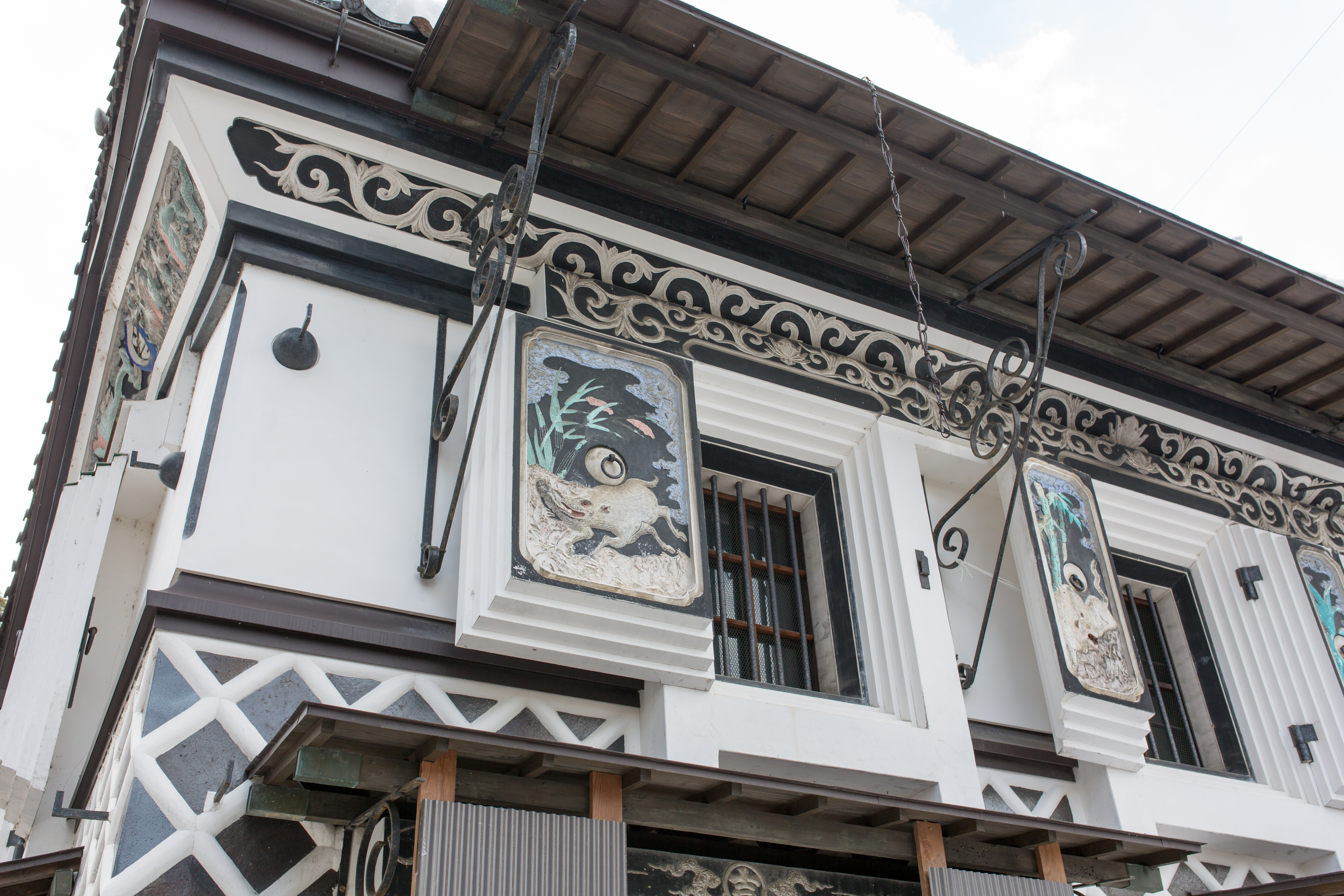
Quina Saffron Winery

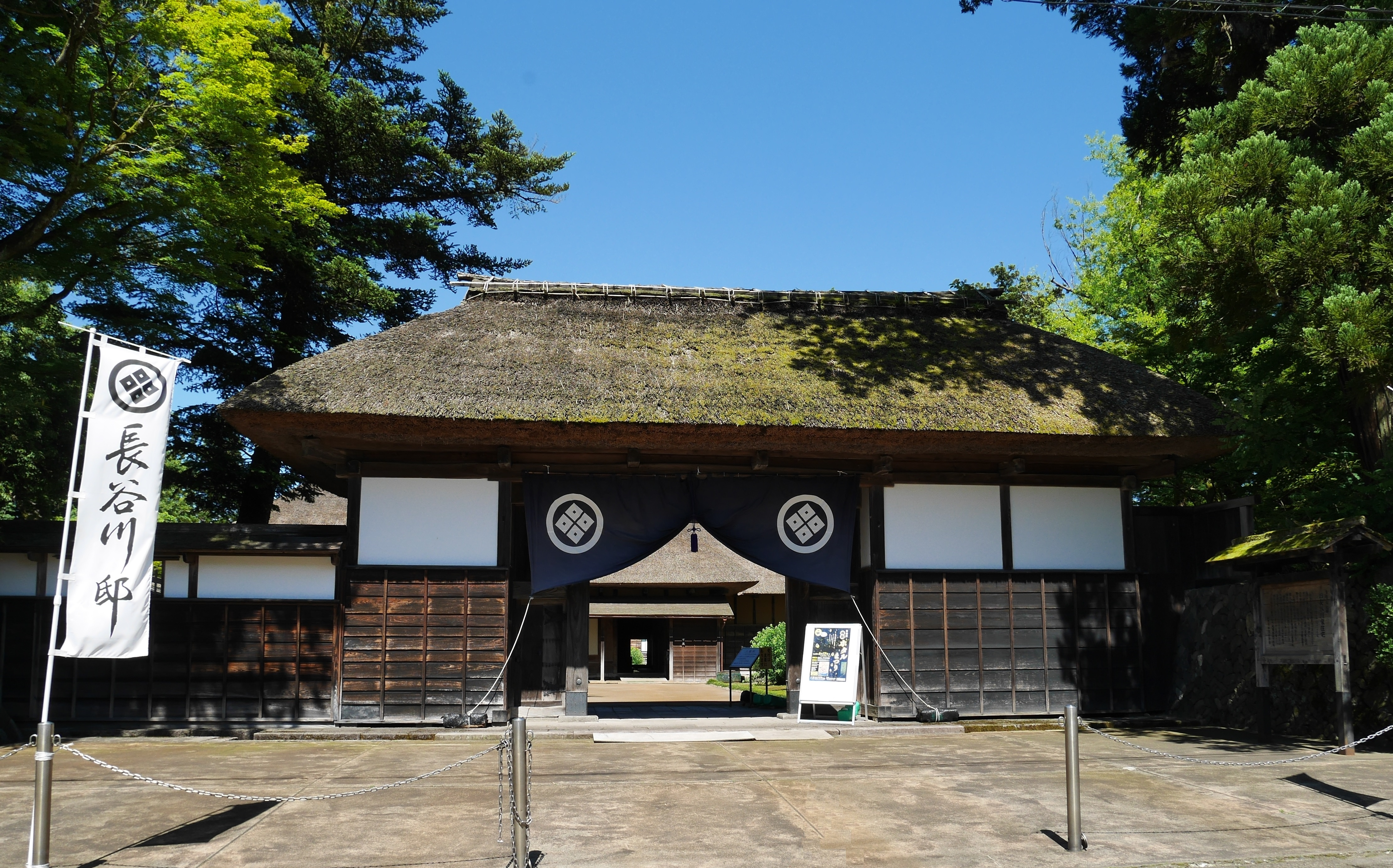
Hasegawa Family Residence

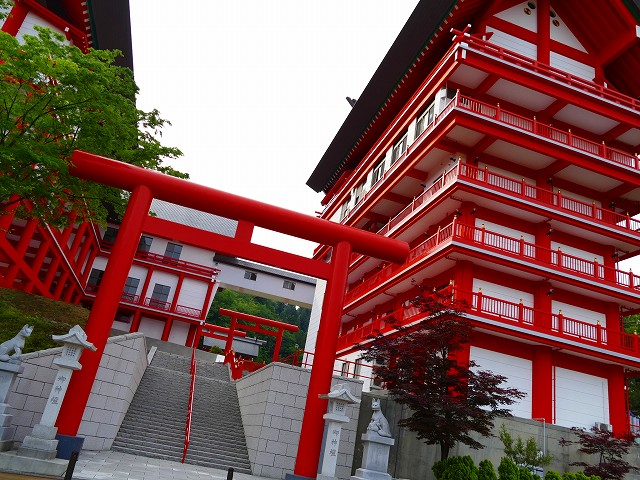
Houtokusan Inari Taisya Shrine

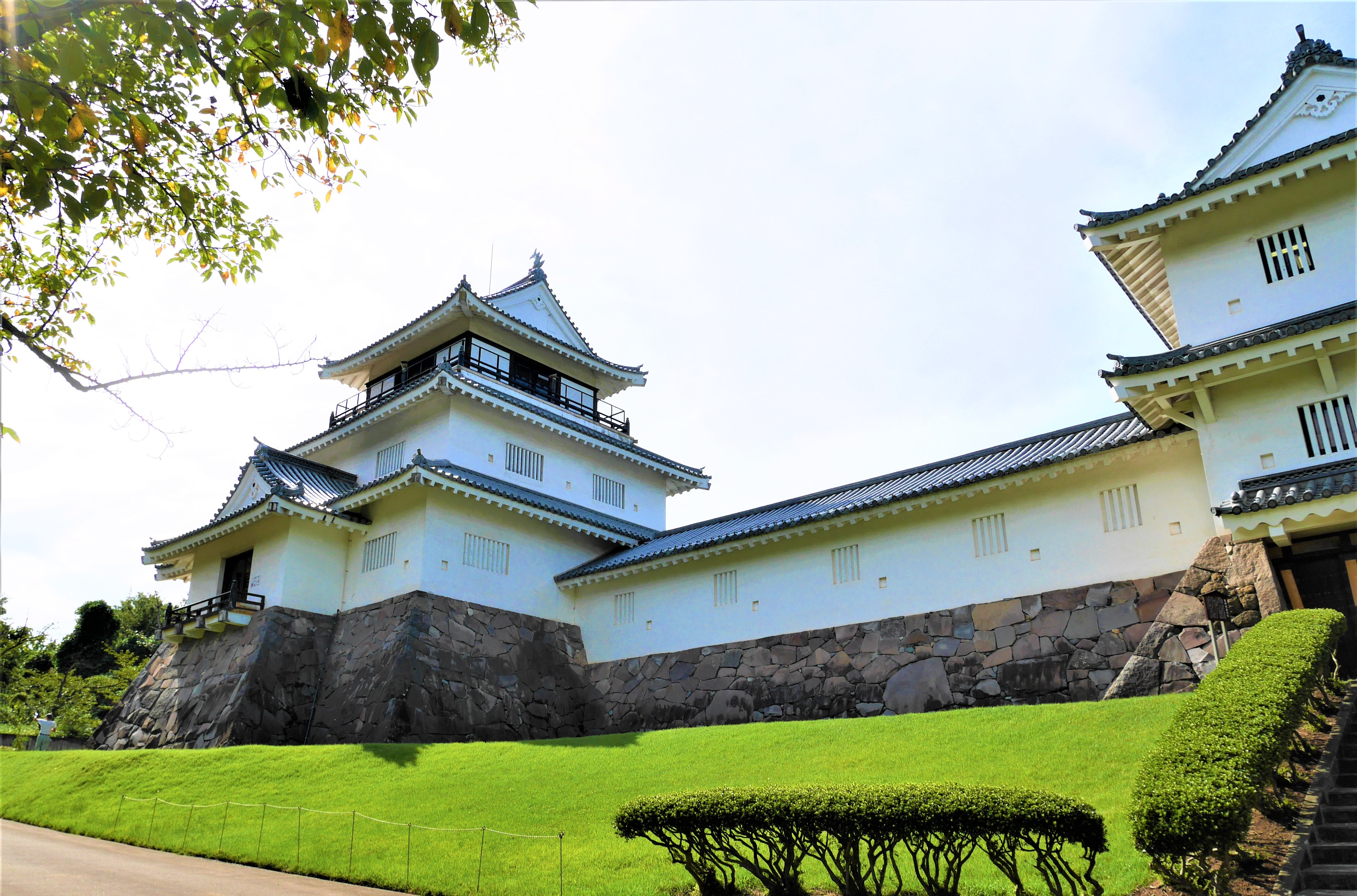
Nagaoka City Local Museum

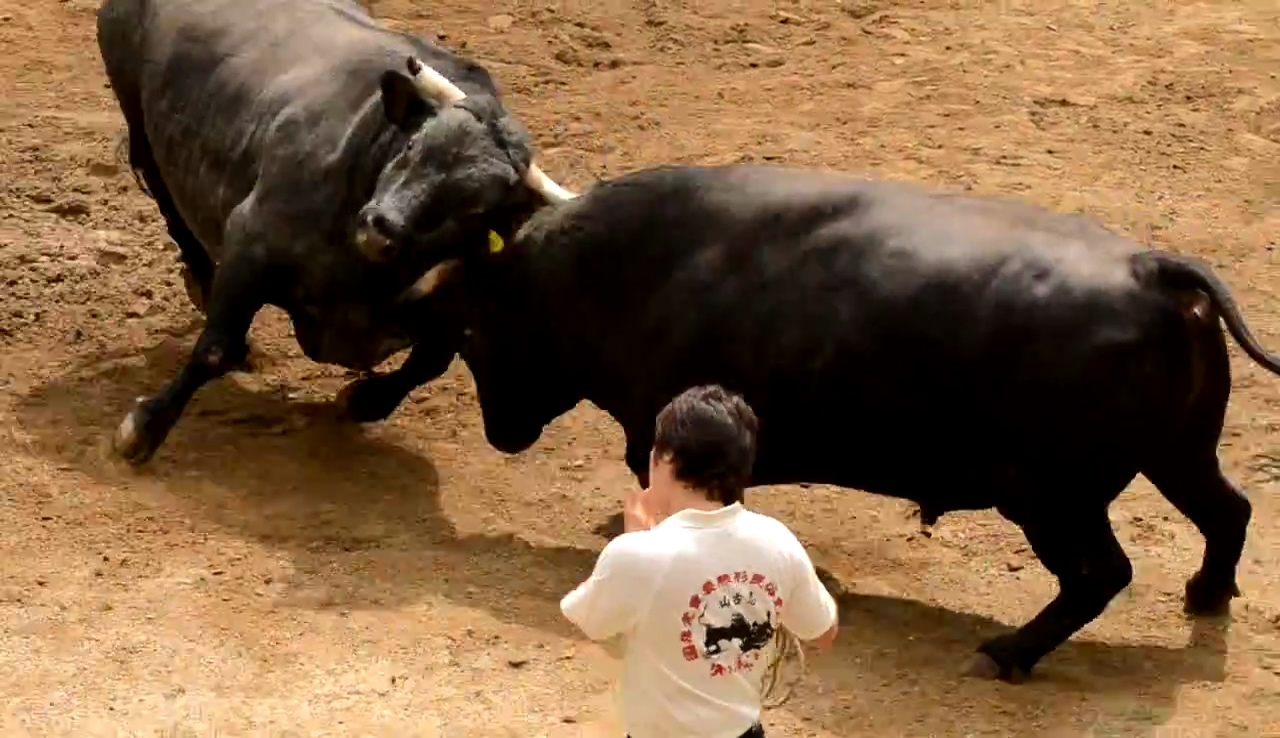
Bull wrestling in Yamakoshi

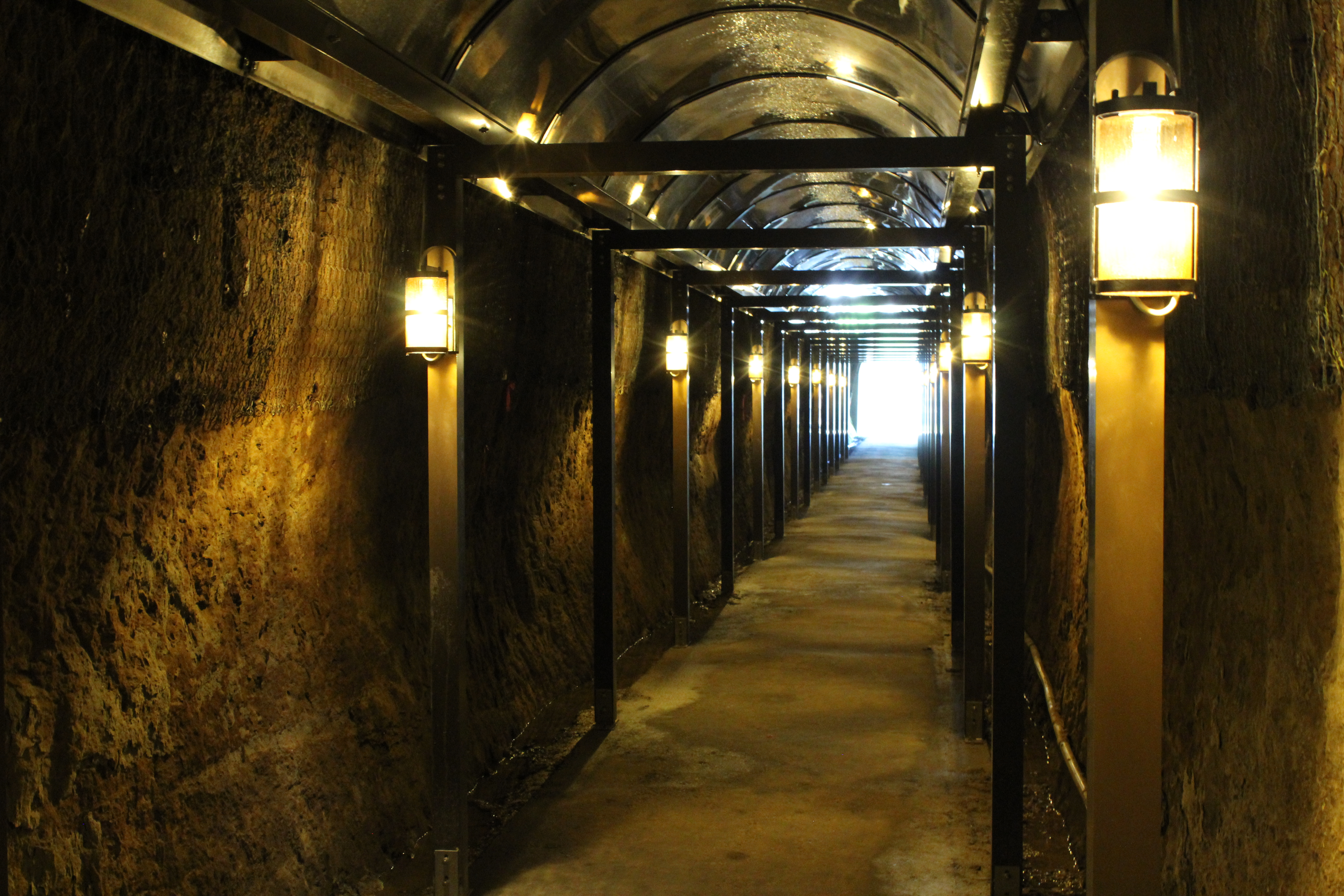
Nakayama tunnel

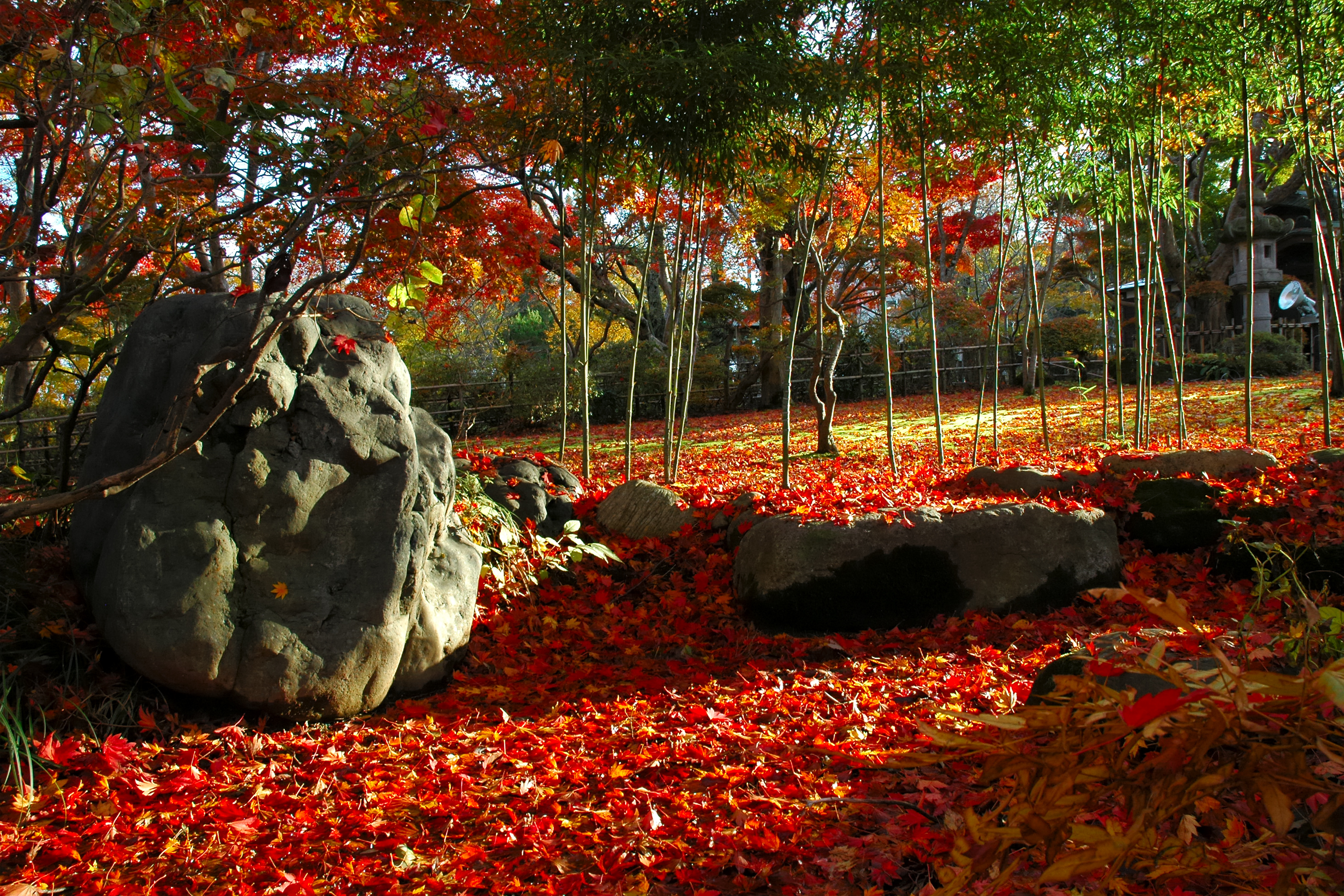
Momijien

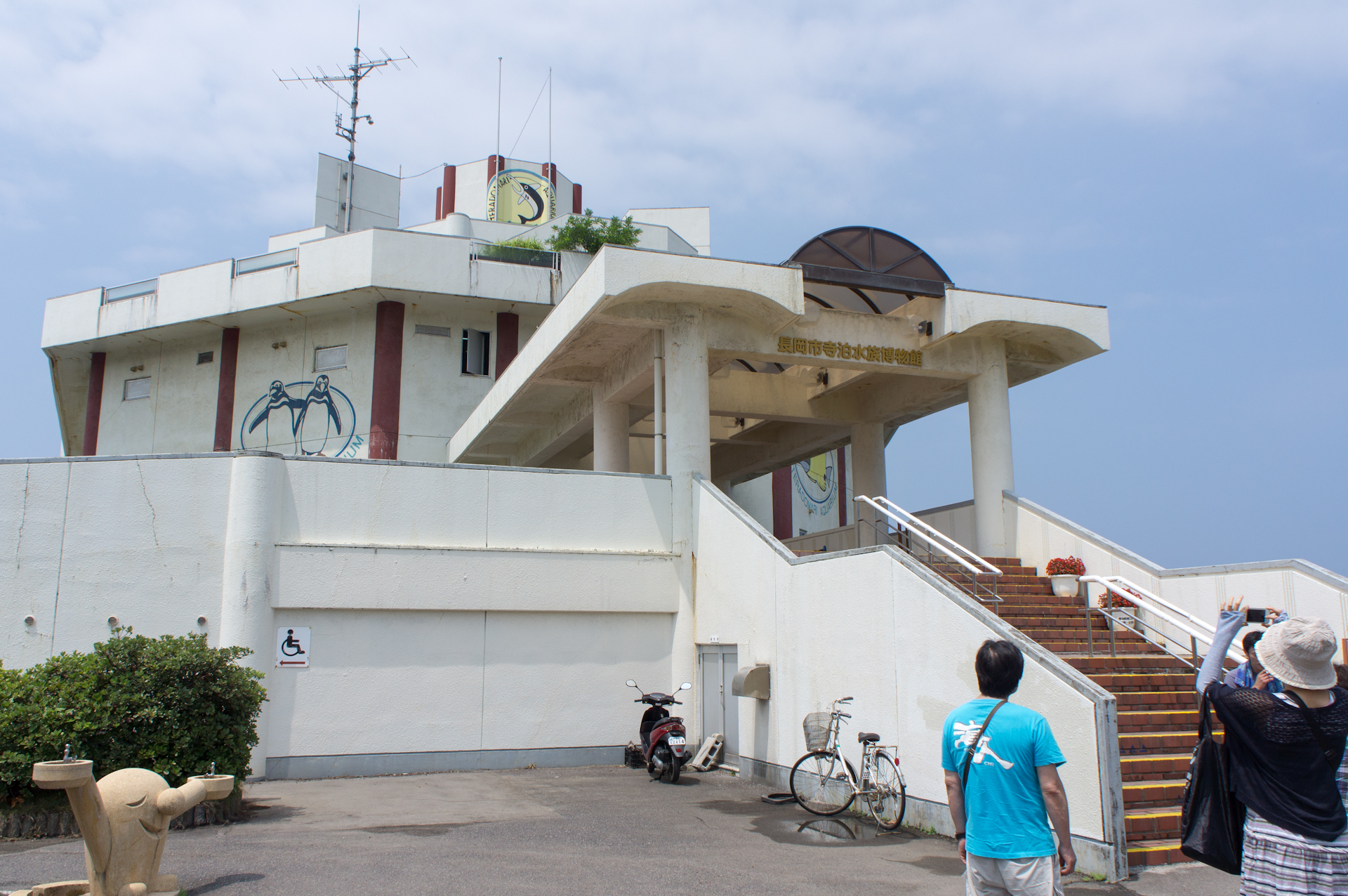
Teradomari Aquarium

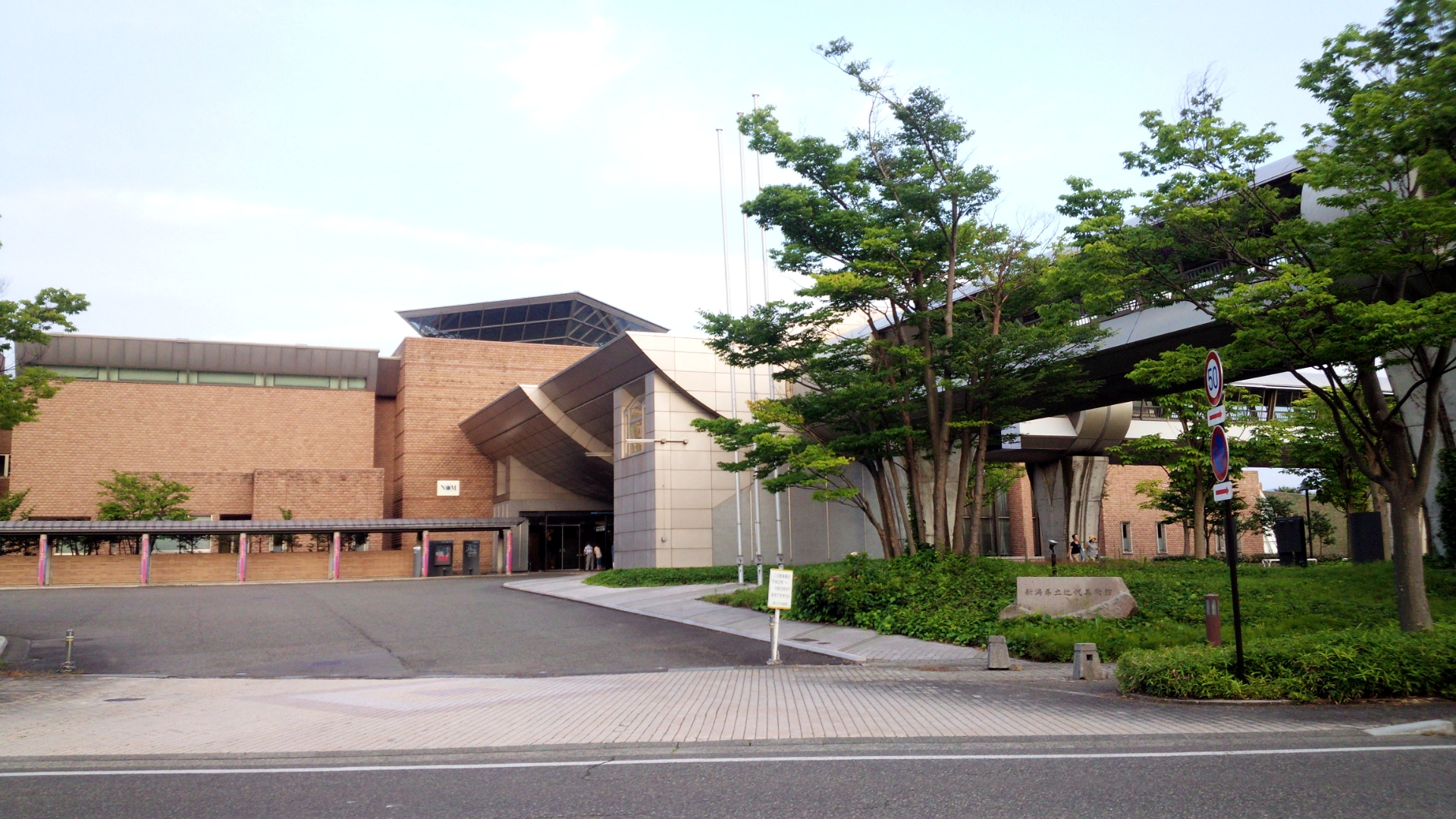
The Niigata Prefectural Museum of Modern Art

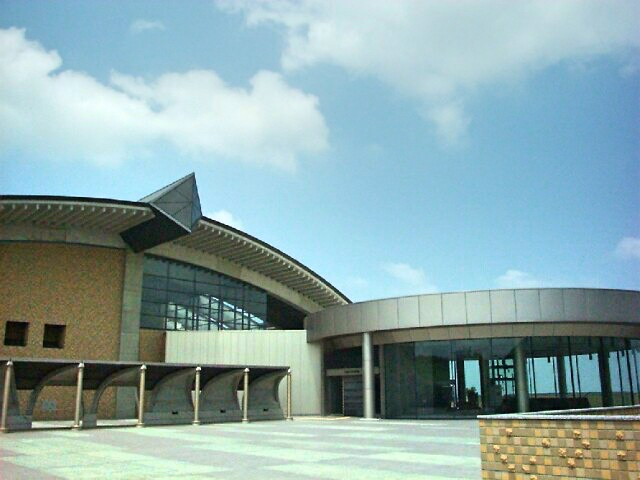
Niigata Prefectural Museum of History

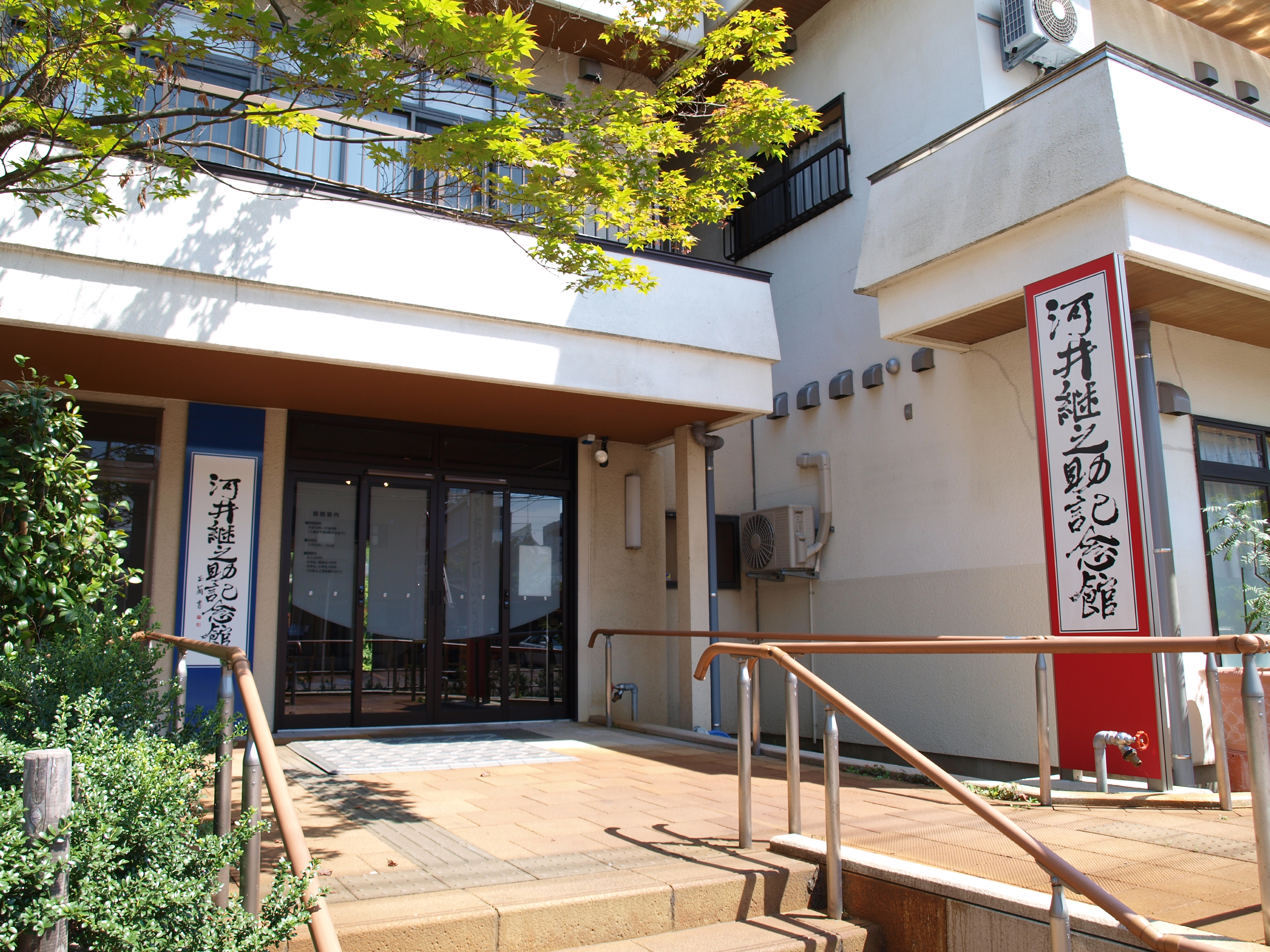
Kawai Tsuginosuke Memorial Museum

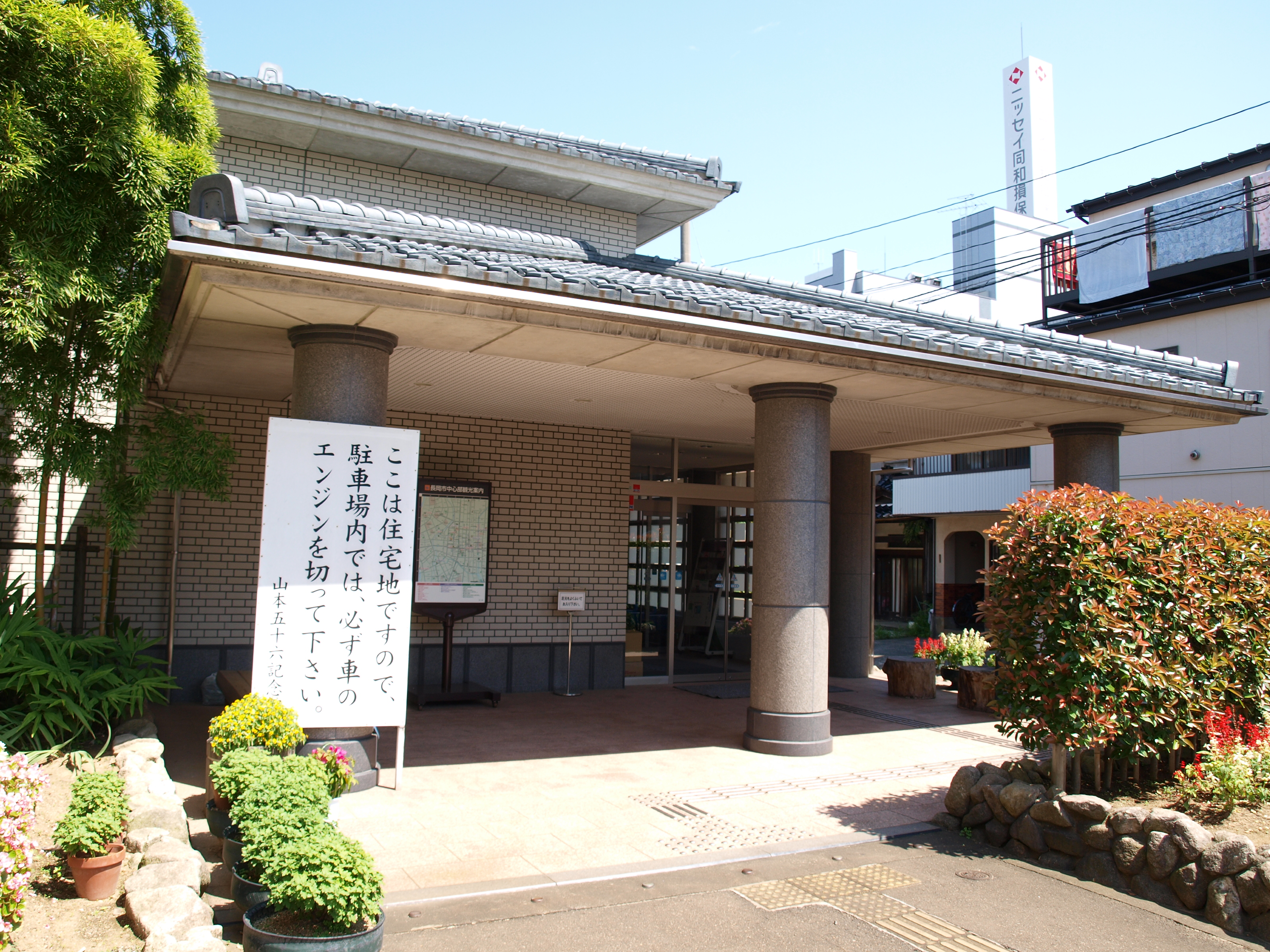
Yamamoto Isoroku Memorial Museum

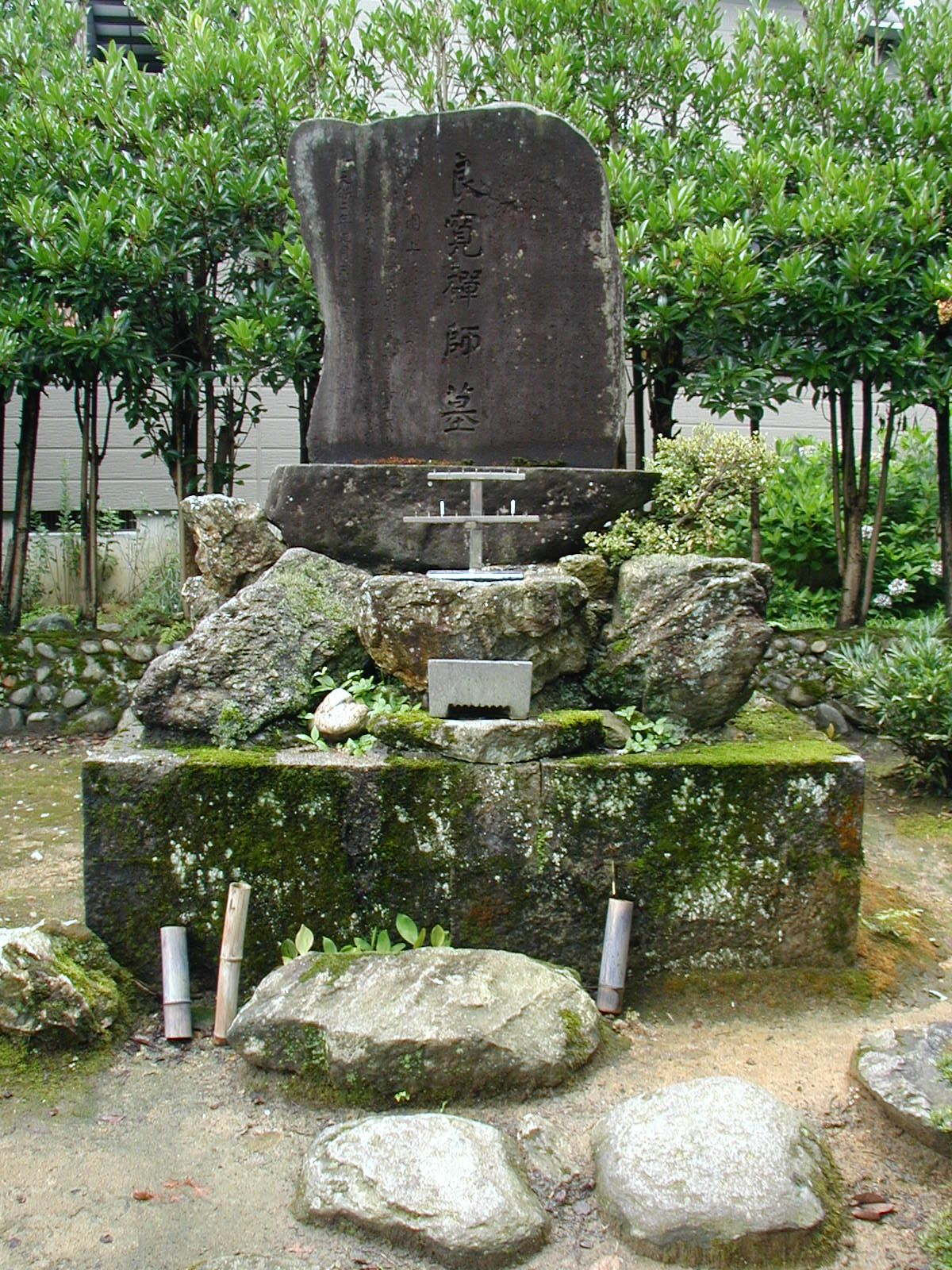
Ryōkan's grave (Ryusenji)

=== Festivals ===
Video: 100 shots of shakudama (12 inches shell) fireworks at the Nagaoka Festival Fireworks 2015

- Nagaoka Festival and Grand Fireworks Festival (August)
- Nagaoka Aki Matsuri (Autumn Festival) and Kome Hyappyo Festival (October)

== Notable people from Nagaoka ==
- El Desperado (professional wrestler)
- Inoue Enryō (Buddhist philosopher and founder of Toyo University)
- Ryō Hirohashi (voice actor)
- Tomoko Hoshino (actress)
- Yuki Kondo (mixed martial artist)
- Jūshirō Konoe (actor)
- Koharu Kusumi (Morning Musume)
- Haruo Minami (Enka singer)
- Etsu Inagaki Sugimoto (writer)
- Nobuhiro Watsuki (manga artist)
- Isoroku Yamamoto (Commander of the Imperial Japanese Navy from 1939 to 1943)
- Tomokazu Yoshida (former actor, acupuncturist)
