= Yoita, Niigata =

Yoita 与板町
- Former municipality
- Flag Seal
- Interactive map of Yoita
- Country: Japan
- Region: Hokuriku
- Prefecture: Niigata Prefecture
- Merged: January 1, 2006 (now part of Nagaoka)

Area
  - Total: 20.05 km^{2} (7.74 sq mi)

Population (2003)
  - Total: 7,380
- Time zone: UTC+09:00 (JST)

10 municipalities merged into Nagaoka City

Yoita (与板町, Yoita-machi) is a former town located in Santō District, Niigata Prefecture, Japan.

As of 2003, the town had an estimated population of 7,380 and a density of 368.08 persons per km^{2}. The total area was 20.05 km^{2}.

On January 1, 2006, Yoita lost its status as a town when it, along with the city of Tochio, the town of Teradomari, and the village of Washima (all from Santō District), was merged into the expanded city of Nagaoka.

== Transportation ==
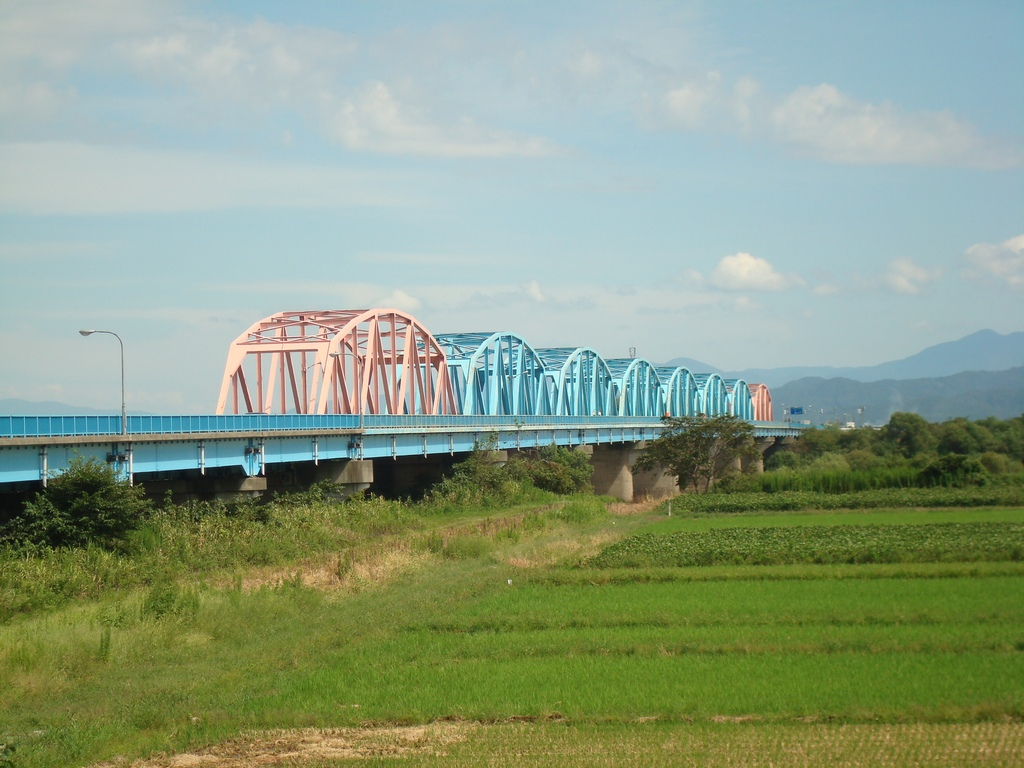
Yoita Bridge(ja:与板橋)

=== Railway ===
Echigo Kotsu Nagaoka Line(ja:越後交通長岡線) had been operated in the town until 1975.

=== Highway ===
- National Route 403

== See also ==
- Yoita Domain
