= Japan National Route 351 =

Road in Niigata prefecture, Japan

National Route 351
- 国道351号

Route information
- Length: 38.7 km (24.0 mi)

Location
- Country: Japan

Highway system
- National highways of Japan; Expressways of Japan
← National Route 350	→ National Route 352

National Route 351 is a national highway of Japan connecting Nagaoka, Niigata and Ojiya, Niigata in Japan, with a total length of 38.7 km (24.05 mi).
