= Echigo-Iwatsuka Station =

Railway station in Nagaoka, Niigata Prefecture, Japan

Echigo-Iwatsuka Station 越後岩塚駅
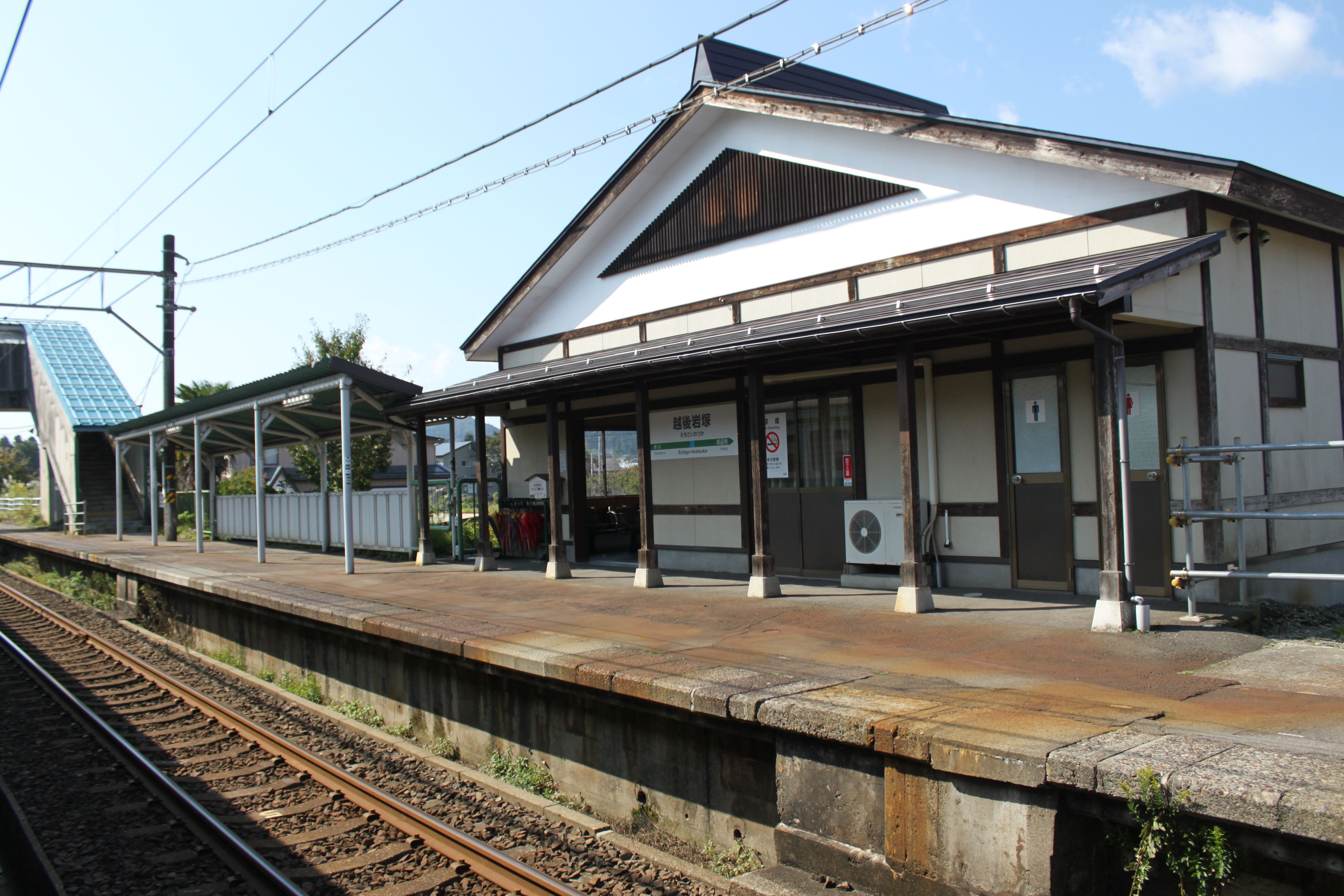
- Echigo-Iwatsuka Station, October 2011

General information
- Location: 1086 Iizuka, Nagaoka-shi, Niigata-ken 949-5414; Japan
- Coordinates: 37.3863°N 138.7565°E
- Operator: JR East
- Line: ■ Shin'etsu Main Line
- Platforms: 2 side platforms
- Tracks: 2

Other information
- Status: Unstaffed
- Website: Official website

History
- Opened: 1 June 1945; 81 years ago

Services
Preceding station	JR East	Following station
Tsukayama towards Naoetsu	Shin'etsu Main Line Local	Raikōji towards Niigata
Location
- Location within JR Shinetsu Main Line Location within Japan

Echigo-Iwatsuka Station (越後岩塚駅, Echigo-Iwatsuka-eki) is a railway station in the city of Nagaoka, Niigata, Japan, operated by East Japan Railway Company (JR East).

== Lines ==
Echigo-Iwatsuka Station is served by the Shin'etsu Main Line and is 60.5 kilometers from the terminus of the line at Naoetsu Station.

== Station layout ==
The station consists of two ground-level opposed side platforms connected by a footbridge serving two tracks. The station is unattended.

=== Platforms ===
1	■ Shin'etsu Main Line	for Nagaoka, Niigata
2	■ Shin'etsu Main Line	for Kashiwazaki, Naoetsu

== History ==
Echigo-Iwatsuka Station opened on 1 June 1945. With the privatization of Japanese National Railways (JNR) on 1 April 1987, the station came under the control of JR East.

== Surrounding area ==
- Iwatsuka Post Office
- Hotokusan Inari Taisha

== See also ==
- List of railway stations in Japan
