= Nagaoka Institute of Design =

Coordinates: 37°27′59.6″N 138°49′51.1″E

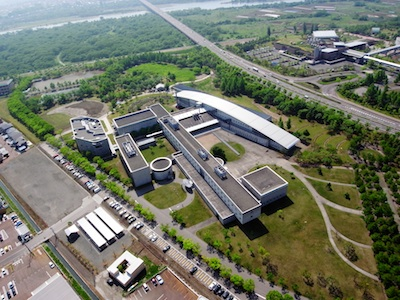
Overview of NID campus

The Nagaoka Institute of Design (長岡造形大学, Nagaoka zōkei daigaku) is a public university in Nagaoka, Niigata, Japan. It was established in 1994.
