= Kariwa District, Niigata =

District in Niigata prefecture, Japan

Coordinates: 37.4203°N 138.644°E

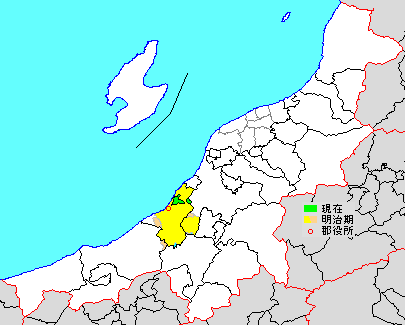
Map showing original extent of Kariwa District in Niigata Prefecture: * yellow - areas formerly within the district borders during the early Meiji period * green - current borders: 1. Kariwa-mura

Kariwa (刈羽郡, Kariwa-gun) is a district located in Niigata Prefecture, Japan.

As of July 1, 2019, the district has an estimated population of 4,578 with a density of 174 persons per km^{2}. The total area is 26.27 km^{2}.

== Municipalities ==
The district consists of only one village:

- Kariwa (Note: Classified as a village.)

== History ==
The district (excluding the west side of Kashiwazaki) was once part of the now-defunct Koshi District until the Heian period when the district was created under the name of Mishima District. Prior to the split, Mishima District covered the cities of Kashiwazaki (excluding the western part of the city, being the areas of Agewa (Kamiwa), Takaze (Takahane) and Warabino from the former municipality of Kakizaki) and Nagaoka (parts of the former towns of Oguni and Koshiji), and the village of Kariwa. When Santō District split off from Koshi District during the Edo period, Mishima was renamed to Kariwa.

In 1940, the town of Kashiwazaki became a city. After Kashiwazaki merged the surrounding areas, the district continued on to shrink. On April 1, 2005, the town of Oguni merged into the city of Nagaoka; and a month later, the towns of Nishiyama and Takayanagi merged into the city of Kashiwazaki. With this merger, Kariwa District has only the village of Kariwa left.

=== Recent mergers ===
- On April 1, 2005 - The town of Oguni was merged into the expanded city of Nagaoka.
- On May 1, 2005 - The towns of Nishiyama and Takayanagi were merged into the expanded city of Kashiwazaki.
