= Japan National Route 404 =

Road in Niigata prefecture, Japan

National Route 404
- 国道404号

Route information
- Length: 95.7 km (59.5 mi)

Location
- Country: Japan

Highway system
- National highways of Japan; Expressways of Japan
← National Route 403	→ National Route 405

National Route 404 is a national highway of Japan connecting Nagaoka, Niigata and Jōetsu, Niigata in Japan, with a total length of 95.7 km (59.47 mi).
