= Santō District, Niigata =

District in Niigata prefecture, Japan

Coordinates: 37.5291°N 138.706°E

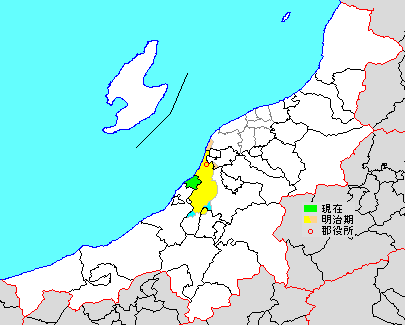
Map showing original extent of Santō District in Niigata Prefecture: * yellow - areas formerly within the district borders during the early Meiji period * green - current borders: 1. Izumozaki-machi

Santō (三島郡, Santō-gun) is a district located in Niigata Prefecture, Japan.

As of July 1, 2019, the district has an estimated population of 4,190 with a density of 94.4 persons per km^{2}. The total area is 44.38 km^{2}.

== Municipalities ==
The district consists of only one town:

- Izumozaki (Note: Classified as a town.)

== History ==
- Before the Edo Period, Santō District was part of the now-defunct Koshi District.

=== Recent mergers ===
- On April 1, 2005 - The towns of Koshiji and Mishima were merged into the expanded city of Nagaoka.
- On January 1, 2006 - The towns of Teradomari and Yoita, and the village of Washima were also merged into the expanded city of Nagaoka.
