= Minamikanbara District, Niigata =

District in Niigata prefecture, Japan

Coordinates: 37.7015°N 139.069°E

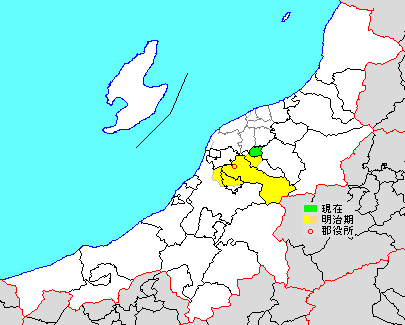
Map showing original extent of Minamikanbara District in Niigata Prefecture: * yellow - areas formerly within the district borders during the early Meiji period * green - current borders: 1. Tagami-machi

Minamikanbara (南蒲原郡, Minamikanbara-gun) is a district located in Niigata Prefecture, Japan.

As of July 1, 2019, the district had an estimated population of 11,481 with a density of 362 persons per km^{2}. The total area was 31.71 km^{2}.

== Municipalities ==
The district consists of only one town:

- Tagami (Note: Classified as a town.)

== History ==
When the district was formed back in the Meiji Period, the district covered the cities of Sanjō and Mitsuke, the town of Tagami, and parts of Kamo and the northern part of Nagaoka.

=== District Timeline ===
- On January 1, 1934 - The former town of Sanjō (part of the new city of Sanjō) gained city status.
- On 1954 - The cities of Mitsuke and Kamo were formed by merging the surrounding areas, including the former respective towns of Mitsuke and Kamo.

=== Recent mergers ===
- On April 1, 2005 - The town of Nakanoshima was merged into the expanded city of Nagaoka.
- On May 1, 2005 - The town of Sakae and the village of Shitada merged with the city of Sanjō to create a new city of Sanjō.
