= Kanzuri =

Japanese fermented chili paste

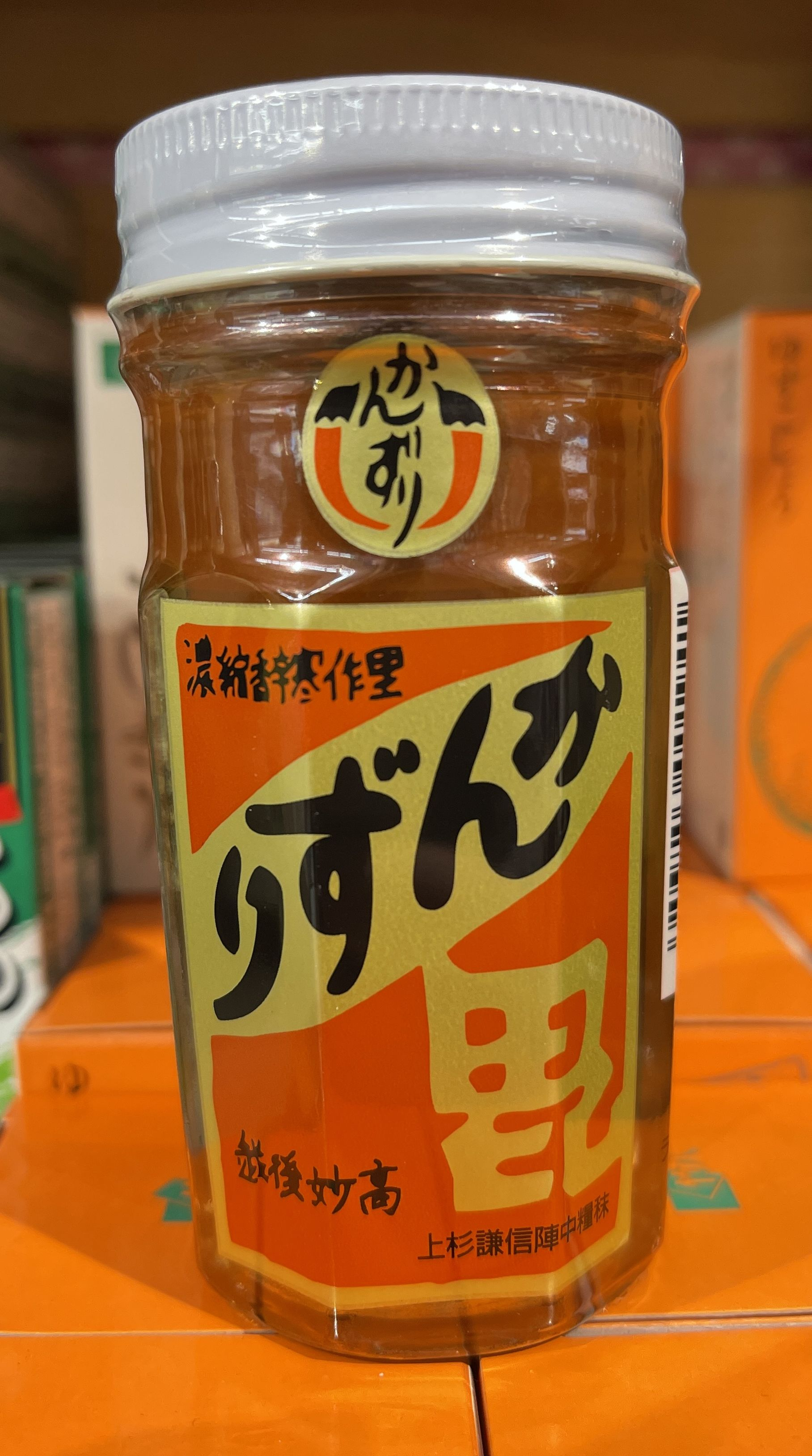
- A jar of kanzuri on display at a Marukai Market in West Covina
- Type: Paste
- Place of origin: Japan
- Region or state: Niigata Prefecture
- Associated cuisine: Japanese

Kanzuri (寒(かん)造(ず)里(り); [kaɰ̃zɯɾi] KAHN-zoo-ri) is a type of Japanese fermented chili paste manufactured in Niigata Prefecture. Originally a traditional condiment from the Jōetsu region, the name "kanzuri" was trademarked in 1966 by the Kanzuri, Co. Ltd. of Myōkō, the sole maker of the product.

== Description ==
Kanzuri is a chili paste with a bright red color. Its texture and flavor are similar to that of yuzu koshō, which is prepared with the identical principal ingredients, but kanzuri has a milder flavor that is sweeter and less salty. The flavor of kanzuri is also comparable to that of Tabasco sauce or doubanjiang.

== Production ==
The process to make kanzuri typically takes approximately three to four years. The ingredients used are tōgarashi, yuzu, salt, and kōji mold.

Production begins in April of the first year with the planting of the tōgarashi used for kanzuri. The particular cultivar used for the making of kanzuri is known as S-30; it is locally grown and about three times larger than other tōgarashi. These S-30 tōgarashi are harvested in the summer. The crop is rinsed with sea water, ground with yuzu and kōji mold, then left to ferment in barrels. In June or July, prior to the onset of peak summer heat, the barrels of fermenting tōgarashi are exposed to the air. This takes place from August until November. During the coldest part of the year, typically around 20 January, the tōgarashi are then laid out on snow to dry for several days in a traditional process known as kanzarashi or yukisarashi (Japanese: 雪さらし). This is repeated several times until March. Exposure to the snow increases the potency of the tōgarashi's flavor and removes excess salt and bitterness. This process is repeated each year, after which the kanzuri is bottled and shipped to market.

Different varieties of kanzuri may take longer to ferment, with one variety taking as long as six years.

Kanzuri was trademarked by Kanzuri, Co. Ltd. of Myōkō, Niigata in 1966, who later also trademarked the name in China, South Korea, and the United States. They are the exclusive makers of kanzuri.

== Uses ==
Traditionally, people from the Jōetsu region, which is known in Japan for its heavy snowfall, used kanzuri as a condiment that was thought to help warm up body temperature.

Today, kanzuri is used in a wide variety of dishes, including ramen, miso soup, yakiniku, nabemono, nattō, and pasta. It can also be dissolved into wasabi or tare, as well as be eaten as a complement to tsukemono. It is also used as a seasoning in snacks including kaki no tane, senbei, Kappa Ebisen, instant yakisoba, ramen, and chorizo.

According to Tōjō Kuniaki, the current president of Kanzuri, Co. Ltd., restaurateurs and chefs in Japan often use kanzuri as a "great supporting actor" and "secret ingredient" in their dishes. They have reported to him that kanzuri helps to mitigate the oiliness of a dish or to brighten its flavor.

== History ==
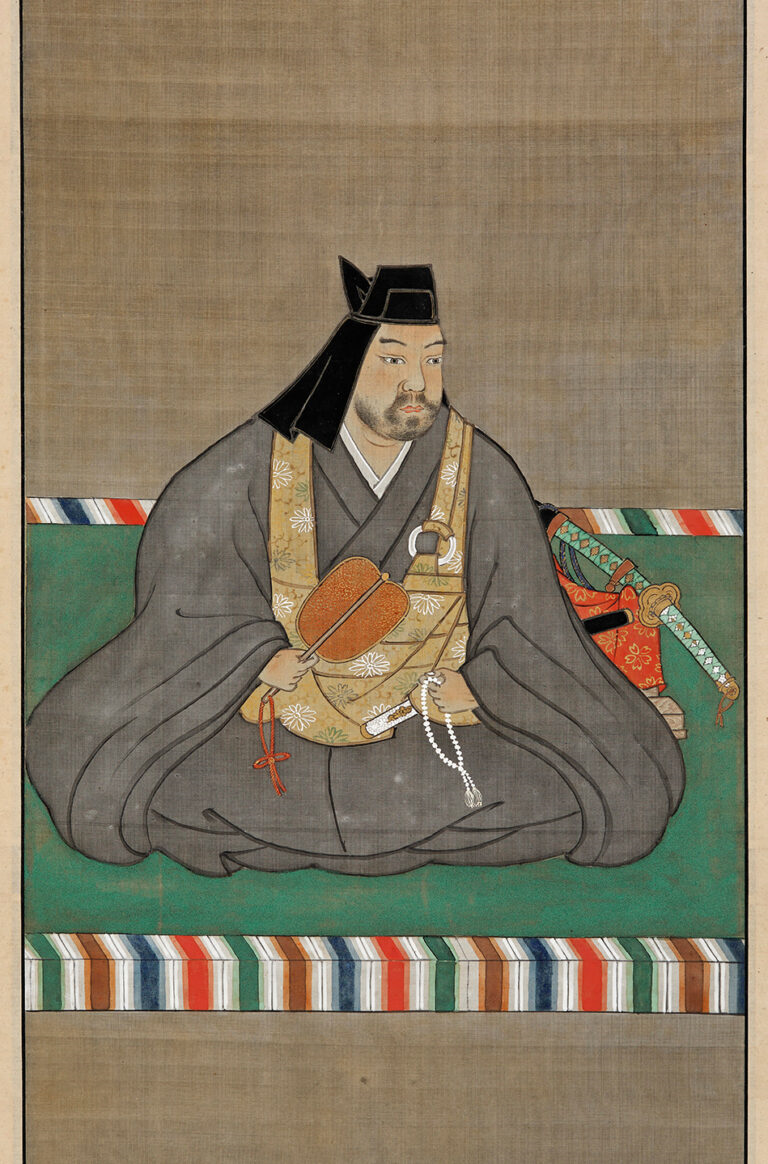
Folk tradition in the Jōetsu region ascribes Uesugi Kenshin (pictured) with the local introduction of the tōgarashi used for kanzuri.

Local legend in Jōetsu ascribes the origin of kanzuri to Uesugi Kenshin, who is said to have introduced tōgarashi to the region from Kyoto. Kanzuri was originally made by grinding tōgarashi together with miso paste.

The modern manufacturing of kanzuri began after the Pacific War. At the time, traditional food culture was rapidly disappearing in Japan, which during its postwar economic surge became Westernized. Tōjō Kuniji, the founder of what later became the official maker of kanzuri, deplored the situation, and told his son that he had to protect the heritage of kanzuri. He began to research methods of making kanzuri and sought to replicate homemade kanzuri for the domestic market. After graduating high school, his son Kuniaki joined him in his efforts.

A breakthrough came when Kuniaki was sent to the United States as part of an agricultural study-abroad program for his university. As he and his fellow students dined on steak on one occasion, he procured a jar of kanzuri that he had brought with him from home. He invited others to try it and their positive reaction strengthened his resolve to popularize kanzuri. When he returned, he co-founded Kanzuri, Co. Ltd. in Myōkō with his father and trademarked the name "kanzuri".

Local elderly women were recruited to help with the manufacturing of kanzuri and produce the right flavor. At first, he sold his kanzuri door-to-door to neighbors. Although his efforts were derided at the time, kanzuri became popular and the company a success. It currently makes approximately 20 tons of kanzuri per year.

Both kanzuri and the process of yukisarashi have become popular tourist attractions in Myōkō.
