= Niigata Prefecture =

Prefecture of Japan

Coordinates: 37°37′N 138°52′E

Niigata Prefecture 新潟県
- Prefecture

Japanese transcription(s)
  - Japanese: 新潟県
  - Rōmaji: Niigata-ken
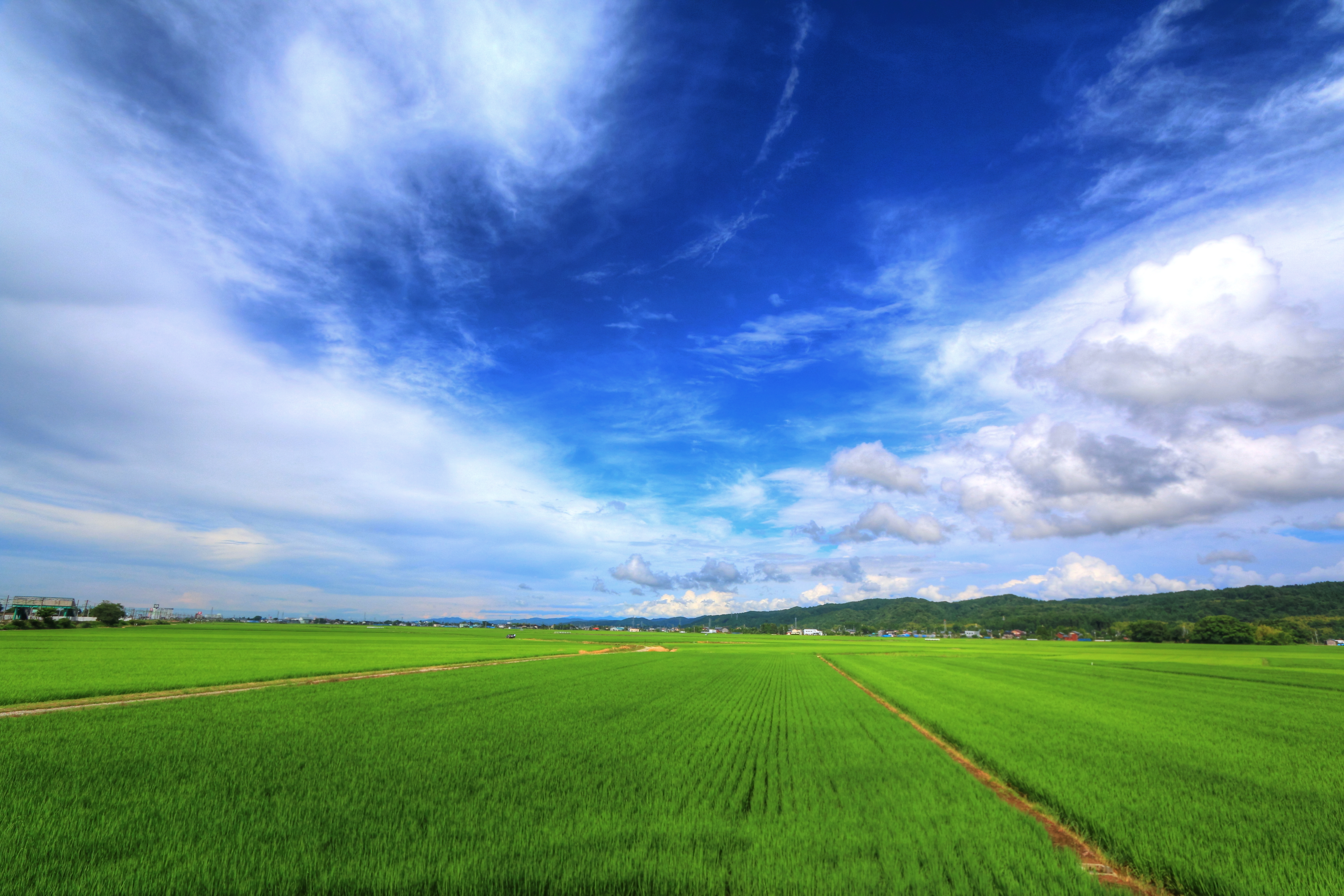
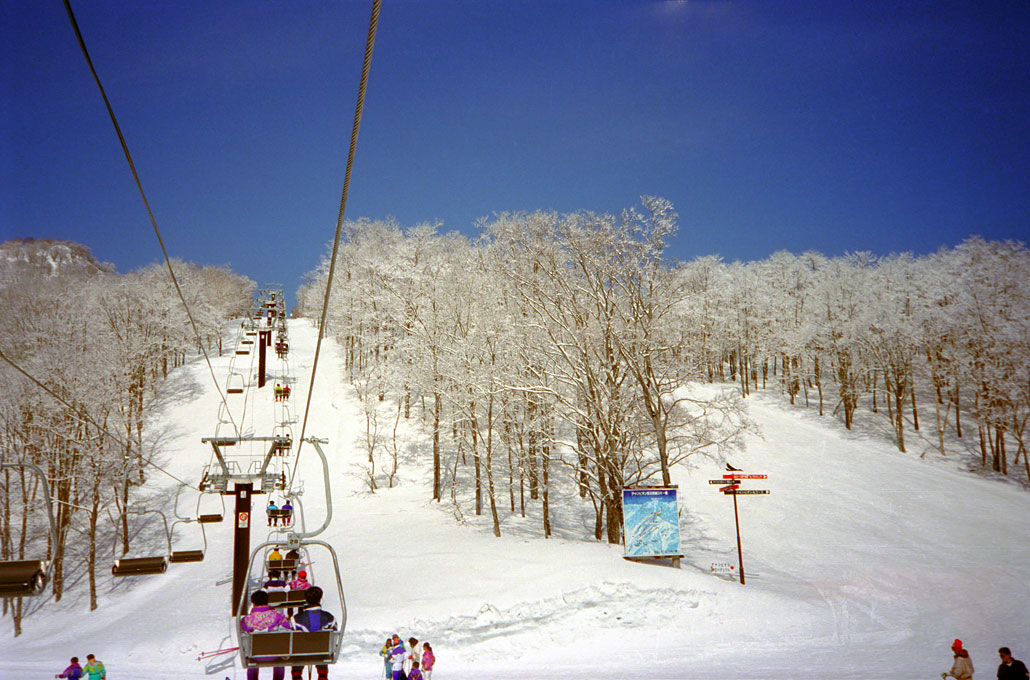
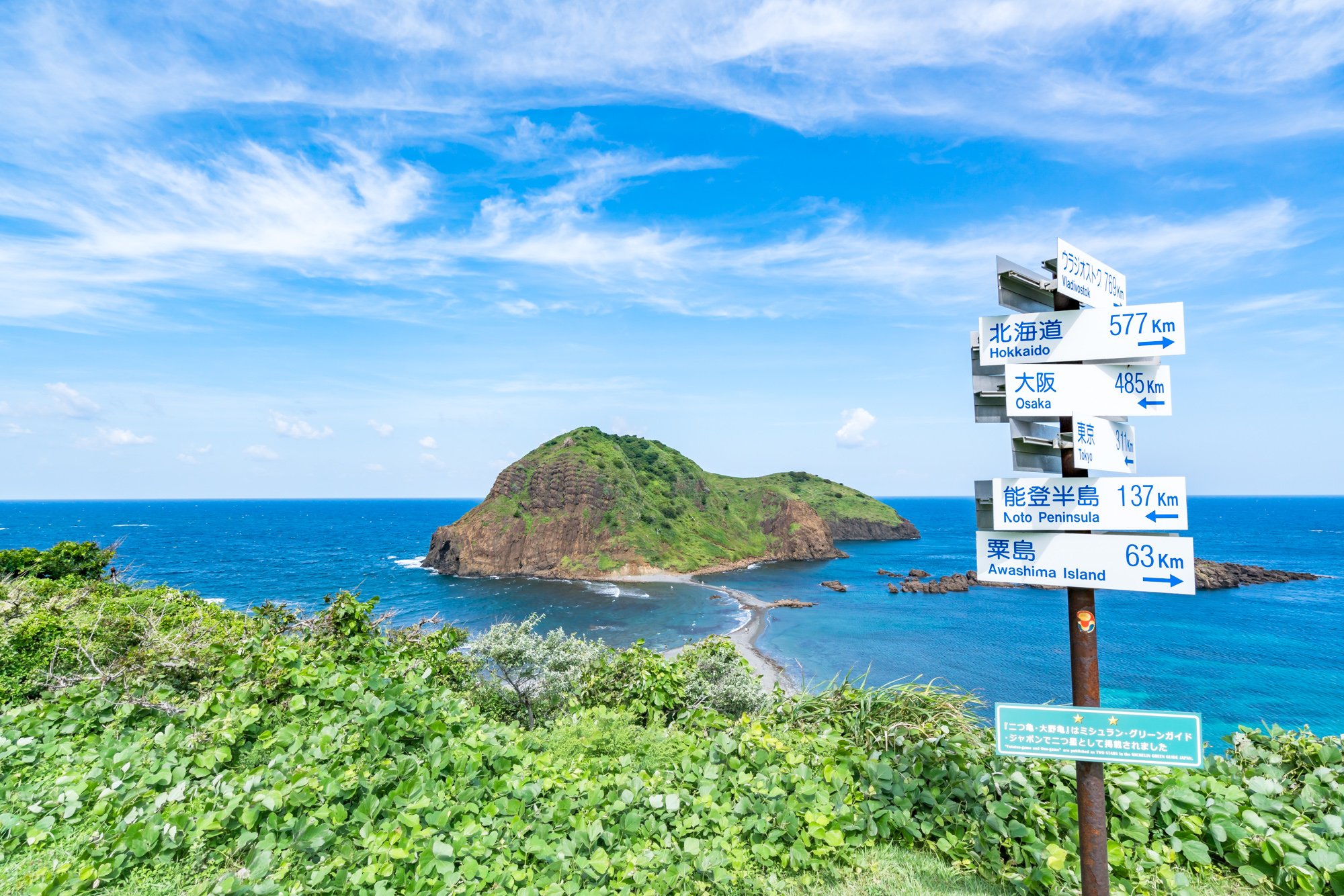
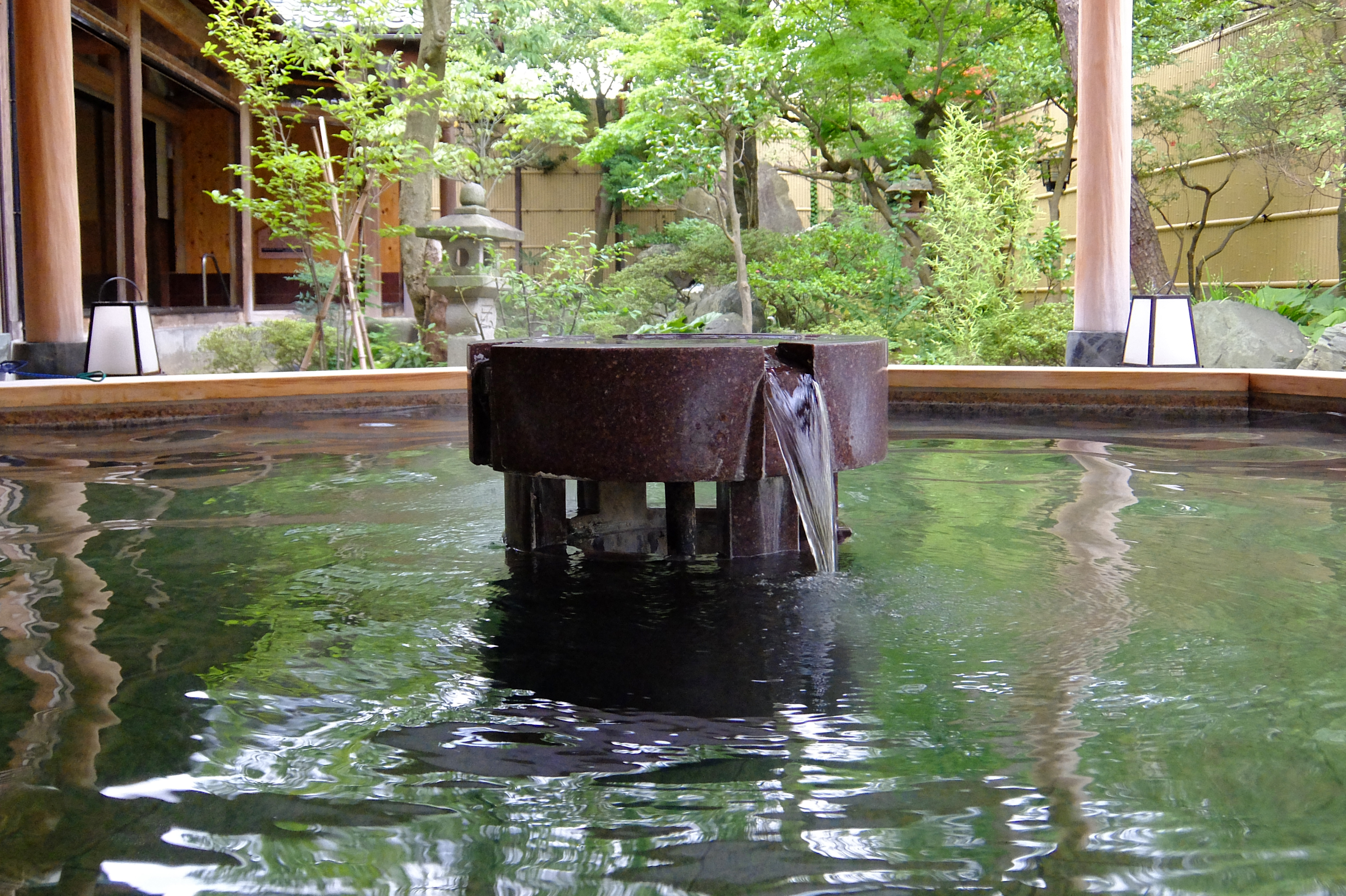
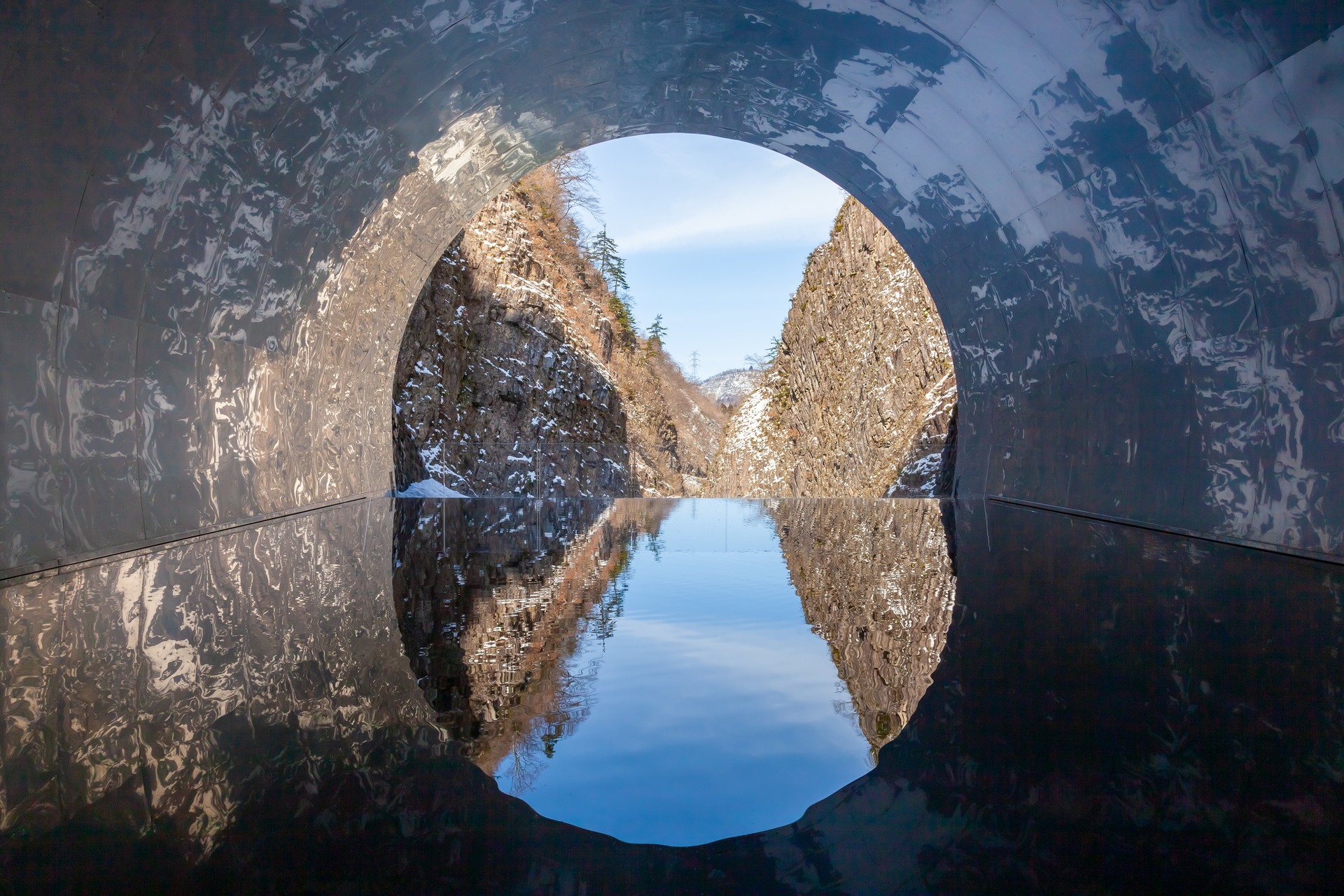
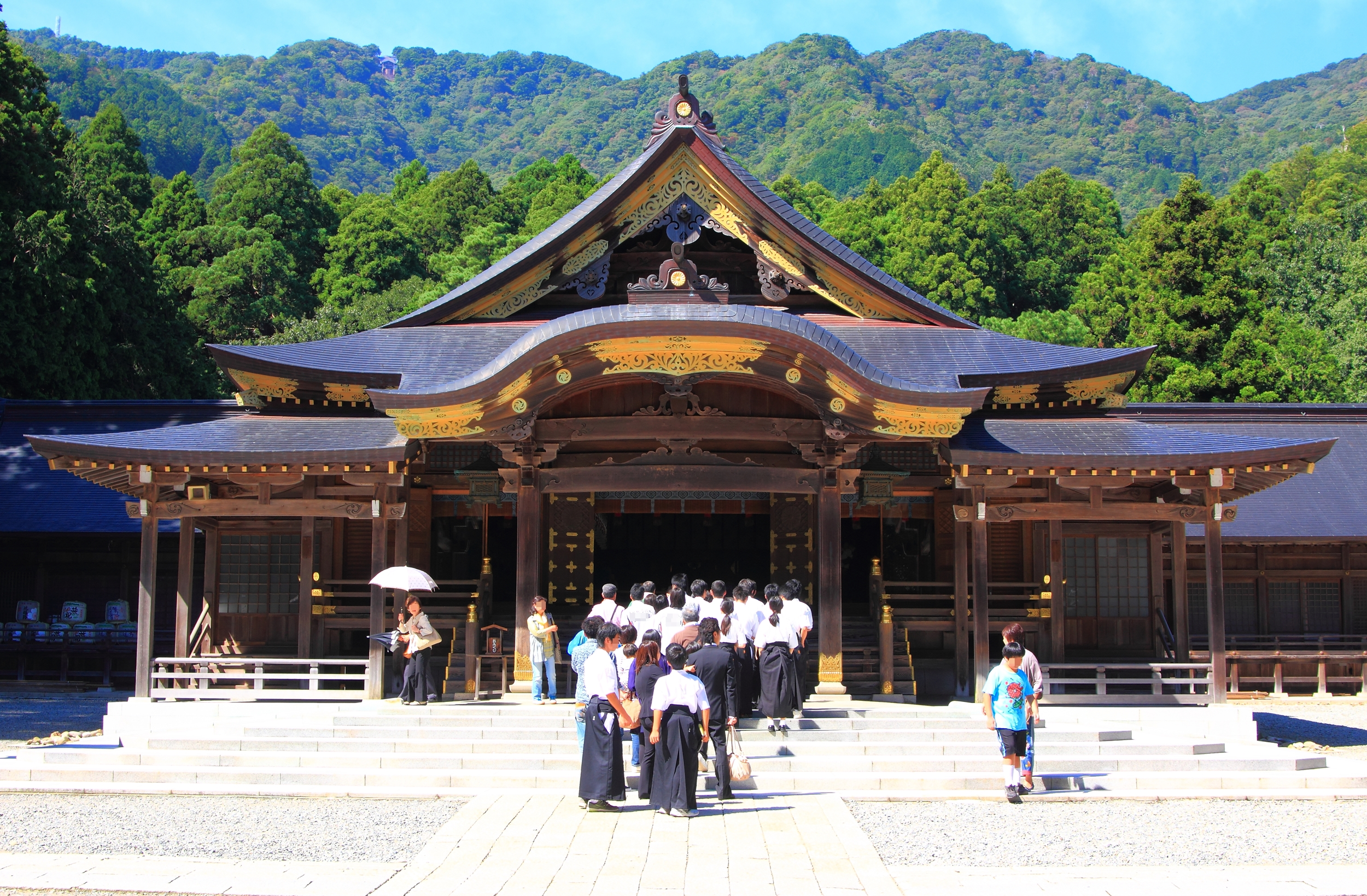
- Echigo Plain Ski resort in Myōkō Futatsugame in Sado Island Tsukioka Onsen Kiyotsu Gorge Yahiko Shrine

- Flag Emblem
- Anthem: Niigata kenminka
- Country: Japan
- Region: Chūbu (Kōshinetsu) (Hokuriku)
- Island: Honshu
- Capital: Niigata
- Subdivisions: Districts: 9, Municipalities: 30

Government
  - Governor: Hideyo Hanazumi

Area
  - Total: 12,584.18 km^{2} (4,858.78 sq mi)
  - Rank: 5th

Population (October 1, 2025)
  - Total: 2,071,066
  - Rank: 15th
  - Density: 164.5770/km^{2} (426.2524/sq mi)

GDP
  - Total: JP¥ 9,043 billion US$ 66.8 billion (2022)
- ISO 3166 code: JP-15
- Website: www.pref.niigata.lg.jp
- Symbols of Japan
- Bird: Crested ibis (Nipponia nippon)
- Flower: Tulip (Tulipa gesneriana)
- Tree: Camellia (Camellia japonica)

Niigata Prefecture (新潟県, Niigata-ken; Japanese pronunciation: [ɲ̟ìí.ɡä́.tä́(.kè̞ɴ̀), -ŋä́-, ɲ̟íí-]) is a prefecture in the Chūbu region of Honshu of Japan. Niigata Prefecture has a population of 2,071,066 (as of 1 October 2025) and is the fifth-largest prefecture of Japan by geographic area at 12,584.18 km^{2} (4,858.78 sq mi). Niigata Prefecture borders Toyama Prefecture and Nagano Prefecture to the southwest, Gunma Prefecture to the south, Fukushima Prefecture to the east, and Yamagata Prefecture to the northeast.

Niigata is the capital and largest city of Niigata Prefecture, with other major cities including Nagaoka, Jōetsu, and Sanjō. Niigata Prefecture contains the Niigata Major Metropolitan Area centered on Niigata with a population of 1,395,612, the largest metropolitan area on the Sea of Japan coast and the twelfth-largest in Japan. Niigata Prefecture is part of the historic Hokuriku region and features Sado Island, the sixth largest island of Japan in area following the four main islands and Okinawa Island.

== History ==
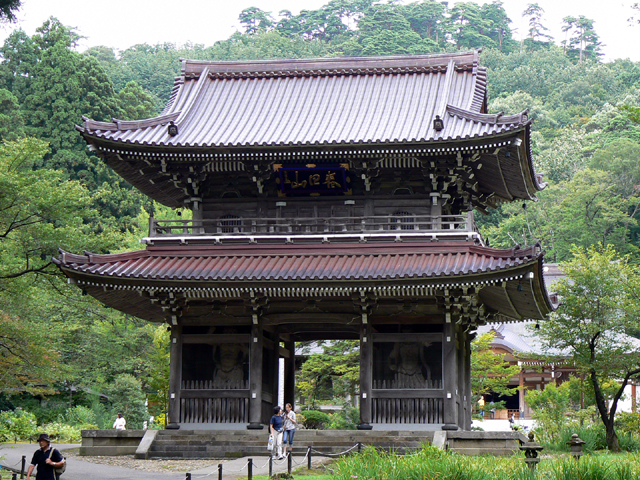
Rinsenji Temple, the family temple of Uesugi

Until after the Meiji Restoration, the area that is now Niigata Prefecture was divided into Echigo Province (on the mainland) and Sado Province. During the Sengoku period, the Nagao clan, who were at times vassals to the Uesugi, ruled a fief in the western part of modern Niigata from Kasugayama Castle. The most notable member of the Nagao clan was Nagao Kagetora, later and better known as Uesugi Kenshin. He unified the leaders of Echigo Province and became its sole ruler. By taking the surname Uesugi, he also became the head of the Uesugi clan and effectively brought their realm under his control.

The city of Niigata is now the third largest Japanese city facing the Sea of Japan, after Fukuoka and Kitakyushu. It was the first Japanese port on the Sea of Japan to be opened to foreign trade following the opening of Japan by Matthew Perry. It has since played an important role in trade with Russia and Korea. A freighter from North Korea visits Niigata once a month, in one of the few forms of direct contact between Japan and that country.

The Etsuzankai organization, led by the politician Kakuei Tanaka, was highly influential in bringing infrastructure improvements to Niigata Prefecture in the 1960s and 1970s. These included the Jōetsu Shinkansen high-speed rail line and the Kanetsu Expressway to Tokyo.

On October 23, 2004, the Chūetsu earthquake struck Niigata Prefecture and was measured at Shindo 6+ at Ojiya.

On January 9, 2006, a heavy winter storm struck the prefecture and its neighbors. At least 71 people died and more than 1,000 were injured. Also in 2006, a massive tsunami and earthquake damaged homes and caused casualties in the maritime areas of Niigata Prefecture, especially near Sado Island.

On July 16, 2007, another earthquake hit the area.

Niigata Prefecture hosts the Fuji Rock Festival, an annual event held at the Naeba ski resort. The three-day event, organized by Smash Japan, features more than 200 Japanese and international musicians. It is one of the largest outdoor music events in Japan, with more than 100,000 people attending in 2005.

== Geography ==
Map of Niigata Prefecture Government Ordinance Designated City City Town Village

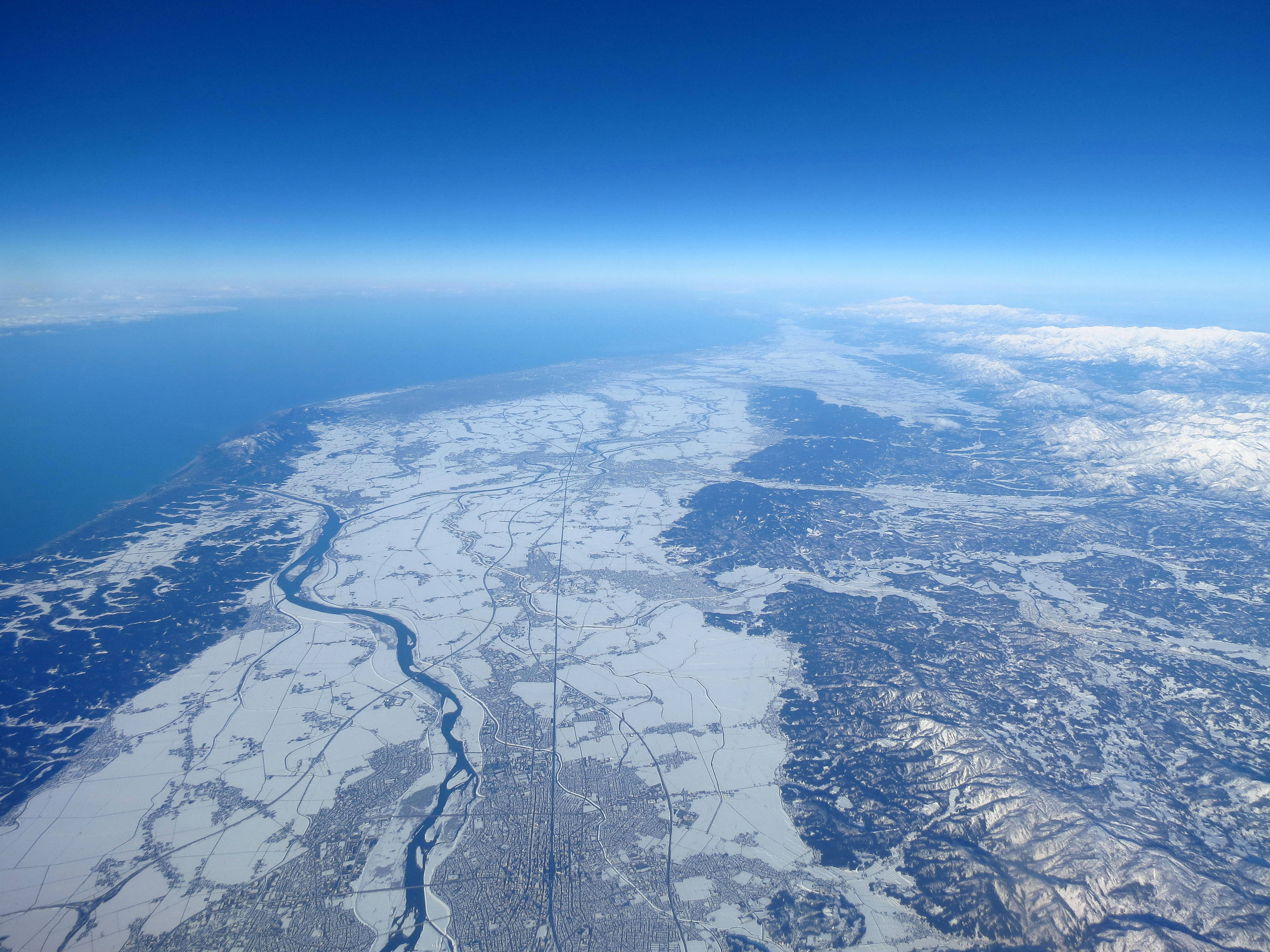
Niigata Prefecture in winter from the sky

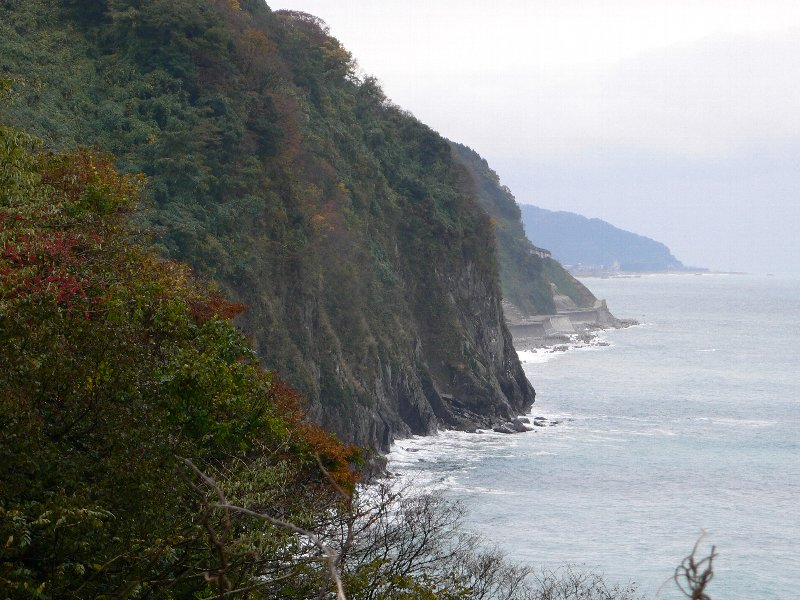
Ten-Ken cliff of Oya-Shirazu, Itoigawa

Niigata Prefecture stretches about 240 km (149 mi) along the Sea of Japan, from the southwest to the northeast, with a coastal plain between the mountains and the sea. It also includes Sado Island. Niigata Prefecture could be placed in either the Hokuriku or the Kōshinetsu, both of which are considered parts of the Chūbu region. The prefecture is generally divided into four geographical areas: Jōetsu region (上越) in the south, Chūetsu (中越) in the center, Kaetsu (下越) in the north, and Sado Island. The mouth of the Shinano River, the longest river in Japan, is located in Niigata Prefecture.

As of 1 April 2014, 25% of the total land area of the prefecture was designated as Natural Parks, namely Bandai-Asahi, Chūbu-Sangaku, Nikkō, and Oze National Parks; Echigo Sanzan-Tadami and Sado-Yahiko-Yoneyama Quasi-National Parks; and thirteen Prefectural Natural Parks.

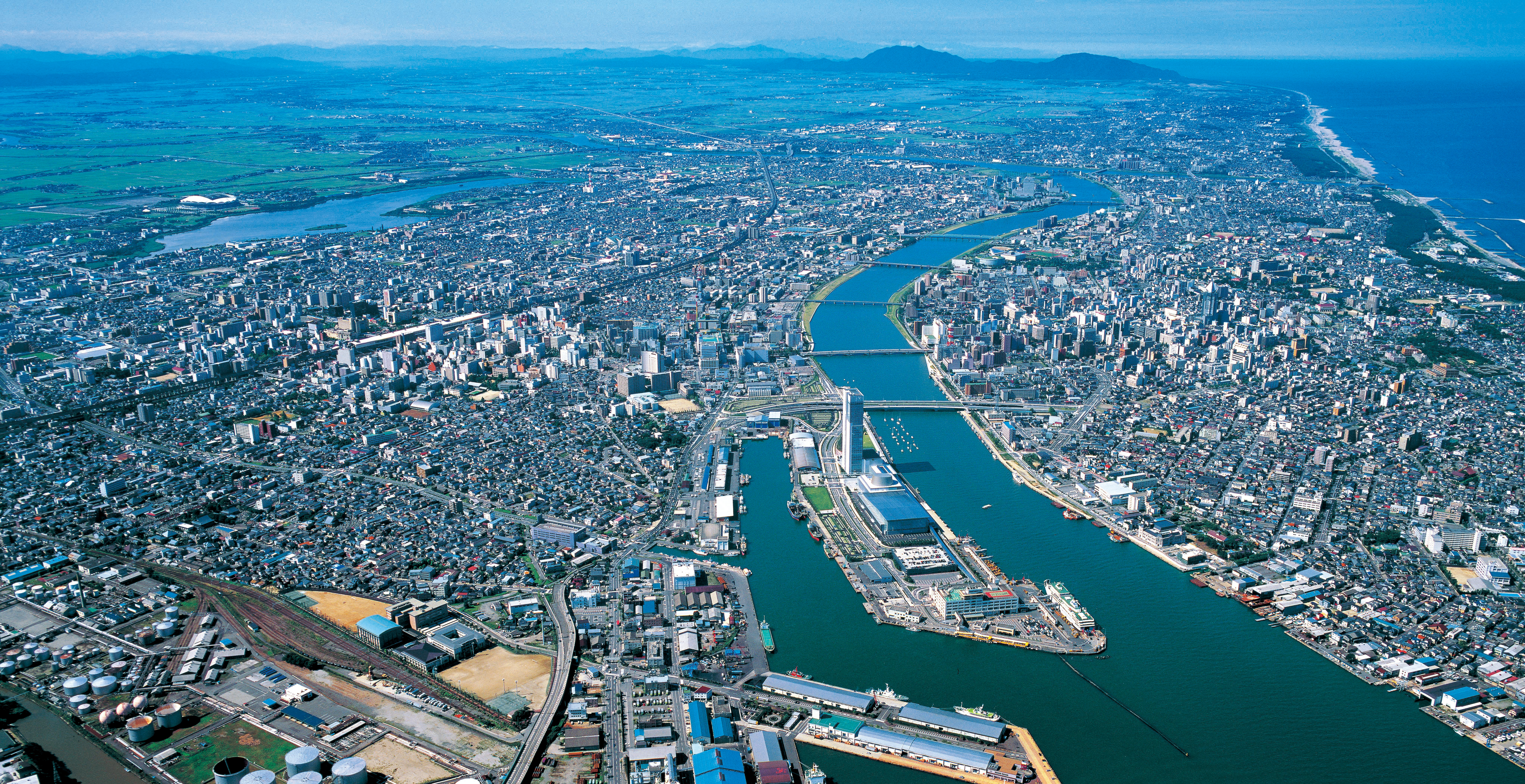
Port of Niigata in Niigata City

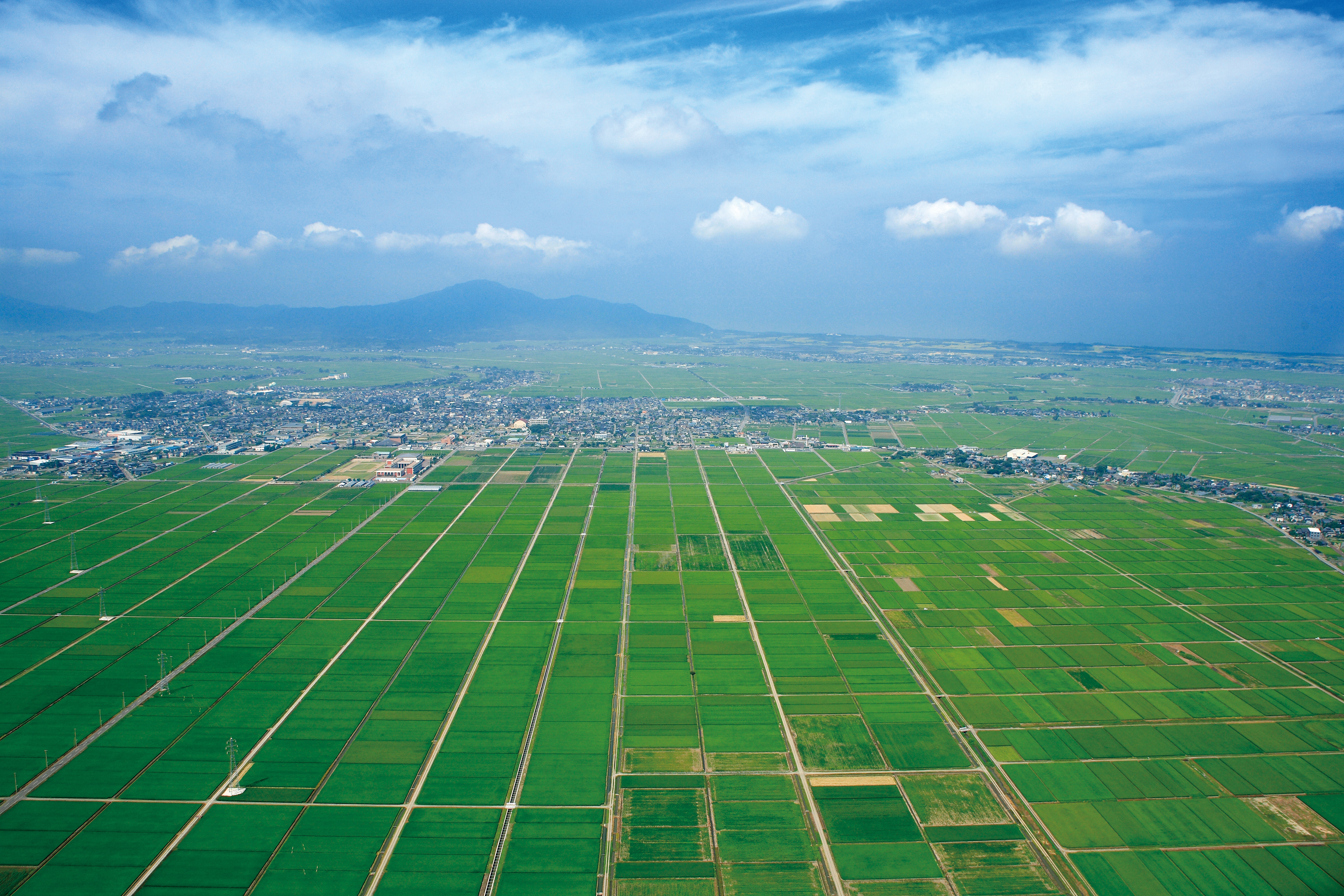
Echigo Plain

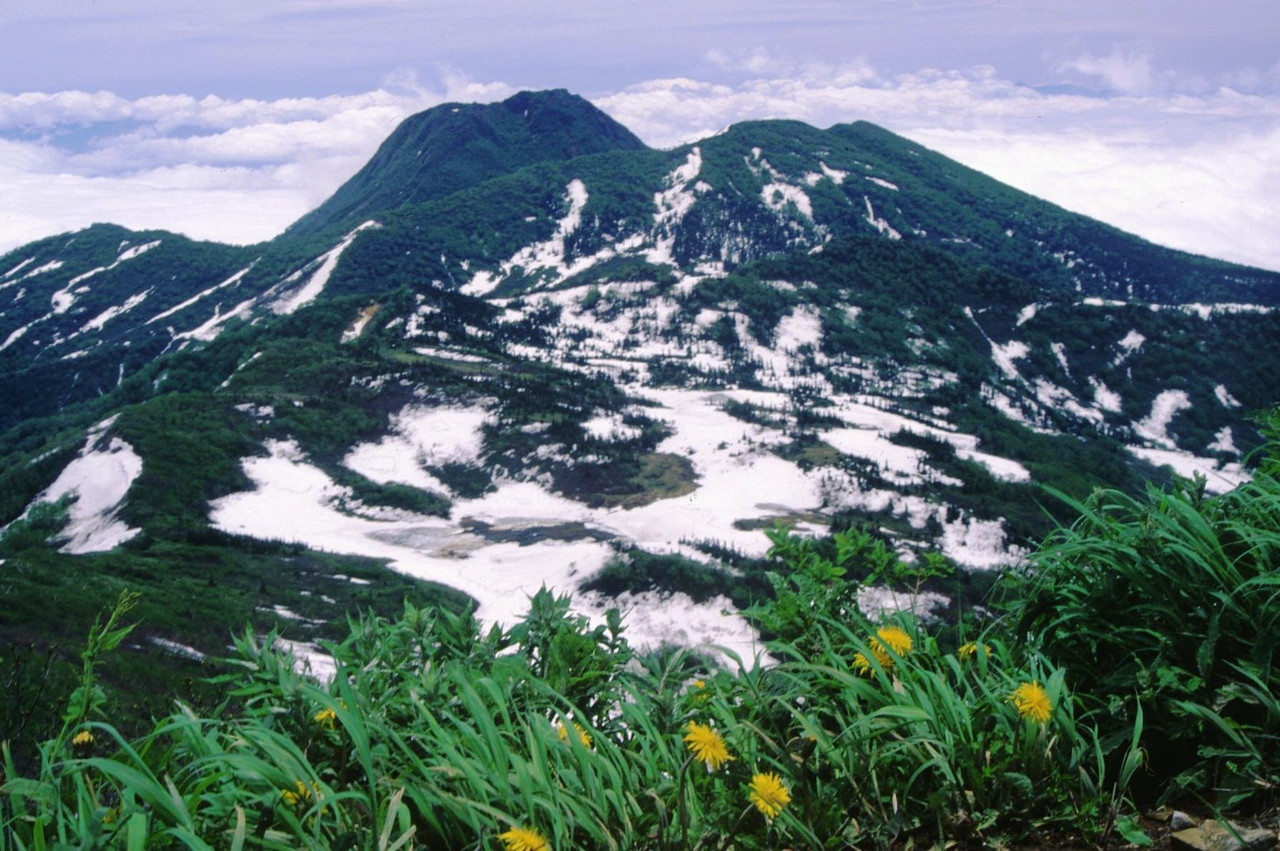
Mount Myōkō

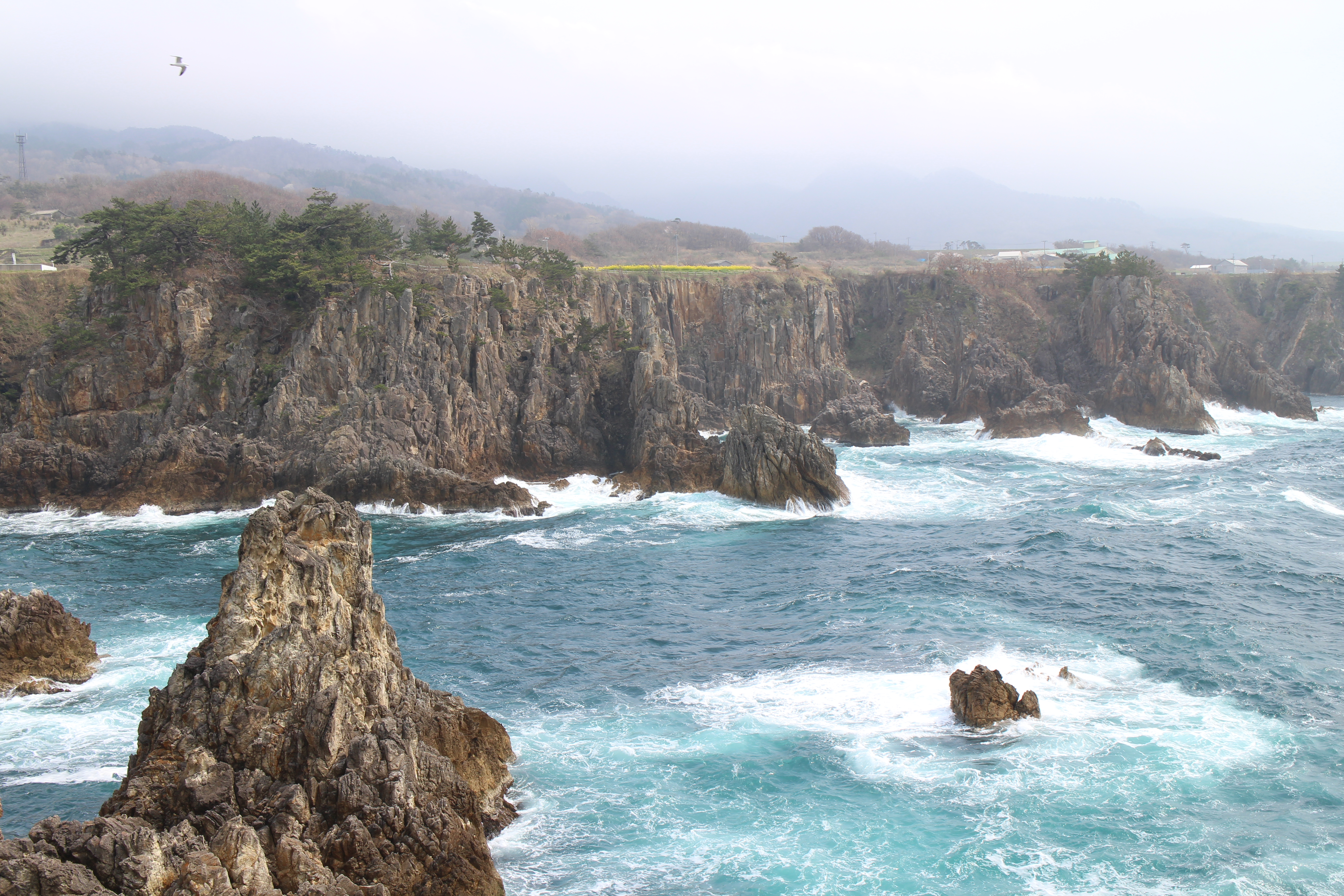
Senkakuwan in Sado Island

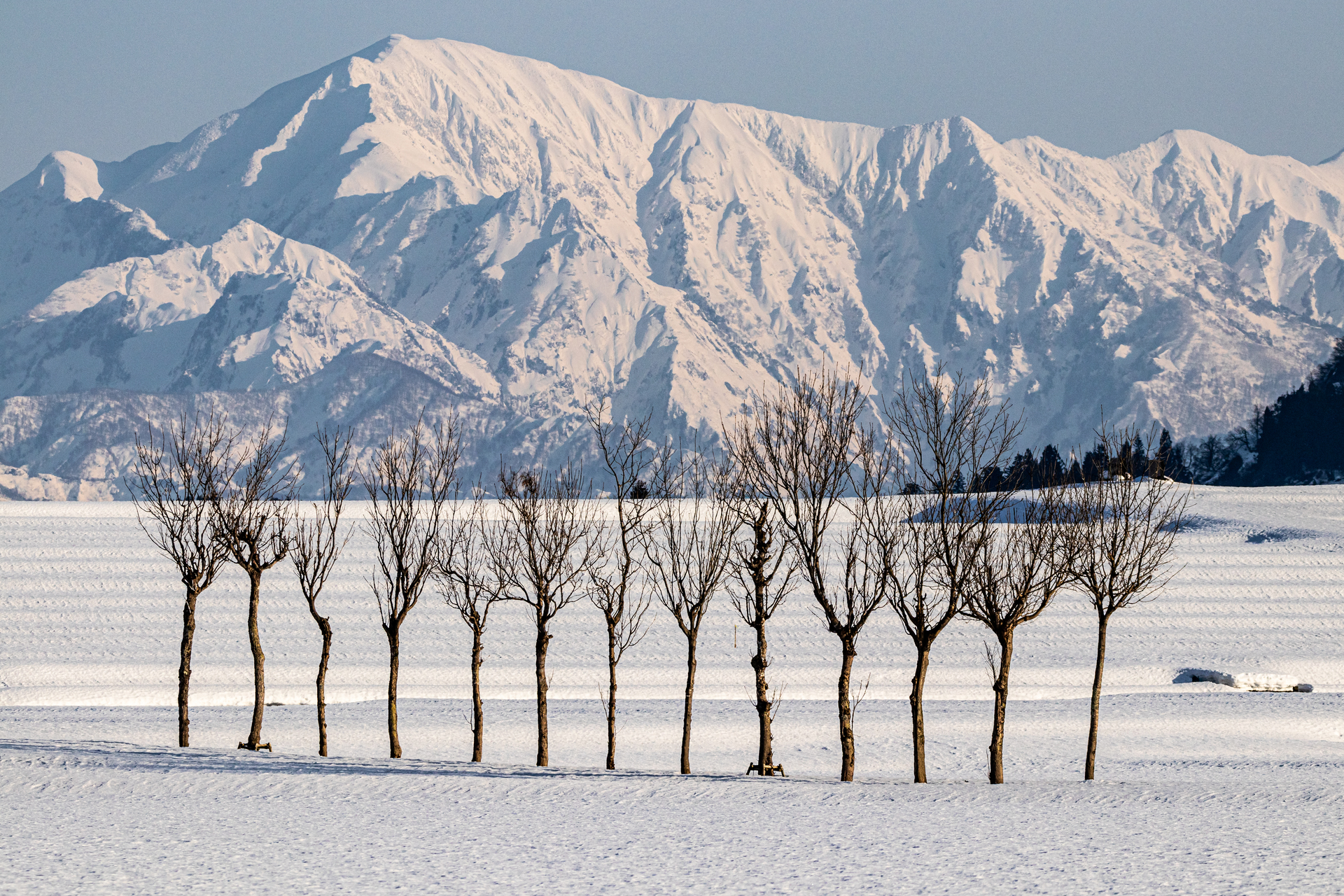
Paddy fields and mountains in Ojiya in winter

=== Cities ===
Twenty cities are located in Niigata Prefecture:

Name		Area (km^{2})	Population	Map
Rōmaji	Kanji	Area (km^{2})	Population	Map
Agano	阿賀野市	192.74	41,204	
Gosen	五泉市	351.91	48,458	
Itoigawa	糸魚川市	746.24	41,333	
Jōetsu	上越市	973.81	189,430	
Kamo	加茂市	133.72	25,971	
Kashiwazaki	柏崎市	442.03	81,836	
Minamiuonuma	南魚沼市	584.55	55,354	
Mitsuke	見附市	77.91	39,908	
Murakami	村上市	1,174.26	58,300	
Myōkō	妙高市	445.63	31,374	
Nagaoka	長岡市	891.06	266,539	
Niigata (capital)	新潟市	726.45	797,591	
Ojiya	小千谷市	155.19	34,704	
Sado	佐渡市	855.26	55,474	
Sanjō	三条市	431.97	95,706	
Shibata	新発田市	533.1	96,236	
Tainai	胎内市	264.89	28,495	
Tōkamachi	十日町市	590.39	53,333	
Tsubame	燕市	110.96	77,382	
Uonuma	魚沼市	946.76	35,027	

=== Towns and villages ===
These are the towns and villages in each district:

Name		Area (km^{2})	Population	District	Type	Map
Rōmaji	Kanji	Area (km^{2})	Population	District	Type	Map
Aga	阿賀町	952.89	10,386	Higashikanbara District	Town	
Awashimaura	粟島浦村	9.78	353	Iwafune District	Village	
Izumozaki	出雲崎町	44.38	4,190	Santō District	Town	
Kariwa	刈羽村	26.27	4,578	Kariwa District	Village	
Seirō	聖籠町	37.58	14,025	Kitakanbara District	Town	
Sekikawa	関川村	299.61	5,291	Iwafune District	Village	
Tagami	田上町	31.71	11,481	Minamikanbara District	Town	
Tsunan	津南町	170.21	9,349	Nakauonuma District	Town	
Yahiko	弥彦村	25.17	7,824	Nishikanbara District	Village	
Yuzawa	湯沢町	357.29	7,926	Minami-Uonuma District	Town	

== List of governors of Niigata Prefecture (from 1947) ==
- Shohei Okada (岡田正平) – from 15 April 1947 to 29 April 1955
- Kazuo Kitamura (北村一男) – from 30 April 1955 to 30 November 1961
- Toichiro Tsukada (塚田十一郎) – from 7 December 1961 to 28 March 1966
- Shiro Watari (亘四郎) – from 8 May 1966 to 30 April 1974
- Takeo Kimi (君健男) – from 1 May 1974 to 19 April 1989
- Kiyoshi Kaneko (金子清) – from 4 June 1989 to 9 September 1992
- Ikuo Hirayama (平山征夫) – from 25 October 1992 to 24 October 2004
- Hirohiko Izumida (泉田裕彦) – from 25 October 2004 to 24 October 2016
- Ryuichi Yoneyama (米山隆一) – from 25 October 2016 to 27 April 2018
- Hideyo Hanazumi (花角英世) – from 12 June 2018 to present

== Economy ==
=== Agriculture, forestry and fishing ===
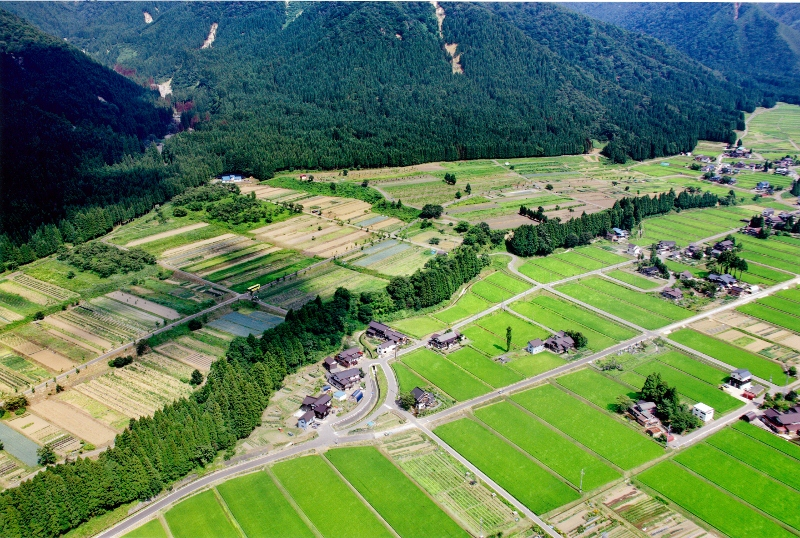
Paddy fields in Minamiuonuma

The major industry in Niigata Prefecture is agriculture. Rice is the principal product, and among the prefectures of Japan Niigata ranks first in rice output, followed by Hokkaido and Akita. The area around Uonuma is known for producing the Koshihikari variety, widely considered to be the highest-quality rice produced in Japan.

Rice-related industries are also very important to the prefectural economy. Niigata Prefecture is known throughout Japan for its high-quality sake, senbei, mochi, and arare. In sake production, the prefecture comes third after Gunma and Kyoto prefectures.

The prefecture was also the place of origin of the ornamental carp known as koi.

Niigata Prefecture produces the highest volume of azaleas and cut lilies in Japan, and is increasing the production of cut flowers and flower bulbs. Along with Toyama Prefecture, it produces the highest volume of tulips in the country.

=== Mining and manufacturing ===
Ruins of Kitazawa Flotation Plant, Sado gold mine

Crude oil is produced in Niigata Prefecture, although Japan relies heavily on petroleum imported from other countries. Kerosene heaters are also produced for use in the cold Niigata winters.

Kinzan, on Sado Island, was an active gold mine until it was closed in 1989.

Sanjō and Tsubame produce 90 percent of all the silverware made in Japan. The two cities are second after Osaka in the production of scissors, kitchen knives, nail clippers and wrenches.

Niigata Prefecture may have been the first area in Japan to produce knitted textiles, although the earliest products may have been imported from China. A nuclear power plant, which formerly had the highest energy output in the world, is located in the tiny village of Kariwa. It has been closed since the Fukushima Daiichi nuclear disaster.

== Demographics ==
Niigata prefecture population pyramid in 2020

Historical population
Year	Pop.	±% p.a.
1880	1,546,338	—
1890	1,693,727	+0.91%
1903	1,780,123	+0.38%
1913	1,911,308	+0.71%
1920	1,776,474	−1.04%
1925	1,849,807	+0.81%
1930	1,933,326	+0.89%
1935	1,995,777	+0.64%
1940	2,064,402	+0.68%
1945	2,389,653	+2.97%
1950	2,460,997	+0.59%
1955	2,473,492	+0.10%
1960	2,442,037	−0.26%
1965	2,398,931	−0.36%
1970	2,360,982	−0.32%
1975	2,391,938	+0.26%
1980	2,451,357	+0.49%
1985	2,478,470	+0.22%
1990	2,474,583	−0.03%
1995	2,488,364	+0.11%
2000	2,475,733	−0.10%
2005	2,431,459	−0.36%
2010	2,374,450	−0.47%
2015	2,305,098	−0.59%
2020	2,227,496	−0.68%

In the Census of 2020, Niigata ranked as the 15th most populous prefecture. Its population decreased by 103,000 between 2015 and 2020 and this was the second largest decline after Hokkaido (157,000).

== Culture ==
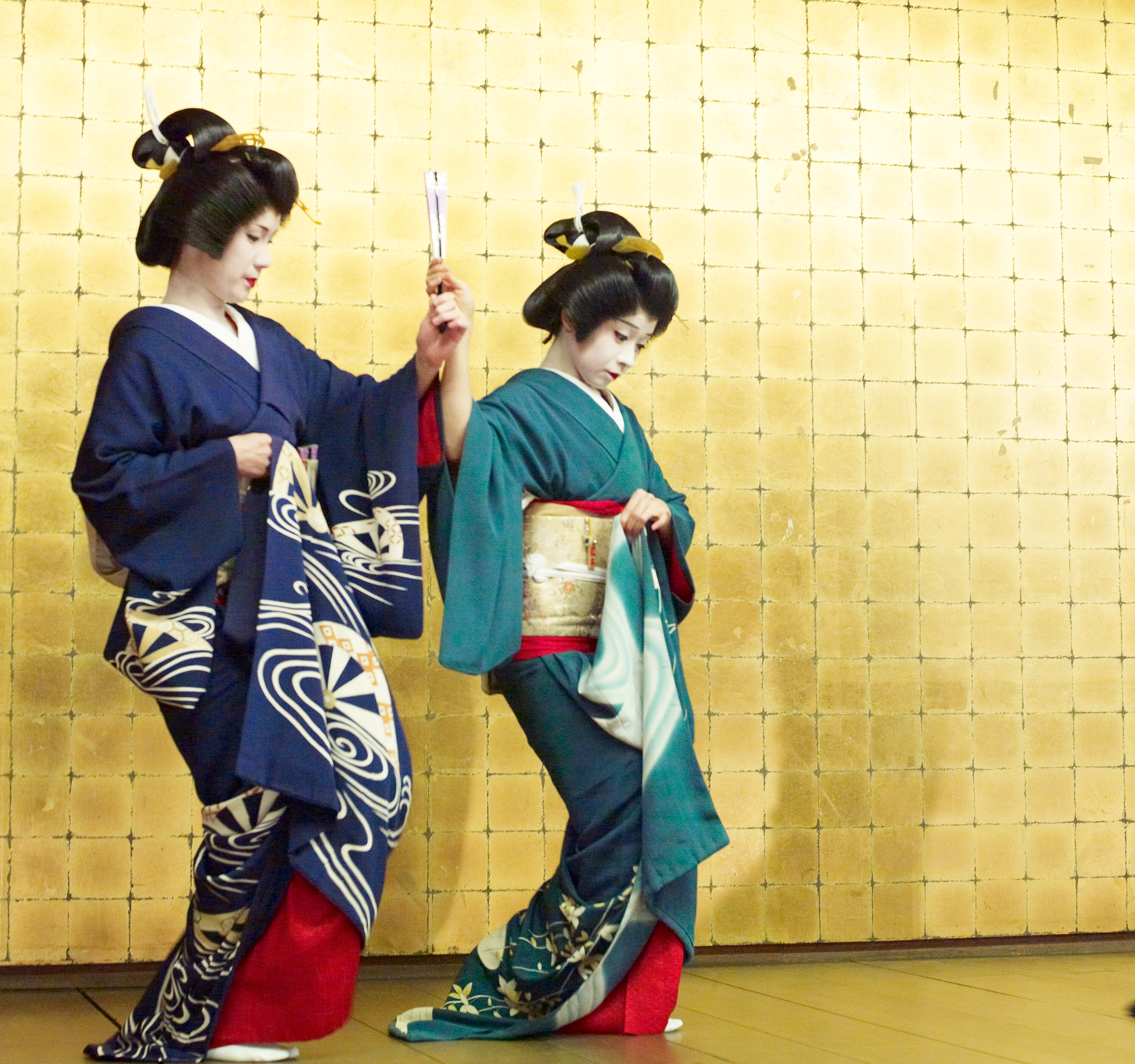
Niigata Geishas

=== Food ===
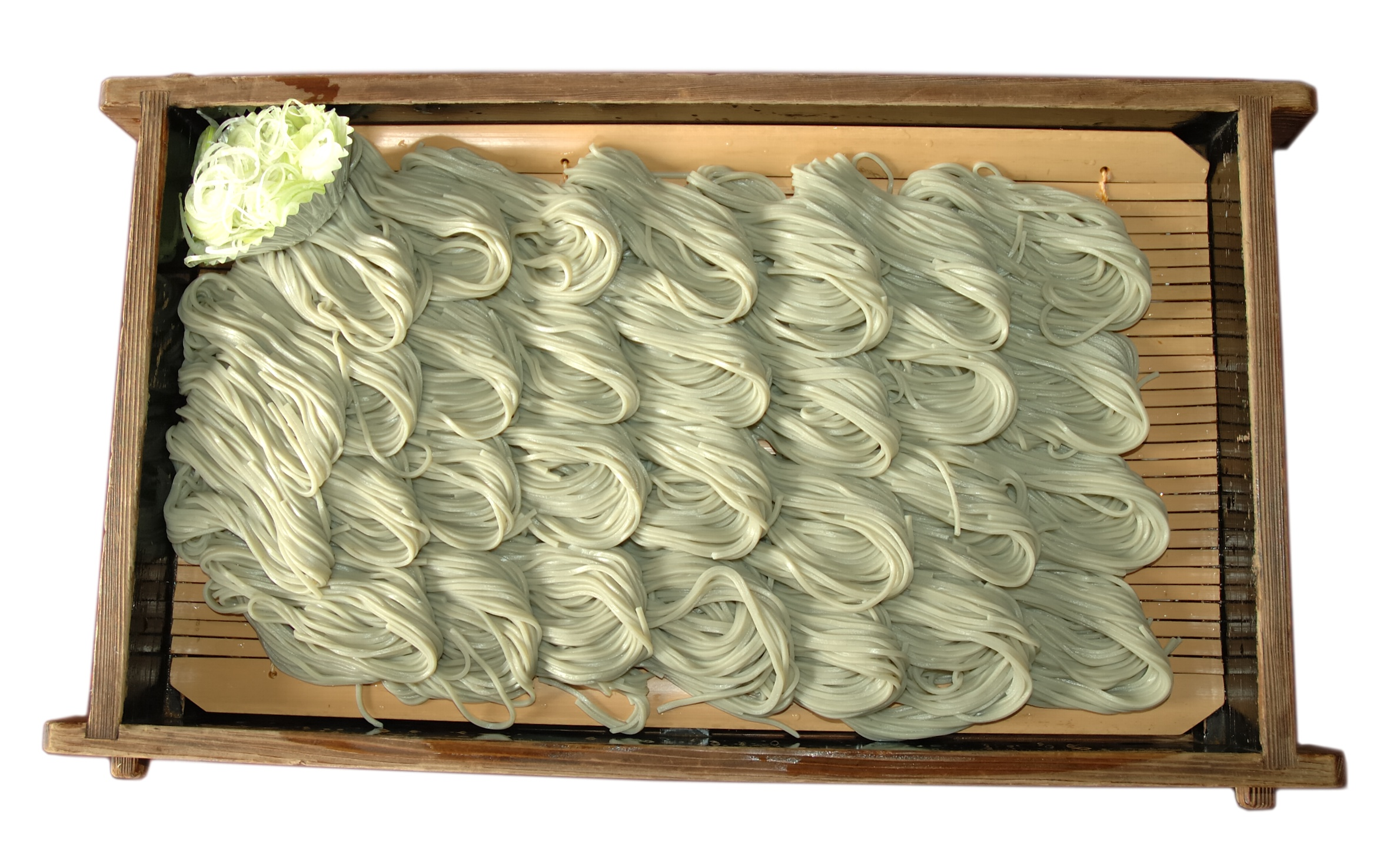
Hegisoba

Niigata is known for the following regional specialities:

- Uonuma Koshihikari rice
- Shōyu (soy sauce) and Yofu (western-style) katsudon
- Shōyu sekihan
- Noppe stew
- Wappa-meshi (seafood and rice steamed in a bamboo basket)
- Sasa-dango (mochi balls filled with red bean paste, seasoned with mugwort and wrapped in bamboo leaves)
- Poppo-yaki (steamed bread flavored with brown sugar)
- Hegi-soba (soba from the Uonuma and Ojiya areas, flavored with a special kind of seaweed)
- "Tsubame-Sanjō ramen" (ramen made using thick udon-style noodles)
- Tochio aburage (aburaage is called "aburage" in Tochio)
- Kirazu (dishes using okara)
- Kakinomoto (edible chrysanthemums)
- Kanzuri (a fermented paste from Myōkō made by leaving chili peppers exposed on snow, then adding salt, yuzu, and kōji mold)
- Yasuda yogurt

=== Niigata in popular culture ===
- Snow Country (1947): a novel by Nobel laureate Yasunari Kawabata set in Yuzawa
- "Niigata Snow": a track on the LP Aida, released by Derek Bailey in 1980
- Kura: a film and TV series (1995) based on the 1993 book by Tomiko Miyao, an award-winning period piece about a Niigata family and its sake brewery
- Blue (1996): a manga about high school girls, set in Niigata City, adapted as a film in 2001
- Whiteout: an action film based on a novel published in 1995
- United States of Tara (2011): a comedy-drama series on Showtime; Kate is about to embark on a trip to teach English in Niigata when a flight attendant tells her that the only thing she will hopefully find in Niigata is "a life lesson and a bullet train back to Tokyo."

== Tourism and sports ==
Much of the tourism in Niigata centers around skiing, especially in the alpine areas of Myōkō and Yuzawa, and going to onsen. Sado Island off the west coast of Niigata is accessible via ferry (taking one to two and a half hours) from Naoetsu or Niigata City.

Professional sports clubs include Albirex Niigata, a J-League Division 1 Football Club, and Niigata Albirex BB, a BJ (Basketball Japan) League team.

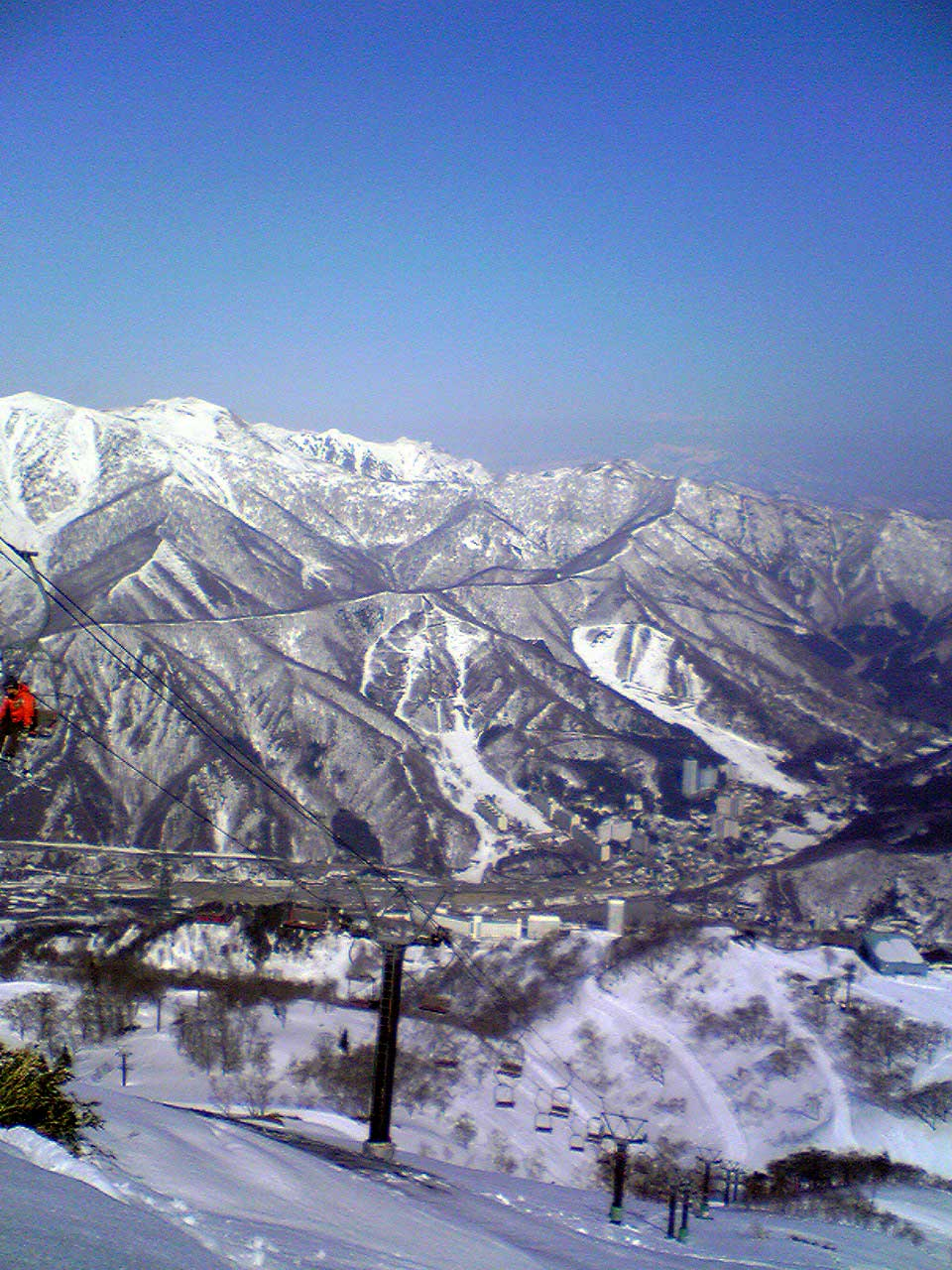
Naeba ski resort in Yuzawa

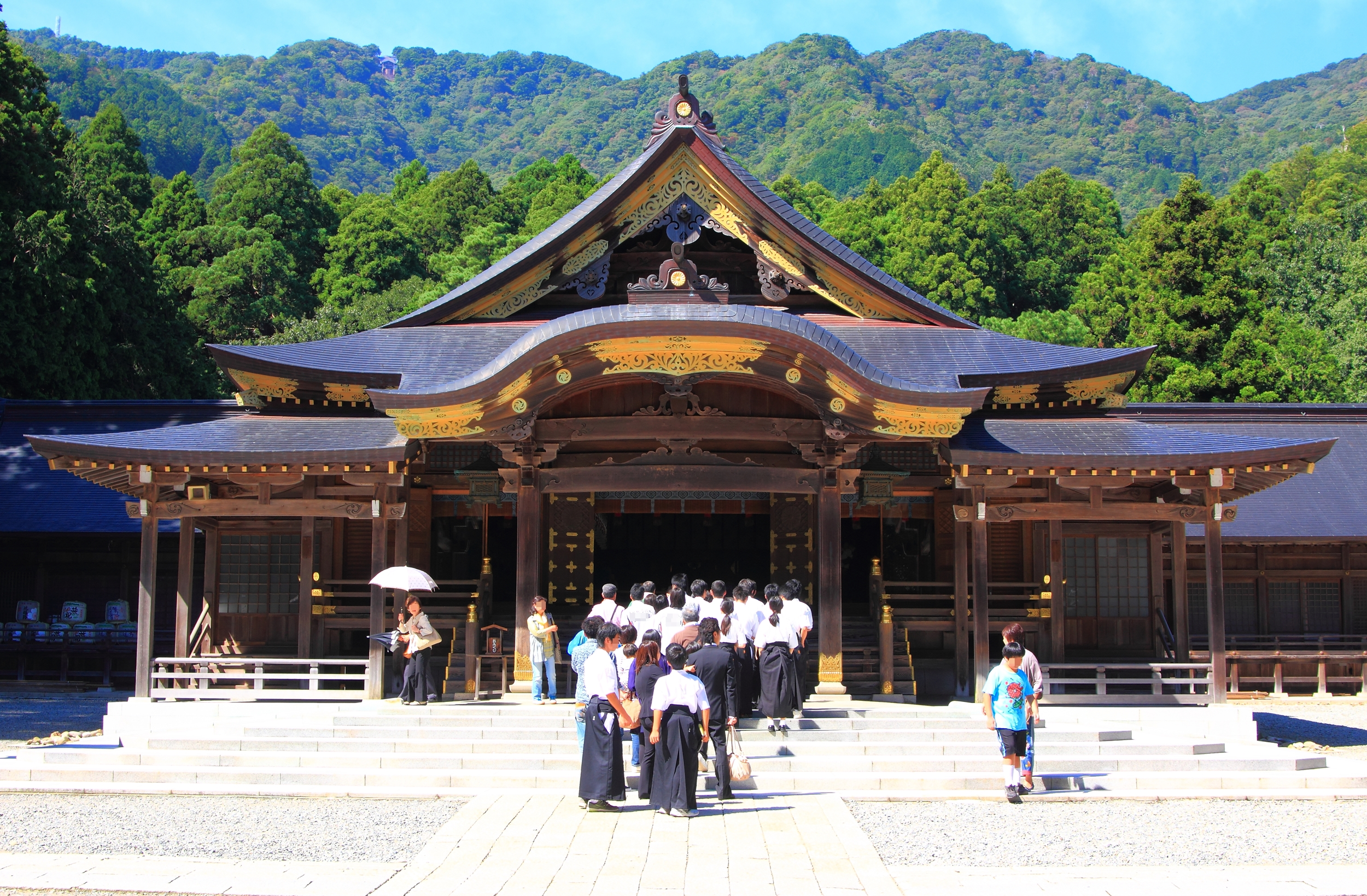
Yahiko Shrine

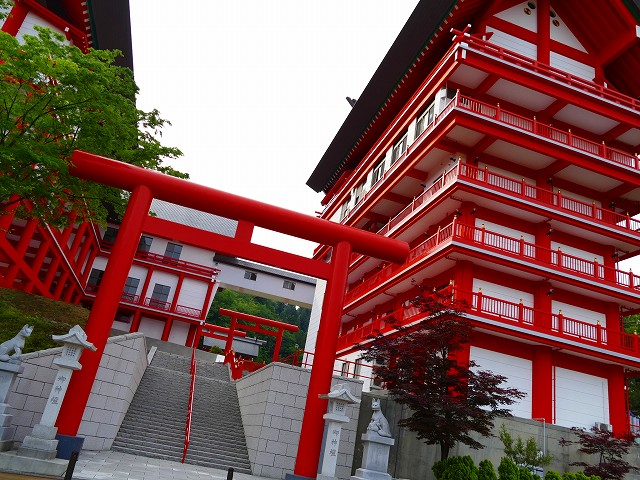
Hotokusan-inaritaisha shrine

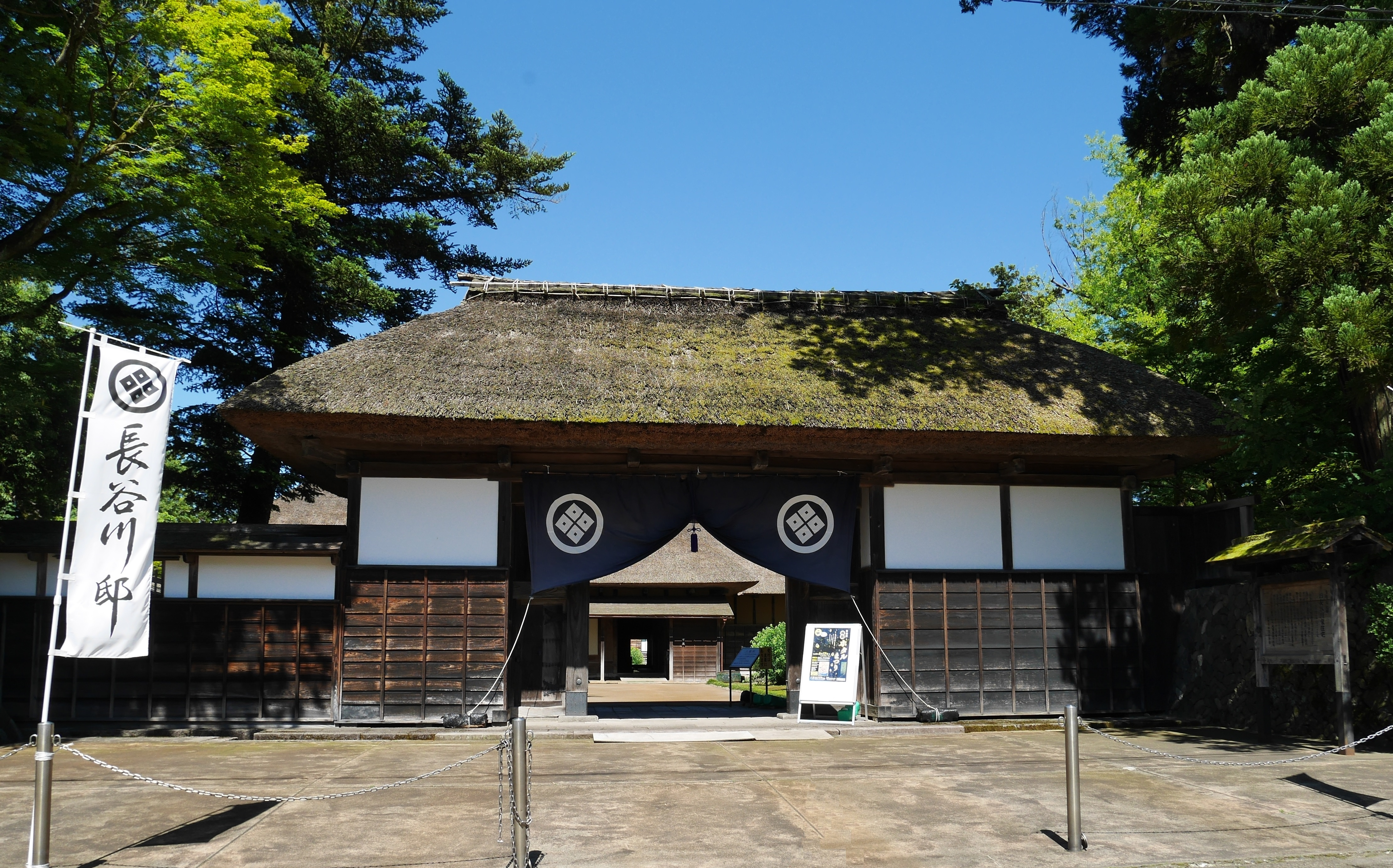
Hasegawa Family Residence

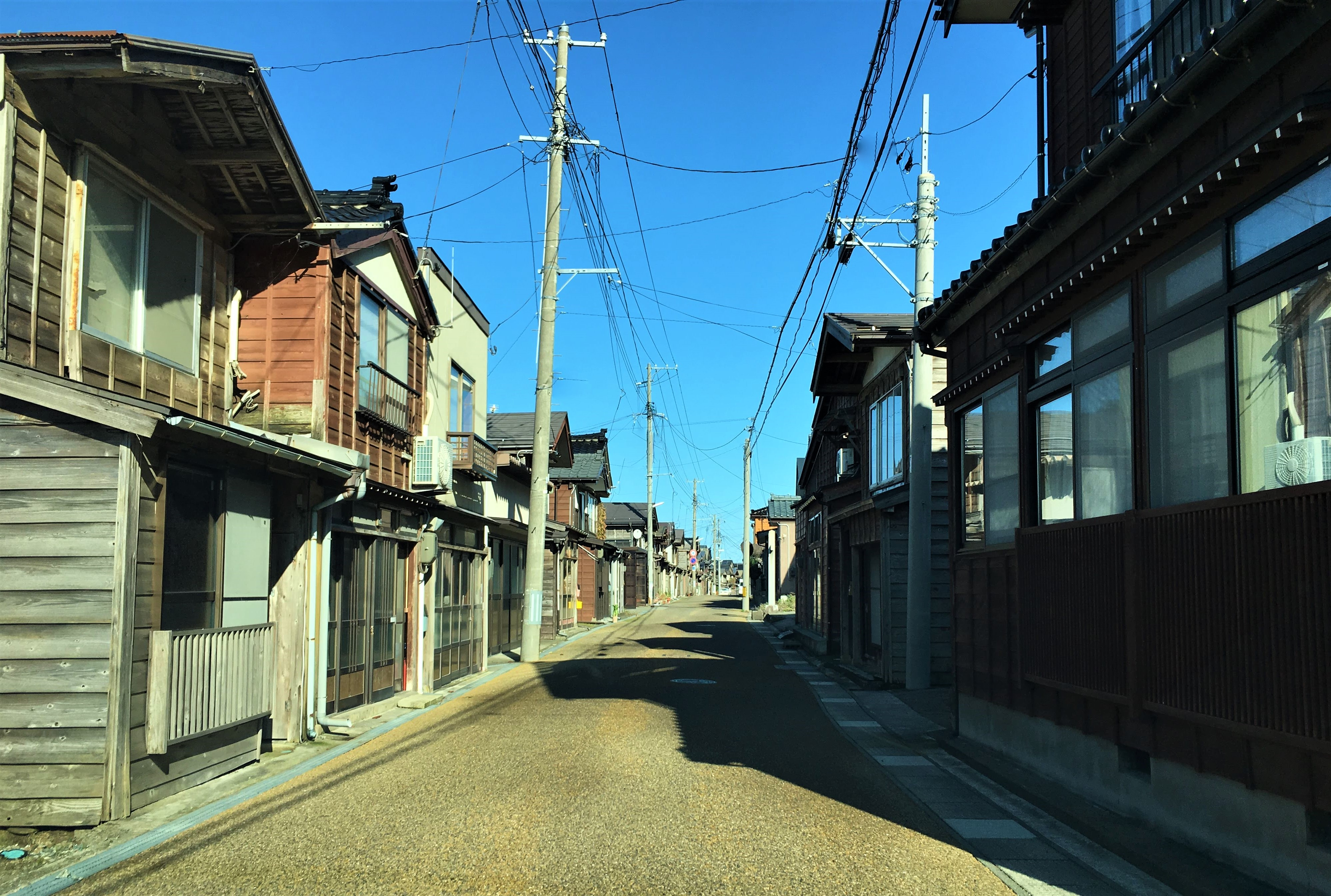
Izumozaki-juku (Japanese historical highway Hokkokukaido)

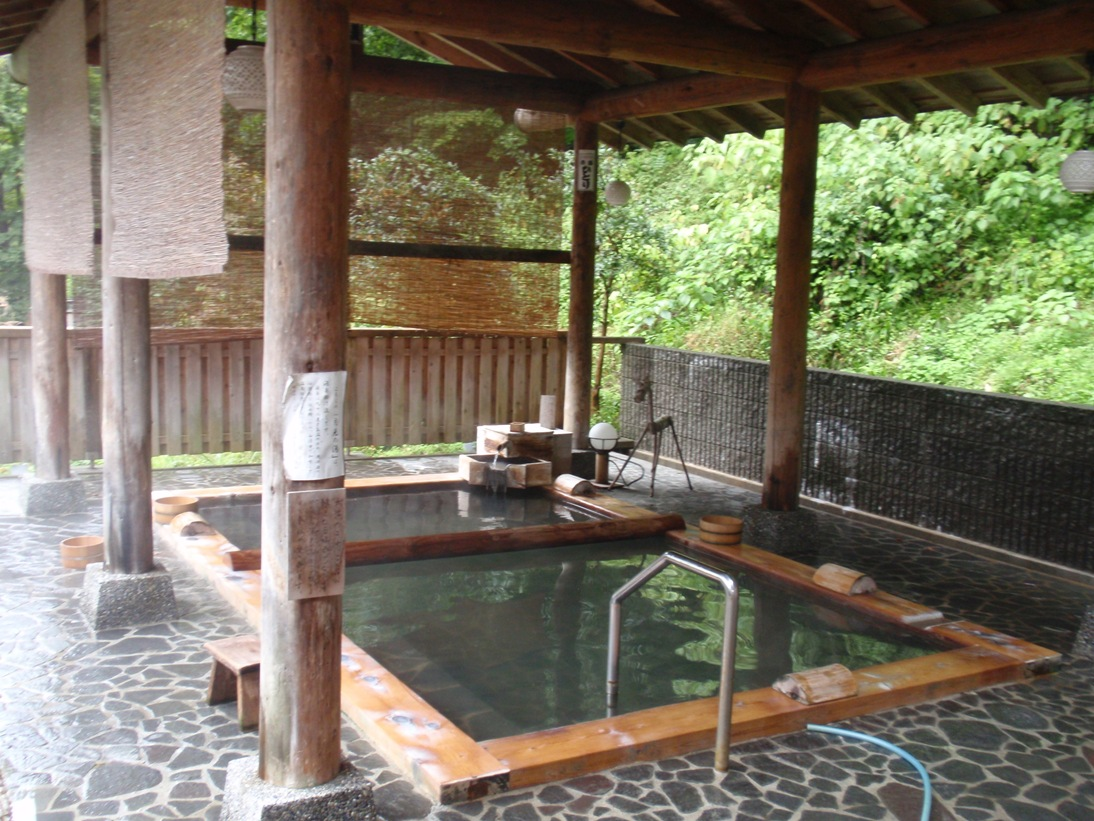
Matsunoyama Onsen

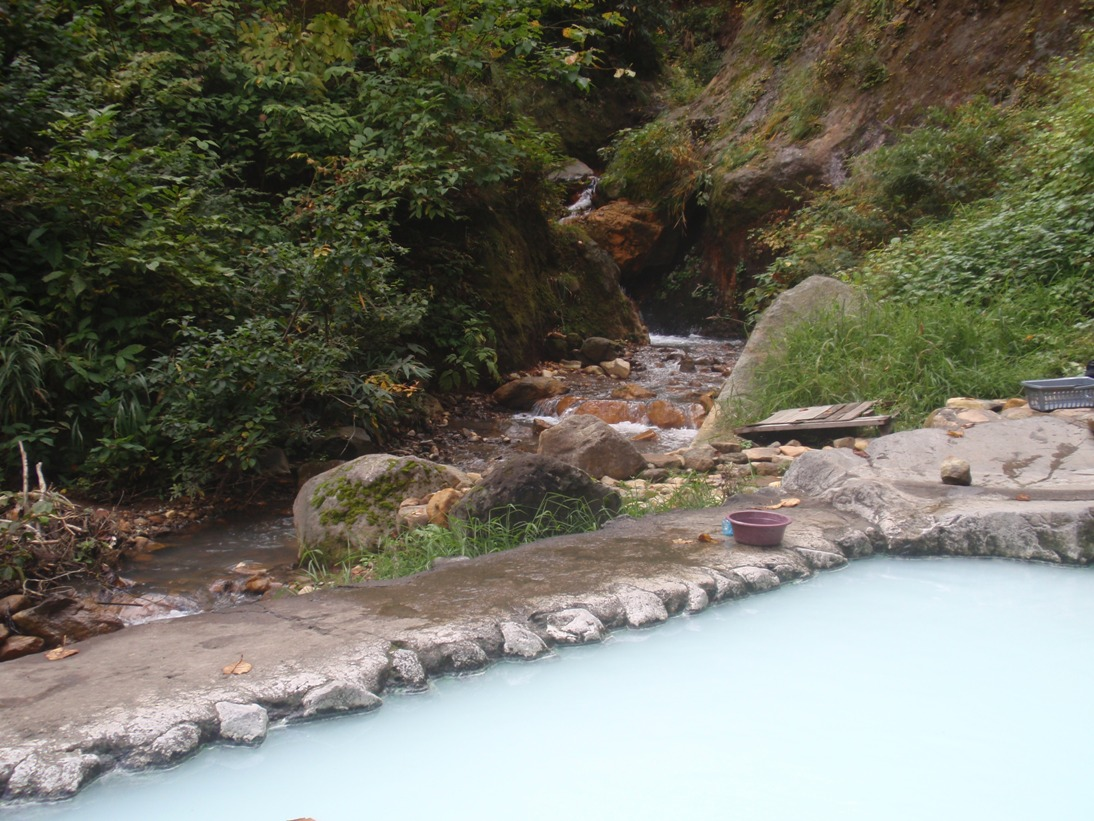
Tsubame Onsen

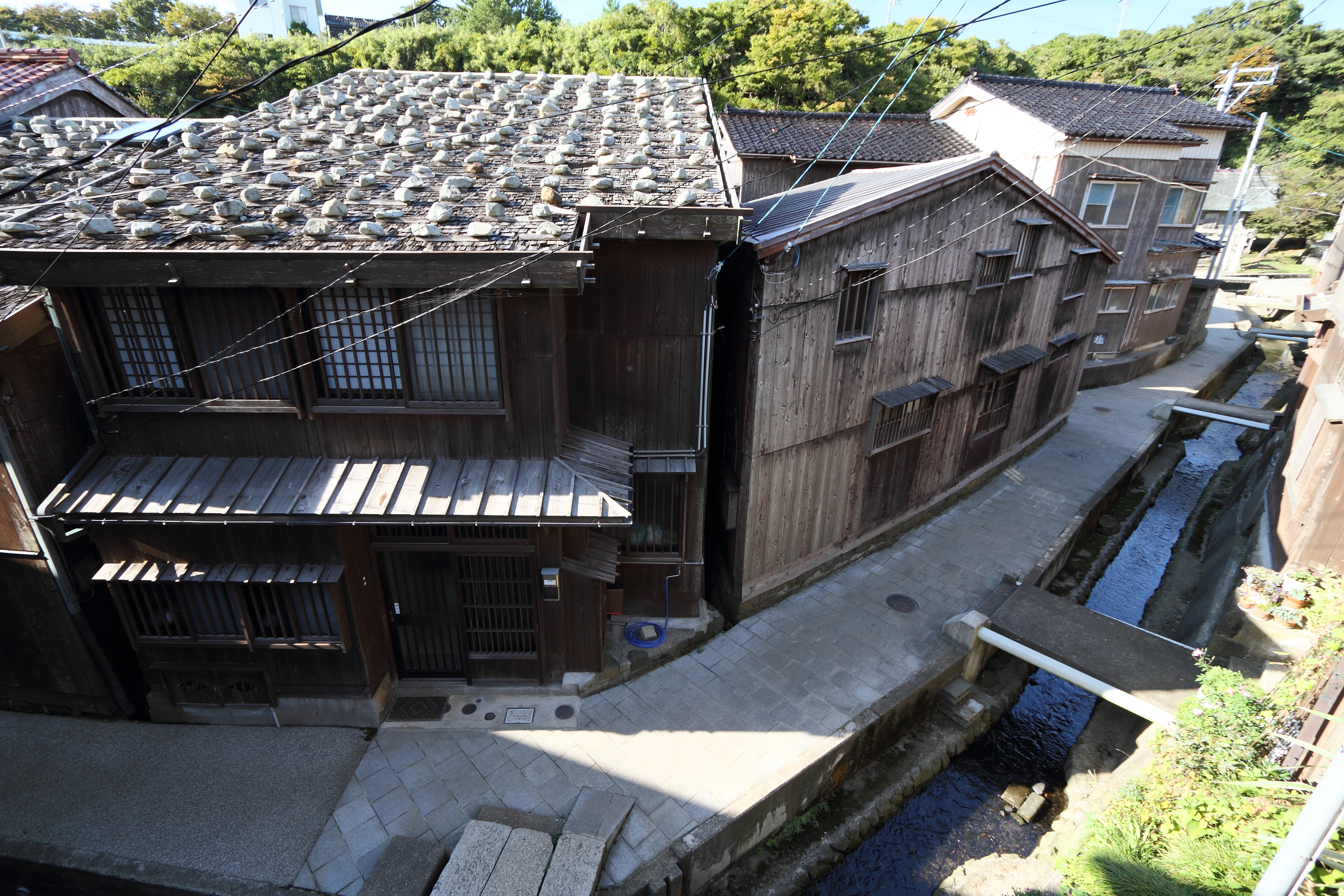
Shukunegi district in Sado Island (Important Preservation Districts for Groups of Traditional Buildings)

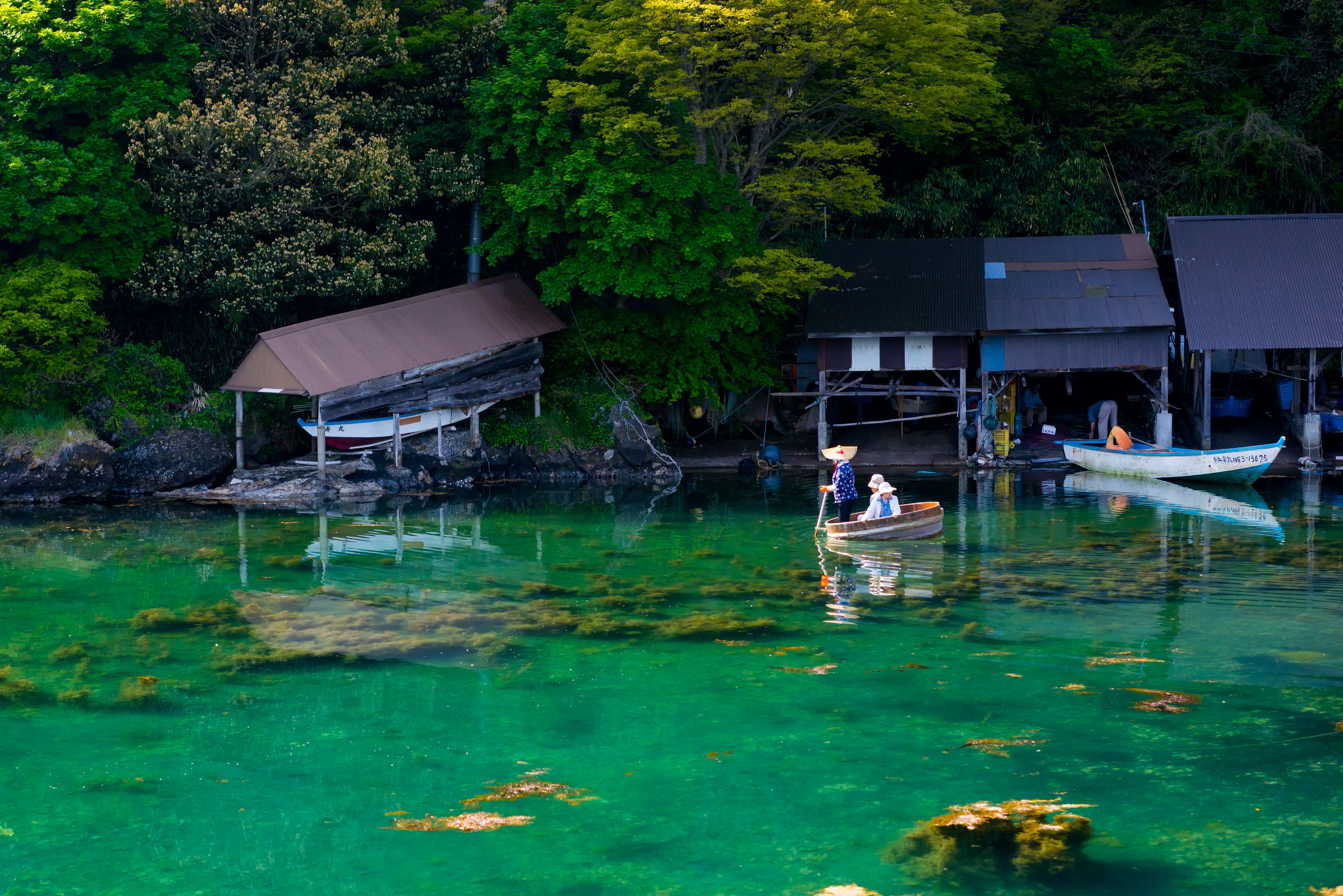
Tarai Bune in Sado Island

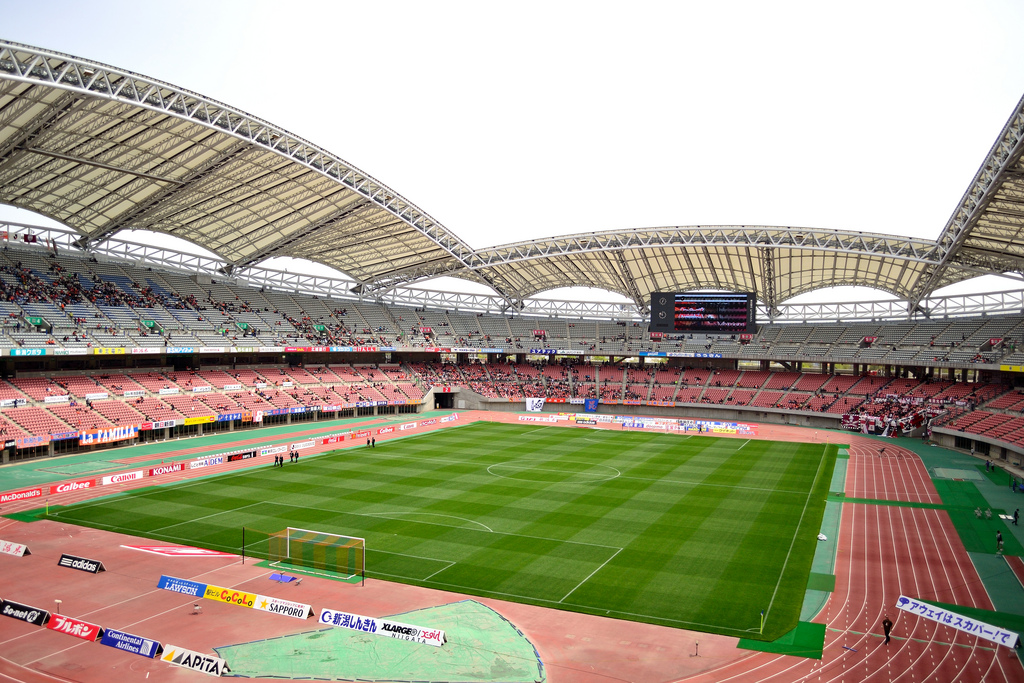
Bigswan Stadium

== Festivals ==
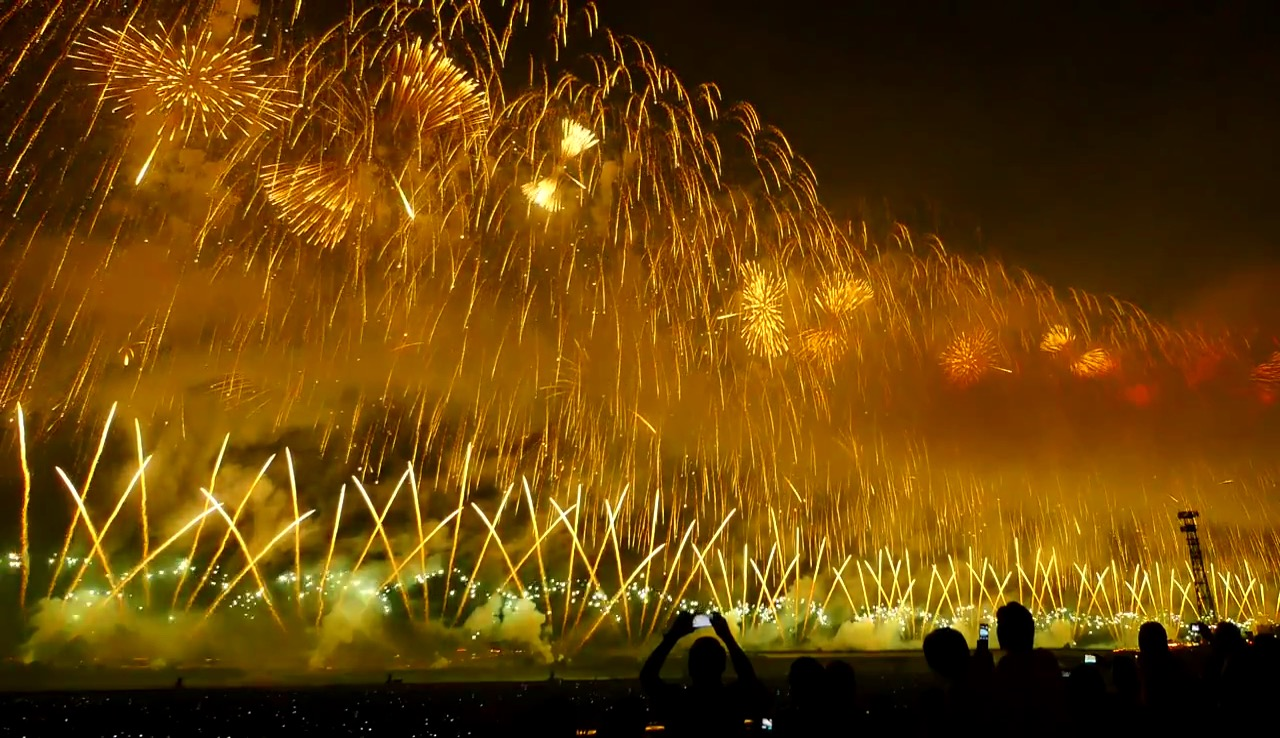
Nagaoka Festival (with fireworks)

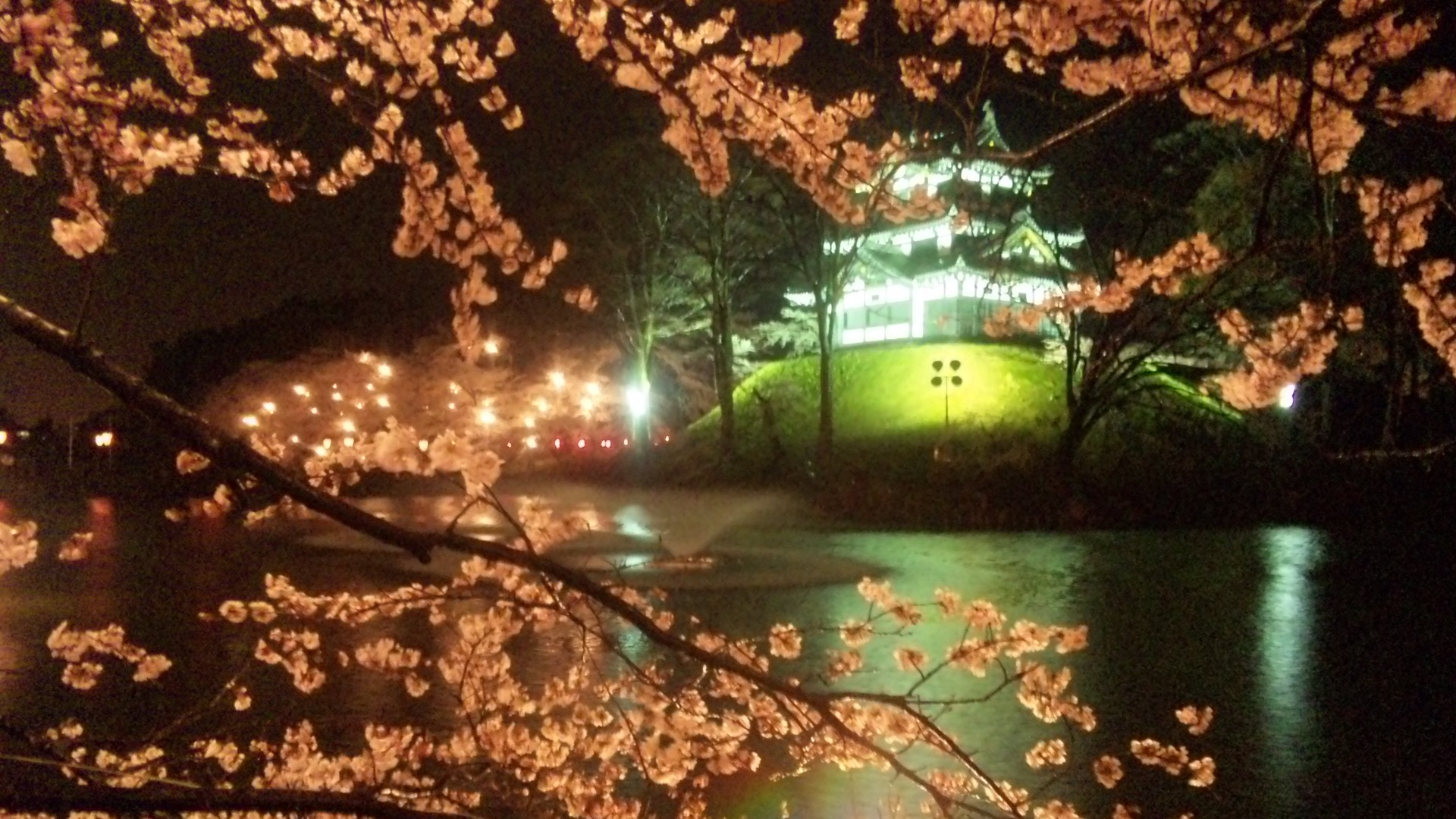
Night cherry blossoms and Takada castle

- Tokamachi Snow Festival- February
- Murakami Taisai – July 6–7
- Iwafune Taisai – October 18–19, in Murakami
- Niigata Festival – August
- Niigata General Dancing Event -September 21–25
- Shirone Kite Festival – June
- Sanjo Kite Festival – June
- Nagaoka Festival (with fireworks) – August
- Niigata Tanrei Sake-no-Jin – March
- Echigo-Tsumari Festival – August and September (every third year)

== Education ==
=== Universities ===
- International University of Japan
- Keiwa Gakuen University
- Nagaoka University
- Nagaoka University of Technology
- Nagaoka Institute of Design
- Niigata Sangyo University (Niigata Industrial University)
- Niigata University
- Nippon Dental University
- Niigata College of Nursing
- Niigata University of Health and Welfare
- Niigata University of International and Information Studies
- Niigata University of Management
- Niigata University of Pharmacy and Applied Life Sciences
- Niigata Institute of Technology

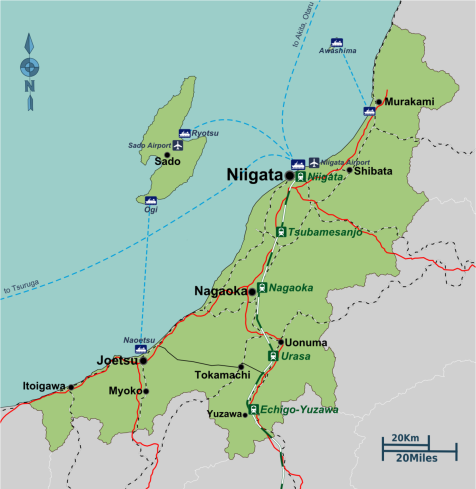
Transport Map of Niigata Prefecture Red= Expressway, Green= Shinkansen, Black= Railway

== Transport ==
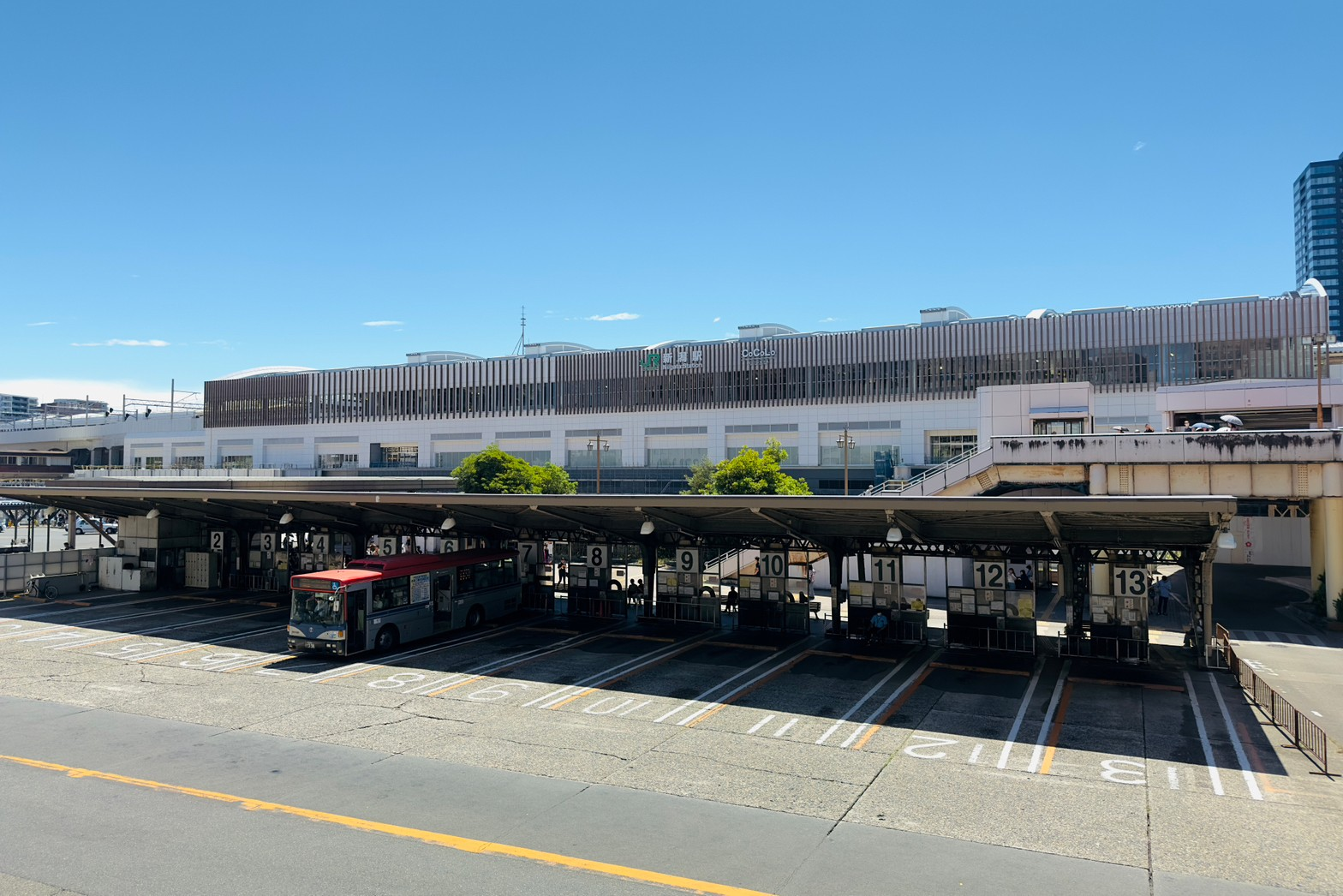
Niigata Station

=== Rail ===
- Echigo Tokimeki Railway
  - Myōkō Haneuma Line
  - Nihonkai Hisui Line
- Hokuetsu Express
  - Hokuhoku Line
- JR East
  - Ban'etsu West Line
  - Echigo Line
  - Iiyama Line
  - Hakushin Line
  - Hokuriku Shinkansen
  - Jōetsu Line
  - Jōetsu Shinkansen
  - Shin'etsu Line
  - Tadami Line
  - Uetsu Line
  - Yahiko Line
  - Yonesaka Line
- JR West
  - Hokuriku Shinkansen
  - Ōito Line
- Ainokaze Toyama Railway Line

=== Roads ===
==== Expressways ====
- E17 Kanetsu Expressway
- E18 Jōshinetsu Expressway
- E8 Hokuriku Expressway
- E49 Ban-etsu Expressway
- E7 Nihonkai Tōhoku Expressway

==== National highways ====
- Route 7 (Niigata—Shibata—Murakami—Sakata—Akita—Noshiro—Hirosaki—Aomori)
- Route 8 (Niigata—Nagaoka—Kashiwazaki—Jōetsu—Toyama—Kanazawa—Tsuruga—Kyoto)
- Route 17 (Nagaoka—Ojiya—Minamiuonuma—Takasaki—Nihonbashi of Tokyo)
- Route 18 (Jōetsu—Myōkō—Nagano—Karuizawa—Takasaki)
- Route 49 (Niigata—Aizuwakamatsu—Kōriyama—Iwaki)
- Route 113 (Niigata—Arakawa—Nan'yō—Shiroishi—Sōma)
- Route 116 (Niigata—Tsubame—Izumozaki—Kashiwazaki)
- Route 117 (Ojiya—Tōkamachi—Iiyama)
- Route 148 (Itoigawa—Ōmachi)
- Route 252
- Route 253
- Route 289
- Route 290
- Route 291
- Route 292
- Route 345
- Route 350 (Sado Island)
- Route 351
- Route 352
- Route 353
- Route 402
- Route 403
- Route 404
- Route 405
- Route 459
- Route 460

=== Ports ===
- Iwafune Port in Murakami- Ferry route to Awashima
- Naoetsu Port in Joetsu – Ferry route to Ogi
- Niigata Port – Ferry route to Sado Island (Ryotsu), Tsuruga, Akita, Otaru and Tomakomai, with International Container hub port
- Ogi Port – Ferry route to Naoetsu
- Ryotsu Port – Ferry route to Niigata

=== Airports ===
- Niigata Airport
- Sado Airport

== Notable individuals ==
=== Politics and military ===
- Masako, Empress of Japan, former registered domicile (Honseki) was Murakami
- Uesugi Kenshin (1530–1578), daimyō in the Sengoku period
- Naoe Kanetsugu (1559–1620), samurai in the Sengoku period
- Horibe Yasubei (1670–1703), samurai in the Edo period
- Hachirō Arita (1884–1965), foreign minister, from Sado Island
- Maejima Hisoka (1835–1919), founder of the Japanese postal service, from Joetsu
- Masuda Takashi (1848–1938), creation of a general trading company, Mitsui Bussan. established a newspaper, Nihon Keizai Shimbun. from Sado Island
- Kita Ikki (1883–1937), nationalist author and intellectual, from Sado Island
- Sakae Ōsugi (1885–1923), anarchist, lived in Shibata
- Homma Masaharu (1887–1946) World War II Lieutenant General executed by the United States for war crimes committed in the Philippines
- Hitoshi Imamura (1886–1968) World War II General in the Imperial Japanese Army, from Shibata high school
- Isoroku Yamamoto (1884–1943) World War II Admiral commander of the Imperial Japanese Navy, from Nagaoka
- Chiang Kai-shek (1887–1975), Chinese political and military leader, served in the Imperial Japanese Army from 1909 to 1911 in Joetsu (Takada)
- Ba Maw (1893–1977), Burmese political leader, active during the interwar and World War II, lived in Minamiuonuma (Ichiuchi)
- Kakuei Tanaka (1918–1993), prime minister, from Kashiwazaki
- Hisashi Owada (born 1932), diplomat and father of Crown Princess Masako, from Shibata
- Makiko Tanaka (born 1944), first female foreign minister, from Kashiwazaki

=== Arts and culture ===
- Zeami Motokiyo (1363– 1443), aesthetician, actor, and playwright, exile to Sado Island
- Ryōkan (1758–1831), Zen Buddhist monk and poet, from Izumozaki
- Etsu Inagaki Sugimoto, (1874–1950), autobiographer and novelist, Professor of literature and taught Japanese language, culture and history at Columbia University, from Nagaoka
- Yaichi Aizu (1881–1956), poet, calligrapher and historian, from Niigata City
- Kokei Kobayashi (1883–1957), Nihonga painter, from Joetsu
- Mimei Ogawa (1882–1961), author of short stories, children's stories, and fairy tales, from Joetsu
- Koganei Yoshikiyo (1859–1944), anatomist and anthropologist, from Nagaoka
- Kyusaku Ogino (1882–1975), doctor specializing in obstetrics and gynecology, Niigata Takeyama Hospital
- Kinichiro Sakaguchi (1897–1994), agricultural chemist and microbiologist, from Joetsu
- Takashi Amano (1954–2015), photographer and aquarist, from Niigata
- Tetsuji Morohashi (1883– 1982) chief editor of the Dai Kan-Wa jiten, a comprehensive dictionary of Chinese characters, from Sanjo
- Tetsuo Harada (born 1949 Niitsu-shi), sculptor working in Paris France
- Tsuchida Bakusen (1887–1936), Japanese painter, from Sado
- Fubō Hayashi (1900–1935), novelist from Sado Island
- Inoue Enryō (1858–1919), Buddhist philosopher, from Nagaoka
- Junzaburō Nishiwaki (1894–1982), Japanese poet and literary critic, from Ojiya
- Daigaku Horiguchi (1892–1981), poet and translator of French literature, from Nagaoka
- Makoto Aida (born 1965), Artist, from Niigata City
- Donald Keene (born 1922), Japanese scholar, historian, teacher, writer and translator of Japanese literature, Honorary Citizen of Kashiwazaki
- Kodo (taiko group), Based in Sado

Actors, Actresses, Singers

- Ken Watanabe (born 1959), stage, TV and film actor, from Uonuma
- Princess Tenko (born 1959), magician, from Joetsu
- Mina Fujii (born 1998), actress
- Mikie Hara (born 1987), gravure idol and actress, from Murakami
- Fumika Baba (born 1995), actress and model, from Niigata City
- Maya Kobayashi (born 1979), journalist and newscaster, from Ojiya
- Mao Kobayashi (actress) (born 1982), newscaster and former actress, from Ojiya
- Miyuki Koizumi (born 1982), Model
- Kazuyuki Sekiguchi (born 1955), bass player for the rock group Southern All Stars, from Agano
- Makoto Ogawa (born 1987), former member of Morning Musume, actor and model, from Kashiwazaki
- Koharu Kusumi (born 1992), former member of Morning Musume, actor and model, from Washima
- Hitomi Saito (born 1981), former singer of leader of Melon Kinenbi, from Niigata City
- Suneohair (born 1971), singer, from Nagaoka
- Yasuyuki Okamura (born 1965), from Niigata Higashi High School
- Double (singer) (born 1975), Japanese R&B singer
- Negicco, based in Niigata City, Niigata
- NGT48, based on Niigata City, Niigata
- Rina Sawayama (born 1990), singer, actress, and model, born in Niigata City, Niigata

Pop culture, manga, voice actors

- One (manga artist) (1986), mangaká, from Niigata City
- Yoshifumi Kondō (1950–1998), animator, from Gosen
- Hiroyuki Yamaga (born 1962), anime director and producer, and a founding member of the animation studio Gainax, from Niigata City
- Daisuke Hirakawa (born 1973), voice actor
- Ryō Hirohashi (born 1977), voice actress, from Nagaoka
- Yoko Ishida (born 1973), singer, from Niigata City
- Rumi Kasahara (born 1970), voice actress, from Itoigawa
- Makoto Kobayashi (born 1958), manga artist, from Niigata City
- Közi (born 1972), rock musician
- Haruo Minami (1923–2001), enka singer, from Nagaoka
- Hitomi Nabatame (born 1976), voice actress, from Sado Island
- Tatsuyuki Nagai (born 1976), anime director
- Kazuto Nakazawa (born 1968), animator
- Kenichi Suzumura (born 1974), voice actor
- Kiriko Nananan (born 1972), manga artist, from Tsubame
- Yukari Nozawa (born 1957), actor and voice actor
- Takeshi Obata (born 1969), manga artist, from Niigata City
- Etsushi Ogawa (born 1969), manga artist
- Ikue Otani (born 1965), voice actress, from Kashiwazaki
- Ango Sakaguchi (1906–1955), novelist and essayist, from Niigata City
- Daisuke Sakaguchi (born 1973), voice actor, from Kashiwazaki
- Shuichi Shigeno (born 1958), manga artist, from Tōkamachi
- Bin Shimada (born 1954), voice actor, from Niigata City
- Kunio Shimizu (1936–2021), playwright from Niigata
- Motoei Shinzawa (born 1958), manga artist, from Kashiwazaki
- Yōko Sōmi (born 1965), voice actress
- Rumiko Takahashi (born 1957), manga artist, from Niigata City
- Kazuya Tsurumaki (born 1966), animator, from Gosen
- Hajime Watanabe (born 1957), animator
- Nobuhiro Watsuki (born 1970), manga artist, from Nagaoka
- Hiroki Yagami (born 1967), manga artist, from Kashiwazaki
- Akiko Yajima (born 1967), voice actress, from Kashiwazaki
- Kimio Yanagisawa (born 1948), manga artist, from Gosen
- Keiko Yokozawa (born 1952), voice actress, from Niigata City

=== Sports ===
- Shiro Saigo (1866–1922), Judo, lived in Aga (Tsugawa), lived in 1869–1882
- Haguroyama Masaji (1914–1969), sumo wrestler from Nakanokuchi who was yokozuna for 12 years and three months; an all-time record
- Shohei Baba (1938–1999), Japanese professional wrestler, from Sanjō
- Sawao Kato (born 1946), winner of 12 Olympic medals in gymnastics
- Killer Khan (born 1947), professional wrestler, from Tsubame
- Ayumu Hirano (born 1998), snowboarder, from Murakami
- Ayana Onozuka (born 1988), freestyle skier, from Minamiuonuma
- Kentaro Minagawa (born 1977), alpine skier, from Yuzawa
- Junko Hoshino (born 1989), freestyle skier, from Nagaoka
- Reruhi Shimizu (born 1993), ski jumper, from Myoko
- Mai Nakamura (born 1979), swimmer, from Nagaoka
- Gōtoku Sakai (born 1991), footballer (2015– Hamburger SV), from Sanjo
- Yujiro Takahashi (born 1981), professional wrestler from Niigata City.

== See also ==
- Niigata Minamata disease
- Wara art
