= Yuzu koshō =

Japanese fermented citrus and chili paste

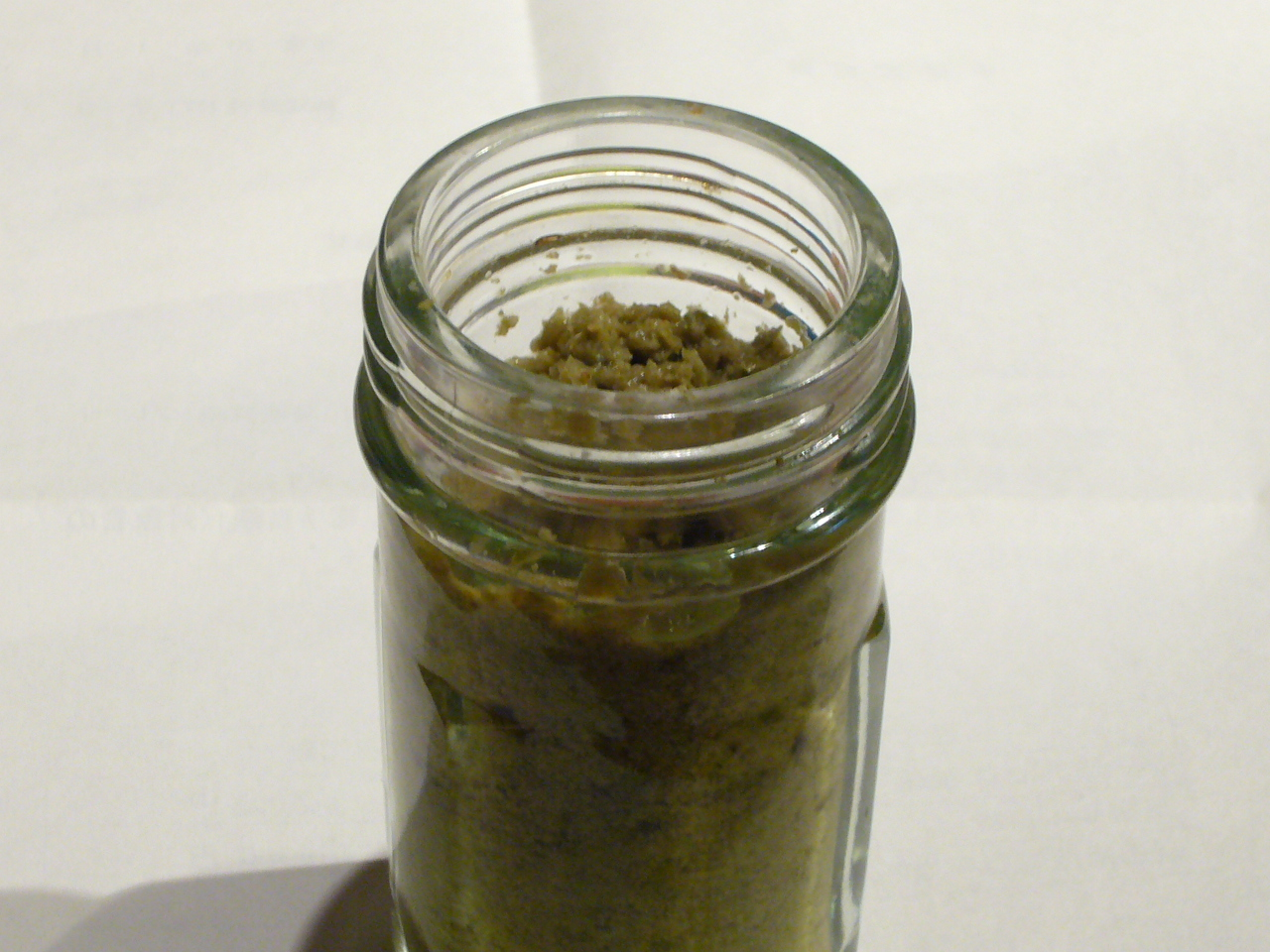
A bottle of yuzu koshō

Yuzu koshō (柚子胡椒; also yuzu goshō) is a type of Japanese seasoning. It is a paste made from chili peppers, yuzu peel and salt, which is then allowed to ferment. It is usually used as a condiment for nabemono dishes, miso soup, and sashimi. The most famous types of yuzu koshō come from Kyushu, where it is a local specialty.

== Characteristics ==
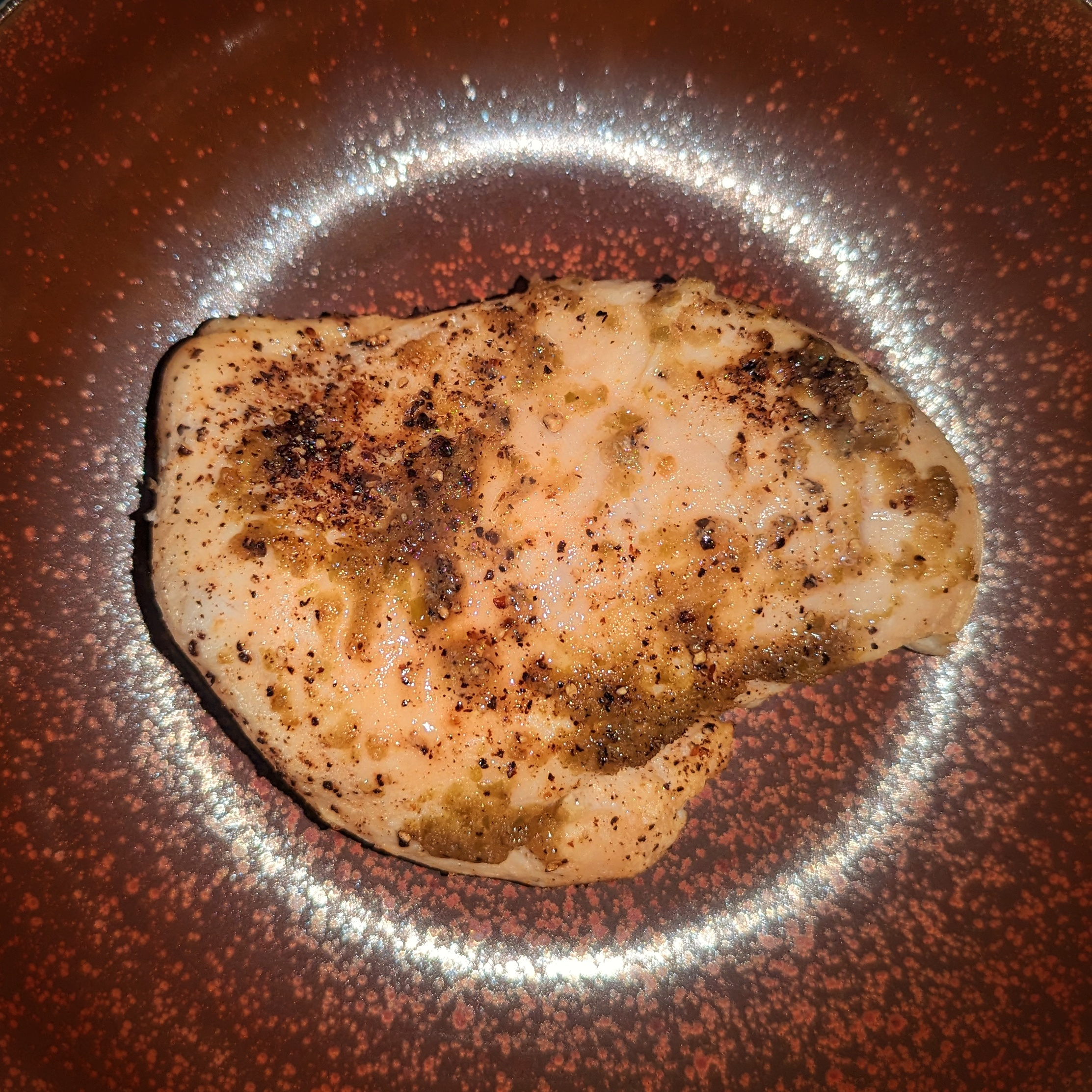
Chicken breast with yuzu koshō

The last pair of kanji in the name, koshō (胡椒), normally refers to black pepper; in the Kyushu dialects, however, they refer to chili peppers. Normally green chili peppers are used, but some versions use red peppers. Yuzu koshō made from green chilis is green, while using red chilis yields an orange paste.

Yuzu koshō is described as mildly spicy with acidic tones from the citrus.

== History ==
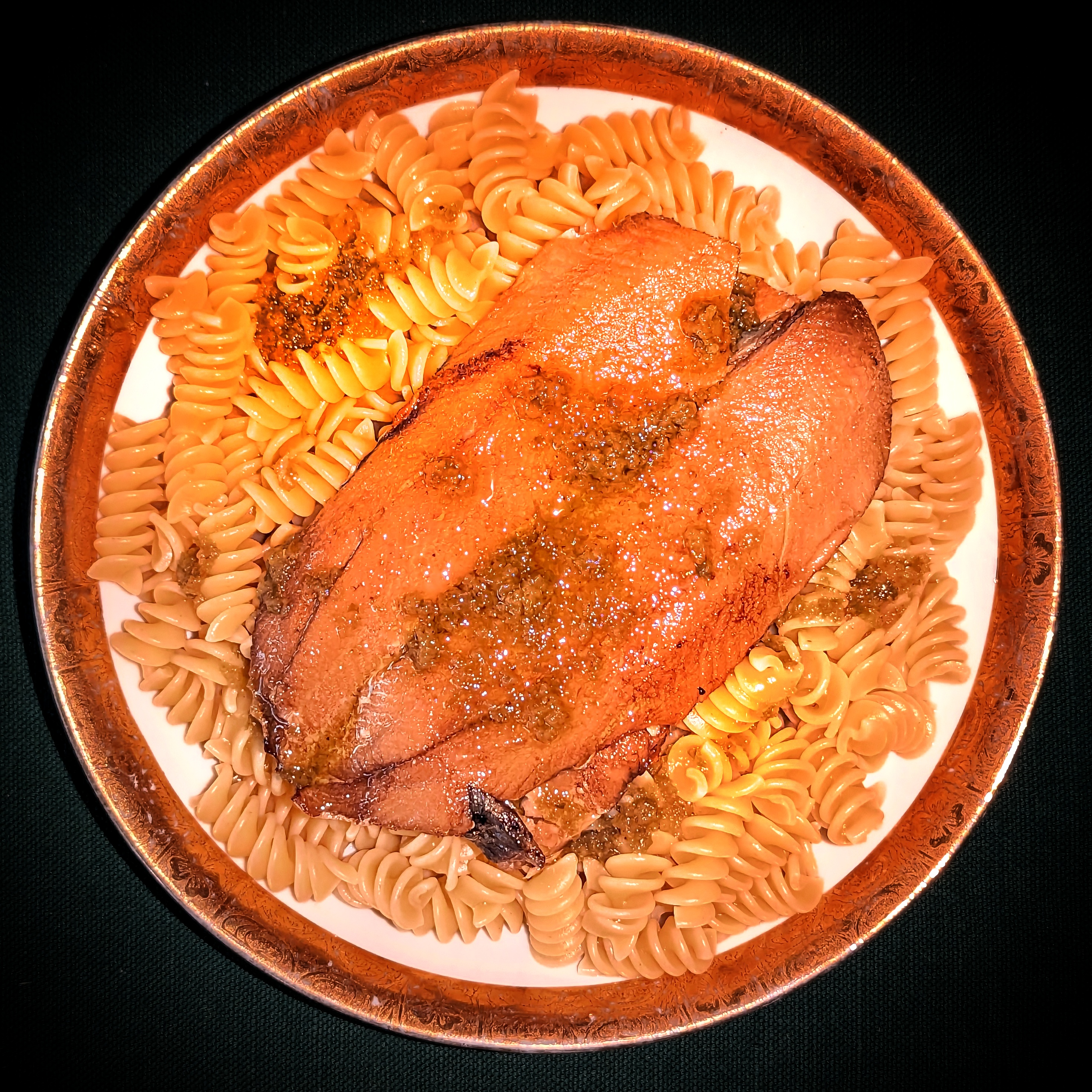
Smoked herring with yuzu koshō

There are theories that yuzu koshō was originally made in Hita, Ōita Prefecture and in Soeda, Fukuoka Prefecture.

One theory holds that several villages in Hita were the centers where yuzu cultivation became popular, and where yuzu koshō had been made by families for a long time. Another holds that a garden in Mount Hiko, a mountain located between Fukuoka and Oita and one of the three sacred mountains of Japan, has a yuzu tree where yamabushi first created yuzu koshō. The process has been passed down through the generations of yamabushi.

=== Popularity ===
Originally yuzu koshō was made by families, but mass-produced versions showed up on the market. It grew in popularity after being offered as a souvenir in the hot spring town of Yufuin Onsen. It grew even more in popularity when Fundokin (フンドーキン), a major producer of shoyu and miso in Kyushu, began making yuzu koshō. Recently it has become available in supermarkets in the Kanto region. In recent years, major producers like House Foods, S&B Foods, McCormick & Company, and Lion have started selling it. A version of yuzu koshō in a tube has appeared on the market. Tankan koshō is a similar product using the more orange-like citrus tankan.

== Use ==
Originally, yuzu koshō was used in nabemono, but it is now also found as a condiment for tsukune, udon, miso, sashimi, tempura, and yakitori. Since becoming generally available throughout Japan, it is also used in spaghetti, salads, tonkatsu, ramen, and shumai.

Large-scale manufacturers have also started using the flavoring in their products. Calbee makes snack foods such as potato chips that are flavored as yuzu koshō, but they are found in only certain locations. Ezaki Glico makes Pretz with the flavoring, and Meiji makes a curly corn chip that is sold only in Kyushu. Kameda makes fried mochi chips and senbei as well. However, as snacks must not have any moisture in them, the flavoring is created by combining yuzu powder and chili powder, and real yuzu koshō is not used. In Kyushu, Kit Kats with yuzu koshō flavor are sold.

== See also ==
- Kanzuri
- Chili pepper paste
