= Flag of Niigata Prefecture =

Japanese prefectural flag

Niigata Prefecture

The flag of Niigata Prefecture (Japanese: 新潟県旗, Hepburn: Niigata-ken ki) is a red field charged in the center with a stylized representation of the prefecture's name in golden kanji and katakana. It was adopted alongside the prefectural emblem upon the enactment of a 23 August 1963 prefectural notice, which also outlines the symbols' exact designs and construction. The flag and emblem of Niigata Prefecture are symbols of the prefectural government and their use is limited to government activities; however, non-governmental organizations and individuals can formally request from the prefectural governor to use them in an unofficial capacity.

== Design and symbolism ==
Emblem of Niigata Prefecture

The flag's charge is the emblem of Niigata Prefecture (新潟県章, Niigata-ken shō), which was established alongside the prefectural flag by a 23 August 1963 prefectural notice. The circular pattern is a stylized representation of the katakana for gata (ガタ), with a stylized version of the kanji for nii (新) centered at the top. The emblem symbolizes harmony, hope, and a desire for the "smooth development" of the prefecture.

=== Construction ===
The exact dimensions and colors of the flag and emblem are outlined in the prefectural notice that established them. The flag has a width-to-length ratio of 2:3. The katakana for gata has a diameter equal to 46% of the flag's length, while the kanji for nii has a height approximate to 17% of the flag's length or 37% of the katakana's diameter. The width of the hirgana "bands" is approximately 5% of the flag's length or 11% of the katakana's diameter. The flag is a red field charged with a golden emblem, although the prefectural notice permits the use of white for the emblem.

== Protocol ==
The flag and emblem are symbols of the Niigata Prefectural Government and their use is restricted to official government activities. However, non-governmental organizations and individuals can make a formal request to the Governor of Niigata Prefecture to use the flag or emblem for unofficial purposes. The governor may reject the application if they believe the symbols will be misused for commercial, personal or criminal purposes.
