= Jōetsu region =

Region within Niigata Prefecture, Japan

Jōetsu region (上越地方, Jōetsu-chihō) is a geographical region within Niigata Prefecture, Japan. It includes of the cities of Jōetsu, Itoigawa and Myōkō.

== History ==
The historical Jōetsu region is in the area of the old provinces of Kōzuke and Echigo. The region is traditionally known as a less developed area of Japan.

The Joetsu area is a strategic hub in the larger regional transport network.
