= 2004 Chūetsu earthquake =

Earthquake in Japan

- 新潟県中越地震
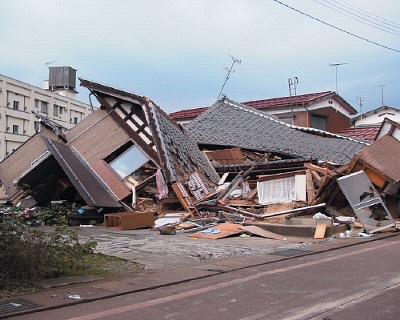
- Collapsed houses in Nagaoka City

- Location within Niigata Prefecture Location within Japan
- UTC time: 2004-10-23 08:56:00
- ISC event: 7421058
- USGS-ANSS: ComCat
- Local date: October 23, 2004
- Local time: 17:56:00 JST (UTC+9)
- Magnitude: M_{JMA} 6.8 M_{w} 6.6
- Depth: 13 km (8.1 mi)
- Fault: Muikamachi fault
- Type: Reverse
- Areas affected: Niigata, Fukushima, Gunma, Nagano and Saitama Prefectures, Japan
- Total damage: US$40 billion ((equivalent to $68.2 billion in 2025)
- Max. intensity: JMA 7 (MMI XI–XII)
- Peak acceleration: 2.56 g
- Landslides: 442+
- Aftershocks: 825+ recorded (as of 30/11/2004); M_{JMA} 6.5 on 23 October 2004 (strongest)
- Casualties: 68 fatalities, 4,805 injuries

The Chūetsu earthquake (中越地震, Chūetsu jishin) occurred in Niigata Prefecture, Japan, at 17:56:00 JST (08:56:00 UTC) on 23 October 2004. The Japan Meteorological Agency (JMA) officially named it the "Heisei 16 Niigata Prefecture Chūetsu Earthquake" (平成16年新潟県中越地震, Heisei ju-roku-nen Niigata-ken Chuetsu Jishin). The reverse-faulting shock achieved a maximum JMA seismic intensity of Shindo 7 and Modified Mercalli intensity of XI–XII (Extreme). It caused widespread destruction and casualties in Niigata Prefecture, while also causing damage and injuries in Fukushima, Gunma, Saitama and Nagano Prefectures.

At least 68 people were killed, of which 52 were disaster-related deaths aggravated by illnesses and stress attributed to the earthquake and its effects. More than 131,600 houses were damaged in four prefectures, of which 17,700 partially or fully collapsed. It caused economic losses of US$40 billion, which made it the second costliest natural disaster in history at the time.

== Tectonic setting ==
The northwestern side of Honshu lies on the southeastern margin of the Sea of Japan, an area of oceanic crust created by back-arc spreading from the late Oligocene to middle Miocene. The extensional tectonics associated with the spreading formed a series of N–S trending extensional faults and associated basins. Currently the area is being deformed by contractional tectonics, causing inversion of these earlier basins, forming anticlinal structures. The earthquake is thought to have occurred due to reverse movement on one of these reactivated faults.

== Earthquake ==
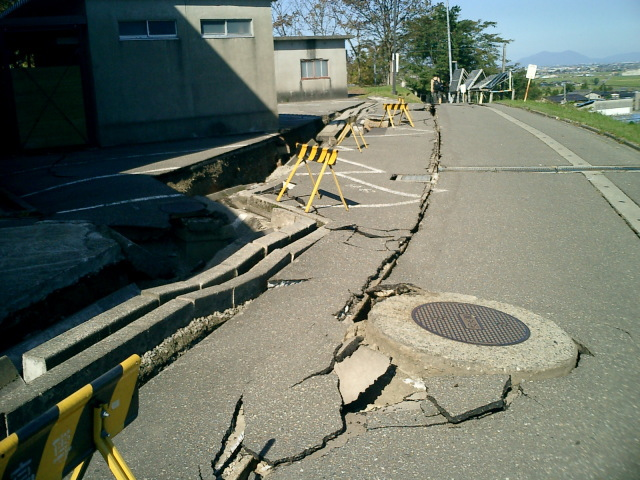
Severe damage to a road leading to the dormitory of Nagaoka University of Technology

The United States Geological Survey (USGS) recorded a moment magnitude of 6.6, while the Japan Meteorological Agency put the magnitude at 6.8.

At 18:03:12 JST (09:03:12 UTC), another event, with a magnitude of M_{w} 6.1 or M_{JMA} 6.3, struck near, with a maximum intensity of Shindo 5+ at Kawaguchi and Nagaoka. A third earthquake occurred at 18:11:57 JST (09:11:57 UTC), measuring M_{w} 5.8 or M_{JMA} 6.0 and having a maximum intensity of Shindo 6+ at Ojiya. A fourth event, measuring M_{w} 6.3 or M_{JMA} 6.5, struck at 18:34:04 JST (09:34:04 UTC) with a maximum intensity of Shindo 6+ in Kawaguchi, Nagaoka and Tōkamachi. Intervening and subsequent earthquakes of lesser intensity also shook the region. Within 116 hours of the mainshock, 15 earthquakes with intensities of Shindo 5− or higher struck the Chūetsu region.

The mainshock was caused by a rupture on the Muikamachi fault. The focal mechanism of the earthquake suggests a rupture on a reverse fault along a northeast-trending plane dipping northwest. The rupture lasted up to 15 seconds, extending up to 20–30 km (12–19 mi) by 14–25 km (8.7–15.5 mi), with the greatest slip being concentrated within 10 km (6.2 mi) of the hypocenter.

=== Ground effects ===
GPS observations revealed that Ojiya experienced a horizontal movement of 8.1 cm (3.2 in) in a west-southwestern direction and an uplift of 26.5 cm (10.4 in), while Sumon experienced a horizontal movement of 21 cm (8.3 in) in a west-northwestern direction and subsidence of up to 6.3 cm (2.5 in). The earthquake also triggered at least 442 documented landslides in Niigata Prefecture, resulting in six fatalities. The earthquake struck several days after Typhoon Tokage made landfall in the country, with heavy rainfall associated with the typhoon contributing to at least 37 mudslides triggered by the earthquake. Observed modes of landslides and slope failure included translational soil slips, deepseated rotational slumps and debris flows.

=== Intensity ===
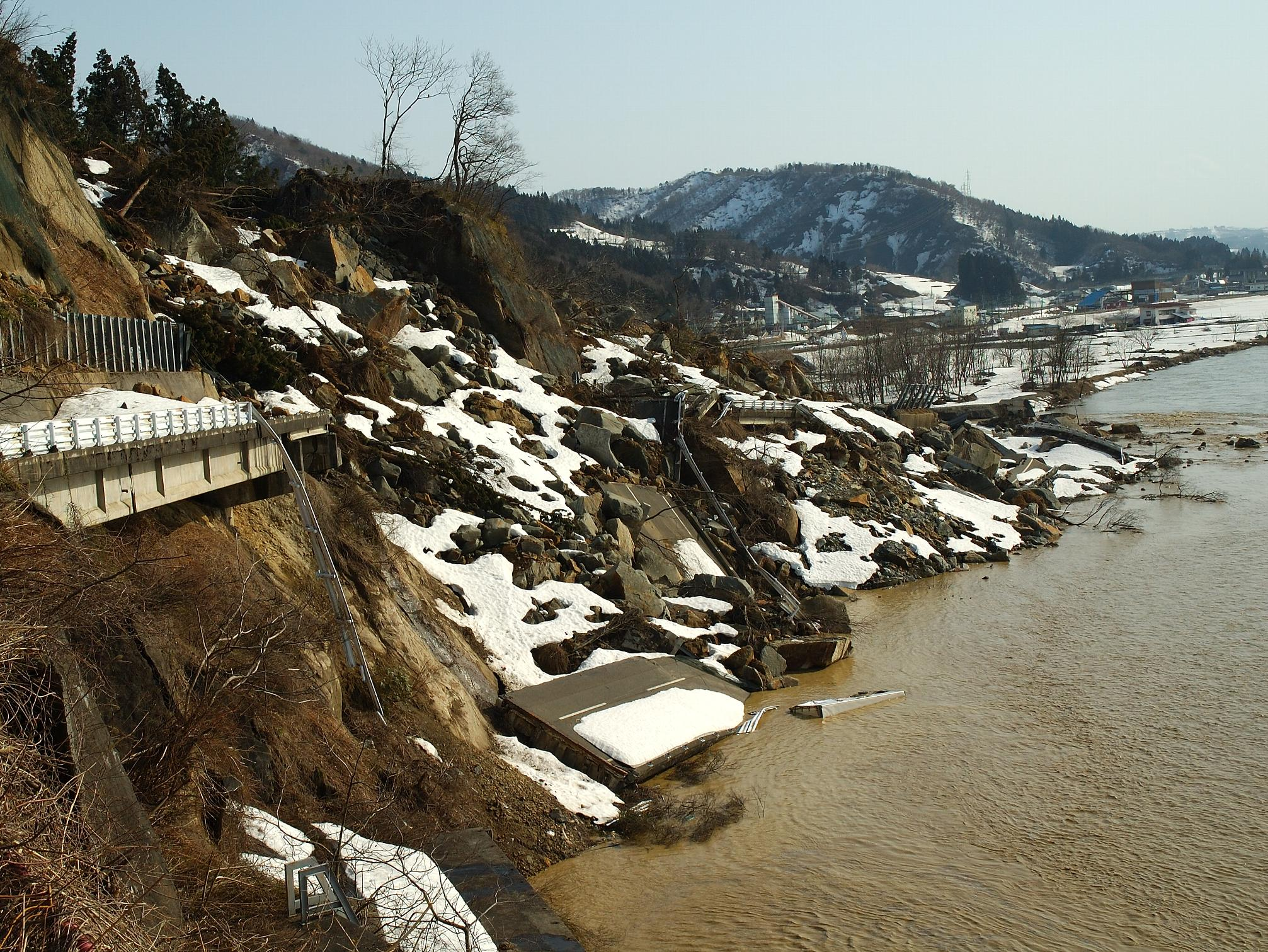
A road destroyed by a landslide in Myoken, Nagaoka City

The earthquake achieved 7 on the Japanese Shindo intensity scale at Kawaguchi, Niigata, making it the second earthquake to reach such intensity after the 1995 Kobe earthquake. It is also the time Shindo 7 was observed after the JMA scale's latest revision in 1996. It corresponded to a maximum Modified Mercalli intensity (MMI) of XI–XII (Extreme). According to the USGS, around 206,000 people were exposed to shaking corresponding to MMI IX (Violent), 261,500 were exposed to MMI VIII (Severe) shaking and 1.38 million others were subjected to shaking levels of MMI VI-VII (Strong-Very strong). A peak ground acceleration of 2,515 gal (2.56 g) was recorded in Kawaguchi, Niigata, with an acceleration of 1,500 gal (1.53 g) recorded at Ojiya.

Locations with a seismic intensity of Shindo 5− and higher
Intensity	Prefecture	Locations
7	Niigata	Kawaguchi
6+	Niigata	Ojiya, Yamakoshi, Oguni
6−	Niigata	Nagaoka, Tokamachi, Tochio, Koshiji, Mishima, Horinouchi, Hirokami, Sumon, Irihirose, Kawanishi, Nakasato, Kariwa
5+	Niigata	Minamiuonuma, Tsunan, Jōetsu, Izumozaki, Mitsuke
5−	Niigata	Kashiwazaki, Sanjō, Tsubame, Nishikan-ku, Kamo, Niigata City
5−	Fukushima	Tadami, Yanaizu, Nishiaizu
5−	Nagano	Iizuna
5−	Gunma	Katashina, Shibukawa, Takasaki
5−	Saitama	Kuki

== Aftershocks ==
Throughout 23 October, 164 aftershocks were recorded in Niigata Prefecture, with 110 additional aftershocks occurring on 24 October. Aftershocks continued, with a total of 600 perceptible events recorded by 31 October and 825 overall by 30 November 2004. Most of these aftershocks were distributed within a 30 km (19 mi) 20 km (12 mi) area.

List of aftershocks with a seismic intensity of Shindo 5− and higher
Time (JST)	Epicenter	Magnitude (USGS)	Magnitude (JMA)	Intensity (Shindo)	Depth	Notes
23 October 17:59:37	37.268°N 138.866°E	M_{w} 5.7	M_{JMA} 5.3	5+	10 km (6 mi) (USGS); 16 km (10 mi) (JMA)	
23 October 18:03:12	37.318°N 138.816°E	M_{w} 6.1	M_{JMA} 6.3	5+	10.5 km (7 mi) (USGS); 9 km (6 mi) (JMA)	
23 October 18:07:31	37.285°N 138.772°E	M_{w} 5.4	M_{JMA} 5.7	5+	10 km (6 mi) (USGS); 15 km (9 mi) (JMA)	
23 October 18:11:57	37.239°N 138.608°E	M_{w} 5.8	M_{JMA} 6.0	6+	18 km (11 mi) (USGS); 12 km (7 mi) (JMA)	
23 October 18:34:04	37.318°N 138.808°E	M_{w} 6.3	M_{JMA} 6.5	6+	10 km (6 mi) (USGS); 14 km (9 mi) (JMA)	
23 October 18:57:26	37.193°N 138.745°E	M_{w} 5.6	M_{JMA} 5.3	5+	10 km (6 mi) (USGS); 8 km (5 mi) (JMA)	
23 October 19:36:45	37.225°N 138.640°E	M_{w} 5.7	M_{JMA} 5.3	5−	10 km (6 mi) (USGS); 11 km (7 mi) (JMA)	
23 October 19:45:57	37.305°N 138.655°E	M_{w} 5.7	M_{JMA} 5.7	6−	10 km (6 mi) (USGS); 12 km (7 mi) (JMA)	
24 October 14:21:34	37.266°N 138.633°E	M_{w} 4.8	M_{JMA} 5.0	5+	10 km (6 mi) (USGS); 11 km (7 mi) (JMA)	
25 October 00:28:08	37.187°N 138.676°E	M_{w} 5.2	M_{JMA} 5.3	5−	13.2 km (8 mi) (USGS); 10 km (6 mi) (JMA)	
25 October 06:04:57	37.308°N 138.701°E	M_{w} 5.7	M_{JMA} 5.8	5+	11 km (7 mi) (USGS); 15 km (9 mi) (JMA)	
27 October 10:40:50	37.284°N 138.885°E	M_{w} 6.0	M_{JMA} 6.1	6−	14.1 km (9 mi) (USGS); 12 km (7 mi) (JMA)	
4 November 09:57:28	37.434°N 138.752°E	M_{w} 5.3	M_{JMA} 5.2	5+	10 km (6 mi) (USGS); 18 km (11 mi) (JMA)	
8 November 11:15:58	37.396°N 138.862°E	M_{w} 5.5	M_{JMA} 5.9	5+	10 km (6 mi) (USGS); 0 km (0 mi) (JMA)	
10 November 03:43:08	37.368°N 138.825°E	M_{w} 5.1	M_{JMA} 5.3	5−	10.3 km (6 mi) (USGS); 5 km (3 mi) (JMA)	
28 December 03:43:08	37.239°N 138.787°E	M_{w} 4.8	M_{JMA} 5.0	5−	35.8 km (22 mi) (USGS); 8 km (5 mi) (JMA)	

== Impact ==
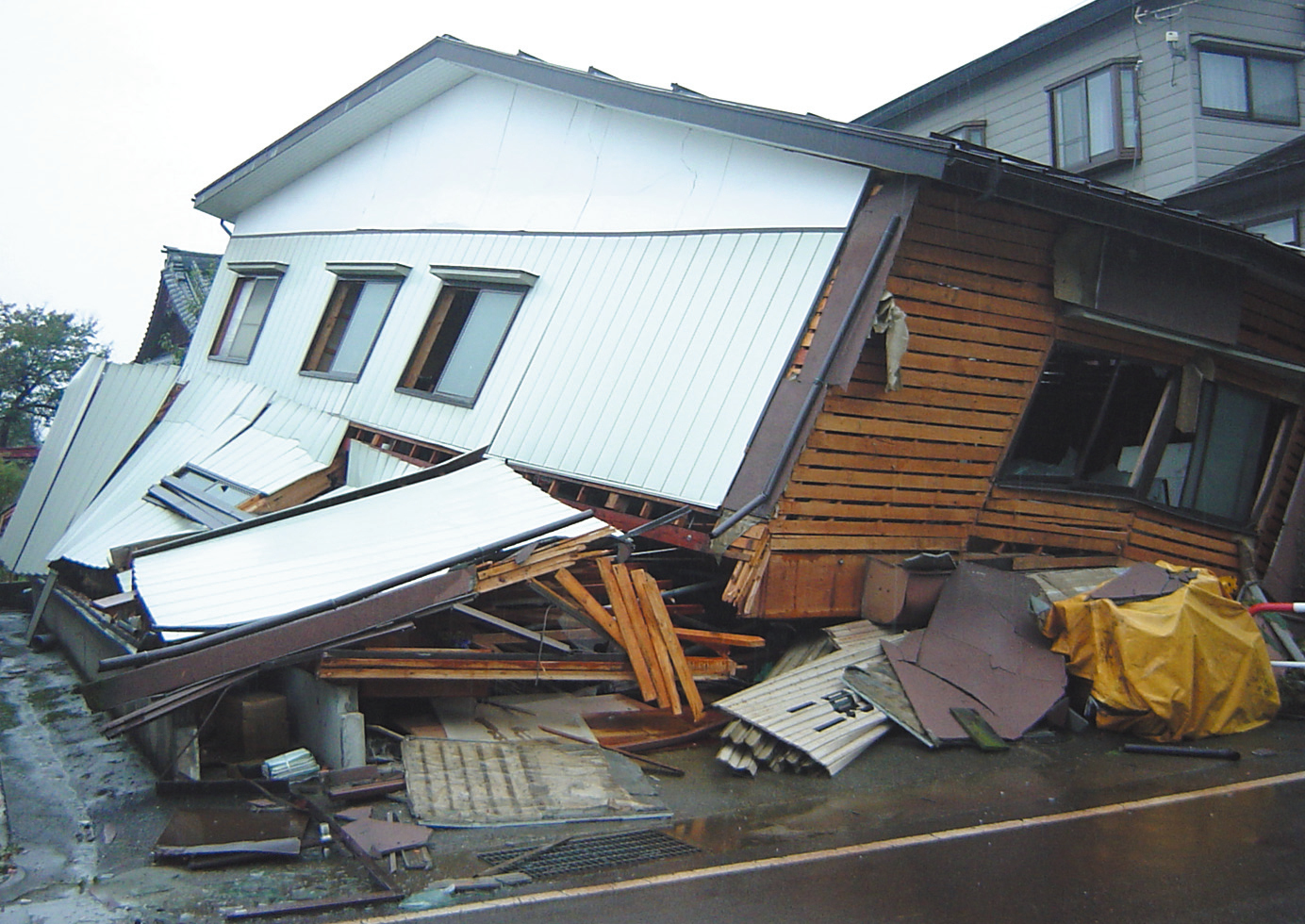
A collapsed house

=== Casualties ===
At least 68 fatalities and 4,805 injuries were related to the earthquake; all deaths and 4,795 injuries occurred in Niigata Prefecture, with 6 others injured in Gunma Prefecture, 3 in Nagano Prefecture and 1 in Saitama Prefecture. Of the 68 fatalities, 10 were caused by collapsing structures, 6 were killed by landslides and 52 died due to illnesses or stress related to the earthquake and its effects. At least 19 people died in Ojiya, 12 in Nagaoka, 8 in Tōkamachi, 6 in Kawaguchi, 5 in Yamakoshi, 3 each in Mitsuke and Koshiji, 2 in Yunotani, and 1 each in Yoshida, Yuzawa, Tsubame, Kawanishi, Yamato, Oguni, Tochio, Horinouchi, Koide and Hirokami. A landslide in Myoken, Nagaoka buried a car, killing a mother and one of her two children inside. One hospital patient also died when an artificial respirator detached during the earthquake, while five more died from complications due to sheltering in their cars, including blood clots from inactivity.

=== Damage ===
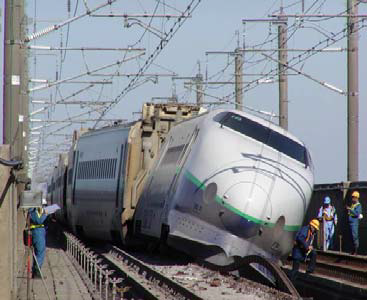
The earthquake caused the first derailment of a Shinkansen train during service

At least 3,175 homes were completely destroyed, 14,552 were partially destroyed and 113,912 others were damaged. At least 1,063 homes were damaged in Nagano, Fukushima and Gunma Prefectures, with the rest of the damage occurring in Niigata. The number of partially or fully collapsed houses by area include 5,977 in Nagaoka, 3,100 in Ojiya, 1,006 in Kawaguchi, 977 in Tōkamachi and 858 in Koshiji. Economic losses amounted to at least ¥6.28 trillion (US$40 billion), making it, at the time, the second costliest natural disaster in history behind the 1995 Kobe earthquake.

Housing damage, while heavy, was relatively light compared to the extreme ground motions from the earthquake. Most homes in the affected region were traditionally built with wood, bamboo and clay. Homes of this type performed very poorly in many Japanese earthquakes, particularly the 1995 Kobe and 2024 Noto earthquakes. In Niigata and nearby regions, traditional houses tend to have larger and more numerous interior columns and heavier roof beams to protect them from heavy snowfall, and many were built less than two decades prior to the earthquake, which in turn made them more resistant to earthquake shaking, although collapses were widespread in Ojiya and especially Kawaguchi.

Sewage and water mains ruptured, and gas and telephone services were cut off. Over 300,000 homes were affected by power outages, mainly in Ojiya and Nagaoka. Two tunnels along the Kan-etsu Expressway collapsed, and roads near the epicenter were severely damaged. In the Imo River basin of Yamakoshi, multiple landslide dams were formed by the earthquake, leaving officials concerned about potential flooding in the area, with 439 people living in 101 households temporarily evacuated.

For the first time in its 40-year history, a Shinkansen train derailed while in service, the train being too close to the epicenter to be halted by the automatic UrEDAS earthquake detection system. Eight out of ten cars of the Toki 325 service (a 200 Series Shinkansen train) derailed on the Joetsu Shinkansen line near Kawaguchi, between Nagaoka Station in Nagaoka and Urasa Station in Yamato; no injuries were reported among the 155 passengers. The railbed, bridges and tunnels were all affected.

Casualties and damage in Niigata Prefecture
Prefecture	Area	Fatalities	Injuries	Housing Damage			Max. Shindo
Prefecture	Area	Fatalities	Injuries	Fully Collapsed	Half Collapsed	Partially Damaged	Max. Shindo
Niigata	Nagaoka	12	2,108	927	5,969	48,954	6+
Niigata	Nakanoshima	-	18	-	26	2,612	5+
Niigata	Koshiji	3	93	152	835	2,764	6-
Niigata	Mishima	-	8	3	25	1,677	6-
Niigata	Yamakoshi	5	25	339	308	106	6+
Niigata	Oguni	1	24	125	644	1,214	6+
Niigata	Mitsuke	3	514	52	543	9,422	5+
Niigata	Tochio	1	92	45	300	5,781	6-
Niigata	Yoita	-	4	-	6	986	5+
Niigata	Washima	-	3	-	-	305	5+
Niigata	Izumozaki	-	1	-	7	100	5+
Niigata	Ojiya	19	785	622	2,835	8,995	6+
Niigata	Kawaguchi	6	62	606	543	449	7
Niigata	Horinouchi	1	148	56	259	1,492	6-
Niigata	Koide	1	74	1	19	1,129	5+
Niigata	Yunotani	2	22	-	-	386	5-
Niigata	Hirokami	1	48	12	76	1,226	6-
Niigata	Sumon	-	21	6	33	689	6-
Niigata	Irihirose	-	3	-	5	137	6-
Niigata	Muikamachi	-	15	3	1	846	5+
Niigata	Yamato	1	6	4	3	817	5+
Niigata	Shiozawa	-	5	-	-	707	5+
Niigata	Tokamachi	8	557	100	1,027	11,075	6-
Niigata	Kawanishi	1	25	5	87	1,559	6-
Niigata	Nakasato	-	9	-	9	659	6-
Niigata	Matsudai	-	1	-	3	350	5+
Niigata	Matsunoyama	-	2	-	-	90	5+
Niigata	Tsunan	-	13	-	1	233	5+
Niigata	Kashiwazaki	-	65	27	322	4,610	5-
Niigata	Takayanagi	-	-	-	3	268	5-
Niigata	Nishiyama	-	7	11	34	658	5-
Niigata	Kariwa	-	8	67	127	833	6-
Niigata	Bunsui	-	2	8	24	87	5-
Niigata	Sanjō	-	8	-	-	301	5-
Niigata	Sakae	-	3	-	9	517	5-
Niigata	Shitada	-	-	-	-	19	4
Niigata	Kamo	-	4	-	4	127	5-
Niigata	Teradomari, Niigata	-	1	-	15	586	5+
Niigata	Niigata City	-	4	-	-	-	5-
Niigata	Shirone	-	-	-	-	1	4
Niigata	Niitsu	-	1	-	-	-	4
Niigata	Kosudo	-	-	-	-	1	4
Niigata	Yokogoshi	-	1	-	-	-	4
Niigata	Kameda	-	1	-	-	-	4
Niigata	Tsubame	1	1	2	-	54	5-
Niigata	Myōkō	-	1	-	-	-	4
Niigata	Yoshida	1	-	-	-	2	5-
Niigata	Maki	-	1	-	-	-	5-
Niigata	Yuzawa	1	1	-	-	-	4
Niigata	Jōetsu	-	1	-	-	10	5+
Niigata	Yasuzuka	-	-	-	-	8	5+
Niigata	Uragawara	-	1	-	-	-	5-
Niigata	Maki	-	-	-	-	1	5-
Niigata	Kakizaki	-	-	-	-	2	5-
Niigata	Sanwa	-	-	-	-	4	5-
Total		68	4,795	3,175	14,552	112,849	7

== Response and aftermath ==
By 24 October, 98,000 households, most of them in Nagaoka and Ojiya, were still left without power; that number dropped to 34,000 on 26 October and 2,300 on 3 November. Damage assessments became difficult due to landslides and the disruption of communications in rural areas. There were reports of locals rescuing people from collapsed homes. By the morning of 24 October, the Japan Self-Defense Forces (JSDF) opened a disaster headquarters in Ojiya to coordinate relief efforts, and dispatched 300 personnel, 21 helicopters and 65 vehicles to transport food and water to evacuation sites. They also evacuated tens of thousands of residents to emergency shelters, and used helicopters to airlift stranded villagers from the hamlet of Shiotani. A Souryu serpentine robot was used to inspect a collapsed house, marking the first time a snakebot was used at a natural disaster site.

Rescuers found difficulties reaching the towns of Kawaguchi and Yamakoshi, whose residents had to depend on airlifted food and water until they could be rescued the following day. In Kawaguchi, about 300 people took refuge in an elementary school and awaited assistance. By the evening of 25 October, relief supplies were coming in over the roads, but still with not enough food for the population. In Yamakoshi, 250 residents spent two nights in a gymnasium without power or water before they were evacuated. All but six of Yamakoshi's 2,200 residents were evacuated and taken to three sites in Nagaoka. The national government applied the disaster relief law to 29 localities, which meant that government would cover the cost of relief and shelter. Over 82,000 people were evacuated to emergency shelters in total, including 34,000 in Nagaoka, with 14,500 people in Ojiya seeking refuge across 93 evacuation centers. On 25 October, thousands of people were airlifted from about 60 mountainous communities, which remained closed to road access. Thirty police and JSDF helicopters evacuated residents in seven municipalities. By 26 October, about 320 people were still stranded in five hamlets.

Aftershocks and landslide dams posed continuing problems. A M_{JMA} 5.2 aftershock of 4 November halted the Jōetsu Shinkansen line between Niigata and Nagaoka. A M_{JMA} 5.9 aftershock on 8 November again halted operations and closed a portion of the Kan-etsu Expressway. Continued rain during the ten days following the earthquake raised concerns about water behind landslide dams in Ojiya and Yamakoshi. The JMA set up alarm units and surveillance cameras at five landslide dams, Niigata Prefecture prepared pumps to lower water levels, and the prefecture asked 439 residents in 101 households to evacuate.

By 28 November, authorities attributed 40 deaths to the earthquake, with the death toll rising to 68 by October 2009. As a result of post-earthquake fatalities from stress-related illnesses, Niigata Prefecture encouraged people to move into JSDF tents or to stay in accommodations farther away. Elderly residents were especially susceptible to exposure and stress-related illnesses. Agricultural activities in Yamakoshi were disrupted by the earthquake, and residents feared permanent consequences. The village's main industry is the raising of carp, which it provides to ponds and lakes throughout Japan. Residents of the village also had to leave behind 1,000 cattle. In order to save his business, a cattle owner in Yamakoshi began to airlift 700 cattle out of the village by helicopter on 2 November, at considerable expense.

The Tokyo Stock Exchange fell on 25 October, with the largest losses to the East Japan Railway Company, companies with production facilities in Niigata, and insurers. However, The Japan Times reported on 1 November that shares of construction-related companies had increased sharply on the Tokyo Exchange, since investors anticipated a supplementary national budget to pay for reconstruction following the earthquake and recent typhoons. However, reconstruction became challenging to homeowners, since only 11.2% of households in Niigata Prefecture had earthquake insurance, compared to 17.2% nationally at the time.

=== In popular culture ===
The earthquake led to the cancellation of an episode of Pokémon: Advanced Battle, the eighth season of the Pokémon animated series. The episode, originally scheduled to air on 4 November 2004, would have featured multiple Whiscash causing an earthquake. The episode never aired in Japan or anywhere else in the world, and the move "Earthquake" was no longer featured in the animated series. The movie A Tale of Mari and Three Puppies was based on events that took place during the earthquake.

== See also ==
- List of earthquakes in 2004
- List of earthquakes in Japan
