= Ken Watanabe =

Japanese actor (born 1959)

- 渡辺 謙
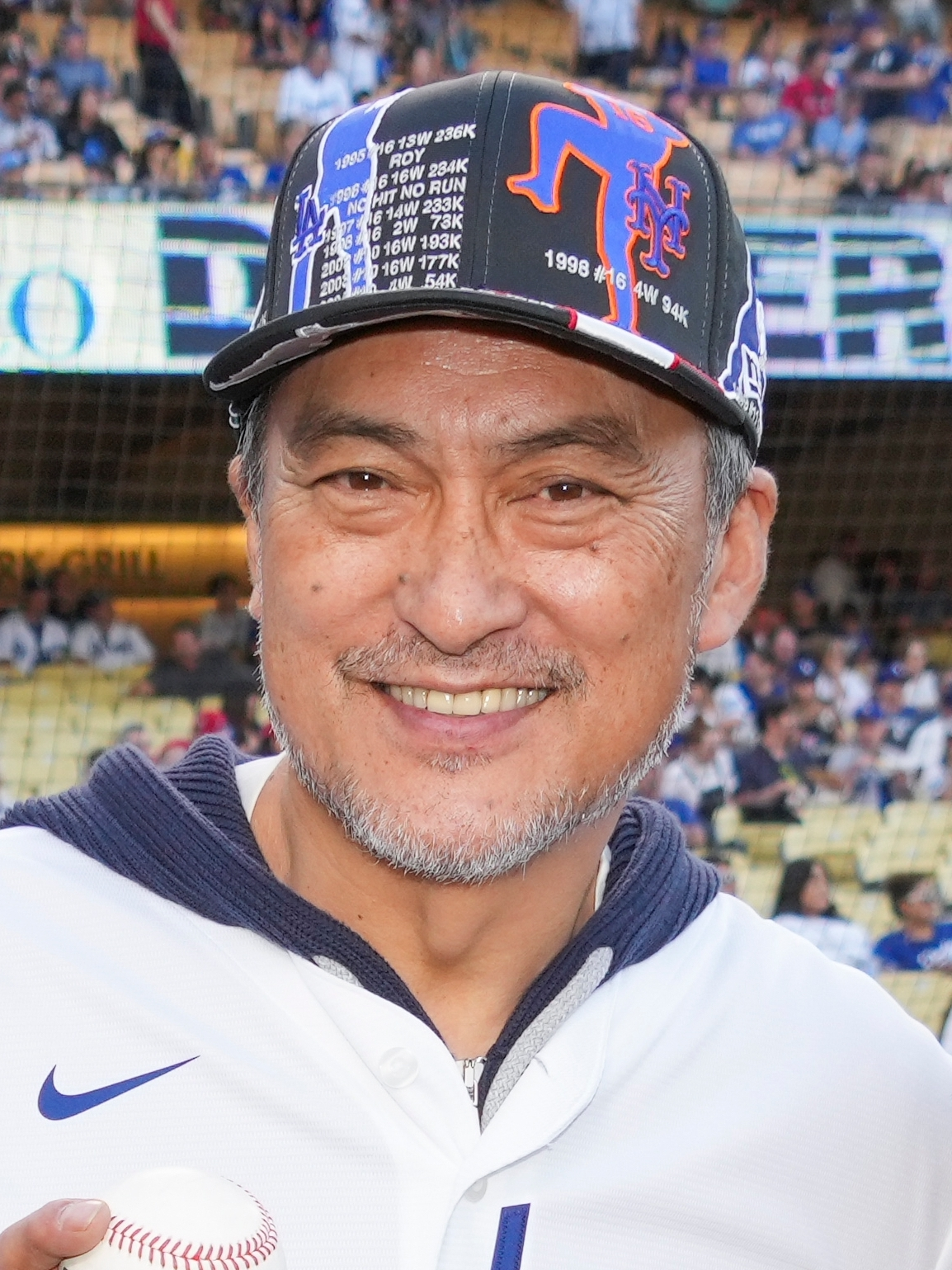
- Watanabe in 2022
- Born: October 21, 1959 (age 66); Hirokami, Niigata, Japan
- Occupation: Actor
- Years active: 1979–present
- Spouses: Yumiko Watanabe (m. 1983; div. 2005); Kaho Minami (m. 2005; div. 2018); Undisclosed (m. 2023)
- Children: 3, including Anne Watanabe
- Awards: Japan Academy Film Prize for Best Actor, 2007 and 2010

Ken Watanabe (渡辺 謙, Watanabe Ken; born October 21, 1959) is a Japanese actor. He is best known for playing tragic hero characters, such as General Tadamichi Kuribayashi in Letters from Iwo Jima and Lord Katsumoto Moritsugu in The Last Samurai, for which he was nominated for the Academy Award for Best Supporting Actor. Among other awards, Watanabe has won the Japan Academy Film Prize for Best Actor twice, in 2007 for Memories of Tomorrow and in 2010 for The Unbroken. He is also known for his roles in Christopher Nolan's films Batman Begins and Inception, as well as Memoirs of a Geisha, and Pokémon Detective Pikachu.

In 2014, he starred in the reboot Godzilla as Dr. Ishiro Serizawa, a role he reprised in the sequel, Godzilla: King of the Monsters. He lent his voice to the fourth and fifth installments of the Transformers franchise respectively, Transformers: Age of Extinction and Transformers: The Last Knight, as Decepticon-turned-Autobot Drift. In 2022, he starred in the HBO Max crime drama series Tokyo Vice.

He made his Broadway debut in April 2015 in Lincoln Center Theater's revival production of The King and I in the title role. In 2015, Watanabe received his first Tony Award nomination for Best Performance by a Leading Actor in a Musical at the 69th Tony Awards for his role as The King. He is the first Japanese actor to be nominated in this category. Watanabe reprised his role at the London Palladium in June 2018, earning a Laurence Olivier Award nomination.

== Early life ==
Watanabe was born on October 21, 1959, in the mountain village of Koide in Niigata Prefecture, Japan. His mother was a school teacher and his father taught calligraphy. Due to a number of relocations for his parents' work, he spent his childhood in the villages of Irihirose and Sumon, both now part of the city of Uonuma, and in Takada, now part of the city of Jōetsu. He attended Niigata Prefectural Koide High School, where he was a member of the concert band club, playing trumpet, which he had played since childhood.

After graduation from high school, in 1978 he aimed to enter Musashino Academia Musicae, a conservatory in Tokyo. However, he had never received a formal musical education, and his father became seriously ill when he was in junior high school and was unable to work, which meant that his family could no longer afford to pay for his music lessons. Because of these problems, Watanabe was forced to give up his intention of entering the conservatory. He said of the decision: "I had to give up my musical aspirations. I realised I had no talent as a musician. But I still wanted to find a way to be creative, so I decided to try acting".

== Career ==
=== Japanese roles ===
After graduating from high school in 1978, Watanabe moved to Tokyo to begin his acting career, by enrolling in the drama school run by the Engeki-Shudan En theatre troupe. While with the troupe, he was cast as the hero in the play Shimodani Mannencho Monogatari, directed by the acclaimed Yukio Ninagawa. The role attracted critical and popular notice.

In 1982, he made his first TV appearance in Michinaru Hanran (Unknown Rebellion), and his first appearance on TV as a samurai in Mibu no koiuta. He made his feature-film debut in 1984 with MacArthur's Children.

Watanabe is mostly known in Japan for playing samurai, as in the 1987 Dokuganryu Masamune (One eyed dragon, Masamune) the 50-episode NHK taiga drama. He played the lead character, Matsudaira Kurō, in the television jidaigeki Gokenin Zankurō, which ran for several seasons. He has gone on to garner acclaim in such historical dramas as Oda Nobunaga, Chūshingura, and the movie Bakumatsu Junjo Den.

In 1989, while filming Haruki Kadokawa's Heaven and Earth, Watanabe was diagnosed with acute myelogenous leukemia. He returned to acting while simultaneously undergoing chemotherapy treatments, but in 1991 suffered a relapse.

As his health improved his career picked back up. He co-starred with Kōji Yakusho in the 1998 Kizuna, for which he was nominated for the Japan Academy Film Prize for Best Supporting Actor.

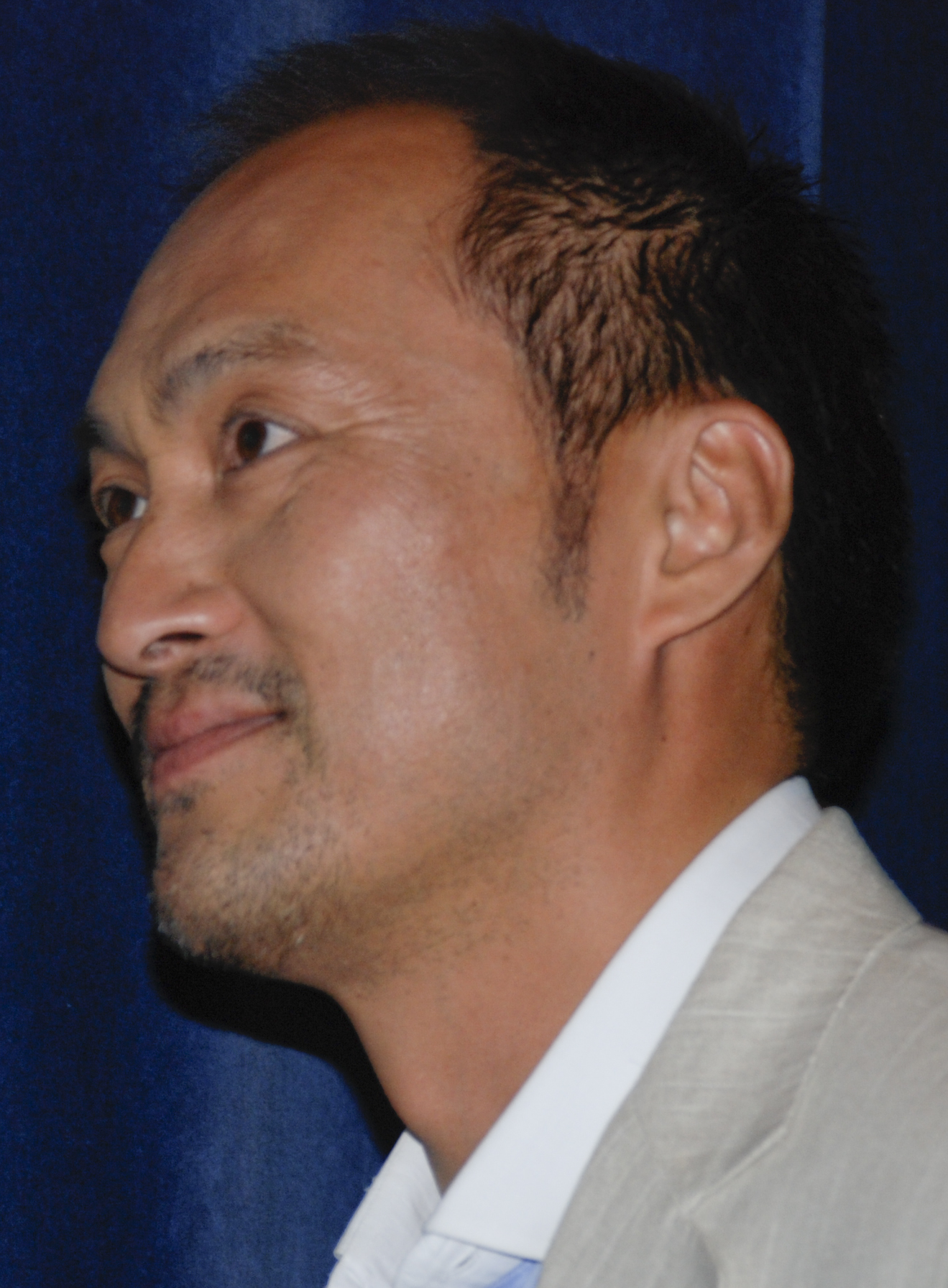
Watanabe at the NYC opening of Memories of Tomorrow

In 2002, he quit the 'En' theatre group where he had his start and joined the K Dash agency. The film Sennen no Koi (Thousand-year Love, based on The Tale of Genji) earned him another Japanese Academy Award nomination.

In 2006, he won Best Lead Actor at the 30th Japan Academy Film Prize for his role in Memories of Tomorrow (Ashita no Kioku), in which he played a patient with Alzheimer's disease.

=== International films ===
Watanabe was introduced to most Western audiences in the 2003 American film The Last Samurai, set in 19th Century Japan. His performance as Lord Katsumoto earned him an Academy Award nomination for Best Supporting Actor.

Watanabe appeared in the 2005 film Memoirs of a Geisha, playing Chairman Iwamura. That same year, he also played the decoy of Ra's al Ghul in Christopher Nolan's Batman film reboot, Batman Begins. In 2006, he starred in Clint Eastwood's Letters from Iwo Jima, playing Tadamichi Kuribayashi. He has voiced Ra's al Ghul in the Batman Begins video game. He has filmed advertisements for American Express, Yakult, Canon and NTT Docomo. In 2004, he was featured in People Magazine's 50 Most Beautiful People edition.

In 2009, he appeared in The Vampire's Assistant. In 2010, he co-starred in Inception, where he stars as Saito, a mark-turned-benefactor businessman of the film's heist team.

In 2014, he starred in two Hollywood blockbusters Godzilla and Transformers: Age of Extinction. In 2019, he starred in two other Hollywood blockbusters Pokémon Detective Pikachu and Godzilla: King of the Monsters.

In 2023, he returned to work with director Gareth Edwards again in the science fiction action film The Creator.

=== Television ===
Watanabe appears in Tokyo Vice, a television series based on the non-fiction book by Jake Adelstein and written for television by J.T. Rogers. The 18-part series was produced by HBO Max and is distributed by HBO Max and in Japan by Wowow. Tokyo Vice stars Ansel Elgort as Adelstein, an American journalist who embeds himself into the Tokyo Vice police squad to expose corruption. Watanabe is currently starring in the NHK World Japan's comedy You're a Genius!.

In April 2019, it was announced that Warner Bros. International Television Production and TV Asahi were teaming up to remake The Fugitive (1993). Watanabe starred in the remake, taking place in Tokyo just before the opening of the 2020 Tokyo Olympics. The 2–part special, called Tobosha, aired as part of the 60th anniversary celebration of the station, on December 5 and 6, 2020.

=== Streaming ===
Watanabe, event Ambassador, together with Kazunari Ninomiya, special supporter, was chosen for the Netflix coverage of the 2026 World Baseball Classic which started on March 5, 2026. The pair, in addition to the commentaries on the event, on January 30 released a video on the official Netflix YouTube. They also appeared in the documentary "Diamond Truth: The truth about the World Baseball Classic", released as a 4-parter, with the first two episodes streaming on February 19, and the remaining on February 27.

=== Other ===
Watanabe opened in 2013 a café in Kesennuma as a way to contribute with the reconstruction of the area after the 2011 Tōhoku earthquake and tsunami. The cafe, called K-port, was popular among locals and visitors. Watanabe personally served patrons around every two months. The café was closed in 2025, with Watanabe citing his age as the reason.

== Personal life ==
In 1983, Watanabe married his first wife, Yumiko. The couple had two children, a son, Dai Watanabe (born 1984), who is an actor, and a daughter Anne Watanabe (born 1986) who is an actress and fashion model. In September 2005, following two years of arbitration, he and Yumiko were divorced. In August 2008, Dai had his first child, a son, making Ken a grandfather at the age of 48. A daughter was born to Dai in March 2010. In May 2016, Watanabe's daughter gave birth to twin girls. In November 2017, she gave birth to a son, giving Watanabe five grandchildren altogether.

He met his second wife, Kaho Minami, when they were both acting in a suspense drama for TV Tokyo. They married on 3 December 2005. The marriage was announced by their agencies on 7 December, just after they had attended a New York City premiere of his film Memoirs of a Geisha together.

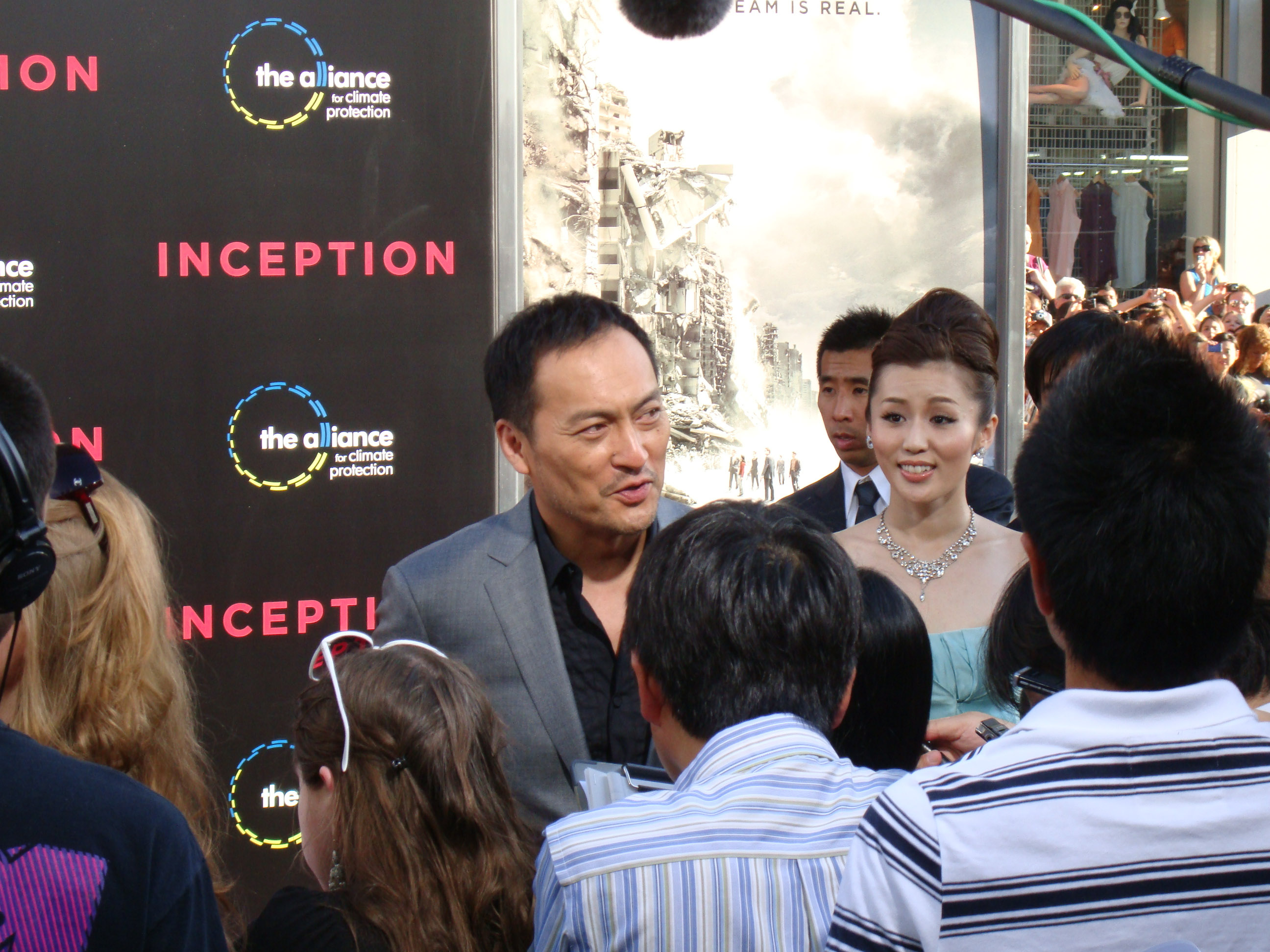
Watanabe at the premiere of Inception in July 2010

Watanabe formally adopted Minami's son from her previous marriage to director Jinsei Tsuji, and for a time the three of them lived in Los Angeles. In order to increase the amount of time the family could spend together, considering Ken's work requiring him to travel so much, they later returned to Japan. Initially Minami and Ken did not hold a wedding ceremony, but in 2010 they announced that they had held a ceremony on August 1 in Los Angeles.

On May 17, 2018, Minami's agency announced that she and Watanabe had divorced after he had admitted to having an extramarital affair.

In June 2023, Watanabe married for the third time, reportedly to a woman who is 21 years his junior, after dating for over 9 years.

=== Philanthropy ===
On March 13, 2011, he launched a YouTube page to raise awareness about the 2011 Tōhoku earthquake and tsunami and the subsequent Fukushima nuclear disaster and invited celebrities to add their videos of the triple tragedy in Japan. In his video in English, he made a call to action to support the victims of triple disaster and to raise funds in the relief effort. In conjunction amidst the Fukushima crisis, he has also created his own website for the cause.

=== Health ===
In 1989, Watanabe was diagnosed with acute myeloid leukemia. The cancer returned in 1994, but he later recovered.

In 2006, Watanabe revealed in his autobiography Dare? - Who Am I? that prior to commencing work on The Last Samurai, it was discovered that he had contracted hepatitis C from a blood transfusion he received while undergoing treatment for his leukemia. At a press conference held on May 23, 2006, he said he was in "good" condition but was still undergoing treatment.

In 2016, while on a break from performing in a Broadway production of The King and I, Watanabe was diagnosed with stomach cancer. He subsequently announced on February 9, 2016, that he would postpone scheduled performances in order to undergo the necessary treatment. Due to the early diagnosis, surgery was successfully able to remove the cancer.

== Acting credits ==
=== Films ===
Year	Title	Role	Notes	Ref.
1984	MacArthur's Children	Tetsuo Nakai		
1985	Kekkon Annai Mystery	Funayama Tetsuya / Masakazu Sekine		
1985	Tampopo	Gun		
1986	The Sea and Poison	Toda		
1998	Welcome Back, Mr. McDonald	Raita Onuki, Truck Driver		
1998	Kizuna	Detective Sako Akio		
2000	Space Travelers	Sakamaki		
2001	Genji: A Thousand-Year Love	Fujiwara Michinaga / Fujiwara Nobutaka		
2002	Dawn of a New Day: The Man Behind VHS	Ōkubo		
2003	The Last Samurai	Katsumoto Moritsugu	Hollywood debut	
2003	T.R.Y.	Masanobu Azuma		
2005	Memoirs of a Geisha	Chairman Ken Iwamura		
2005	Batman Begins	Ra's al Ghul's Decoy		
2005	Year One in the North	Hideaki Komatsubara		
2006	Memories of Tomorrow	Masayuki Saeki		
2006	Letters from Iwo Jima	General Tadamichi Kuribayashi		
2009	The Unbroken	Hajime Onchi		
2009	Cirque du Freak: The Vampire's Assistant	Mr. Hibernius Tall		
2010	Shanghai	Captain Tanaka		
2010	Inception	Mr. Saito		
2012	Hayabusa: The Long Voyage Home	Professor Yamaguchi Junichiro		
2013	Unforgiven	Jubei Kamata		
2014	Godzilla	Dr. Ishiro Serizawa		
2014	Transformers: Age of Extinction	Drift (voice)		
2015	Sea of Trees	Takumi Nakamura		
2016	Rage	Yōhei Maki		
2017	Transformers: The Last Knight	Drift (voice)		
2018	Isle of Dogs	Head Surgeon (voice)		
2018	The Samurai of Tsushima	The Emperor of Japan (voice)		
2018	Bel Canto	Katsumi Hosokawa		
2019	Detective Pikachu	Lt. Hide Yoshida		
2019	Godzilla: King of the Monsters	Dr. Ishiro Serizawa		
2020	Fukushima 50	Masao Yoshida		
2023	Kensuke's Kingdom	Kensuke (voice)		
2023	The Creator	Harun		
2025	Kokuho	Hanai Hanjiro		
2025	The Final Piece	Shigeyoshi Tōmyō		
2026	Samurai Vengeance	Shinoda Kinji		
2027	Hara o Kukutte			

=== Television ===
Year	Title	Role	Notes	Ref.
1983	Taiyō ni Hoero!	Yūji Shimizu	Episode 574	
1984	Sanga Moyu	Takeshi Kusuda	Taiga drama	
1986	Hanekonma	Genzō Onodera	Asadora	
1987	Dokuganryū Masamune	Date Masamune	Taiga drama	
1989	Oda Nobunaga	Oda Nobunaga	Television film	
1990–1992	Baian the Assassin	Baian Fujieda		
1991	Takeda Shingen	Narrator	Television film	
1993–1994	Homura Tatsu	Fujiwara no Tsunekiyo / Fujiwara no Yasuhira	Taiga drama	
1995–2002	Gokenin Zankurō	Zankurō Matsudaira		
2000	Ikebukuro West Gate Park	Inspector Yokoyama		
2001	Chūshingura 1/47		Cameo; television film	
2001	Hōjō Tokimune	Hōjō Tokiyori	Taiga drama	
2004	Vessel of Sand	Shūichirō Imanishi		
2009–2011	Clouds Over the Hill	Narrator	Taiga special drama	
2012	Makete, Katsu	Shigeru Yoshida	Mini-series	
2018	Segodon	Shimazu Nariakira	Taiga drama	
2019	An Artist of the Floating World	Masuji Ono	Television film	
2020	The Fugitive	Kazuki Kakurai	Mini-series	
2022–2024	Tokyo Vice	Hiroto Katagiri	Also executive producer	
2024	All Lives	Sho Naruse	Television film	
2025	Unbound	Tanuma Okitsugu	Taiga drama	
2025	Alice in Borderland	The Watchman	Season 3; episode 6	

=== Video games ===
Year	Title	Role	Notes	Ref.
2005	Batman Begins	Ra's al Ghul's decoy		

=== Stage ===
- Britannicus henso(1980)
- Britannicus henso (1980)
- Shitaya mannencho monogatari (1981)
- Fuyu no raion (The Lion in Winter) (1981)
- Pajaze (1981)
- Platonof (1982)
- Kafun netsu (1982)
- Pizarro (1985)
- Hamlet (1988)
- Hamlet no gakuya -anten (2000)
- Towa part1-kanojo (2000)
- Towa part2-kanojo to kare (2001)
- Dialogue with Horowitz (2013)
- The King and I (2015)
- The King and I (2016)
- The King and I (2018)
- The Royal Hunt of the Sun (2020)

=== Dubbing ===
Live-action

Year	Title	Role	Voice dub for	Notes	Ref.
1985	First Blood	John Rambo	Sylvester Stallone	NTV edition	
2019	Detective Pikachu	Lt. Hide Yoshida	Himself		

Animation

Year	Title	Role	Notes	Ref.
2024	Mufasa: The Lion King	Kiros		

== Awards and nominations ==
Year	Organization	Award	Work(s)	Result	Ref.
1987	11th Elan d'or Awards	Newcomer Award	Himself	Won	
1999	22nd Japan Academy Film Prize	Best Supporting Actor	Kizuna	Nominated	
2002	25th Japan Academy Film Prize	Best Supporting Actor	Genji: A Thousand-Year Love	Nominated	
2003	26th Japan Academy Film Prize	Best Supporting Actor	Dawn of a New Day: The Man Behind VHS	Nominated	
2003	2nd Washington D.C. Area Film Critics Association Awards	Best Supporting Actor	The Last Samurai	Nominated	
2004	76th Academy Awards	Best Supporting Actor	The Last Samurai	Nominated	
2004	30th Saturn Awards	Best Supporting Actor	The Last Samurai	Nominated	
2004	46th Blue Ribbon Awards	Special Award	The Last Samurai	Won	
2004	9th Critics' Choice Awards	Best Supporting Actor	The Last Samurai	Nominated	
2004	61st Golden Globe Awards	Best Supporting Actor	The Last Samurai	Nominated	
2004	8th Golden Satellite Awards	Best Supporting Actor	The Last Samurai	Nominated	
2004	10th Screen Actors Guild Awards	Best Supporting Actor	The Last Samurai	Nominated	
2006	31st Hochi Film Awards	Best Actor	Memories of Tomorrow	Won	
2006	19th Nikkan Sports Film Awards	Best Actor	Memories of Tomorrow	Won	
2007	49th Blue Ribbon Awards	Best Actor	Memories of Tomorrow	Won	
2007	30th Japan Academy Film Prize	Best Actor	Memories of Tomorrow	Won	
2007	26th Fujimoto Award	Special Prize	Memories of Tomorrow	Won	
2007	80th Kinema Junpo Awards	Best Actor	Memories of Tomorrow	Won	
2009	34th Hochi Film Awards	Best Actor	The Unbroken	Won	
2010	33rd Japan Academy Film Prize	Best Actor	The Unbroken	Won	
2014	37th Japan Academy Film Prize	Best Actor	Unforgiven	Nominated	
2015	69th Tony Awards	Best Actor in a Musical	The King and I	Nominated	
2016	58th Annual Grammy Awards	Best Musical Theater Album	The King and I	Nominated	
2019	2019 Laurence Olivier Awards	Best Actor in a Musical	The King and I	Nominated	
2021	44th Japan Academy Film Prize	Best Supporting Actor	Fukushima 50	Won	
2026	68th Blue Ribbon Awards	Best Supporting Actor	Kokuho	Nominated	
2026	49th Japan Academy Film Prize	Best Supporting Actor	Kokuho	Nominated	

== See also ==
- List of Academy Award winners and nominees from Japan
- List of Academy Award winners and nominees of Asian descent
- List of actors with Academy Award nominations
