= Nakayama Tunnel (Niigata Prefecture) =

Nakayama Tunnel (Japanese: 中山隧道, Hepburn: Nakayama zuidō) is unused tunnel on National Route 291 in Niigata, Japan. It is located at between Naganuma and Uonuma. Its length is 922 m and this is longest hand‐cut tunnel in Japan.

It made in between 1933 and 1949 by residents in Komatsukura settlement (小松倉地区, Komatsukura chiku), old Yamakoshi Village. In 1998, new tunnel for vehicles was opened and old tunnel have been preserved as historic site. It is known that construction of new tunnel was involved with Kakuei Tanaka.

There is a documentary film named "Horumaika Tebori Nakayama-Zuido no Kiroku (掘るまいか 手掘り中山隧道の記録)" directed by Shinichi Hashimoto. It is designated on Civil Engineering Heritage Sites Selection by Japan Society of Civil Engineers in 2006.

== Construction ==
Komatsukura settlement, Yamakoshi Village is surrounded by mountains and its residents have to go to Koide Town through Hirokami Village where cross from Nakayama Pass (中山峠, Nakayama touge) in order to go shopping or to hospital until 1949. It usually took more than an hour to cross Nakayama Pass. In the winter, it was hard to pass since snow fall is in excess of 4 m and sometimes there are snowstorm.

The residents discussed and decided to build a tunnel in 1932. The construction began from November 12, 1932. The residents had dug it by human power using pickaxes without hope the future. Pacific War had stopped this construction for almost four years giving priority the war and it restarted in 1947.

In 1949, pasting more than fifteen years from starting construction, the tunnel was opened to the opposite side. It made the resident's living environment improved. Nakayama Pass can be now passed by 20 minutes even if snow fall.

== After constitutions ==
Its width is 1.4 m and height is 1.5 at that time. Its widening work have done many times and it designated as route of National Route 219 in 1982. After the designation, new Nakayama Tunnel (中山トンネル, Nakayama ton'nel) was open in 1998 in part of National Route improvement undertaking and old Nakayama Tunnel ended a function as community road from 1949.
