= Uonuma =

Uonuma 魚沼市
- City
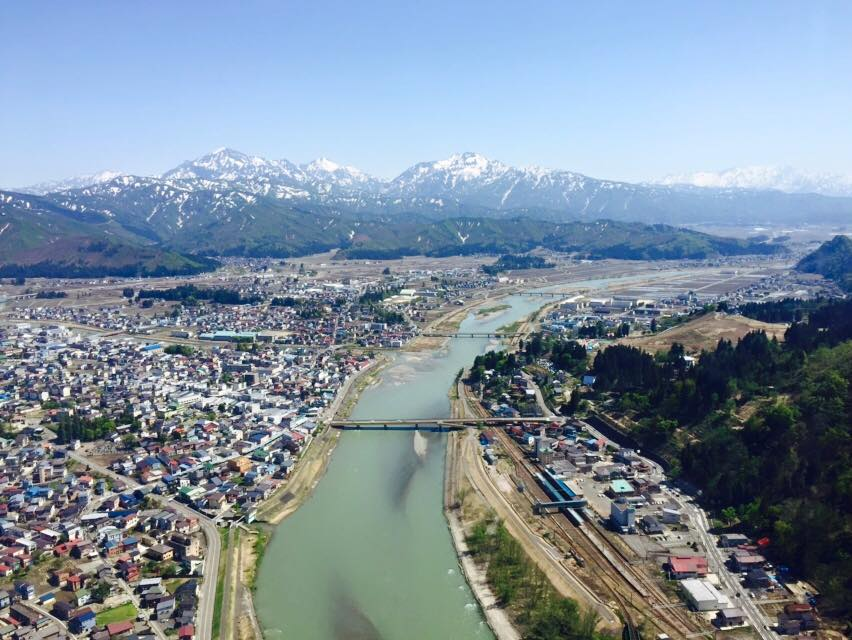
- View of Uonuma

- Flag Seal

- Location of Uonuma in Niigata

- Coordinates: 37°13′48.4″N 138°57′41.3″E
- Country: Japan
- Region: Chūbu (Kōshin'etsu) (Hokuriku)
- Prefecture: Niigata

Government
  - Mayor: Mikio Uchida (From December 2020)

Area
  - Total: 946.76 km^{2} (365.55 sq mi)
- Elevation: 95 m (312 ft)

Population (July 1, 2019)
  - Total: 35,027
  - Density: 36.997/km^{2} (95.821/sq mi)
- Time zone: UTC+9 (Japan Standard Time)
- Phone number: 025-792-1000
- Address: 130-1 Koidejima, Uonuma-shi, Niigata-ken 946-8601
- Climate: Cfa
- Website: Official website
- Symbols
- Bird: Japanese bush-warbler
- Fish: Ayu
- Flower: Erythronium japonicum
- Tree: Magnolia kobus

Yellow: 6 areas/sections in Uonuma City (Koide, Horinouchi, Yunotani, Hirokami, Sumon and Irihirose)

Uonuma (魚沼市, Uonuma-shi; Japanese pronunciation: [ɯ̈̀.ó̞.nɨ́.mä́(.ɕì)]) is a city located in Niigata Prefecture, Japan. As of 1 July 2019, the city had an estimated population of 35,027 in 13,289 households, and a population density of 37 persons per km^{2}. Its total area is 946.76 square kilometres (365.55 sq mi). The city is famous for its koshihikari rice, which commands a premium in the Japanese market.

== Geography ==
Uonuma is located in an inland region of south-central Niigata Prefecture, bordered by Fukushima Prefecture to the east and Gunma Prefecture to the south. Parts of the city are within the borders of Oze National Park or the Echigo Sanzan-Tadami Quasi-National Park

=== Surrounding municipalities ===
- Gunma Prefecture
  - Katashina
  - Minakami
- Fukushima Prefecture
  - Hinoemata
  - Tadami
- Niigata Prefecture
  - Minamiuonuma
  - Nagaoka
  - Ojiya
  - Sanjō
  - Tōkamachi

== Climate ==
Uonuma has a humid subtropical climate (Köppen Cfa) characterized by warm, wet summers and cold winters with heavy snowfall. The average annual temperature in Uonuma is 12.6 °C. The average annual rainfall is 2049 mm with September as the wettest month. The temperatures are highest on average in August, at around 25.0 °C, and lowest in January, at around 0.4 °C.

Climate data for Koide, Uonuma (elevation 98 m, 1991–2020 normals, extremes 1978–present)
Month	Jan	Feb	Mar	Apr	May	Jun	Jul	Aug	Sep	Oct	Nov	Dec	Year
Record high °C (°F)	16.7 (62.1)	18.1 (64.6)	22.9 (73.2)	30.9 (87.6)	33.7 (92.7)	36.9 (98.4)	38.4 (101.1)	39.0 (102.2)	38.1 (100.6)	34.8 (94.6)	27.2 (81.0)	21.1 (70.0)	39.0 (102.2)
Mean daily maximum °C (°F)	3.3 (37.9)	4.3 (39.7)	8.3 (46.9)	16.2 (61.2)	23.1 (73.6)	26.4 (79.5)	29.8 (85.6)	31.7 (89.1)	27.0 (80.6)	20.6 (69.1)	13.6 (56.5)	6.5 (43.7)	17.6 (63.7)
Daily mean °C (°F)	0.3 (32.5)	0.5 (32.9)	3.2 (37.8)	9.2 (48.6)	16.3 (61.3)	20.7 (69.3)	24.5 (76.1)	25.7 (78.3)	21.4 (70.5)	14.9 (58.8)	8.3 (46.9)	2.8 (37.0)	12.3 (54.1)
Mean daily minimum °C (°F)	−2.3 (27.9)	−2.7 (27.1)	−0.8 (30.6)	3.6 (38.5)	10.4 (50.7)	16.2 (61.2)	20.5 (68.9)	21.4 (70.5)	17.2 (63.0)	10.7 (51.3)	4.2 (39.6)	−0.1 (31.8)	8.2 (46.8)
Record low °C (°F)	−13.7 (7.3)	−13.9 (7.0)	−11.7 (10.9)	−4.7 (23.5)	1.8 (35.2)	7.9 (46.2)	13.0 (55.4)	12.5 (54.5)	6.3 (43.3)	−0.1 (31.8)	−5.7 (21.7)	−12.4 (9.7)	−13.9 (7.0)
Average precipitation mm (inches)	369.3 (14.54)	248.9 (9.80)	187.0 (7.36)	123.5 (4.86)	117.1 (4.61)	158.6 (6.24)	269.8 (10.62)	178.3 (7.02)	162.3 (6.39)	182.7 (7.19)	247.7 (9.75)	389.9 (15.35)	2,635.1 (103.74)
Average snowfall cm (inches)	327 (129)	264 (104)	126 (50)	21 (8.3)	0 (0)	0 (0)	0 (0)	0 (0)	0 (0)	0 (0)	5 (2.0)	164 (65)	900 (354)
Average precipitation days (≥ 1.0 mm)	25.6	21.5	20.1	14.3	11.9	13.4	15.2	12.0	13.6	15.4	18.9	23.5	205.2
Mean monthly sunshine hours	37.9	57.8	93.7	151.3	187.0	143.5	138.8	183.0	133.9	127.5	97.0	54.3	1,405.6
Source: Japan Meteorological Agency (1991–2020 normals, extremes 1978–present)

Climate data for Sumon, Uonuma (elevation 222 m, 1991–2020 normals, extremes 1978–present)
Month	Jan	Feb	Mar	Apr	May	Jun	Jul	Aug	Sep	Oct	Nov	Dec	Year
Record high °C (°F)	12.9 (55.2)	15.5 (59.9)	21.4 (70.5)	29.9 (85.8)	32.8 (91.0)	35.3 (95.5)	37.2 (99.0)	37.4 (99.3)	36.8 (98.2)	33.6 (92.5)	26.0 (78.8)	22.2 (72.0)	37.4 (99.3)
Mean daily maximum °C (°F)	2.6 (36.7)	3.5 (38.3)	7.2 (45.0)	14.5 (58.1)	21.9 (71.4)	25.1 (77.2)	28.4 (83.1)	30.2 (86.4)	25.8 (78.4)	19.5 (67.1)	12.7 (54.9)	5.6 (42.1)	16.4 (61.5)
Daily mean °C (°F)	−0.4 (31.3)	−0.2 (31.6)	2.3 (36.1)	7.7 (45.9)	14.9 (58.8)	19.4 (66.9)	23.3 (73.9)	24.4 (75.9)	20.2 (68.4)	13.9 (57.0)	7.4 (45.3)	2.0 (35.6)	11.3 (52.3)
Mean daily minimum °C (°F)	−3.0 (26.6)	−3.4 (25.9)	−1.5 (29.3)	2.4 (36.3)	8.6 (47.5)	14.5 (58.1)	19.2 (66.6)	20.1 (68.2)	16.0 (60.8)	9.6 (49.3)	3.3 (37.9)	−0.8 (30.6)	7.1 (44.8)
Record low °C (°F)	−12.1 (10.2)	−13.2 (8.2)	−10.2 (13.6)	−4.7 (23.5)	0.1 (32.2)	5.0 (41.0)	10.2 (50.4)	11.2 (52.2)	5.5 (41.9)	−0.3 (31.5)	−6.3 (20.7)	−10.1 (13.8)	−13.2 (8.2)
Average precipitation mm (inches)	446.0 (17.56)	295.0 (11.61)	222.4 (8.76)	141.5 (5.57)	125.5 (4.94)	169.7 (6.68)	311.0 (12.24)	213.2 (8.39)	181.8 (7.16)	198.6 (7.82)	318.2 (12.53)	470.9 (18.54)	3,105.4 (122.26)
Average snowfall cm (inches)	398 (157)	302 (119)	182 (72)	60 (24)	4 (1.6)	0 (0)	0 (0)	0 (0)	0 (0)	0 (0)	23 (9.1)	259 (102)	1,243 (489)
Average precipitation days (≥ 1.0 mm)	26.4	22.3	21.0	14.4	12.4	13.4	16.0	12.9	14.5	15.6	19.9	24.6	212.6
Mean monthly sunshine hours	31.3	49.4	83.2	140.5	182.3	141.2	134.1	179.4	134.8	120.7	88.3	44.7	1,336.4
Source: Japan Meteorological Agency (1991–2020 normals, extremes 1978–present)

== Demographics ==
Per Japanese census data, the population of Uonuma has declined over the past 50 years.

Historical population
Year	Pop.	±%
1970	49,689	—
1980	48,482	−2.4%
1990	47,394	−2.2%
2000	45,386	−4.2%
2010	40,361	−11.1%
2020	34,483	−14.6%

== History ==
The area of present-day Uonuma was part of ancient Echigo Province, with the name of Uonuma appearing in the Shoku Nihongi in an entry dated 702 AD. During the Edo period, the area was largely tenryō territory administered directly by the Tokugawa shogunate or part of the holdings of Aizu Domain. The area was greatly affected by the Tenpō famine of 1835–1837. After the Meiji restoration, the area was organised as part of Kitauonuma District, Niigata with the creation of the modern municipalities system. The modern city of Uonuma was established on November 1, 2004, from the merger of the towns of Horinouchi and Koide, and the villages of Hirokami, Irihirose, Sumon and Yunotani (all from Kitauonuma District).

== Government ==
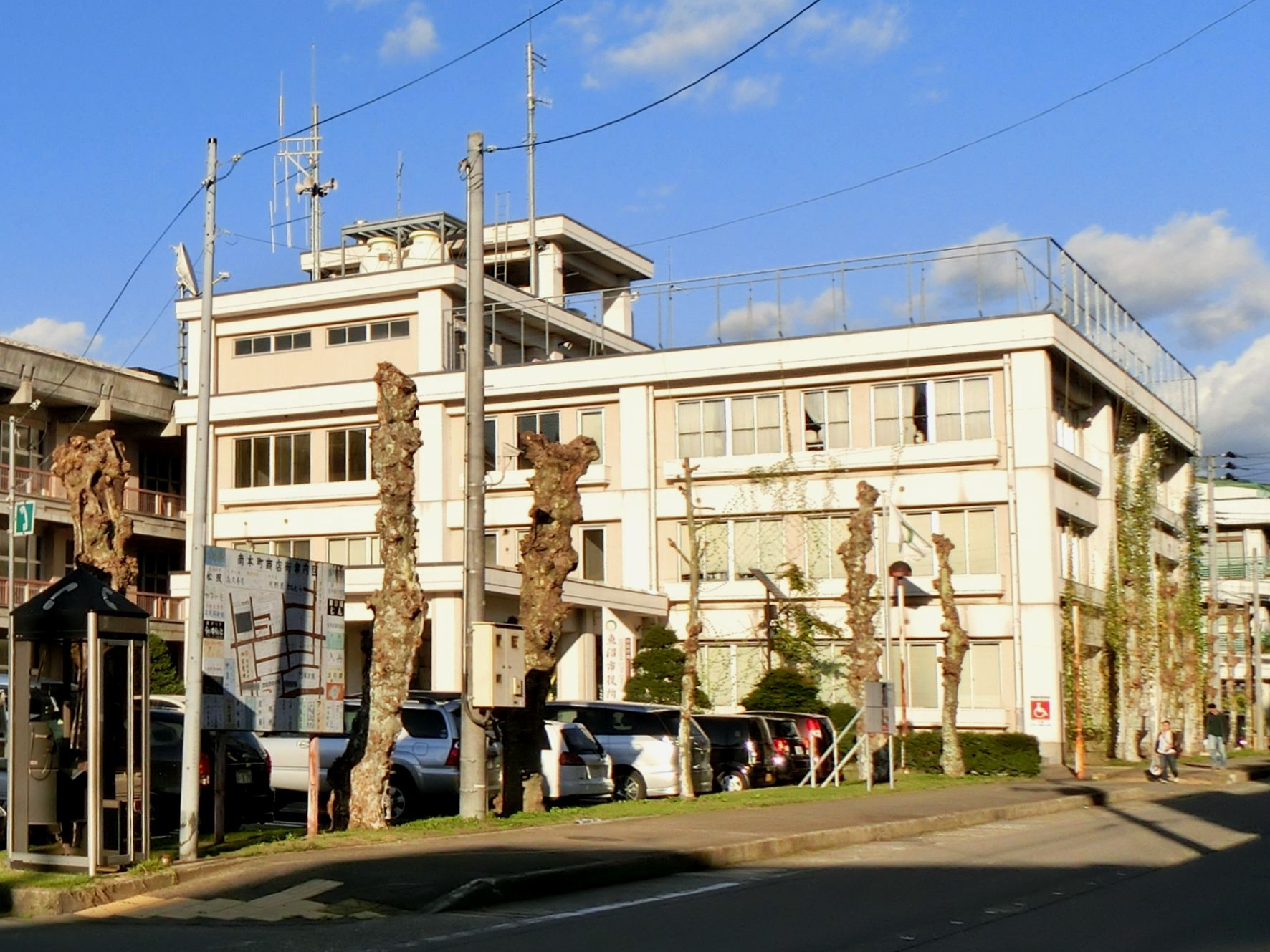
Uonuma City Hall

Uonuma has a mayor-council form of government with a directly elected mayor and a unicameral city legislature of 20 members.

== Economy ==
The economy of Uonuma is dominated by agriculture, predominantly rice production, along with sake brewing.

== Education ==
Uonuma has nine public elementary schools and six public middle schools operated by the city government. The city has two public high schools operated by the Niigata Prefectural Board of Education, and also two special education schools.

== Transportation ==
=== Railway ===
- JR East - Jōetsu Line
  - Koide - Echigo-Horinouchi - Kita-Horinouchi
- JR East - Tadami Line
  - Ōshirakawa - ~~Kakinoki~~ - Irihirose - Kamijō - Echigo-Suhara - Uonuma-Tanaka - Echigo-Hirose - Yabukami - Koide

=== Highway ===
- Kan-Etsu Expressway
- National Route 17
- National Route 252
- National Route 289
- National Route 290
- National Route 291
- National Route 352

== Local attractions ==
=== Places of interest ===
- Okutadami Dam/ Okutadami lake (Official name: Kanayama lake)
- Ginzandaira (Ueda Ginzan/ Shiramine Ginzan)
- Eirin temple. Eirin and Saifuku temple hold beautiful sculptures from the Japanese Michelangelo, Uncho Ishikawa, dating from the end of the Edo Era. Both temples have been designated cultural assets by Niigata prefecture
- Saifuku temple
- Former House of Meguro family · Sato family (Important cultural assets of the country)
- Ikeno Tōge - Ikeno Tōge and Kagamigaike are so close that there is a road station on the shores of Kagamigaike Pond.
- Kagamigaike - Neighboring Irihirose road station.
- Oze - It is one of the entrances of Niigata prefecture.
- Miya Hīragi Memorial Hall - Uonuma City Hall Adjacent to Horinouchi Government Office
- Hibikino no Mori Park - adjoining Koide Township Cultural Center
- Echigo Golf Club - Opened in September 1992 according to the third sector system by local governments (Niigata prefecture and former Hiroshima village) and 11 private companies based on the Okutadami Recreation Area Development Project in Niigata Prefecture. It applied for the civil rehabilitation law on January 13, 2006, and has effectively broken down, but it started again.
- Stars' house - Astronomical observation facility located at the summit of Suhara ski resort. There is a celestial observation dome equipped with a 400 mm reflective telescope.
- Nakayama Tunnel (1949 - 1998)
- Shimizu Kawabe Shrine
- Hayatsu Gallery
- Echigo Herbal Garden Irihirose
- General Park Koide Park
- General Park Tsukioka Park
- Hirokami Nature Park
- Horinouchi Yana field
- Hirokami yana place
- Asakusa Sanroku Ecology Museum
- Noyama no Kō House of documents
- Yunotani cultural exchange center Yubio
- The village of Kamiyu and the surroundings
- National Residence Asakusa Sanso
- Small Shirosawa Hut · Oku Ginzan Campground
Uonogawa, the river flowing through Uonuma

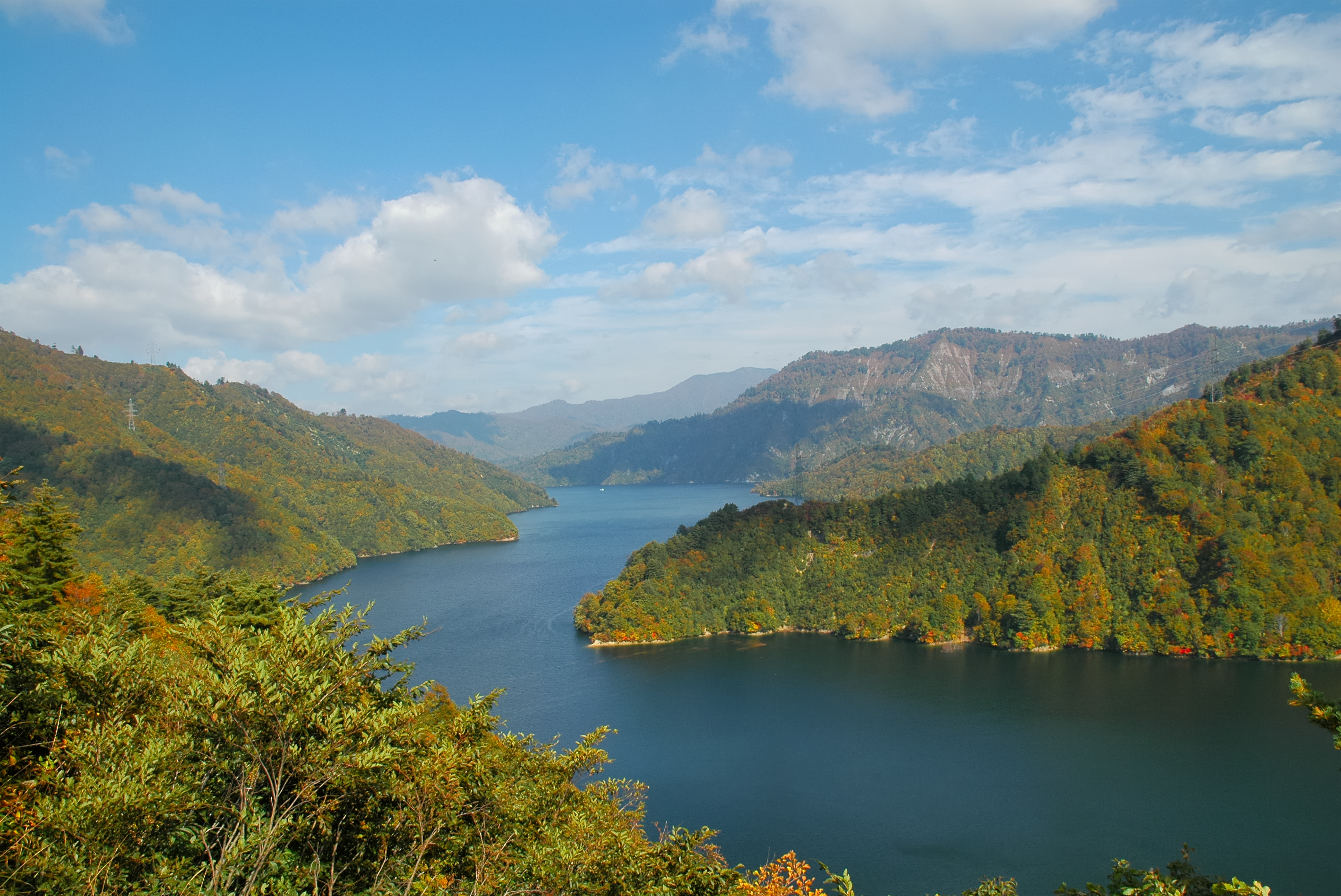
Okutadami Lake, an artificial lake where many fishermen come to catch the delicious species living here

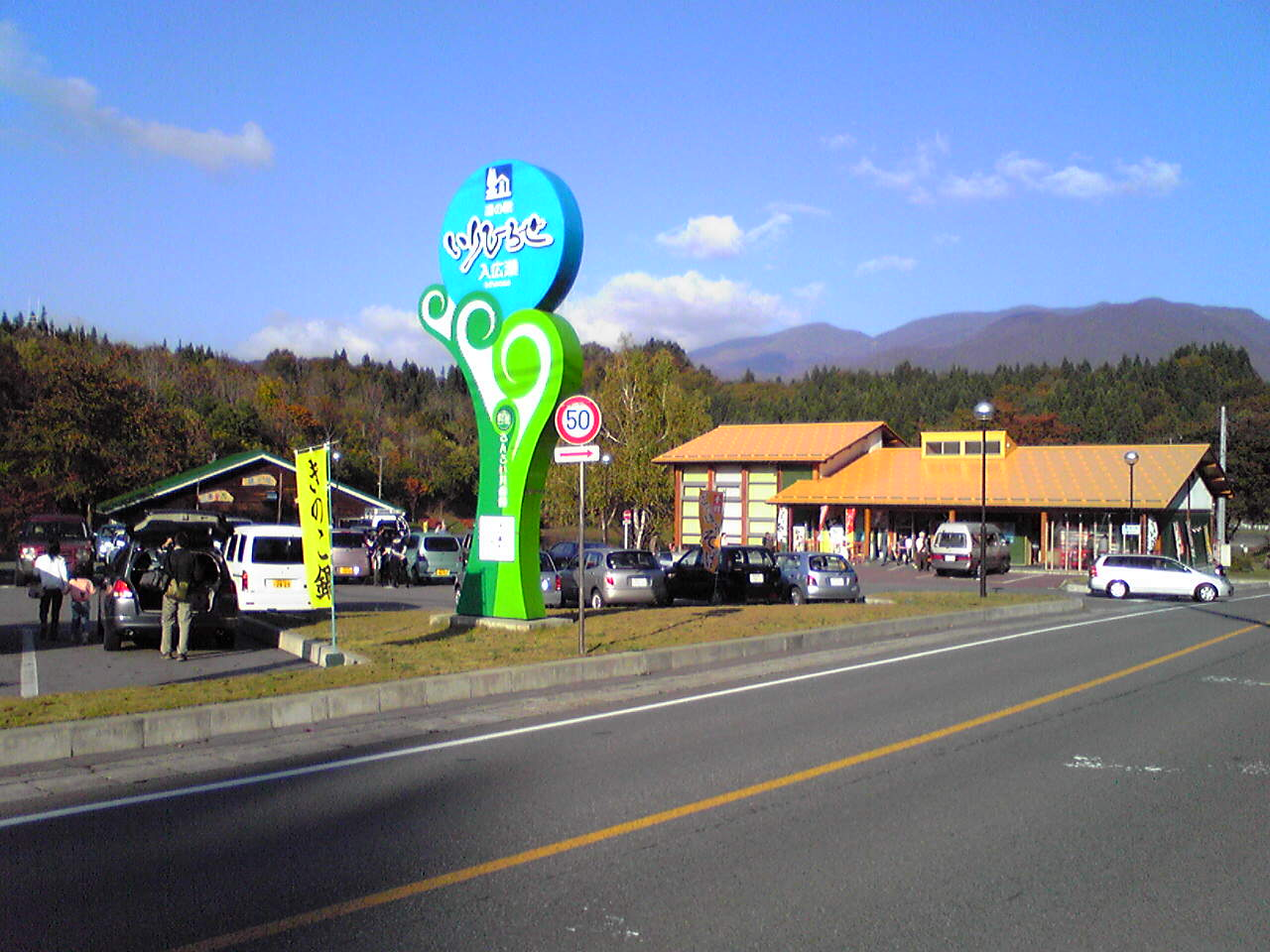
Irihirose, roadside station.

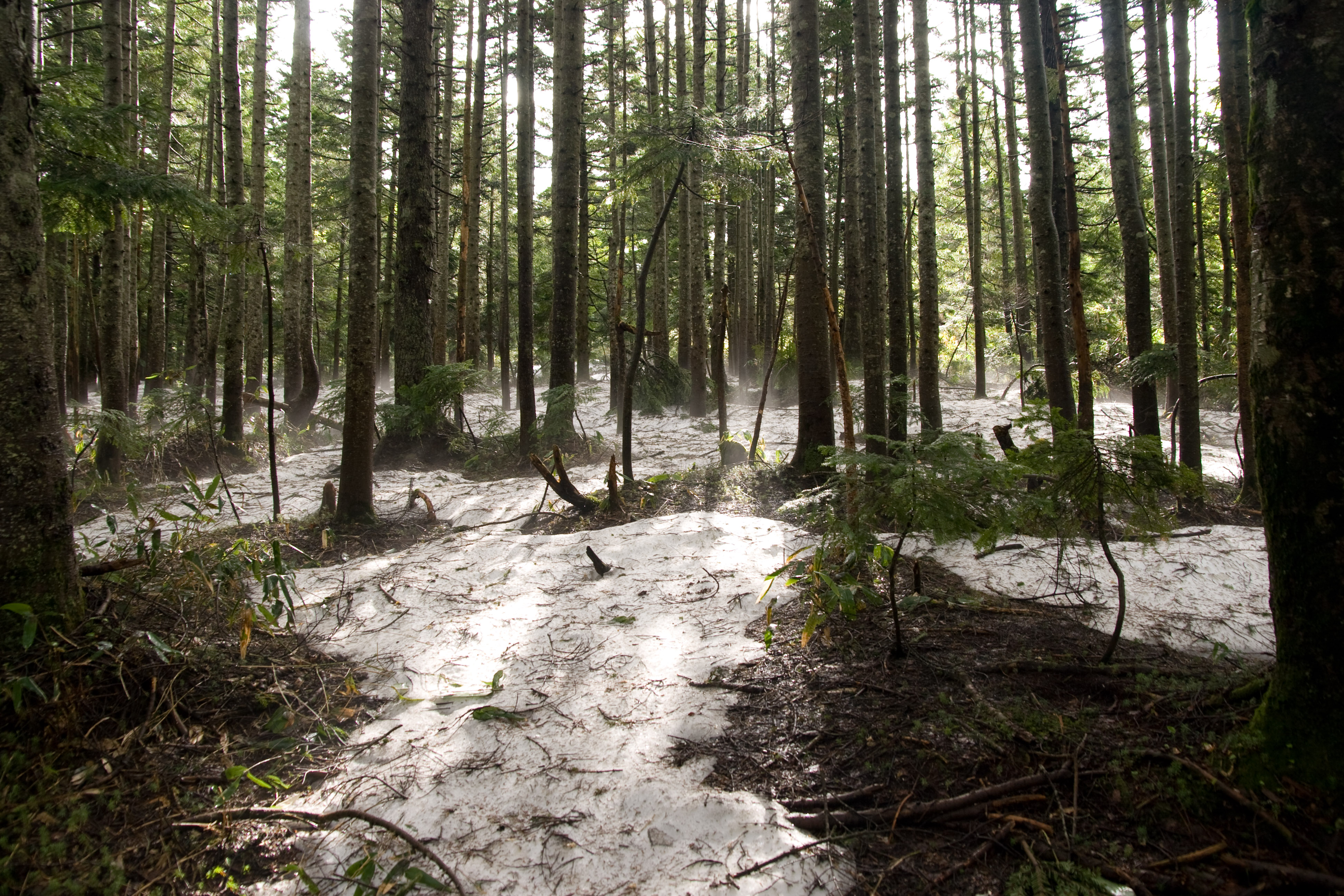
A view from the forest in Oze natural park, Uonuma

=== Onsen ===
- Yunotani Onsen village
- Ginzantaira Onsen, Hot Springs from the snowfalls
- Toshikazu Onsen, New Asakusadake Onsen
- Kusushi Onsen
- Nakanosawa Onsen - Hanekawa manor
- Sumon Onsen Seiun house
- Komami viewing Onsen

=== Ski resorts ===
- Koide ski resort
- Yunotani Yakushi Ski Resort
- Ōyu hot spring ski resort
- Okutadami Maruyama Ski Resort
- Suhara ski area
- Ohara ski resort

In addition to this, the Echigo Axiom ski resort (Formerly named Gongendō ski resort) in the old SUmon village, Nakame Ski resort in the former Ichirose village was open but both have been closed.

=== Festivals and events ===
Aerial video of Uonuma Moss Phlox Festival

- Dai no Ban Bon Odori Osaka (Horinouchi area designated as an important intangible folk cultural property on December 16, 1998)
- Shineri Benten Tataki Jizo Festival (Kojima district June 30 every year), where as a guy you can pinch the women in a special place. If they reply by a tap on your shoulder, you will have good fortune this year!
- Ushi no kakutsuki no Shuuzoku: (However designated important intangible folk cultural property by Dai Imogawa area On 22 May 1978, it is nowadays suspended because it involved bull fights)
- Uonuma "Fureai Summer Snow Festival" (Ginzandaira District, every Last Friday and Sunday of July)
- Koide festival (Koide area every August from 25th to 27th)
- Horinouchi Juugoya Matsuri, where the full moon is celebrated (Horinouchi area, every second weekend of September: Friday, Saturday, Sunday. It was formerly held from September 14 to 16)
- Uonuma city international snowball brawl
- Snow Flower Water Festival (Horinouchi Area February 11 of every year)
  - At the same time, 'Hatto Festival' will be held.
- Sumeragi Ōichi (Horinouchi area, on every first Sunday of May to October)
- Oze Saburo Chuunagon Kuyō Matsuri
- Yunosato snow festival "108 Lights" - first Sunday of March every year
- Torioi: Procession held at New Year's (January 14 every year)
- God of the age (January 15 every year)
- Shioritōge Hill Climb in Yunotani

=== Traditional crafts ===
Osawa Washi: Traditional Japanese paper (former Yunotani village)

== Notable people from Uonuma ==
- Sato Anju, Former Member of NGT48
- Ken Watanabe, actor in many Japanese and American productions.
- Ryuichi Yoneyama, Governor of Niigata Prefecture
