= Hirokami, Niigata =

Hirokami 広神村
- Former municipality
- Flag Emblem
- Interactive map of Hirokami
- Country: Japan
- Region: Hokuriku
- Prefecture: Niigata Prefecture
- District: Kitauonuma District
- Merged: November 1, 2004 (now part of Uonuma)

Area
  - Total: 105.64 km^{2} (40.79 sq mi)

Population (2003)
  - Total: 8,892
- Time zone: UTC+09:00 (JST)

6 former municipalities merged to create the new Uonuma City

Hirokami (広神村, Hirokami-mura) was a village located in Kitauonuma District, Niigata Prefecture, Japan.

As of 2003, the village had an estimated population of 8,892 and a density of 84.17 persons per km^{2}. The total area was 105.64 km^{2}.

On November 1, 2004, Hirokami, along with the towns of Horinouchi and Koide, and the villages of Irihirose, Sumon and Yunotani (all from Kitauonuma District), was merged to create the city of Uonuma.

== Transportation ==
=== Railway ===
JR East - Tadami Line

- Uonuma-Tanaka - Echigo-Hirose - Yabukami

=== Highway ===
- National Route 252
- National Route 291
- National Route 352

== See also ==
- Uonuma
