= Kitauonuma District, Niigata =

Former district in Niigata prefecture, Japan

Coordinates: 37.436472°N 138.838861°E

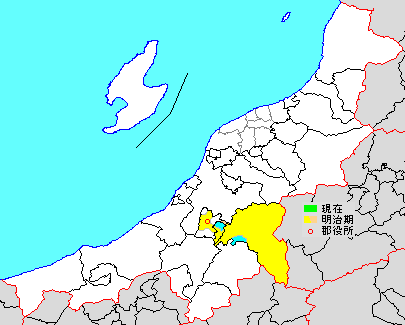
Map showing original extent of Kitauonuma District in Niigata Prefecture: * yellow - areas formerly within the district borders during the early Meiji period

Kitauonuma (北魚沼郡, Kitauonuma-gun) was a district located in Niigata Prefecture, Japan.

As of 2003, the district had an estimated population of 5,549 with a density of 110.91 persons per km^{2}. The total area was 357.29 km^{2}.

== Towns and villages ==
Prior to its dissolution on 3 March 2010, the district consisted of only one village:

- Kawaguchi (Note: Classified as a village.)

== History ==
- On 1954 - The areas now covering Ojiya were merged and elevated to city status.

=== Recent mergers ===
- On November 1, 2004 - The towns of Horinouchi and Koide, and the villages of Hirokami, Irihirose, Sumon and Yunotani were merged to form the city of Uonuma.
- On March 31, 2010 - The town of Kawaguchi was merged into the expanded city of Nagaoka. Therefore, Kitauonuma District was dissolved as the result of this merger.

== See also ==
- List of dissolved districts of Japan
