= Sumon, Niigata =

Sumon 守門村
- Former municipality
- Flag Seal
- Interactive map of Sumon
- Country: Japan
- Region: Hokuriku
- Prefecture: Niigata Prefecture
- District: Kitauonuma District
- Merged: November 1, 2004 (now part of Uonuma)

Area
  - Total: 120.03 km^{2} (46.34 sq mi)

Population (2003)
  - Total: 4,663
- Time zone: UTC+09:00 (JST)

6 former municipalities merged to create the new Uonuma City

Sumon (守門村, Sumon-mura) was a village located in Kitauonuma District, Niigata Prefecture, Japan.

As of 2003, the village had an estimated population of 4,663 and a density of 38.85 persons per km^{2}. The total area was 120.03 km^{2}.

On November 1, 2004, Sumon, along with the towns of Horinouchi and Koide, and the villages of Hirokami, Irihirose and Yunotani (all from Kitauonuma District), was merged to create the city of Uonuma.

== Transportation ==
=== Railway ===
JR East - Tadami Line

- Kamijō - Echigo-Suhara

=== Highway ===
- National Route 252
- National Route 290

== See also ==
- Uonuma
