= Kawaguchi, Niigata =

Coordinates: 37°16′N 138°52′E

Kawaguchi 川口町
- Former municipality
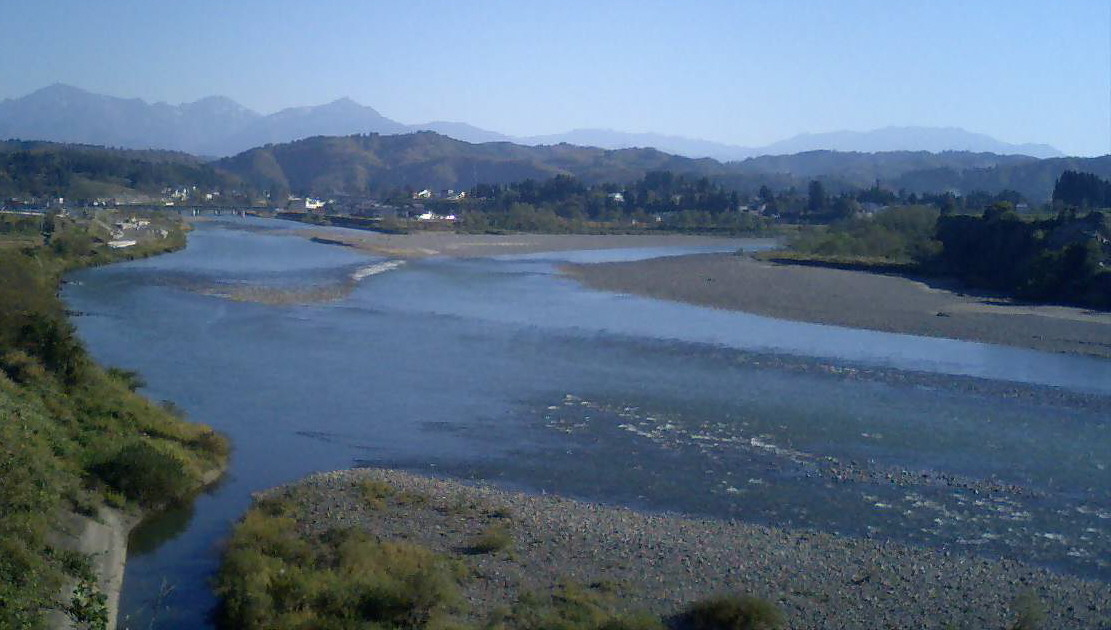
- Shinano River and Uono River

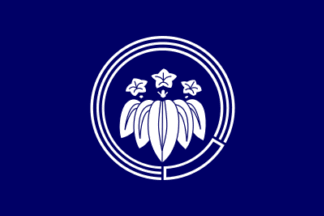
- Flag Emblem

- Location of Kawaguchi in Niigata Prefecture
- Country: Japan
- Region: Hokuriku
- Prefecture: Niigata Prefecture
- District: Kitauonuma District
- Merged: March 31, 2010 (now part of Nagaoka)

Area
  - Total: 50.03 km^{2} (19.32 sq mi)

Population (2010)
  - Total: 4,801
- Time zone: UTC+09:00 (JST)
- Symbols
- Flower: Phlox subulata
- Tree: Cherry blossom

10 municipalities merged into Nagaoka City

Kawaguchi (川口町, Kawaguchi-machi) was a town located in Kitauonuma District, Niigata Prefecture, Japan.

As of 2003, the town had an estimated population of 5,549 and a density of 110.91 persons per km^{2}. The total area was 50.03 km^{2}.

During the 2004 Chūetsu earthquake, Kawaguchi was the only town to report the maximum value of 7 on the Japan Meteorological Agency seismic intensity scale.

On March 31, 2010, Kawaguchi was merged into the expanded city of Nagaoka.

== Transportation ==
=== Railway ===
JR East - Jōetsu Line
- Echigo-Kawaguchi
JR East - Iiyama Line
- Echigo-Kawaguchi

=== Highway ===
- Kan-etsu Expressway – Echigo-Kawaguchi IC/SA
- National Route 17
- National Route 117

== See also ==
- 2004 Chūetsu earthquake
