= Koide, Niigata =

Koide 小出町
- Former municipality
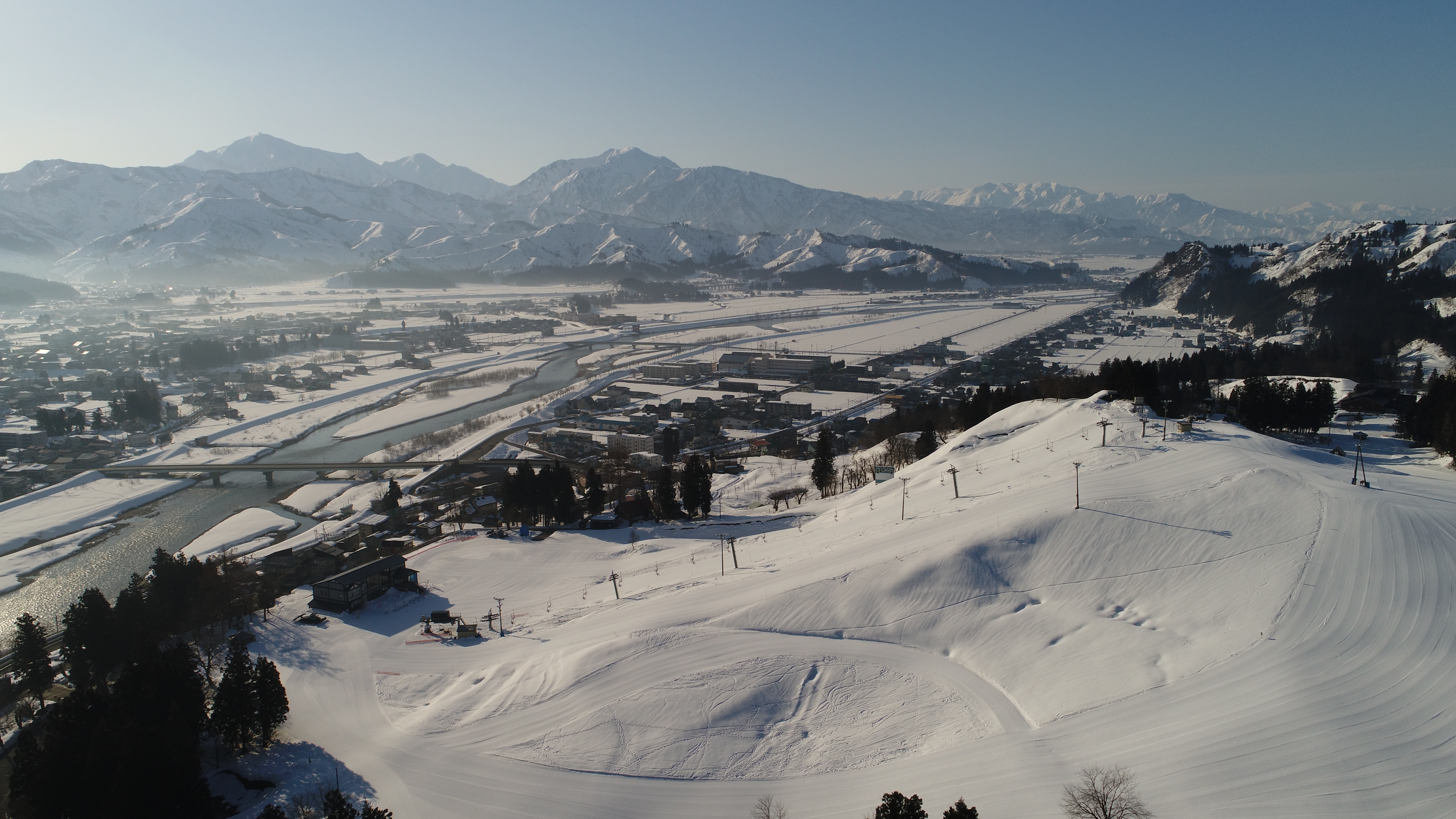
- Koide Skiing Ground

- Flag Emblem
- Interactive map of Koide
- Country: Japan
- Region: Hokuriku
- Prefecture: Niigata Prefecture
- District: Kitauonuma District
- Merged: November 1, 2004 (now part of Uonuma)

Area
  - Total: 30.04 km^{2} (11.60 sq mi)

Population (2003)
  - Total: 12,735
- Time zone: UTC+09:00 (JST)

6 former municipalities merged to create the new Uonuma City

Koide (小出町, Koide-machi) was a town located in Kitauonuma District, Niigata Prefecture, Japan. It is famous for its snowy ski resort.

As of 2003, the town had an estimated population of 12,735 and a density of 423.93 persons per km^{2}. The total area was 30.04 km^{2}.

On November 1, 2004, Koide, along with the town of Horinouchi, and the villages of Hirokami, Irihirose, Sumon and Yunotani (all from Kitauonuma District), was merged to create the city of Uonuma.

== Climate ==
Koide has a humid subtropical climate (Köppen Cfa) that borders on a humid continental climate, with four distinct seasons. Winters are cool and extremely snowy due to its location in a mountainous valley, while summers are hot and humid.

Climate data for Koide, Uonuma (elevation 98 m, 1991–2020 normals, extremes 1978–present)
Month	Jan	Feb	Mar	Apr	May	Jun	Jul	Aug	Sep	Oct	Nov	Dec	Year
Record high °C (°F)	16.7 (62.1)	18.1 (64.6)	22.9 (73.2)	30.9 (87.6)	33.7 (92.7)	36.9 (98.4)	38.4 (101.1)	39.0 (102.2)	38.1 (100.6)	34.8 (94.6)	27.2 (81.0)	21.1 (70.0)	39.0 (102.2)
Mean daily maximum °C (°F)	3.3 (37.9)	4.3 (39.7)	8.3 (46.9)	16.2 (61.2)	23.1 (73.6)	26.4 (79.5)	29.8 (85.6)	31.7 (89.1)	27.0 (80.6)	20.6 (69.1)	13.6 (56.5)	6.5 (43.7)	17.6 (63.7)
Daily mean °C (°F)	0.3 (32.5)	0.5 (32.9)	3.2 (37.8)	9.2 (48.6)	16.3 (61.3)	20.7 (69.3)	24.5 (76.1)	25.7 (78.3)	21.4 (70.5)	14.9 (58.8)	8.3 (46.9)	2.8 (37.0)	12.3 (54.1)
Mean daily minimum °C (°F)	−2.3 (27.9)	−2.7 (27.1)	−0.8 (30.6)	3.6 (38.5)	10.4 (50.7)	16.2 (61.2)	20.5 (68.9)	21.4 (70.5)	17.2 (63.0)	10.7 (51.3)	4.2 (39.6)	−0.1 (31.8)	8.2 (46.8)
Record low °C (°F)	−13.7 (7.3)	−13.9 (7.0)	−11.7 (10.9)	−4.7 (23.5)	1.8 (35.2)	7.9 (46.2)	13.0 (55.4)	12.5 (54.5)	6.3 (43.3)	−0.1 (31.8)	−5.7 (21.7)	−12.4 (9.7)	−13.9 (7.0)
Average precipitation mm (inches)	369.3 (14.54)	248.9 (9.80)	187.0 (7.36)	123.5 (4.86)	117.1 (4.61)	158.6 (6.24)	269.8 (10.62)	178.3 (7.02)	162.3 (6.39)	182.7 (7.19)	247.7 (9.75)	389.9 (15.35)	2,635.1 (103.74)
Average snowfall cm (inches)	327 (129)	264 (104)	126 (50)	21 (8.3)	0 (0)	0 (0)	0 (0)	0 (0)	0 (0)	0 (0)	5 (2.0)	164 (65)	900 (354)
Average precipitation days (≥ 1.0 mm)	25.6	21.5	20.1	14.3	11.9	13.4	15.2	12.0	13.6	15.4	18.9	23.5	205.2
Mean monthly sunshine hours	37.9	57.8	93.7	151.3	187.0	143.5	138.8	183.0	133.9	127.5	97.0	54.3	1,405.6
Source: Japan Meteorological Agency (1991–2020 normals, extremes 1978–present)

== Transportation ==
=== Railway ===
JR East - Jōetsu Line

- Koide

JR East - Tadami Line

- Koide

=== Highway ===
- National Route 17
- National Route 252
- National Route 291
- National Route 352

== Natives of Koide ==
- Ken Watanabe

== See also ==
- Uonuma
