= Yunotani, Niigata =

Yunotani 湯之谷村
- Former municipality
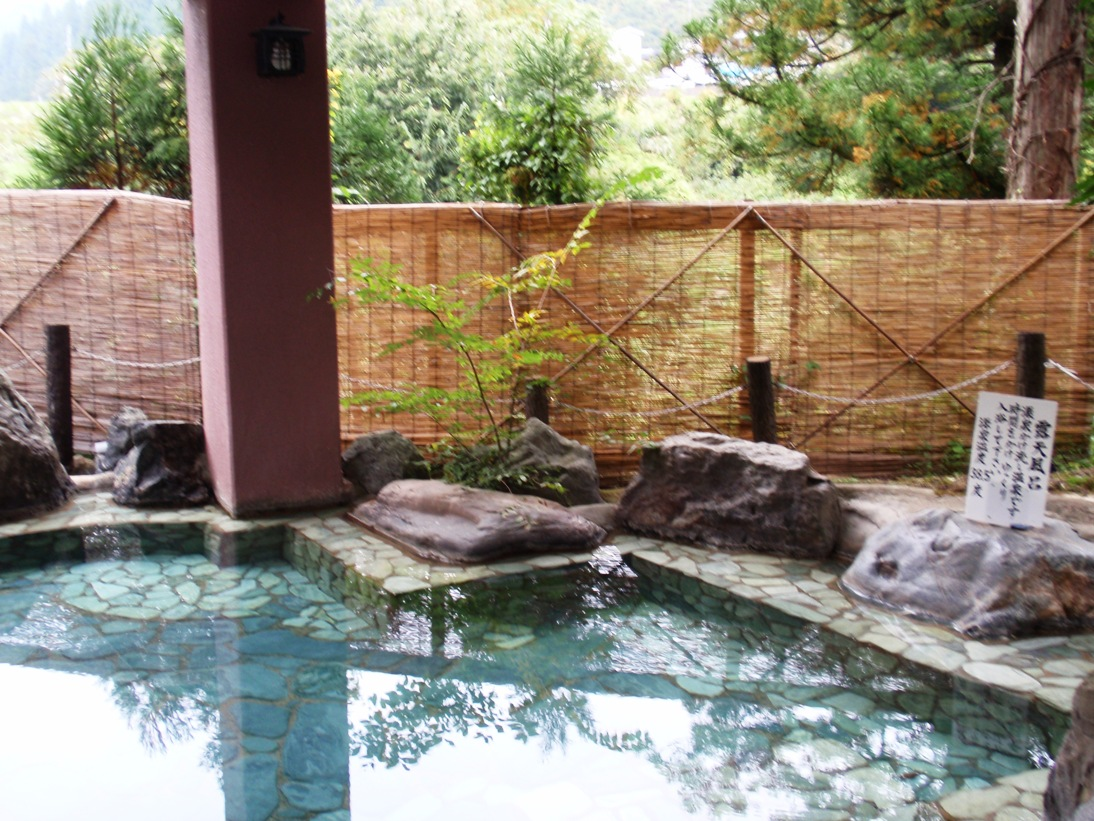
- Oritate Onsen

- Flag Seal
- Interactive map of Yunotani
- Country: Japan
- Region: Hokuriku
- Prefecture: Niigata Prefecture
- District: Kitauonuma District
- Merged: November 1, 2004 (now part of Uonuma)

Area
  - Total: 350.08 km^{2} (135.17 sq mi)

Population (2003)
  - Total: 6,433
- Time zone: UTC+09:00 (JST)

6 former municipalities merged to create the new Uonuma City

Yunotani (湯之谷村, Yunotani-mura) was a village located in Kitauonuma District, Niigata Prefecture, Japan.

As of 2003, the village had an estimated population of 6,433 and a density of 18.38 persons per km^{2}. The total area was 350.08 km^{2}.

On November 1, 2004, Yunotani, along with the towns of Horinouchi and Koide, and the villages of Hirokami, Irihirose and Sumon (all from Kitauonuma District), was merged to create the city of Uonuma.

== Transportation ==
=== Highway ===
- National Route 17
- National Route 352

== Local attractions ==
- Yunotani Onsen (ja:湯之谷温泉郷)
  - Imogawa Onsen, Oritate Onsen, Oyu Onsen, Tochiomata Onsen, etc.
- Okutadami Dam
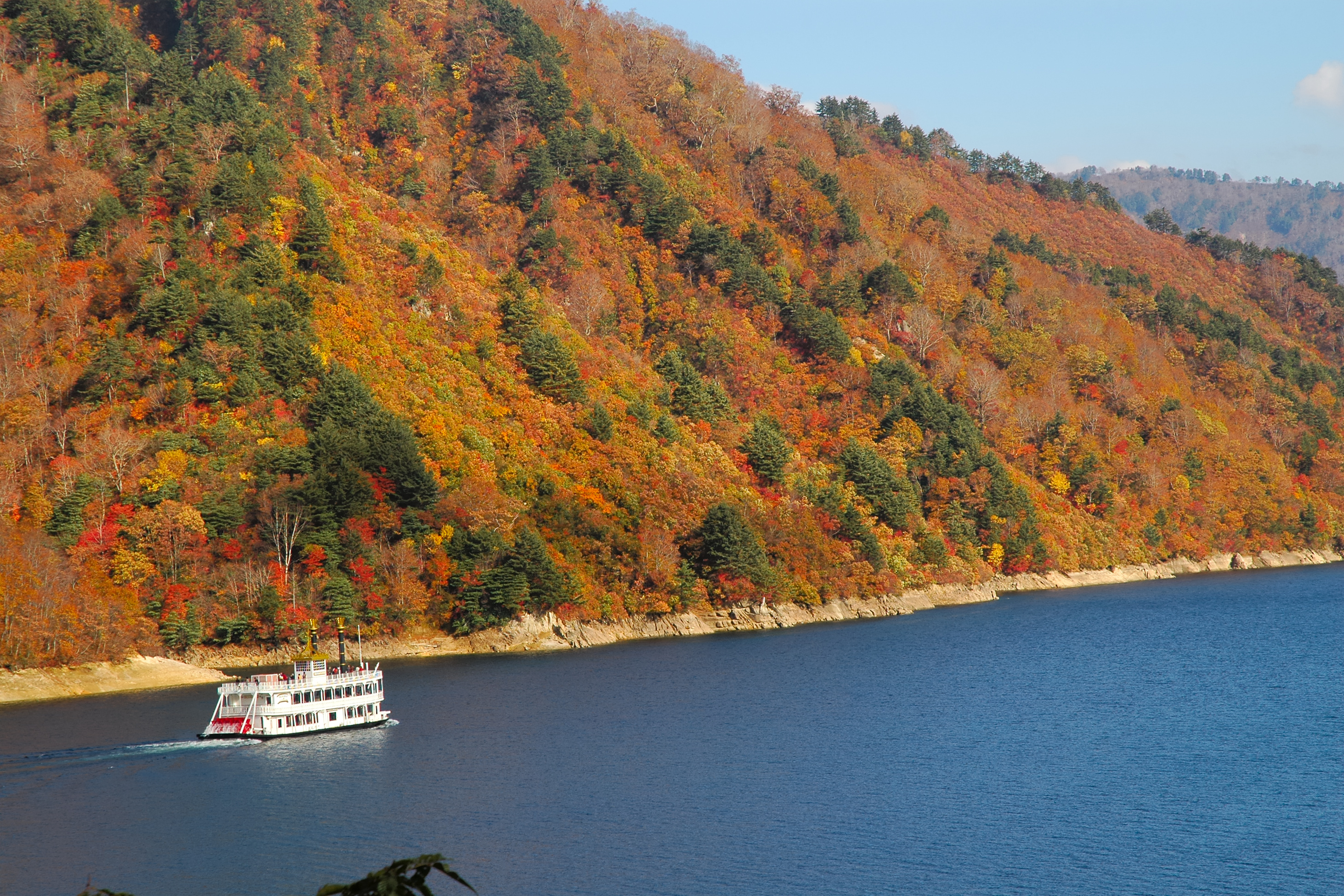
Okutadami Dam

== See also ==
- Uonuma
