= Yabukami Station =

Railway station in Uonuma, Niigata Prefecture, Japan

Coordinates: 37.2568°N 138.9757°E

Yabukami Station 藪神駅
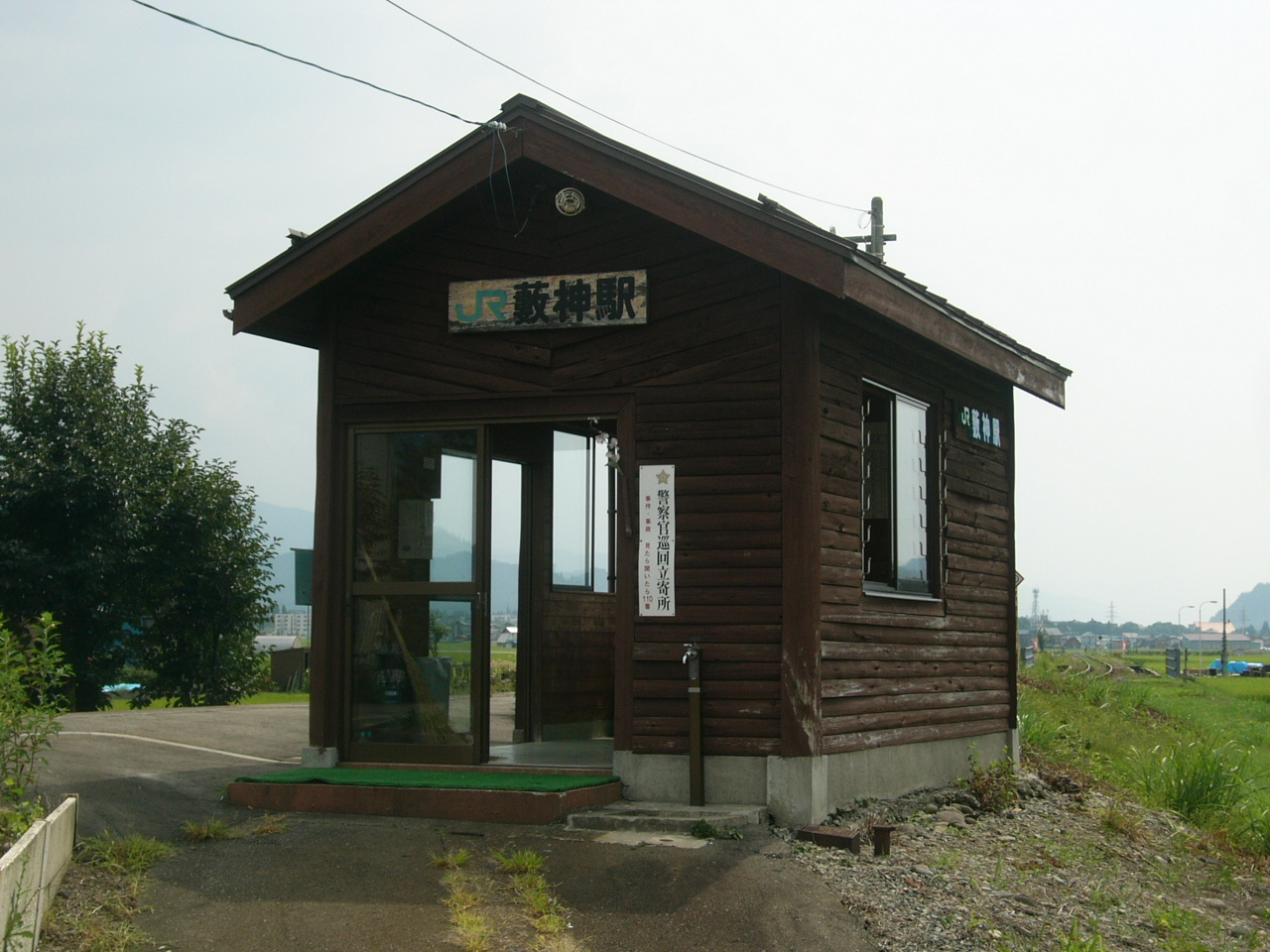
- Yabukami Station in August 2006

General information
- Location: Imaizumi, Uonuma-shi, Niigata-ken; Japan
- Operator: JR East
- Line: ■ Tadami Line
- Platforms: 1 side platform
- Tracks: 1

Other information
- Website: www.jreast.co.jp/estation/station/info.aspx?StationCd=1596

History
- Opened: 1 October 1951

Services
Preceding station	JR East	Following station
Koide Terminus	Tadami Line	Echigo-Hirose towards Aizu-Wakamatsu
Location
- Location within JR Tadami Line Location within Japan

Yabukami Station (藪神駅, Yabukami-eki) is a railway station in Uonuma, Niigata, Japan, operated by East Japan Railway Company (JR East).

== Lines ==
Yabukami Station is served by the Tadami Line, and is 131.6 kilometers from terminus of the line at Aizu-Wakamatsu.

== Station layout ==
The station consists of one ground-level side platform serving a single bi-directional track. The station is unattended.

== History ==
Yabukami Station opened by Japanese National Railways (JNR) on 1 October 1951, as an intermediate station on the initial western section of the Tadami Line between Koide and Ōshirakawa. The station was absorbed into the JR East network upon the privatization of the JNR on April 1, 1987.

== Surrounding area ==
- former Hirokami village hall
- Japan National Route 252
- Hirokami Middle School

== See also ==
- List of railway stations in Japan
