= Kamijō Station (Niigata) =

Railway station in Uonuma, Niigata Prefecture, Japan

Coordinates: 37.3468°N 139.0507°E

Kamijō Station 上条駅
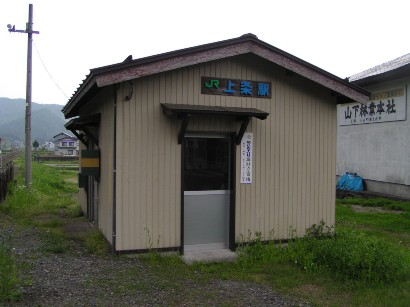
- Kamijō Station in May 2005

General information
- Location: Shibukawa, Uonuma-shi, Niigata-ken; Japan
- Operator: JR East
- Line: ■ Tadami Line
- Platforms: 1 side platform
- Tracks: 1

Other information
- Website: www.jreast.co.jp/estation/station/info.aspx?StationCd=489

History
- Opened: 1 October 1951

Services
| Preceding station | JR East | Following station |
|---|---|---|
| Echigo-Suhara towards Koide | Tadami Line | Irihirose towards Aizu-Wakamatsu |
Location
- Location within JR Tadami Line Location within Japan

Kamijō Station (上条駅, Kamijō-eki) is a railway station in Uonuma, Niigata, Japan, operated by East Japan Railway Company (JR East).

== Lines ==
Kamijō Station is served by the Tadami Line, and is 118.7 kilometers (73.8 miles) from terminus of the line at Aizu-Wakamatsu.

== Station layout ==
The station consists of one ground-level side platform serving a single bi-directional track. The station is unattended.

== History ==
Kamijō Station was opened by the Japanese National Railways (JNR) on 1 October 1951, as an intermediate station on the initial western section of the Tadami Line between Koide and Ōshirakawa. The station was absorbed into the JR East network upon the privatization of the JNR on April 1, 1987.

== Surrounding area ==
- Kamijō Post Office
- Sumon Onsen
- Kamijō Elementary School

== See also ==
- List of railway stations in Japan
