= Uonuma-Tanaka Station =

Railway station in Uonuma, Niigata Prefecture, Japan

Coordinates: 37.2944°N 138.9925°E

Uonuma-Tanaka Station 魚沼田中駅
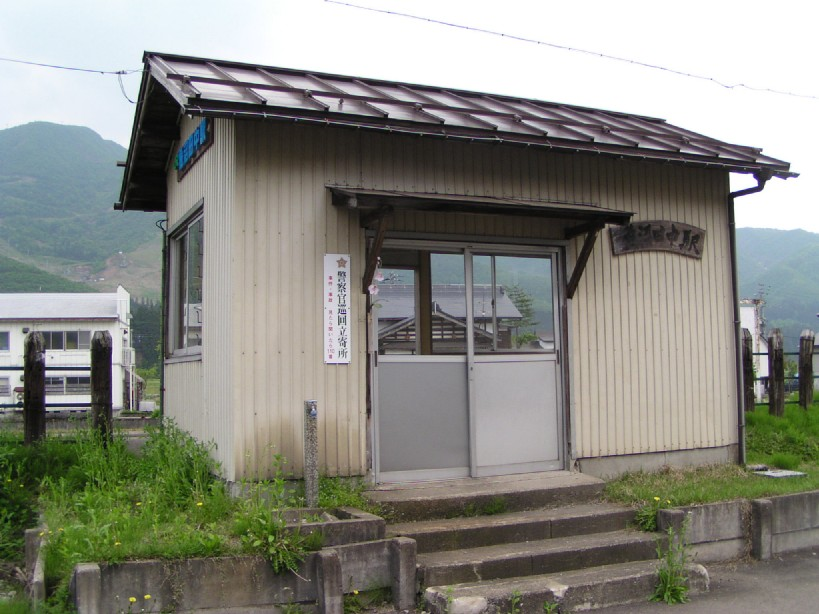
- Uonuma-Tanaka Station in May 2005

General information
- Location: Tanaka, Uonuma-shi, Niigata-ken; Japan
- Operator: JR East
- Line: ■ Tadami Line
- Platforms: 1 side platform
- Tracks: 1

Other information
- Website: www.jreast.co.jp/estation/station/info.aspx?StationCd=206

History
- Opened: 1 October 1951

Services
Preceding station	JR East	Following station
Echigo-Hirose towards Koide	Tadami Line	Echigo-Suhara towards Aizu-Wakamatsu
Location
- Location within JR Tadami Line Location within Japan

Uonuma-Tanaka Station (魚沼田中駅, Uonuma-Tanaka-eki) is a railway station in Uonuma, Niigata, Japan, operated by East Japan Railway Company (JR East).

== Lines ==
Uonuma-Tanaka Station is served by the Tadami Line, and is 127.0 kilometers from terminus of the line at Aizu-Wakamatsu.

== Station layout ==
The station consists of one ground-level side platform serving a single bi-directional track. The station is unattended.

== History ==
Uonuma-Tanaka Station was opened by the Japanese National Railways (JNR) on 1 October 1951, as an intermediate station on the initial western section of the Tadami Line between Koide and Ōshirakawa. The station was absorbed into the JR East network upon the privatization of the JNR on April 1, 1987.

== Surrounding area ==
- Uonuma-Tanaka Post Office
- Japan National Route 252

== See also ==
- List of railway stations in Japan
