= Horinouchi, Niigata =

Horinouchi 堀之内町
- Former municipality
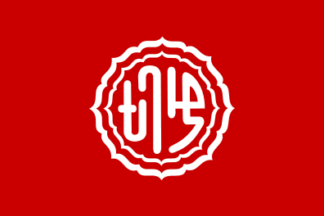
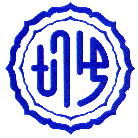
- Flag Emblem
- Interactive map of Horinouchi
- Country: Japan
- Region: Hokuriku
- Prefecture: Niigata Prefecture
- District: Kitauonuma District
- Merged: November 1, 2004 (now part of Uonuma)

Area
  - Total: 69.00 km^{2} (26.64 sq mi)

Population (2003)
  - Total: 9,403
- Time zone: UTC+09:00 (JST)

6 former municipalities merged to create the new Uonuma City

Horinouchi (堀之内町, Horinouchi-machi) was a town located in Kitauonuma District, Niigata Prefecture, Japan.

As of 2003, the town was estimated population of 9,403 and a density of 136.28 persons per km^{2}. The total area was 69.00 km^{2}.

On November 1, 2004, Horinouchi, along with the town of Koide, and the villages of Hirokami, Irihirose, Sumon and Yunotani (all from Kitauonuma District), was merged to create the city of Uonuma.

== Transportation ==
=== Railway ===
JR East - Jōetsu Line

- Echigo-Horinouchi - Kita-Horinouchi

=== Highway ===
- National Route 17
- National Route 252

== See also ==
- Uonuma
