= Echigo-Suhara Station =

Railway station in Uonuma, Niigata Prefecture, Japan

Coordinates: 37.3208°N 139.0175°E

Echigo-Suhara Station 越後須原駅
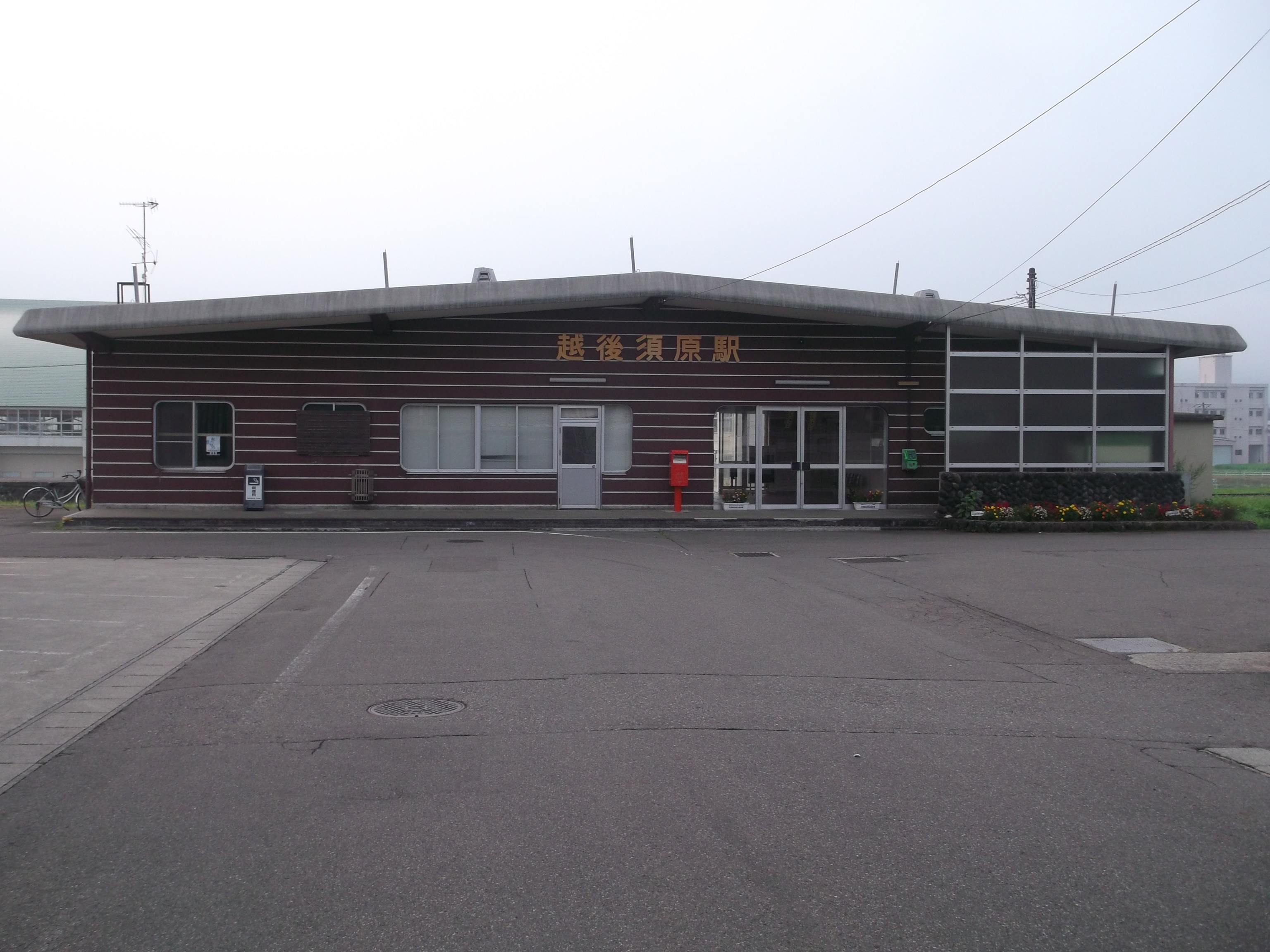
- Echigo-Suhara Station in August 2013

General information
- Location: 1419 Suhara, Uonuma-shi, Niigata-ken; Japan
- Operator: JR East
- Line: ■ Tadami Line
- Platforms: 1 side platform
- Tracks: 1

Other information
- Website: www.jreast.co.jp/estation/station/info.aspx?StationCd=274

History
- Opened: 1 November 1942

Services
Preceding station	JR East	Following station
Uonuma-Tanaka towards Koide	Tadami Line	Kamijō towards Aizu-Wakamatsu
Location
- Location within JR Tadami Line Location within Japan

Echigo-Suhara Station (越後須原駅, Echigo-Suhara-eki) is a railway station in Uonuma, Niigata, Japan, operated by East Japan Railway Company (JR East).

== Lines ==
Echigo-Suhara Station is served by the Tadami Line, and is 121.1 kilometers from terminus of the line at Aizu-Wakamatsu.

== Station layout ==
The station consists of one ground-level side platform serving a single bi-directional track. The station is unattended.

== History ==
Echigo-Suhara Station opened on 1 November 1942, as an intermediate station on the initial western section of the Tadami Line between Koide and Ōshirakawa. Along with the rest of the Tadami Line, the station came under the ownership of the Japanese National Railways (JNR) in 1949, and was absorbed into the JR East network upon the privatization of the JNR on April 1, 1987.

== Surrounding area ==
- former Sumon village hall
- Suhara Ski Resort
- Sumon Middle School
- Sumon Elementary School

== See also ==
- List of railway stations in Japan
