= Irihirose, Niigata =

Irihirose 入広瀬村
- Former municipality
- Flag Emblem
- Interactive map of Irihirose
- Country: Japan
- Region: Hokuriku
- Prefecture: Niigata Prefecture
- District: Kitauonuma District
- Merged: November 1, 2004 (now part of Uonuma)

Area
  - Total: 272.14 km^{2} (105.07 sq mi)

Population (2003)
  - Total: 1,907
- Time zone: UTC+09:00 (JST)

6 former municipalities merged to create the new Uonuma City

Irihirose (入広瀬村, Irihirose-mura) was a village located in Kitauonuma District, Niigata Prefecture, Japan.

As of 2003, the village had an estimated population of 1,907 and a density of 7.01 persons per km^{2}. The total area was 272.14 km^{2}.

On November 1, 2004, Irihirose, along with the towns of Horinouchi and Koide, and the villages of Hirokami, Sumon and Yunotani (all from Kitauonuma District), was merged to create the city of Uonuma.

== Transportation ==
=== Railway ===
JR East - Tadami Line

- Ōshirakawa - Kakinoki - Irihirose

=== Highway ===
- National Route 252

== See also ==
- Uonuma
