= Japan National Route 352 =

National highway in Japan

National Route 352
- 国道352号
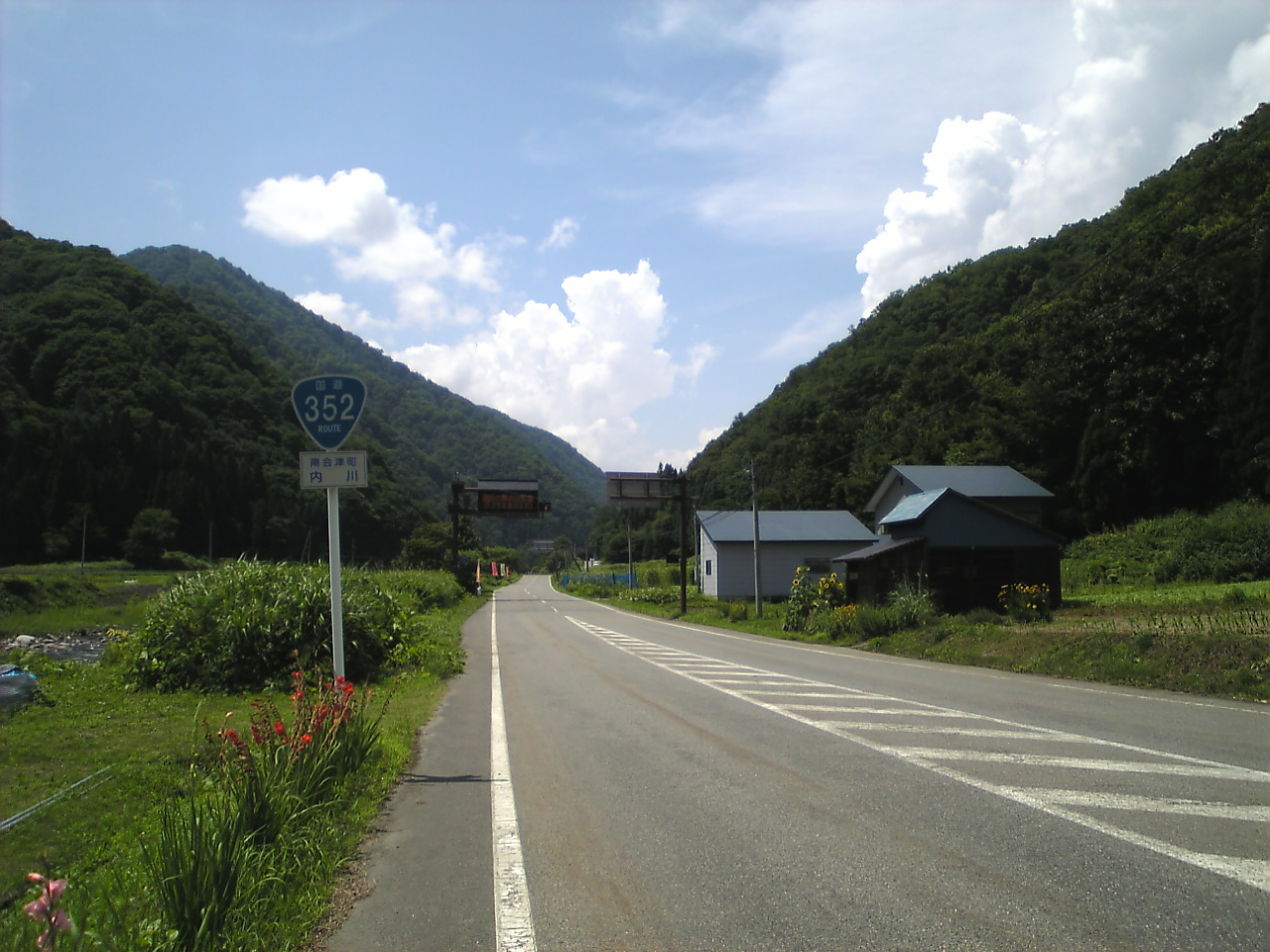

Route information
- Length: 329 km (204 mi)

Location
- Country: Japan

Highway system
- National highways of Japan; Expressways of Japan
← National Route 351	→ National Route 353

National Route 352 is a national highway of Japan connecting Kashiwazaki, Niigata and Kaminokawa, Tochigi in Japan, with a total length of 329 km (204.43 mi).

== Route description ==
A section of National Route 352 in the city of Uonuma in Niigata Prefecture is a musical road.
