= Japan National Route 291 =

National highway in Japan

National Route 291
- 国道291号
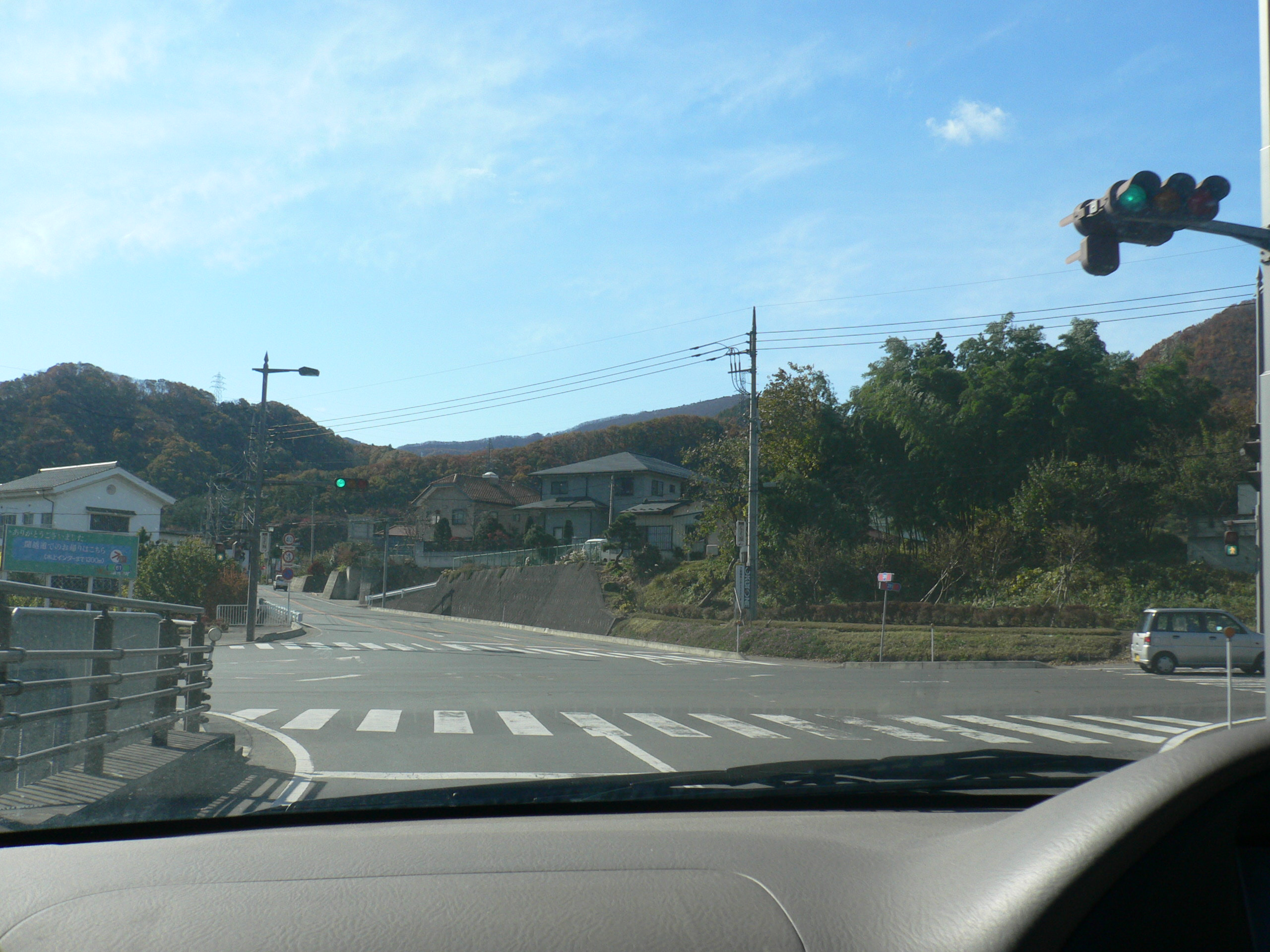

Route information
- Length: 161.6 km (100.4 mi)

Location
- Country: Japan

Highway system
- National highways of Japan; Expressways of Japan
← National Route 290	→ National Route 292

National Route 291 is a national highway of Japan connecting Maebashi, Gunma and Kashiwazaki, Niigata in Japan, with a total length of 161.6 km (100.41 mi).

The route consists of the Nakayama Tunnel, a vehicular tunnel, replacing the former Nakayama Tunnel.

== Route description ==
A section of National Route 291 in the town of Minakami in Gunma Prefecture is a musical road.

A section of the road leading to Ichinokurasawa cliff in Minakami is closed for vehicles during the Summer. A separate section of the road alongside the Nobori River in Minamiuonuma is closed during the Winter.
