= Awara Onsen =

Hot spring resort in Fukui Prefecture, Japan

Awara Onsen 芦原温泉
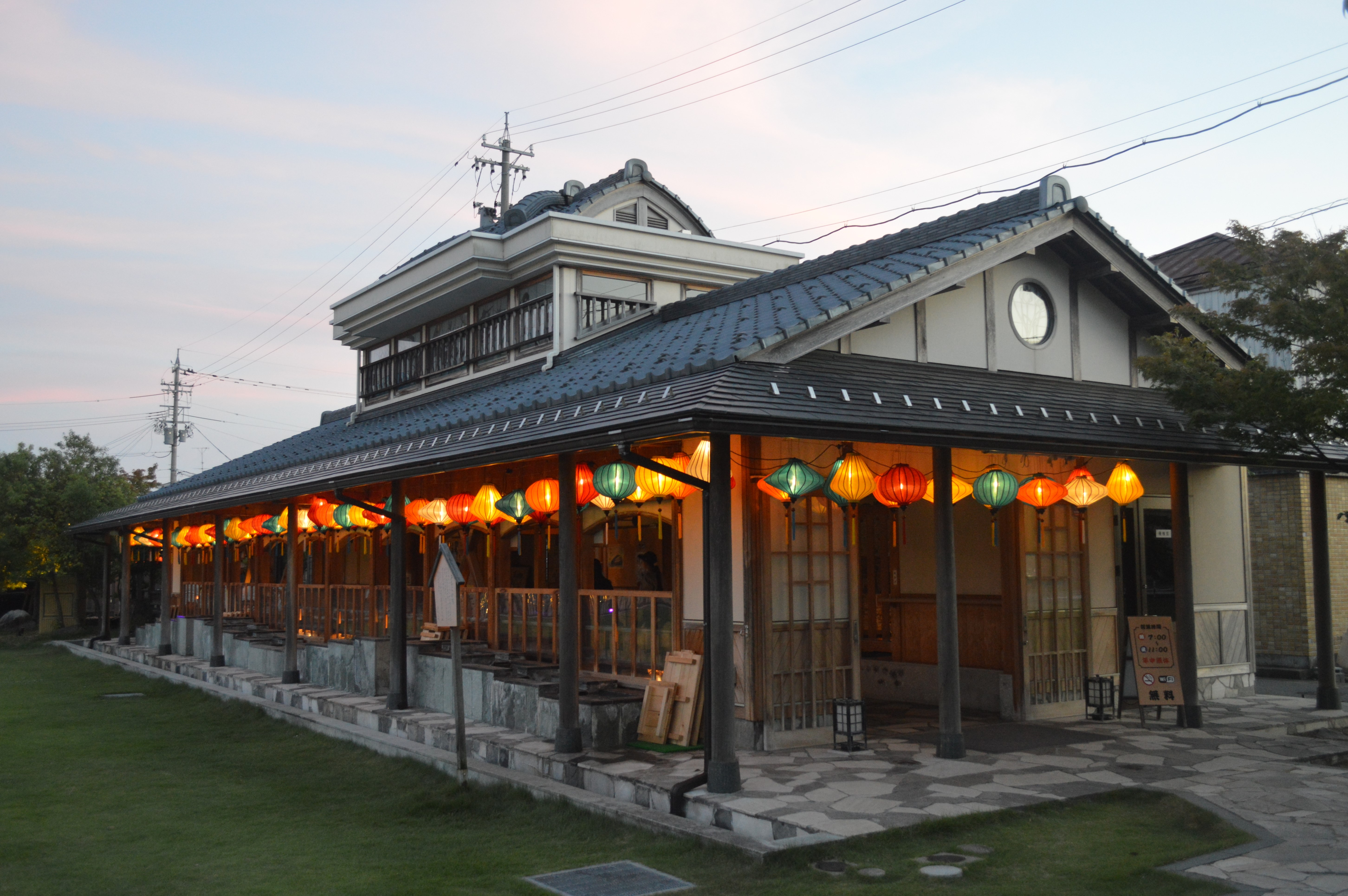
- Ashiyu Awara bathhouse

- Location within Japan
- Location: Awara, Fukui, Japan
- Coordinates: 36°13′30″N 136°11′40″E
- Elevation: 0 m (0 ft)
- Type: slightly alkaline; lithium
- Temperature: 33,5 - 77.5 deg C

Awara Onsen (芦原温泉, Awara onsen) is a hot spring resort in the city of Awara, Fukui Prefecture, Japan.

== History ==
In 1883, a farmer discovered the mineral spring while digging an irrigation well and hit an 80 °C (176 °F) saline hot spring. By the following year, several onsen hotels had already opened and attracted visitors for especially for long-term health care. With the opening of the Japanese Government Railways Mikuni Line in 1911 and the Keifuku Electric Railway Mikuni Ishihara Line (currently the Echizen Railway Mikuni Awara Line) in 1928, the area developed rapidly. However, the area suffered great damage in 1948 Fukui earthquake, and most of its historic buildings were lost in a great fire of 1956.

The onsen hotels were rebuilt with modern materials afterwards, and the onsen remains a designation for visitors especially from the Kansai region and Chubu regions of Japan.

Awara Onsen does not have joint management of the hot springs. Each hotel has several hot spring wells and therefore the spring water varies from source to source.

=== Public footbaths ===
There are three free public footbaths (ashiyu) that are open to locals and visitors. One of the footbaths is located between the onsen-chi (center of town) and the railroad station. Another footbath in town charges a fee.

== Location ==
The onsen town is reached by car from Kanazawa, the ride is between 35 minutes and an hour; or can be accessed by local trains and some express rail trains.

== Gallery ==
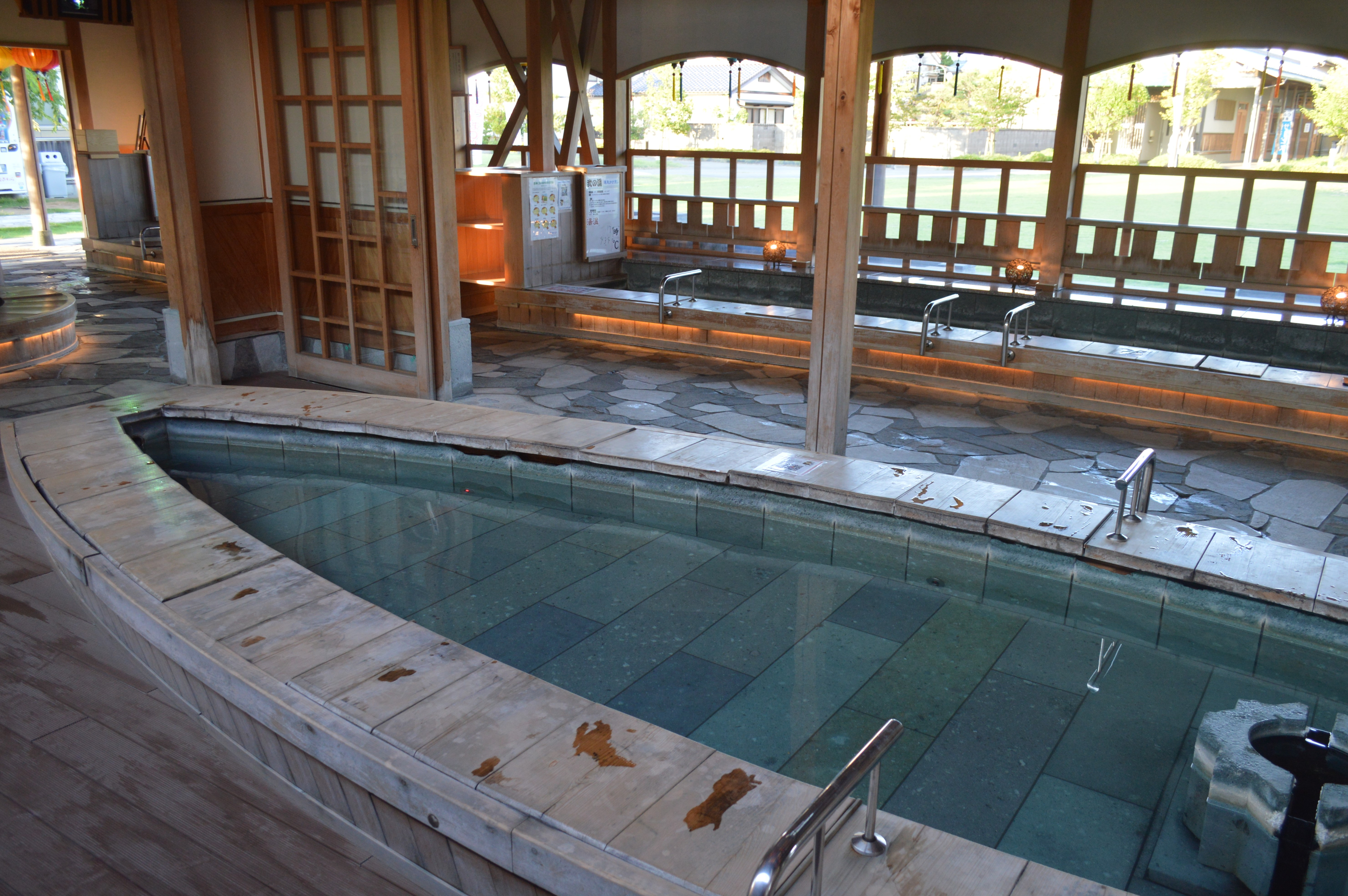
Ashiyu Awara Onsen soaking tub

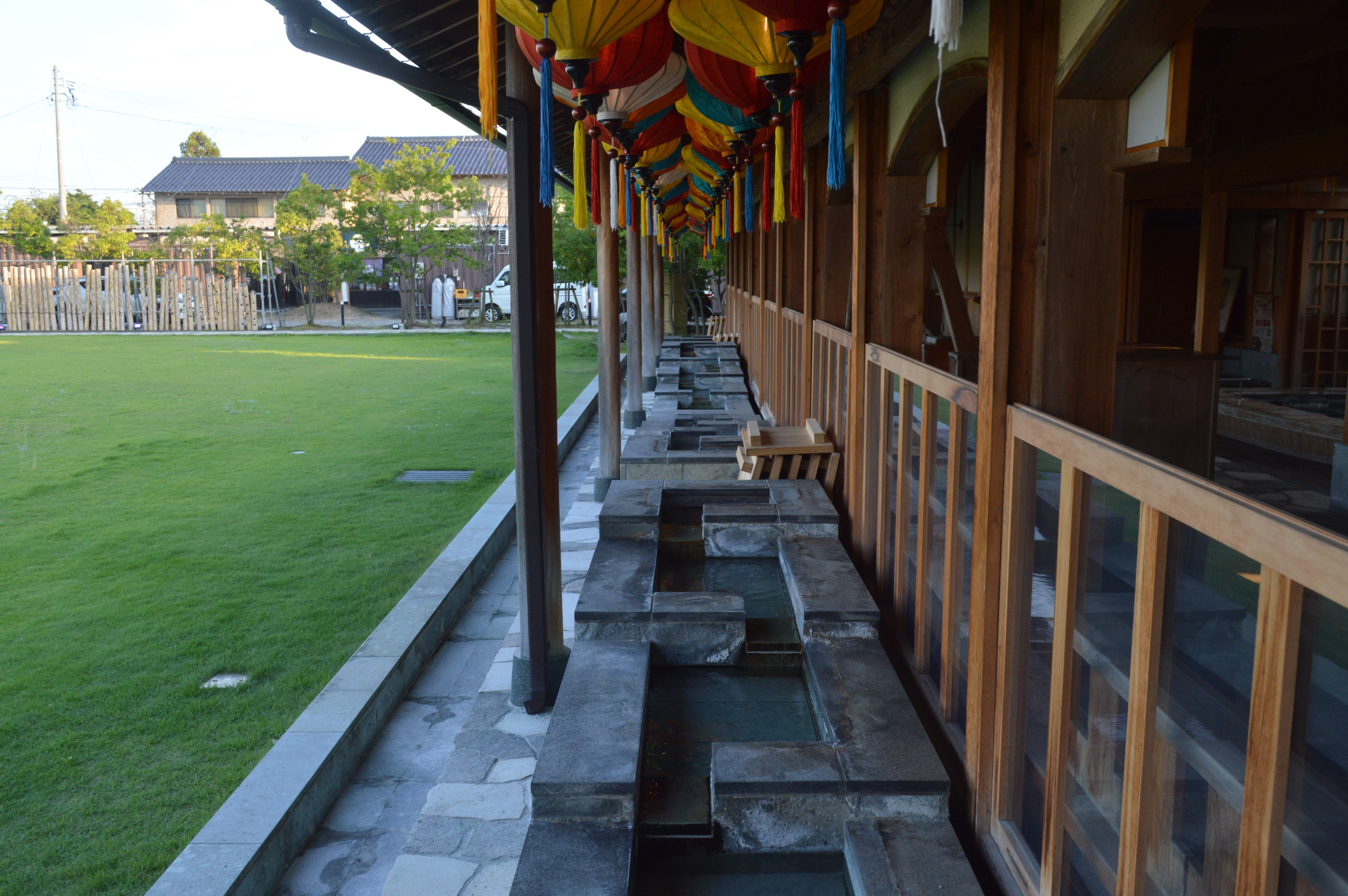
Footbath in Awara onsen town

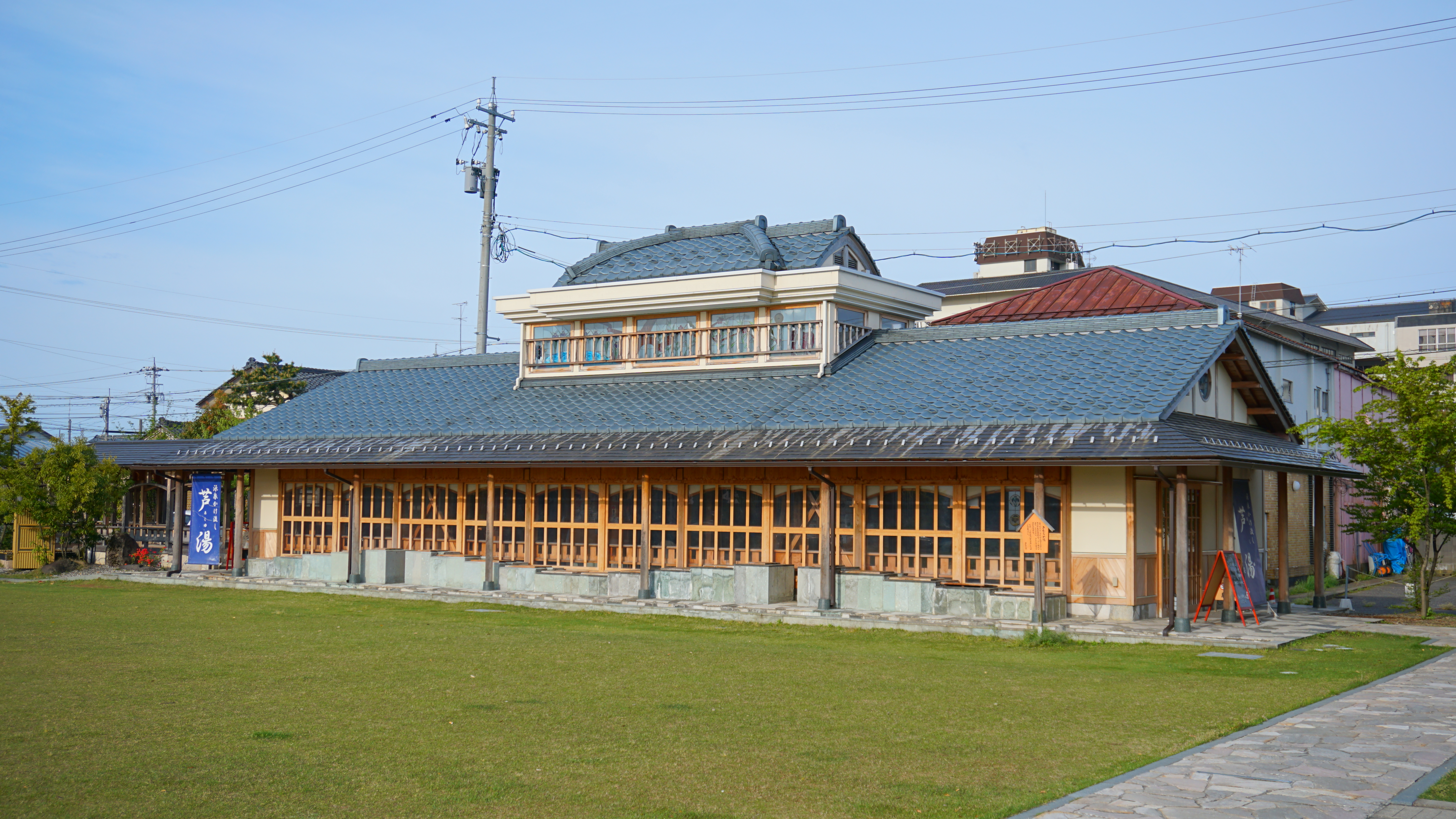
Ahi-yu in Awara Onsen

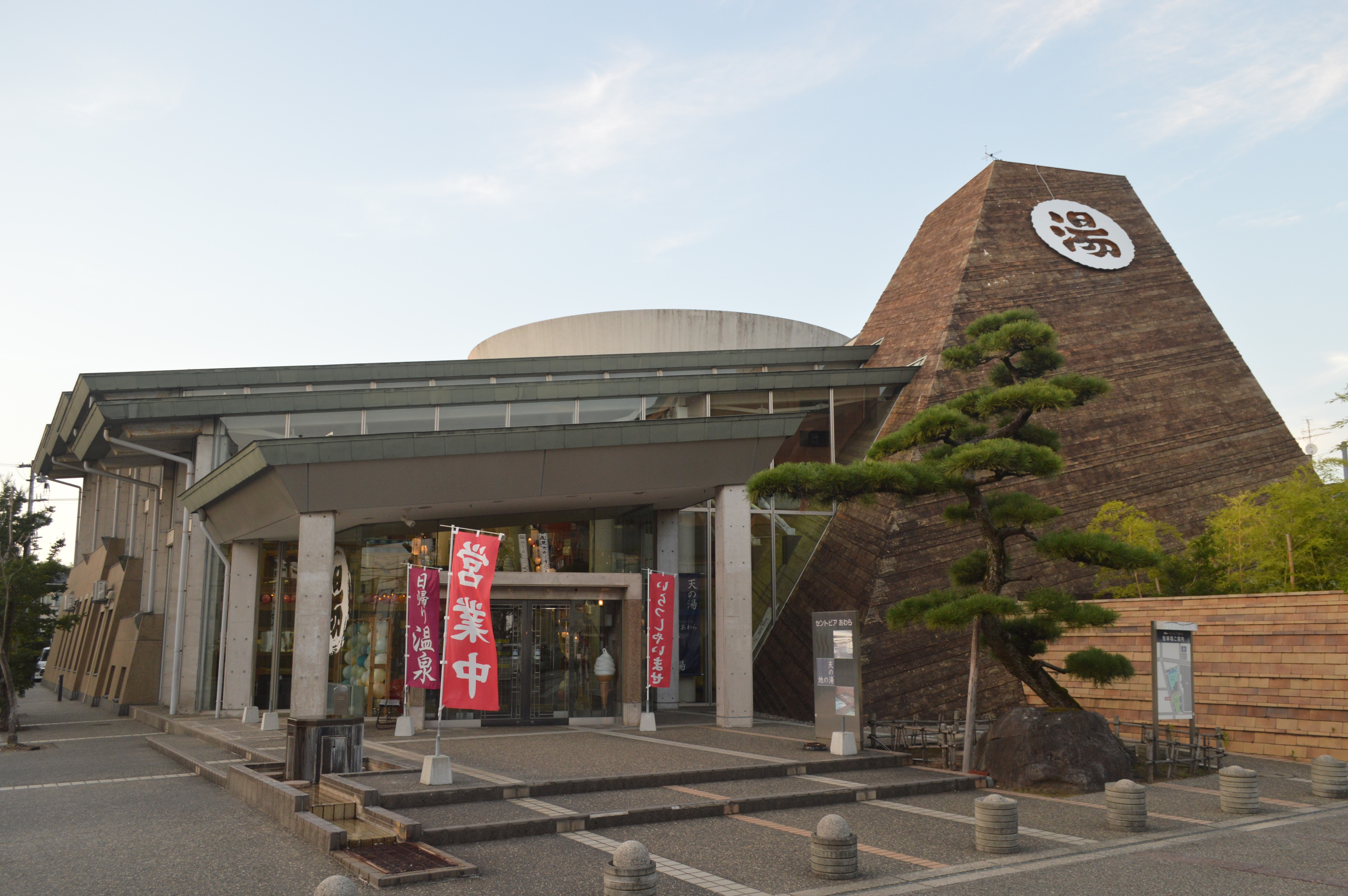
Sentopia Awara bathhouse
