= Girl Crush (disambiguation) =

Girl Crush can refer to:

- Womance, a close relationship between two women
- "Girl Crush", a 2014 single by Little Big Town
- "Girl Crush", a song by the rock band New Politics from Vikings
- Girl Crush, a manga series by Midori Tayama
