= Dusk Beyond the End of the World =

Japanese anime television series

- Key visual

永久のユウグレ (Towa no Yugure)
- Genre: Post-apocalyptic; Science fiction
- Created by: Project FT
- Anime television series
- Directed by: Naokatsu Tsuda
- Produced by: Hiroyuki Aoi; Mitsuhito Tsuji
- Written by: Naokatsu Tsuda
- Music by: Masahiro Tokuda
- Studio: P.A. Works
- Licensed by: Sentai Filmworks; SEA: Tropics Entertainment
- Original network: JNN (MBS, TBS)
- Original run: September 26, 2025 – December 19, 2025
- Episodes: 12 + 0
- Manga
- Written by: Ichi Hamada
- Published by: Kodansha
- Imprint: Shōnen Magazine Comics
- Magazine: Magazine Pocket
- Original run: October 3, 2025 – May 8, 2026
- Volumes: 3
- icon

Dusk Beyond the End of the World (Japanese: 永久のユウグレ, Hepburn: Towa no Yugure; lit. 'Twilight of Eternity') is an original Japanese anime television series produced by P.A. Works for its 25th anniversary. The series aired from September to December 2025.

== Plot ==
The series follows Akira Himegami, a man who was put into cryogenic sleep. Prior to this, he confessed his feelings to his foster sister Towasa Omagi, a noted AI developer, before they were both shot in an assassination attempt. Waking up 200 years later on 2238, he discovers that the world has changed: an organization called OWEL is in power and trying to control all pre-apocalyptic technology. Akira is rescued from their soldiers by Yugure, an android who proposes marriage to him, which he rejects. However, Akira believes that Towasa is still alive and aims to find her. He goes on a quest to find Towasa, with Yugure joining him on his journey.

== Characters ==
Akira Himegami (姫神 アキラ, Himegami Akira)
Voiced by: Shūichirō Umeda (Japanese); Gabriel Regojo (English)
The main protagonist of the series, he lost his parents as a child and went to live with Towasa and her father. He and Towasa confessed their feelings and promised to marry each other. He was shot protecting Towasa and put into cryosleep to save his life, waking up 200 years later after a recent earthquake caused the device he is in to malfunction and discovers the world has ended. He is both worshipped due to being a person from the time of technology and his knowledge of it while also deemed an artifact that the organization OWEL want to own and possess. Believing Towasa is still alive, he along with Yugure travel to find her by going to his home in Tokyo.
It has been uncovered that Akira, all along, is in fact an android possessing the memories of the real Akira Himegami. This stunning disclosure strikes Akira with a profound impact, prompting him to ponder the reason behind his creation, bearing the appearance and recollections of the genuine Akira. Akira learns the real Akira got to the hospital after getting shot, Akira alongside Towasa went through next 13 years of when the LC project went wrong, Towasa's Alpha went rogue and started war to destroy humanity and they developed the androids "Outside Series" that saved humanity and the world became apocalyptic. Akira spearheaded the organization OWEL as its founding director, only for Towasa to disappear without a trace, leaving behind a message urging Akira not to seek her out. Akira Himegami continued to serve as OWEL's director for over two decades, until disease began to take its toll on his body. Desiring to find Towasa, he crafted an android doppelganger of himself, intended to carry out the search on his own behalf. However, for reasons unknown, the real Akira never activated him, leaving him dormant in the research lab for a span of 200 years. Yugure confesses to Akira that she withheld knowledge of his true nature to prove that he is an individual in his own right, rather than a mere duplicate of the real Akira. Akira is deeply moved by this revelation, develops a sincere affection for Yugure, and discovers a renewed purpose to carry on with his existence.
Akira awakens to discover that he and Yugure have slumbered for more than seven years, during which time Amoru has been their vigilant guardian. From Hakubo, Akira learns that his namesake, Akira Himegami, endures, residing in the bowels of Omagi House's labyrinthine laboratory, where he seeks to extend his already considerable lifespan of two centuries. Driven by a desire for closure, Akira yearns to encounter the elder Akira Himegami. Upon their meeting, the aged Akira discloses their profound connection, explaining that through the network he has witnessed Akira's odyssey and all he has beheld. He confesses that he regards Akira as his own offspring and urges him to cherish and live his life to the fullest. Yugure conveys Towasa's heartfelt message to the real Akira, who, in a surge of joy, weeps and then departs this world in peace. Akira and Yugure, together with the still-dormant Amoru, reside on an isle of tranquility. There, Akira and Yugure pledge their love, proposing marriage to one another, and as Amoru stirs from her slumber, they embrace her warmly.
Yugure (ユウグレ)
Voiced by: Yui Ishikawa (Japanese); Ginger Sue (English)
An android in the future who pressures Akira into marriage. Equipped with an impressive arsenal and formidable combat abilities, she is capable of effortlessly overpowering even substantial groups of adversaries. Yugure shares a profound connection with Towasa, bearing a striking resemblance to her and wearing the ring Akira had presented, yet she remains reticent on matters concerning Towasa, dismissing such topics as "taboo". It is later unveiled that Yugure was, in fact, crafted by Towasa as the twelfth model in the "Outside Series", a line of weaponized female androids responsible for ending the AI war and subsequently integrating into the organization known as OWEL.
Upon uncovering the truth that Akira was, in fact, an android all along, and that Yugure was aware of this secret, Yugure decided to confide in Akira the tale of what befell the real Akira and Towasa. Yugure recounted to Akira how she wandered the globe in hiding, eventually discovering the android version of Akira Himegami within a secluded laboratory. Upon reaching the destination, she awaited his awakening. Yugure explained to Akira her silence regarding his true nature; she had yearned for him to experience life as a human, to validate his individuality, especially since their affection for each other had blossomed. Following a meeting with the real Akira, where she delivered Towasa's last message, Yugure and Akira retreated to an isle where Amoru remained in a slumber. There, they mutually proposed marriage to one another, and embracing Amoru warmly as she gracefully awoke from her sleep.
Towasa Omagi (王真樹 トワサ, Ōmagi Towasa)
Voiced by: Ai Kayano (Japanese); Shelby Marie Blocker (English)
She is the only daughter of the Omagi family, who adopted Akira. She is a genius scientist developing cutting-edge AI technology and has attracted attention from around the world. However, because she creates such revolutionary technology, she has been subjected to extreme criticism and interference with her research from some people. She has a crush on Akira, and has been worrying about him lately. She and Akira confessed their feelings and promised to marry, but Akira got shot protecting her and is put to cryosleep. Towasa gave Akira a 200 year old final message to him, but despite this Akira believes she is still alive and goes to find her. It is revealed that in 2052 (13 years during Akira's cryosleep) a war broke out between mankind and AI over the world, Towasa stopped the war by creating androids called the "Outside Series", afterwards she founded the world controlling organization OWEL alongside the Six Sages before she disappeared.
It has been uncovered that Towasa and the genuine Akira arrived at the hospital, reeling from gunshot wounds. Unfortunately, damage to Towasa's uterus has cruelly robbed her of the ability to bear children with Akira. Despite this, Towasa persevered with the LC project, eventually devising compact machines capable of integrating with an individual's bloodstream, dubbed "Femtoblood." However, this innovation took a dark turn when it enabled users to be hacked, leading to criminal acts, and the Femtoblood proved to be incurable. In a bid to rectify this situation, Towasa invented an AI named "Alpha" to counteract the threat, only for "Alpha" to malfunction, opting instead for a path of destruction as "Tera", sparking a war between humanity and AI. In response, Towasa and Akira collaboratively engineered the "Outside Series" androids to vanquish "Tera" and rescue humanity, which ultimately led to the termination of "Tera" and the conclusion of the AI conflict. Though the world was left in ruins, with the destruction of most of humanity, Towasa developed "femtobugs" to rehabilitate the global environment, a task they continue to perform up to the present day. Subsequently, Towasa established the OWEL organization to spearhead the rebuilding of mankind, initiating with a ban on electronic processing. Stringent regulations were enforced to prevent the reemergence of AI technology, and OWEL rose to dominate global governance. Before Towasa's mysterious disappearance with Yugure, she ensured that Akira received a final message.
Towasa succumbed to the natural aging process, but not before imparting wisdom to Yugure regarding the importance of finding someone she loves and living life to the fullest. Yugure then conveyed Towasa's last words to Akira Himegami.
Amoru (アモル)
Voiced by: Miyu Tomita (Japanese); Karlii Hoch (English)
A young girl Akira and Yugure encountered on their travels. She is in pursuit of a cherished picture book, once crafted by her parents, which has since been prohibited. Amoru harbors the aspiration of following in her parents' footsteps to become an author of picture books. However, over time, she has struggled with personal growth, allowing herself to be manipulated by Yokurata in an attempt to hijack Yoiyami.
Yoiyami (ヨイヤミ)
Voiced by: Miyuki Sawashiro
An android bearing the visage of Yugure, she is the tenth model of the Outside Series. Serving as a distinguished commander within the OWEL special forces, she is renowned for her straightforward and unyielding nature. Proficient in combat, she wields an extendable sword with deadly precision. On a mission to track down Yugure, her pursuit seems to be driven by motives that transcend her official duties. Her physical form has been commandeered by the consciousness of Amoru, a result of Yokurata's cunning manipulations.
Hakubo (ハクボ)
Voiced by: Tomori Kusunoki
An android bearing the visage of Yugure, she stands as the first model of the Outside Series. As a distinguished commander within the OWEL special forces, she excels in the realms of search and support operations. Working in close harmony with Yoiyami, she possesses a warm and gentle nature, further enhanced by her acute sensitivity to scents.
Oboro (オボロ)
Voiced by: Toshiyuki Morikawa
A large man who runs a wholesale store. He is a kind-hearted person. He travels from place to place for work and appears wherever Akira and his friends go. Ultimately, it was unveiled that he is the current OWEL director, who followed direct orders given by the original Akira.
Yokurata (ヨクラータ)
Voiced by: Yōhei Azakami
A historian and former OWEL employee. It is subsequently uncovered that he is Dr. Ingmar Hamstrom, a distinguished member of the Six Sages. He inadvertently discovered the vulnerability in Femto blood, which can be manipulated, akin to the android body of Akira. His cunning plot to extract Towasa's location from Yugure was ultimately brought to light by Hakubo, who then employed an electric net to bring about his demise through electrocution.
Idhi (イディ, Idi)
Voiced by: Saki Kobari (Japanese); Chaney Moore (English)
Kalcrom (カルクラム, Karukuramu)
Voiced by: Taito Ban
Fldes (フィーデス, Fīdesu)
Voiced by: Ami Koshimizu
Haniyama (ハニヤマ)
Voiced by: Maki Kawase
Ajisai (アジサイ)
Voiced by: Haruka Shiraishi
Vare (ヴァーレ, Vuāre)
Voiced by: Tetsu Inada
Casuta (キャスタ, Kyasuta)
Voiced by: Rina Satō
Caniss (カニス, Kanisu)
Voiced by: Satoshi Tsuruoka (Japanese); Benjamin McLaughlin (English)
Marlum (マールム, Mārumu)
Voiced by: Takehito Koyasu
Urus (ウルス, Urusu)
Voiced by: Yutaka Nakano
Seshat (セシャト, Seshato)
Voiced by: Mariya Ise

== Production and release ==
Produced by P.A. Works for its 25th anniversary, the series is directed and written by Naokatsu Tsuda, with Tsuda also handling series composition, featuring original character designs by Midori Tayama, animation character designs by Yoshiko Saitō, and music by Masahiro Tokuda. It aired from September 26 to December 19, 2025, on the Super Animeism Turbo programming block on all JNN affiliates, including MBS and TBS. (Note: MBS and TBS listed the series premiere on September 25 at 24:26, which is effectively September 26 at 12:26 a.m. JST.) The opening theme song is "Platform", performed by Uru, while the ending theme song is "Two of Us", alongside Episode 0's ending theme song "Hoshi Tsumugi" (星紡ぎ), both performed by Hana Hope. Sentai Filmworks licensed the series in North America for streaming on Hidive. Tropics Entertainment licensed the series in Southeast Asia for streaming on Tropics Anime Asia YouTube channel.

=== Episodes ===
Note: Hidive and Tropics Anime Asia provide different translations of the episode titles. As such, the English titles are listed by the translated titles as shown respectively.

No.	Title	Directed by	Written by	Storyboarded by	Original release date
0	"Think Morning, Count Two" "The Morning I Kept Inside, Count: One, Two"; Transliteration: "Asa o Kokoro Ni, Ichi, Ni to Kazoeyo" (Japanese: 朝をこころに、一、二と数えよ)	Yuriko Abe	Naokatsu Tsuda	Naokatsu Tsuda	September 26, 2025
In 2029, after being involved in a car crash that killed his parents, 7-year-old Akira Himegami was adopted by professor Kazuya Omagi, and has since then lived with the professor and his daughter Towasa Omagi, who is one year older than Akira. Ten years later, Towasa has become a famous researcher involved in AI and various advances in technology, although there is resistance to the pace of adoption of AI and androids in society among the public and companies. Akira and Towasa go on a date, where the two confess their feelings for each other and begin a relationship with marriage in mind. However, months later, as Towasa is presenting at a conference on her newest AI project, a man from the audience decries her presentation and attempts to assassinate her with a gun; he misses her vital parts when Akira rushes to rescue her. As the attacker attempts to shoot again, Akira shields Towasa and gets hit himself in the back, losing consciousness soon after. Akira later wakes up finding himself naked in a broken capsule inside an abandoned building. Stepping outside, he finds the ruins of what he believes to be the city he once lived in.
1	"The Woman Who Sailed the Soul" "She Who Sets The Spirit Sail in The Sea of Stars"; Transliteration: "Hoshi no Umi ni Tamashī no ho o Kaketa On'na" (Japanese: 星の海に魂の帆をかけた女)	Yuichi Ishima & Shū Honma	Naokatsu Tsuda	Naokatsu Tsuda & Takehiro Miura	October 3, 2025
As Akira tries to understand his surroundings, he is found by a man and a girl, both of whom address him as "Lord Omniscient" and later take Akira to Hakodate, where the settlement consists of a village among the ruins of modern buildings. The man introduces himself as the village chief Weir and the girl as his daughter Idhi. Weir explains that the villagers have worshipped Lord Omniscient for generations, and Hakodate was assigned to guard Akira's location. As Akira spends time in the village, he learns he is a "relic" from a time known as the "Common Era", OWEL is a central world-controlling organization which had abolished the concept of countries, technology in the village is largely absent, and the concept of marriage has been replaced by "ehlsea", a more flexible vow for multiple partners to live together; however, Akira is unable to find information on what has happened in the past. Weir tries to keep Akira in the village, but Weir's brother alerts OWEL of Akira's presence, resulting in Akira, Idhi, and Weir being arrested and taken away by the OWEL director Caniss and his soldiers. While being transported, Akira overhears Caniss giving orders to kill all the villagers in Hakodate. As the soldiers prepare to execute Weir and Idhi, a hooded figure appears and Akira hastily agrees to return a favor in exchange for help. The figure kills Caniss and his soldiers and reveals itself to be a female android with a striking resemblance to Towasa. She introduces herself as Yugure and immediately asks Akira to marry her.
2	"In the North After Doomsday" "In The Northern Land Beyond The End"; Transliteration: "Shūmatsu no Sugita Kita no Chi de" (Japanese: 終末の過ぎた北の地で)	Tatsuya Sasaki	Hitsuji Asakura	Naokatsu Tsuda & Takehiro Miura	October 10, 2025
Akira rebuffs Yugure's marriage proposal. When Yugure shows Towasa's ring to Akira, Akira asks about information on Towasa but Yugure states that such information is classified. Realizing that he is now wanted by OWEL, Akira decides to leave the village with Yugure. They examine the building where Akira had been kept, and Yugure manages to conceal their presence from two other hostile approaching androids--OWEL captains Hakubo and Yoiyami--both of whom also bear Towasa's appearance. Both androids leave after finding no signs of Yugure, and Akira finds a 200 year old recording of Towasa pleading him not to look for her. Still determined to find Toawasa, Akira and Yugure begin the journey to Akira's old residence in Tokyo. Travelling by ferry, they arrive in Ōma, where they encounter Amoru, a skilled painter girl aspiring to be a picture book artist. Akira witnesses the mistreatment of Letogians--people who surrender their human rights in exchange for clearing criminal records and debts, and are treated as a lower social class. Amoru accompanies Akira and Yugure to Mount Osore while evading OWEL patrols, but inside Osore, they are apprehended by OWEL soldiers led by OWEL officer Marlum, Caniss's cousin. Amoru, who is revealed to be a Letogian, admits to betraying Akira and Yugure in exchange for the return of her parents' books that were banned by OWEL. When Marlum states that he had already burned the books and executed her parents, Amoru attacks him and distracts the soldiers, allowing Akira and Yugure to escape. As Akira and Yugure debate on whether to save Amoru, Marlum burns Amoru's last remaining book. When Yugure proposes marriage again in exchange for saving Amoru, Akira criticizes her for being a heartless android and leaves to find Amoru.
3	"Dancing with You Under the Rainy Summer Sky" "Waltzing With You in The Summer Rain"; Transliteration: "Ame Furu Natsu Sora ni Kimi to Odoru" (Japanese: 雨降る夏空にきみと踊る)	Keijirō Taguchi	Hitomi Ogawa	Yusuke Yamamoto	October 17, 2025
Akira infiltrates the prison where Amoru is being held and breaks her out. As Akira and Amoru escape, they encounter Marlum and his soldiers, but Yugure intervenes and overpowers them, having determined that protecting Amoru still aligns with her objectives. Yugure later removes Amoru's tattoo identifying her as a Letogian, and Amoru decides to accompany Akira and Yugure on their journey so she can find more of her parents' books. The trio then travel to Aomori, where "Fica"--a matchmaking festival to help people find partners for ehlsea--is taking place. When Akira rejects Amoru's ehlsea request and Yugure's marriage proposal, Amoru and Yugure decide to attend the festival in order to win his affections, much to Akira's dismay. Elsewhere, siblings Fides and Kalcrom are vying to be the successor to the Lontano family which controls the city. Seeing the need to produce an heir, both also decide to attend the festival. Akira eventually decides to attend out of curiosity, where he notices Yugure drowning her frustrations with wine while avoiding having to socialize with other guests there. Then, he runs into Fides, and accidentally reveals that he is not from the present time. Suspecting that Akira is a fugitive, Fides proposes to ehlsea with Akira in exchange for protection from OWEL, though Akira deduces Fides is actually in love in Kalcrom. He then sees Kalcrom proposing to ehlsea to a drunken Yugure.
4	"A Game of Lime and Allegiance" "The Game of Truth and Dare"; Transliteration: "Sekkai to Seijitsu no Gēmu" (Japanese: 石灰と誠実のゲーム)	Yuri Hagiwara	Hitomi Ogawa	Jōji Furuta	October 24, 2025
After the Fica concludes, Yugure teaches Amoru about the concept of marriage, and offhandedly mentions she knows Towasa. The next day, Kalcrom picks up Yugure for a date and suggests that Fides and Akira accompany them on a double date. In reality, Kalcrom agreed to fake his relationship with Yugure in order to make Akira jealous, since he wants to see if a human-android relationship is possible. Akira meanwhile observes that both Kalcrom and Fides have feelings for each despite being siblings, and wonders if there is a way for them to ehlsea together. As they continue their date around the city, Yugure reveals her identity as an android when she rescues a worker from a falling crate. Fides, confused why Kalcrom would propose to an android, runs off in confusion, and confides to Akira even though she does not want to be the boss of the Lontano family, she feels she must since Kalcrom is too kindhearted for a position that requires ruthlessness. During dinner, Yugure turns down Kalcrom's proposal and both she and Akira insist Kalcrom and Fides ehlsea instead. Suddenly, the Lontano boss ambushes the group, intending to seize Yugure and kill Kalcrom. Fides refuses to obey the Lontano boss' orders and Yugure prepares for battle. Akira spots a sniper and shields Yugure, taking the bullet instead.
5	"Do Androids Dream of Electric Doves?" "Do Androids Dream of Electric Doves?"; Transliteration: "Andoroido wa Denki Hato no Yume ni Tsukaru ka" (Japanese: アンドロイドは電気鳩の夢に浸かるか)	Aya Kobayashi	Hitsuji Asakura	Keisuke Inoue	October 31, 2025
Angered at Akira being hurt, Yugure neutralizes the Lontano boss and his men, but spares their lives at Akira's request. Akira regains consciousness a week later, and learns that Fides usurped her father to become the new head of the Lontano family, and plans to reform it alongside Kalcrom. As Akira's group leave Aomori, they stop at Nyūtō Onsen at Kalcrom's suggestion. Upon arriving, they meet inn proprietress Ajisai, local OWEL commissioner Haniyama, and fellow guest Yokurata. Ajisai and Haniyama are in the midst of a lovers' spat due to Haniyama refusing to quit her job to spend more time with Ajisai as the former had promised. While bathing in the hot springs, Yugure confides to Amoru that she lately has a strange feeling in her chest when she is around Akira, which Amoru points out must be love. That evening, Yokurata reveals himself as an ex-OWEL employee to Akira, and explains the history that happened while Akira was asleep: In 2052, war between humanity and AI broke out, destroying half of Japan and inflicting billions of deaths. Towasa was instrumental in ending the war with the creation of the "Outside Series" of combat androids, but she subsequently disappeared after founding OWEL; OWEL afterwards instituted strict controls on technology and information to prevent another such war from happening again. After Akira spends some time in the hot springs with Yugure and Amoru, Amoru plans to travel with Yokurata and Haniyama to a scenic spot to sketch while Yugure asks Akira out on a date.
6	"The Machine that Shouted Love at the End of the World" "A Chance to Shout Love at World's End"; Transliteration: "Shūmatsu no Hate de Ai o Sakendakikai" (Japanese: 終末の果てで愛を叫んだきかい)	Yuichi Ishima	Hitsuji Asakura & Yoko Yonaiyama	Yūta Murano	November 7, 2025
Akira and Yugure head out on their date while Amoru travels with Yokurata and Haniyama into the mountains. While hiking, Haniyama admits that she has been busy due to trying to delay OWEL's plans to convert Nyūtō into a mining facility. After Amoru also admits that she feels jealous at the thought of Yugure spending time alone with Akira, Yokurata advises both her and Haniyama to be honest towards their respective partners. Meanwhile, Akira and Yugure have an enjoyable date, with Akira's attitude towards Yugure softening. Yugure recalls a conversation from the year 2045 between Towasa and her robot assistants about whether love can exist between AI and humans. She also reveals to Akira that she is one of the "Outside Series" androids, created alongside Yoiyami and Hakubo. After both groups return to the inn, Haniyama decides to mend her relationship with Ajisai and comes clean about OWEL's plans, while Yugure and Amoru both recognize each other as rivals for Akira's affection. Later, as Akira's group leave for Sendai, they are joined by Yokurata who explains he may find what he is searching for if he travels with them. They arrive in Sendai and investigate the local library, but are unable to find any information about Towasa and the AI war. Before heading to Tokyo, Yokurata suggests that they investigate the library's restricted section, revealing that he managed to obtain a key to the library.
7	"Paper Songs of a Budding Primate" "Hymn to the Tome of the Budding Primate"; Transliteration: "Mebukitaru Reichō-rui no Sho e no Sanka" (Japanese: 芽吹きたる霊長類の書への賛歌)	Yuriko Abe	Yoko Yonaiyama	Shinpei Ezaki	November 14, 2025
Yokurata splits up with the group to distract the head librarian, Seshat, advising the group check out an underground book market until it gets dark. However, on the way, they spot Yoiyami and Hakubo standing guard. Yugure creates a diversion to draw the two androids away while Akira and Amoru secure train tickets and proceed to the book market. Upon arriving in the market, they find that the majority of the banned books they had stashed away had been seized in an OWEL raid and were likely taken to the library. Akira and Amoru then sneak into the library but accidentally attract the attention of a guard. Akira knocks him out, and Amoru comments how Akira reminds her of her father. They then enter Seshat's office, where Akira finds a book titled The LC Project authored by Towasa, while Amoru finds one of her parents' books, The Special Blood. However, Seshat is notified by a silent alarm and attacks the pair. During the scuffle, a lantern is knocked over and sets the office on fire. Seshat desperately tries to save whatever books she can, while Akira is left with the choice to either save Towasa's book or Amoru's.
8	"To the Ocean Horizon Descends a Treacherous Swallow" "The Faithless Swallow Succumbs to the Tides"; Transliteration: "Fujitsu no Tsubame wa Umi no Kanata e Shizumu" (Japanese: 不実の燕は海の彼方へ沈む)	Tomoaki Yamashita	Hitomi Ogawa	Hiroshi Nishikiori	November 21, 2025
Akira and Amoru escape the library with The Special Blood, leaving behind The LC Project to burn instead. Yokurata guides the pair to a hideout, where he points out that The Special Blood contains valuable information, since it was dangerous enough to be censored. The book tells about a special blood that granted people special powers, but was misused until twelve "angels" were created to save the world. Akira deduces that the book is telling the story about Towasa's LC Project, which was her plan to "upgrade" humanity with special chip implants. The next morning, the trio leave Sendai by train, with Yugure reuniting with them en route. During the trip, they meet OWEL guard Vare and his family who are moving to a new city. Vare privately requests to the group to help him make amends to his wife Casta, who is still angry at him having an affair ten years ago, and they decide to reenact their original ehlsea proposal. Akira and Yugure encounter Yoiyama and Hakubo on the train, and they agree to a temporary truce. Akira asks them about Towasa's whereabouts as he is confident she is still alive, and they reveal that only Yugure has that knowledge.
9	"Overlooking the Expanse of Days Past" "Staring Into the Horizon of the Past"; Transliteration: "Sekijitsu no Kanata o Muite" (Japanese: 昔日の彼方を向いて)	Shun Tsuchida	Hitomi Ogawa	Yusuke Yamamoto	November 28, 2025
Amoru overhears Akira asking Yugure why she refuses to disclose information on Towasa. Yugure replies that she and Towasa had made a promise long ago, and may be able to share with Akira in the future. Vare and his daughter Luv help prepare the bouquet for the proposal, while his son Caelo bonds with Amoru over drawing. In the bar carriage, a drunk Yoiyami berates on being left behind by Yugure, and recalls being created along with the other androids by Towasa, who addressed the androids as her "daughters", and that when Towasa disappeared, she only took Yugure with her. Vare manages to reenact his proposal to Casuta, to the cheers of the other train passengers; although privately, Casuta is still unwilling to forgive Vare and insists on separation, resulting in her and the children alighting the train in the next station. Akira and the others alight at the train's terminus at Ōmiya, where Yoiyami challenges Yugure to a duel which takes place in an abandoned stadium. Yugure manages to electrocute Yoiyami and corner her, but Yoiyami cuts through Yugure's core. As Yoiyami delivers the final blow, Akira lunges forward to intervene and takes the hit instead, exposing a metallic body beneath his skin, causing him to realize that he is an android. Akira is then angered at Yugure when Yoiyami further reveals that Yugure had been withholding the truth about Akira's android identity from him. As Akira comes to terms with the fact that he is not human and never was Akira Himegami, he questions his memories and purpose for finding Towasa; Yugure resolves to tell him everything she knows.
10	"His and Her Long Afternoon" "The Endless Twilight They Shared"; Transliteration: "Kare to Kanojo no Nagai Gogo" (Japanese: 彼と彼女の長い午後)	Naokatsu Tsuda & Keijirō Taguchi	Naokatsu Tsuda	Naokatsu Tsuda	December 5, 2025
After Akira questions Yugure's identity, Yugure explains the events that led to the present timeline. The original Akira and Towasa survived the shooting incident, however Towasa's uterus was damaged preventing her from bearing any children. Seeking a solution, she advanced her research in AI and cybernetics, eventually developing an enhancement known as Femto Blood. Although publicly released, it was discovered that it had a critical backdoor vulnerability that allowed infused humans to be hacked and controlled to commit various crimes. The ensuing chaos from these hacks lead to a terrorist attack on Towasa that killed her father and left her permanently maimed. Towasa created a new AI named Alpha to help find a solution to the hacks, but Alpha instead went rogue, concluding that humanity itself was a threat that needed eradication. The resulting AI takeover devastated the world. Under Towasa's leadership, the Outsider Series androids were developed to combat Alpha, now referring to itself as Tera. Yugure herself would be the most advanced Outsider Series model based on Ichikishima, Towasa's personal AI. After Alpha was defeated, Earth was left in a state of disarray due to the destruction with less than 200 million people remaining. The organization called OWEL was then founded and headed by Towasa and her research team with Akira being the first leader. A total ban and destruction of digital computers was enacted to prevent any new AI development. At some point during Akira's reign, Towasa disappeared, burdened by the guilt of her actions that led to catastrophe. As his health deteriorated, Akira created an android in his likeness whose main purpose is to find Towasa, however it was not used and was accidentally activated 200 years later. Yugure then tells Akira that she initially did not tell him about his true nature because she wanted him to live life as his own person rather than as a copy of the original Akira. Touched by Yugure's compassion, Akira finds the will to keep on living. Akira then wakes up from an apparent coma and is met by Yugure and a now adult Amoru, much to his shock.
11	""Don't Cry," She Said" ""Hold Back Your Tears," Said the Girl"; Transliteration: "Nagareru na Namida, to Shōjo wa Itta" (Japanese: 流れるな涙、と少女は言った)	Tomoaki Yamashita	Hitomi Ogawa	Taizo Yoshida	December 12, 2025
Following Akira's awakening, Amoru reveals that following Akira falling into a coma, Yugure connected herself to him to try and wake him up, resulting in them both falling asleep for over seven years. Amoru devoted the entirety of that time maintaining them. While Akira and Yugure express their gratitude to her, she feels a degree of separation between herself and them. Amoru confesses her feelings to Akira for both him and Yugure, but he maintains his devotion to Yugure. Hakubo later reveals that the original Akira is still alive in the Omagi laboratory. Akira and Yugure decide to see him. Amoru meets with Yokurata and expresses to him how she feels left behind by Akira and Yugure, thinking that her being human is why the three of them cannot be together. Yokurata offers to grant her wish, and she accepts, leaving Akira and Yugure to head to OWEL's headquarters on their own. They meet up with Oboro, who turns out to be the director of OWEL, and that he was tasked by the original Akira to keep watch over the two of them before escorting them to him personally. Elsewhere, Yokurata injects Amoru with Femto Blood before hacking her mind. Yoiyami meets with her and is injected with Femto Blood herself. As Yokurata sets the two of them up to transfer Amoru's consciousness into Yoiyami's body, Hakubo appears and deduces that he is actually Professor Ingmar, one of Towasa's six lead scientists of the LC Project 200 years ago. He confirms this, having hidden his presence and his identity all to see Towasa again. Before Hakubo can stop him, she is beheaded by Yoiyami, now with Amoru's consciousness before going to Akira and Yugure. Hakubo manages to regenerate and prepares to battle Yokurata. Oboro reveals to the two of them that OWEL's search for Towasa is by the request of the original Akira's personal AI, Tagitsu, now OWEL's AI administrator. As they make their way to the laboratory, Amoru appears before them in Yoiyami's body and asks them to ehlsea with her.
12	"Your Love Belongs to You" "Your Love is Yours"; Transliteration: "Anata no Ai wa Anata no Mono" (Japanese: あなたの愛はあなたのもの)	Shū Honma, Tomoaki Ōta, Yuichi Ishima & Naokatsu Tsuda	Naokatsu Tsuda	Tensai Okamura	December 19, 2025
In the wake of Yokurata's cyber assault and the turmoil of alternating personas, Amoru wrenches Akira's core from within, prompting Yugure to confront her in fierce combat. Throughout the struggle, the personalities of Yoiyami and Amoru shift seamlessly, leading Yugure to the piercing realization of her inadvertent harm upon both due to her obliviousness to their depths of emotion. Concurrently, Hakubo brings about Yokurata's demise through electrocution, with Yokurata professed his unwavering love for Towasa in his final breaths. Yugure emerges victorious over Yoiyami, who succumbs to exhaustion after torching her own core. In a selfless act, she bestows the power of her core to Akira, sacrificing her existence to preserve his. Convinced of Yugure's demise, Akira is overcome with grief until Tagitsu appears and instructs him to place her in a repair pod for recovery. Akira subsequently encounters the original counterpart, who confesses to having regarded him as a son. After shutting down his life support to energize the repair pod, the original Akira implores both Akira and Yugure to cherish every moment of life, with Yugure conveying Towasa's eternal love for him. With this reassurance, the original Akira dies in peace. Hakubo retrieves Yoiyami's remains, acknowledging that while her physical form can be restored, her memories have been irretrievably lost. Moreover, Amoru remains in a vegetative state until she recovers from Yokurata's digital interference. In the intervening years, Oboro assumes command of OWEL, initiating reforms to alleviate its former tyranny, the companions Akira and Yugure encountered on their journey continue their respective lives, and Hakubo introduces the newly reconstructed Yoiyami to their sisters. Akira and Yugure reside to a secluded island where Towasa's grave is located, and they decide to marry each other. They do not feel romantic for Amoru but recognizing that they both still care her, Yugure proposes having a "unique" wedding ceremony. Eventually, Amoru awakens from her coma, joyously reuniting with Akira and Yugure.

== Manga ==
A manga adaptation illustrated by Ichi Hamada was serialized on Kodansha's Magazine Pocket app from October 3, 2025, to May 8, 2026. The first tankōbon volume was released on December 9, 2025.

No.	Japanese release date	Japanese ISBN
1	December 9, 2025	978-4-06-542119-2
2	March 9, 2026	978-4-06-542967-9
3	June 9, 2026	978-4-06-543889-3

== See also ==
- Girl Crush, a manga series by Midori Tayama, the original character designer
