= Kakunodate Castle =

Coordinates: 39°36′17″N 140°33′39″E

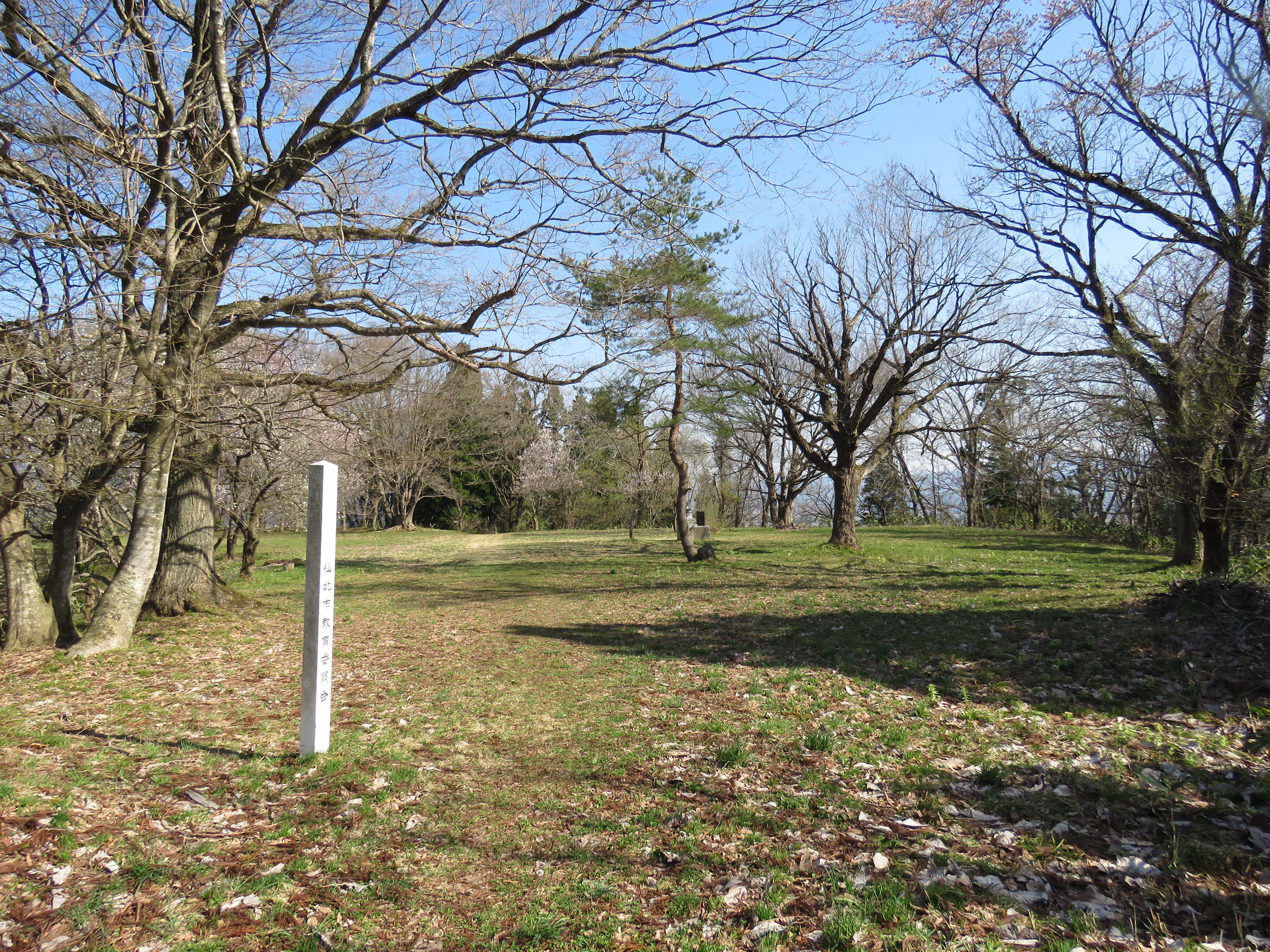
Image of Kakunodate Castle remains

Kakunodate Castle (角館城, Kakunodate-jō), also known as Asakura Castle and Ryugasaki Castle, was a mountaintop castle (yamashiro) located in Kakunodate, Akita Prefecture, Japan. Its roots can be traced to when Moriyasu Tozawa was given the area in 1590, though it may have been constructed prior to this. Due to a Shogunal decree that each domain was to retain only one castle, it was demolished in 1620. Only ruins remain at the site on Mount Furushiro.

== History ==
The Kakunodate palace flourished as a Samurai town in the early 17th century and is often referred to as "Little Kyoto". Although the castle no longer survived, its legacy can be seen in the well-preserved samurai houses, many of which are centuries old.

== Location ==
To the north of Kakunodate's samurai district the former castle site is located on the hill. From the samurai district It can be reached on foot in about 20-30 minutes.

== Sources ==
- https://web.archive.org/web/20080313191125/http://www.jcastle.info/castle/profile/15-Kakunodate-Castle
- https://www.city.semboku.akita.jp/en/sightseeing/spot/07_shiroato.html
