= Onsen =

Japanese hot springs

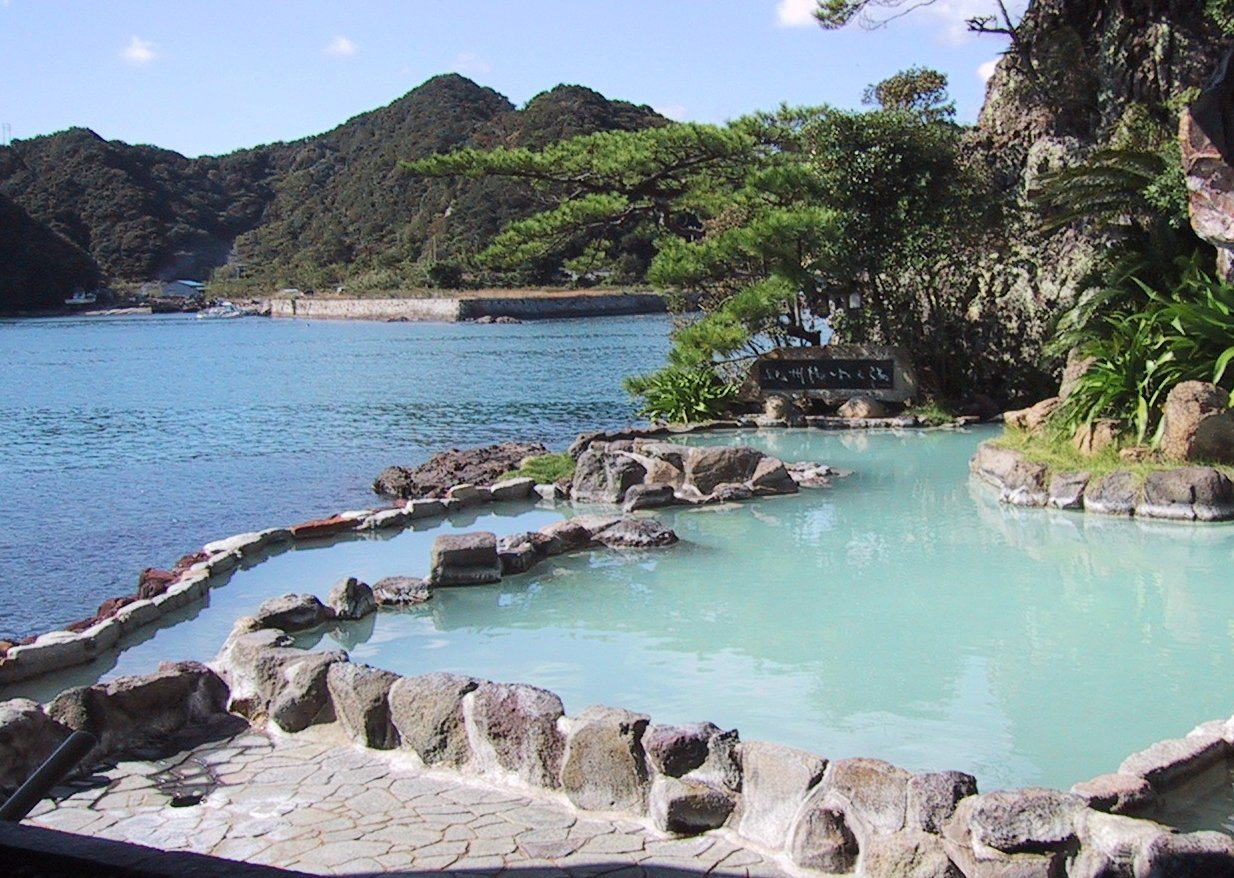
Outdoor onsen at Nakanoshima in Nachikatsuura, Wakayama

A video showing the stool and shower used for cleaning off, an inside pool and an outside pool

In Japan, onsen (温泉; pronounced [oɰ̃seɴ]) are hot springs and the bathing facilities and traditional inns around them. There are approximately 25,000 hot spring sources throughout Japan, and approximately 3,000 onsen establishments use naturally hot water from these geothermally heated springs.

Onsen may be either outdoor baths (露天風呂 or 野天風呂, roten-buro / noten-buro) or indoor baths (内湯, uchiyu). Traditionally, onsen were located outdoors, although many inns have now built indoor bathing facilities as well. Nowadays, as most households have their own baths, the number of traditional public baths has decreased, but the number and popularity of hot spring resort towns (温泉街, onsen-gai) have increased since the end of Second World War. Baths may be either publicly run by a municipality or privately, often connecting to a lodging establishment such as a hotel, ryokan, or minshuku.

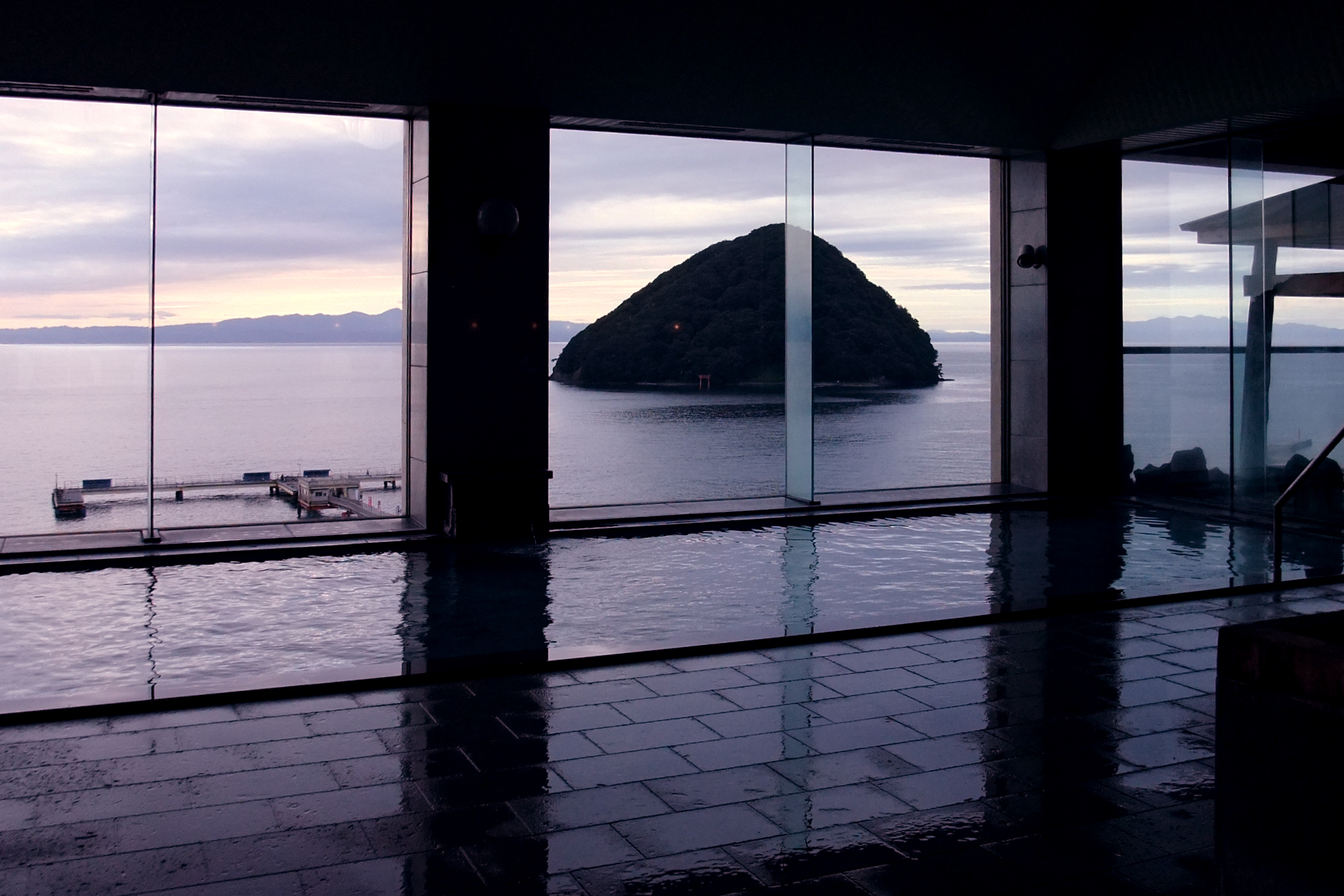
Indoor onsen at Asamushi Onsen

The presence of an onsen is often indicated on signs and maps by the symbol ♨, the kanji 湯 (yu, meaning "hot water"), or the simpler phonetic hiragana character ゆ (yu).

== Definition ==
According to the Japanese Hot Springs Act (温泉法, Onsen Hō), onsen is defined as "hot water, mineral water, and water vapor or other gas (excluding natural gas of which the principal component is hydrocarbon) gushing from underground". The law states that mineralized hot spring water that feeds an onsen must be at least 25 °C (77 °F) originating at a depth of at least 1.5 kilometres (0.93 mi), and contain specified amounts of minerals such as sulphur, sodium, iron, or magnesium. Even if it does not meet this definition, if the spring water is suitable for bathing, it is considered a "hot spring" in most cases. However, in that case, there are restrictions on the health benefits that the owner of the spring can claim.

When onsen water contains distinctive minerals or chemicals, establishments often display what type of water it is, in part because the specific minerals found in the water have been thought to provide health benefits. Types include sulfur onsen (硫黄泉, iō-sen), sodium chloride onsen (ナトリウム泉, natoriumu-sen), hydrogen carbonate onsen (炭酸泉, tansan-sen), and iron onsen (鉄泉, tetsu-sen).

In contrast to natural springs, facilities using artificially heated water or added minerals are legally classified as jinkō-onsen (人工温泉, artificial hot springs). Following revisions to the Hot Spring Act, these establishments are subject to strict disclosure requirements to prevent misleading advertising, though they remain distinct from naturally occurring geothermal sources in regulatory oversight.

== History ==
Exactly when humans first began bathing in onsen in Japan is unknown, but historical records show it has a history of at least about 1,300 years. Many of the earliest records of onsen bathing document Japanese Emperors or members of the imperial family staying at onsen for long periods of time. At the time, onsen were thought to be sacred and to have healing properties. It is now believed those who traveled to onsen in these early records were seeking cures to disease or other ailments by bathing in the onsen water. This ancient practice of bathing in onsen to cure illnesses, often for long periods such as a week, is referred to as tōji (湯治). Some of the oldest onsen in Japan are considered to be Dogo Onsen in Ehime Prefecture, Shirahama Onsen in Wakayama Prefecture, and Arima Onsen in Hyogo Prefecture.

Until around the Edo period, onsen had close religious ties to Buddhism with temples often being built near onsen sources. During the Edo period, however, onsen began to gain popularity among the general population thanks in part to depictions of the hot springs in ukiyo-e. It is also during this period that the use of onsen shifted from being primarily for religious and healing reasons to being used for bathing for cleanliness and socializing.

In modern times, traveling to hot spring resort towns (温泉街, onsen-gai) is a popular form of domestic tourism in Japan. During the bubble economy of the 1980s, there was a "onsen boom." Although the number of overnight guests at hot spring resorts has decreased slightly since the boom, travel to such onsen towns as a relaxing getaway is still popular among Japanese people. Furthermore, onsen tourism remains a critical economic pillar for many rural municipalities, often serving as a primary strategy for machi-zukuri (community development) to counteract regional population decline and economic stagnation.

== Mixed bathing ==
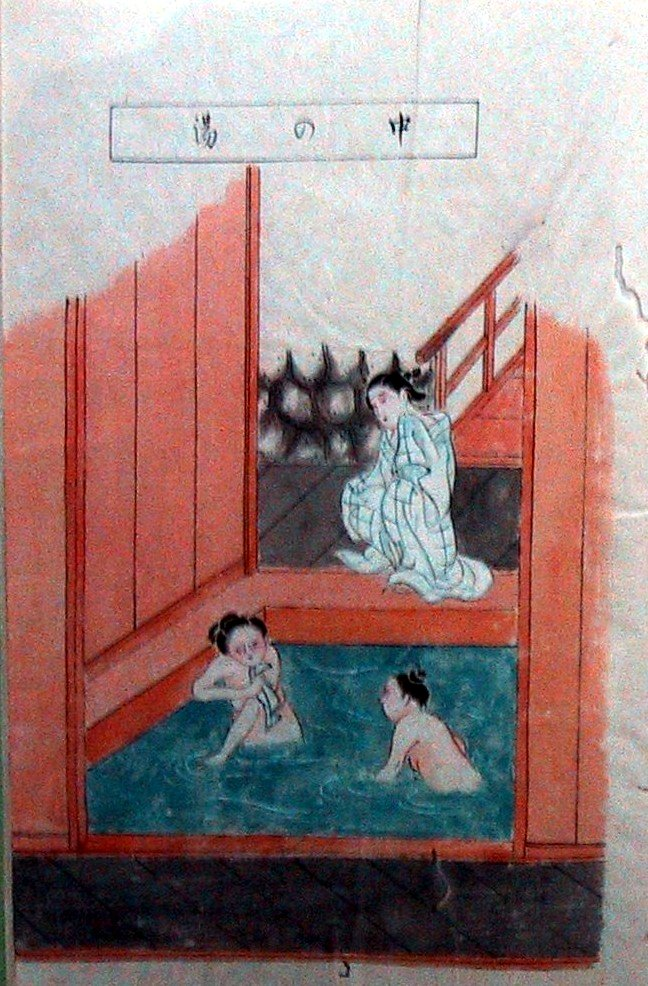
Guidebook to Hakone from 1811

Traditionally, men and women bathed together at both onsen and sentō communal bathhouses, but gender separation has been enforced at most institutions since the opening of Japan to the West during the Meiji Restoration.

Mixed bathing (混浴, kon'yoku) is currently banned in Japanese public baths. (Note: Due to varying interpretations of terminology and local ordinances, rare instances of mixed bathing still exist at places like Tsurunoyu Onsen where the water is opaque.) Depending on the prefecture and local ordinances, children seven years old and younger may be exempt from this ban.

Private onsen called "family baths" (家族風呂, kazokuburo) can be found in many locations throughout Japan. These can be reserved and used for mixed bathing.

In the Japanese language, "Onna" (女/おんな) means Woman and "Otoko" (男/おとこ) means Man. The characters ゆ and 湯 (pronounced yu) stands for Hot water, but also for a Bathing or Onsen. Generally, there is a separation called Noren (暖簾/のれん) curtains.

== Etiquette ==
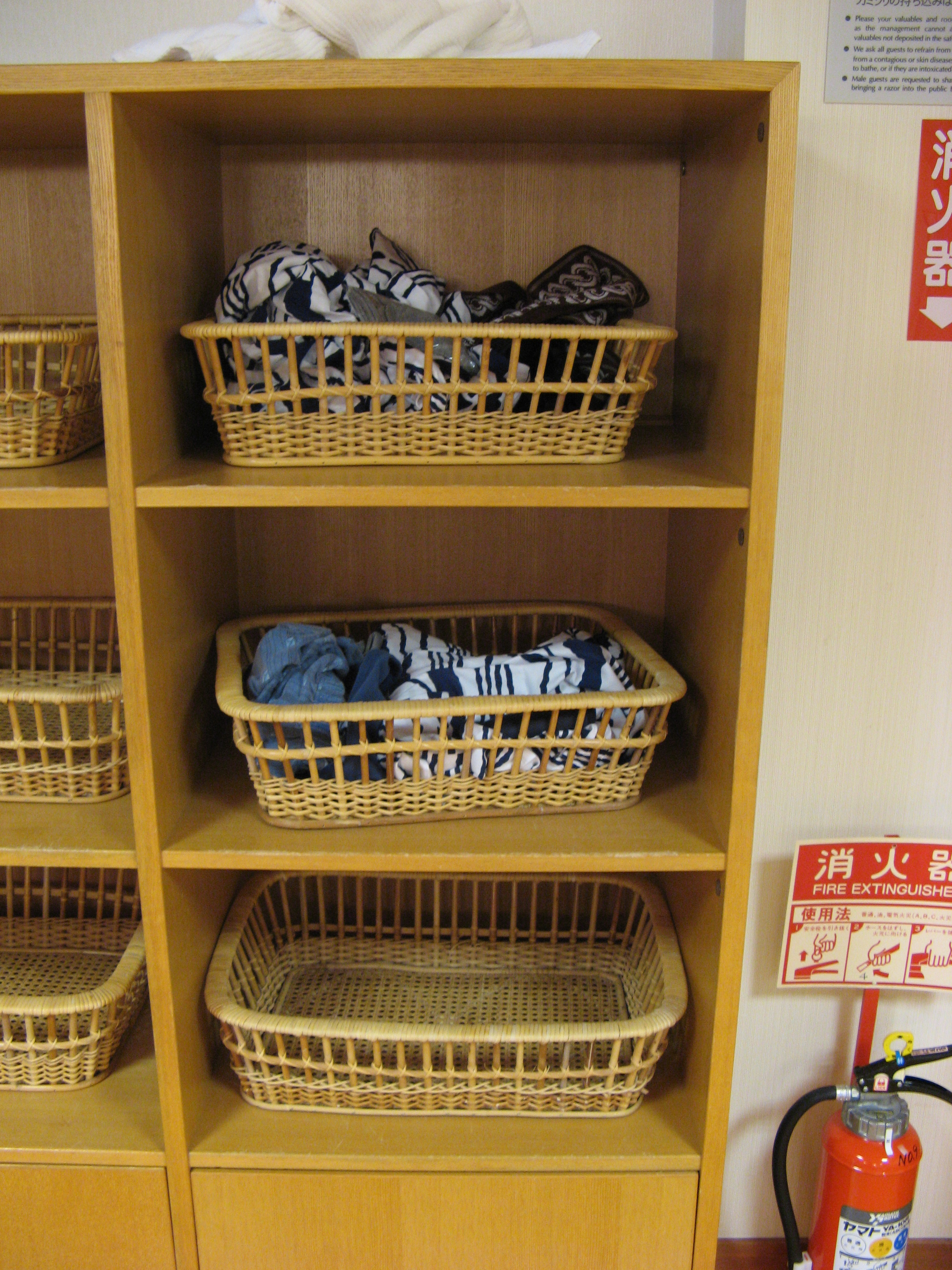
Baskets

Onsen are a location where considerable offense can be caused if the proper social etiquette is not observed. The general procedure and expected etiquette closely resemble those used at a sentō but with some minor adjustments. Onsen are typically, but not always, found within ryokan or hotels and only available to guests, though they may offer certain hours where outsiders may purchase day passes to enter. Standalone onsen open to the public also exist. Onsen are considered more of a special experience than the sento, which is used for common bathing. Due to their integrated location within a hotel, an entry attendant is rare and bathers will usually wear the hotel-provided yukata and indoor slippers to walk from their rooms to the onsen. Towels are provided to guests at the entry, and shower stations and vanities are fully stocked with toiletries and conveniences for bather's use, instead of guests being required to bring their own or purchase such items separately. Guests should not take wet towels or toiletries back with them or hoard the complimentary items. While it is common after a bath in the sento to quickly re-shower before leaving, many onsen bathers skip this second shower to keep the minerals from the hot spring on their skin. Onsen within ryokan or hotels are generally kept open 24 hours a day, or are only closed for a brief daily cleaning period, to allow guests to freely bathe in the middle of the night if the whim takes them. Popular, private, or specialized baths may require reservations or additional fees.

=== Ensuring cleanliness ===
As at a sentō, at an onsen, all guests are expected to wash and rinse themselves thoroughly before entering the hot water. Bathing stations are equipped with stools, faucets, rinsing basins, and complimentary toiletries such as soap and shampoo; nearly all onsen also provide removable shower heads for rinsing convenience. Entering the onsen while still dirty or with traces of soap on the body is socially unacceptable. (Note: In very isolated, undeveloped, natural onsen, where there is no possibility to use soap before entering in the bath, onsen users are expected to at least rinse their body with the water of the bath before entering it.)

One's hair should never touch the bath water and should be worn up.

Even though onsen can be a premium experience and environment according to some people, its etiquette expects guests to clean up after themselves by staying tidy and rinsing off their shower area for the next guest.

=== Swimsuits ===
Guests are not allowed to wear swimsuits in the baths or showers and must be completely nude.

The only time swimsuits are allowed and required are in specific modern pools which allow both men and women to use them together, but many of these mixed onsen resemble more of a pool or waterpark than the traditional idea of an onsen.

=== Towel ===
Onsen guests generally have a small towel with them to use as a drying cloth, since re-entering the changing area while dripping wet is a faux-pas. The towel can also provide a modicum of modesty when walking between the washing area and the baths by holding it loosely in front of your genitals. Though many TV shows depict characters wearing a towel in the bath, this is a television invention used for actor modesty and wearing towels into the bath is forbidden. It is against the rules to immerse or dip towels in the onsen bath water, since this is considered unclean. People are to set their towels off to the side of the water when enjoying the baths, or place their folded towels on top of their heads to keep them out of the water.

=== Tattoos ===
By 2015, around half (56%) of onsen operators had banned bathers with tattoos from using their facilities. The original reason for the tattoo ban was to keep out yakuza and members of other crime gangs who traditionally have elaborate full-body decoration. In 2016, the Japan Tourism Agency urged onsen operators to allow foreign customers with tattoos to use the onsen on a conditional basis in order to accommodate the increasing number of foreign tourists. On the other hand, onsen operators wanted foreign customers to enjoy the onsen, but were concerned that allowing foreign customers with tattoos to use the onsen would prevent them from keeping yakuza out of the onsen.

However, tattoo-friendly onsen do exist. A 2015 study by the Japan National Tourism Organisation found that more than 30% of onsen operators at hotels and inns across the country will not turn someone with a tattoo away; another 13% said they would grant access to a tattooed guest under certain conditions, such as having the tattoo covered up. Some towns have many tattoo-friendly onsen that do not require guests to cover them up. Two such towns are Kinosaki Onsen in Hyōgo and Beppu Onsen in Ōita.

With the increase in foreign customers due to growing tourism, some onsen that previously banned tattoos are loosening their rules to allow guests with small tattoos to enter, provided they cover their tattoos with a patch or sticking plaster.

== Benefits ==
There are various health benefits attributed to bathing in onsen. Onsen are particularly renowned for their relaxing and therapeutic effects. These effects are due to properties such as the temperature, pressure, and mineral composition of the water.

A 2014 study conducted in Beppu, a city famous for its onsen, found that regular bathing in onsen has various health benefits such as lowering blood pressure, improving circulation and cardiovascular health, reducing chronic pain and fatigue, and lowering the rate of depression. A survey conducted in Atami, another city famous for its onsen, found that individuals with onsen in their homes were less likely to take blood pressure medication than those without onsen.

There are various types of onsen including carbonated springs, iron-containing springs, acidic springs, strong-smelling sulfur springs, among others. Each type of onsen is believed to have unique benefits. Carbonated springs, for example, are believed to lead to smooth skin. Onsen facilities often advertise various health and beauty benefits they claim their water to provide.

Water at some onsen facilities is drinkable. Onsen water should only be consumed if it is confirmed to be safe to drink by the prefecture. The water should be obtained from a designated drinking source that is separate from the water which is bathed in. The often mineral-rich onsen water is believed to have benefits such as treating iron-deficiency anemia or constipation.

== Risks ==
Article 18, paragraph 1 of the Japanese Hot Springs Act publishes guidance on contraindications and cautions for bathing in hot springs, and drinking their respective waters. Although millions of Japanese bathe in onsen every year with few noticeable side effects, there are still potential side effects to onsen usage, such as aggravating high blood pressure or heart disease.

Legionella bacteria have been found in some onsen with poor sanitation. For example, 295 people were infected with Legionella and seven died at an onsen in Miyazaki Prefecture in 2002. (Note: In addition to this case, two people were infected and one died at Arima Onsen in 2022. In the same year, Legionella bacteria up to 3,700 times the standard value were detected at an onsen in Fukuoka Prefecture because the water was changed only twice a year.) Revelations of poor sanitary practices at some onsen have led to improved regulation by hot-spring communities to maintain their reputation.

There have been reports of infectious disease found in hot bodies of water worldwide, such as various Naegleria species. While studies have found the presence of Naegleria in hot spring waters, Naegleria fowleri, responsible for numerous fatal cases of primary amoebic meningoencephalitis around the world, has not been found to be present in the water at onsen. Nevertheless, fewer than five cases have been seen historically in Japan, although not conclusively linked to onsen exposure.

Many onsen display notices reminding anyone with open cuts, sores, or lesions not to bathe. Additionally, in recent years onsen have been increasingly adding chlorine to their waters to prevent infection, although many onsen purists seek natural, unchlorinated onsen that do not recycle their water but instead clean the baths daily. These precautions as well as proper onsen usage (i.e. not placing the head underwater, washing thoroughly before entering the bath) greatly reduce any overall risk to bathers.

Voyeurism is reported at some onsen. In 2016, The Japan Times reported that this was mitigated in some prefectures of Japan where nude mixed bathing is not permitted, and that visitors must wear swimsuits. In 2021, several people were arrested in connection with an organized group accused of taking photos of women in open-air baths.

== Environmental and resource management ==
The traditional kake-nagashi (掛け流し) method, where water flows continuously from the source and is not recycled, is valued for maintaining the water's natural chemical composition. However, this practice consumes significant volumes of groundwater and thermal energy. In response to resource depletion, several prefectures have enacted local ordinances to limit pumping volumes and drilling depths. Consequently, many modern facilities have been compelled to adopt water filtration, recycling, and heat recovery systems, altering the traditional operational model of onsen establishments.

== Bathing methods ==
In addition to typical large public baths (大浴場, daiyokujō) and outdoor baths (露天風呂, roten-buro)), there are various other methods of experiencing onsen that can be found at various facilities throughout Japan. Examples include:

- Waterfall baths (打たせ湯, utase-yu): hot water is released from an elevated position and the pressure of the water has a massaging effect.
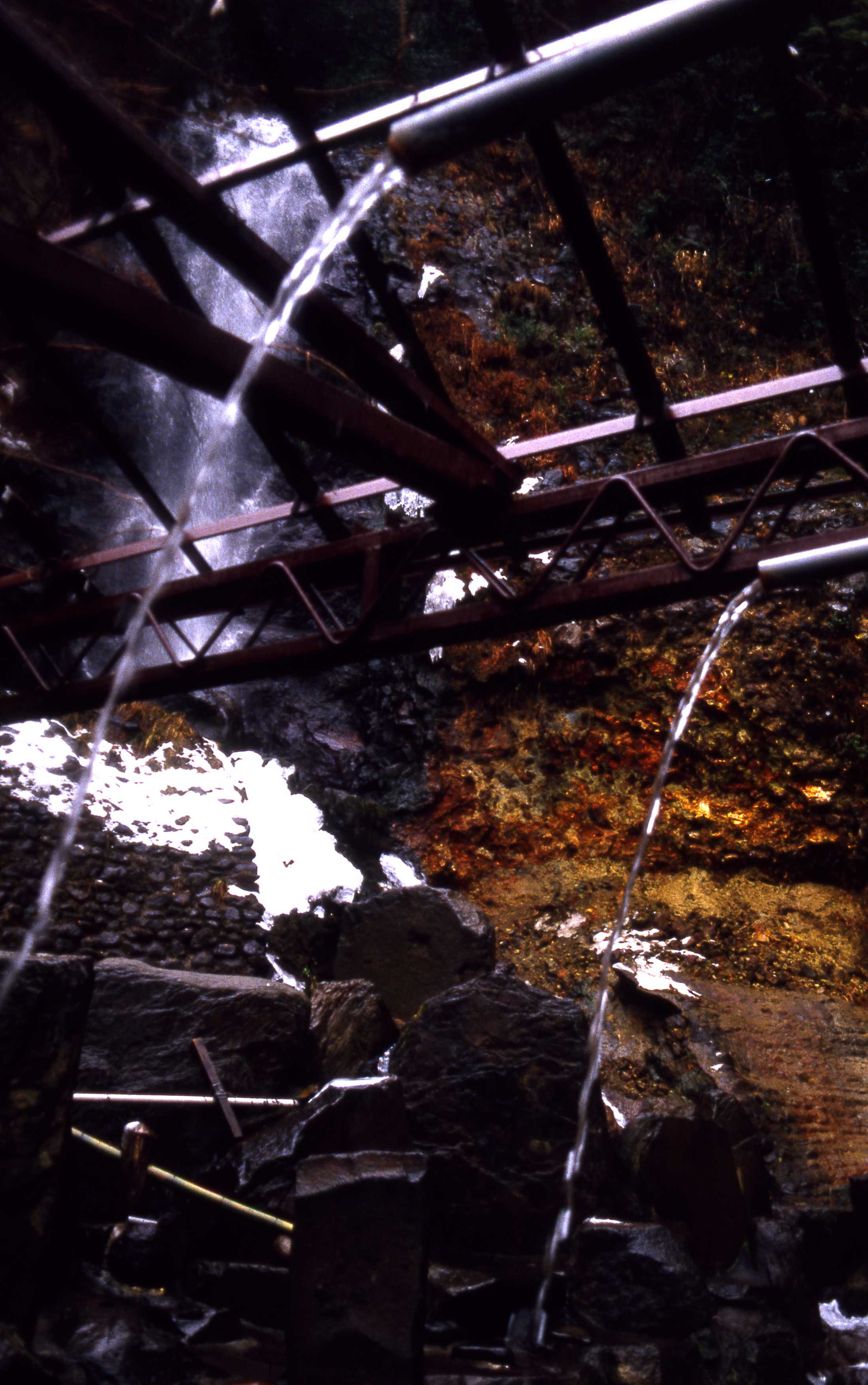
  Utase-yu waterfall bath at Tarutama Onsen (垂玉温泉)
- Steam baths (蒸し湯, mushi-yu): onsen steam is released in either a small room or a "steam box" (in which one immerses their body up to their neck) which has an effect similar to a sauna.
- Sleeping baths (寝湯, ne-yu): shallow baths in which one lies down. These can be used for sleeping, but there is a risk of overheating.
- Ashiyu (足湯, ashi-yu): these are usually separate from main onsen facilities and are typically free. As only the feet and lower legs are immersed in the onsen water, users are otherwise fully clothed.
- Sand baths (砂湯, suna-yu): an individual lies in or is buried partially in sand which is heated by onsen water or another source. Yukata are usually worn in the sand baths and they are mixed-gender.
- Ganban'yoku (岩盤浴): heated stones on which visitors lie down while wearing kannaigi (館内着), or a type of casual Japanese indoor wear. As clothing is worn in ganban'yoku, they are mixed-gender and located in a separate location from the nude bathing area of an onsen facility.

Saunas are also sometimes located at onsen bathing facilities. A relatively cold bath called mizu-buro (水風呂) is often located directly outside a facility's sauna to allow users to quickly cool down. The cycle of entering hot baths, saunas, and cold baths at an onsen facility is sometimes referred to as totonou (ととのう) and is believed to be refreshing and to have health benefits.

== Selected onsen ==
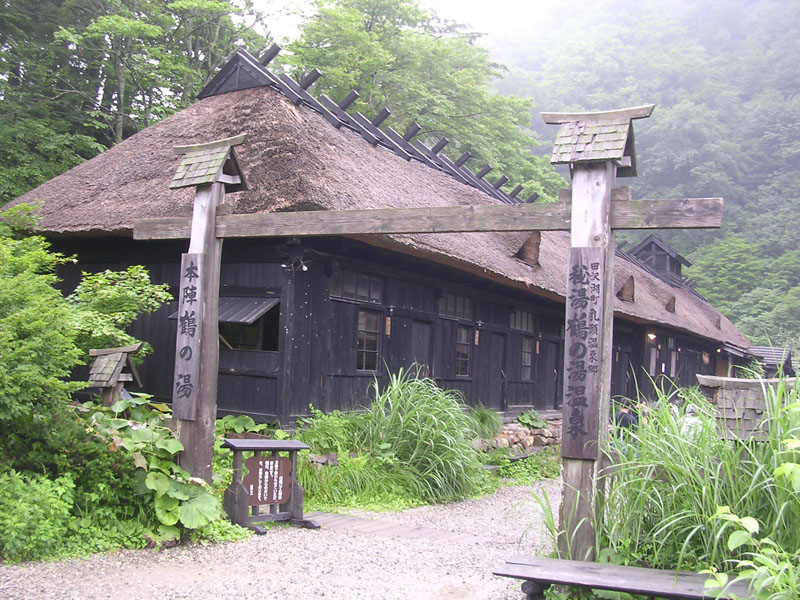
Old Tsuru-no-yu Bathhouse in Nyūtō Onsen area, Akita

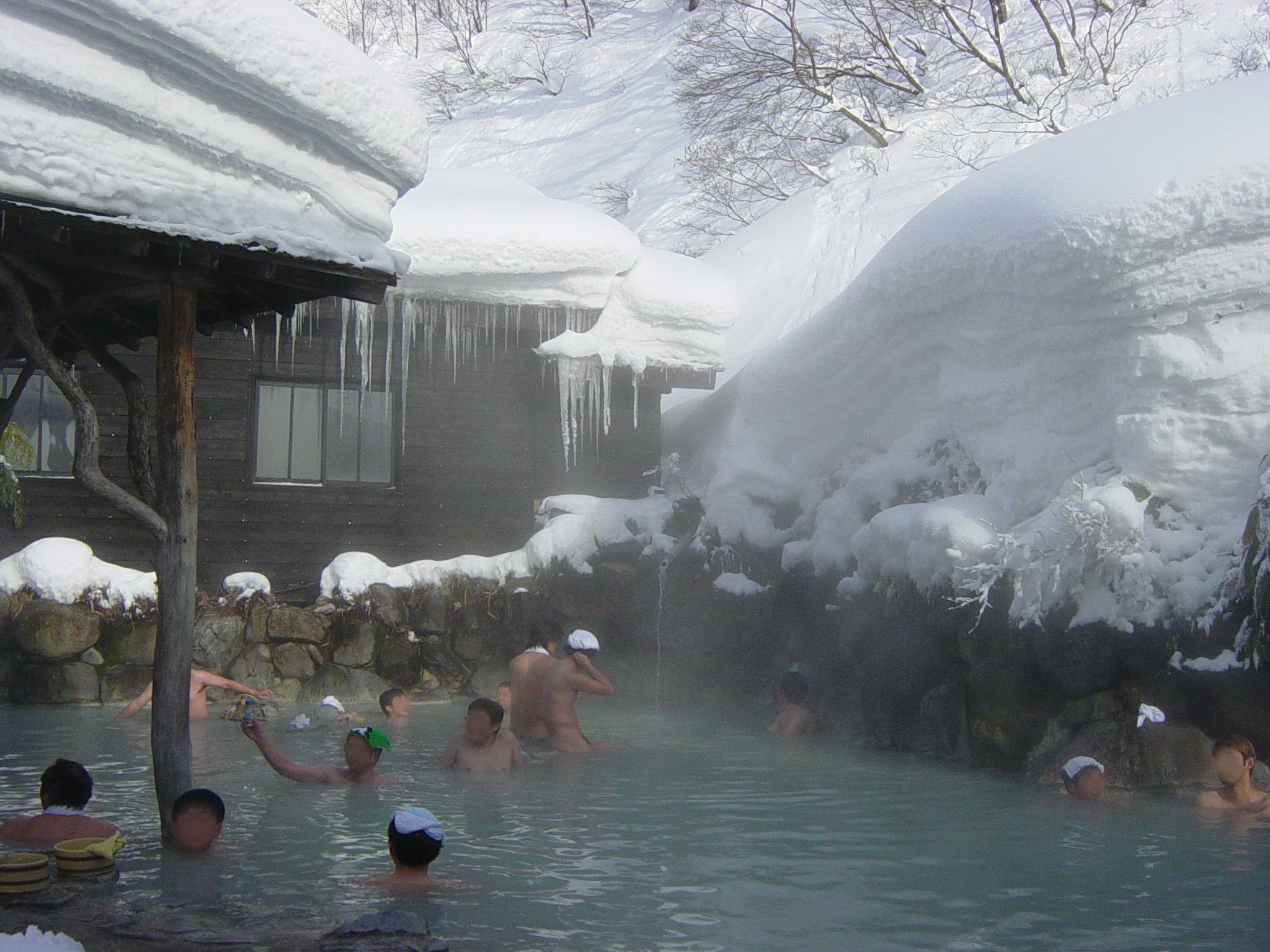
Winter bathing at Tsuru-no-yu roten-buro in Nyūtō, Akita

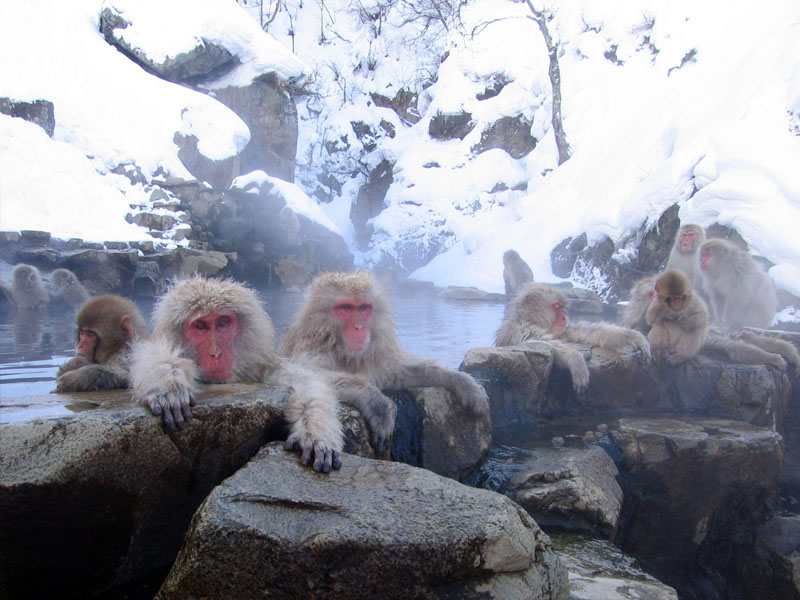
Japanese macaques enjoying a roten-buro open-air onsen at Jigokudani Monkey Park

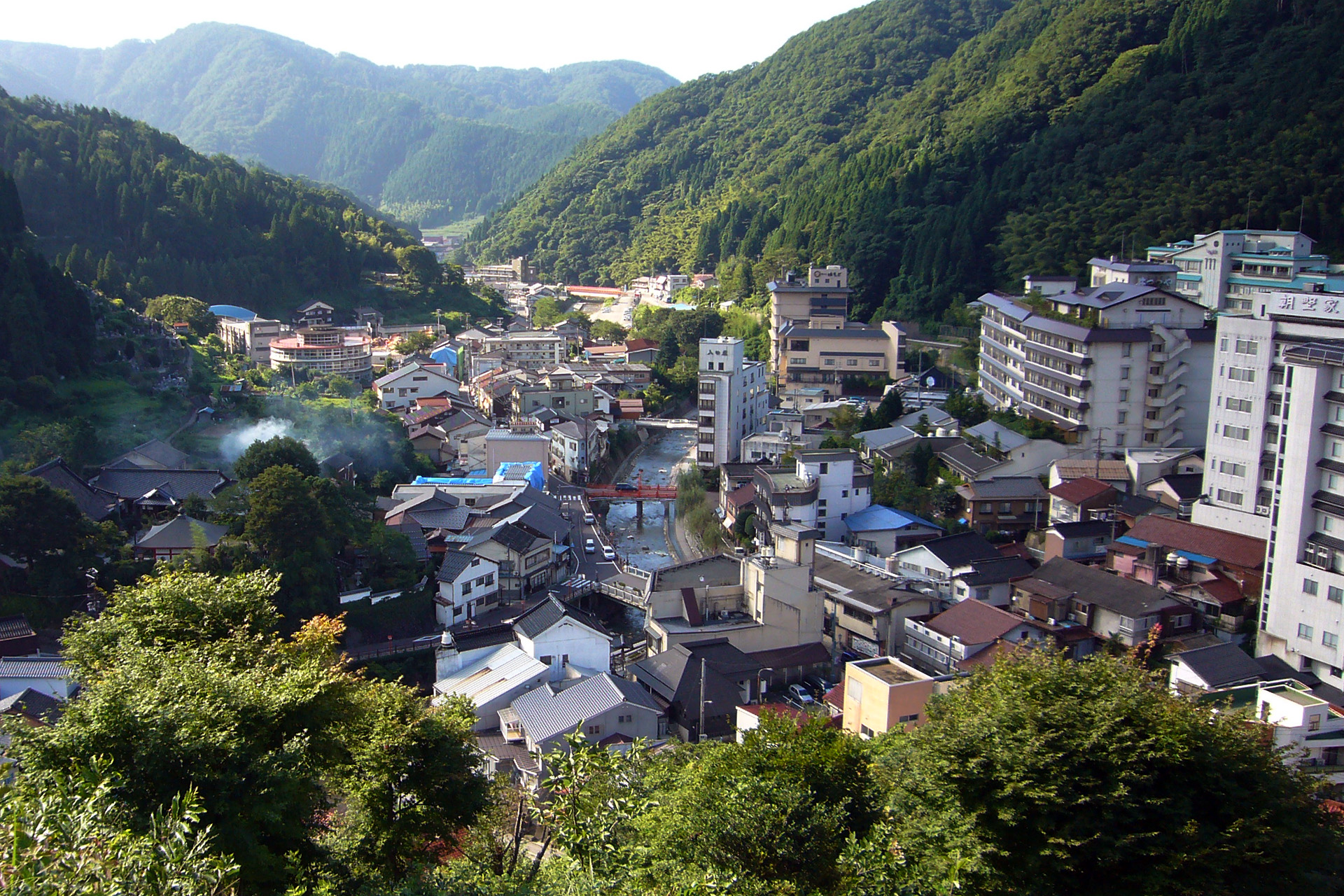
Yumura-onsen's hot-spring resort and forests in Shin'onsen, Hyōgo

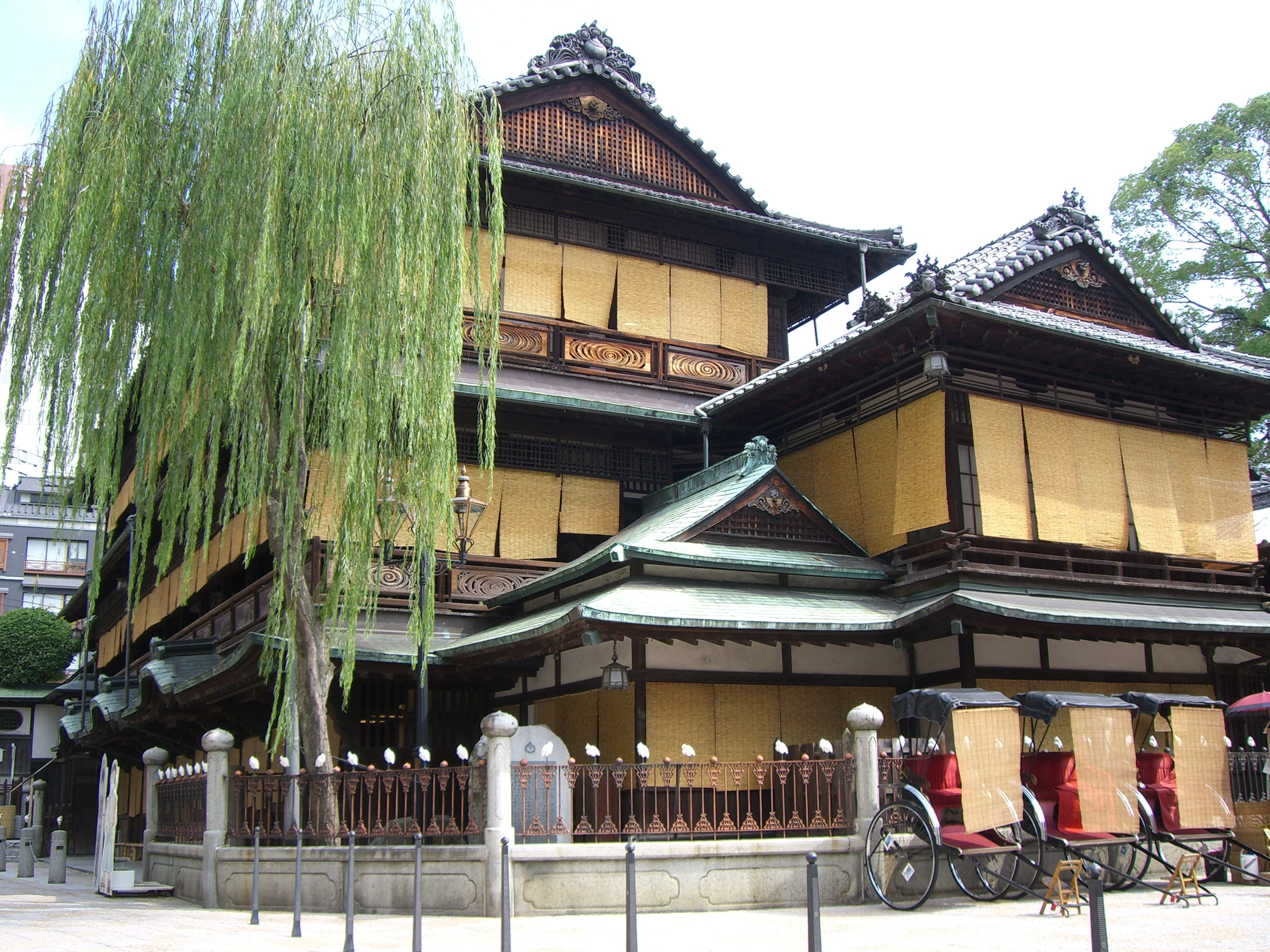
Dōgo Onsen hot springs (main building) in Matsuyama, Ehime

Ginzan Onsen in Obanazawa, Yamagata

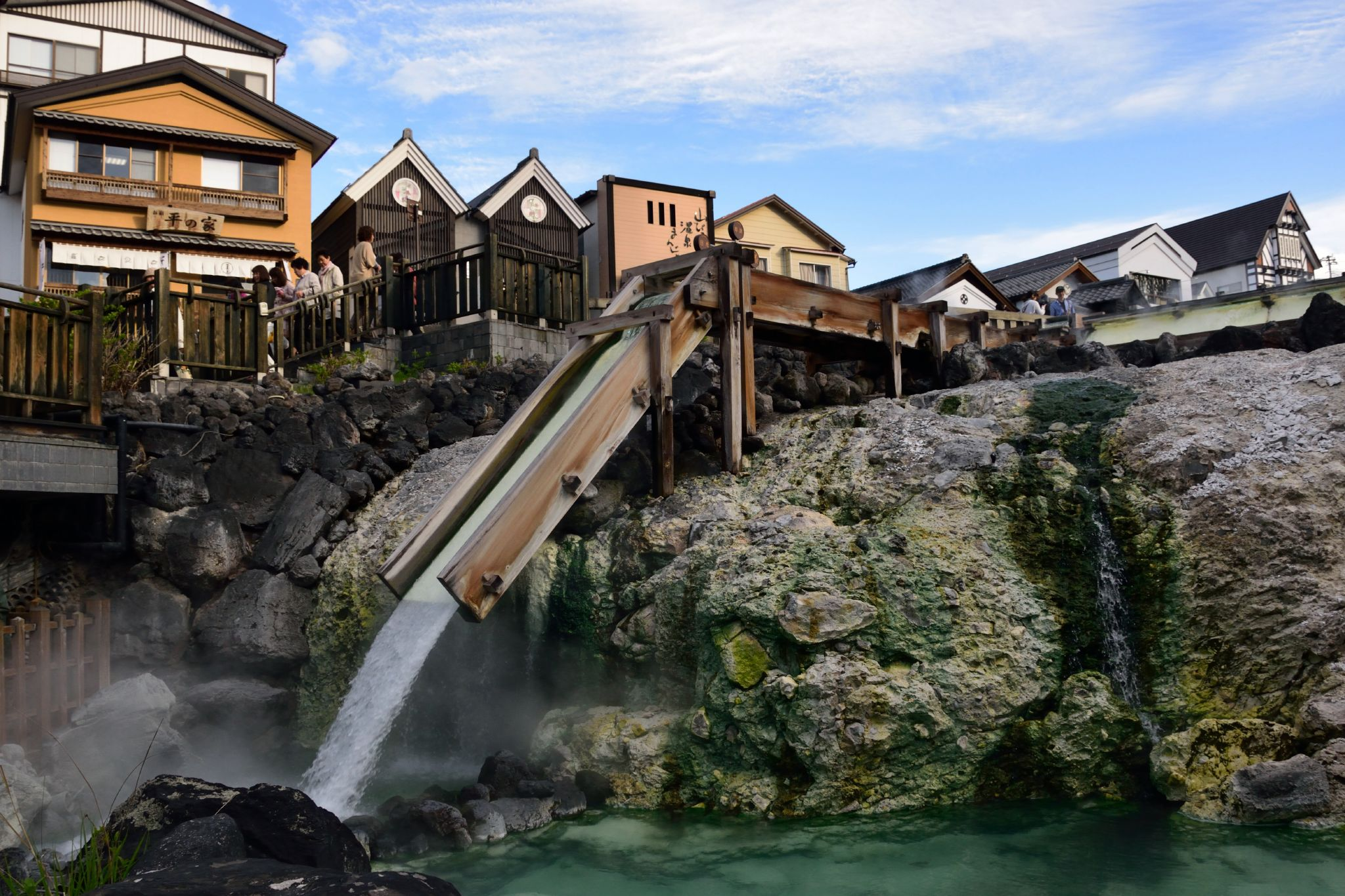
Kusatsu Onsen

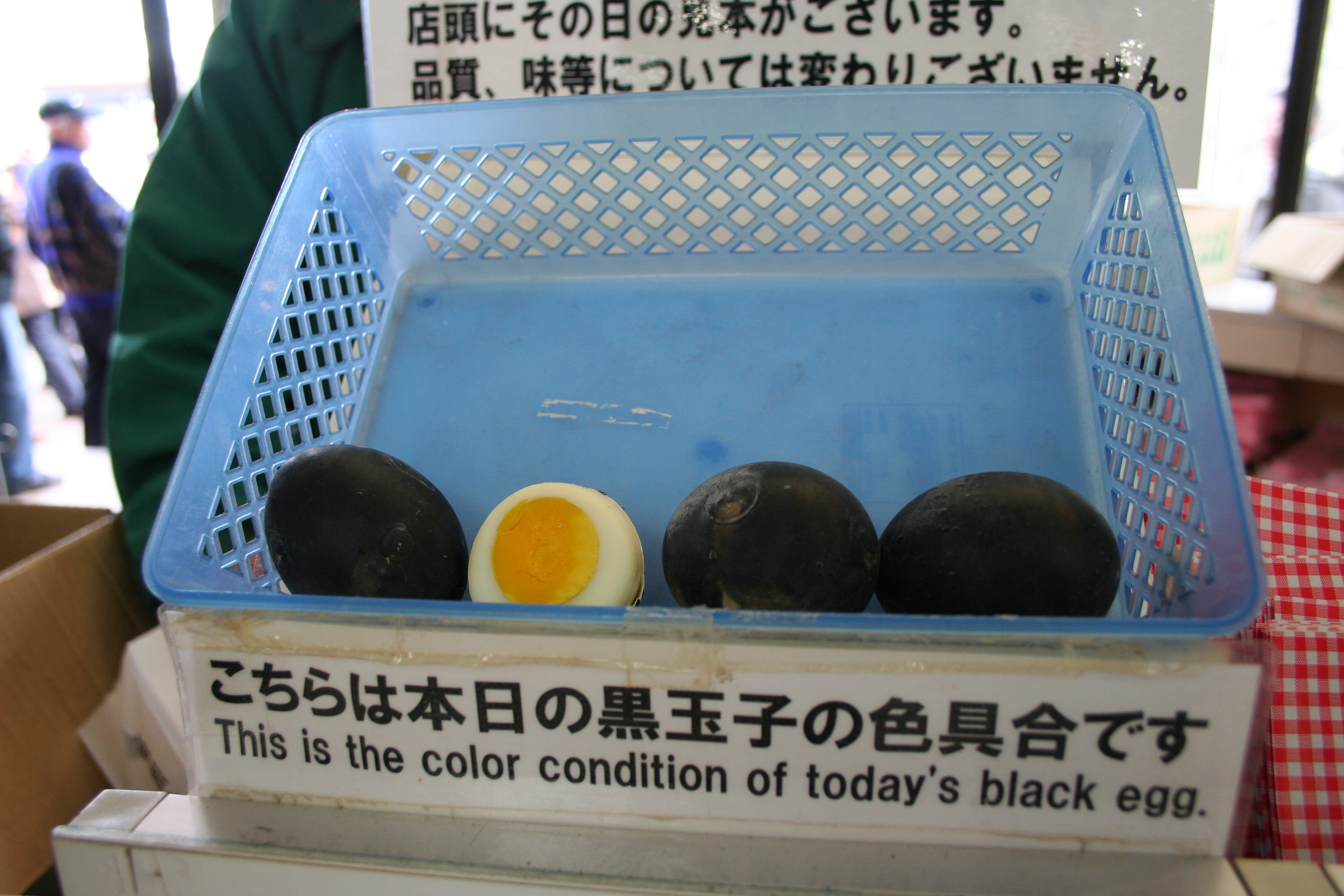
Onsen tamago (black egg) Miyanoshita Onsen

- Arima Onsen, Kobe, Hyōgo
- Asamushi Onsen, Aomori Prefecture
- Atami Onsen, Atami, Shizuoka, major onsen resort town near Tokyo
- Awara Onsen, Awara, Fukui Prefecture
- Awazu Onsen, Komatsu, Ishikawa
- Beppu Onsen, Beppu, Ōita Prefecture, famous for its multi-coloured springs
- Dake Onsen, Nihonmatsu, Fukushima
- Dōgo Onsen, Ehime Prefecture
- Funaoka Onsen, Kyoto
- Gero Onsen, Gero, Gifu, famous for its free open bath on riverbank of Hida River
- Geto Onsen, Iwate Prefecture
- Ginzan Onsen, Obanazawa, Yamagata
- Hirayu Onsen, Takayama, Gifu
- Hokkawa Onsen, Shizuoka
- Ibusuki Onsen, Kagoshima Prefecture
- Iizaka Onsen, Fukushima
- Ikaho Onsen, Ikaho, Gunma
- Iwaki Yumoto Onsen, Fukushima Prefecture
- Jigokudani, Nagano Prefecture
- Jōzankei Onsen, Hokkaido
- Kaike Onsen, Yonago, Tottori
- Kakeyu Onsen, Nagano
- Kanzanji Onsen, Shizuoka
- Katayamazu Onsen, Kaga, Ishikawa
- Kawayu Onsen, Tanabe, Wakayama
- Kindaichi Onsen, Iwate
- Kinugawa Onsen, Tochigi
- Kusatsu Onsen, Gunma Prefecture
- Misasa Onsen, Misasa, Tottori Prefecture
- Nagaragawa Onsen, Gifu, Gifu
- Nanki-Katsuura Onsen, Nachikatsuura, Wakayama
- Nanki-Shirahama Onsen, Shirahama, Wakayama Prefecture
- Nuruyu Onsen, Kumamoto Prefecture
- Nyūtō Onsen, Akita Prefecture
- Obama Onsen, Nagasaki Prefecture, the hottest Japanese hot spring (105 °C or 221 °F)
- Onneyu Onsen, Hokkaido
- Ōfuka Onsen, Akita
- Ryujin Onsen, Tanabe, Wakayama, one of Japan's famous three beautifying onsen
- Sabakoyu Onsen, Fukushima Prefecture, the oldest community onsen in Japan
- Sakunami Onsen, Miyagi
- Senami Onsen, Niigata Prefecture
- Shima Onsen, Gunma Prefecture
- Shimobe Onsen, Yamanashi Prefecture
- Shiobara Onsen, Tochigi Prefecture
- Shuzenji Onsen, Shizuoka Prefecture
- Sōunkyo Onsen, Hokkaido
- Sukayu Onsen, Aomori Prefecture
- Sumatakyō Onsen, Shizuoka Prefecture
- Takanoyu Onsen, Akita Prefecture
- Tsubame Onsen, Niigata - famous for its free open mixed onsen
- Tsuchiyu Onsen, Fukushima Prefecture
- Tsukioka Onsen, Niigata, Niigata Prefecture
- Tsurumaki Onsen, Kanagawa
- Unazuki Onsen, Kurobe, Toyama Prefecture
- Wakura Onsen, Nanao, Ishikawa Prefecture
- Yamanaka Onsen, Kaga, Ishikawa
- Yamashiro Onsen, Kaga, Ishikawa
- Yubara Onsen, Okayama Prefecture, one of the largest mixed baths at the foot of Yubara dam
- Yudanaka Onsen, Nagano Prefecture
- Yufuin Onsen, Ōita Prefecture
- Yumura Onsen, (Shin'onsen, Hyōgo)
- Yunogo Onsen, Okayama Prefecture
- Yunokawa Onsen, Hokkaido
- Yunomine Onsen, Tanabe, Wakayama, site of the UNESCO World Heritage Tsuboyu bath
- Zaō Onsen, Yamagata Prefecture

== See also ==
- Ashiyu
- Balneotherapy
- Furo
- List of hot springs in Japan
- Public bathing
- Sauna
- Taiwanese hot springs
- Three Ancient Springs
- Victorian Turkish baths
- Onsen portal at the Japanese Wikipedia (in Japanese)
