= Ashiyu =

Japanese or Taiwanese public bath for bathing feet

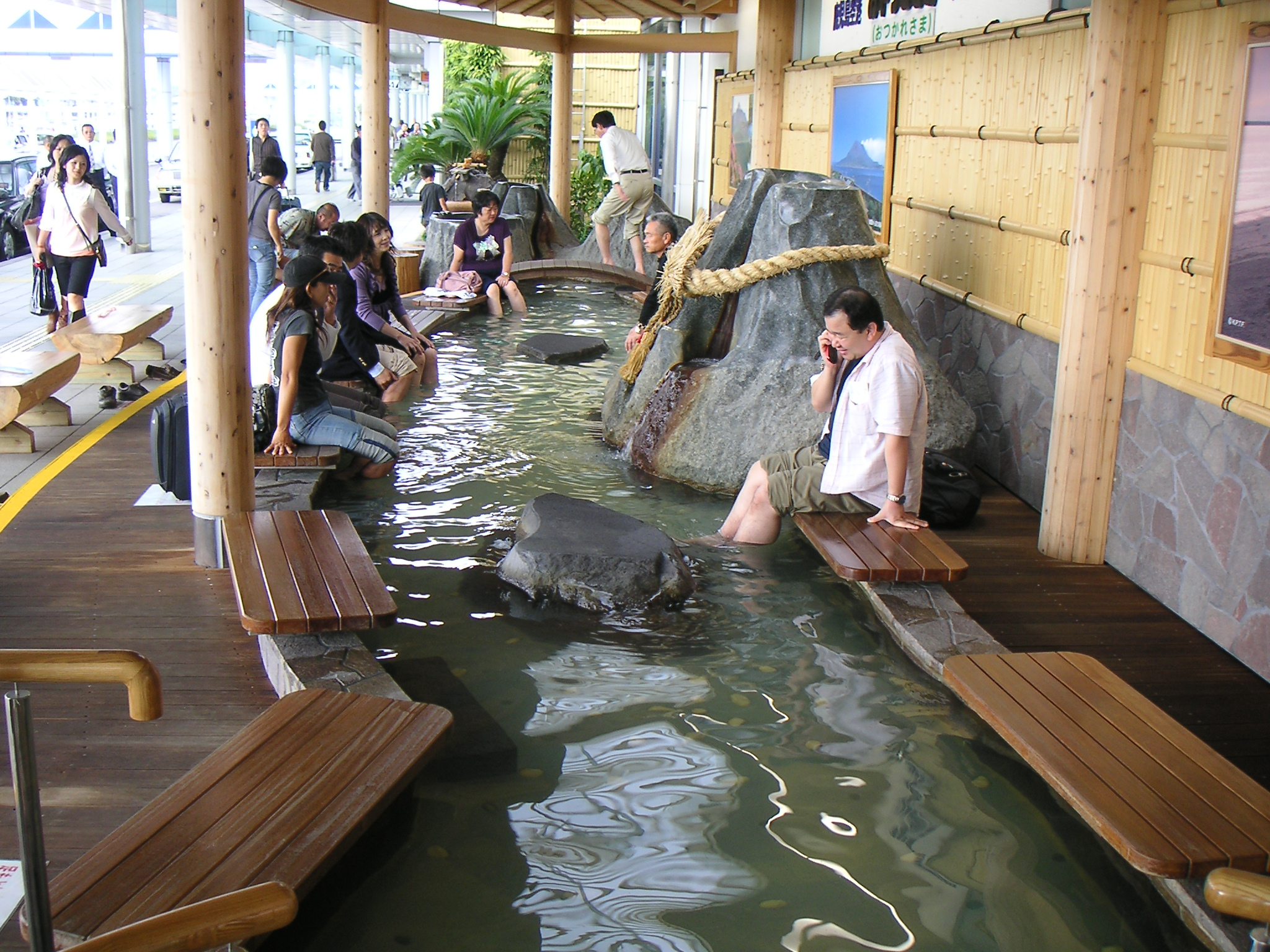
An ashiyu at Kagoshima Airport

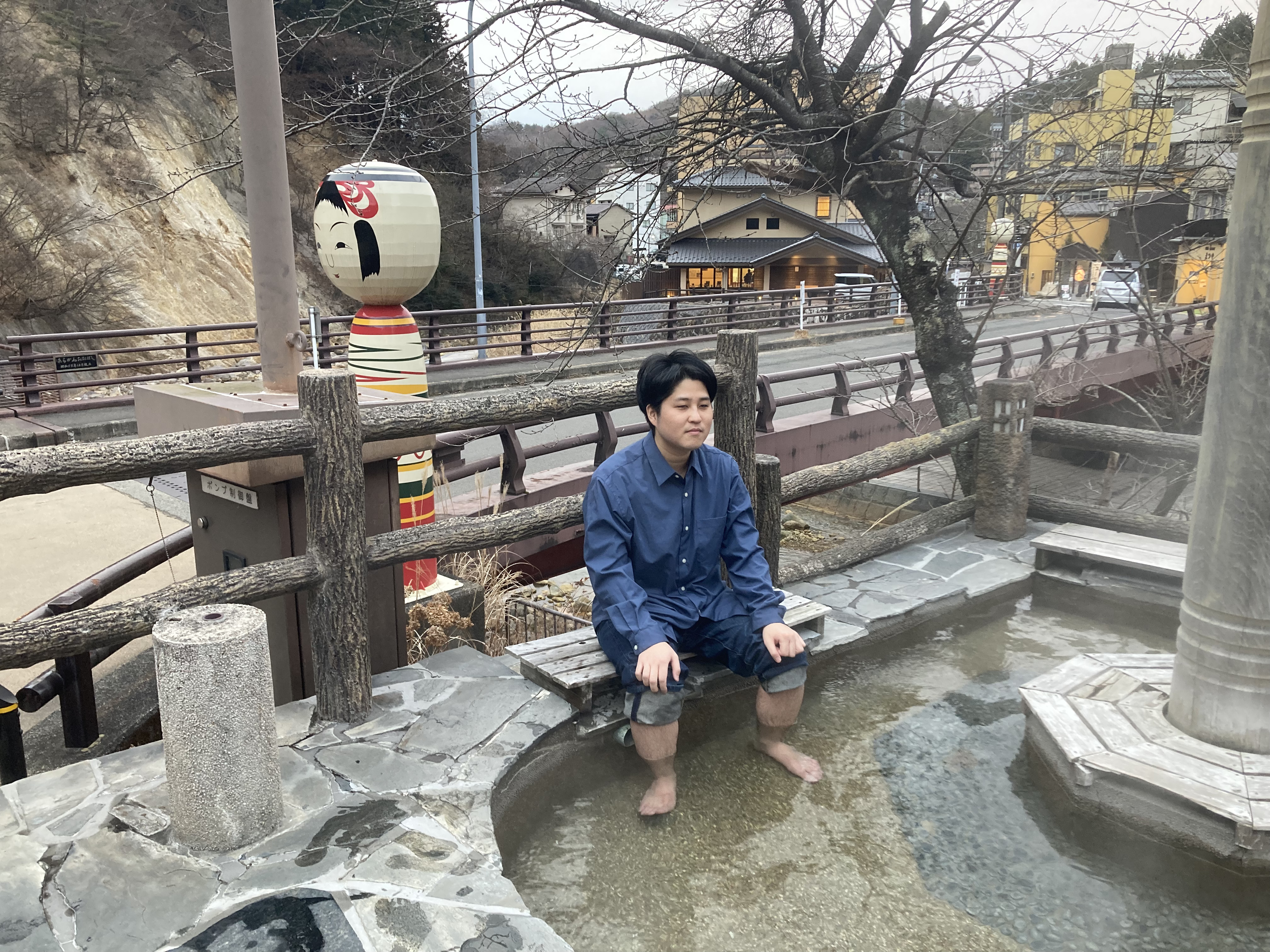
An ashiyu at Tsuchiyu Onsen

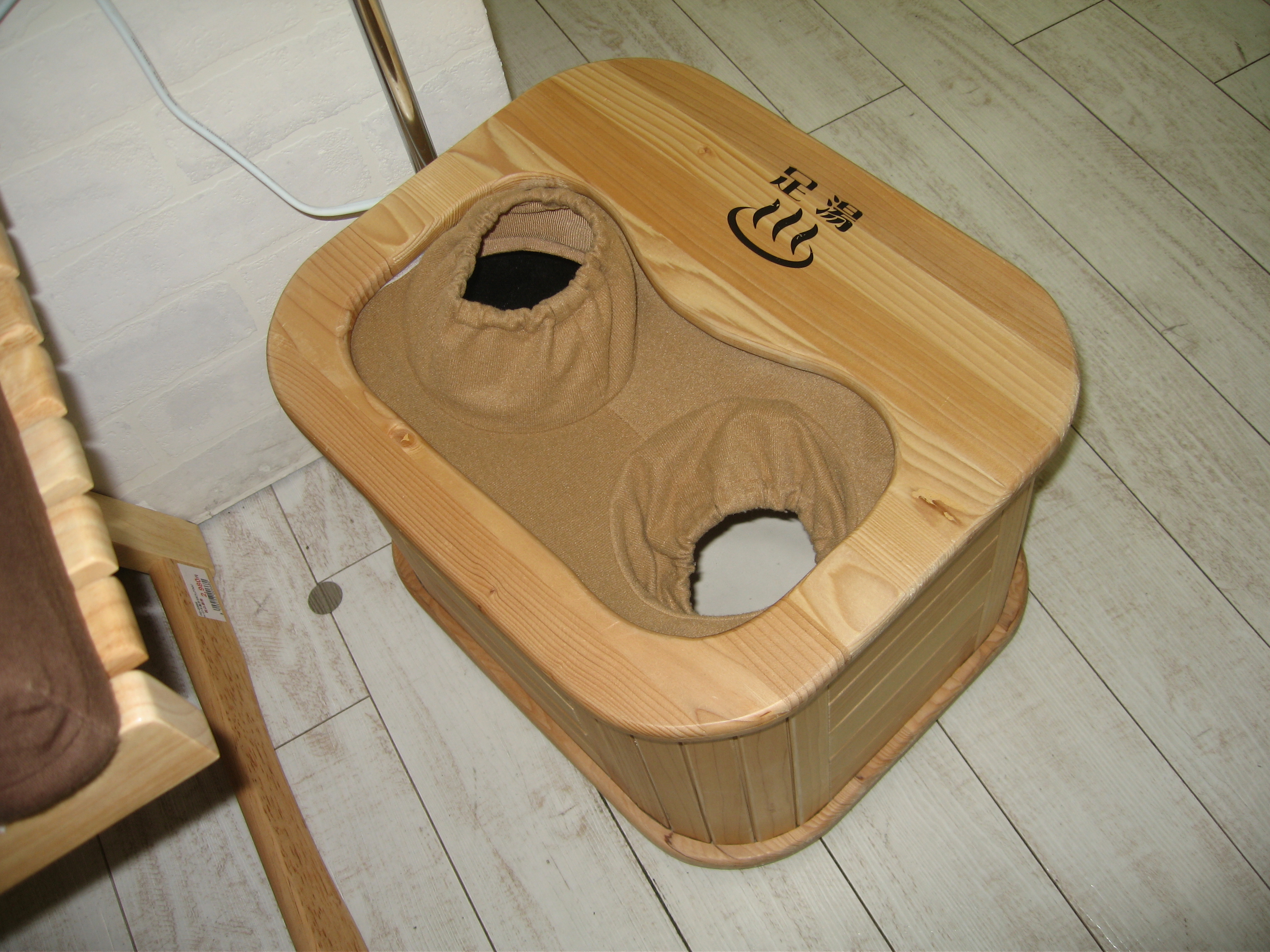
An electric ashiyu foot bath sold in a department store

An ashiyu (足湯) is a Japanese or Taiwanese public bath in which people can bathe their feet. The majority of ashiyu are free.

== Overview ==
The term ashiyu is a combination of the two characters "ashi" 足 meaning "foot", and "yu" 湯 meaning "hot water".

Many ashiyu are set up on street corners in towns with hot springs (onsen). People can easily enjoy them without having to remove all their clothing. They can also be found at railway stations, rest areas, and parks; some are located to serve hikers or walkers on pilgrimages. Whilst most foot baths are free of charge, at some private places a small donation under 100 yen for upkeep is preferred.

An ashiyu is different from a normal hot spring. At a hot spring, the entire body is immersed in the water; at an "ashiyu" (foot bath), however, only the feet and legs up to the knees are immersed. Despite this difference, a foot bath can still warm the entire body because of the large veins that run through the legs. Before using a footbath, shoes and socks must be removed. Rolling up pants to the knees is also a common practice. However, unlike a hot spring where washing the body with soap before entering the bath is a requirement, this is not required at a foot bath. There are foot baths with changing rooms, but they are extremely rare. In some places, a part of the ashiyu can be used to soak the hands "teyu" (hand bath).

At Kannawa Hot Spring's "Steam Foot Bath" in Oita Prefecture, and Sukayu Hot Spring's "Manjufukashi" in Aomori Prefecture, the steam from the hot spring is used to warm the body.
