= Nyūtō Onsen =

Hot springs resort in Akita Prefecture, Japan

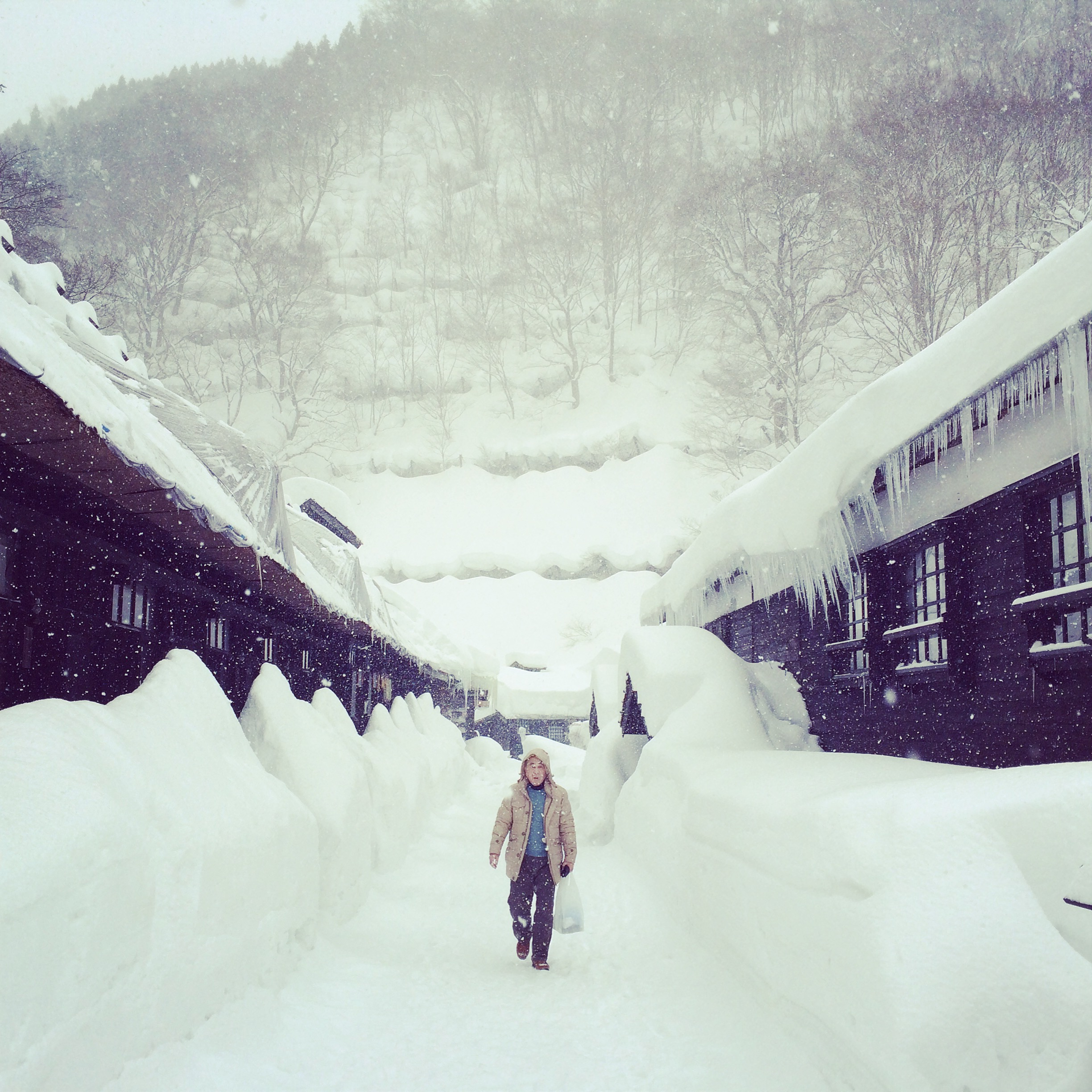
Walkway in Tsuru-no-yu Onsen in winter.

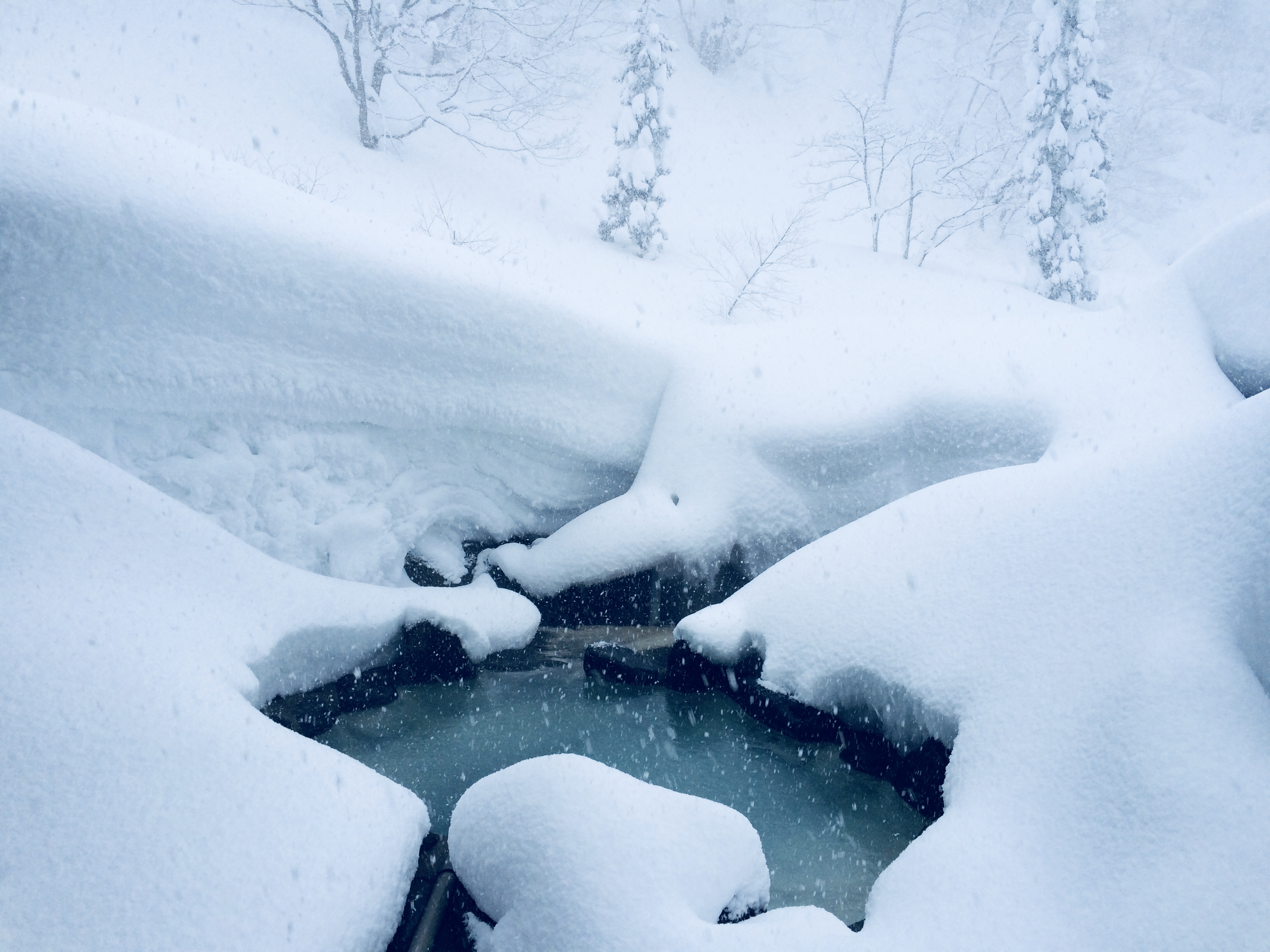
Outdoor bath of Magoroku Onsen in winter.

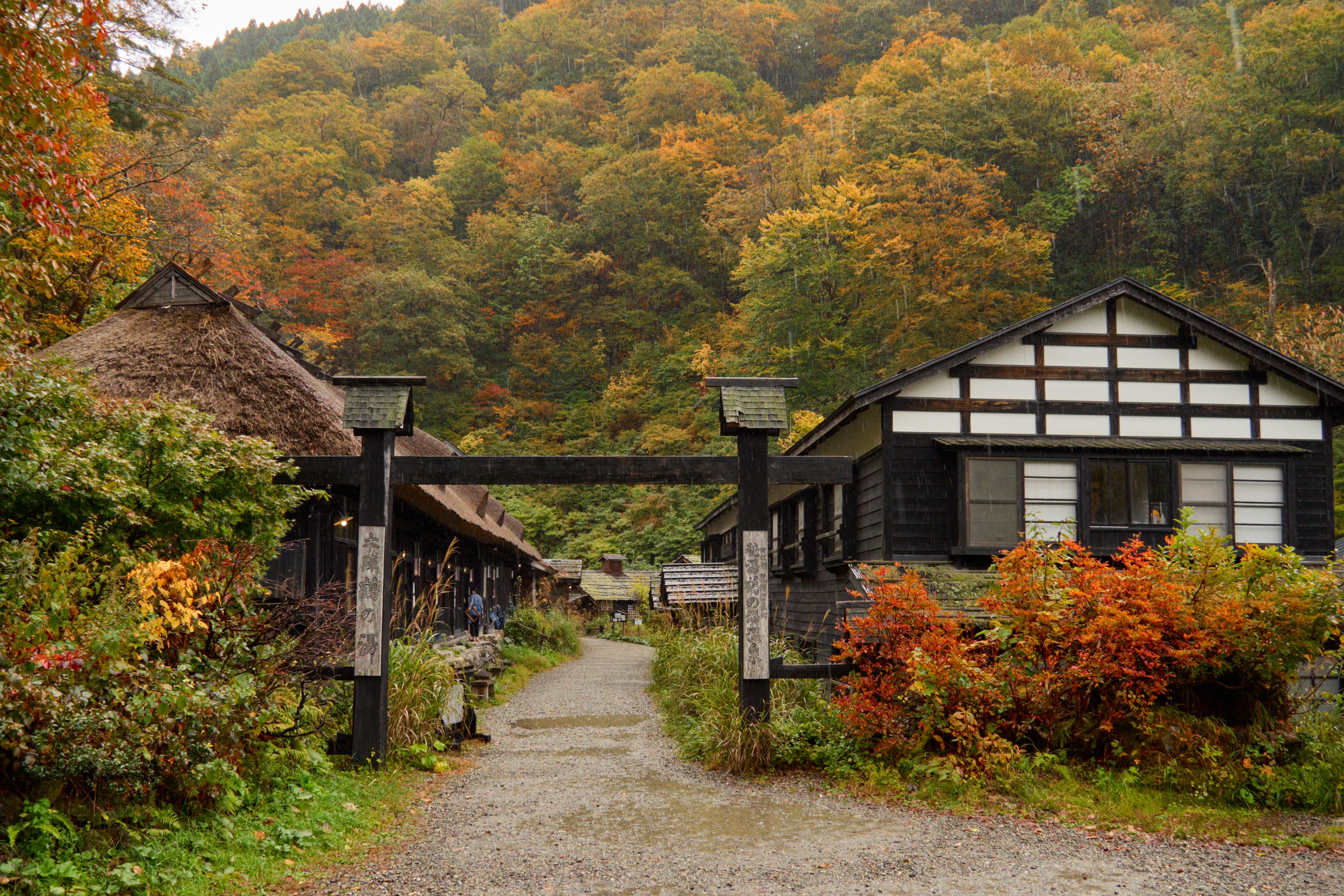
Entrance to Tsuru-no-yu in autumn

Nyūtō Onsen (乳頭温泉郷 にゅうとうおんせんきょう Nyūtō-onsen-kyō) is a rural hot spring resort in Towada-Hachimantai National Park, Semboku City, Akita Prefecture, Japan and consists of Japanese-style hot spring spas scattered around the base of Mount Nyūtō.

Nyūtō Onsen is composed of seven separate accommodation facilities and a free outdoor natural hot spring (noya) known as Ippon-matsu Onsen is on the trail of Mount Nyūtō. The site formerly hosted accommodation facilities and changing rooms which are no longer present; the spring itself remains accessible to hikers.

Visitors can purchase a pass known as a yumeguri-chō which grants single-entry access to the baths of each of the inns in the Nyūtō Onsen locality. It can only be purchased by guests of an inn or the hotel. The pass is valid for one year.

== Transportation ==
- Rail and bus: Nyūtō Onsen is serviced by buses on the Nyūtō Line departing from Tazawako Station on the Tazawako Line of the Akita Shinkansen. Buses are operated by Ugo Kotsu and the trip from Tazawako Station costs ¥800 and takes approximately 55 minutes. Ganiba Onsen is accessible from the last stop on the line, Nyūtō Ganiba Onsen. Tsuru-no-yu is accessible by changing to a courtesy shuttle bus at Arupa Komakusa (for staying guests only) or alternatively on foot (approx. 45 min) from Tsuru-no-yu Onsen Iriguchi bus stop. The Nyūtō Line runs via Lake Tazawa, another popular amenity in the area.
- By car: Accessible using National Highway Route 341, Akita Prefectural Road Route 127 Komagatake Line and Akita Prefectural Road Route 194 Obonai Line.
- By plane: Via Akita Airportliner departing from Akita Airport.

== Local hot springs ==
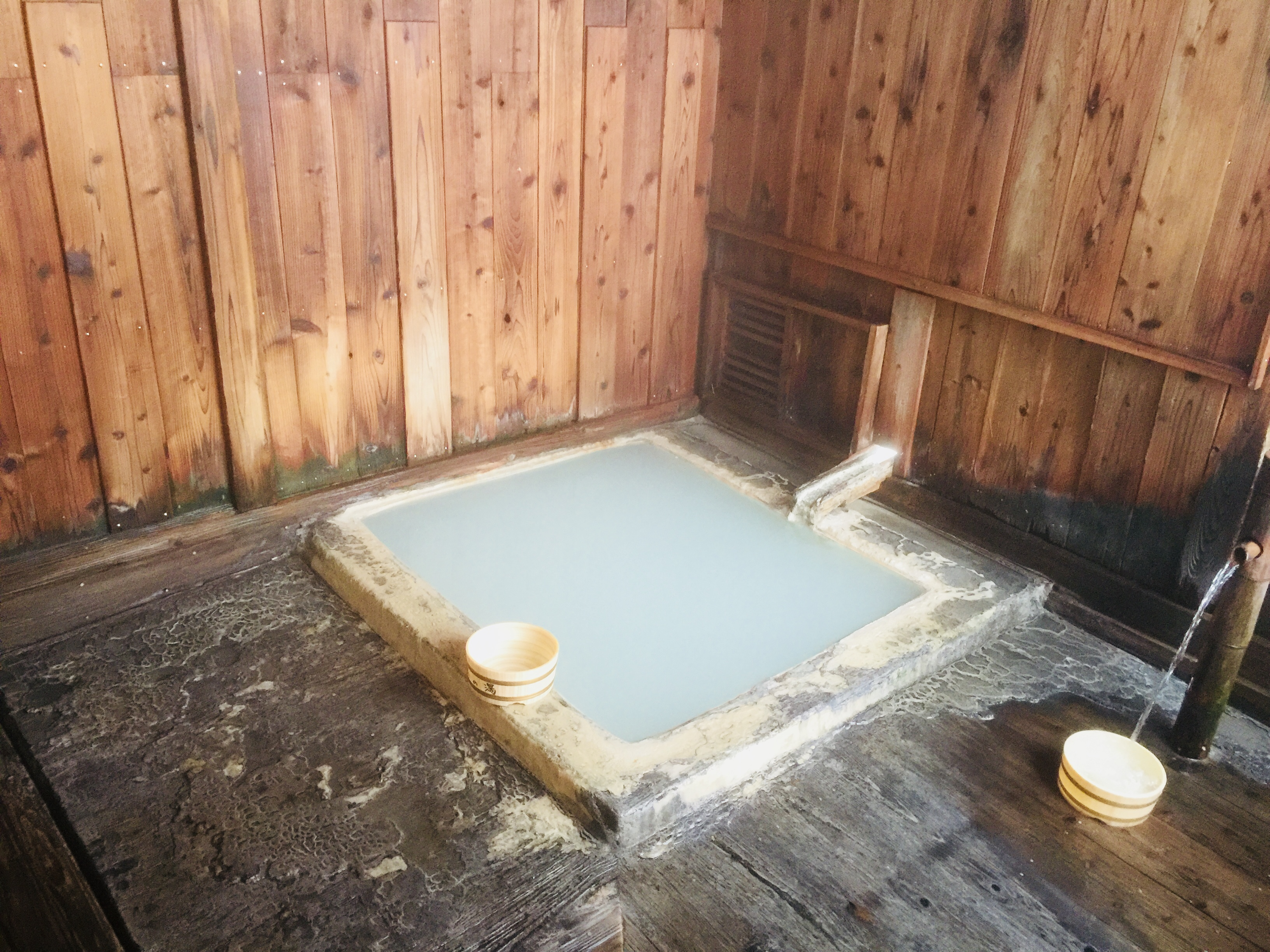
A small indoor bath at Tsuru-no-yu Onsen

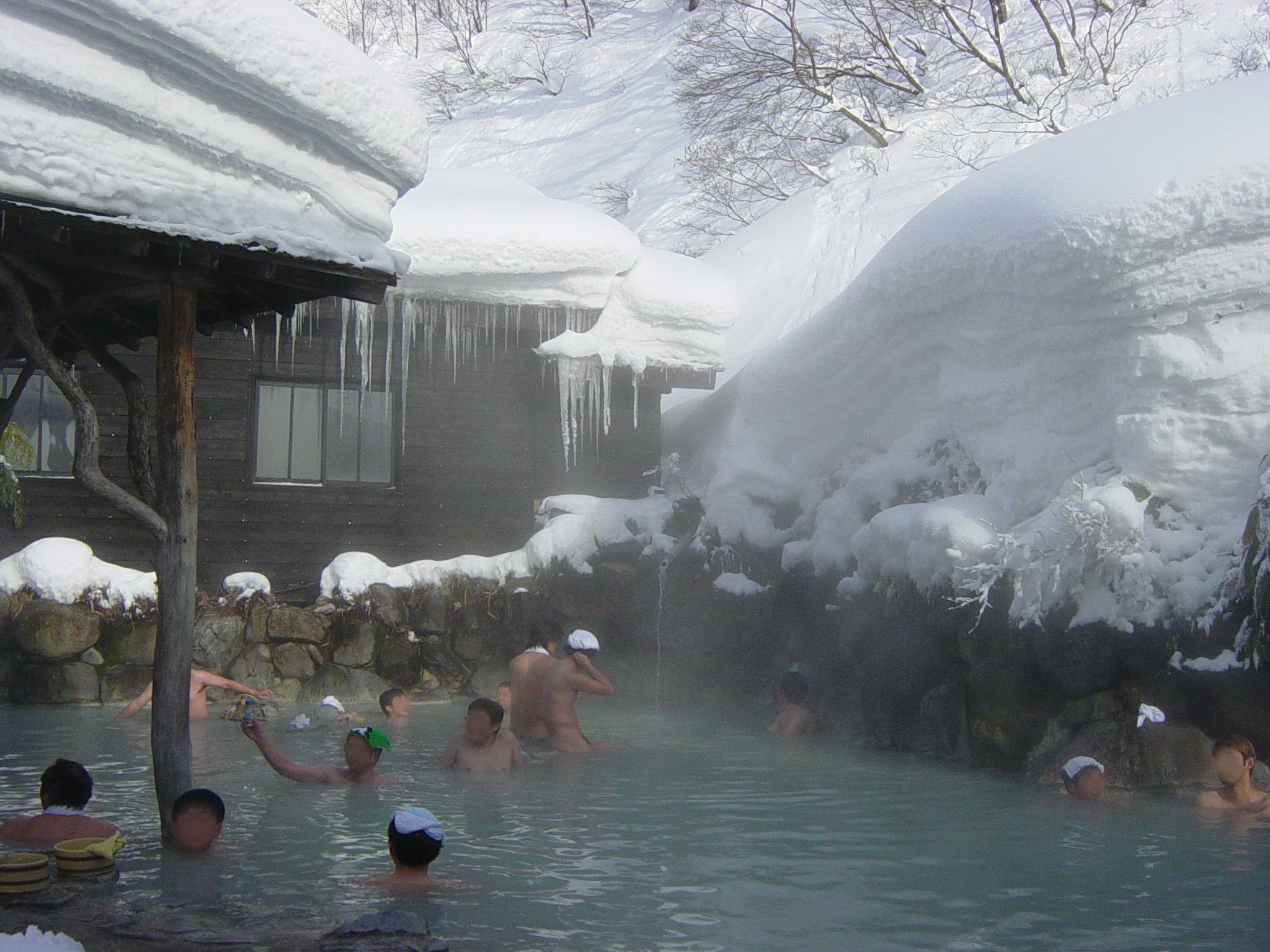
The main open-air bath at Tsuru-no-yu Onsen

- Tsuru-no-yu Onsen: Accessible on foot via Tsuru-no-yu Iriguchi bus stop. The inn is several kilometers from the bus stop and is distant from the other inns.
- Ōgama Onsen: On Akita Prefectural Road Route 194
- Tae-no-yu Onsen: On Akita Prefectural Road Route 194
- Ganiba Onsen: At the starting point of Akita Prefectural Road Route 194
- Magoroku Onsen: Off Akita Prefectural Road Route 194, approximately 1 km from Ōgama Onsen
- Kuroyu Onsen: Located off Akita Prefectural Road Route 194, approximately 1 km from Nyūtō Onsen-kyō Kyūka-mura Hotel. Closed in winter.
- Nyūtō Onsen-kyō Kyūka-mura Hotel: On Akita Prefectural Road Route 194

== Related items ==
- Onsen
- Sentō
- Furo
- Ryokan
- Lake Tazawa
