= Girl Crush (manga) =

Japanese Manga series

- Cover of the first volume, featuring Tenka Momose

ガールクラッシュ (Gāru Kurasshu)
- Genre: Coming-of-age
- Manga
- Written by: Midori Tayama
- Published by: Shinchosha
- English publisher: NA: Comikey (digital); Viz Media
- Imprint: Bunch Comics
- Magazine: Comic Nicola
- Original run: November 20, 2020 – present
- Volumes: 9 (ebook); 5 (print)
- Anime television series
- Studio: Enishiya
- Original network: TBS

Girl Crush (Japanese: ガールクラッシュ, Hepburn: Gāru Kurasshu) is a Japanese manga series written and illustrated by Midori Tayama. It began serialization on the Line Manga website under Shinchosha's Comic Nicola brand in November 2020. An anime television series adaptation produced by Enishiya has been announced.

== Synopsis ==
The manga centers around a popular girl named Tenka Momose, a high school student who is successful at everything aside from finding love. One day, she befriends Erian Satou, a dorky girl. Both end up going to South Korea and enter the K-pop industry.

== Media ==
=== Manga ===
Written and illustrated by Midori Tayama, Girl Crush began serialization on the Line Manga website under Shinchosha's Comic Nicola brand on November 20, 2020. The series' chapters have been collected into nine ebook volumes as of December 2025. Shinchosha began releasing print copies with the first two volumes in April 2025, and the third volume in June 2025. The series is licensed in English by Comikey.

In October 2024, Viz Media announced that they would begin releasing volumes of the series in Q3 2025.

No.	Original release date	Original ISBN	English release date	English ISBN
1	May 21, 2021 (ebook); April 9, 2025 (print)	978-4-10-772768-8	June 10, 2025	978-1-9747-5585-1
2	September 21, 2021 (ebook); April 9, 2025 (print)	978-4-10-772769-5	August 12, 2025	978-1-9747-5610-0
3	February 9, 2022 (ebook); June 9, 2025 (print)	978-4-10-772841-8	October 21, 2025	978-1-9747-5799-2
4	June 9, 2022 (ebook); September 9, 2025 (print)	978-4-10-772865-4	December 9, 2025	978-1-9747-5858-6
5	November 9, 2022 (ebook); December 9, 2025 (print)	978-4-10-772892-0	February 10, 2026	978-1-9747-6207-1
6	May 9, 2023 (ebook); December 9, 2026 (print)	978-4-10-772927-9	April 14, 2026	978-1-9747-6208-8
7	October 6, 2023 (ebook)	—	June 9, 2026	978-1-9747-6363-4
8	July 9, 2024 (ebook)	—	August 11, 2026	978-1-9747-1679-1
9	December 9, 2025 (ebook)	—	February 9, 2027	978-1-9747-6961-2

=== Anime ===
An anime television series adaptation was announced on November 27, 2025. It will be produced by Enishiya and is set to air on TBS and other networks.

== Reception ==
The series was a prize winner in the "I Want to Deliver It to the World!" category at the 2nd Rakuten Kobo E-book Awards.

By April 2025, the series had over 500,000 copies in circulation. By November 2025, it had over 900,000 copies in circulation.

== See also ==
- Dusk Beyond the End of the World, an anime television series with original character designs by Midori Tayama
