= List of hot springs in Japan =

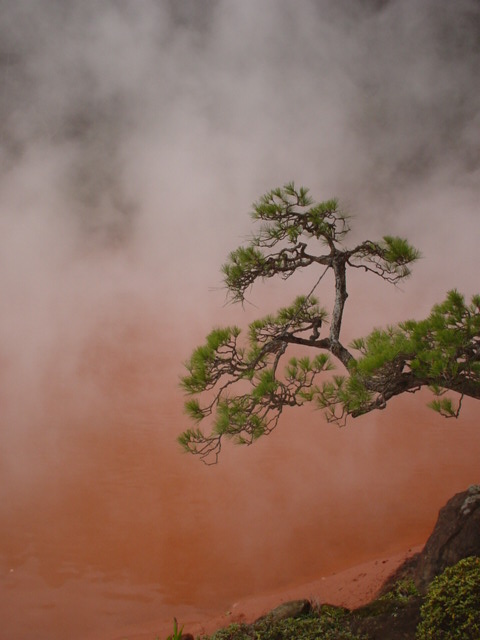
Natural iron hot spring, Beppu, Japan

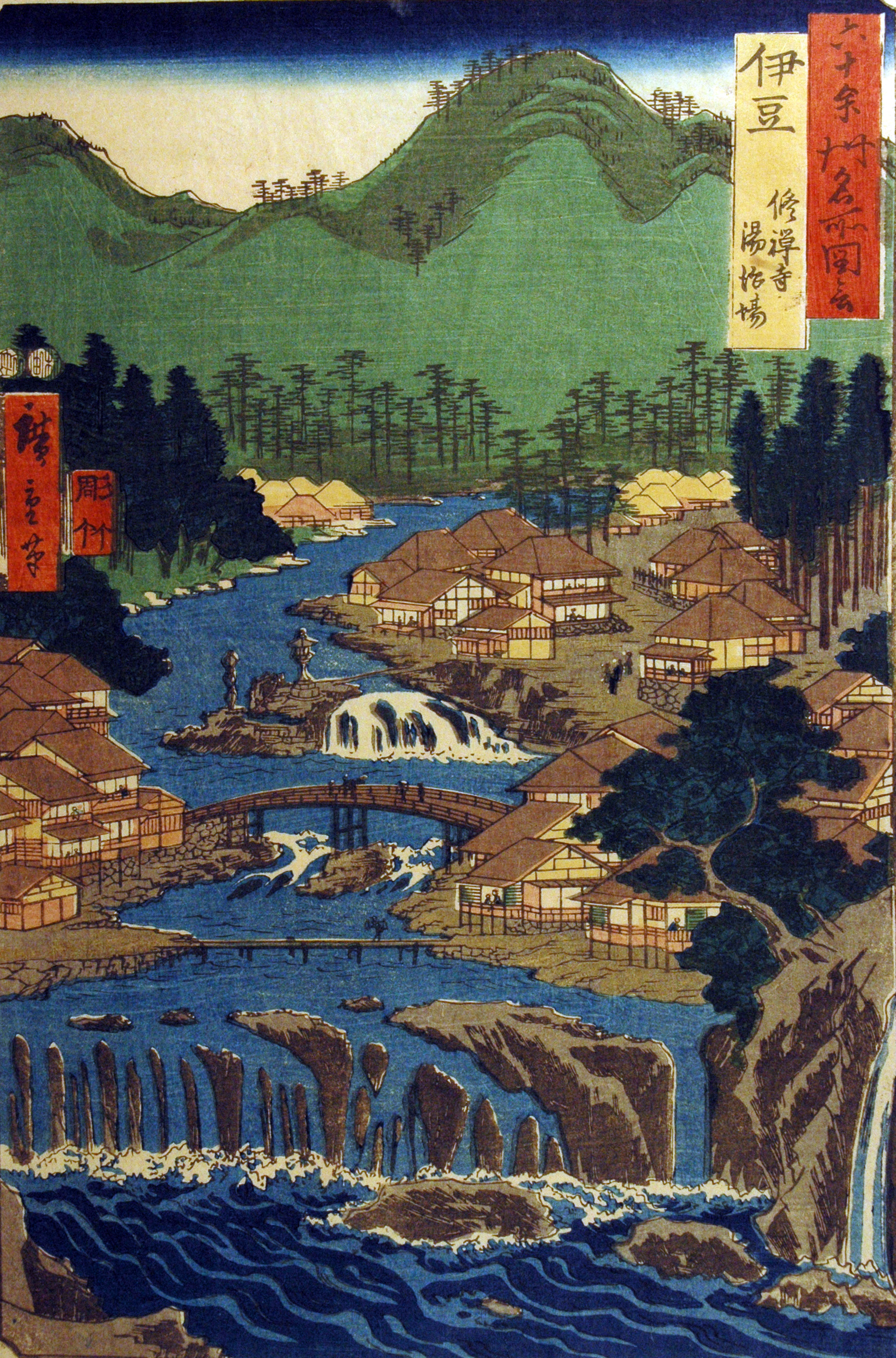
Izu Province, The Hot Springs of the Shuzen Temple woodcut by Utagawa Hiroshige

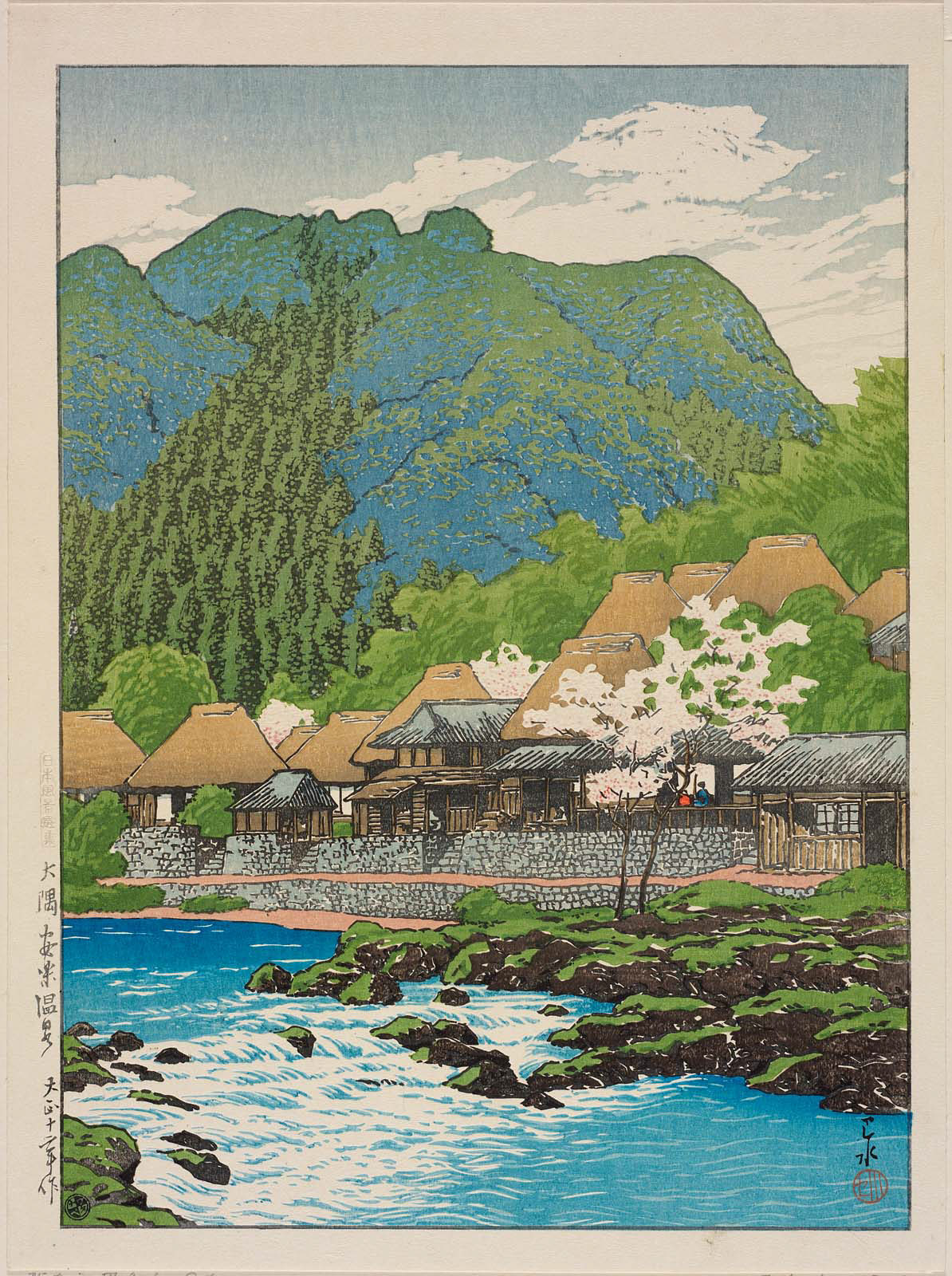
Nihon fūkei senshū, Ōsumi Anraku onsen by Kawase Hasui

This is a dynamic list of geothermal hot springs (onsen) as geological phenomena in Japan. This list is not for listing commercial establishments such as spa hotels, onsen ryokan, healing centers or other commercial establishments.

Japan has many geothermal spring systems as it is located in the Pacific Ring of Fire volcanic area. More than 27,000 hot spring sources exist in Japan, together they discharge over 2.6 million liters of water every minute.

These springs have played, and continue to play, an important role in Japanese culture throughout history. In Shinto, Sukunabikona is the kami of the hot springs. As the deity of hot springs Sukunabikona and Ōkuninushi went to the Dōgo hot springs. There Ōkuninushi put Sukunabikona in the hot spring water to heal him of an ailment. Upon awakening, Sukunabikona danced atop a stone. It is said that his footprints left impressions on the rock, known as Tamanoishi, which still exists at Dogo Onsen north of the main building.

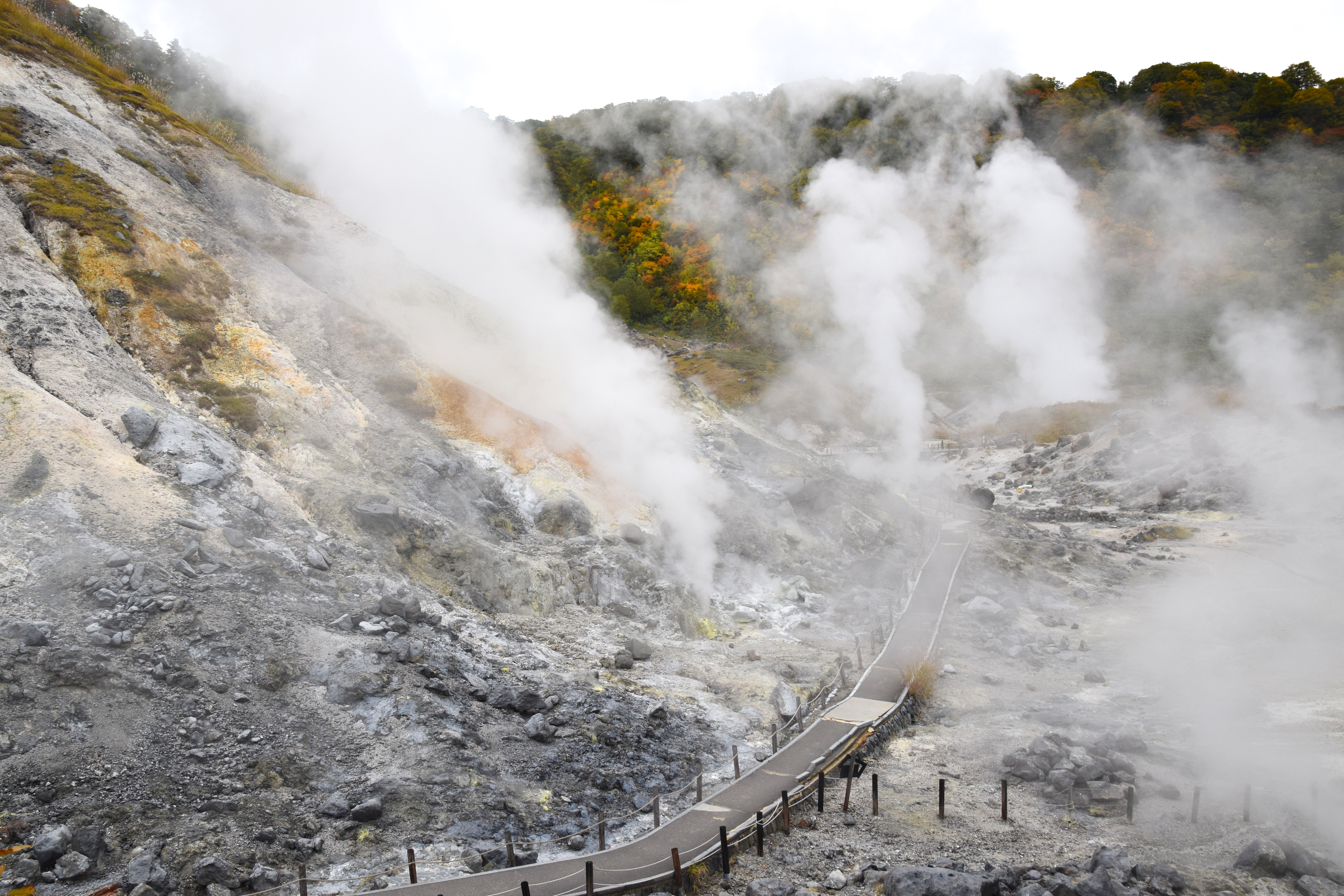
Tamagawa Onsen, Akita prefecture

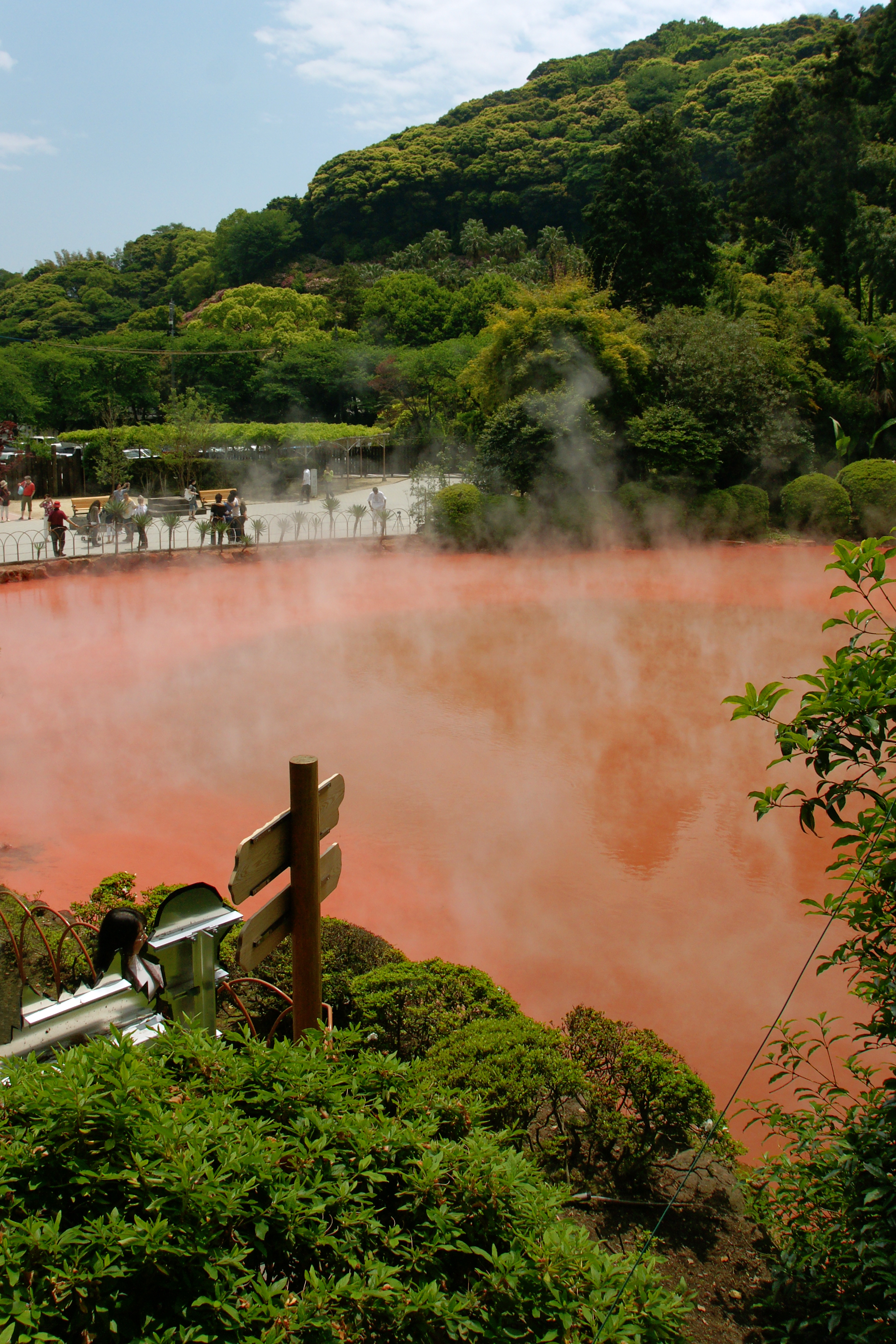
Beppu Chinoike-jigoku, Ōita prefecture

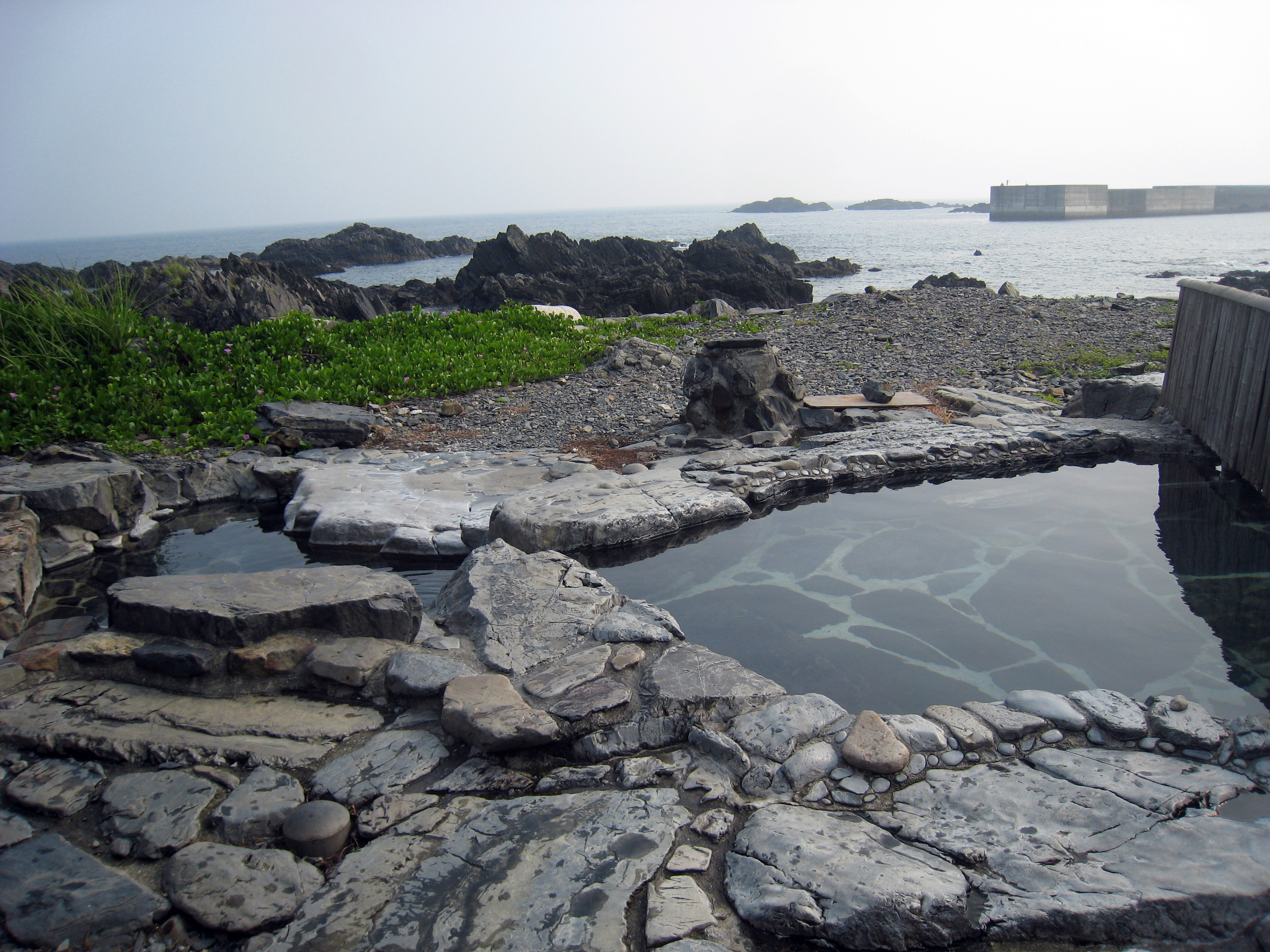
Yudomari seaside onsen, Kagoshima prefecture

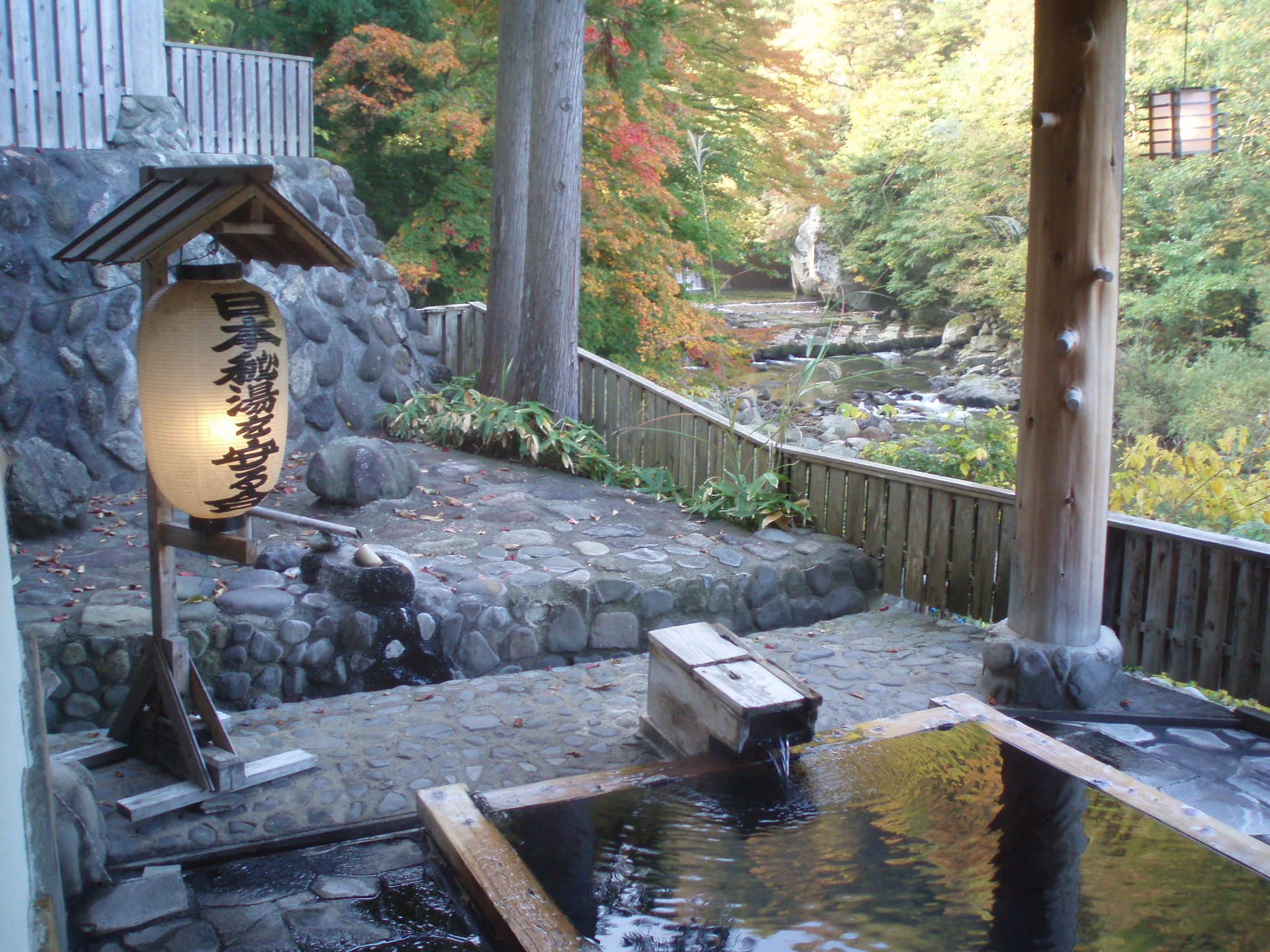
Takanoyu Onsen, Akita prefecture

== Akita Prefecture ==
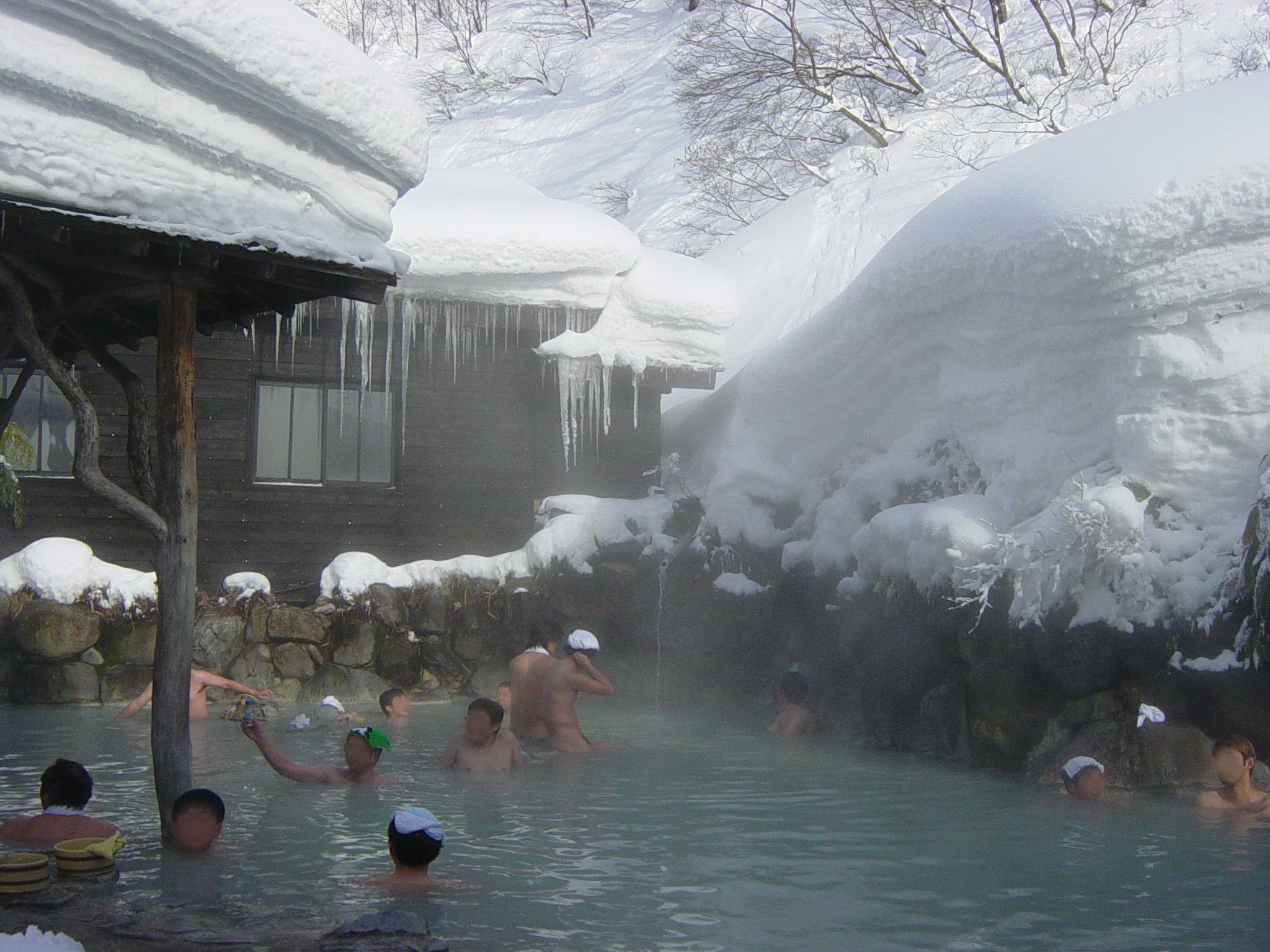
Winter bathing at Tsuru-no-yu roten-buro in Nyūtō, Akita

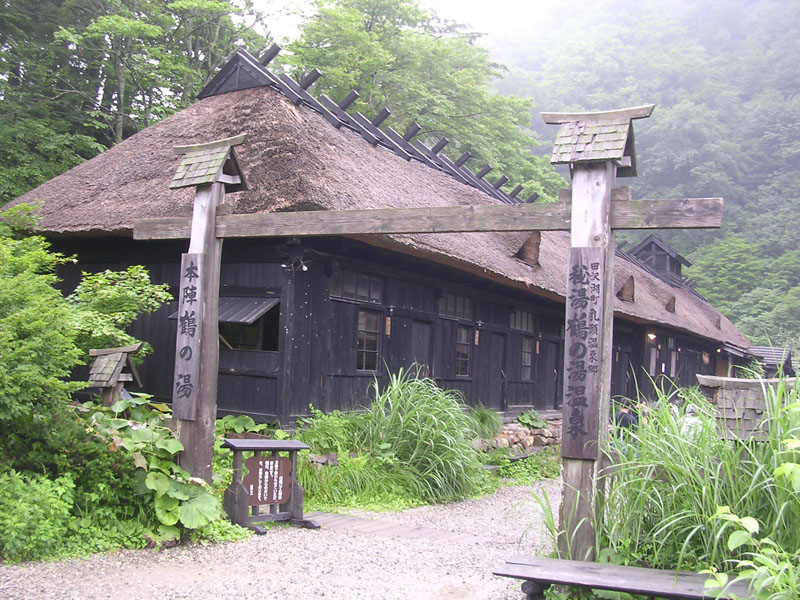
Old Tsuru-no-yu Bathhouse in Nyūtō Onsen area, Akita

- Akinomiya Hot Springs
- Nyūtō Onsen
- Ōfuka Onsen
- Takanoyu Onsen also known as Falcon's Hot Spring
- Tamagawa Hot Spring is tied (with Higashi Onsen in Kagoshima) for the highest acid content of all hot springs in Japan, at a PH value of 1.2.
- Tsurunoyu Onsen

== Aomori Prefecture ==
- Asamushi Onsen
- Furofushi Onsen
- Kappa-no-you Hot Spring
- Oku-yagen Hot Spring
- Sukayu Onsen
- Yagen Onsen

== Ehime Prefecture ==
- Dōgo Onsen was mentioned in the oldest collection of Japanese poetry, the Man’yo Wakashu.

== Fukui Prefecture ==
- Awara Onsen, Awara

== Fukushima Prefecture ==
- Dake Onsen, Nihonmatsu, Fukushima
- Iizaka Onsen
- Iwaki Yumoto Onsen
- Sabakoyu Onsen
- Takayu Onsen
- Tsuchiyu Onsen

== Gifu Prefecture ==
- Gero Onsen, Gero, Gifu, Hida River
- Hirayu Onsen, Takayama
- Nagaragawa Onsen

== Gunma Prefecture ==
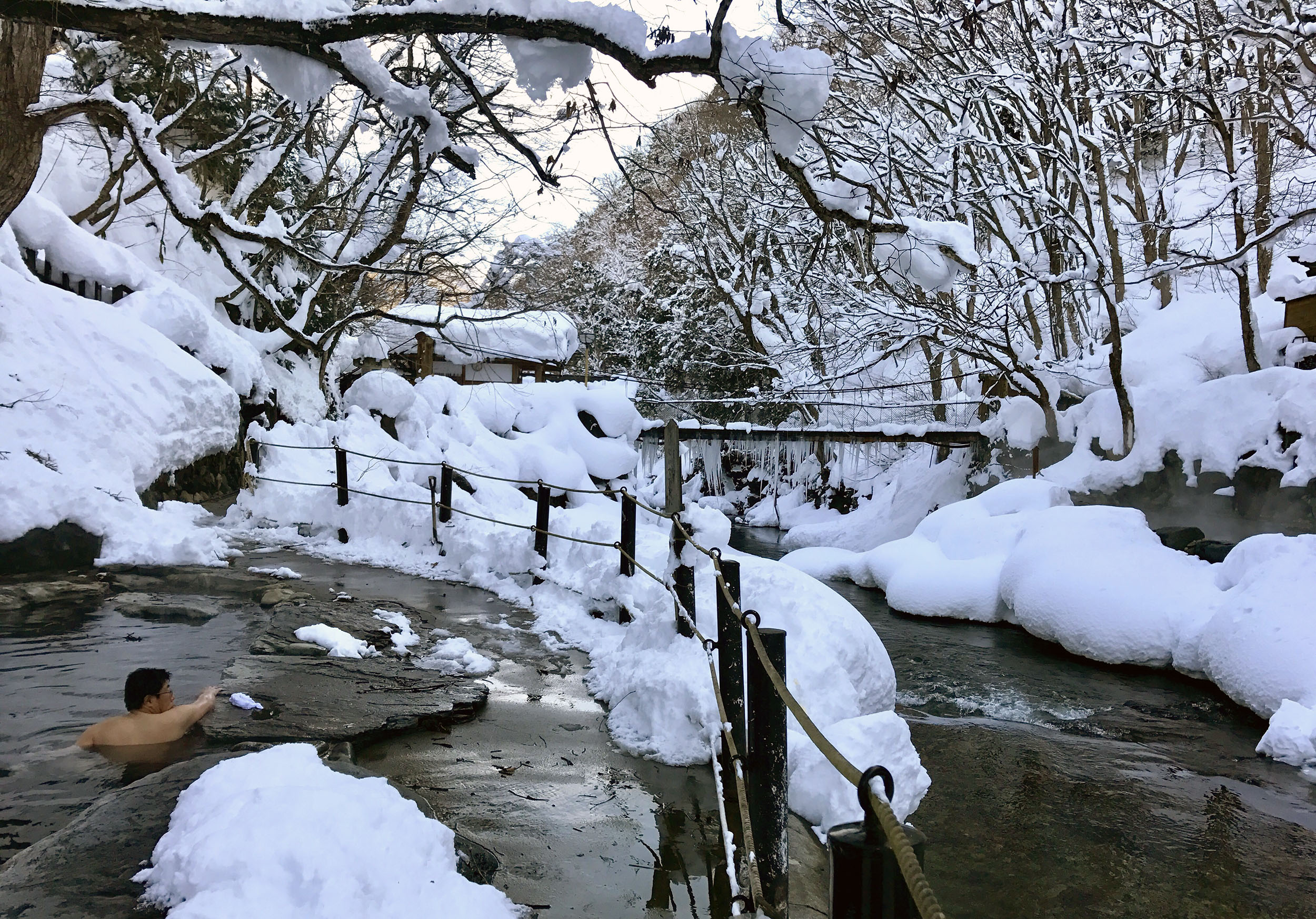
Takaragawa Onsen, Gunma

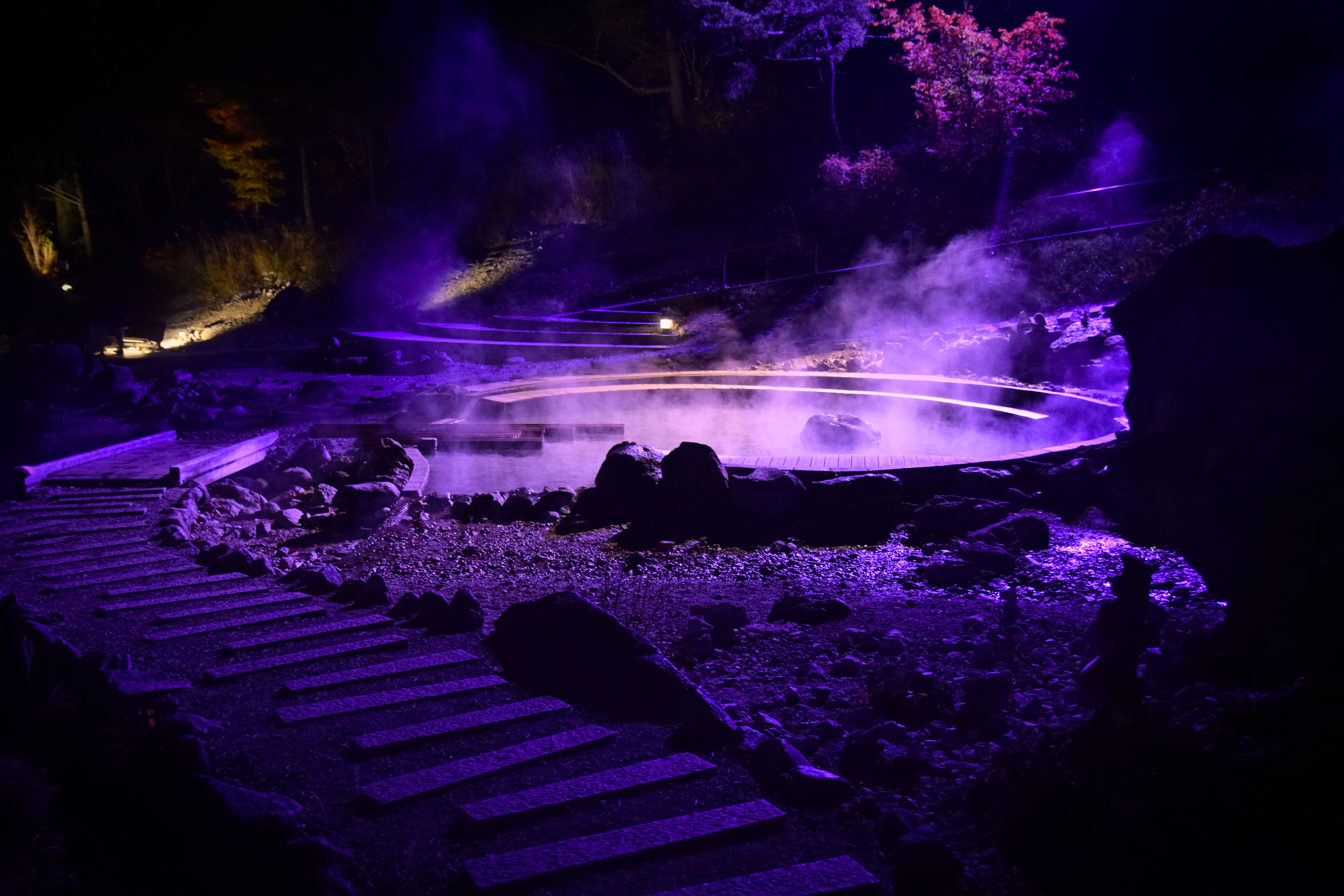
Kusatsu Onsen, Gunma Prefecture

- Akagi, Gunma
- Ikaho Onsen, Ikaho, a.k.a. Ikaho Onsen, Kogane-no-Yu (The Golden Waters), Kodakara-no-Yu (Child Waters)
- Kusatsu Onsen
- Sawatari Hot Springs
- Rosoku Onsen has the highest radium content in all of Japan., also known as Yunoshima Radium Kosen Hoyojo (Rosoku Onsen) (有限会社 湯之島ラジウム鉱泉保養所)
- Shima Onsen
- Takaragawa Onsen

== Hokkaido Prefecture ==
Hokkaido Prefecture has the third most hot springs with 2,304 registered. The hot springs in the prefecture have the second highest discharge rate of water at 260 kiloliters per minute.

- Asahidake Onsen
- Futamata
- Jōzankei Onsen
- Kamuiwakka Falls
- Noboribetsu Jigokudani, or Hell Valley, the main source of the Noboribetsu onsen
- Onneyu Onsen
- Onnetō Hot Falls
- Sōunkyo Onsen
- Tenninkyo Onsen
- Tōyako, Hokkaidō, Shikotsu-Toya National Park
- Yunokawa Onsen

== Hyōgo Prefecture ==
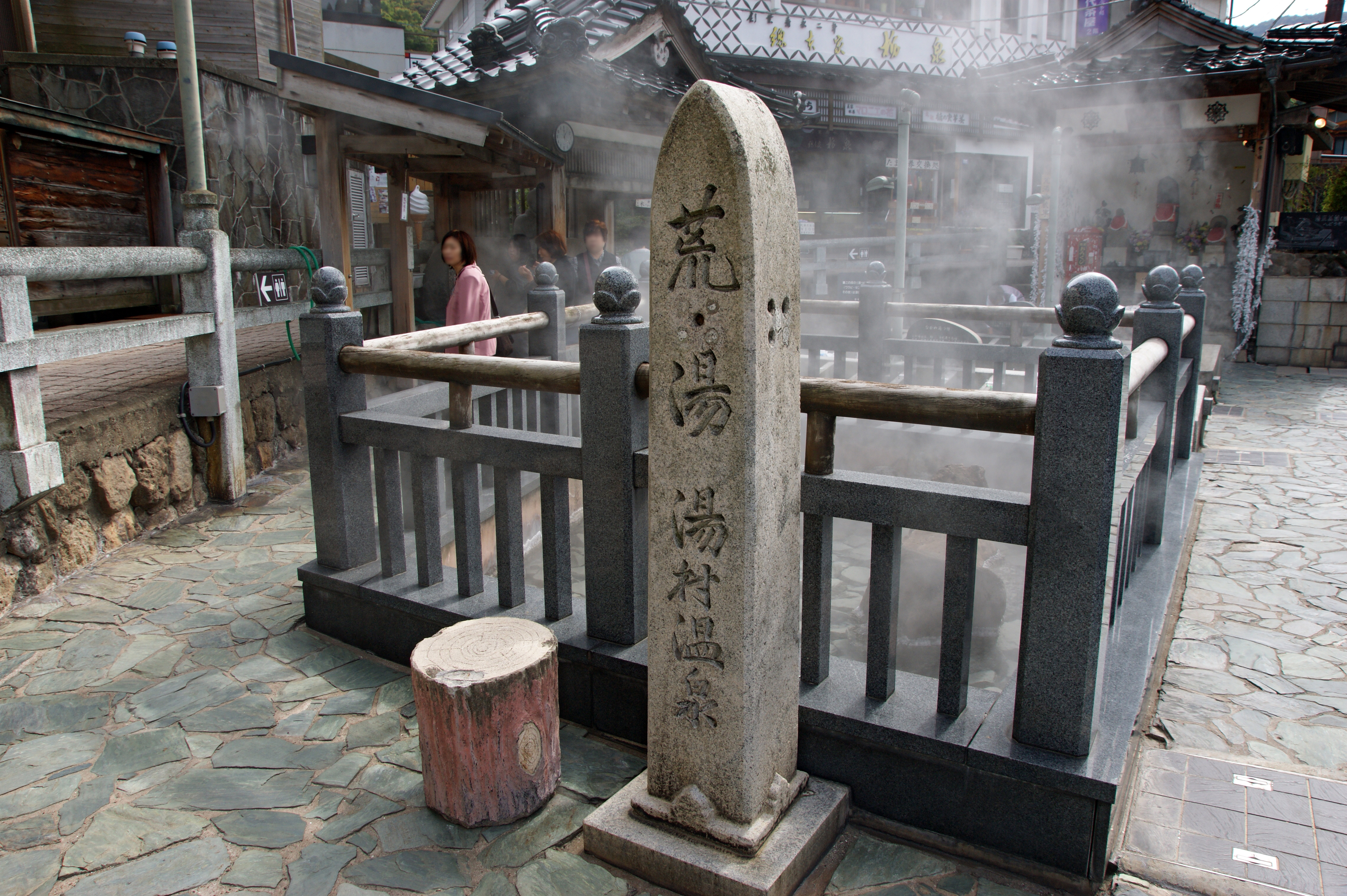
Yumura onsen

- Arima Onsen, Kobe, was mentioned in the Nihon Shoki, the second oldest account of the history of Japan (after the history presented in Kojiki)
- Kinosaki, Hyōgo
- Takarazuka, Hyōgo
- Yumura Onsen, (Shin'onsen, Hyōgo) Yumura Onsen has the hottest water in Japan with a temperature of 208.4 degrees Fahrenheit (98 degrees Celsius).

== Ishikawa Prefecture ==
- Awazu Onsen, Komatsu, Ishikawa
- Katayamazu Onsen, Kaga, Ishikawa
- Wakura Onsen, Nanao
- Yamanaka Onsen, Kaga
- Yamashiro Onsen, Kaga
- Yuwaku Onsen

== Iwate Prefecture ==
- Geto Onsen
- Hanamaki, Iwate
- Kindaichi Onsen

== Kagawa Prefecture ==
- Naoshima

== Kanagawa Prefecture ==
- Hakone, Kanagawa, near Tokyo. See also Ōwakudani
- Iiyama Onsen and one other hot spring (Tokigawa Onsen in Saitama Prefecture) are tied for the highest alkalinity in all of Japan.
- Miyanoshita Onsen
- Tsurumaki Onsen Tsurumaki Onsen has the highest calcium content in its waters of all the hot springs in Japan.
- Yugawara

== Kagoshima Prefecture ==
Kagoshima prefecture has the second most hot springs in Japan, with 2,824 registered. The hot springs systems in Kagoshima have the third highest discharge rate at 201 kiloliters per minute.

- Higashi Onsen and one other hot spring (Tamagawa Onsen in Akita) have the highest acidity content in its water at a PH value of 1.2, of all the hot springs in Japan.
- Ibusuki Onsen
- Kirishima

== Kyoto Prefecture ==
- Funaoka Onsen, Kyoto

== Kumamoto Prefecture ==
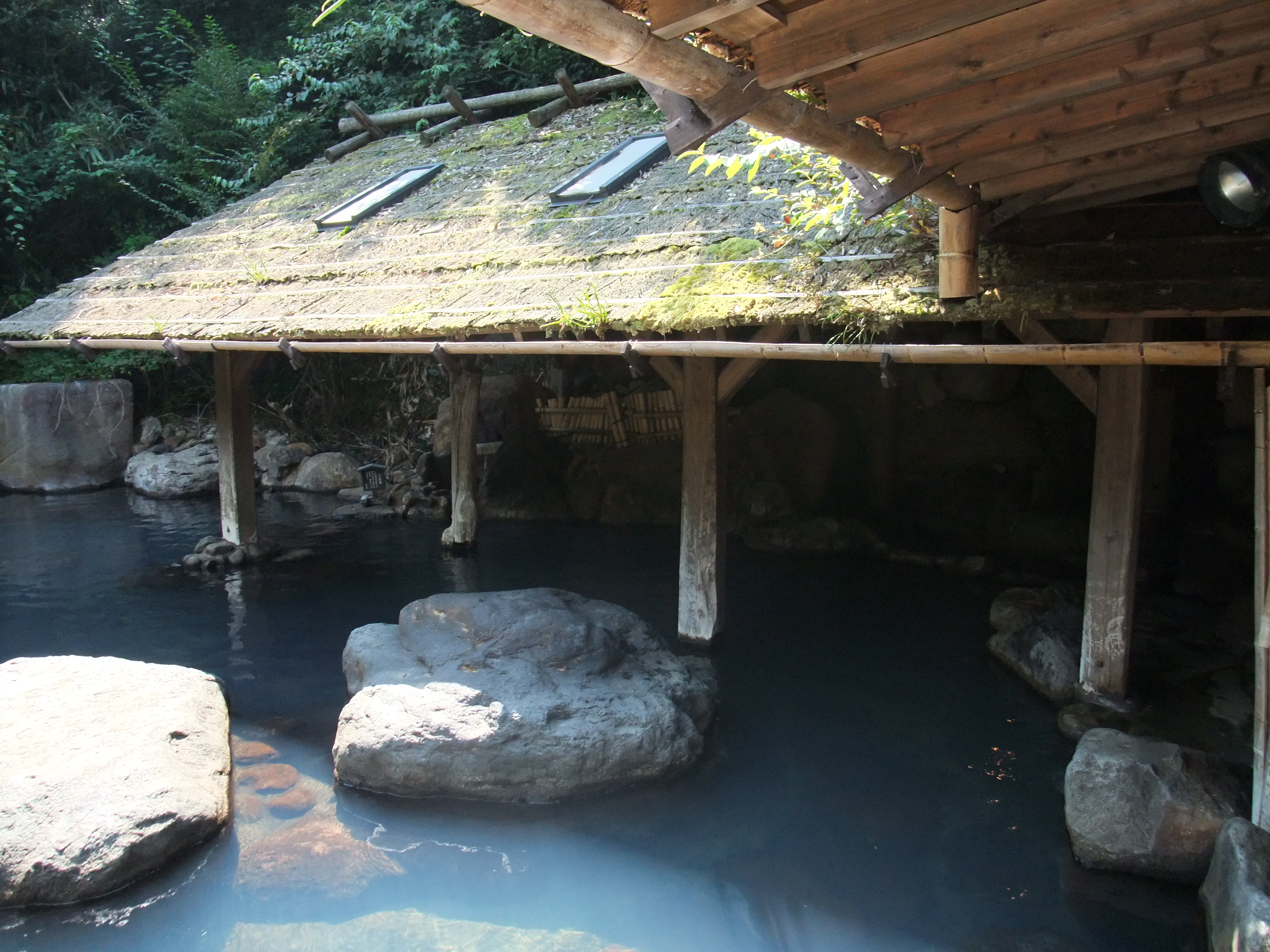
Kurokawa Onsen roten-buro in Kyushu

- Aso, Kumamoto, Mount Aso
- Kurokawa Onsen, Aso
- Nuruyu Onsen

== Mie Prefecture ==
- Yunoyama Onsen

== Miyagi Prefecture ==
- Naruko
- Sakan Onsen
- Sakunami Onsen

== Nagano Prefecture ==
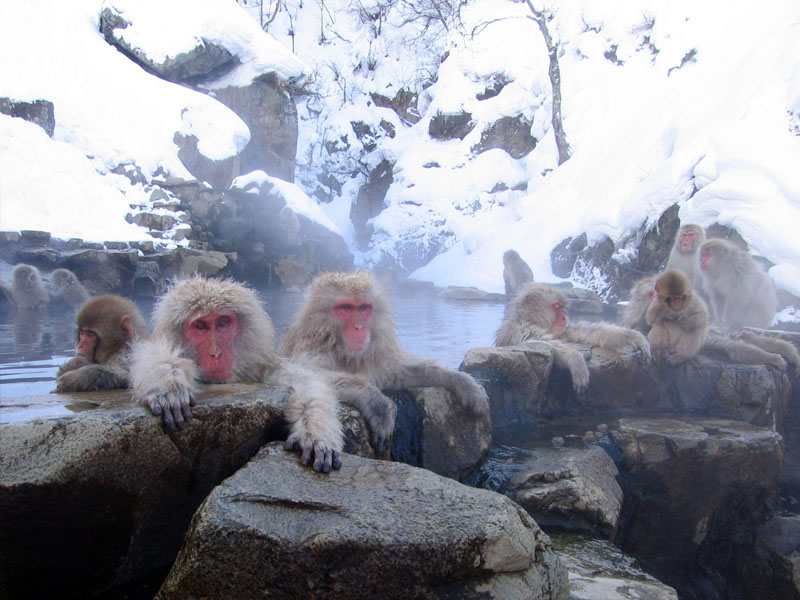
Japanese macaques enjoying a roten-buro open-air onsen at Jigokudani Monkey Park

- Asama Onsen
- Honzawa Onsen has the highest elevation for an open-air onsen, at 2,150 meters.
- Jigokudani
- Kakeyu Onsen
- Nozawaonsen
- Shibu
- Suwa
- Yudanaka Onsen

== Nagasaki Prefecture ==
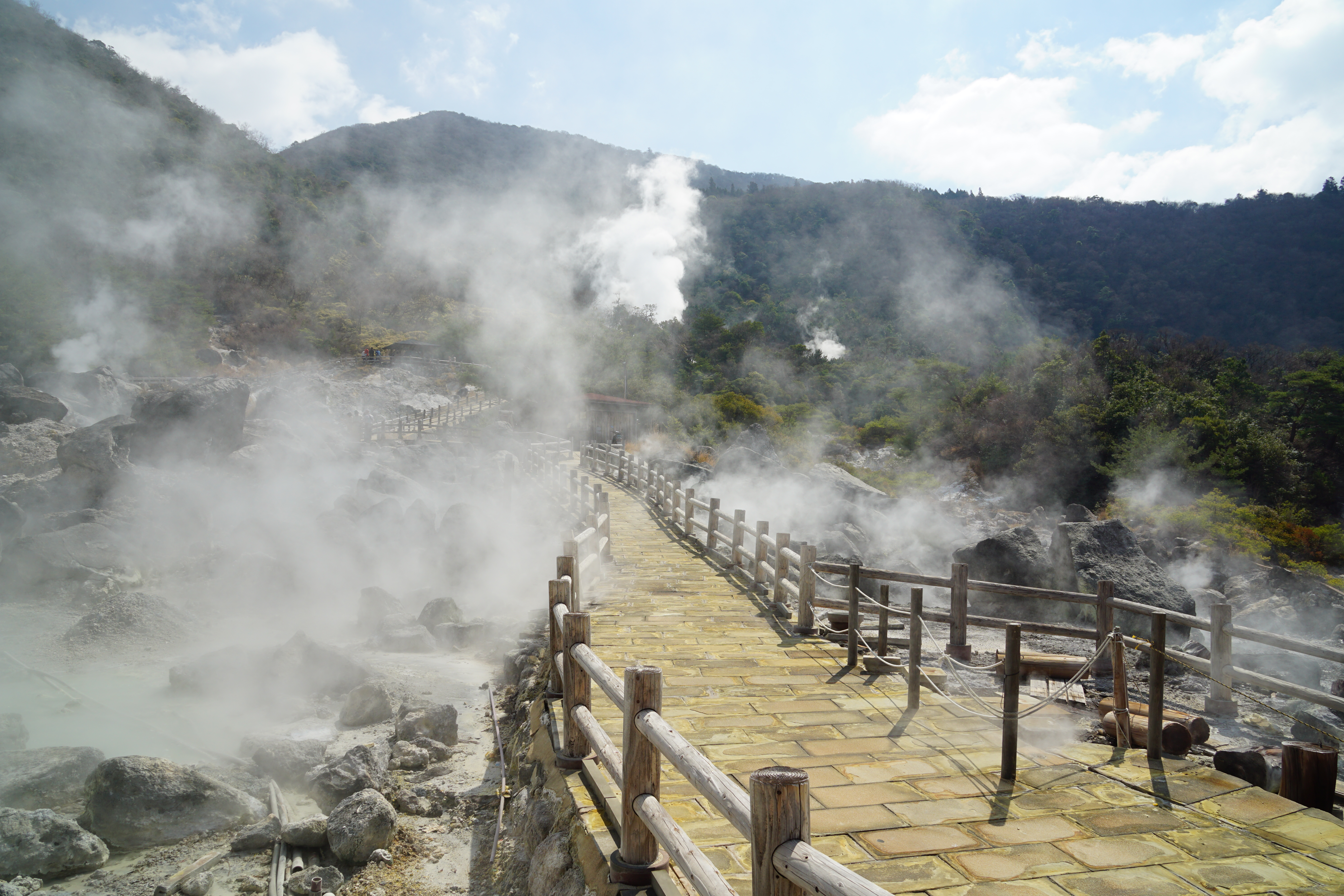
Unzen Onsen Jigoku Unzen Nagasaki prefecture

- Obama Onsen supposedly the hottest Japanese hot spring (105 °C or 221 °F)
- Shimabara, Nagasaki
- Unzen Onsen

== Niigata Prefecture ==
- Iwamuro, Niigata
- Senami Onsen
- Tsubame Onsen
- Tsukioka Onsen, Niigata
- Yuzawa, Niigata

== Okayama Prefecture ==
- Yubara Onsen, Okayama Prefecture at the foot of Yubara dam
- Yunogo Onsen, Okayama Prefecture

== Ōita Prefecture ==
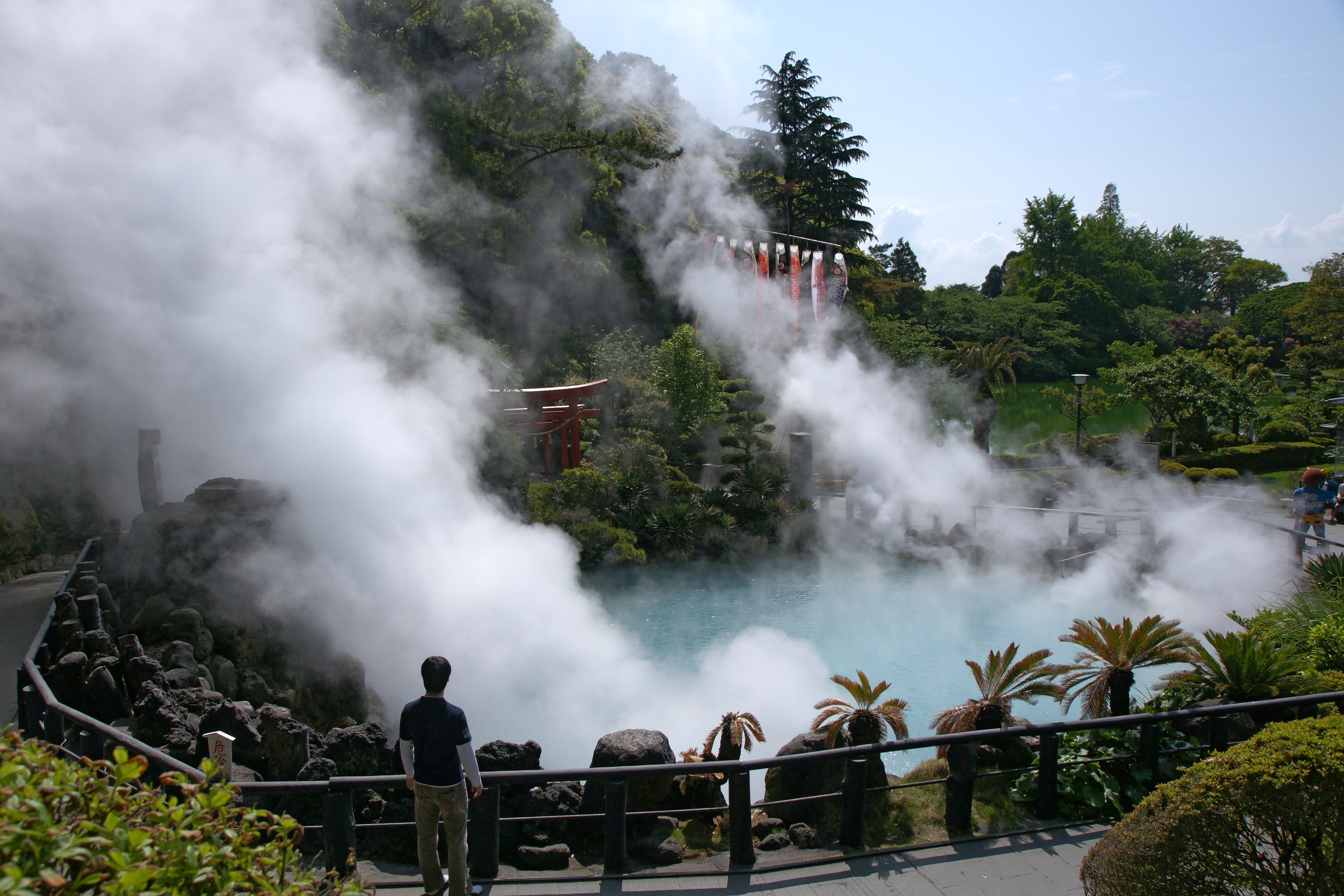
Beppu Umi-jigoku, Ōita prefecture

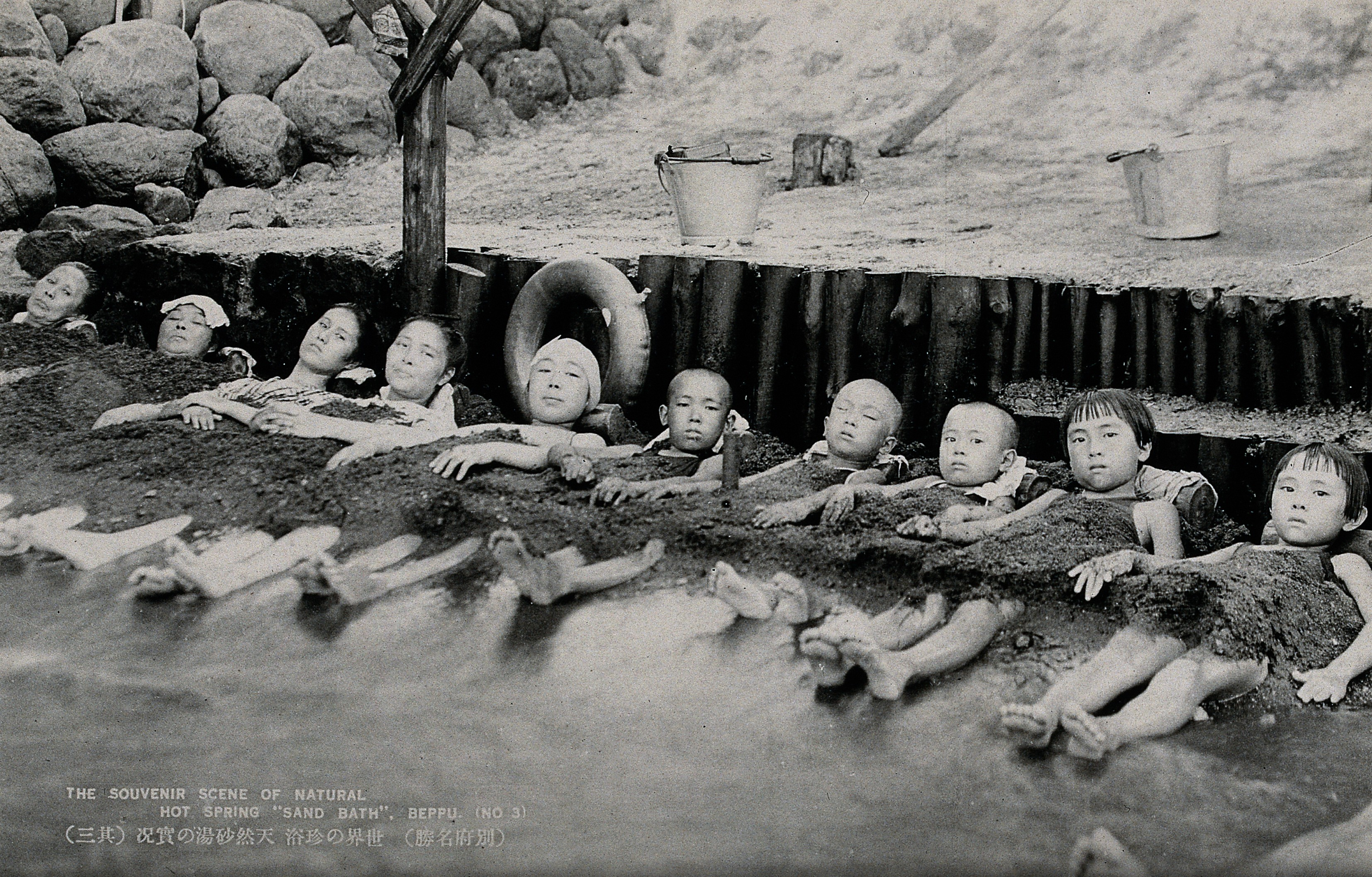
Women and children take a hot sand bath at a hot spring in Beppu

Oita is the prefecture with the most geothermal spring sources in Japan, 4,788 are registered. The prefecture also has the highest discharge rate of 296 kiloliters per minute

- Beppu Onsen, Hells of Beppu, Beppu, Ōita Prefecture
- Hyotan Onsen
- Kankaiji Onsen
- Myoban Yunosato Onsen
- Nagayu Onsen has the highest level of carbon dioxide of any hot spring in the world.
- Takegawara Onsen
- Yufuin, Ōita Prefecture

== Saga Prefecture ==
- Tara, Saga

== Saitama Prefecture ==
- Tokigawa Onsen and one other hot spring (Iiyama Onsen in Kanagawa Prefecture) are tied for first place for the highest alkalinity in the water.

== Shimane Prefecture ==
- Tamatsukuri Onsen is mentioned in the Izumo no Kuni Fudoki (Chronicle of the Land of Izumo) from the year, 733.

== Shizuoka Prefecture ==
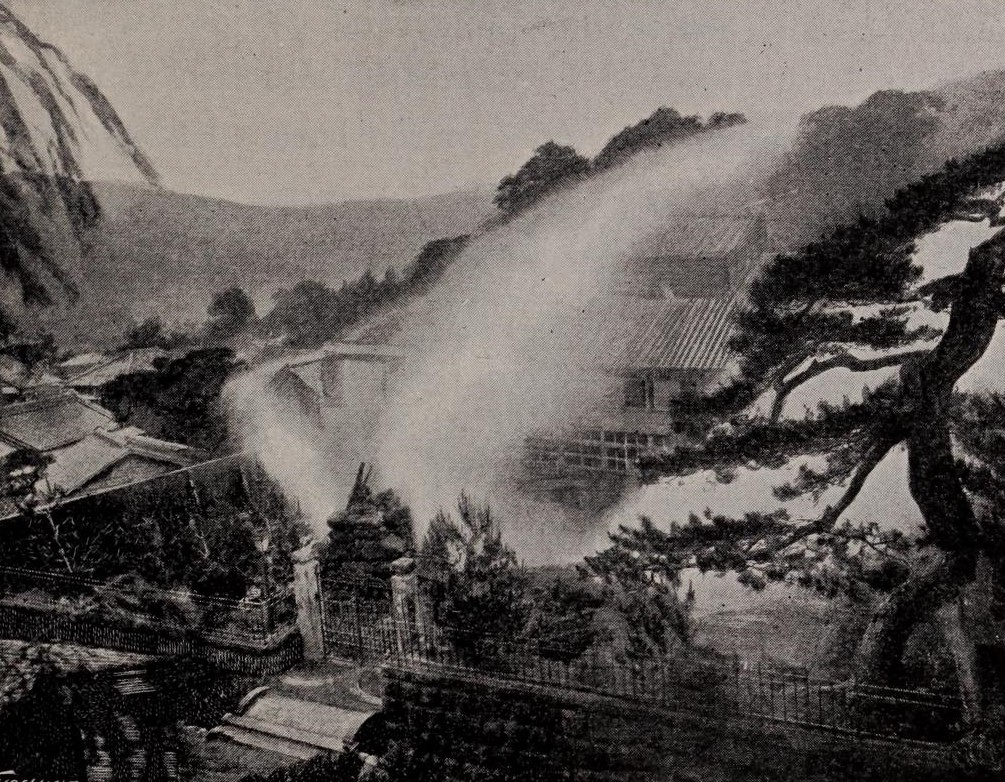
Geyser in Atami

- Atami Onsen, Atami
- Hokkawa Onsen
- Itō, Shizuoka
- Kanzanji Onsen
- Minami-Alps Akaishi Onsen Shirakaba-so
- Mine Onsen, Daifunto Park Kawazu town. (Dai funto park) Kawazu, Shizuoka
- Shuzenji Onsen
- Sumatakyō Onsen

== Tochigi Prefecture ==
- Kinugawa Onsen, Tochigi
- Shiobara Onsen

== Tottori Prefecture ==
- Hawai Onsen
- Kaike Onsen, Yonago, Tottori
- Misasa Onsen, Misasa
- Tōgō Onsen

== Toyama Prefecture ==
- Mikuriga-ike Onsen has the highest elevation of all hot springs in Japan, with an elevation of 2,400 meters.
- Unazuki Onsen, Kurobe

== Wakayama Prefecture ==
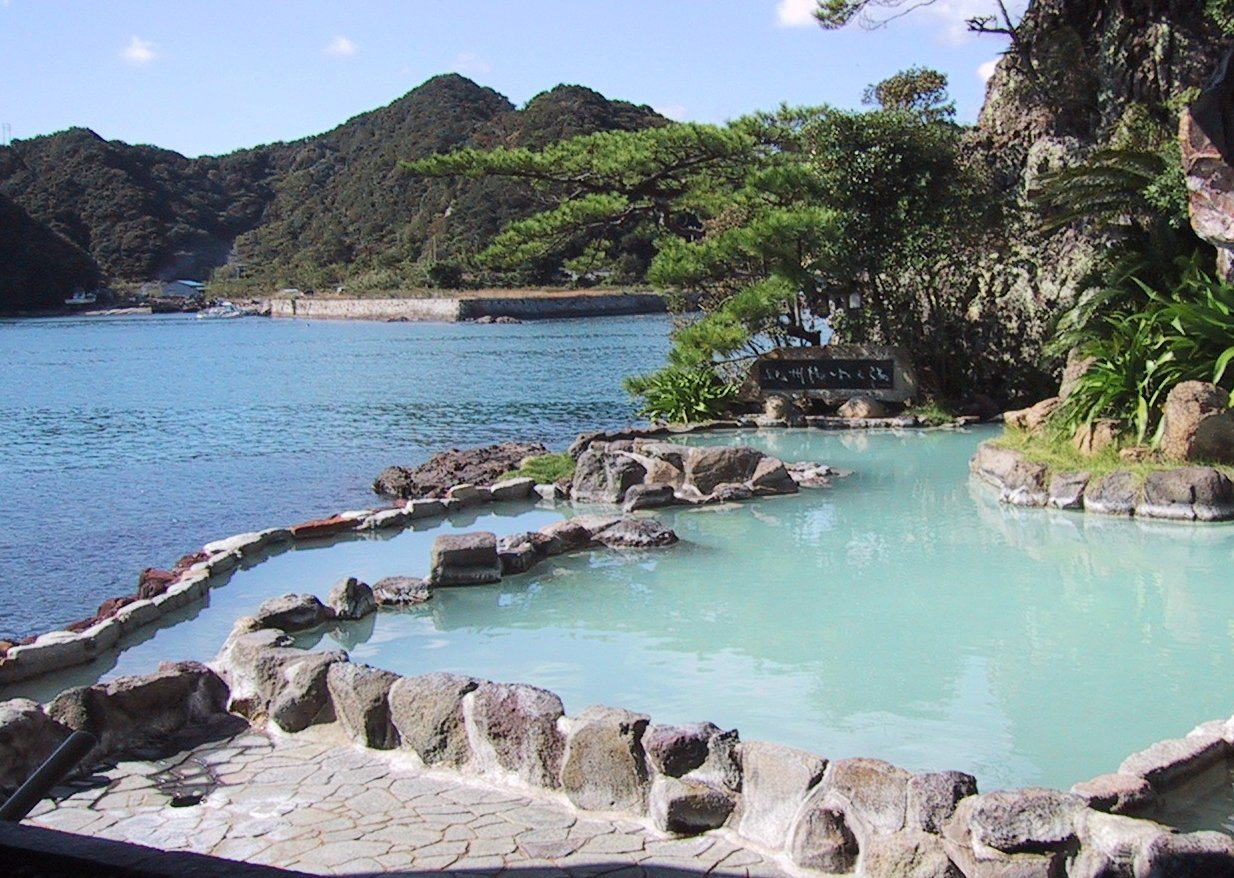
Onsen in Nachikatsuura, Japan, Wakayama prefecture

- Kawayu Onsen, Tanabe, Wakayama
- Nanki-Katsuura Onsen, Nachikatsuura, Wakayama
- Nanki-Shirahama Onsen, Shirahama
- Ryujin Onsen, Tanabe, Wakayama
- Tsubaki Onsen
- Yunomine Onsen, Tanabe, Wakayama, site of the UNESCO World Heritage Tsuboyu bath

== Yamagata Prefecture ==
- Akayu, Yamagata
- Ginzan Onsen, Obanazawa
- Zaō Onsen

== Yamanashi Prefecture ==
- Shimobe Onsen

== Other locations ==
- Kaniyu Onsen
- Okukinu hot springs group
- Sashiusudake [Baransky] hot springs - in disputed territory between Japan & Russia

== See also ==
- List of hot springs in the United States
- List of hot springs in the world
- Sentō
- Onsen
