= Kanazawa Yuwaku Yumeji-kan Museum =

Museum in Kanazawa, Ishikawa, Japan

- 金沢湯涌夢二館
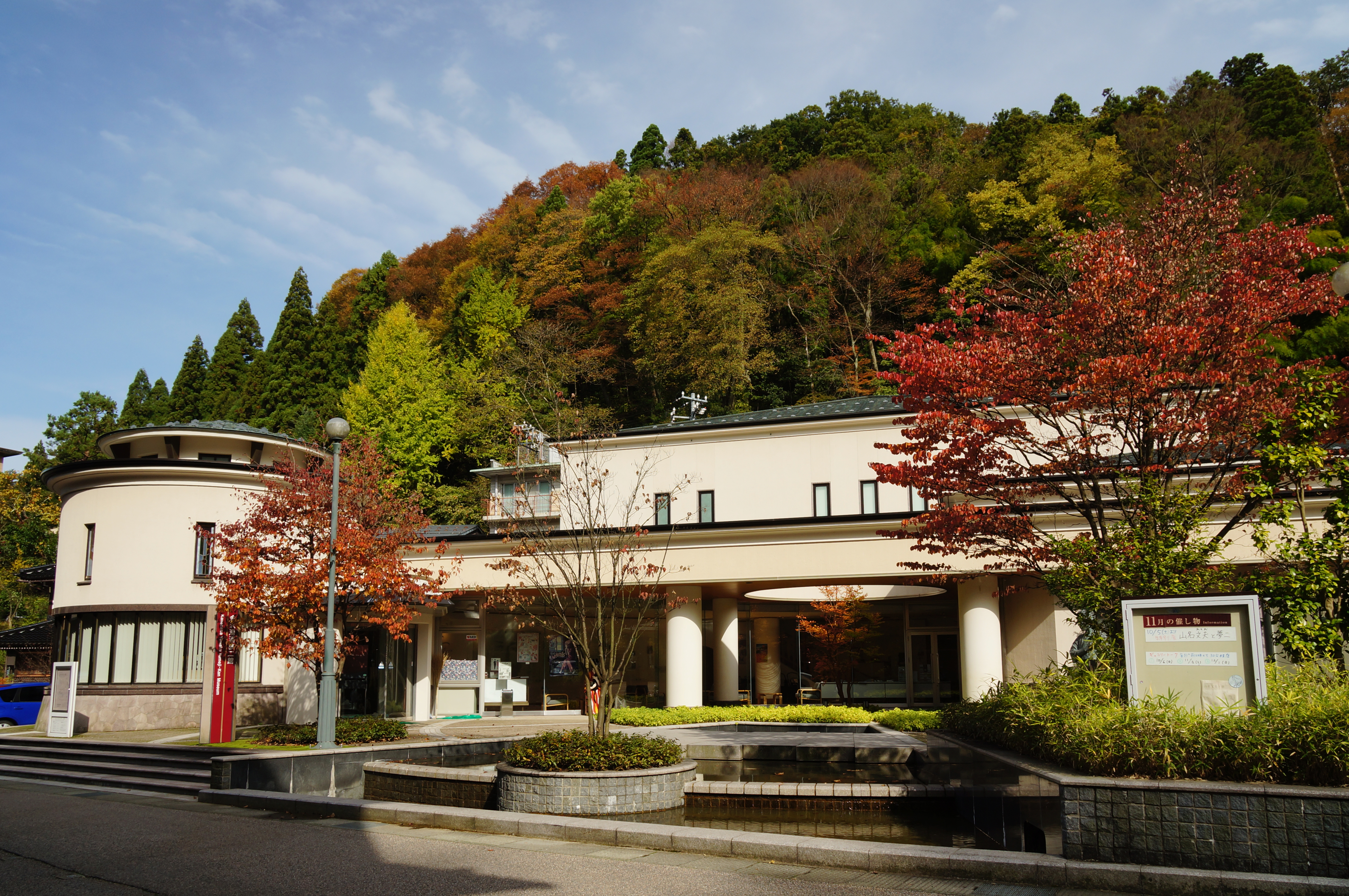
- Established: 16 April 2000
- Location: Kanazawa, Ishikawa, Japan
- Coordinates: 36°29′9.5″N 136°45′26.8″E
- Type: art Museum
- Website: Official website

The Kanazawa Yuwaku Yumeji-kan Museum (Japanese: 金沢湯涌夢二館) is a museum in Yuwaku Hot Spring, Kanazawa, Ishikawa Prefecture, Japan dedicated to the works of the artist Yumeji Takehisa.

== History ==
The museum was established in 2000.

== Architecture ==
The museum is housed in a two-story building. It features a shop.

== Exhibitions ==
The ground floor of the museum displays the three muses immortalized by Yumeji, named Tamaki, Hikono and Oyo. The upper floor displays the temporary exhibitions about Yumeji's works.

== Transportation ==
The museum is accessible by bus from Kanazawa Station of West Japan Railway Company.

== See also ==
- List of museums in Japan
