= Shuzenji Onsen =

Thermal spring system in Japan

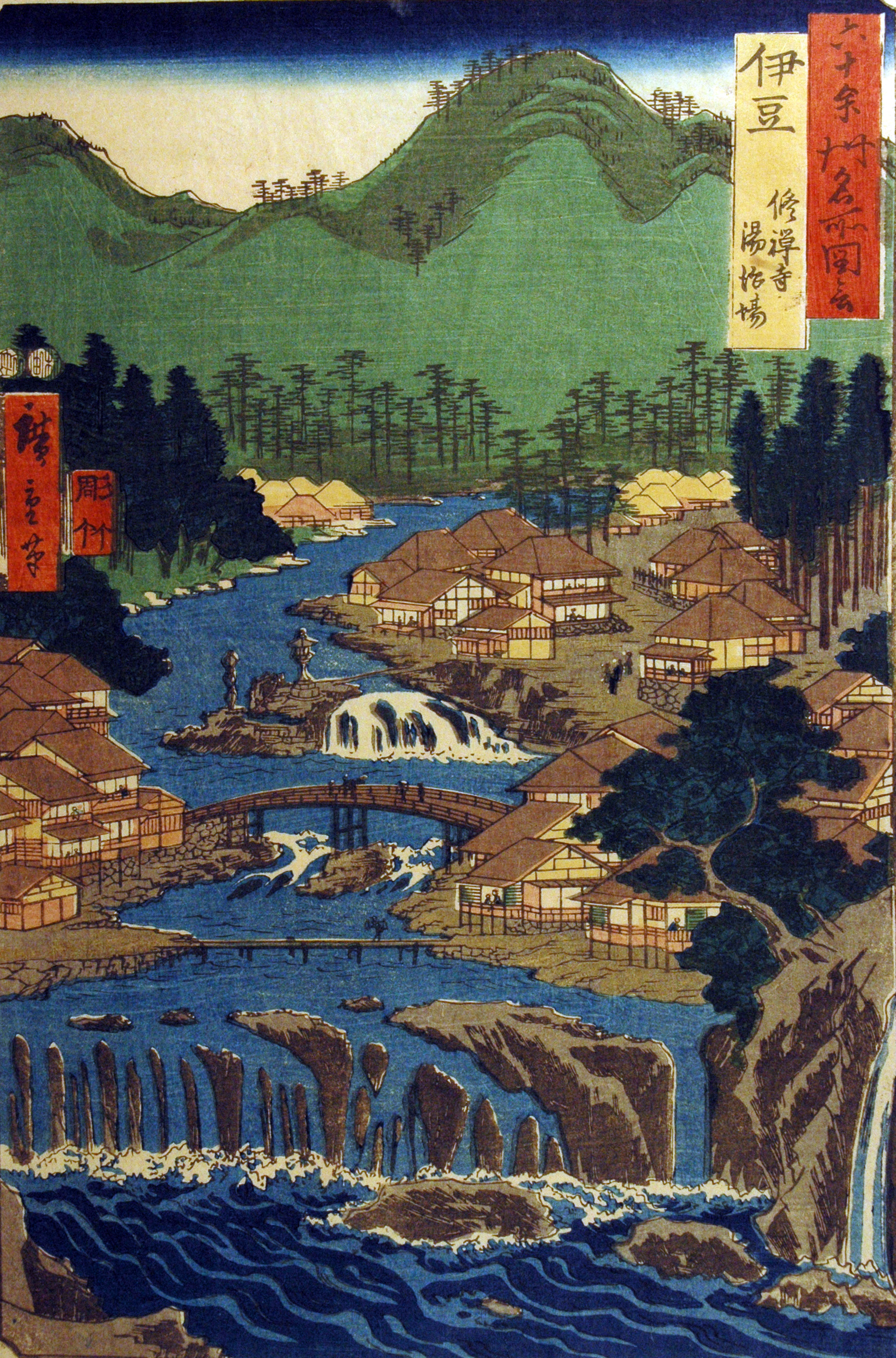
- The Hot Springs of Shuzen Temple, 1853 woodcut by Utagawa Hiroshige, Part of the series Famous Places in the Sixty-odd Provinces, No. 14 (Tōkaidō group)
- Interactive map of Shuzenji Onsen
- Location: Izu Province, Shizuoka, Japan
- Coordinates: 34.971°N 138.929°E
- Elevation: 308 feet

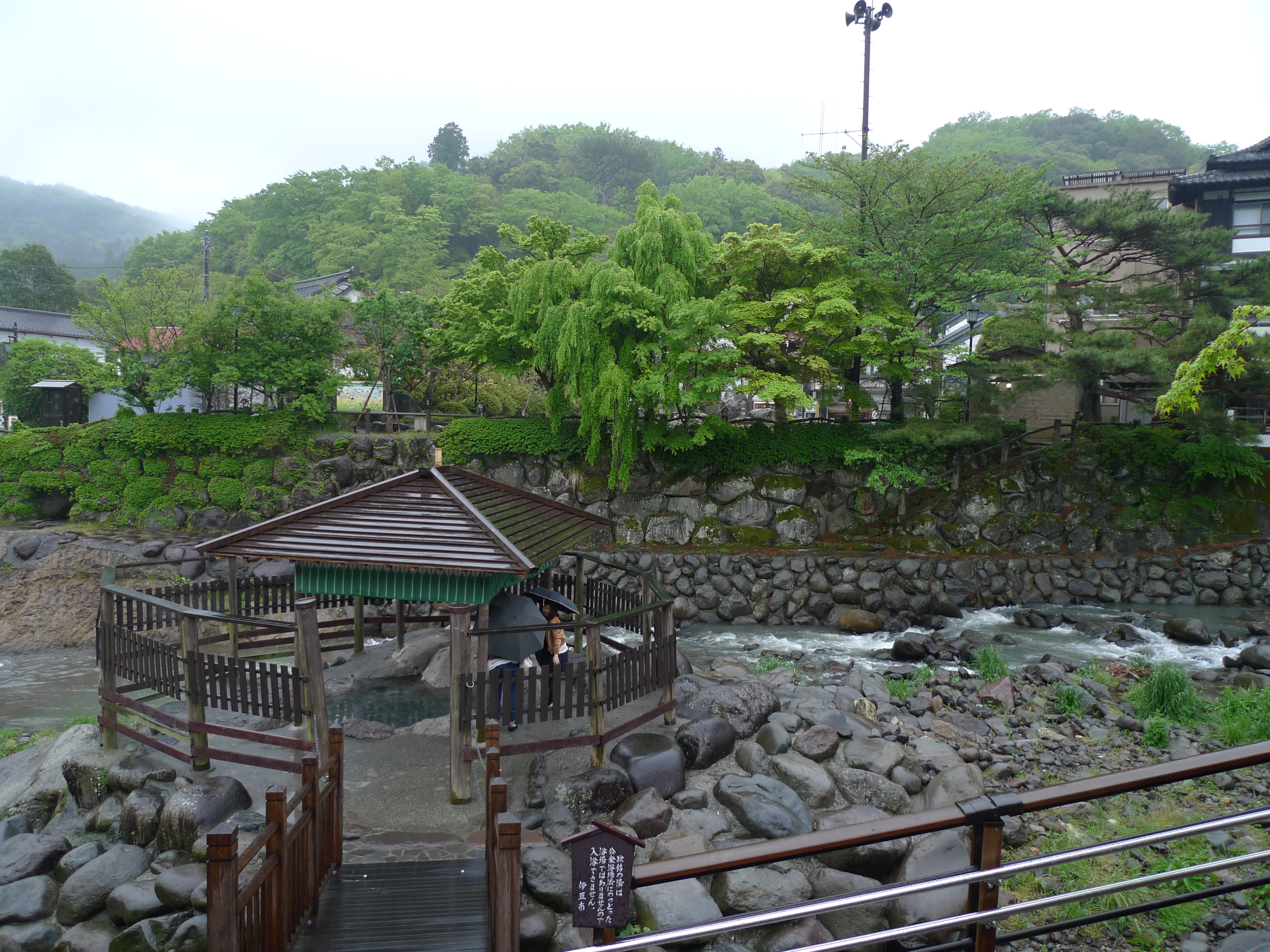
Tokko-no-yu spring, Shuzenji Onsen

Shuzenji Onsen is a geothermal spring system in the Tagata District of Shizuoka Prefecture, Japan, in the central region of Izu Peninsula.

== History ==
The hot springs have been used for over fourteen centuries for their therapeutic properties. Folklore tales describe the discovery and founding of the hot springs by Kobo Daishi (774–835), a Buddhist monk who probed at the rocks in the river with his walking stick (tokko) releasing the hot spring water. The historical town that was built up around the geothermal system was also called Shuzenji, however it has since merged into the city of Izu.

== Description ==
Tokko-no-yu is the best known hot spring in the system; it is located between the banks of the Katsura River in the middle of Shuzen town. A small rustic open-air public bath house has been built above the spring containing an ashiyu or foot spa. Kawara-no-yu is a hot spring in the system that is used as a public foot bath; it is located at the riverside. There are numerous commercial spa hotels and historic ryokan in the area, as well as Hakoyu, the public bathhouse.

== Geology ==
The onsen system is part of the Amagi volcanic mountain range. In Japan, more than 27,000 hot spring sources exist, many of which, including Shuzenji Onsen have been developed into onsen towns.

== See also ==
- List of hot springs in Japan
- List of hot springs in the world
