= Geto Onsen =

Thermal spring in Iwate Prefecture, Japan

- 夏油温泉
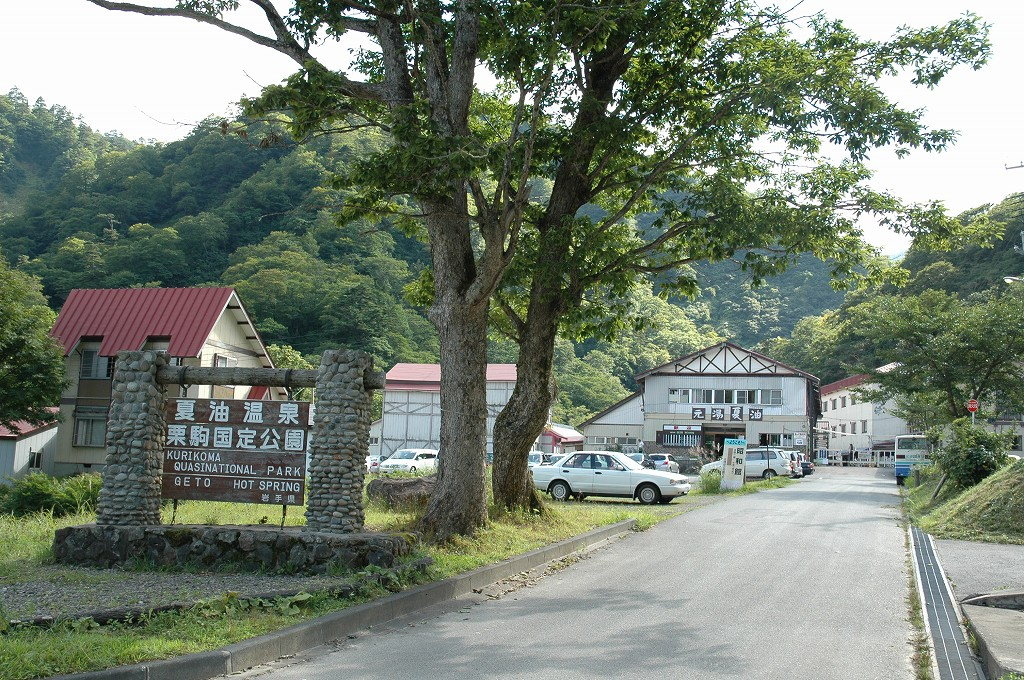

- Location within Japan

General information
- Status: Operational
- Architectural style: Japanese architecture
- Location: Kitakami, Iwate Prefecture, Japan
- Coordinates: 39°12′45.05″N 140°53′11.217″E
- Opened: 1134

Website
- mizuki.sakura.ne.jp/~geto/

Geto Onsen is an onsen town with traditional ryokan (Japanese inn) and natural hot spring baths. It was founded in 1134, and is one of the oldest establishments in Japan.

== History ==
The onsen town was founded in 1134 and is located in Kitakami, Iwate Prefecture, Japan.

== Location ==
The hot springs area is located in the center of Kurikoma Quasi-National Park, an area of natural beauty in Iwate Prefecture that includes beech tree forests, waterfalls, lakes and hiking trails. Upstream from the hot springs, the Tengu no Iwa is located. At 17.6 metres (58 ft) x 25 metres (82 ft) , it is the largest natural travertine dome located in Japan.

The onsen is reached by bus via the JR Kitakami Station Susumago/Semi Onsen/Geto Onsen Line.

== Accommodations ==
The onsen inns are located near the narrow and shallow river with crystal clear water. Accommodations are simple, but comfortable with traditional tatami and can be rented for a few hours to rest after the bathing. Some tourists come not only for springs, but to spend more days and enjoy one of Japan's most beautiful nature spots. Some rooms have facilities to cook one's own meals.

Access to the hot springs are limited in winter due to road closures from the beginning of November until May.

== Description ==
The hot springs emerge from seven spring sources, and flow into outdoor soaking pools overlooking the river.

There are five open-air baths with hot water and also colder water emerging from underground thermal springs. Water temperatures can fluctuate in times of seismic activity.

A short walk from the main onsen ares leads to a cave bath fed by a hot spring. The mineral content of the water is high in calcium sulfate.

There are different access times for men and women; only one of the soaking pool accommodates both men and women together.

== Gallery ==
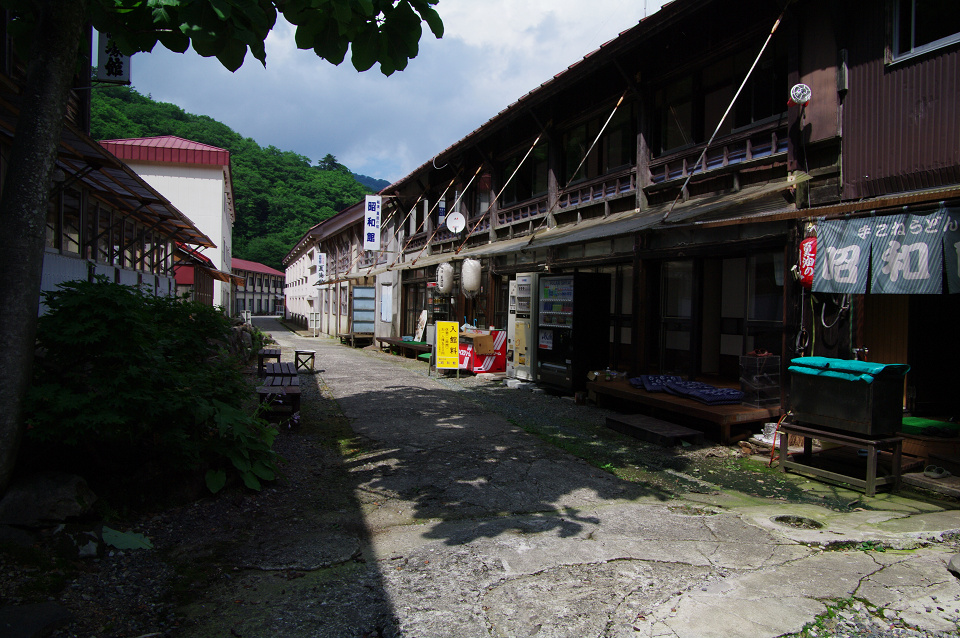

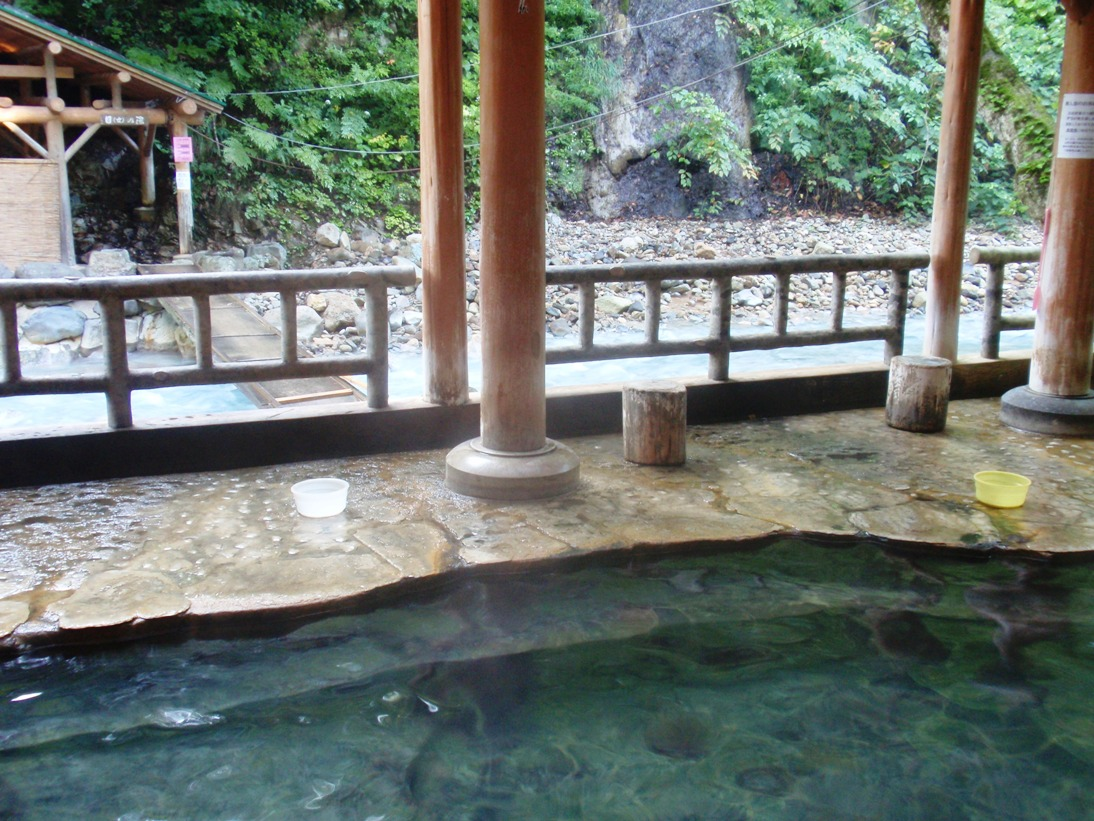

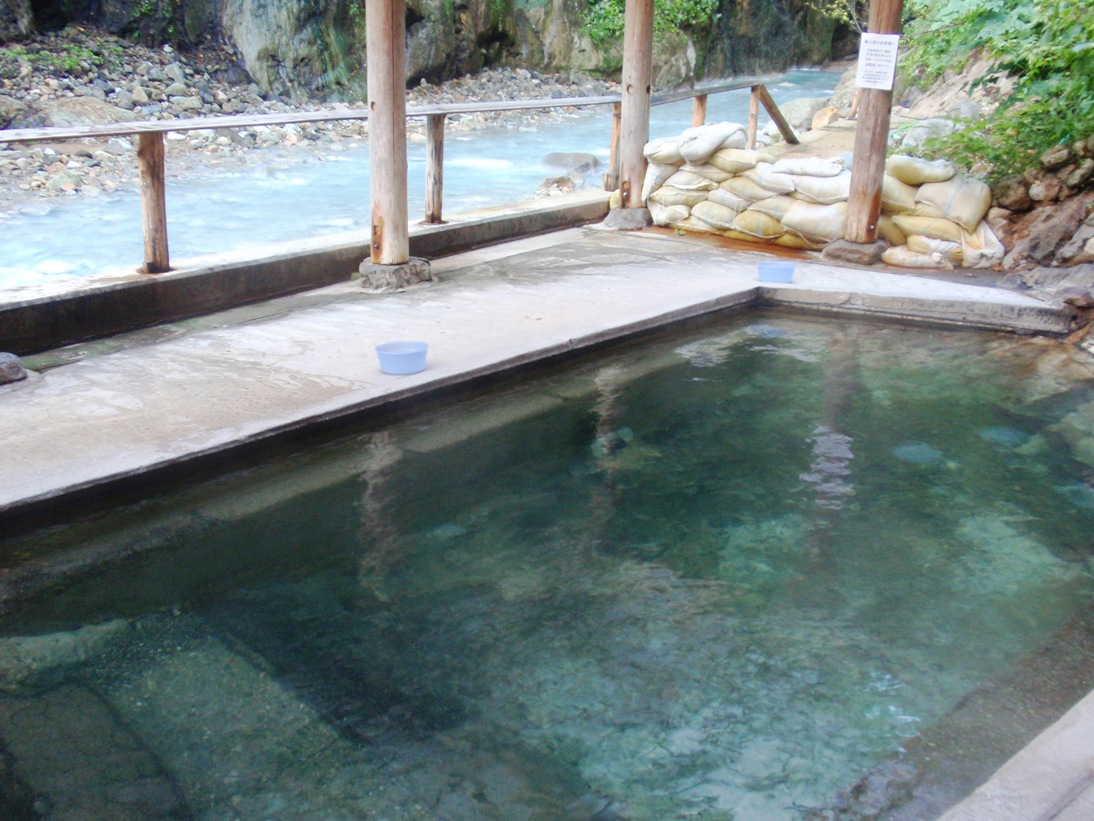

== See also ==
- Onsen
- List of oldest companies
- List of hot springs in Japan
- List of hot springs in the world
