= Mine Onsen =

Thermal spring

- Odoriko Onsen
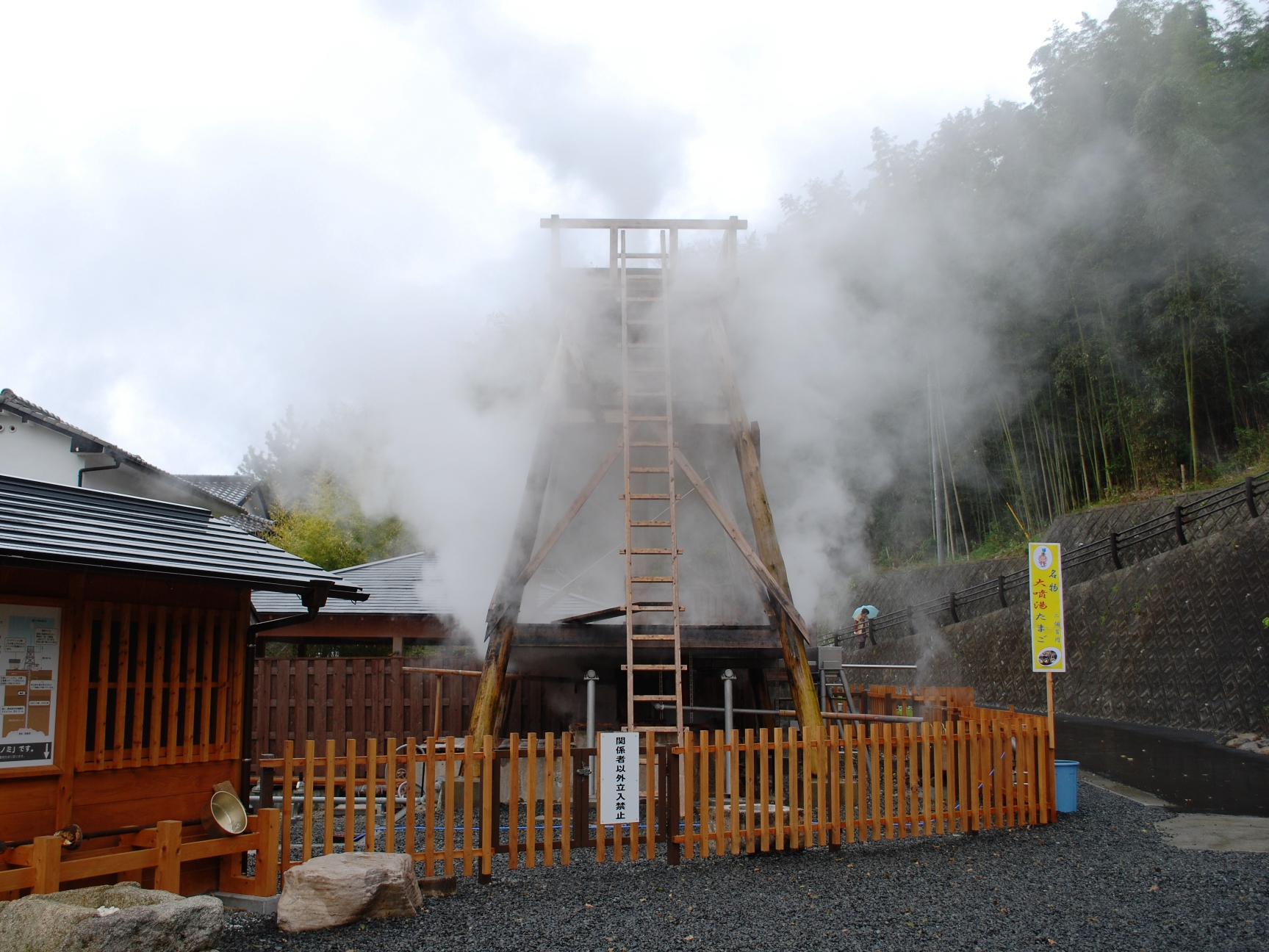
- Geyser erupting at Mine hot spring
- Interactive map of Mine Onsen
- Coordinates: 34°45′25″N 138°58′57″E
- Type: geothermal
- Temperature: 143 °F (62 °C)

Mine Onsen, also known by the name of the public bathhouse facility, Odoriko Onsen, is a geothermal hot spring located in Daifunto park, Kawazu, Shizuoka Prefecture, Japan. The hot springs are accessible from Tokyo on the Odoriko or the Super View Odoriko train lines.

== Water profile ==
Mine Onsen is part of the Kawazu hot spring system. The mineral water is high in sodium chloride and sulphur; it emerges from the source at 143°F (61.6°C). There is a geyser onsite, which erupts regularly, shooting water into the air at 200°F.

Thermus thermophilus bacteria has been isolated in the hot spring water.

== See also ==
- List of hot springs in Japan
- List of hot springs in the world
