= Tenninkyo Onsen =

Hot spring in Hokkaidō Prefecture, Japan

Coordinates: 43°37′18″N 142°46′50″E

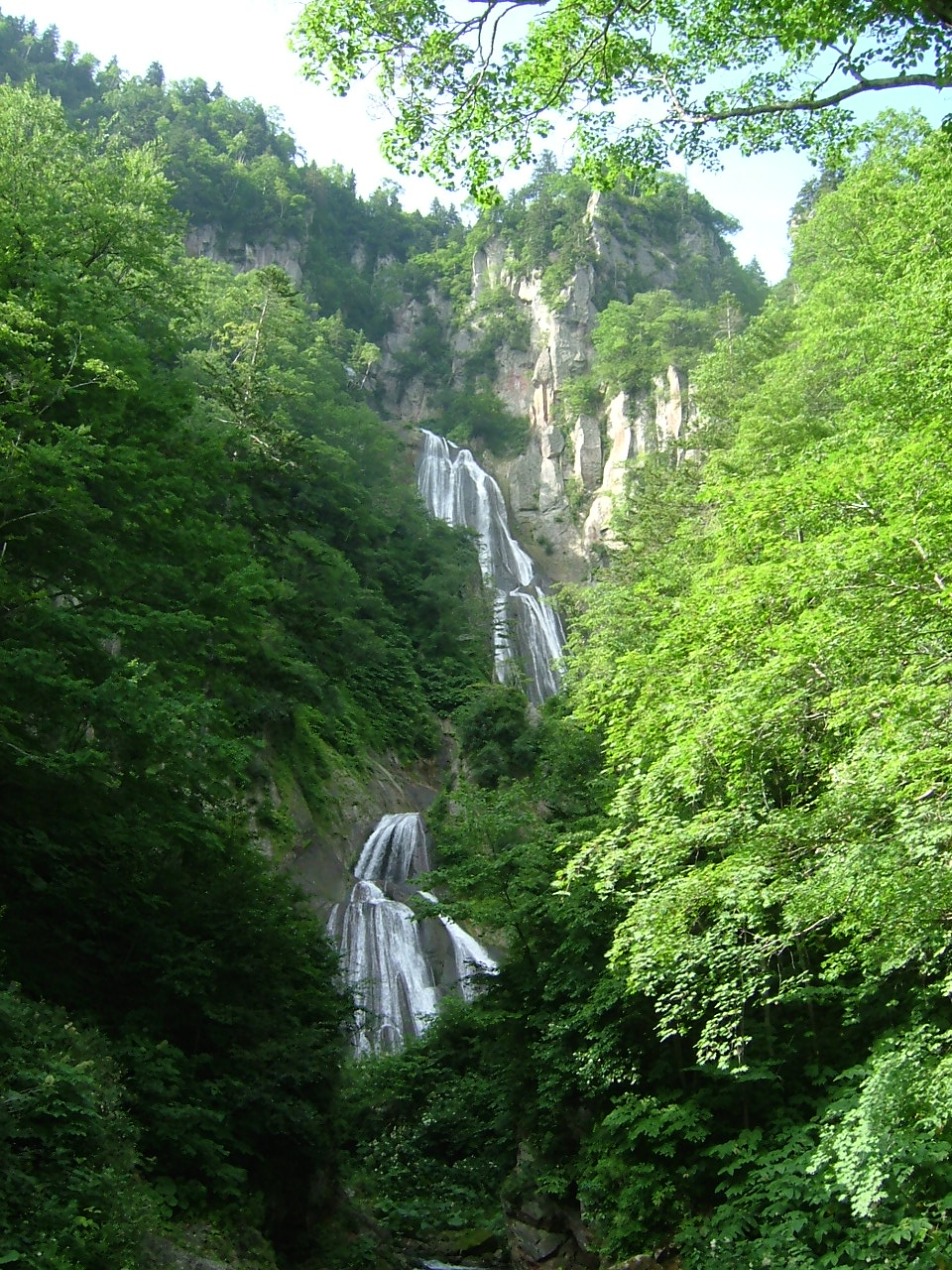
The Hagoromo Waterfall in Tenninkyō Onsen.

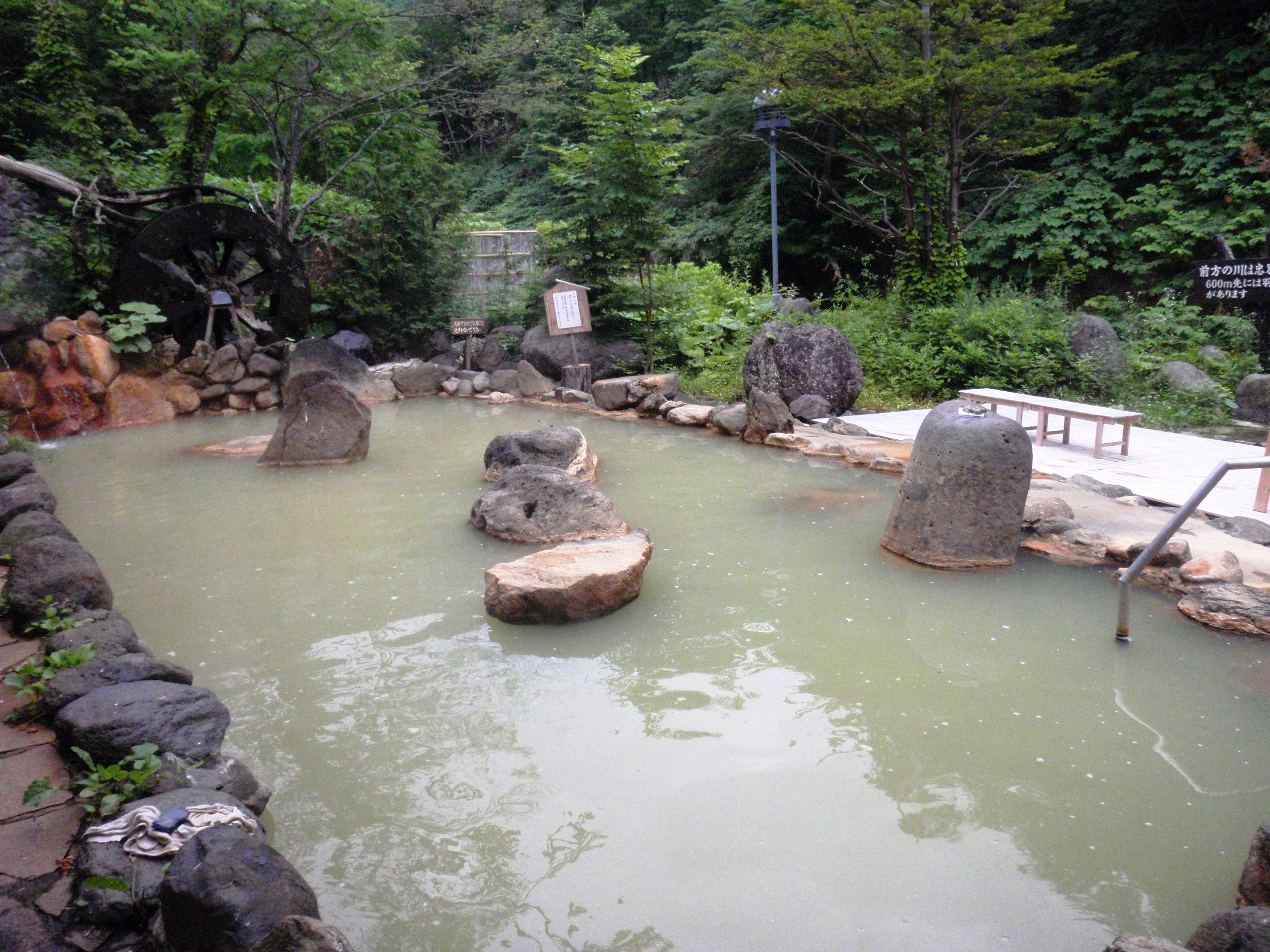
Tenninkyo hot spring soaking pool

Tenninkyō Onsen (天人峡温泉) is a geothermal hot spring village with a small onsen resort in the Daisetsuzan National Park, Hokkaidō, Japan.

== Facilities ==
As of 2023, only the restaurant/onsen is operating, other hotel buildings being closed off and derelict.

== Attractions ==
There are waterfalls nearby that attract a number of visitors, for example the 270 meter Hagoromo Waterfall (羽衣の滝, hagoromo no taki) and the Shikishima Waterfall (敷島の滝, shikishima no taki). There are also a number of popular hiking courses nearby. A hiking trail head is located in the village that leads to the Hagoromo Falls, continuing further, hikers will reach another waterfall. There are many hiking trails in the National Park.

== Access ==
The onsen is located approximately one hour from the city of Asahikawa, and is accessible by car. Limited public transportation exists within the National Park. Nearby hot springs include Sounkyo Onsen and Ashidadake Onsen. Lodging is available in the area.

== See also ==
- List of hot springs in Japan
- List of hot springs in the world
