= Nanki-Katsuura Onsen =

Hot spring in Nachikatsuura, Wakayama Prefecture, Japan

- 南紀勝浦温泉
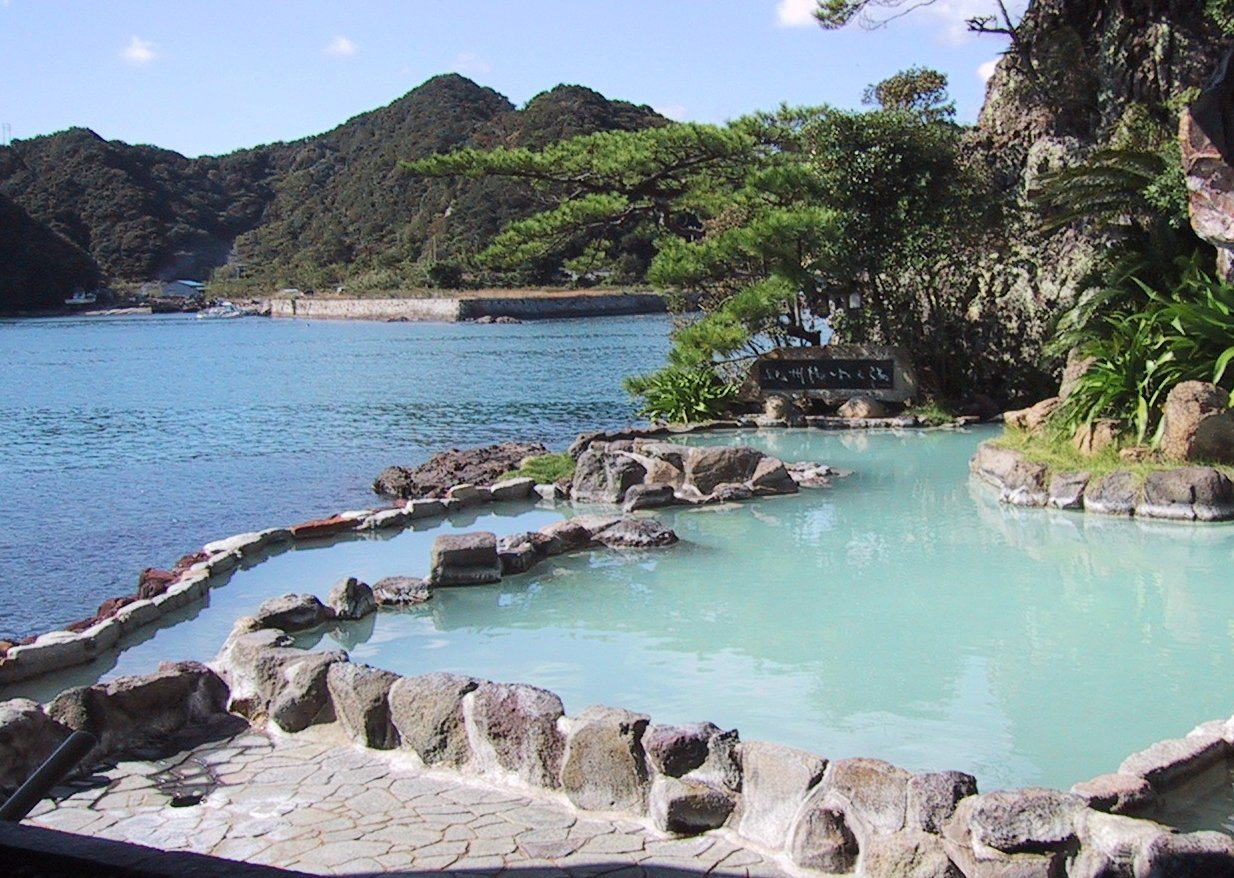
- Nanki-Katsuura Onsen

- Location within Japan
- Interactive map of Nanki-Katsuura Onsen
- Location: Nachikatsuura, Wakayama Prefecture, Japan
- Coordinates: 33°38′N 135°56′E

Nanki-Katsuura Onsen (南紀勝浦温泉) is a coastal onsen, or hot spring, located in Nachikatsuura, Wakayama Prefecture, Japan. Originally known as "Katsuura Onsen", the "Nanki-" was added to distinguish it from another onsen in Katsuura, Chiba.

Known as the "Matsushima of Kii", Nanki-Katsuura Onsen is one of the most popular hot springs in Japan due to its location along the coast and springs within caves. The spring is listed as the "Top 100 Onsens" by Kankokeizai News.

== Overview ==
Nanki-Katsuura Onsen is located within Yoshino-Kumano National Park and Nanki-Kumano Geopark. The area surrounding Nanki-Katsuura Onsen has a very long history, and many of the temples nearby are protected as the Sacred Sites and Pilgrimage Routes in the Kii Mountain Range. The onsen town itself, which dates back to the Edo Period, has more than one hundred springs overlooking the Pacific Ocean. These springs are scattered among the rugged terrain, including a peninsula known as Urashima (浦島) and an island known as Nakanoshima (中ノ島). Most ryokans are only accessible by boat from Katsuura Harbor. Aside from its hot springs, Nanki-Katsuura Onsen is also known for tuna.

Nanki-Katsuura Onsen has a character within Onsen Musume named Kiki (樹紀) voiced by Maya Yoshioka.

== Transportation ==
Nanki-Katsuura Onsen can be reached via Japan National Route 42 by road, or through Kii-Katsuura Station on the Kisei Main Line.
