= Funaoka Onsen =

Onsen (public bath house) in Kyoto, Japan

Coordinates: 35.0369°N 135.7446°E

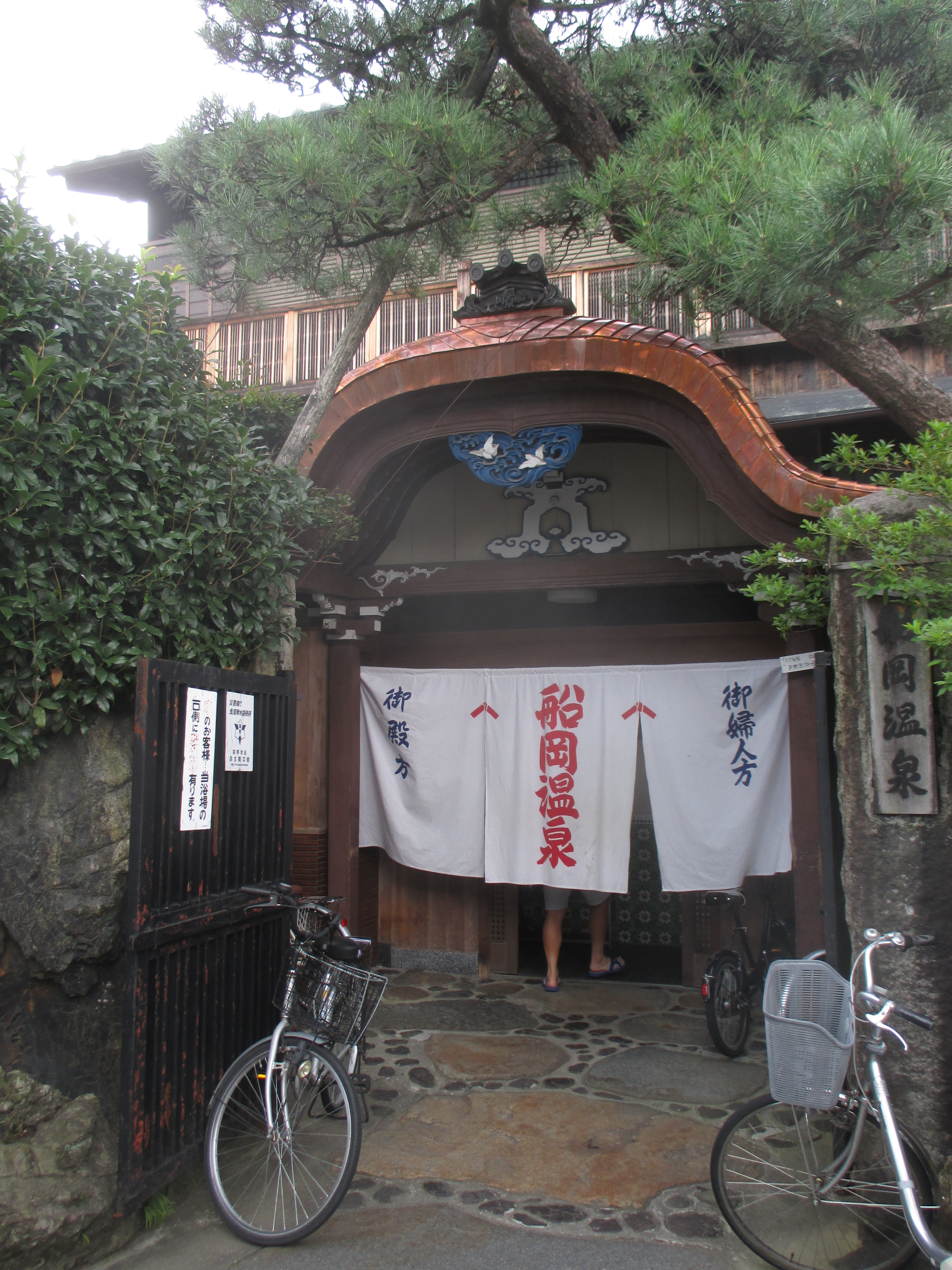
Funaoka Onsen

Funaoka Onsen (船岡温泉) is an onsen (public bath house) in Kyoto, Japan.

The building is made out of wood and dates to 1923. The authorities registered it as a Tangible Cultural Property. The front entrance gate features a karahafu undulating curved gable at the top, a feature that can be found often in Japanese castles. The interior has ornately covered panels out of wood which depict historical events and myths. It was carved by artists who work for the Imperial Court and it took them around 10 years to complete.

The onsen has eight different baths, including a bath with electromagnetic current, a bath with a waterfall effect, and a bath with an herbal mixture added to the water. The onsen is known for being "tattoo-friendly," as it admits bathers with tattoos, unlike many public baths in Japan.
