= Minami-Alps Akaishi Onsen Shirakaba-so =

Thermal spring

Minami-Alps Akaishi Onsen Shirakaba-so 南アルプス赤石温泉白樺荘
- Location within Shizuoka Prefecture Location within Japan
- Location: Shizuoka, Shizuoka, Japan
- Coordinates: 35°18′25″N 138°11′16″E
- Type: sulfur
- Temperature: 38.2 deg C

Minami-Alps Akaishi Onsen Shirakaba-so (Minnami-arupusu Akaishi-onsen Shirakaba-so (南アルプス赤石温泉白樺荘)) is the site of a hot spring, located in Shizuoka City in Shizuoka Prefecture.
