= Atami Onsen =

Hot springs in Shizuoka Prefecture, Japan

Coordinates: 35.10336°N 139.07906°E

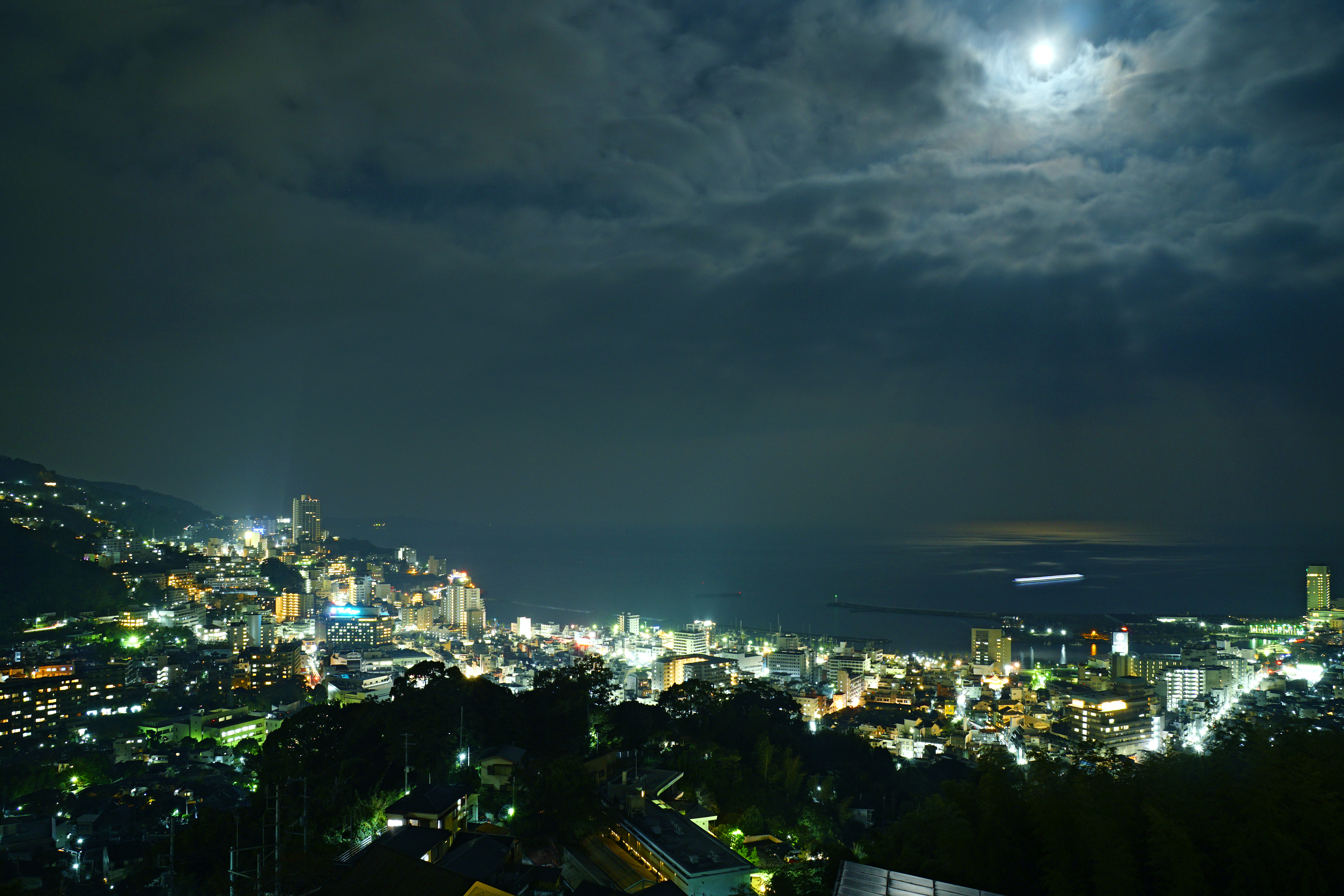
Atami Onsen Town at Night

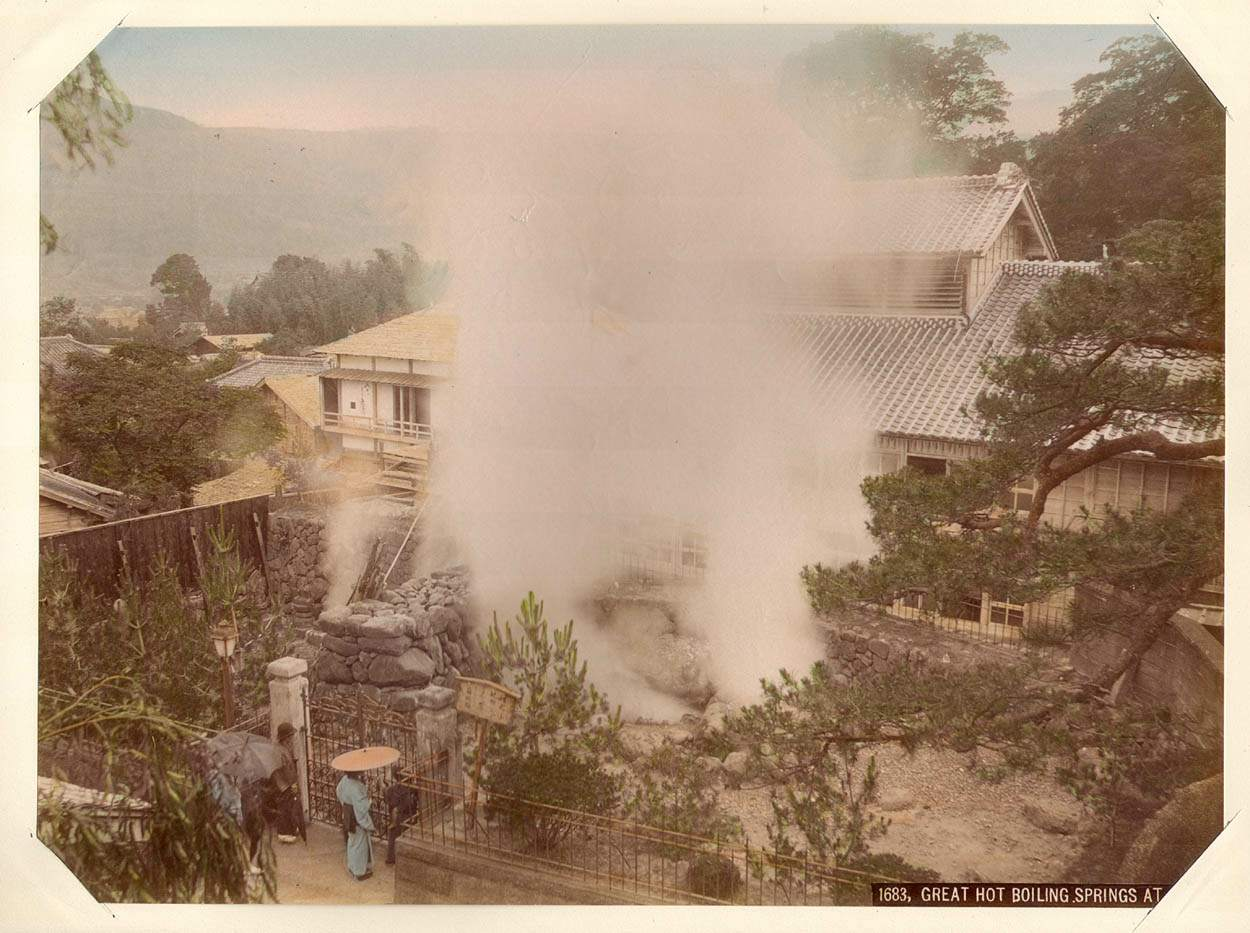
Kusakabe Kimbei, Great Hot Boiling Springs at Atami

Atami Onsen is a hot springs resort in Atami, Shizuoka Prefecture, Japan.

== Description ==
Atami Onsen overlooks Sagami Bay on the Izu Peninsula, located approximately 97 kilometres (60 miles) west of Tokyo. There are approximately 500 hot springs in the Atami geothermal spring system. The hot spring system discharges 20,000 liters (5,300 U.S. gal) per minute.

== History ==
Legend has it that during the Nara period (749 CE), Manmakino kami of Hakone Gongen prayed to Yakushi Nyorai. This prayer is said to have redirected the hot springs from the ocean inland to the current site of the Oyu Geyser, leading to the establishment of Atami Onsen and the later construction of Yuzen Shrine. Manmakino kami is also credited with bringing samples of the water back to Edo.

In the 17th century, Shogun Tokugawa Ieyasu wanted to recreate their alleged healing properties, so he tried to build a similar onsen in Edo (Tokyo).

== Geothermal energy ==
The geothermal system has been excavated through boring and pump extraction.

== Water profile ==
Some of the spring sources are hot brine springs or chloride springs.

== Gallery ==
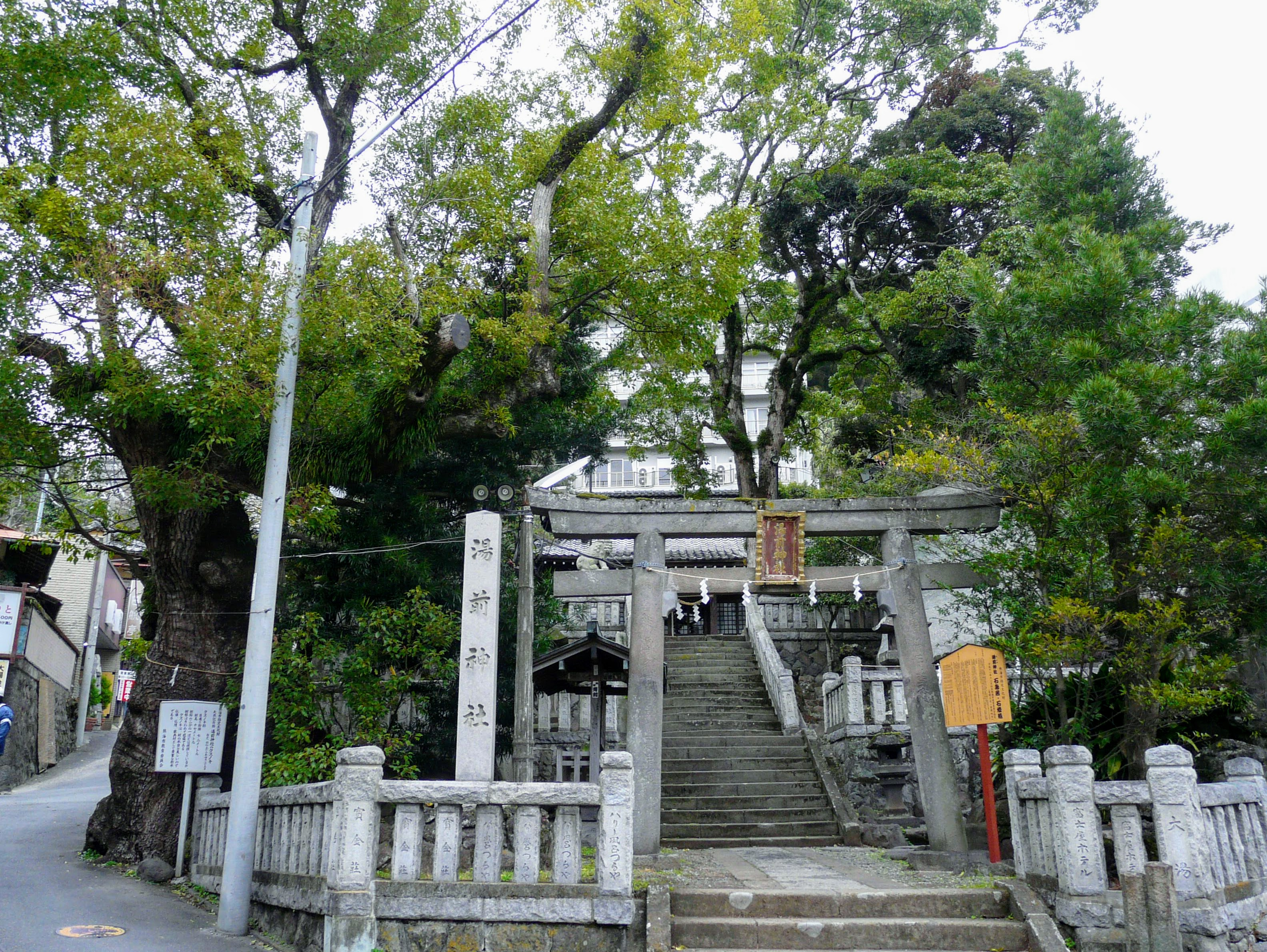
Yuzen shrine at Atami Onsen, enshrines the kami Sukunabikona

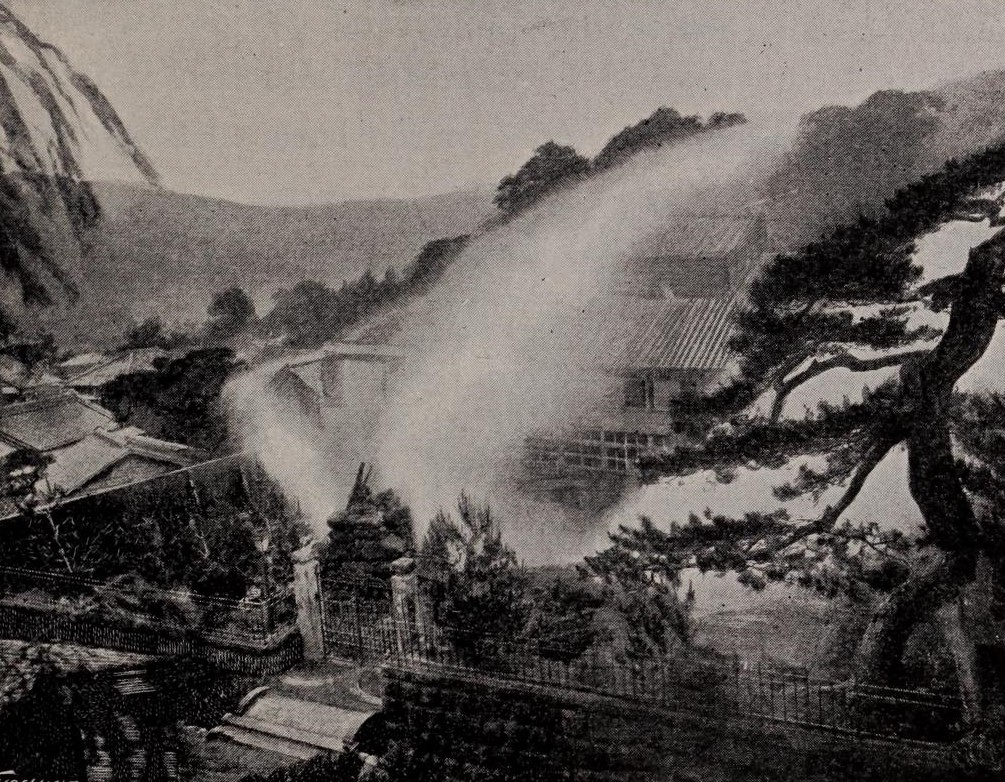
Geyser in Atami Onsen, 1899

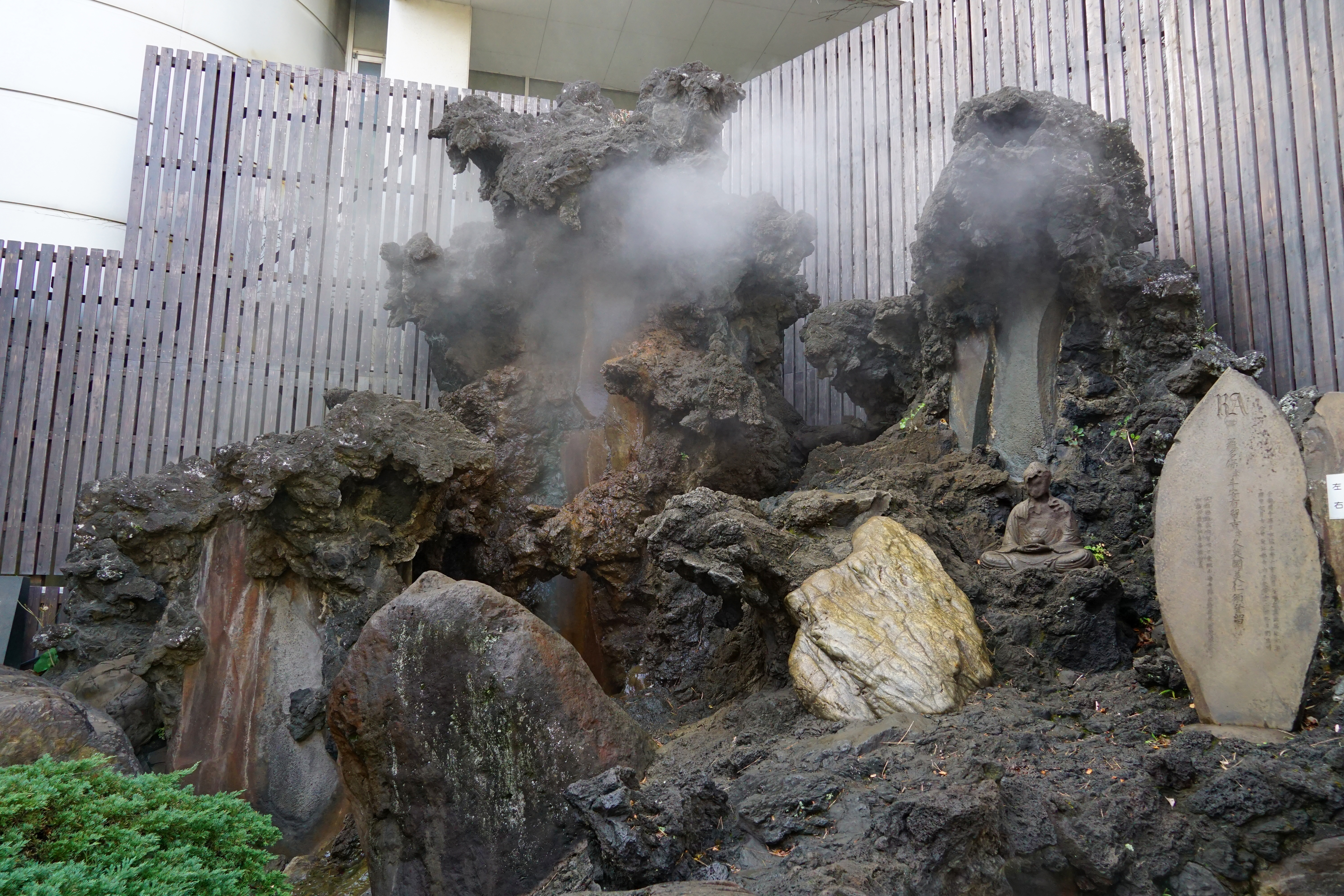
The Oyu Geyser at Atami Onsen

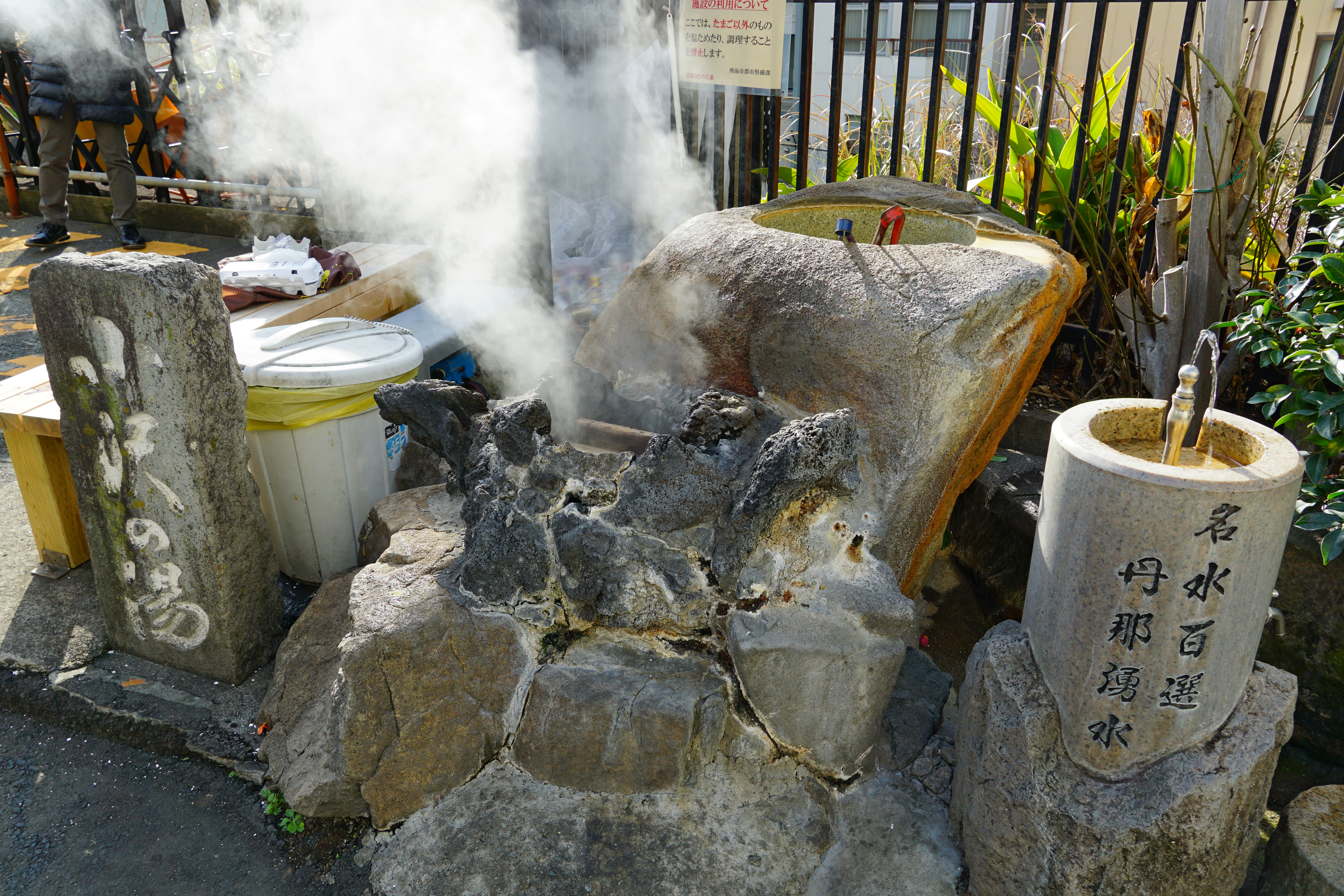
Ozawa-no-yu hot spring in Atami Onsen
