= Yuwaku Onsen =

Hot spring in Kanazawa, Ishikawa, Japan

- 湯涌温泉
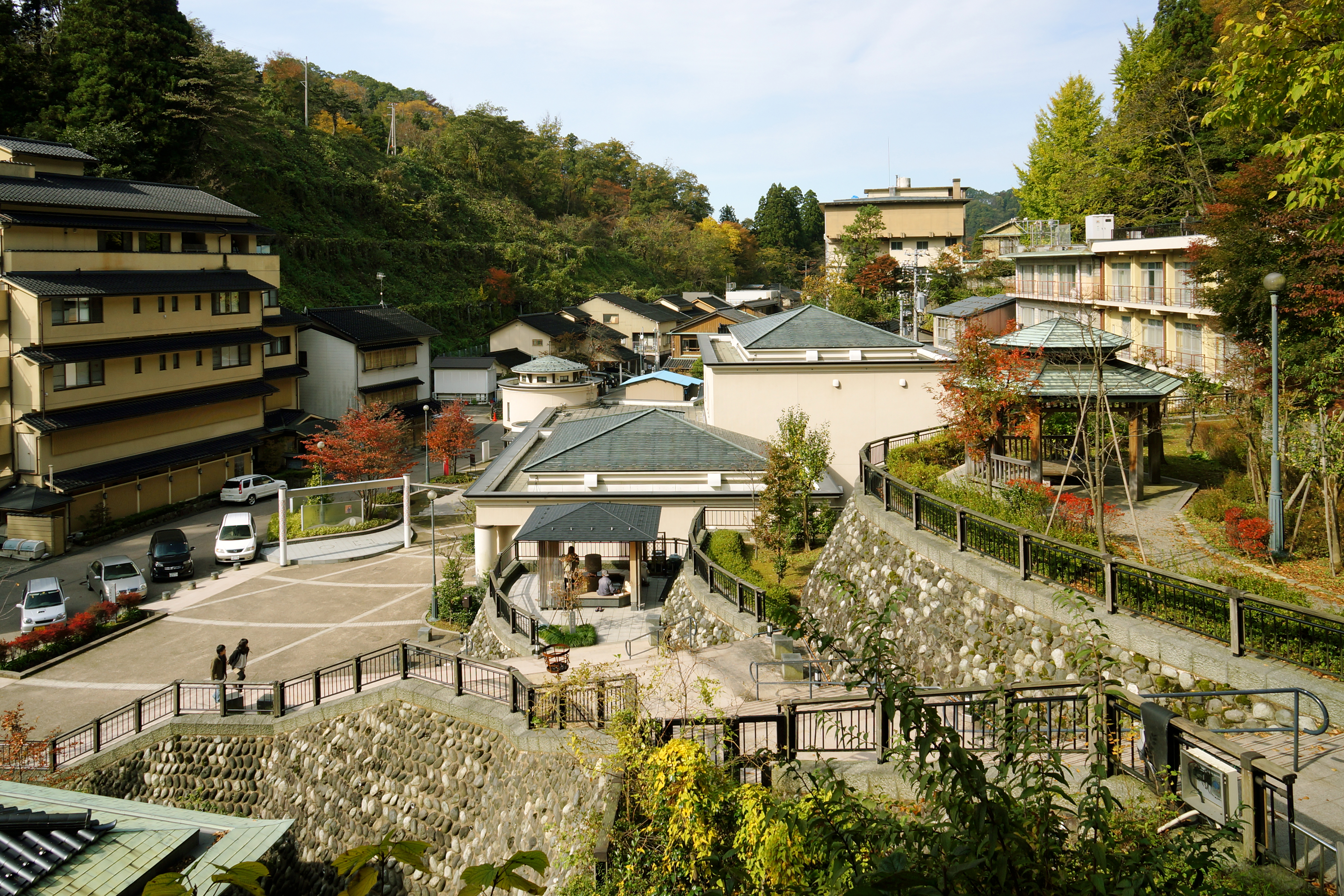

- Location within Ishikawa Prefecture
- Interactive map of Yuwaku Onsen
- Location: Kanazawa, Ishikawa Prefecture, Japan
- Coordinates: 36°29′08.6″N 136°45′27.1″E
- Elevation: 400 m (1,300 ft)
- Type: mild alkaline
- Temperature: 32 °C (90 °F)

The Yuwaku Onsen (湯涌温泉) is a hot spring resort in Kanazawa, Ishikawa Prefecture, Japan.

== History ==
As with several other hot spring resorts in the area, Yuwaku Onsen claims to have been founded in the Nara period by a paper-maker who followed an injured white heron and discovered that it was healing itself in the warm waters. This gives it a history of 1,300 years.

The onsen was developed by the Maeda clan of Kaga Domain in the Edo period. In the Meiji period, the painter Takehisa Yumeji was a visitor.

== Geology ==
The hot spring is at an altitude of 400 meters above sea level at the foot of Mount Ioh. The water is slightly alkaline and contains gypsum. The mean temperature for the water is 32 °C.

== Infrastructures ==
The area houses nine small hot spring inns.

== Transportation ==
The hot spring is accessible by bus from Kanazawa Station of West Japan Railway Company.

== See also ==
- Onsen
