= Mogyoktang =

Korean public bathhouse

Mogyoktangs (Korean: 목욕탕; Hanja: 沐浴湯) are Korean public bathhouses. Typical facilities in the bathhouses include lockers, showers, hot tubs, steam rooms, massage areas, and barbershops. Unlike the generally more elaborate jjimjilbangs, which can include facilities such as sleeping areas, snack bars, and PC bangs, mogyoktangs are usually only bathhouses and not open 24 hours. They are also divided into men-only and women-only sections.

== See also ==
- Jjimjilbang
- Sentō
- Sauna
- Taiwanese hot springs
- Ttaemiri
