= List of Kamen Rider Revice episodes =

Kamen Rider Revice is a Japanese tokusatsu drama in Toei Company's Kamen Rider series produced by TV Asahi. It is the third series in the Reiwa period run and the 32nd series overall, also commemorating the 50th anniversary of the franchise.

== Episodes ==
No.	Title	Directed by	Written by	Original release date
1	"Family! Contract! The Devil Whispers!"; Transliteration: "Kazoku! Keiyaku! Akuma Sasayaku!" (Japanese: 家族！契約！悪魔ささやく！)	Takayuki Shibasaki	Hanta Kinoshita	September 5, 2021
Ikki Igarashi's life takes a strange turn when he starts seeing a demon that appeared from within his body while working at his family's bathhouse. He, his sister Sakura, and their mother Yukimi later attend a ceremony held by the defense agency Fenix to promote Ikki's younger brother Daiji as the designated user of an arsenal designed to fight Deadmans, a cult that seeks to revive a powerful demon named Giff while committing acts of terror with their inner demons. However, Deadmans' leading members launch an attack during the ceremony with a Mammoth Deadman they created from a death-row prisoner, with Fenix member Hiromi Kadota complicating things by accidentally creating the Rex Deadman. With Daiji paralyzed by fear and Yukimi injured by the Mammoth Deadman, Ikki is forced to use the Revice Driver to transform himself and his demon into Kamen Riders Revi and Vice to fight off the enemies. After naming his demon "Vice", Ikki turns down Fenix scientist George Karizaki's offer to join him so he can focus on working at his family's sentō while Yukimi recovers in the hospital.
2	"The Devil Is Just a Bad Guy!?"; Transliteration: "Akuma wa Akumade Warui Yatsu!?" (Japanese: 悪魔はあくまで悪いやつ!?)	Takayuki Shibasaki	Hanta Kinoshita	September 12, 2021
After Kadota gets demoted using the Revice Driver without proper clearance and allowing Deadmans to steal Vistamps from a Fenix research facility, Fenix commander Yujiro Wakabayashi assigns Daiji to enlist Ikki as a Fenix operative. However, Ikki refuses to budge from his decision to work at his family's sentō and partly out of fear that Vice will attack people. After the brothers are alerted to a Deadman attack at the nearby Kakahashi Golfing range instigated by Deadmans leader Orteca, Ikki transforms and destroys the Kamakiri Deadman with the Eagle Vistamp despite Vice's hi-jinks. Following a visit with Yukimi, Ikki is furious to learn Vice tempted a civilian to create the Megalodon Deadman to attack the golfing range. Ikki resolves to fight Deadmans without the Revice Driver if it means not endangering others, forcing Vice into promising to never eat people again and do as Ikki says. They proceed to fight the Deadmen with support from Fenix, using their Mega Rex remix form to destroy the Megalodon Deadman. Afterwards, Daiji collects the Megalodon Vistamp while the civilians involved reconcile their differences before being taken to a rehabilitation facility.
3	"Hostage Trouble, What Will the Brothers Do!?"; Transliteration: "Hitojichi Toraburu, Dō Suru Kyōdai!?" (Japanese: 人質トラブル、どうする兄弟！？)	Teruaki Sugihara	Hanta Kinoshita	September 19, 2021
As the Igarashis face an eviction notice and the potential loss of their sentō due to city renovations, Daiji visits Yukimi for advice. Meanwhile, despite the rest of the family agreeing to the eviction, Ikki refuses to and attempts to protest. He later runs into childhood friend, Ayaka, who Vice concludes is his girlfriend. Deadmans send a criminal to kidnap Sakura and Ayaka while the Kong Deadman provides interference. Ikki, Vice, and Daiji do their best to rescue the hostages, but to no avail. Deadmans leader Julio appears to aid the Deadman, prompting Ikki to use the Mammoth Vistamp to destroy the Kong Deadman, but Julio escapes while Sakura defeats the criminal, freeing herself and Ayaka. Though they won, Daiji feels ashamed that he was denied the opportunity to use Fenix's newly developed Demons Driver. Concurrently, the kidnapper reveals to Hiromi that he is not the Kong Deadman's contractor and was only paid to kidnap Ayaka and Sakura.
4	"Not Enough Love! A Dangerous Devil Is Born!"; Transliteration: "Tarinai Aijō! Abunai Akuma Tanjō!" (Japanese: 足りない愛情！アブナイ悪魔誕生！)	Teruaki Sugihara	Hanta Kinoshita	September 26, 2021
Despite defeating the Kong Deadman, Ikki learns the criminal who kidnapped Sakura and Ayaka is not the contractor, forcing him and Vice to find them before they can use their Vistamp to cause more trouble. However, Ikki lacks the awareness necessary to be a Kamen Rider, which upsets an impatient Daiji and strains their relationship. Meanwhile, Deadmans has uncovered a method for creating elite demons.
5	"The World-Reforming Rider! Who Is the Traitor!?"; Transliteration: "Yonaoshi Raidā! Uragirimono wa Dare da!?" (Japanese: 世直しライダー！裏切り者は誰だ！？)	Kazuya Kamihoriuchi	Hanta Kinoshita	October 3, 2021
After Ikki officially joins Fenix, his father Genta takes advantage by establishing a project to garner subscribers. Following this, an old man named Honda and his overzealous ViTuber grandson, Bon, come to Genta for help in creating their own viral videos. Bon unleashes his Deadman to assist further, but it is defeated by Kamen Riders Revi and Vice. After Bon apologizes to Ikki for creating the Deadman, most of the Vistamps Bon used are stolen from Fenix just as a new Kamen Rider appears and attacks Revi and Vice. Meanwhile, Fenix executives Yūjirō Wakabayashi and George Karizaki suspect their disgraced colleague Hiromi Kadota is the culprit. In the hopes of identifying the mysterious Kamen Rider Evil, Ikki and his friends develop a strategy involving Bon.
6	"Evil's True Identity! A Shocking Showtime!?"; Transliteration: "Ebiru no Shōtai! Shōgeki no Shōtaimu!?" (Japanese: エビルの正体！衝撃のショータイム！？)	Kazuya Kamihoriuchi	Hanta Kinoshita	October 10, 2021
Ikki helps a sentō customer who claims his younger brother is being unjustly taken to court over a traffic accident.
7	"Theft!? Skateboard!? I'm Kagero!"; Transliteration: "Settō!? Sukebō!? Ore wa Kagerō!" (Japanese: 窃盗！？スケボー！？俺はカゲロウ！)	Satoshi Morota	Hanta Kinoshita	October 17, 2021
While Ikki is dispatched to stop two of four thieves who became Phase 2 Deadmen, Kadota notices Daiji's sudden personality change. George later confirms to him that Daiji is currently being possessed by his evil inner demon, Kagero, the same culprit who framed Kadota. Feeling responsible for Daiji's downfall, and to redeem himself, Kadota is granted the means to become Kamen Rider Demons.
8	"A Family Rest, Heaven and Hell!?"; Transliteration: "Kazoku no Kyūsoku, Tengoku to Jigoku!?" (Japanese: 家族の休息、天国と地獄！？)	Satoshi Morota	Hanta Kinoshita	October 24, 2021
To celebrate Yukimi being discharged from the hospital, the Igarashis take a trip to a hot spring resort. Upon arriving however, they learn that their regular customers, the Ushijima family, are also there. Moreover, Fenix is there to monitor Daiji and Kagero and Deadmans have infiltrated the resort for mysterious purposes. Upon learning of what happened to Daiji, Ikki resolves to save his brother from Kagero.
9	"Kagero Runs Rampant! The Igarashi Brothers...Crumble!?"; Transliteration: "Kagerō Bōsō! Igarashi Kyōdai...Hōkai!?" (Japanese: カゲロウ暴走！五十嵐兄弟…崩壊！？)	Koichi Sakamoto	Hanta Kinoshita	October 31, 2021
After the Igarashi family discovers what happened to Daiji, Fenix orders Ikki to eliminate Kagero. However, the Igarashis decline, resolving to find a way to save Daiji without killing his body.
10	"Older and Younger Brother, Believing Heart"; Transliteration: "Ani to Otōto, Shinjiru Kokoro" (Japanese: 兄と弟、信じる心)	Koichi Sakamoto	Hanta Kinoshita	November 14, 2021
Despite learning that Kagero was spawned from Daiji's inferiority complex towards him, Ikki continues to fight in the hopes of reaching his brother. Meanwhile, Sakura seeks vengeance for what Deadmans has done to her family by fighting their leader Aguilera herself.
11	"Invincible Sakura, Power for What Purpose"; Transliteration: "Muteki no Sakura, Nan no Tame no Chikara" (Japanese: 無敵のさくら、何のための力)	Teruaki Sugihara	Hanta Kinoshita	November 21, 2021
Due to the increasing numbers of Deadmen-related crimes, people who receive Vistamps begin to use them in new ways. Meanwhile, wishing to join her older brothers in battle against Deadmans and to settle a personal grudge against Aguilera, Sakura receives a Driver and the Cobra Vistamp from a masked individual, much to her surprise.
12	"Weakness Is Strength!? The Invincible Jeanne!"; Transliteration: "Yowasa wa Tsuyosa!? Muteki no Jan'nu!" (Japanese: 弱さは強さ！？無敵のジャンヌ！)	Teruaki Sugihara	Hanta Kinoshita	November 28, 2021
After Sakura awakens her inner demon instead of becoming a Kamen Rider and Ikki is injured while protecting her, Daiji demands she hand over her Rider equipment to Fenix so they can investigate the person who sent them. However, a depressed Sakura runs off. Meanwhile, Deadmans member Amahiko Haitani forcibly merges Sakura's karate instructor, Seiko Ōmori, with the Planarian Deadman to achieve its Phase 2 form. Despite various difficulties, Sakura eventually succeeds in becoming Kamen Rider Jeanne, saving Ōmori, and destroying the Planarian Deadman, though Haitani escapes before Fenix can take him into custody.
13	"Fenix's Close Call!"; Transliteration: "Fenikkusu Kikiippatsu!" (Japanese: フェニックス危機一髪！)	Kazuya Kamihoriuchi	Hanta Kinoshita	December 5, 2021
Fenix is forced to land their mobile headquarters, the Sky Base, in order to refuel, restock on supplies, and give several of their operatives, such as Kadota, time off. Recognizing how vulnerable the organization will be in this state, the Igarashi siblings offer to provide protection, but George takes Ikki's equipment so he can develop a new Vistamp for him. Taking advantage of the opportunity, a Deadmans unit led by the Chameleon Deadman launches an attack on Fenix in an attempt to take their Vistamp development lab.
14	"The Commander Is...a Deadman!?"; Transliteration: "Shireikan wa...Deddoman!?" (Japanese: 司令官は…デッドマン！？)	Kazuya Kamihoriuchi	Hanta Kinoshita	December 12, 2021
Wakabayashi is suspected of being a traitor and the contract holder connected to the Chameleon Deadman. In spite of Daiji and Kadota's shock, George decides to set a trap for the Deadman to confirm. Meanwhile, Deadmans undergo preparations for Aguilera's wedding to the first demon, Giff, while Haitani and their newest member Yasushi Kudō intend to confront Sakura and Ikki respectively.
15	"Eradication! Showdown! Deadmans!"; Transliteration: "Bokumetsu! Taiketsu! Deddomanzu!" (Japanese: 撲滅！対決！デッドマンズ！)	Satoshi Morota	Hanta Kinoshita	December 19, 2021
A shocked Aguilera discovers she is intended to become a sacrifice for Giff's revival instead of his bride, which her right hand Orteca knew about and withheld from her while her bodyguard Julio becomes livid over the revelation. Meanwhile, Fenix attempts to recover after learning the Chameleon Deadman secretly murdered Wakabayashi, took his place when Ikki and Vice first transformed into Revice, and stole the Giff Stamp from them while also planning a counterattack against Deadmans. With no time left, the organization forms an uneasy alliance with Kagero, who knows where the cult's hideout is. Fenix ultimately finds Deadmans' base and defeat several of their number, though Giff absorbs Kudō and Haitani while Orteca, Aguilera, and Julio escape.
16	"Feelings to Protect... The Era of the Three Igarashi Siblings!"; Transliteration: "Mamoritai Omoi...Jidai wa Igarashi San Kyōdai!" (Japanese: 守りたい想い…時代は五十嵐三兄妹！)	Satoshi Morota	Hanta Kinoshita	December 26, 2021
Deadmans' attack has been thwarted, but Aguilera and Julio are on the run together while Orteca and the Chameleon Deadman move forward with their own plans. Along the way, Aguilera turns herself into a Deadman to prevent herself from becoming Giff's host. Concurrently, Fenix recovers Giff's casket for George to study while Sakura and Yukimi argue over whether Kamen Rider Jeanne is still needed in the fight against Deadmans.
17	"Deepening Betrayal, the True Value of a Buddy"; Transliteration: "Uragiri no Shinka, Badi no Shinka" (Japanese: 裏切りの深化、バディの真価)	Teruaki Sugihara	Hanta Kinoshita	January 9, 2022
Shortly after the Chameleon Deadman's demise and Kadota's promotion to commander, Karizaki discovers the truth behind Genta's condition. The next day, a young man named Yosuke Okuda asks Sakura to find Julio and tells her of the Deadman's past. Concurrently, while developing a new Vistamp upgrade for Ikki's Barid Rex Vistamp to prevent Giff from absorbing Gifftex Deadmen, George warns him and Vice about the risk of mastering its new power and puts them through virtual reality training. Meanwhile, Orteca is aided by an unidentified new member to reform Deadmans via armies of Gifftarians.
18	"A Buddy's Trajectory, the Miracle of Fire and Ice"; Transliteration: "Badi no Kiseki, Honō to Kōri no Kiseki" (Japanese: バディの軌跡、炎と氷の奇跡)	Teruaki Sugihara	Hanta Kinoshita	January 16, 2022
Upon learning Deadmans can use the Giff Stamp to sacrifice humans and turn them into Gifftarians, Ikki strengthens his resolve to avert Giff's revival. While his mission becomes complicated when he is consumed by his new Volcano Rex Genome form's infernal power, Vice unexpectedly steps up to save him from himself. Meanwhile, Orteca seeks to eliminate Julio for betraying Deadmans by attacking Okuda. Julio evolves into a new form, but Ikki masters Volcano Rex in time to save him and separate him from his Deadman form, which Giff absorbs.
19	"Demons Warning, Hiromi Is Surrounded!?"; Transliteration: "Demonzu Chūihō, Hiromi Hōimō!?" (Japanese: デモンズ注意報、ヒロミ包囲網!?)	Koichi Sakamoto	Nobuhiro Mouri	January 23, 2022
After Kamen Rider Revice successfully master the Volcano Rex Vistamp's power and develop the ability to separate Gifftex Deadmen from their human hosts, Orteca grows worried over the latter prospect and begins to target Kadota. Meanwhile, Kadota discovers his extended use of the Demons Driver is slowly aging him at an accelerated rate. To save his life, Fenix's doctor Akemi Mikoshiba tasks Ikki and Vice with observing Kadota and keeping him from using his Rider powers. As he mourns Wakabayashi, Kadota is visited by his old friends, Tatsuhiko Tabuchi and Chigusa Yamagiri, but realizes something is off about them. Concurrently, Julio convinces Sakura to try and help Aguilera change her ways and return to being a human.
20	"Ruthless and Temporary, the Price of Transformation"; Transliteration: "Hijō de Mujō na, Henshin no Daishō" (Japanese: 非情で無常な、変身の代償)	Koichi Sakamoto	Nobuhiro Mouri	January 30, 2022
After Yamagiri is revealed to be a traitor when she discovered dubious operations within Fenix, Kadota's condition grows worse as he starts hearing his Demons Driver telling him it will devour him. As he pleads with George for answers, Ikki learns of what is happening to his ally and the possible revelation that his next transformation could be his last. Even in spite of all of this, Kadota resolves to fight Deadmans with everything he has left. Meanwhile, Yamagiri questions Orteca about his resolve in the hopes of learning more about his true purpose.
21	"Laying Down My Life, Entrusting My Feelings"; Transliteration: "Waga Inochi o Kakete, Omoi o Takushite" (Japanese: 我が命をかけて、想いを託して)	Koichi Sakamoto	Nobuhiro Mouri	February 6, 2022
Ikki and Vice rescue Kadota from the Demons Driver, but he chooses to resign from Fenix due to his fluctuating emotions and wavering loyalty to the organization. Meanwhile, Fenix has captured Orteca, who has been separated from his Deadman form, though they are unaware that he intends to steal the Demons Driver for himself nor their director-general, Hideo Akaishi, is in league with Orteca. Concurrently, Sakura is invited over to the Ushijimas' home despite turning them down several times initially. However, she soon learns they are part of a separate organization called Weekend and they were the ones who gave her her Rider powers. While making his escape, Orteca throws Kadota off a cliff and overpowers the remaining Riders, proving himself the superior version of Demons.
22	"Slam-Bang... Kūki Kaidan!?"; Transliteration: "Dottan Battan...Kūki Kaidan!?" (Japanese: ドッタンバッタン…空気階段！？)	Takayuki Shibasaki	Hanta Kinoshita	February 13, 2022
After losing Kadota to Orteca, Ikki buries himself in his sentō work to distance himself from the tragedy. After he is approached by talent agency members who have been attacked by Deadmans, Ikki and Vice go undercover as a comedy duo to investigate. Meanwhile, Aguilera decides to confront Orteca herself after discovering his true colors and saving Sakura from the Ushijimas and Weekend. Concurrently, Julio decides to investigate Fenix once again to see if they have any connection to Giff as well as warn George and Daiji about Akaishi's true allegiance.
23	"Vice Takes Over... Betrayal After All!?"; Transliteration: "Baisu ga Nottori...Yappari Uragiri!?" (Japanese: バイスが乗っ取り…やっぱり裏切り！？)	Takayuki Shibasaki	Hanta Kinoshita	February 20, 2022
Following a mishap with the unsanctioned Rolling Vistamp, Ikki and Vice switch corporeal states. Overjoyed by his new state of being, the latter goes rogue to destroy the Vistamp and make the switch permanent. Against Daiji and Sakura's wishes, an angry George leads Fenix in pursuing Vice in retaliation for the demon using a Vistamp that was developed by the same person who gave Sakura her Libera Driver. Meanwhile, Julio becomes an alcoholic after Aguilera betrays him for Giff until Genta and Mitsuo find him and offer to let him stay with them. Upon hearing of what happened to Julio, Daiji and Sakura decide to make Aguilera pay for what she did. However, Kagero returns to express his anger over their treatment of Julio and reveal the true allegiance of Fenix's leaders.
24	"Reversed by Dr. Karizaki! An Inverse Operation!"; Transliteration: "Karizaki-hakase no Modose! Abekobe Daisakusen!" (Japanese: 狩崎博士の戻せ！あべこべ大作戦！)	Kazuya Kamihoriuchi	Nobuhiro Mouri	February 27, 2022
Following Kagero's testimony regarding Fenix and Giff, George decides to investigate them once more while helping Ikki and Vice reverse the Rolling Vistamp's side effects. However, he is captured by Orteca, who seeks his help in unlocking the Demons Driver's full potential. Sakura and Julio join forces to save him as well as attempt to convince Aguilera not to trust Orteca. Despite their efforts, Orteca brutally defeats them and mocks them for being too friendly, which he believes makes them weak. Just as Orteca is about to finish them off, Weekend saves them before revealing the truth about Fenix and Giff and that Aguilera is actually investigating Orteca's past and his true intentions in order to protect Julio.
25	"Revival! Vail!? Memories of the Igarashi Family"; Transliteration: "Yomigaeru! Beiru!? Igarashi-ke no Kioku" (Japanese: よみがえる！ベイル！？五十嵐家の記憶)	Kazuya Kamihoriuchi	Hanta Kinoshita	March 6, 2022
After learning Fenix's true colors from Weekend and being saved by Sakura and Julio, George confronts Orteca to regain the stolen Stamps due to their side effects. However, Orteca refuses and attempts to use the stamps to destroy the Igarashis, resulting in the appearance of Kamen Rider Vail. Concurrently, Sakura confronts Aguilera over her decisions while George and Vice learn of the Igarashis' past.
26	"Showdown! Farewell!? The End of Darkness and Light"; Transliteration: "Taiketsu! Ketsubetsu!? Yami to Hikari no Ketsumatsu" (Japanese: 対決！決別！？闇と光の結末)	Hidenori Ishida	Hanta Kinoshita	March 13, 2022
Following Genta Igarashi's sudden transformation into Kamen Rider Vail, the Igarashi siblings discover they are Giff's descendants through their father as their inner demons' connection to the original demon grows stronger. All three grow anxious over this, with Daiji growing fearful of what Vail has done to Genta while facing Kagero once more. In the hopes of relieving their anxiety, George develops two new Vistamps for Daiji and Ikki respectively, as well as confronts Akaishi. Meanwhile, Aguilera decides to eliminate Orteca and protect Sakura and her brothers upon learning of the Igarashis' heritage over Julio's concerns that Aguilera is overusing her power.
27	"Stop! Tyrant's Mayhem and Violence Gone Wild"; Transliteration: "Tomero! Bōkun no Bōkyo to Bōryoku no Bōsō" (Japanese: 止めろ！暴君の暴挙と暴力の暴走)	Hidenori Ishida	Hanta Kinoshita	March 20, 2022
Akaishi reveals Julio, Orteca, and Aguilera are test subjects used by NOAH, a group of criminal scientists who seek to use Giff's cells to turn humans into demons, and that he has been using Fenix to transform its soldiers into demons. Following Giff's initial awakening, Masumi tells the Igarashi family what Vail has done to them in the past while he and Weekend attempt to stop Ikki and Vice from fighting until they have found a solution to stop Giff from corrupting them. As Ikki and Vice resolve to face the threat in spite of their injuries, Aguilera and Julio work to save Fenix from Akaishi's plot as Orteca commences a mass sacrifice to hasten Giff's revival.
28	"Overcoming Fear at Lightning Speed! Believe in Yourself as One!"; Transliteration: "Osore o Koete Shippūjinrai! Onore o Shinji Isshindōtai!" (Japanese: 怖れを超えて疾風迅雷！己を信じ一心同体！)	Hidenori Ishida	Hanta Kinoshita	March 27, 2022
As Giff's awakening approaches, Vice starts to go berserk within Ikki and escapes Weekend's custody. While Daiji and Sakura hold off Vice, George becomes the third Kamen Rider Demons to use a new Vistamp he developed to purify Vice of Giff's corruption. In the process, he admits to Daiji and Sakura that he joined Fenix to get revenge on NOAH for sanctioning his father's experiments, but that the truth of the Igarashis' heritage caused him to let go of his revenge in order to support them. In time, George completes the Thunder Gale Vistamp and gets it to Ikki, who uses it to cure Vice and fuse together to become Kamen Rider Revice so they can defeat Orteca, who is absorbed by Giff.
29	"Crank-in! Memory of Hiromi!"; Transliteration: "Kuranku In! Memorī Obu Hiromī!" (Japanese: クランクイン！メモリー・オブ・ヒロミー！)	Koichiro Hayama	Hiroki Uchida	April 3, 2022
Sometime after Vice's rescue, Orteca's demise, and Genta's self-exile to suppress Vail, George and the Igarashi siblings discover Kadota is alive, albeit suffering from amnesia. To recover his memories, George suggests the siblings make a memorial film about Kadota's past life. Concurrently, the Japanese government is calling for several Fenix members' arrests due to their connection to NOAH while Julio and Sakura attempt to find Aguilera, who has become a most wanted fugitive.
30	"Voice Actor! Say Me! The Aftermath of Youth"; Transliteration: "Seiyū! Sei Mī! Seishun no Atoshimatsu" (Japanese: 声優！SAY ME！青春のあとしまつ)	Teruaki Sugihara	Hanta Kinoshita	April 10, 2022
While at his high school soccer club reunion, Ikki reunites with his former coach and mentor Subaru Kimura, who is now a famous voice actor. He also meets his old schoolmate Kōji "Zico" Ikeyama, who is currently training in voice work under Subaru. When Ikki asks him if he has quit soccer, Zico storms off to his confusion. Before he can investigate further, however, a new Deadman attacks.
31	"Illusionary Guidance, Dream Afterwards"; Transliteration: "Gensō no Michibiki, Yume no Atosaki" (Japanese: 幻想の導き、夢のあとさき)	Teruaki Sugihara	Hanta Kinoshita	April 17, 2022
Having inhaled the Rafflesia Deadman's gas, Ikki begins to hallucinate fighting a revived Kudō while unknowingly destroying Shiawaseyu. While in this state, he and Vice discover Zico's true reasoning for his anger towards Ikki's leaving the soccer team. Meanwhile, with help from Julio and a Fenix squad member, the Igarashis are able to restrain Ikki, shortly before Kimura discovers what is happening. As he denies Ikki's past allegations, Daiji suspects Zico might be the Rafflesia Deadman's contractor. After Zico is attacked by the Deadman however, Kimura is revealed to be the contractor, who wanted to help his students reconcile their past. As the Rafflesia Deadman betrays him and goes on a rampage, Ikki and Zico wake up in time for the former and Vice to destroy the monster while Kimura willingly turns himself into Fenix's custody.
32	"Lost Place, Queen's Pride"; Transliteration: "Ushinatta Ibasho, Joō no Puraido" (Japanese: 失った居場所、女王のプライド)	Satoshi Morota	Hanta Kinoshita	April 24, 2022
After Sakura joined Weekend and meets with Genta before he goes into hiding, she and Julio encounter Aguilera as she finally resurfaces from her self-imposed exile over being forsaken by Giff. However, Aguilera is acting strange as she attacks Sakura. Meanwhile, Daiji and Mikoshiba investigate Akaishi.
33	"Lovekov's Rebellion!? Sakura's Resolution"; Transliteration: "Rabukofu Hankō!? Sakura no Kakugo" (Japanese: ラブコフ反抗！？さくらの覚悟)	Satoshi Morota	Hanta Kinoshita	May 1, 2022
As Lovekov suddenly becomes unresponsive to Sakura's commands, the latter must re-learn her missing motivation before freeing Aguilera from her Deadman form. In response, Vice enters Sakura's mind to have a private talk with Lovekov to find out why she is being unresponsive. While Daiji confronts Akaishi and discovers his true nature and Akemi's whereabouts, Ikki and Vice are confronted by Vail after using Giff's power to reacquire his physical form.
34	"The Demon Calls the Demon"; Transliteration: "Akuma ga Akuma o Yondeiru" (Japanese: 悪魔が悪魔を呼んでいる)	Hidenori Ishida	Nobuhiro Mouri	May 8, 2022
After Aguilera's humanity is restored, she joins Weekend and becomes friends with Sakura. The Igarashi siblings regroup with their allies to stop Akaishi from increasing Giff's power and save Akemi. On Weekend's behalf and in response to the impending demon apocalypse, George buys time to develop new Vistamps capable of countering Vail, Akaishi, and Giff. Elsewhere, Vice grows worried that his time with Ikki is coming to an end and confronts his father, Vail, to stop him from murdering Genta's children.
35	"Unknown Threat, the Way People Should Go"; Transliteration: "Michi Naru Kyōi, Hito no Susumu beki Michi" (Japanese: 未知なる脅威、人の進むべき道)	Hidenori Ishida	Nobuhiro Mouri	May 15, 2022
The Igarashi siblings, George, and Weekend must recoordinate their plan to save Akemi, who has fallen into darkness, and prevent Akaishi from announcing his plan to bring about a demon apocalypse on Earth. As the heroes' situation worsens when Akaishi, Giff, and Vail decimate a majority of Fenix's forces, Hikaru is able to convince George to give him grant the upgraded Demons Driver and the Kuwagata Vistamp to transform into Kamen Rider Over Demons and save their overwhelmed allies from certain death.
36	"Humanity at the Crossroads, Each One's Determination"; Transliteration: "Kiro ni Tatsu Jinrui, Sorezore no Ketsui" (Japanese: 岐路に立つ人類、それぞれの決意)	Takayuki Shibasaki	Hanta Kinoshita	May 22, 2022
Following Akaishi's announcement of an impending demon apocalypse and the destruction of Fenix's Sky Base, the remaining survivors develop demon removal stamps to combat Giff, but accidentally create stamps that have the opposite effect. Meanwhile, Ikki receives a report before Genta arrives and reveals his intention to confront Vail as he feels responsible for his role in his former inner demon's existence. Concurrently, Weekend develops the Week EnDriver and the Buffalo Vistamp for Julio, but Vail kidnaps him and steals his new Vistamp, leading to Aguilera using the driver with her Vistamp and taking Julio's place.
37	"Inevitable Fierce Battle! The Risky Demon Recapture Mission!"; Transliteration: "Gekisen Hisshi! Kesshi no Akuma Dakkan Misshon!" (Japanese: 激戦必至！決死の悪魔奪還ミッション！)	Takayuki Shibasaki	Hanta Kinoshita	May 29, 2022
In response to Giff's full scale invasion of Earth and Fenix's failed demon removal stamps, Weekend publicly reveals themselves to the world and urges civilians to rebel against Akaishi and his lies, despite the risk. Meanwhile, as they are working on a solution to free Akemi from her Giffdemos form, Daiji becomes concerned about his ability to protect world peace. While George upgrades the Barix Rex Vistamp to allow Vice to transform into a similar version of Ikki's Barid Rex Genome, Ikki recalls that Akemi's will remains intact and she potentially left a clue to defeat Giff.
38	"Father and Son Weaving Together! The Ultimate Revice!"; Transliteration: "Chichi to Ko ga Tsumugu! Kyūkyoku no Ribaisu!" (Japanese: 父と子が紡ぐ！究極のリバイス！)	Takayuki Shibasaki	Hanta Kinoshita	June 5, 2022
Shortly after Akaishi murders Akemi, the Karizakis struggle to create a new Vistamp to counter the revived Giff until Genta confronts his children before allowing himself to be used in the creation of the Giffard Rex Vistamp for Revice. Meanwhile, Hiromi returns to support his allies in the wake of Akemi's death, having fully recovered his memories with the help of Weekend, which he has joined as an advisor.
39	"Hope and Despair, the Conflict Between Three Siblings"; Transliteration: "Kibō to Zetsubō, San Kyōdai no Kattō" (Japanese: 希望と絶望、三兄妹の葛藤)	Kazuya Kamihoriuchi	Nobuhiro Mouri	June 12, 2022
With Genta surviving a cell transfusion surgery, the Karizakis create the Giffard Rex Vistamp, which Ikki and Vice use to become Kamen Rider Ultimate Revice and give humanity hope and inspire citizens to either join Weekend in fighting Giff's tyranny or build shelters across the city. Furious, Akaishi begins his plot to invade Weekend's base. Meanwhile, Daiji leads a demon army to the resistance's base at ARARAT by forcing civilians to go there and obey Giff's orders, sparking a fierce conflict between Daiji and his siblings. Elsewhere, George successfully mass-produces two copies of the Demons Driver and entrusts them to Hiromi.
40	"Family or the World... A Brothers Quarrel of the Soul!"; Transliteration: "Kazoku ka Sekai ka...Tamashii no Kyōdai Genka!" (Japanese: 家族か世界か…魂の兄弟喧嘩！)	Kazuya Kamihoriuchi	Nobuhiro Mouri	June 19, 2022
Because of Daiji's stubbornness towards walking to a devil's path and betraying his allies and family, Weekend has marked him an enemy in retaliation. As Weekend agent Hikaru blames Tasuke for their fellow agent Kimiko's death at the hands of a Hell Gifftarian, Ikki decides to confront Daiji to save the latter from himself.
41	"A Father's True Intention, a Son's Determination!"; Transliteration: "Chichi no Shin'i, Musuko no Ketsui!" (Japanese: 父の真意、息子の決意！)	Teruaki Sugihara	Hanta Kinoshita	June 26, 2022
After learning of Kagero's death and its negative effect on Daiji's emotions and judgment, Genta intends to settle his conflict with Vail on his own. Meanwhile, despite Tasuke's sacrifice to save his allies, Hiromi uses the mass-produced Demons Drivers he received from George to form the Kamen Rider Demons Corps. and increase the resistance's ranks against Giff's army.
42	"Fierce Battle! Crimson Vail and Destream"; Transliteration: "Geki Batoru! Akaki Beiru to Desutorīmu" (Japanese: 激バトル！紅きベイルとデストリーム)	Teruaki Sugihara	Hanta Kinoshita	July 3, 2022
After receiving a modified Vail Driver from George, Genta intends to settle the score with a weakened Vail by transforming into Kamen Rider Destream and facing the demon in combat. Meanwhile, Sakura attempts to stop Daiji's rampage as Ikki and Vice fight against Akaishi.
43	"The End of Eternity, Where Regret Leads"; Transliteration: "Eien no Owari, Kōkai no Mukau Saki" (Japanese: 永遠の終わり、後悔の向かう先)	Teruaki Sugihara	Hanta Kinoshita	July 10, 2022
While Genta and Vail reconcile with each other following their battle and Daiji is about to rejoin his family, Giff interrupts the reunion with a revived Akaishi as a Gigademos and launches an attack on ARARAT. Despite knowing the risk of losing his memories during the battle, Ikki swears to protect the world at all costs.
44	"Laying Down My Body and Soul, the Path of the Decision"; Transliteration: "Zenshinzenrei o Kakete, Ketsudan no Yukue" (Japanese: 全身全霊をかけて、決断の行方)	Takayuki Shibasaki	Hanta Kinoshita	July 17, 2022
While Hikaru successfully defeats Akaishi and avenges Kimiko and Tasuke, he loses his compatibility with the Over Demons system before he finish him. However, Daiji kills Akaishi and shocks everyone with his intention to take over the latter's role as Giff's right hand. Vice manages to prevent Daiji from forming a pact with Giff, only to be dragged into Giff's dimension, where he learns Giff's true goals. While Vice eventually escapes with Oreteca's help, Hiromi resumes the mantle of Kamen Rider Demons despite his condition to get Daiji back to his senses. Meanwhile, Masumi's condition worsens after resealing Vail in the Demons Driver and transferring his inner demon to George.
45	"Never-Ending Nightmare, Protectors and the Protected"; Transliteration: "Owaranu Akumu, Mamoru Mono to Mamorareru Mono" (Japanese: 終わらぬ悪夢、守る者と守られる者)	Hidenori Ishida	Hanta Kinoshita	July 24, 2022
Weekend continues on following Masumi's passing as they immediately arrest Orteca. However, Giff returns after breaking out of his dimension and spawns parasites from the cocoons of the previous human sacrifices he once sealed for his revival to infiltrate humans' minds and separate their inner demons to spread more of them to the rest of humanity barring the Igarashi siblings. Though the non-Igarashi Riders are able to resist being infected while transformed, Giff turns Vice into his thrall.
46	"Courage to Face Each Other... What Should You Really Protect?"; Transliteration: "Mukiau Yūki...Shin ni Mamoru beki Mono wa Nani?" (Japanese: 向き合う勇気…真に護るべきものは何？)	Hidenori Ishida	Hanta Kinoshita	July 31, 2022
While Vice mentally struggles against Giff, the heroes learn that defeating Giff's demons and freeing the previous victims who were used for the demon's revival spreads his parasites at a faster rate. While George immerses himself in "certain research", Hikaru chooses Tamaki to take his place as the user of the Over Demons system. On Aguilera's advice, Sakura helps Lovekov evolve from her "weak existence" and achieve a new power that turns Sakura's inner demon into her armor.
47	"Karizaki's Rebellion, the Price of Transformation"; Transliteration: "Karizaki no Hanran, Henshin no Daishō" (Japanese: 狩崎の反乱、変身の代償)	Kazuya Kamihoriuchi	Hanta Kinoshita	August 7, 2022
With Giff finally defeated properly, the Igarashis and their allies intend to have a peaceful day while Fenix reforms under new management and merges with Weekend. Unbeknownst to everyone, Masumi's inner demon Chic has fully awakened and possessed George to develop new Rider systems without the need for inner demons. Despite managing to separate himself from Chic while testing his new system, the former suddenly goes insane and attacks his allies as Kamen Rider Juuga. Following this, Ikki's family members discover the truth about his condition, which stems from the overuse of his Rider powers.
48	"Proof of Determination! This Is...Japan's No. 1 Busybody!"; Transliteration: "Kakugo no Shōmei! Kore ga...Nihon'ichi no Osekkai!" (Japanese: 覚悟の証明！これが…日本一のお節介！)	Kazuya Kamihoriuchi	Hanta Kinoshita	August 14, 2022
After barely escaping from Juuga, the Igarashi siblings learn from Hiromi that he discovered the truth behind George's rampage. Meanwhile, despite his worsening amnesia, Ikki ignores his family and Vice's warnings to continue fighting.
49	"At the End of the Battle... Only the Demon Remains"; Transliteration: "Tatakai no Hate...Nokotta no wa Akuma dake" (Japanese: 戦いの果て…残ったのは悪魔だけ)	Takayuki Shibasaki	Hanta Kinoshita	August 21, 2022
Though George relents after finally making peace with his father with help from Hiromi, Ikki loses all memory of his family and pursues a normal life with Vice. However, Vice and Genta join forces to restore Ikki's memories by exploiting a loophole in Vice's contract with Ikki, albeit with potential consequences.
50 (Finale)	"Family to the End, Until the Day We Meet Again"; Transliteration: "Akumade Kazoku, Itsuka Mata Au Hi made" (Japanese: あくまで家族、いつかまた会う日まで)	Takayuki Shibasaki	Hanta Kinoshita	August 28, 2022
Vice pretends to be a villain to restore Ikki's memories at the potential risk of destroying himself once his contract with Ikki is undone. Meanwhile, the rest of Ikki's family and various people he and Vice helped in the past assist Vice and Genta as they come to a final decision.
