= Tokiwa-sō =

Former apartment building in Tokyo, Japan

Coordinates: 35°43′27″N 139°41′18″E

- トキワ荘
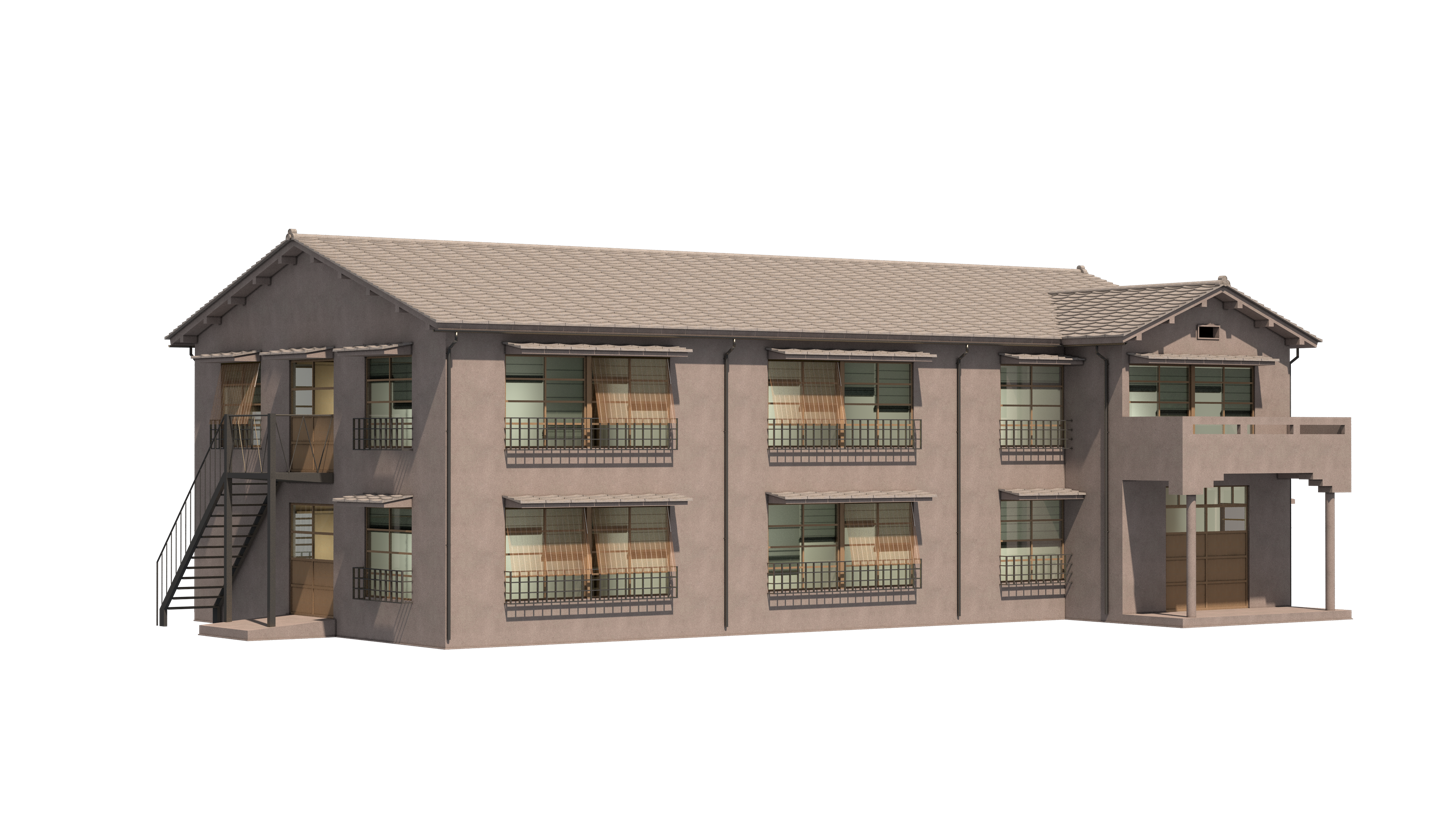
- 3D recreation of Tokiwa-sō

General information
- Status: Demolished
- Type: Residential
- Location: 3-16-6 Minami-Nagasaki, Toshima, Tokyo 171-0052, Japan
- Completed: December 6, 1952
- Demolished: November 29, 1982

Technical details
- Floor count: 2

Tokiwa-sō (Japanese: トキワ荘, Hepburn: Tokiwa-sō) was an apartment building in Toshima, Tokyo, Japan famous for being the early living-quarters of many prominent manga artists.

== Description ==
Tokiwa-sō was a Japanese style no-frills apartment building, two stories high, built of wood. It was one of the pre-war buildings which survived the fire bombing of Tokyo during World War II and became part of the nucleus of the Minami Nagasaki residential area of Toshima ward. It had no baths, only cold water sinks and toilets. Residents went to local sentō bath houses, the Tsuru-yu and the Akebono-yu (now modern condominiums).

The building existed as a sort of atelier from 1952 to 1982. It was demolished in 1982. It is now the site of Nihon Kajo Publishing.

== Notable residents and relation to manga and anime ==
The second floor of this building housed many young budding artists in the late 1950s to the early 1960s, including Osamu Tezuka between 1953 and 1954. Residents included Hiroo Terada (1953–1957), Fujiko Fujio (1954–1961), Suzuki Shinichi (1955–1956), Naoya Moriyasu (1956), Shotaro Ishinomori (1956–1961), Fujio Akatsuka (1956–1961), Tokuo Yokota (1958–1961), Hideko Mizuno (1958) and George Yamaguchi (1960–1962).

Tezuka offered a room to the writing duo Fujiko Fujio when he was moving out. Fujiko Fujio would make similar gestures themselves, offering rooms to rookie artists whenever one was made available, including to Akatsuka and Ishinomori.

The business of manga production today in Japan has a prototype in the collaborative activities pioneered at Tokiwa-sō. According to Tam Bing Man (one of the acting duo), who was an assistant of Osamu Tezuka in earliest days, Tezuka first introduced this production system employing many assistants to make manga, in order to meet the deadlines of publishing in weekly manga magazines. This model of several assistants helping a main artist is still used today, providing young manga artists with training.

== Related, similar buildings and museum ==
Toshima City's Culture and Tourism Division built a bronze monument titled Heroes of Tokiwa-sō (トキワ荘のヒーローたち, Tokiwa-sō no Hīrō-tachi) in Minami-Nagasaki Hanasaki Koen public park in April 2009. Standing 300 meters (980 ft) from where the original building stood, it consists of self-portraits and autographs of 10 former Tokiwa-sō residents, with a small model of the building on top. Townspeople initially imagined a monument featuring famous characters created by Tokiwa-sō residents, such as Astro Boy and Doraemon, but had negotiation troubles with copyrights. In 2012, the publishing house that stands on the original plot installed a stone monument to Tokiwa-sō on its grounds with a replica of the building on top.

The Tokiwa-sō Project was started in 2006 to help aspiring manga artists begin their professional careers, including offering housing assistance. By 2016, they have helped more than 60 artists make their debut.

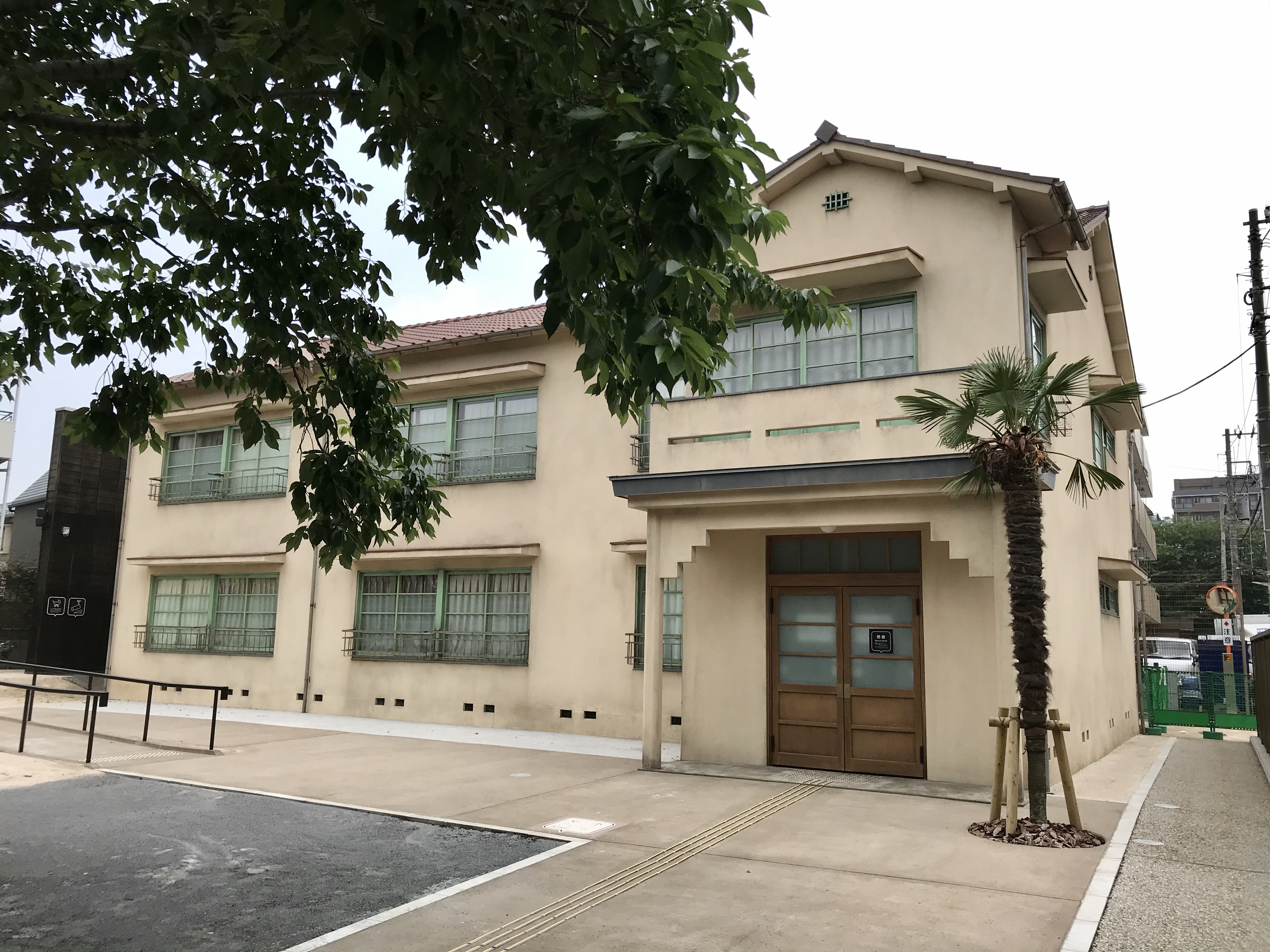
Tokiwa-sō Manga Museum, 2020

Kyoto's Kamigyō ward refurbished a century-old, two-story row house into their own Tokiwa-sō for aspiring manga artists. It was unveiled on August 23, 2013. In February 2015, the Niigata City government announced plans to open a rent-free house for up-and-coming female manga artists modeled after Tokiwa-sō called Komachi House. Instructors from the Japan Animation and Manga College will give lessons to tenants of the house in Chūō-ku, in return for the artists working on projects led by the city government.

In July 2016, the Toshima ward government announced plans to build a replica of Tokiwa-sō in Minami-Nagasaki Hanasaki Koen public park, a three-minute walk from the original, with a museum dedicated to manga and anime inside that was scheduled to open in March 2020. The Toshima government planned to spend between 200 million and 300 million yen (~US $1.98 million to $2.98 million) on the project with plans created by a committee of people involved in the original Tokiwa-sō, led by Machiko Satonaka. Delayed due to the COVID-19 pandemic in Japan, the museum officially opened on July 7, 2020, and recreates the original building meticulously, down to fake mold.

== Gallery ==
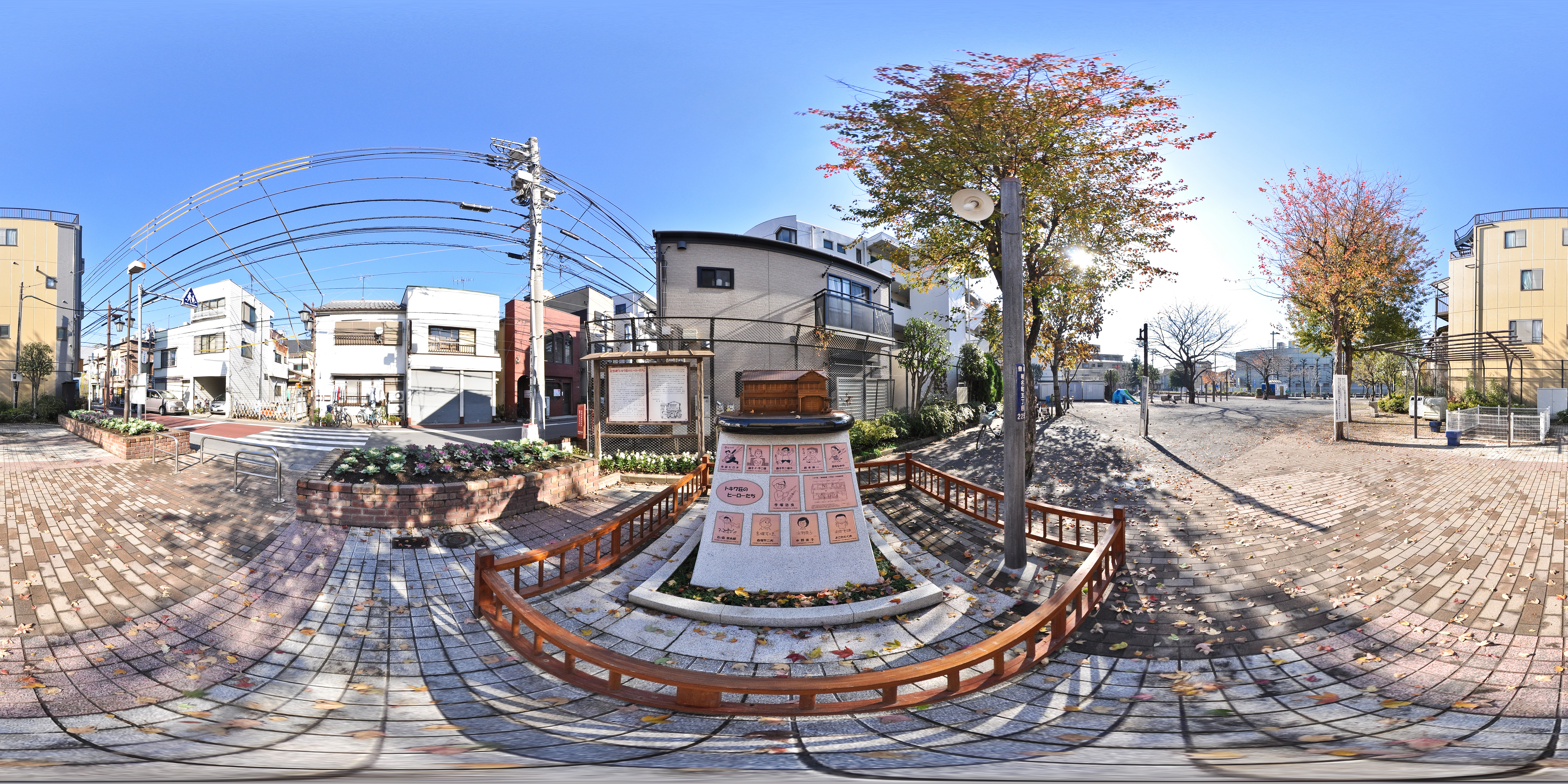
The Heroes of Tokiwa-sō memorial in Minami-Nagasaki Hanasaki Koen. (view as a 360° interactive panorama)

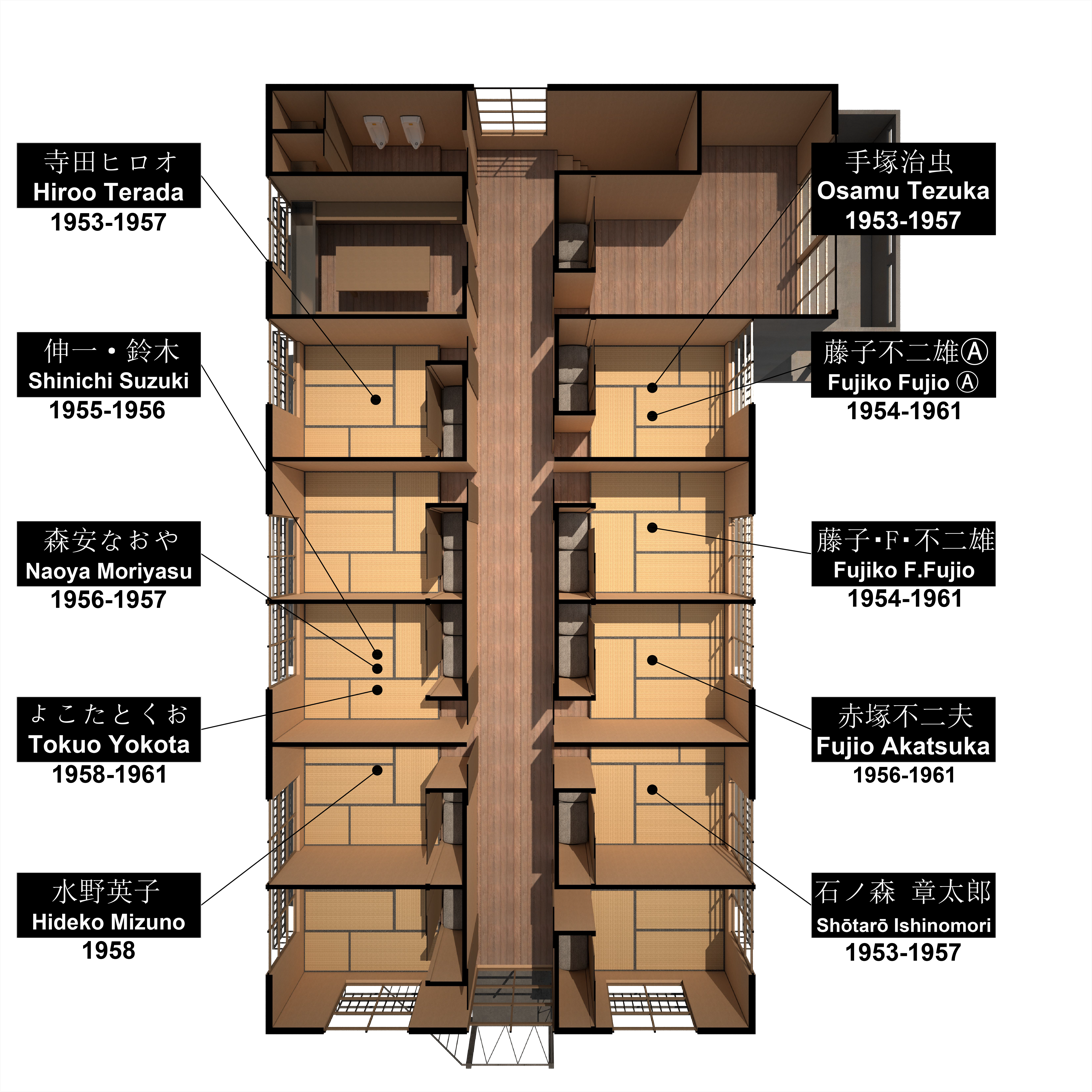
Diagram of the second floor, noting the rooms of some notable residents.

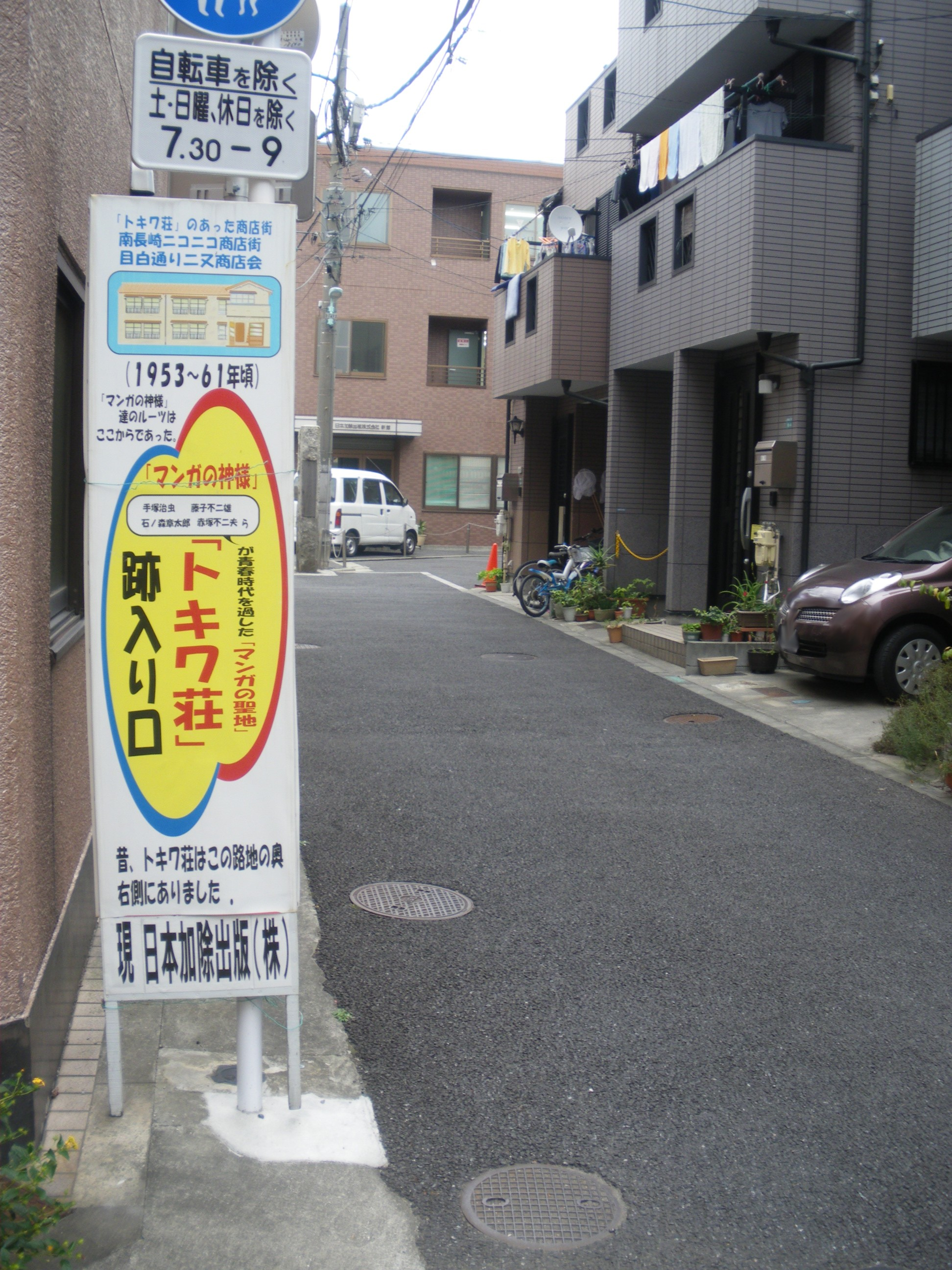
Alley entrance to the former site of Tokiwa-sō as marked with a sign, 2009
