= Uncivilized Books =

American alternative comics company

- Founded: 2009; 17 years ago
- Founder: Tom Kaczynski
- Country of origin: U.S.A.
- Headquarters location: Minneapolis, Minnesota
- Distribution: Consortium Book Sales & Distribution; Diamond Comic Distributors; Lunar Distribution
- Publication types: Graphic novels, Comic books, Books
- Nonfiction topics: Autobiography, Memoir, Criticism
- Fiction genres: Alternative
- Imprints: Uncivilized Comics; ODOD Books; Mangalith
- Official website: uncivilizedbooks.com

Uncivilized Books is a publisher in the comics industry based in Minneapolis. The company's owner and founder is cartoonist Tom Kaczynski (known familiarly as "Tom K."). The company is known for its literary publications; many of the company's titles have been nominated for awards within the comic book industry.

== History ==
Tom Kaczynski, an émigré from Poland, is a cartoonist, illustrator, and former architecture student. Uncivilized Books traces its origins date back to 2007 when Kaczynski began self-publishing his minicomics under the label. (The name "Uncivilized" was chosen to reflect both the outsider status of comics in mainstream culture and historical notions of civilization.) To facilitate his desire to publish, Kaczynski quit his advertising job and moved back to Minneapolis from New York City.

At that time, major independent publishers like Drawn & Quarterly and Fantagraphics were moving away from comic book pamphlets, focusing instead on graphic novels. This shift left many cartoonists, including Gabrielle Bell —whose series Lucky was discontinued after two issues — seeking alternative platforms for their work. (Kaczynski and Bell previously knew each other as members of the Artists With Problems group in New York.)

In 2009, Kaczynski transitioned Uncivilized into a full-fledged publishing house, beginning with the release of Bell's one-shot L.A. Diary. The minicomic debuted at the 2009 Rain Taxi Book Festival, establishing Uncivilized Books as a publisher committed to high-quality independent comics.

Between 2009 and 2011, Uncivilized Books expanded its minicomics catalog, collaborating with artists such as Jon Lewis and Dan Wieken while continuing Bell’s diary comics and Kaczynski’s own Cartoon Dialectics. Lewis contributed True Swamp and Klagen: A Horror, utilizing Print Gocco techniques, while Wieken produced art zines like The Booke of Logos. Kaczynski also released new works, including Vague Cities. This period solidified Uncivilized Books’ role in the independent comics scene.

== Publications ==
Uncivilized Books has three imprints, including Unicivilized Comics, which produces pamphlets and minicomics, and ODOD Books, which releases the company's all-ages titles. In addition to original graphic novels, the company has also published a few books of comics criticism and history. Finally, Uncivilized Books publishes the Structures zine series, in which artists are asked to contribute 11 designs for new structures. In April 2026, Uncivilized Books launched Mangalith, an imprint for publishing manga series translated into English. The first release under this imprint will be Hideko Mizuno's Fire! in October.

== Awards ==
- 2018 AML Awards for Comics for Noah Van Sciver's One Dirty Tree
- 2019 Eisner Award for Best Academic/Scholarly Work for Sweet Little Cunt: The Graphic Work of Julie Doucet by Anne Elizabeth Moore
- 2024 The Pigskin Peters: The Doug Wright Award for Best Small- or Micro-Press Book for Tyler Landry's Old Caves

=== Nominations ===
- 2011 Ignatz Award for Outstanding Minicomic for Tom Kaczynski's Trans-Utopia
- 2013 Eisner Award for Best Single Issue/One-Shot for James Romberger and Crosby's Post York #1
- 2014 Eisner Award for Best U.S. Edition of International Material for David Beauchard's Incidents in the Night, Book One
- 2015:
  - Eisner Award for Best Reality-Based Work for MariNaomi's Dragon’s Breath and Other True Stories, co-published with 2d Cloud
  - Doug Wright Awards' Spotlight Award (aka The Nipper) for Sophie Yanow's War of Streets and Houses
- 2017 Eisner Award for Best Academic/Scholarly Work for Marc Sobel's Brighter Than You Think: Ten Short Works by Alan Moore
- 2018 Harvey Award for Book of the Year for Gabrielle Bell's Everything is Flammable
- 2019 Eisner Award for Best Reality-Based Work for Noah Van Sciver's One Dirty Tree
- 2021 Eisner Award for Best Graphic Memoir for Craig Thompson's Ginseng Roots

== Selected titles ==
=== Comics ===
- Gabrielle Bell:
  - L.A. Diary (2009)
  - July Diary (2012)
  - My Dog Ivy (2019)
  - My Dog Jojo (2021)
- Jenna Cha and Lonnie Nadler. The Sickness (7 issues, 2023–present)
- Tom Kaczynski. Cartoon Dialectics vol. 1 (4 issues, 2009–present)
- Jon Lewis. True Swamp (2 issues, 2011–?) — collects material originally published online from Spring 2010
- James Romberger (w, a). Post York, no. 1 (2012). — came packaged with a CD by Romberger's son Crosby
- Zak Sally (w, a). Sammy the Mouse, no. 2 (2013).
- Craig Thompson. Ginseng Roots (11 issues, 2019–2020)

=== Graphic novels ===
- Beauchard, David (2013). Incidents in the Night, Book One.
- Bell, Gabrielle (2012). The Voyeurs. ISBN 978-0-984681-40-2.
- — (2014). Truth is Fragmentary: Travelogues & Diaries. ISBN 978-0-988901-45-2.
- — (April 2017). Everything is Flammable. ISBN 978-1941250181.
- — (2020). Inappropriate. ISBN 978-1941250389.
- Dawson, Mike (2016). Rules for Dating My Daughter.
- Huizenga, Kevin; Beyond, Leon; Zettwoch, Dan (2013). Amazing Facts and Beyond.
- Kaczynski, Tom (2010). Trans-Utopia.
- Landry, Tyler (2023). Old Caves.
- Lewis, Jon (November 2012). True Swamp: Choose Your Poison. — collects material from Dark Horse Presents #100-101 (Dark Horse, Aug. 1995), True Swamp vol. 2, #1–3 (Peristaltic Press, Feb.–July 1994), True Swamp vol. 2, #4–5 (Slave Labor Graphics, Oct. 1994–Feb. 1995), and True Swamp vol. 1, #1 (Jon Lewis, Sept. 1992)
- Madden, Matt (2021). Ex Libris: A Comic. ISBN 978-1-941250-44-0.
- MariNaomi (2014). Dragon’s Breath and Other True Stories. — co-published with 2d Cloud
- Neyestani, Mana (December 2, 2014). An Iranian Metamorphosis. ISBN 978-0988901445.
- — (2019). The Oven.
- Rostovsky, Peter (2023). Damnation Diaries.
- Samancı, Özge (2024). Evil Eyes Sea.
- Sfar, Joann (2016). Pascin.
- Shaw, Dash (2013). New Jobs.
- Thompson, Craig (2020). Ginseng Roots. — collects all 12 issues of Ginseng Roots
- Van Sciver, Noah (2018). One Dirty Tree.
- Willberg, Kriota (2018). Draw Stronger: Self-Care For Cartoonists & Other Visual Artists.
- Yanow, Sophie (2014). War of Streets and Houses.

=== Prose/academic books ===
- Evenson, Brian (2014). Ed Vs. Yummy Fur. — book detailing the differences between the various versions of the Ed the Happy Clown narrative
- Moore, Anne Elizabeth (2018). Sweet Little Cunt: The Graphic Work of Julie Doucet.
- Sobel, Marc (2016). Brighter Than You Think: Ten Short Works by Alan Moore.

=== Structures zine series ===
- Structures 1-11 (issue #1), by Tom Kaczynski
- Structures 12-23 (issue #2) by Vincent Stall
- Structures 24-34 (issue #3) (2013), by Michael DeForge

=== Manga ===
- Fire! by Hideko Mizuno (2026–scheduled)
