= Jenna Cha =

American comic book writer and artist

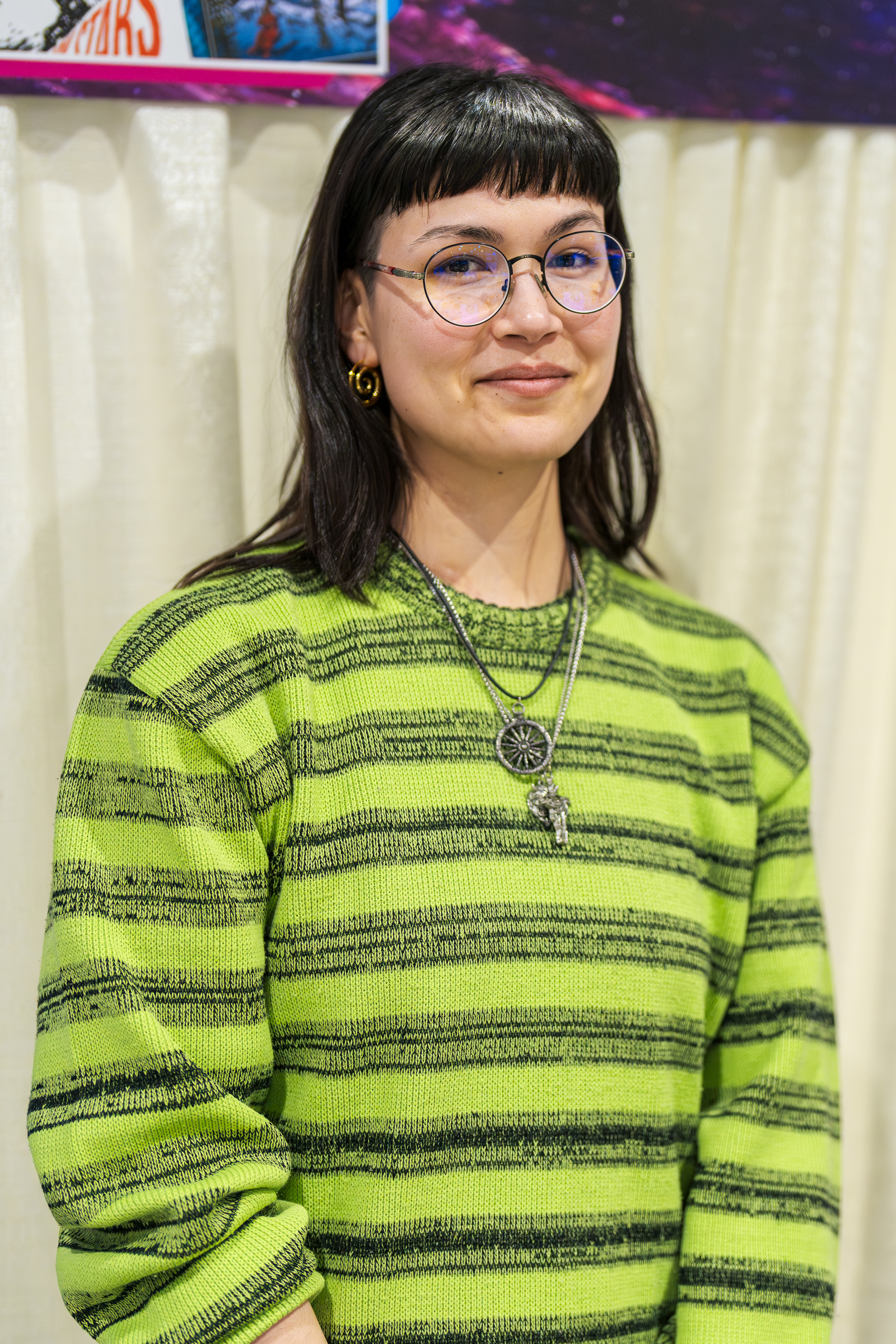
- Cha at GalaxyCon Richmond in 2026
- Born: California, U.S.
- Areas: Writer, artist
- Notable works: Black Stars Above, The Sickness

Jenna Cha is an American comic book writer and artist best known for her work on horror comics Black Stars Above and the ongoing series The Sickness.

== Early and personal life ==
Cha grew up emulating silly cartoon strips like Calvin and Hobbes and Garfield before being "accidentally, unwittingly and unwarrantedly" introduced to horror comics in middle school. She graduated from the Minneapolis College of Art and Design in 2017 with a Bachelor of Fine Arts in comic art. While there, she interned with American comic artist Paul Fricke.

== Career ==
=== Debut ===
Cha made her comic book debut with the release of Black Stars Above through Vault Comics in 2019-2020. It was longlisted for a Bram Stoker Award.

After getting Black Stars Above greenlit on a written pitch alone, Lonnie Nadler needed an artist. He frequently scrolled through social media for new comic book artists, and stumbled across Cha's social media on Twitter from a #VisibleWoman post. He reached out to Vault editor-in-chief Adrian Wassel, who responded that he was just about to email him about Cha, recommending her for the job.

=== Current work ===
Cha has worked as a cover artist with independent comic book publishers like Dark Horse Comics, Oni Press and Image Comics.

In June 2023, Cha and Nadler began releasing The Sickness with Uncivilized Books. The collection was first published in print in 2024. Cha's work on The Sickness has been called a "tour de force" of art with "impeccably researched and perfectly-realized" set pieces, with her artwork being called "grim, unsettling, and disturbing in all the right way(s)".

== Bibliography ==
=== Writer/Artist ===
- "Evening Coffee", Viscere #1: Body Horror

=== Interior art ===
- The Sickness #1-Present, Uncivilized Books
- "True Weird: Grande Peur", Blue Book #3, Dark Horse Comics
- "She's Got It", Razorblades: The Horror Magazine #1
- Black Stars Above, 2019-2020 Vault Comics

=== Covers only ===
- Dead by Daylight: The Hillbilly #2, Cover F Virgin Variant, Titan Comics
- Dead by Daylight: The Hillbilly #2, Cover B Variant, Titan Comics
- Mind MGMT: New & Improved #1, Cover C Blind Bag Variant, Oni Press
- Little Nightmares: Descent to Nowhere #2, Cover B Variant, Titan Comics
- Cemetery Kids Run Rabid #4, Cover B Variant, Oni Press
- Be Not Afraid #2, Cover D 1:20 Virgin Variant, Boom! Studios
- The Goddamn Tragedy #1, Cover D Variant, Oni Press
- You'll Do Bad Things #1, Cover C 1:10 Variant, Image Comics
- When I Lay My Vengeance Upon Thee #4, Cover D 1:15 Virgin Variant, Boom! Studios
- Séance in the Asylum #4, Cover B Variant Dark Horse Comics
- Into the Unbeing #3, Cover B Variant, Dark Horse Comics
- Operation Sunshine: Already Dead #4, Cover C Variant, Dark Horse Comics
- The Deviant #3, Cover C 1:25 Variant, Image Comics
- Dwellings #1, Cover C Variant, Oni Press
- W0rldtr33 #15, Cover C 1:15 Cha Variant Image Comics
- What's the Furthest Place From Here? #2, Cover C 1:15 Variant Image Comics
- ThoughtScape Comics #1
- The Department of Truth #19, Cover B 1:25 Variant Image Comics
