= Jjimjilbang =

Type of Korean bathhouse

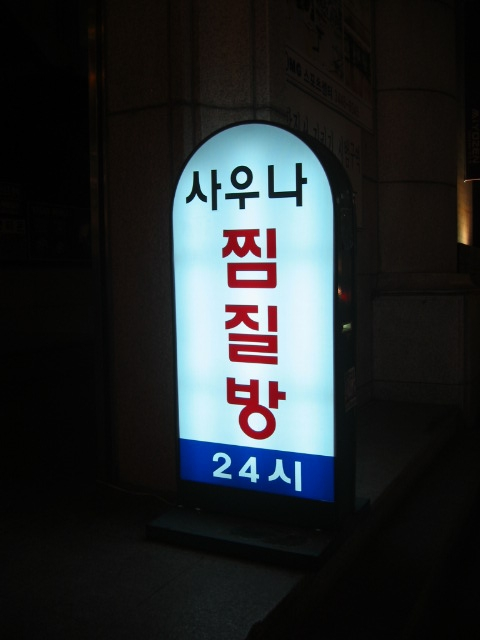
Jjimjilbang sign in Apgujeong, Seoul

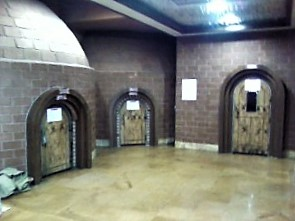
Jjimjilbang room

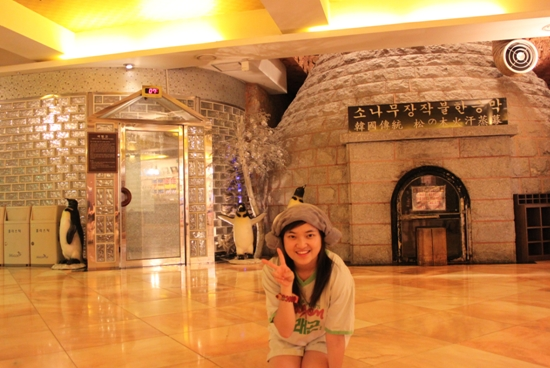
Young woman in a jjimjilbang

Jjimjilbang (Korean: 찜질방; MR: tchimjilbang; Korean pronunciation: [t͈ɕimdʑilbaŋ], lit. 'poultice room') are bathhouses in South Korea which gained popularity in the 1990s.

They are separated by gender and typically have hot tubs, showers, Korean traditional kiln saunas, and massage tables. Jjimjil is derived from the words meaning heating. In other areas of the building or on other floors there are unisex areas, usually with a snack bar, ondol-heated floor for lounging and sleeping, wide-screen TVs, exercise rooms, ice rooms, heated salt rooms, internet cafe, karaoke bars, and sleeping quarters with bunk beds or sleeping mats. Many of the sleeping rooms have themes or elements to them. Usually jjimjilbang will have various rooms with temperatures to suit guests' preferred relaxing temperatures. Walls can be decorated with woods, minerals, crystals, stones, and metals to make the ambient mood and smell more natural. The elements used have traditional Korean medicinal purposes in the rooms.

Many jjimjilbang are open at all hours and are a popular weekend getaway for South Korean families. Some jjimjilbang allow customers to sleep there overnight. South Korean men, particularly those who work away from their families or stayed out late drinking or working, sleep in jjimjilbang overnight. Theft, usually of smartphones, is occasionally a problem at some jimjilbang.

== Facilities ==
Jjimjilbang never operate 24 hours a day. In the entrance, there are the doors labelled “men” or “women” and shoes are to be stored using a given key. Once inside, the shoe locker key is exchanged with another locker key to store clothes and belongings. Afterwards bathers walk into the gender-segregated bathhouse area (children of both genders below seven years of age are free to intermingle) and take a shower. Then, one should wear the jjimjilbang clothes (usually a T-shirt and shorts, color-coordinated according to gender), which are received with the locker key.

In the bathing areas, there are kiln saunas with themes including a jade, a salt, or mineral kiln: the dome-shaped inside the kilns are plastered with jade powder, salt and mineral respectively.

Often there are several kilns with temperatures ranging from 15 to 50 °C (60 to 120 °F). The temperature of the kilns is displayed on a sign at the entrance.

== Hygiene ==
Some jjimjilbang have had their sanitary condition questioned, both in terms of facilities, clothes, and of food offered at the venue. Concerns about the clothes increasing atopy symptoms in patients, or even of accidentally hosting parasites, have been voiced, although evidence was inconclusive. Currently, health control standards are set by the Public Health Control Act.

== Korean sauna ==
Hanjeungmak (한증막; 汗蒸幕) is Korean traditional sauna. Intensely hot and dry, it uses traditionally burning wood of pine to heat a domelike kiln made of stone. Nowadays, hanjeungmak are incorporated into jjimjilbang rather than being independent facilities. Bulgama installed in jjimjilbang is a variety of hanjeungmak, heated with higher temperature. Sometimes the dome-shaped walls of kiln rooms are plastered with loam, salt, minerals.

The first mention of hanjeungmak, initially referred to as hanjeungso (한증소; 汗蒸所), is found in the Annals of Sejong in the 15th century. The record also states that the Korean kiln saunas were used for medicinal purposes. At that time, hanjeungmak were state-supported kiln saunas maintained by Buddhist monks. Since 1429, saunas have been built as separate facilities for men and women.

== See also ==
- Mogyoktang
- Sauna
  - Finnish sauna
  - Banya
- Sentō
- Spa
- Ttaemiri
