= Fire! (manga) =

Japanese manga series

- First tankōbon volume cover

ファイヤー! (Faiyā!)
- Manga
- Written by: Hideko Mizuno
- Published by: Shueisha
- English publisher: NA: Uncivilized Books
- Imprint: Sun Comics (Asahi Sonorama)
- Magazine: Seventeen
- Original run: 1969 – 1971
- Volumes: 4

Fire! (Japanese: ファイヤー!, Hepburn: Faiyā!) is a Japanese manga series written and illustrated by Hideko Mizuno. It was serialized in Shueisha's magazine Seventeen from 1969 to 1971. It is about the rise and fall of an American rock star named Aaron. It won the 1970 Shogakukan Manga Award. Uncivilized Books is set to publish the manga in English under its imprint Mangalith in October 2026.

Aaron Browning is an American teenager who gets sent to juvenile prison after being caught with a delinquent named Fire Wolf. He finds solace in music and later manages to sort-of bond with Fire Wolf himself, and he ultimately leaves to Detroit determined to make it in the musical industry. He leads a band named Fire! and seeks to lead people to freedom with their music.

The hedonistic Aaron is neither a 'boy next door' character, nor a 'shining prince', and Sandra Buckley states that it was his 'non-conventional, rebellious behavior' that was part of the attraction for the fans of Fire!. It was innovative for shōjo manga by having the first sexually explicit scenes in post-World War II manga, and by having a male protagonist. The model for Aaron was Scott Walker of The Walker Brothers.

The story has been read as a "conservative morality tale", but Buckley states that this ignores the two-year run of readers following Aaron's exploits avidly. There are accounts of teenage girls queueing for the next issue to come out.
