= Hadaka no tsukiai =

Japanese cultural idea

Hadaka no tsukiai (裸の付き合い) is an idea in Japanese culture that spending time together naked allows for more open and honest conversation. Hadaka no tsukiai relationships are platonic rather than sexual.

A family, a group of housewives from the same neighborhood, a group of businessmen, or a group of classmates might spend time together naked at a sentō bathhouse, at an onsen hot spring, or at a health club. This allows opportunities for social bonding.
