= Anne Elizabeth Moore =

American cultural critic, artist, journalist, and editor

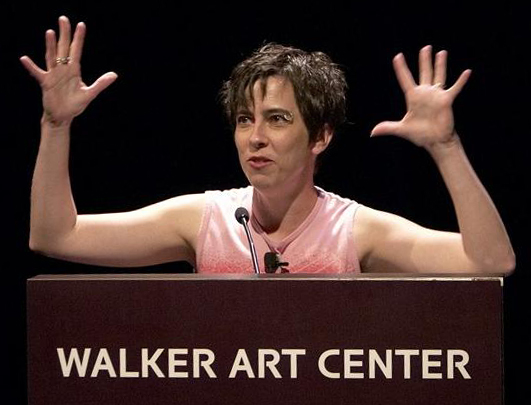
- Born: 1971 (age 54–55); Winner, South Dakota, U.S.
- Education: University of Wisconsin–Eau Claire; School of the Art Institute of Chicago
- Known for: Illustrations

Anne Elizabeth Moore (born 1971 in Winner, South Dakota) is an American cultural critic, artist, journalist, and editor. She is well known for her books Body Horror: Capitalism, Fear, Misogyny, Jokes (2017), Sweet Little Cunt: the Graphic Work of Julie Doucet (2018), about Julie Doucet, and Gentrifier: A Memoir (2021). Her work mainly deals with the nature of power and women’s oppression, the housing crisis and gentrification, and women’s health.

Moore’s writing has been featured in various publications, including the Guardian, Salon, Paris Review, Chicago Journal, and The Baffler. She has written extensively about culture and media, illness, and human rights. Her essays “Reimagining the National Border Patrol Museum (and Gift Shop)” (2008) and “17 Theses on the Edge” (2010) have respectively received honorable mentions in Best American Non-Required Reading.

== Life and career ==
Born 1971 in Winner, South Dakota, Moore attended the University of Wisconsin–Eau Claire and later the School of the Art Institute of Chicago, where she got her start and trained as an artist to eventually exhibit work internationally. Her work has also been in the Whitney Biennial in New York City and the Museum of Contemporary Art Chicago. She also received various awards, including the National Endowment for the Arts Media Award, the Ragdale Fellowship, the USC Annenberg/Getty Arts Journalism Fellowship, the UN Press Fellowship for journalism, and two Fulbright Scholarships.

Moore was named editor-in-chief of the Chicago Reader in October 2018, replacing Mark Konkol. She abruptly departed the Reader in March 2019.

Currently, she lives in Upstate New York with her cat, Captain America, writing, traveling, teaching, and dealing with the occasional cow and snake.

== Nonfiction ==
=== Books ===
- Moore, Anne Elizabeth (2007). Unmarketable: Brandalism, Copyfighting, Mocketing, and the Erosion of Integrity. The New Press. ISBN 9781595581686.
- — (2012). Hip Hop Apsara: Ghosts Past and Present. Chicago, IL: Green Lantern Press. ISBN 9781450775267.
- — (2013). New Girl Law: Drafting a Future for Cambodia. Portland, OR: Cantankerous Titles. ISBN 9781621064626.
- — (2016). Threadbare: Clothes, Sex, and Trafficking. Portland, OR: Microcosm Publishing. ISBN 9781621067399.
- — (2017). Body Horror: Capitalism, Fear, Misogyny, Jokes. Chicago, IL: Curbside Splendor. ISBN 9781940430935. (Feminist Press edition 2023, ISBN 9781558612860)
- — (2018). Sweet Little Cunt: the Graphic Work of Julie Doucet. Minneapolis, MN: Uncivilized Books. ISBN 9781941250280.
- — (2021). Gentrifier: A Memoir. New York, NY: Catapult. ISBN 9781646221592.

== Selected Essays ==
=== Essays on American Culture ===
- On Leaving the Birthplace of Standard Time, The Believer (an excerpt from Body Horror)
- Knocked Out Loaded, The New Inquiry

=== Comics, Books, Film & Art ===
- The Destabilizing Desire of Julie Doucet, Paris Review (an excerpt from Sweet Little Cunt)
- The Never-ending Story, The Baffler
- Silenced without Proof: On Soft Censorship, PEN America
- Our Pol Pot: A Film from Cambodia, n+1

=== Media and Politics ===
- The Vertically Integrated Rape Joke, The Baffler

=== Women & Labor ===
- Moore, Anne Elizabeth (May 28, 2014). "Here's why it matters when a human rights crusader builds her advocacy on lies". Salon. Archived from the original on May 28, 2014.
- Degendering Value, Jacobin

== Awards ==
- 2019 Eisner Award for Best Academic/Scholarly Work for Sweet Little Cunt: The Graphic Work of Julie Doucet (Uncivilized Books)
