= Sansuke =

Male bath house attendants

In this woodcut of a public bathhouse in Japan, the sansuke is the man in the upper left corner.

Sansuke (三助) is a term referring to the male working staff who provide specific services at the Sento (銭湯, public bathhouse) in Japan. They were usually hired for both men and women to assist in bathing and provide massage services.

== Roles of male bathhouse attendants ==
In Japanese, Sansuke originally meant three types of services: kamataki (stoking of the boiler), yukagen wo miru (checking the temperature of the bath water), and bandai (fee collection). Occasionally, the Sansuke would provide the services of scrubbing and grooming the customer. After the role took on greater prevalence, the image of the Sansuke was generalized to mean service to the visitor in the bathhouse.

Another theory suggests that when smallpox was rampant in Japan around the Nara era, the Empress Kohmyo built a bathhouse dedicated to the treatment of patients. It still exists today in the temple at Hokke-ji. Legend says that she even sucked the pus from the boils herself. The attendants who helped the Empress during that time were called Sansuke (三典).

During the Edo era, a Genan (下男, manservant), or Komono (小者, humble servant) was widely described as Sansuke as well.

At work, the Sansuke wore Sarumata (Japanese underwear); in earlier days, the Sansuke wore Fundoshi (breech cloth).

== Sansuke in premodern times ==
Until the early Edo era, the services rendered by the Sansuke were provided by Yuna girls, who were attendants in the bathhouses called yunafuro. The Okami (the government) banned these bathhouses due to their growing reputation for sexual acts and other forms of lax behavior. The hairstyles during this period were such that it was difficult to do one's hair without the help of an attendant. Hence, male bathhouse attendants began to offer the services previously provided by the yuna for a small fee.

Sansuke was the highest class of male servants who served a master at the sento. In the process to become a Sansuke, there were several precursor roles: collector of firewood, boiler man, and Yuban, checker of the bath temperature, and so on. It was impossible to become a Sansuke without learning these important skills.

Later, based on historical accounts, the Sansuke also started providing sexual services. This development is attributed to the nature of the public bathhouses as a convenient site for discreet sexual encounters.

== Nagashi ==
The service of washing off the dirt and brushing done by a Sansuke is called Nagashi. When announced by Bandai that there are customers, a Sansuke pours hot water into Oke and calls the customers in. If there are many customers waiting, the Sansuke must wash his customers quickly. The Sansuke offered service for both men and women; he may be required to work in crowds of naked women, whereby he must use his mental training to prevent himself from having an erection. It is said that women were not ashamed to be seen by his eyes.

When the washing service is complete he receives a tag from the customer; his percentage of pay was based according to the number on the tag. The Sansuke belonged to a higher economic bracket in Sento and were considered to be gentlemen.

== Sansuke during early-modern times ==
Aka-suri, or massage, was called a Nagashi, and it reached the height of popularity in the middle of the Showa era; it was considered to be a luxury at this time. Due to the subsequent proliferation of boilers and baths in general households, the need for Sansuke eventually waned and the service of Nagashi along with it. However, there are accounts that show the existence of Sansuke even during and after the American occupation of Japan. For instance, the Sansuke was referenced in the description of the communal Japanese bathhouse separated into two sections for male and female bathers. This attendant was identified as the only individual exempted from the gender segregation in the facility, providing services such as washing one's back and massage to both men and women.

== Reference books ==
- NHK教育『知るを楽しむ 歴史に好奇心』 あ～極楽の銭湯史- 第3回
- 小野武雄1977『江戸の遊戯風俗図誌』
- 赤松啓介1994『夜這いの民俗学』
- 赤松啓介VS上野千鶴子『猥談 : 近代日本の下半身』
- 吉田忠, 深瀬泰旦編『東と西の医療文化』 - 思文閣出版, 2001.
- 中野栄三『入浴・銭湯の歴史』雄山閣出版、1984年、（雄山閣BOOKS No.16） ISBN 4-639-00311-0
- 笹川潔 1912 『前小景』 敬文館書房
