= Hideko Mizuno =

Japanese manga artist

Hideko Mizuno 水野英子
- Born: October 29, 1939 (age 87) Shimonoseki, Yamaguchi, Japan
- Area: Manga artist
- Notable works: Fire! Honey Honey no Suteki na Bouken
- Awards: 15th Shogakukan Manga Award - Fire!

Hideko Mizuno (水野英子, Mizuno Hideko; born 29 October 1939 in Shimonoseki, Yamaguchi, Japan) is one of the first successful female Japanese shōjo manga artists. She was an assistant of Osamu Tezuka staying in Tokiwa-sō. She made her professional debut in 1955 with Akakke Kōma Pony, a Western story with a tomboy heroine. She became a prominent shōjo artist in the 1960s and 1970s, starting with White Troika, which serialized in Margaret in 1963.

Mizuno is best known for Fire! (1969–1971), one of the first shōjo manga with a boy protagonist, for which she won the 1970 Shogakukan Manga Award. Her Honey Honey no Suteki na Bouken (1966) was adapted as an anime television series, licensed in English as Honey Honey on CBN Cable Network.

== Early life ==
Hideko Mizuno grew up in Shimonoseki. Her father was stationed in Manchukuo during World War II and never returned home afterward. Her mother died young, and thereafter she was cared for by her grandmother and an uncle.

She discovered manga very early: at the age of 8 she read the manga Shin Takarajima by Osamu Tezuka, as well as his book Manga Daigaku, which teaches the basics of manga creation. Thanks to these two books, she took Tezuka as a model and decided to become a mangaka. In 1952, at the age of 12, she regularly contributed to competitions organized by the monthly magazine Manga Shōnen chaired by Tezuka. Although her manga was never accepted, her efforts did not go unnoticed: she received an honorable mention, and publisher Akira Maruyama from Kōdansha took notice. In March 1955, when she was about to leave junior high for work, not wishing to go to high school, she received a letter from Maruyama, an order for a board and two illustrations for the magazine Shōjo Club. At the time, Mizuno was 15 years old.

== Career ==
For a year and a half, Mizuno worked at a fishing net factory to make a living and drew for Shōjo Club at the same time. Her first manga, Akkake Kōma Pony, was published in 1955. Mizuno told Maruyama that it would be about "little girl and a pony", and while he was expecting a sentimental manga with a sensitive and fragile heroine, which was the norm in the magazine's productions, Mizuno provided a Western-inspired manga with a tomboy heroine. However, it was nevertheless published; Mizuno described Maruyama as "broad-minded".

In 1956, Mizuno went to Tokyo for the first time, where she met Tezuka. The following year, she published her first series, Gin no Hanabira, which was a success. In 1958, invited by Tezuka, she moved to the Tokiwa-sō apartment building in Tokyo, where she lived and worked with the two authors Shōtarō Ishinomori and Fujio Akatsuka. Together, they collaborated on two manga under the pseudonym U. Mia for the magazine Shōjo Club. She only stayed in Tokiwa-sō for seven months.

As she continued her career as a mangaka, Mizuno's work met with success and helped broaden the register of shōjo manga: until the mid-1960s, shōjo manga regularly followed the structure of haha-mono, centered on the mother-daughter relationship. During the 1960s, several women mangaka, including Mizuno, introduced a new type of story: the romantic comedy. Mizuno notably adapted two films in manga form, with Sabrina adapted in the manga Sutekina Cora (1963) and The Quiet Man adapted as Akage no Scarlet (1966).

Mizuno created Harp of the Stars in 1960, a love story drawing from Norse mythology and in particular, Die Walküre. It was the first shōjo manga to depict a romantic relationship. From 1964 to 1965, she published Shiroi Toroika (White Troika), a historical drama set during the Russian Revolution.

Mizuno is best known for Fire! (1969–1971), one of the first shōjo manga with a boy protagonist, for which she won the 1970 Shogakukan Manga Award. Mizuno was a fan of progressive rock such as Pink Floyd, and she visited Europe and the United States for research. The work contains characters from different races to reflect the makeup of American society, and it also depicts sex scenes. Mizuno said she "drew the art to express the hippie message, which was to throw away all pretense and be your true self." After the serialisation of Fire!, Mizuno became a single mother.

Her Honey Honey no Suteki na Bouken (1966) was adapted as an anime television series, licensed in English as Honey Honey on CBN Cable Network.

Some of Mizuno's works star adult women as protagonists, distinguished from children by the work's inclusion of heterosexual love. Mizuno was inspired by Hollywood romantic films like those featuring Audrey Hepburn.

== Works ==
- Gin no Hanabira, 1958
- Hoshi no Tategoto, 1960
- Shiroi Troika, 1964
- Honey Honey no Suteki na Bouken, 1966
- Konnichiwa Sensei = Harō Doku, 1968
- Faiyā: Fire, 1969
- Yoru no Hana, 1976
- Budda to Onna no Monogatari, 1986
- Erizabēto, 1996

== Bibliography ==
- Brient, Hervé, ed. (2008). Homosexualité et manga: le yaoi. Manga: 10000 images (in French). Editions H. ISBN 978-2-9531781-0-4.

- Brient, Hervé (2008b). "Une petite histoire du yaoi". Homosexualité et manga: Le yaoi (in French): 5–11.

- Fujimoto, Yukari (1991). "A Life-Size Mirror: Women's Self-Representation in Girls' Comics". Review of Japanese Culture and Society. 4.
- Kálovics, Dalma (2016). "The missing link of shōjo manga history: the changes in 60s shōjo manga as seen through the magazine Shūkan Margaret" (PDF). Kyōto Seika Daigaku Kiyō (49). Kyoto Seika University. Archived (PDF) from the original on 4 November 2019.
- Pinon, Matthieu; Lefebvre, Laurent (2016). "Hideko Mizuno". In Ynnis (ed.). Histoire(s) du manga moderne: 1952–2014 [History(Histories) of modern manga: 1952–2014] (in French). Ynnis éditions. p. 37. ISBN 979-10-93376-40-0.
- Toku, Masami, ed. (2015). "Profile and Interview with Hideko Mizuno". International Perspectives on Shojo and Shojo Manga: The Influence of Girl Culture. Routledge. pp. 160–167. ISBN 978-1-31761-075-5. Toku 2015.
