= Ttaemiri =

Korean bathhouse staff

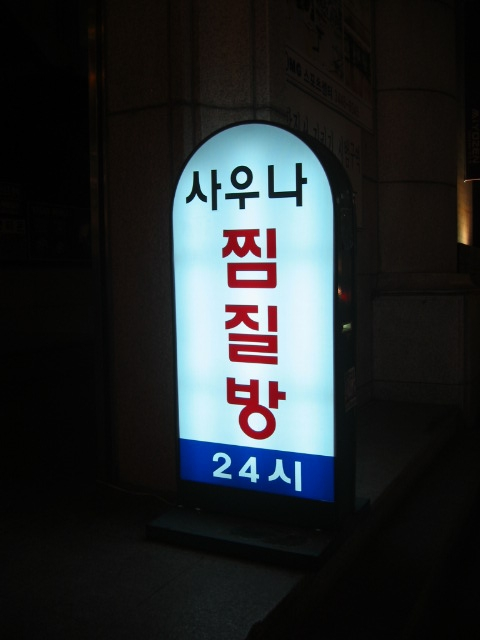
Jjimjilbang sign

Ttaemiri (Korean: 때밀이) are the working staff who provide many services at jjimjilbang (bathhouses) in South Korea.
