= Sentō =

Type of Japanese communal bathhouse

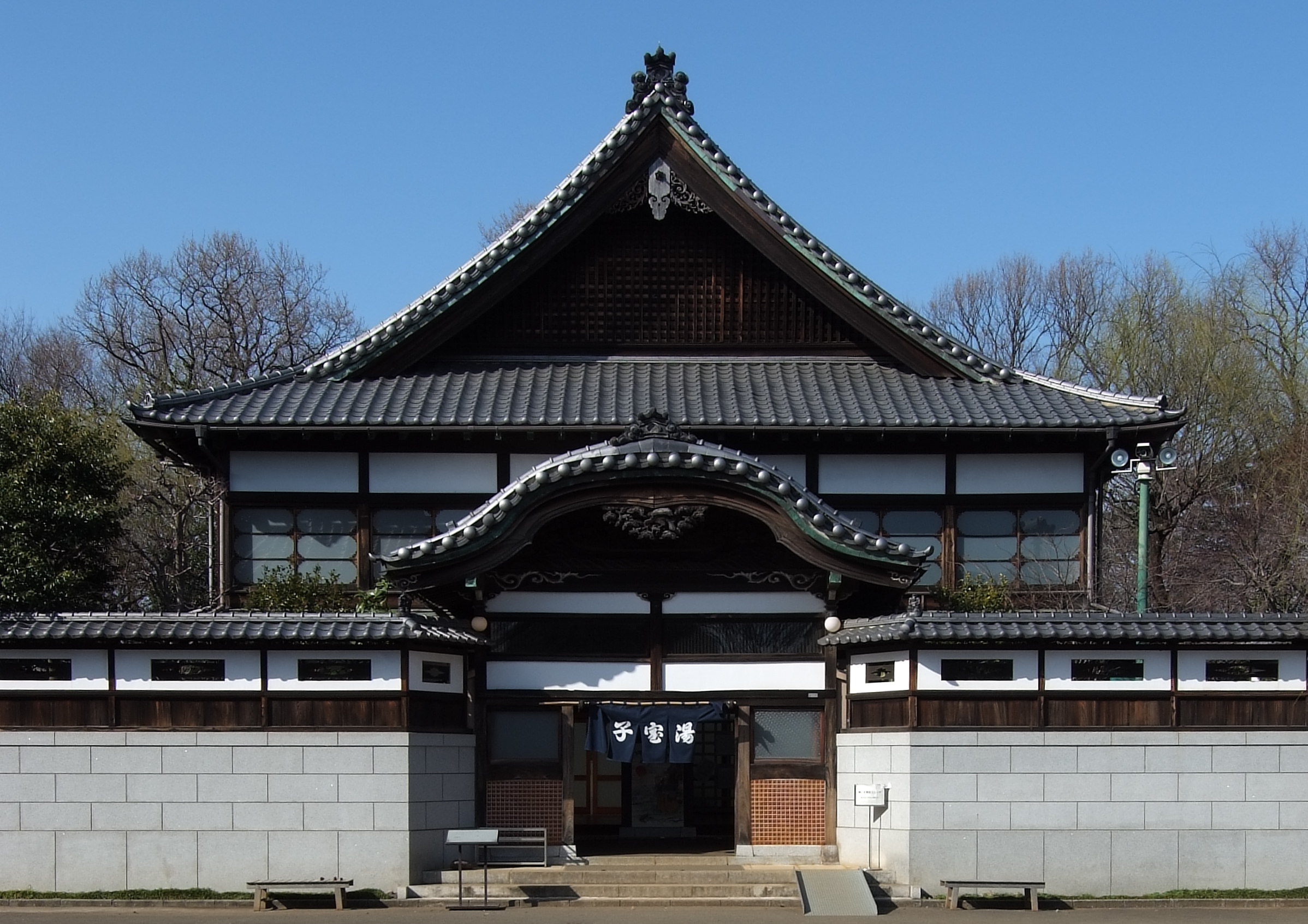
Entrance to the sentō at the Edo-Tokyo Open Air Architectural Museum

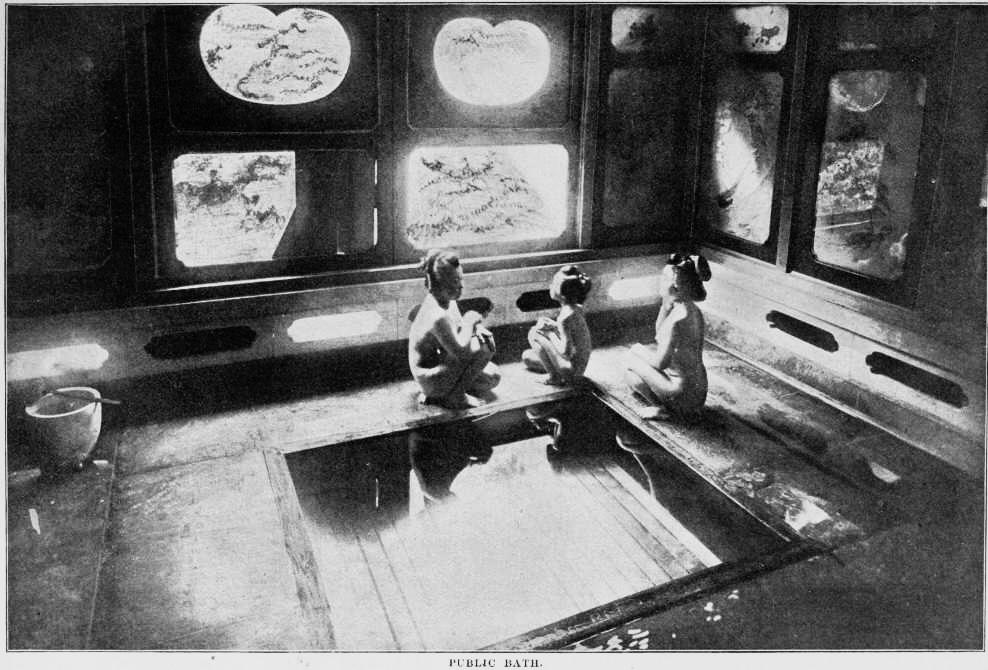
1901 image of sentō

Sentō (銭湯) is a type of Japanese communal bathhouse where customers pay for entrance. Traditionally these bathhouses have been quite utilitarian, with a tall barrier separating the sexes within one large room, a minimum of lined-up faucets on both sides, and a single large bath for the already washed bathers to sit in among others. Since the second half of the 20th century, these communal bathhouses have been decreasing in numbers as more and more Japanese residences now have baths. Some Japanese find social importance in going to public baths, out of the theory that physical proximity/intimacy brings emotional intimacy, which is termed skinship in pseudo-English Japanese. Others go to a sentō because they live in a small housing facility without a private bath or to enjoy bathing in a spacious room and to relax in saunas or jet baths that often accompany new or renovated sentōs.

Another type of Japanese public bath is onsen, which uses hot water from a natural hot spring. In general, the word onsen means that the bathing facility has at least one bath filled with natural hot spring water. However, throughout the Kansai region of Japan, the word "onsen" is also a commonly used naming scheme for sentō. Sentō and supersentō in Kansai that do have access to a hot spring will often differentiate themselves by having "natural hot spring" (天然温泉) somewhere on their signage.

== Layout and architectural features ==
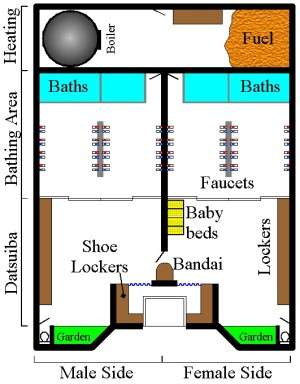
General floor layout of a sentō with a bandai configuration

=== Entrance area ===
There are multiple different layouts for a Japanese sentō or public bath. Most traditional sentō, however, are similar to the layout shown adjacent. The entrance from the outside looks somewhat similar to a temple, with a Japanese curtain (暖簾, noren) across the entrance. The curtain is usually blue and shows the kanji 湯 (yu, lit. hot water) or the corresponding hiragana ゆ. After the entrance, there is an area with shoe lockers, followed by two long curtains or doors, one on each side. These lead to the datsuijo (脱衣場, changing room), also known as datsuiba, for the men and women respectively. The men's and the women's sides are similar and differ only slightly.

=== Changing room ===
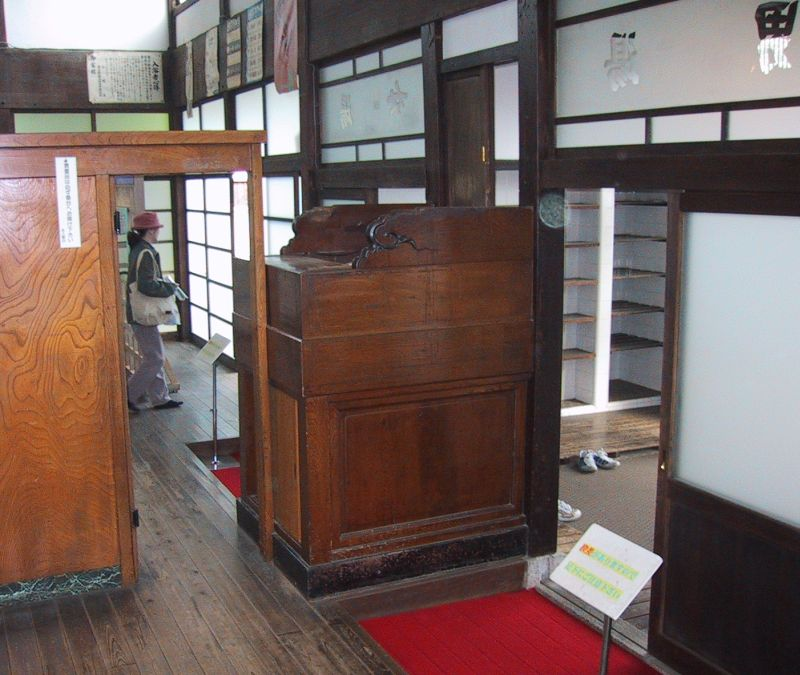
Bandai in the Edo-Tokyo Open Air Architectural Museum

A public bathing facility in Japan typically has one of two kinds of entrances. One is the front desk variety, where a person in charge sits at a front desk, abbreviated as "front". The other entrance variety is the bandai style. In Tokyo, 660 sentō facilities have a "front"-type entrance, while only 315 still have the more traditional bandai-style entrance.

Inside, between the entrances is the bandai (番台), where the attendant sits. The bandai is a rectangular or horseshoe-shaped platform with a railing, usually around 1.5 to 1.8 m high. Above the bandai is usually a large clock. Immediately in front of the bandai is usually a utility door, to be used by the attendants only. The dressing room is approximately 10 m by 10 m, sometimes partly covered with tatami sheets and contains lockers for clothes. Often, there is a large shelf storing equipment for regular customers.

The ceiling is high, at 3 to 4 m. The separating wall between the men's and the women's side is about 1.5 m high. The dressing room also often has access to a small Japanese garden with a pond and a Japanese-style toilet. There are a number of tables and chairs, including some coin-operated massage chairs. Usually, there is also a scale to measure weight, and sometimes height. In some old sentō, this scale may use the traditional Japanese measure monme (匁, 1 monme = 3.75 g) and kan (1 kan = 1000 monme = 3.75 kg). Similarly, in old sentō the height scale may go only to 180 cm. Local business often advertises in the sentō. The women's side usually has some baby beds and may have more mirrors. The decoration and the advertising are often gender-specific on the different sides. There is usually a refreshment cooler there where the customers can self-serve and pay the attendant. Milk drinks are traditional favorites and sometimes there is ice cream.

=== Bathing area ===
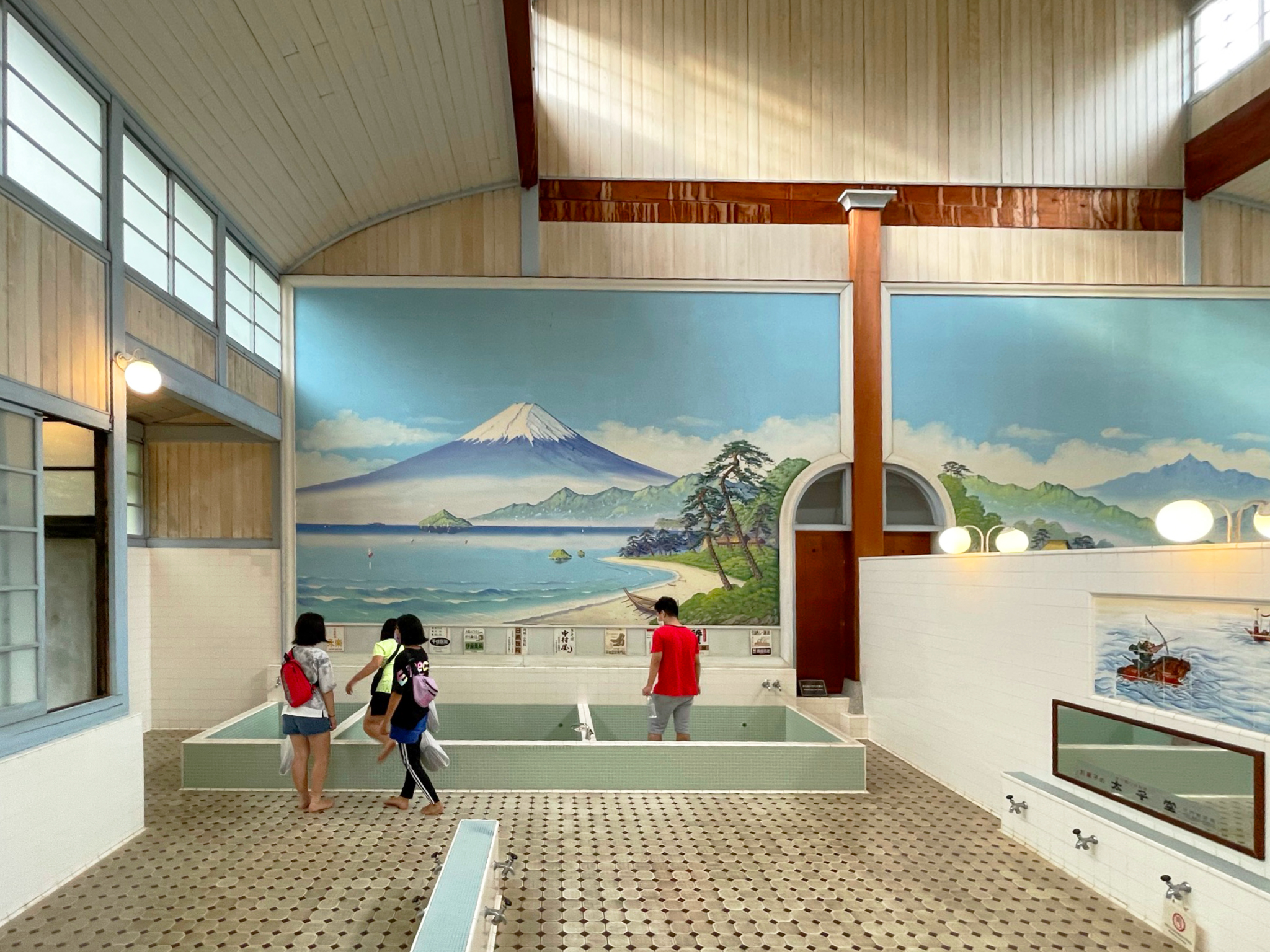
Men's section

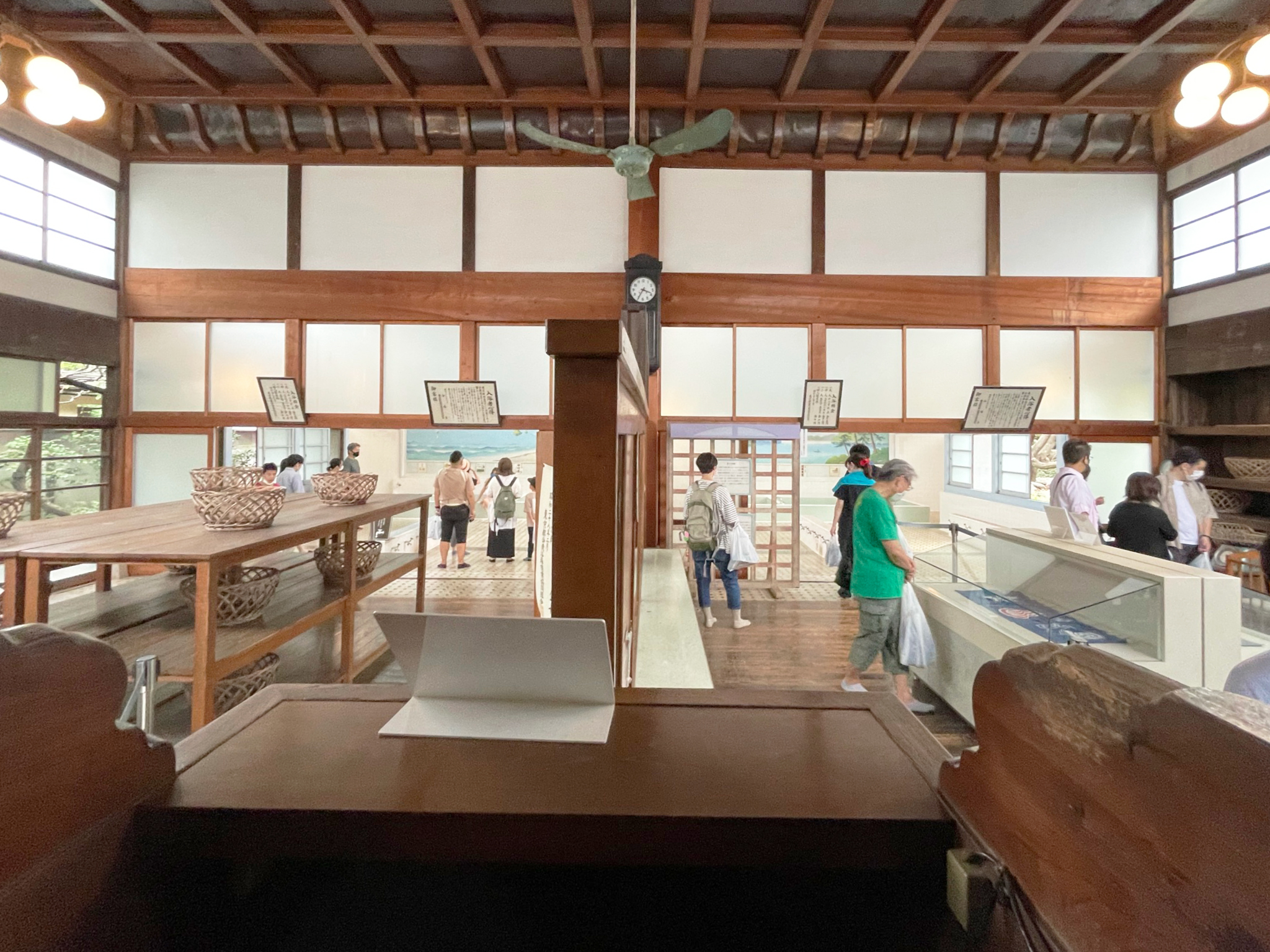
View from bandai

The bathing area is separated from the changing area by a sliding door to keep the heat in the bath. An exception are baths in Okinawa, where the climate is warmer and there is no need to keep the hot air in the bath. Sentō in Okinawa usually have no separation between the changing room and the bathing area or only a small wall with an opening to pass through.

The bathing area is usually tiled. Near the entrance area is a supply of small stools and buckets. There are a number of washing stations at the wall and sometimes in the middle of the room, each with usually two faucets (karan, カラン, after the Dutch word kraan for faucet), one for hot water and one for cold water, and a showerhead.

At the end of the room are the bathtubs, usually at least two or three with different water temperatures, and maybe a 'denki buro' (電気風呂, electric bath). In the Osaka and Kansai area the bathtubs are more often found in the center of the room, whereas in Tokyo they are usually at the end of the room. The separating wall between the men and the women side is also about 1.5 m high. The ceiling may be 4 m high, with large windows in the top. On rare occasions, the separating wall also has a small hole. This was used to pass soap. At the wall on the far end of the room is usually a large ceramic tile mural or painting for decoration. Most often this is Mount Fuji, but it may be a general Japanese landscape, a (faux) European landscape, a river or ocean scene. On rarer occasions, it may also show a group of warriors or a female nude on the male side. Playing children or a female beauty often decorates the women's side.

=== Boiler room ===
Behind the bathing area is the boiler room (釜場, kamaba), where the water is heated. The boiler may be powered by heating oil, electricity, or be fuelled by wood chippings or any other suitable fuel source. The tall chimneys of the boilers are often used to locate the sentō from far away. After World War II, Tokyo often had power outages when all bathhouse owners turned on the electric water heating at the same time.

=== Sauna ===
Many modern sentō have a sauna with a bathtub of cold water (around 17 degrees Celsius) just outside it for cooling off afterward. Visitors are sometimes expected to pay an extra fee to use the sauna and are often given a wristband to signify this payment.

== Etiquette ==
The Japanese public bath is one area where the uninitiated can upset regular customers by not following correct bathing etiquette designed to respect others; in particular, not washing before bathing, dipping your towel into the water, introducing soap into the bathwater, and horseplay. Sentō commonly displays a poster, a leaflet, and/or a brochure describing bathing etiquette and procedures in Japanese or occasionally in other languages for international customers.

Some ports in Hokkaidō, frequently used by foreign fishing fleets, had problems with drunken sailors misbehaving in the bath. Subsequently, a few bathhouses chose not to allow foreign customers at all.

It is common to hear people say, "gokuraku, gokuraku" when they get into the bath. It means something to the level of divine pleasure; it is a good feeling for the body and the soul.

=== Equipment ===
Taking a bath at a public sentō requires at a bare minimum a small towel and some soap/shampoo. Attendants usually sell these items for 100–200 yen. A number of people bring two towels; a hand towel for drying and a hand towel or washcloth for washing. A nylon scrubbing cloth or scrub brush with liquid soap is normally used for washing. Other body hygiene products may include a pumice stone, toothbrush, toothpaste, shaving equipment, combs, shower caps, pomade, makeup products, powder, creams, etc. Some regular customers store their bucket of bathing equipment on open shelves in the dressing room.

=== Entrance and undressing ===
In Japan, it is customary to remove one's shoes when entering a private home. Similarly, shoes are removed before entering the bathing area in a sentō. They are kept in a shoe locker. The locker is usually available free of charge. In a gender-segregated sentō, bathers go through one of the two doors. The men's door usually has a blue color and the kanji for man (男, otoko) and the women's door usually has a pink color and the kanji for woman (女, onna). The attendant usually provides at extra cost a variety of bath products including towels, soap, shampoo, razors, and combs; ice cream, milk, or juice from the freezer can also be paid for here. There are usually free lockers with keys (that may be worn on the wrist into the baths) or large baskets provided to store personal effects.

=== Bathing area ===
At onsen or hot springs, the water contains minerals and a number of people do not rinse off the water from the skin, to increase exposure to the minerals. In a regular sentō, people usually rinse off at the faucets.

=== Tattoos ===
Some public baths have signs refusing entry for people with tattoos. However, one may be allowed in if the tattoos are not too obvious. If one ventures to a public bathing place that is publicly owned, this should not present a problem as they have a duty to let all tax-paying citizens in. The original reason behind the ban was to keep out the yakuza (officially called the "violence groups" by the police).

== Sanitation ==
Japanese public baths have experienced infrequent outbreaks of dangerous Legionella bacteria. In order to prevent such problems, the sentō union adds chlorine to its baths. At the cost of higher levels of chlorine, bacteria outbreaks are practically non-existent at sentō facilities of today.

== Pricing ==
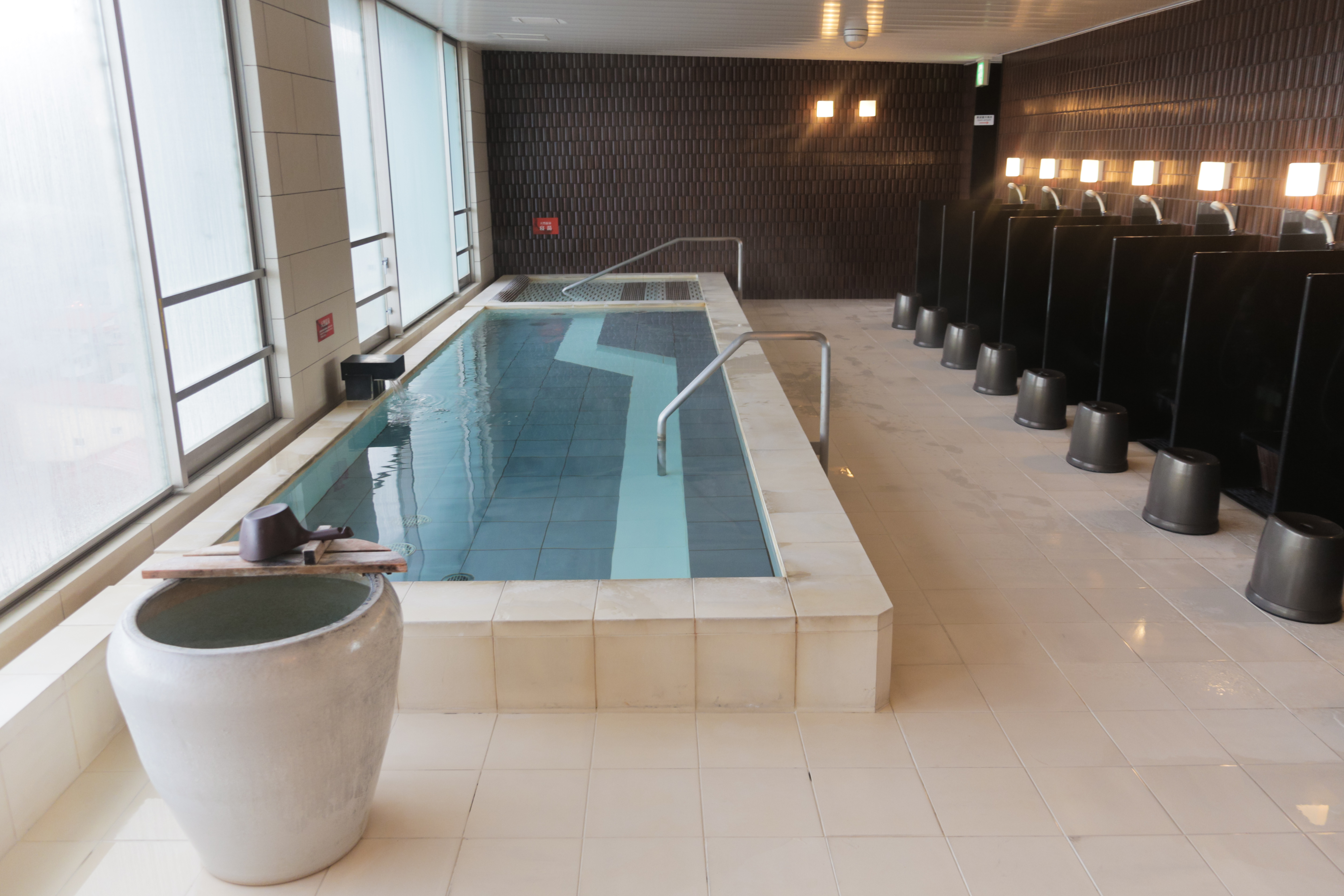
Interior of a modern sentō

Rules and pricing are regulated per prefecture based on local committees. As of March 2026, basic admission in Tokyo is ¥550 for ages 12 and up, ¥200 for ages 6-11, and ¥100 for people under 6. Citing a rise in oil prices, the price rose from ¥400 (2000–2006), to ¥430 (2006–2008) and again to ¥450 in 2008. The price for child admission was unchanged until 2022 when the price for 6- to 11-year-olds rose to ¥200 and that for younger children to ¥100.

Girls 13 years or younger and boys 8 or younger are usually permitted to enter the baths of either gender. In other prefectures, the cut-off age can be as high as 16 in Hokkaidō or as low as 5 in Hyōgo.

Most sentō in Tokyo also offer a premium service for which each facility sets its own price, usually around ¥1,000. This option is usually called a sauna since at least a sauna is included. At Civic Land Nissei, for example, the sauna option includes access to more than half the facilities available.

Larger-scale public bathing facilities are called super sentō and kenkō land, both more expensive than sentō, though super sentō offer a more modest price compared to kenkō.

At ¥300 per adult, the cheapest prefectures for sentō baths are Yamagata, Tokushima, Nagasaki, Ōita, and Miyazaki.

== History ==
The origins of the Japanese sentō and the Japanese bathing culture, in general, can be traced to the Shinto ritual purification of kegare. This condition can be remedied through purification rites called misogi and harae.

=== Nara period to Kamakura period ===
Baths in Japan were usually found in Buddhist temples. These baths were called yuya (湯屋, lit. hot water shop), or later when they increased in size ōyuya (大湯屋, lit. big hot water shop). These baths were most often steam baths (蒸し風呂, mushiburo, lit. steam bath). While initially these baths were only used by priests, sick people gradually also gained access, until in the Kamakura period (1185–1333) sick people were routinely allowed access to the bathhouse. Wealthy merchants and members of the upper class soon also included baths in their residences.

=== Kamakura period ===
The first mentioning of a commercial bathhouse is in 1266 in the Nichiren Goshoroku (日蓮御書録). These mixed-sex bath houses were only vaguely similar to modern bathhouses. After entering the bath, there was a changing room called datsuijo (脱衣場). There the customer also received his/her ration of hot water, since there were no faucets in the actual bath. The entrance to the steam bath was only a small opening with a height of about 80 cm, so that the heat did not escape. Due to the small opening, the lack of windows, and the thick steam, these baths were usually dark, and customers often cleared their throats to signal their position to others.

=== Edo period ===
Onna yu ("Bathhouse Women") by Torii Kiyonaga (1752–1815)

At the beginning of the Edo period (1603–1867), there were two types of baths common to the eastern and western regions of Japan respectively. In Edo (present-day Tokyo), bathhouses contained sizable pools and were called yuya (湯屋, lit. hot water shop). In Osaka, however, bathing establishments were primarily steam baths called mushiburo (蒸し風呂, lit. steam bath) that had only shallow pools.

At the end of the Edo period, the Tokugawa shogunate (1603–1868) at different times required baths to segregate by sex in order to ensure public moral standards. However, multiple bathhouse owners merely partitioned their baths with a small board, allowing some voyeurism to persist. Other baths avoided this problem by having men and women bathe at different times of day, or by catering to one gender exclusively. In spite of this, laws regarding mixed-sex bathing were soon relaxed again.

Contributing to the popularity of public baths in the Edo period were female bathing attendants known as yuna (湯女, lit. hot water women). These attendants helped cleanse customers by scrubbing their backs. After official closing hours, however, a number of these women would perform additional services by selling sex to male customers. Similarly, some brothels in contemporary Japan have women who specialize in bathing with and cleansing male clientele. Such establishments are often called sōpu rando (ソープランド, soapland).

As a preventive measure against prostitution, the Tokugawa shogunate stipulated that no more than three yuna serve at any given bathhouse. However, this rule was widely ignored, causing the shogunate to ban female attendants from bathhouses altogether and once again prohibit the practice of mixed-sex bathing. Large numbers of unemployed yuna thereafter moved to official red-light districts, where they could continue their services. Up until 1870, there were also male washing assistants called sansuke (三助, lit. three bits of help) who would wash and massage customers of both genders. Unlike the yuna, these male attendants were not known to engage in prostitution.

Mixed-sex bathing was prohibited once again after Commodore Perry visited Japan in 1853 and 1854—drawing question to the morality of the practice.

=== Meiji period ===
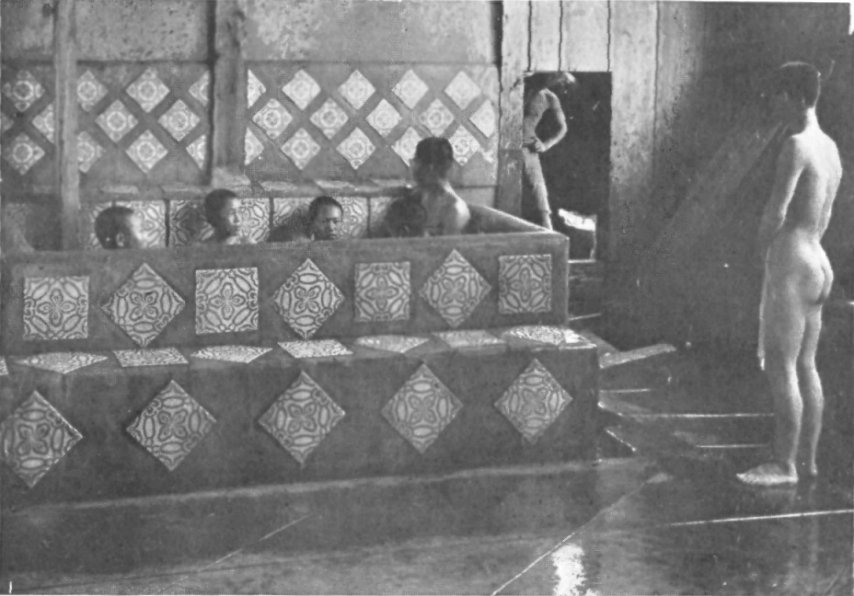
Bathing in an Agricultural School in Japan around 1920

During the Meiji period (1867–1912), the design of Japanese baths changed considerably. The narrow entrance to the bathing area was widened considerably to a regular-sized sliding door, the bathtubs were sunk partially in the floor so that they could be entered more easily, and the height of the ceiling of the bathhouse was then doubled. Since the bath now focused on hot water instead of steam, windows could be added, and the bathing area became much brighter. The only difference between these baths and the modern bath was the use of wood for the bathing area and the lack of faucets.

Furthermore, another law for segregated bathing was passed in 1890, allowing only children below the age of 8 to join a parent of the opposite sex.

=== Rebuilding ===
At the beginning of the Taishō period (1912–1926), tiles gradually replaced wooden floors and walls in new bathhouses. On September 1, 1923, the great Kantō earthquake devastated Tokyo. The earthquake and the subsequent fire destroyed most baths in the Tokyo area. This accelerated the change from wooden baths to tiled baths, as almost all new bathhouses were now built in the new style using tiled bathing areas. At the end of the Taishō period, faucets also became more common, and this type of faucet can still be seen today. These faucets were called karan (カラン, after the Dutch word kraan for faucet). There were two faucets, one for hot water and one for cold water, and the customer mixed the water in their bucket according to their personal taste.

=== Golden era ===
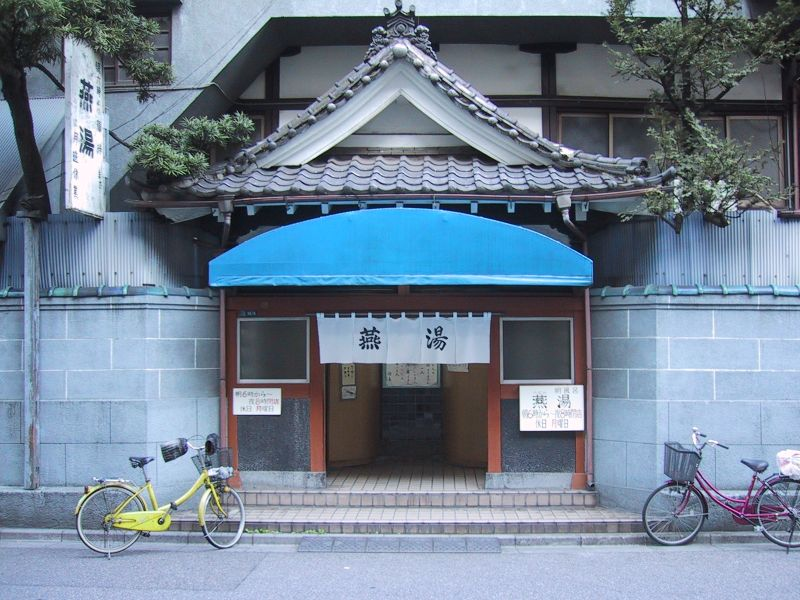
Entrance of a typical sentō in Tokyo

During World War II (for Japan, 1941–1945), a number of Japanese cities were damaged. Subsequently, most bathhouses were destroyed along with the cities. The lack of baths caused the reappearance of communal bathing and temporary baths were constructed with the available material, often lacking a roof. Furthermore, as most houses were damaged or destroyed, few people had access to a private bath, resulting in a great increase in customers for the bathhouses. New buildings in the post-war period also often lacked baths or showers, leading to an increase in the number of public baths. In 1965, a number of baths also added showerheads to the faucets in baths. The number of public baths in Japan peaked around 1970.

=== Decline ===
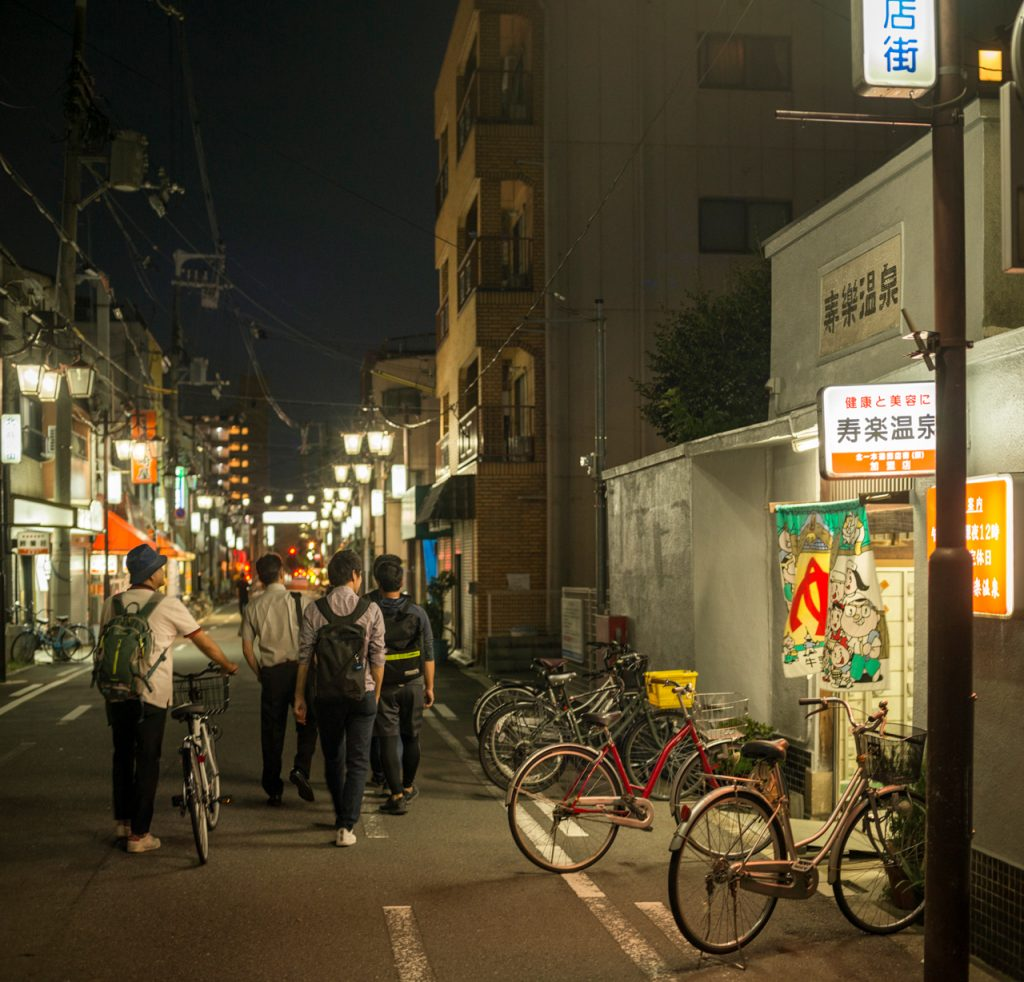
A group of young men walk past a typical community bath in the Kitakagaya neighborhood of Osaka, Japan.

Immediately after World War II, resources were scarce and few homeowners had access to a private bath. Private baths began to be more common around 1970, and most new buildings included a bath and shower unit for every apartment. Easy access to private baths led to a decline in customers for public bathhouses, and subsequently, the number of bathhouses is decreasing. Some Japanese young people today are embarrassed to be seen naked and avoid public baths for this reason. Some Japanese are concerned that without the "skinship" of mutual nakedness, children will not be properly socialized.

=== Future ===
While the traditional sentō is in decline, multiple bathhouse operators have adjusted to the new taste of the public and are offering a wide variety of experiences. Some bathhouses emphasize their tradition and run traditionally-designed bathhouses to appeal to clientele seeking lost Japan. These bathhouses are also often located in scenic areas and may include an open-air bath. Some also try drilling in order to gain access to a hot spring, turning a regular bathhouse into a more prestigious onsen.

Other bathhouses with less pristine buildings or settings change into so-called super sentō and try to offer a wider variety of services beyond the standard two or three bathtubs. They may include a variety of saunas, reintroduce steam baths, include jacuzzis and may even have a water slide. They may also offer services beyond mere cleansing, and turn into a spa, offering medical baths, massages, mud baths, fitness centers, etc., as for example the Spa LaQua at the Tokyo Dome City entertainment complex. There are also entire bathhouse-themed parks, including restaurants, karaoke and other entertainment, for example the Ōedo Onsen Monogatari (大江戸温泉物語, Big Edo Hot Spring Story) in Odaiba, Tokyo. (Note: The Ōedo Onsen Monogatari is not a sentō.) Some of these modern facilities may require swimsuits and are similar in size and function to an indoor water park.

== See also ==
- Edo-Tokyo Open Air Architectural Museum
- Furo
- Hot springs in Japan
- Jjimjilbang/Mogyoktang
- Mikveh
- Onsen
- Taiwanese hot springs
