= Jigokudani Monkey Park =

Hot springs area with large population of wild snow monkeys

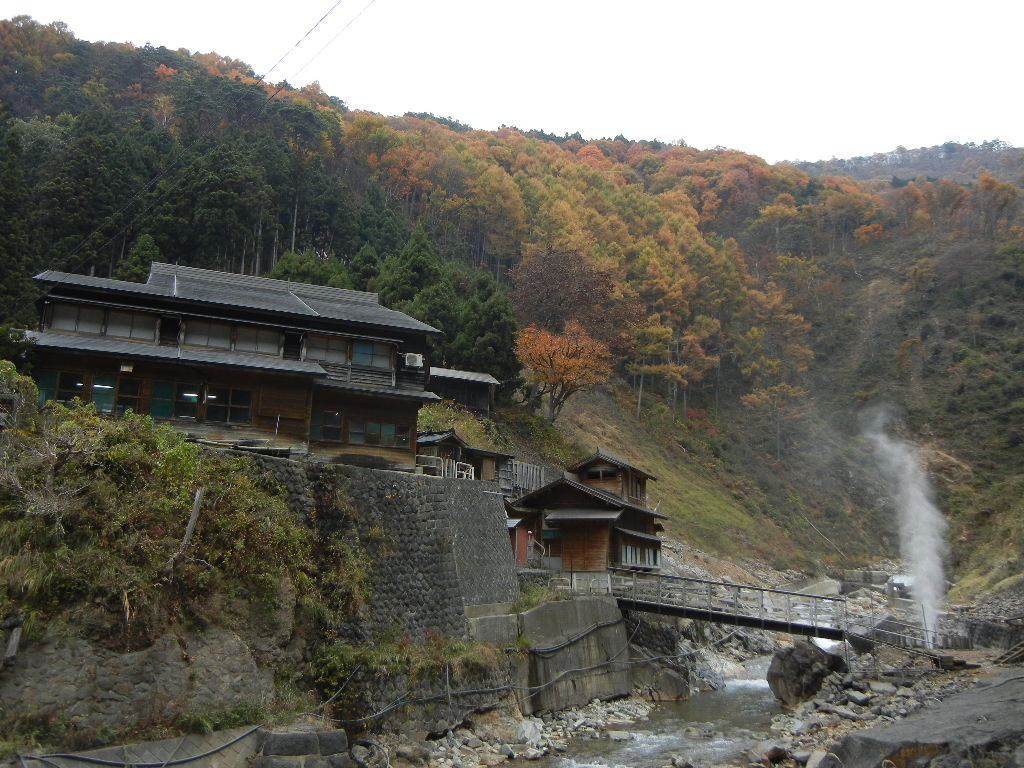
- The valley base of Jigokudani
- Interactive map of Jigokudani Monkey Park
- Location: Yamanouchi, Shimotakai District, Nagano Prefecture, Japan
- Coordinates: 36°43′59″N 138°27′48″E

Jigokudani Monkey Park (地獄谷野猿公苑, Jigokudani Yaen Kōen) is located in Yamanouchi, Nagano Prefecture, Japan, about 3.5 hours from Tokyo. It is part of the Joshinetsu Kogen National Park (locally known as Shigakogen), and is located in the valley of the Yokoyu-River, in the northern part of the prefecture. The name Jigokudani, meaning "Hell's Valley", is due to the steam and boiling water that bubbles out of small crevices in the frozen ground, surrounded by steep cliffs and formidably cold and hostile forests.

Originally, Japanese macaques lived in nearby mountains such as Shiga Kogen, but due to the development of ski resorts and forest clearing in the 1950s, they were driven out of their mountain habitat and came down to human settlements, becoming pests.

The heavy snowfalls (snow covers the ground for four months a year), an elevation of 850 m (2,800 ft), and being only accessible via a narrow 2 km (1.2 mi) footpath through the forest, keeps it uncrowded despite the park being relatively well known.

It is famous for its large population of wild Japanese macaques (Macaca fuscata), commonly referred to by foreigners as snow monkeys, that go to the valley during the winter, foraging elsewhere in the national park during the warmer months. The monkeys descend from the steep cliffs and forest to sit in the warm waters of the onsen (hotsprings), and return to the security of the forests in the evenings.

However, since the monkeys are fed by park attendants, they are in the area of the hot springs all the year round, and a visit at any season will enable the visitor to observe hundreds of the macaques.

Jigokudani is not the farthest north that monkeys live. The Shimokita Peninsula is at the northern part of the Honshū island and the northwest area of this peninsula, latitude +41°31' longitude +140°56', approximately 500 km (310 mi) north from Jigokudani is the northern limit of Japanese macaque habitat.

The Jigokudani monkey park became famous after appearing in the documentary Baraka.

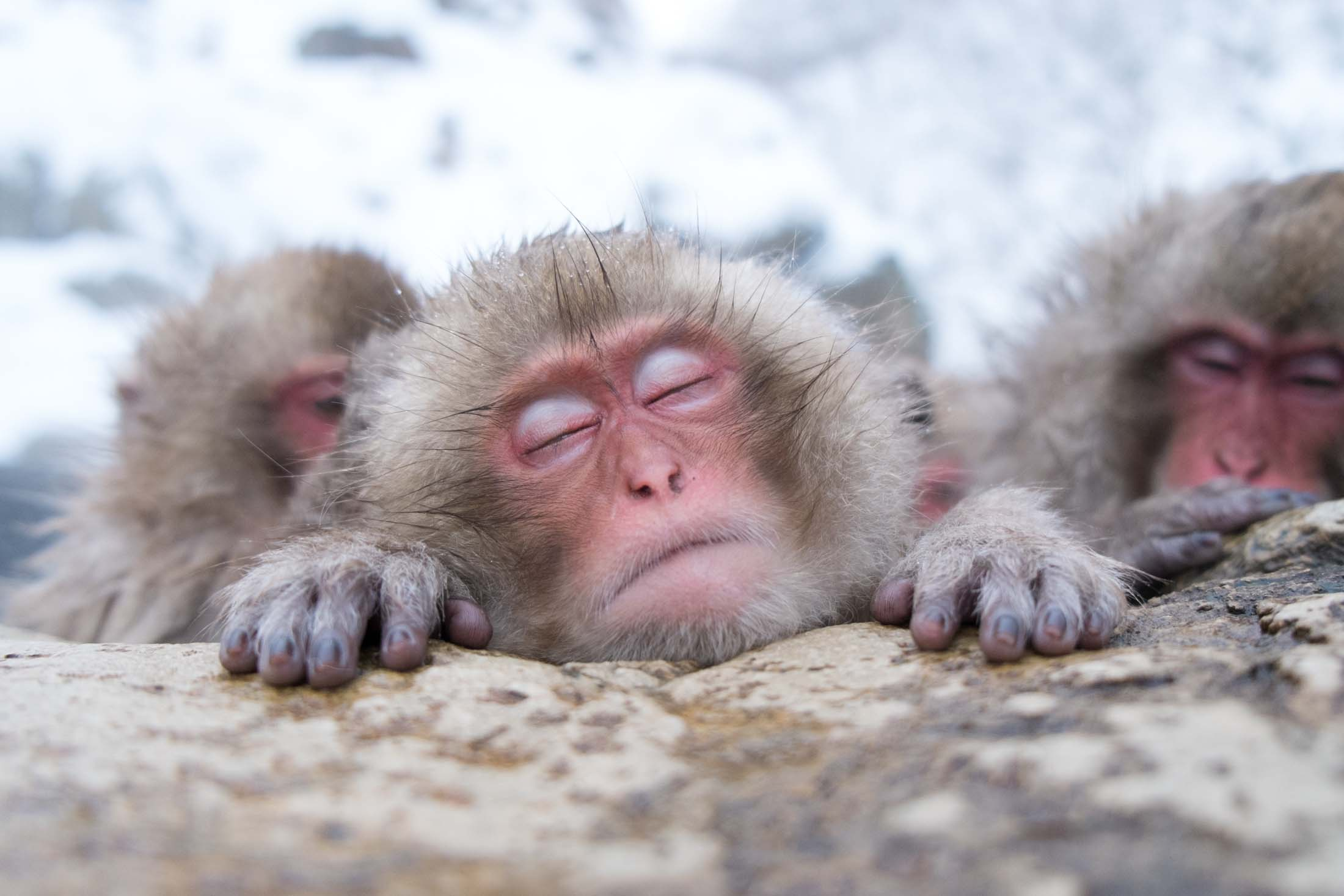
Baby snowmonkey in the hotspring

== Gallery ==
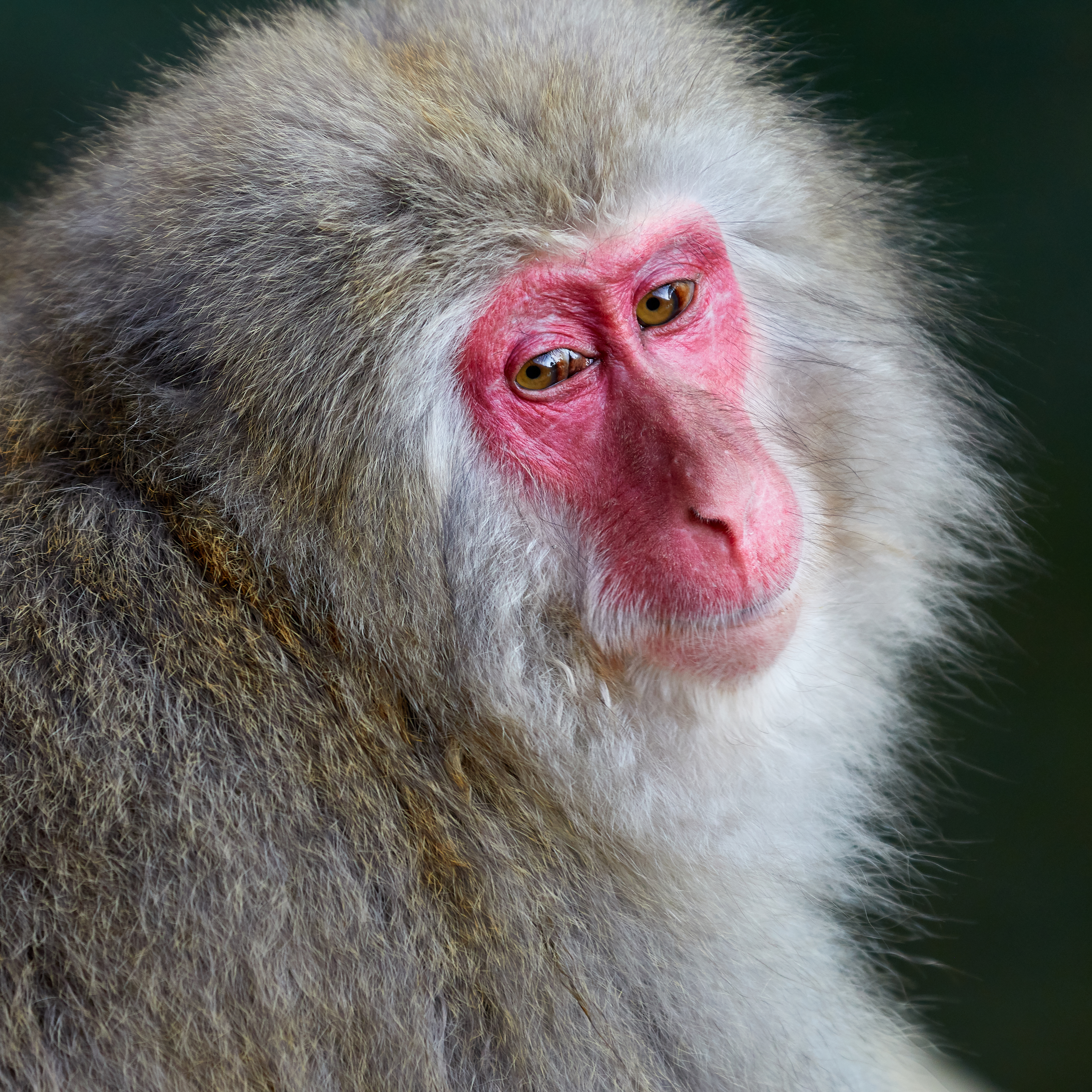
Headshot of a Japanese macaque at Jigokudani Monkey Park

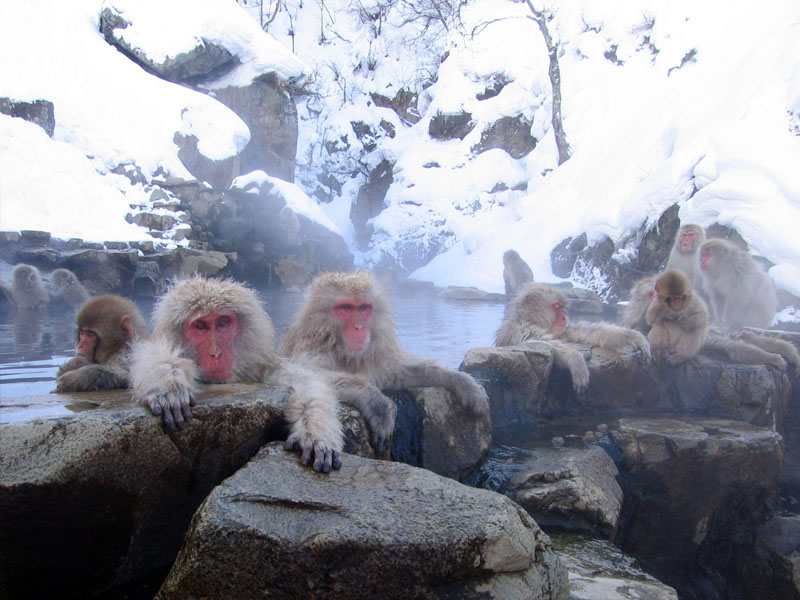
Macaques enjoying an onsen in Jigokudani Monkey Park

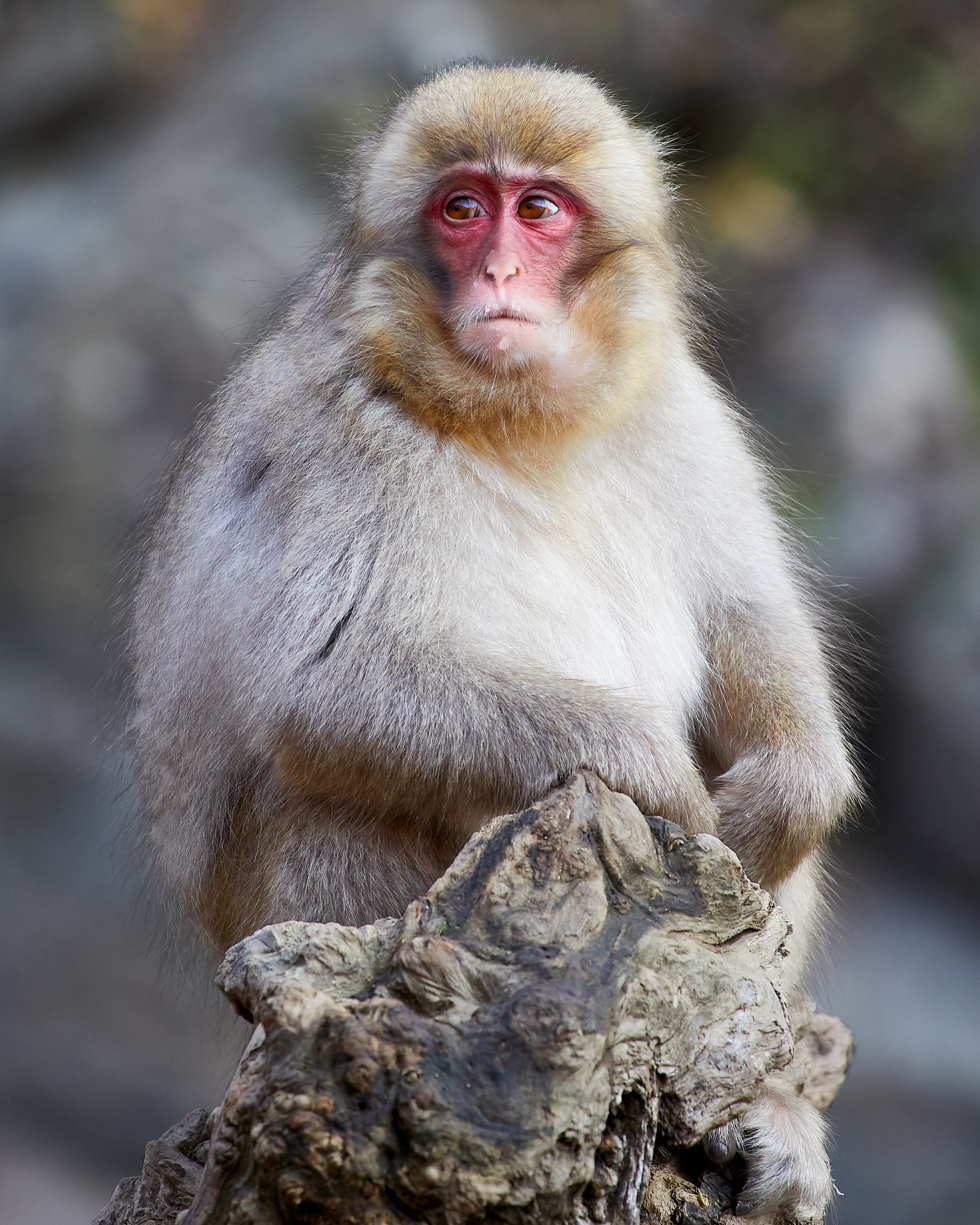
Young Japanese macaque at the Jigokudani Monkey Park

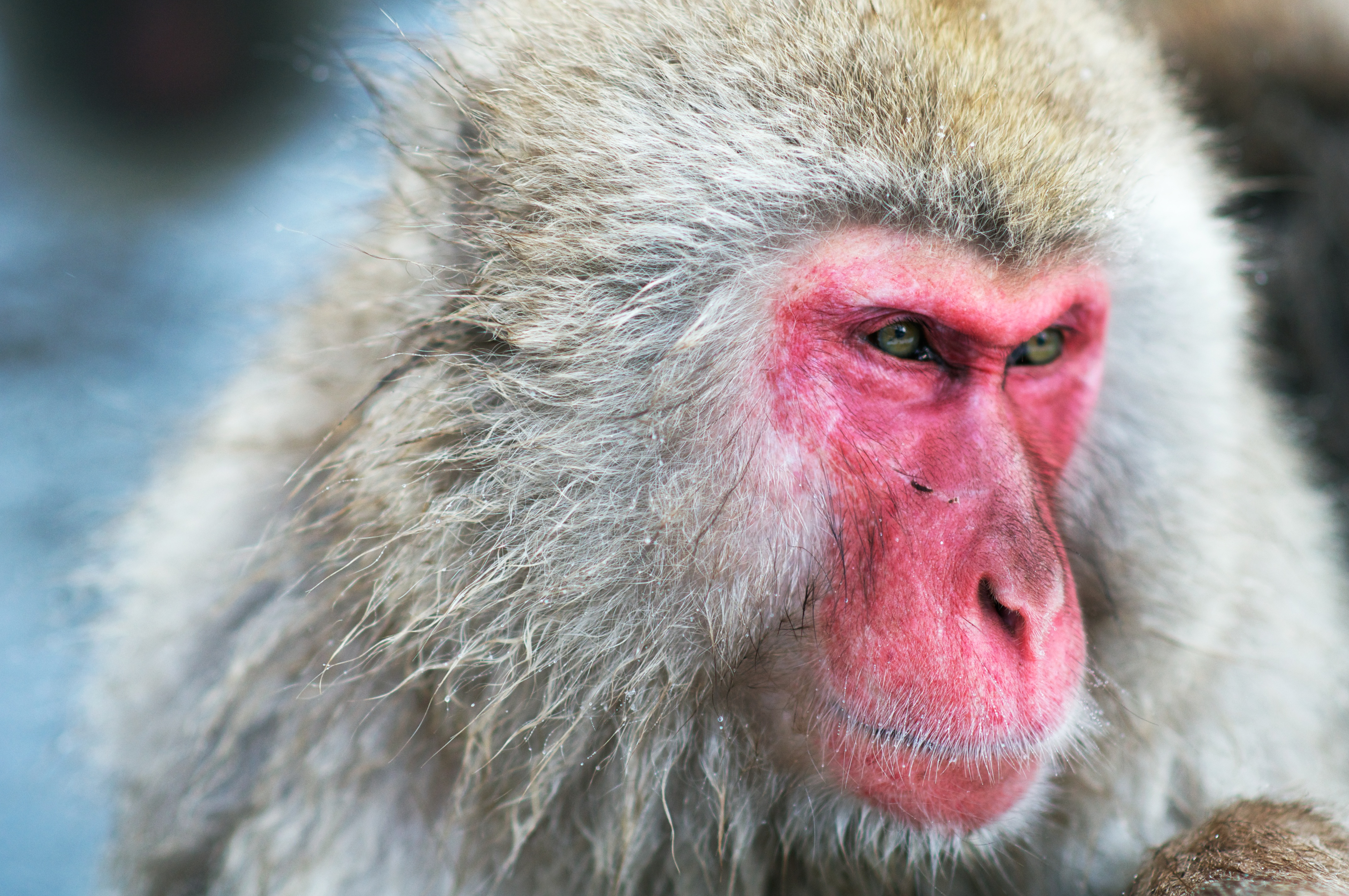
An alpha male at the Jigokudani Monkey Park

Japanese macaques grooming each other (video)
