= Sakae, Nagano =

Sakae 栄村
- Village
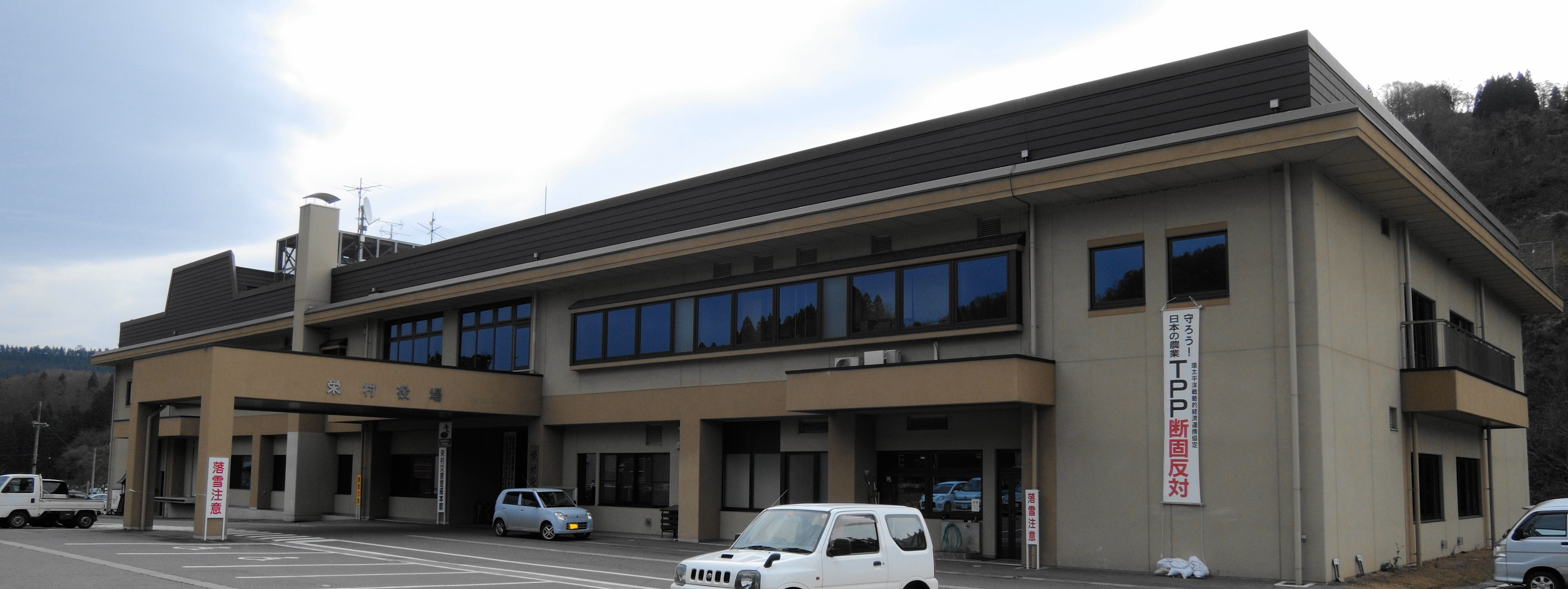
- Sakae Village Hall

- Flag Seal

- Location of Sakae in Nagano Prefecture

- Coordinates: 36°59′15.8″N 138°34′38″E
- Country: Japan
- Region: Chūbu (Kōshin'etsu)
- Prefecture: Nagano
- District: Shimominochi

Area
  - Total: 271.66 km^{2} (104.89 sq mi)

Population (April 2019)
  - Total: 1,828
  - Density: 6.729/km^{2} (17.43/sq mi)
- Time zone: UTC+9 (Japan Standard Time)
- Symbols
  - Tree: Paulownia tomentosa
  - Flower: Erythronium japonicum
  - Bird: Dollarbird
- Phone number: 0269-87-3111
- Address: 3433 Hokushin, Sakae-mura, Shimominochi-gun, Nagano-ken 389-2792
- Website: Official website

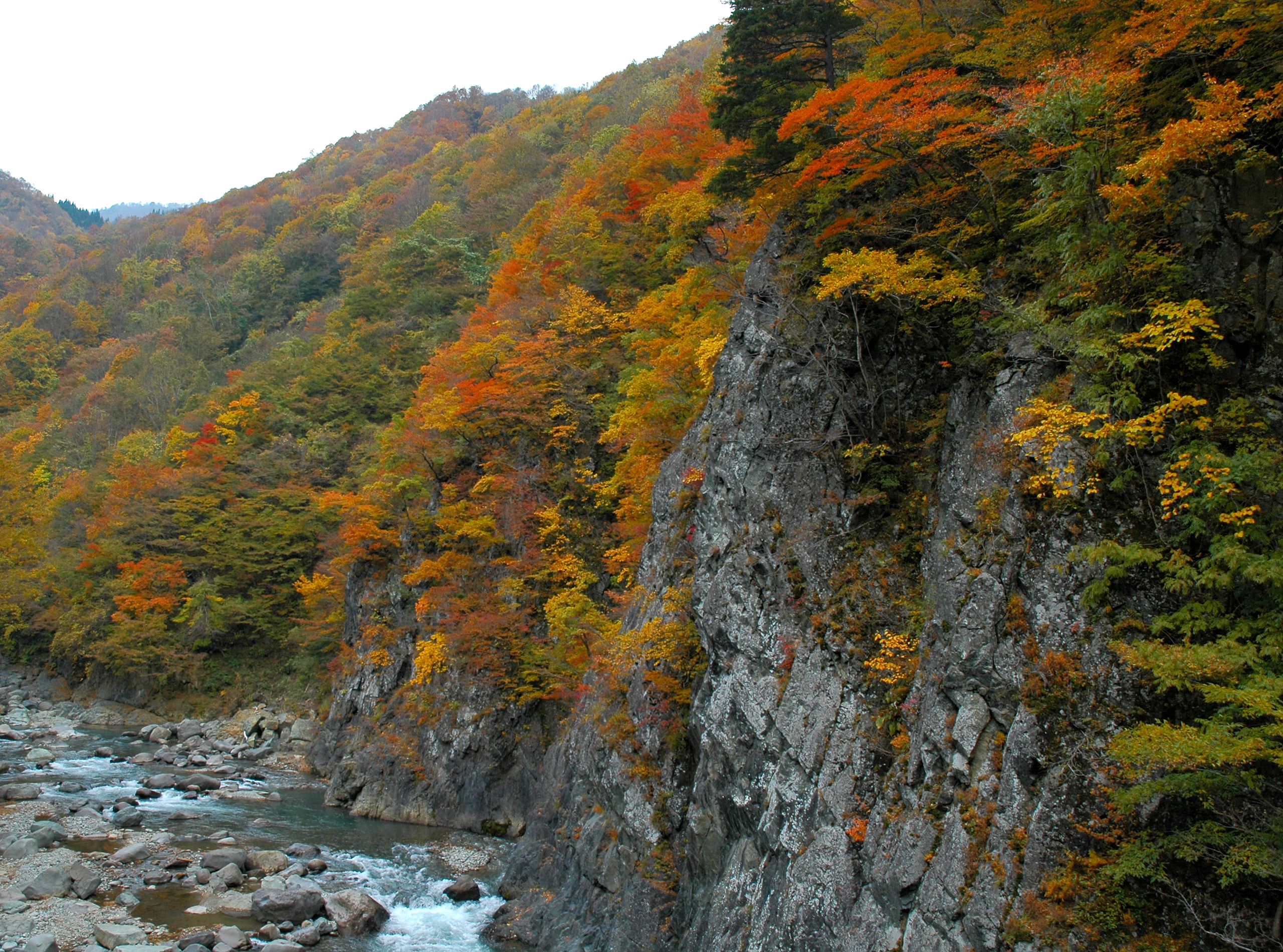
Akiyama hamlet in Sakae

Sakae (栄村, Sakae-mura) is a village located in Nagano Prefecture, Japan. As of 1 April 2019, the village had an estimated population of 1,828 in 817 households, and a population density of 6.7 persons per km^{2}. The total area of the village is 271.66 square kilometres (104.89 sq mi).

== Geography ==
Sakae is located in mountainous far northeastern Nagano Prefecture, bordered by Gunma Prefecture to the east and Niigata Prefecture to the north. The village is located in an area of severe winters with extremely heavy snowfall. The Chikuma River flows from west to east through the northern part of the village. Mount Naeba (2145 meters) is on the border of the village with Niigata Prefecture.

Through the northern part of the village, the JR Iiyama Line runs along the Chikuma River valley. The southern part of the village includes the remote area of Akiyama-go.

=== Surrounding municipalities ===
- Gunma Prefecture
  - Nakanojō
- Nagano Prefecture
  - Iiyama
  - Kijimadaira
  - Nozawaonsen
  - Yamanouchi
- Niigata Prefecture
  - Jōetsu
  - Tōkamachi
  - Tsunan
  - Yuzawa

=== Climate ===
The village has a humid continental climate characterized by warm and humid summers, and cold winters with extremely heavy snowfall (Köppen climate classification Dfb). The average annual temperature in Sakae is 8.2 °C. The average annual rainfall is 1579 mm with September as the wettest month. The temperatures are highest on average in August, at around 21.6 °C, and lowest in January, at around -4.1 °C.

== Demographics ==
Per Japanese census data, the population of Sakae has declined by more than 80 percent over the past 80 years.

Historical population
Year	Pop.	±%
1940	8,374	—
1950	7,067	−15.6%
1960	6,361	−10.0%
1970	4,449	−30.1%
1980	3,502	−21.3%
1990	3,053	−12.8%
2000	2,638	−13.6%
2010	2,215	−16.0%
2020	1,660	−25.1%

== History ==
The area of present-day Sakae was part of ancient Shinano Province. The village of Minochi in Shimominochi District and Sakai in Shimotakai District were established on April 1, 1889 by the establishment of the modern municipalities system. The two villages merged on September 30, 1956 to form Sakae.

== Education ==
Sakae has one public elementary school and one public middle school operated by the village government. The village does not have a high school.

== Miscellaneous ==
A minor planet had been named after the village -- 22885 Sakaemura

== Transportation ==
=== Railway ===
- East Japan Railway Company - Iiyama Line
  - Shinano-Shiratori - Hirataki - Yokokura - Mori-Miyanohara

=== Highway ===
- National Route 117
- National Route 405
