= Yokokura Station =

Yokokura Station is the name of two train stations in Japan.

- Yokokura Station (Miyagi) - (横倉駅) in Miyagi Prefecture
- Yokokura Station (Nagano) - (横倉駅) in Nagano Prefecture
