= Hirataki Station =

Railway station in Sakae, Nagano Prefecture, Japan

Hirataki Station 平滝駅
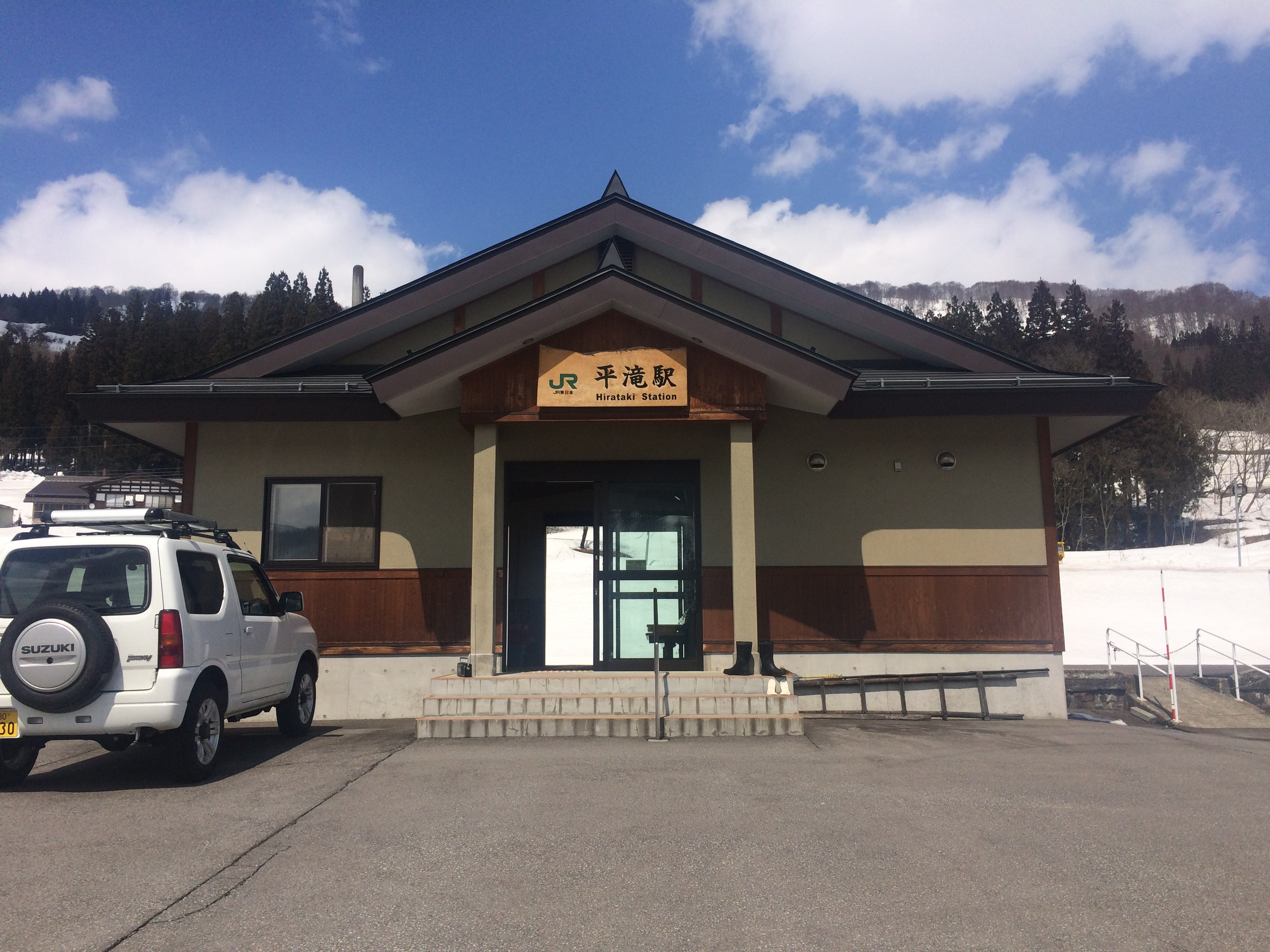
- Hirataki Station, March 2017

General information
- Location: Toyosakae, Sakae-mura, Shimominochi-gun, Nagano-ken 389-2701; Japan
- Coordinates: 36.9860°N 138.5336°E
- Elevation: 309.9 metres (1,017 ft)
- Operator: JR East
- Line: ■ Iiyama Line
- Distance: 44.7 kilometres (27.8 mi) from Toyono
- Platforms: 1 side platform
- Tracks: 1

Other information
- Status: Unstaffed
- Website: Official website

History
- Opened: 16 October 1931

Passengers
- FY2022: 4 (daily)

Services
Preceding station	JR East	Following station
Shinano-Shiratori towards Nagano	Iiyama Line	Yokokura towards Echigo-Kawaguchi
Location
- Location within Nagano Prefecture Location within Japan

Hirataki Station (平滝駅, Hirataki-eki) is a railway station on the Iiyama Line in the village of Sakae, Shimominochi District, Nagano Prefecture, Japan, operated by East Japan Railway Company (JR East).

== Lines ==
Hirataki Station is served by the Iiyama Line, and is 44.7 kilometers from the starting point of the line at Toyono Station.

== Station layout ==
The station consists of one side platform serving a single bi-directional platform. The station is unstaffed.

== History ==
Hirataki Station opened on 16 October 1931. With the privatization of Japanese National Railways (JNR) on 1 April 1987, the station came under the control of JR East. The station building was rebuilt in 2010.

== Passenger statistics ==
In fiscal 2020, the station was used by an average of 3 passengers daily (boarding passengers only).

In fiscal 2022, the station was used by an average of 4 passengers daily (boarding passengers only).

== Surrounding area ==
- Chikuma River
- Hirataki Post Office
- National Route 117

== See also ==
- List of railway stations in Japan
