= Shinano-Shiratori Station =

Railway station in Sakae, Nagano Prefecture, Japan

Shinano-Shiratori Station 信濃白鳥駅
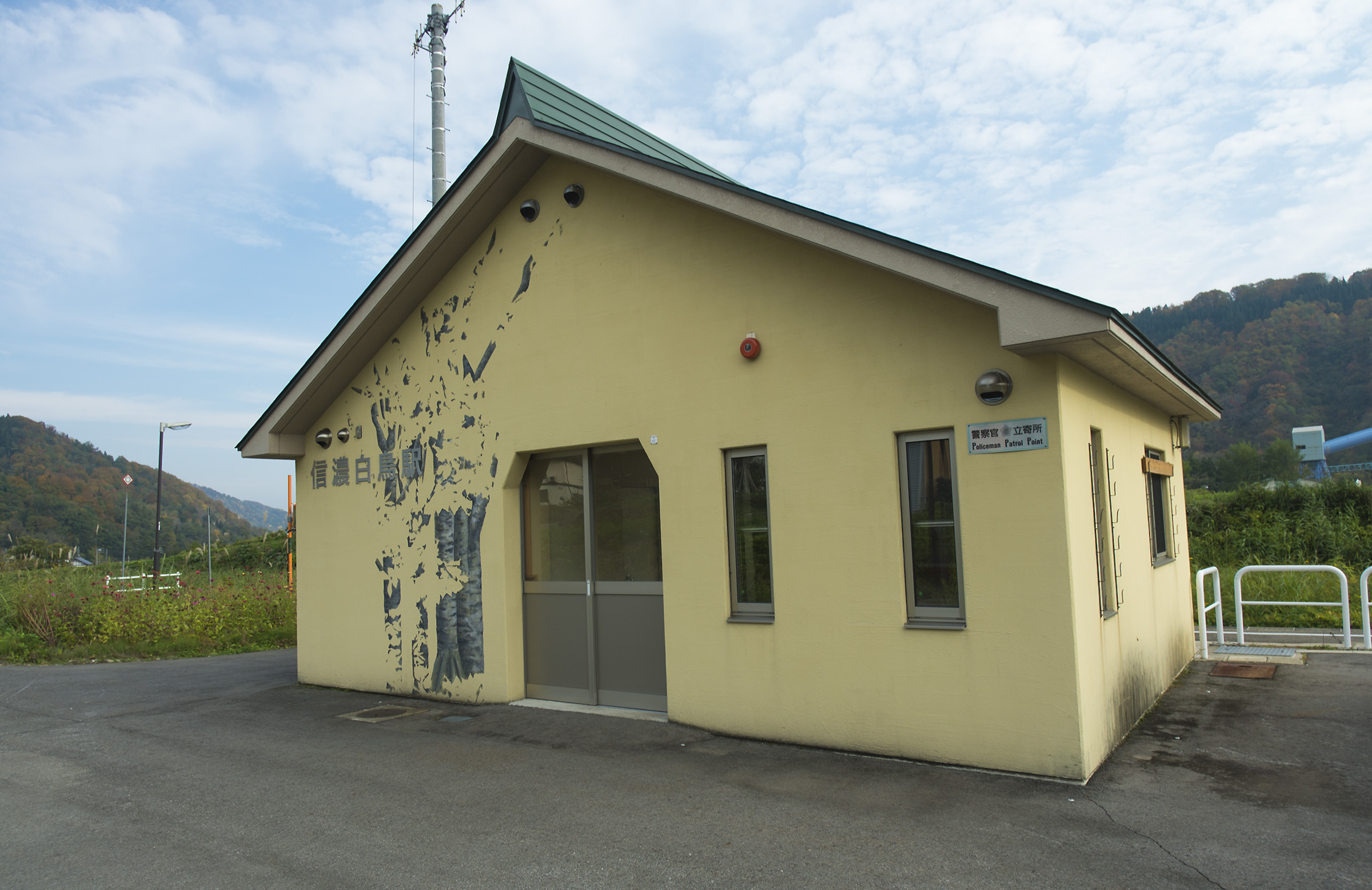
- Shinano-Shiratori Station, November 2013

General information
- Location: Toyosakae, Sakae-mura, Shimominochi-gun, Nagano-ken 389-2701; Japan
- Coordinates: 36.9834°N 138.5032°E
- Elevation: 332.3 metres (1,090 ft)
- Operator: JR East
- Line: ■ Iiyama Line
- Distance: 41.8 kilometres (26.0 mi) from Toyono
- Platforms: 1 side platform
- Tracks: 1

Other information
- Website: Official website

History
- Opened: 19 November 1925

Passengers
- FY2017: 9 (daily)

Services
Preceding station	JR East	Following station
Nishi-Ōtaki towards Nagano	Iiyama Line	Hirataki towards Echigo-Kawaguchi
Location
- Location within Nagano Prefecture Location within Japan

Shinano-Shiratori Station (信濃白鳥駅, Shinano-Shiratori-eki) is a railway station on the Iiyama Line, East Japan Railway Company (JR East), in Toyosakae in the village of Sakae, Shimominochi District, Nagano Prefecture, Japan.

== Lines ==
Shinano-Shiratori Station is served by the Iiyama Line, and is 41.8 kilometers from the starting point of the line at Toyono Station.

== Station layout ==
The station consists of one side platform serving a single bi-directional track. The station is staffed.

== History ==
Shinano-Shiratori Station opened on 19 November 1925. With the privatization of Japanese National Railways (JNR) on 1 April 1987, the station came under the control of JR East. A new station building was completed in 2008.

== Passenger statistics ==
In fiscal 2017, the station was used by an average of 9 passengers daily (boarding passengers only).

== Surrounding area ==
- Chikuma River
- National Route 117

== See also ==
- List of railway stations in Japan
