= Sano ruins =

Archaeological site in Japan

Sano Ruins
- 佐野遺跡 (Japanese)
- Sano Ruins Sano ruins (Japan)
- 36°43′56″N 138°24′26″E
- Type: settlement
- Periods: Jōmon period
- Location: Yamanouchi, Nagano, Japan
- Region: Chūbu region

Site notes
- Public access: Yes (no public facilities)

The Sano Ruins (佐野遺跡, Sano-iseki) is an archaeological site containing the ruins of a late-Jōmon period settlement located in the Sano neighborhood of the town of Yamanouchi, Nagano in the Chūbu region of Japan. The site was designated a National Historic Site of Japan in 1976.

== Overview ==
Sano site is located in the southern portion of Yamanouchi Basin, where the Yamase River flows down from the Shiga Highlands. In the late 1930s, the discovery of Kamegaoka pottery from far northern Mutsu Province at this location attracted considerable attention, indicating long-distance trade during the Jōmon period. Subsequent archaeological excavations have uncovered the traces of a large-scale settlement, and further examples of a distinctive local style of Jōmon pottery, which was named the "Sano style". In the Shinano region, ruins from the middle Jōmon period (3000–2000 BCE) are numerous, but the number drops drastically during the late Jōmon period (2000–1000 BCE).

The site is located approximately ten minutes by car from Yudanaka Station on the Nagano Electric Railway, but is only an open field with a stone marker.

== See also ==
- List of Historic Sites of Japan (Nagano)
