= Naoko Hirakura =

Japanese architect

Naoko Hirakura (Japanese: 平倉 直子, Hirakura Naoko; born 27 May 1950) is a Japanese architect. She is the founder and principal of Naoko Hirakura Architect & Associates (有限会社平倉直子建築設計事務所), a Tokyo-based practice whose work focuses on residential architecture, small-scale public facilities, and landscape-related design.

== Career ==
Hirakura established Naoko Hirakura Architect & Associates in 1978. Her work has been carried out primarily in Japan and includes single-family houses, community facilities, police buildings, and projects involving landscape and public space.

Her best-known projects include the Tokiwadai House in Itabashi, Tokyo (1997), and the natural-learning facilities in the Kazawa area of Jōshin’etsu-kōgen National Park, comprising the Forest Path and the Kazawa Information Center (2003–2006). She also designed the Mita police box of Meguro Police Station, known as Akari no Kōban, Part 1 (1994), and the Ebisu 4-chōme police box, Akari no Kōban, Part 2 (1996), in Shibuya, Tokyo.

Tokiwadai House was included in Catherine Croft's Concrete Architecture (Gibbs Smith, 2004) as an example of contemporary concrete architecture.

=== Selected works ===
- Tokiwadai House (Tokiwadai no Sumai), Itabashi, Tokyo, 1997.
- House at Tomigaya (Tomigaya no Sumai: Uchi to Soto no Uchi), Shibuya, Tokyo, 1999.
- Housing in Hazawa (Hazawa no Sumai), Tokyo, 1993.
- Mita police box, Meguro Police Station, Tokyo Metropolitan Police Department (Akari no Kōban, Part 1), Tokyo, 1994.
- Ebisu 4-chōme police box (Akari no Kōban, Part 2), Shibuya, Tokyo,1996.
- Kazawa natural-learning facilities, Jōshin’etsu-kōgen National Park, including the Forest Path and Kazawa Information Center, Gunma Prefecture, 2003–2006.

== Awards ==
- Tokyo Architecture Award, residential category, Grand Prize (1996), for Housing in Hazawa.
- Meguro Ward Landscape Award (1995), for the Mita police box, Akari no Kōban, Part 1.
- New Face Award, New Japan Architects Association (1998), for Tokiwadai House.
- Architectural Institute of Japan Prize, Achievement Division (2008), for the Kazawa natural-learning facilities.
- Japan Society of Civil Engineers Landscape Design Award (2010), for the Kazawa natural-learning facilities.
- Chiba City Excellent Architecture Award (2001), for Tsuga no Sumai.

== See also ==
- Women in architecture
