= Yomase Station =

Railway station in Yamanouchi, Nagano Prefecture, Japan

Yomase Station 夜間瀬駅
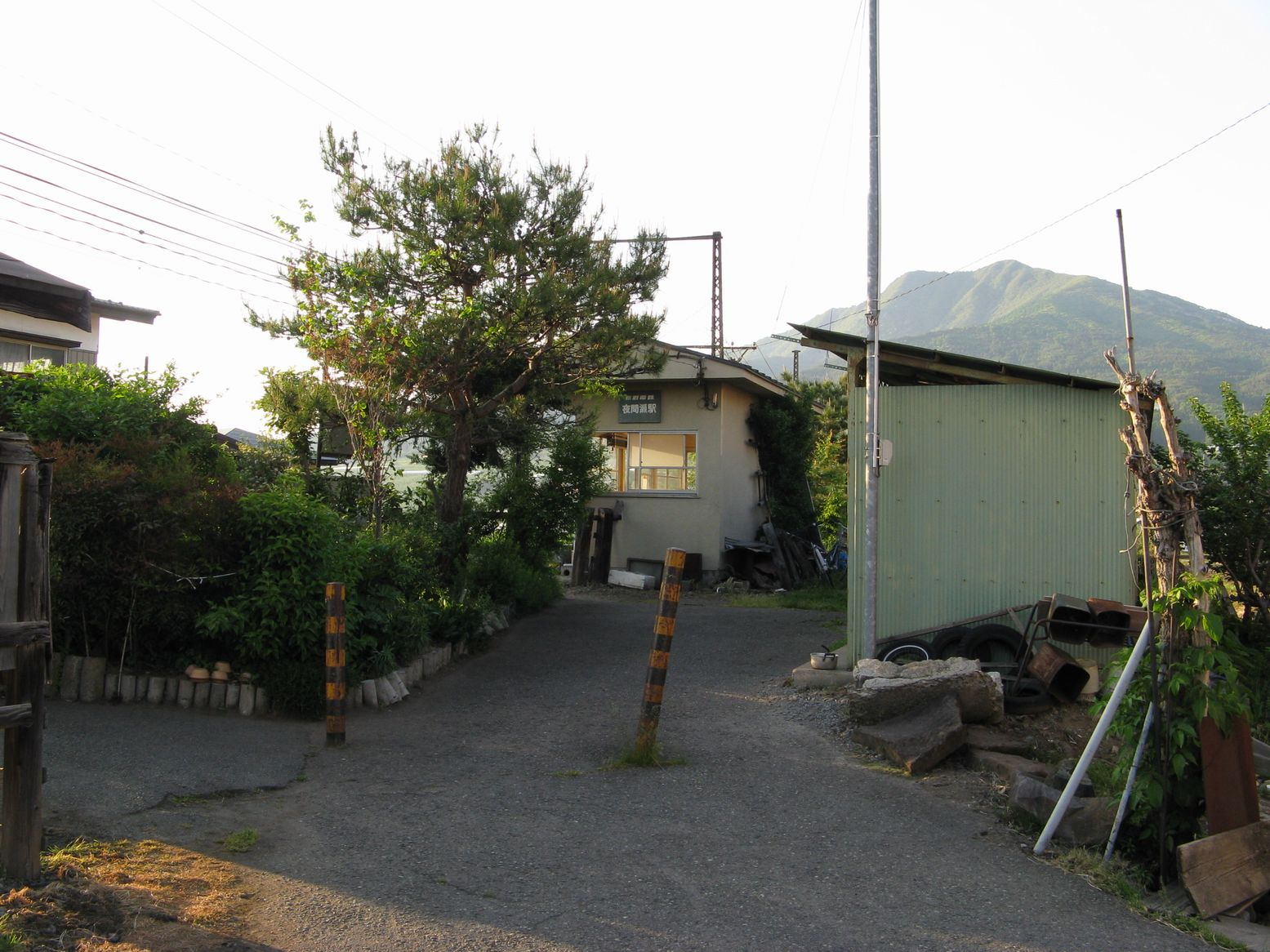
- Yomase Station in May 2009

General information
- Location: 2493-2 Yomase, Shimotakai-gun Yamanouchi-machi, Nagano-ken 381-0405; Japan
- Coordinates: 36°45′35.8″N 138°24′12.2″E
- Operator: Nagano Electric Railway
- Line: ■ Nagano Electric Railway Nagano Line
- Distance: 30.4 km from Nagano
- Platforms: 1 side platform
- Tracks: 1

Other information
- Status: unstaffed
- Station code: N22
- Website: Official website

History
- Opened: 28 April 1927

Passengers
- FY2015: 77 daily
Location
- Location within Nagano Prefecture Location within Japan

Yomase Station (夜間瀬駅, Yomase-eki) is a railway station in the town of Yamanouchi, Nagano, Japan, operated by the private railway operating company Nagano Electric Railway.

== Lines ==
Yomase Station is a station on the Nagano Electric Railway Nagano Line and is 30.4 kilometers from the terminus of the line at Nagano Station.

== Station layout ==
The station consists of one ground-level side platform serving a single bi-directional track. The station is unattended.

== Adjacent stations ==
«	Service	»
Nagano Electric Railway
Express-A: Does not stop at this station
Express-B: Does not stop at this station
Shinano-Takehara	Local	Kamijō

== History ==
The station opened on 28 April 1927.

== Passenger statistics ==
In fiscal 2015, the station was used by an average of 77 passengers daily (boarding passengers only).

== Surrounding area ==
- National Route 403

== See also ==
- List of railway stations in Japan
