= Mount Higashidate =

Mountain in Japan

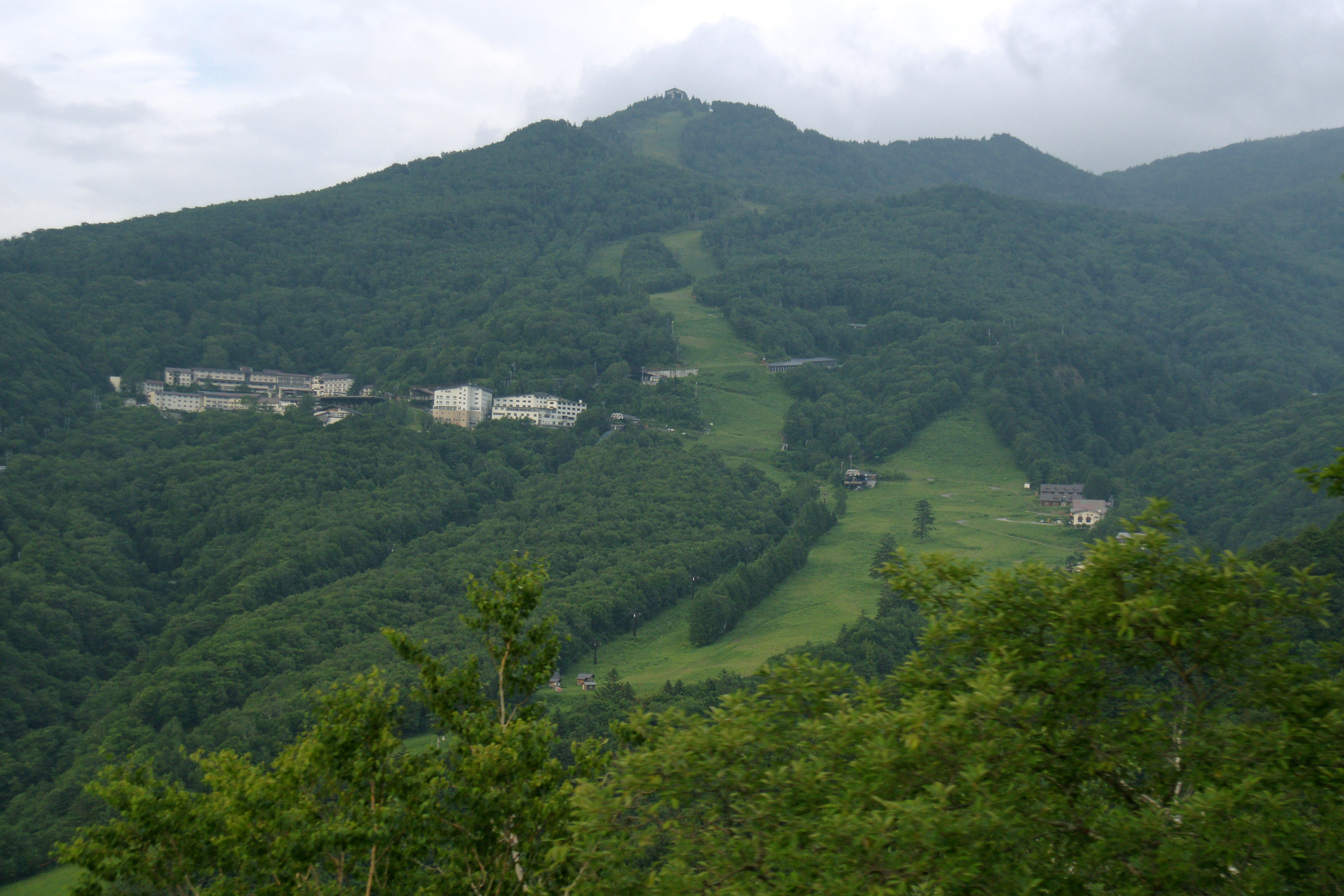
- Mount Higashidate in July 2009

Highest point
- Coordinates: 36°43′58″N 138°31′25″E

Naming
- Native name: 東館山 (Japanese)

Geography
- Location within Japan

Mount Higashidate (東館山, Higashitate-yama) is a mountain in Japan located in Yamanouchi, Nagano. For the 1998 Winter Olympics, it hosted the alpine skiing giant slalom events.

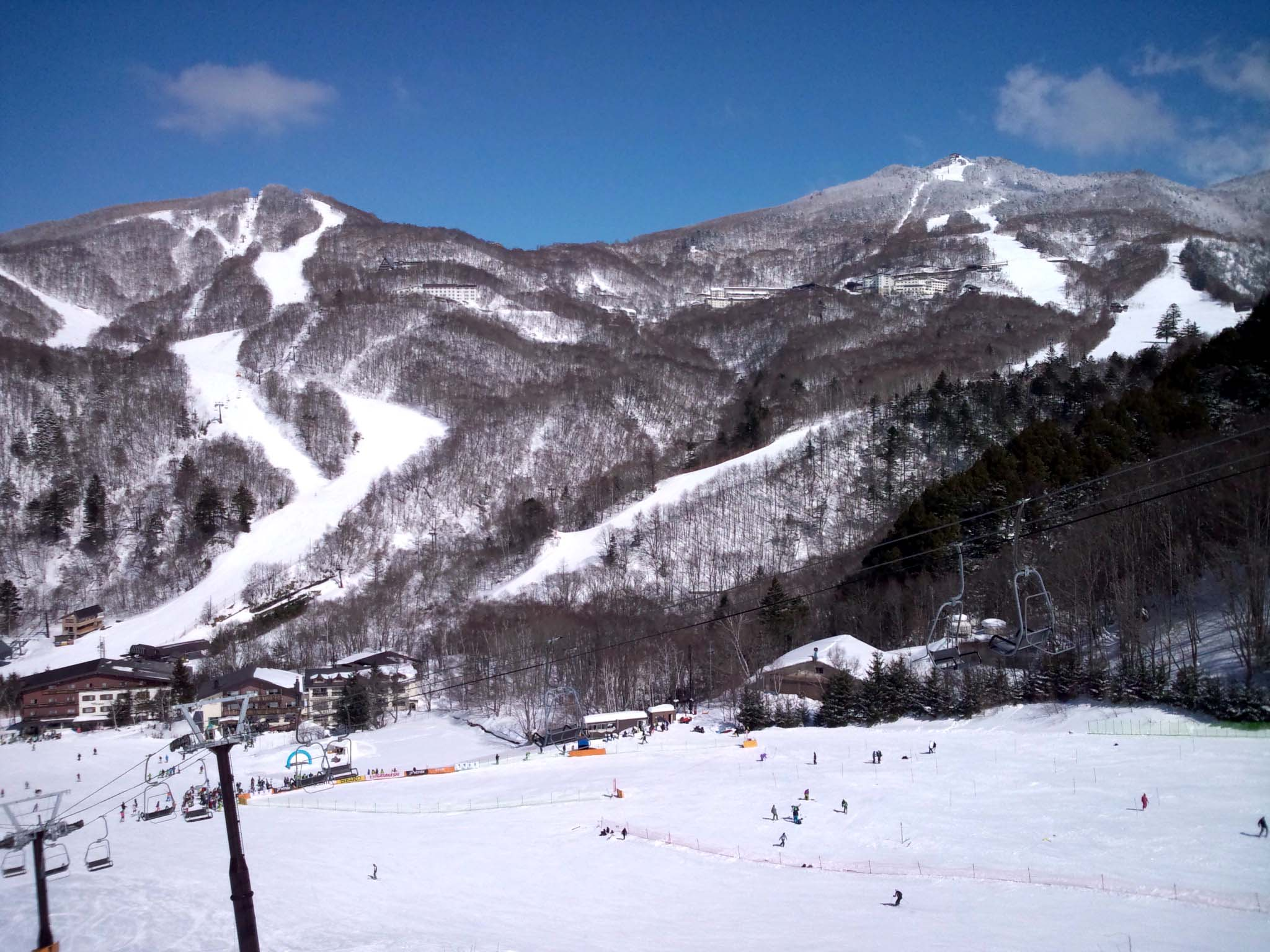
Right: Mount Higashidate / Left: Mount Nishidate
