= Shiga Highlands =

Skiing and hiking area in Japan

Coordinates: 36°42′21″N 138°30′28″E

Shiga-kōgen, 2009

Shiga Kogen (志賀高原, Shiga-kōgen) is a ski resort and hiking spot, located in the Jōshin'etsu-kōgen National Park in the highlands of Yamanouchi, Nagano, Japan. In 1980, an area of 13,000 hectares (50 sq mi) was designated a UNESCO Man and the Biosphere Reserve.

== Ski resort ==
At 4.25 square kilometres (1.64 sq mi), Shiga-kōgen is arguably the largest ski resort in Japan, as well as the second highest in elevation. The resort is made up of 18 smaller, interconnected ski fields, with 48 lifts in total. Starting in winter 2015-16 all of Shiga-kōgen became open to skiers and snowboarders (previously some areas were restricted to skiers only).

The resort was the site of several events in the 1998 Nagano Olympics. There are more than 100 hotels in the area, with Japanese style or washitsu (和室), Western style or semi-Japanese style rooms.

=== Ski season ===
Shiga-kōgen has one of the longest ski seasons in Japan, with the official ski season commencing from mid-to-late November and continuing throughout April and until Golden Week, the first week of May.

Christmas and the New Year's season is the peak period in Shiga-kōgen during the Japanese school holiday break. From April 1 onward, the spring ski season begins with lift ticket discounts offered and the Maruike, Hasuike, and Sunvalley ski areas cease operation.

=== Transportation ===
During the ski season, the free Shiga-kōgen Ski Shuttle Bus is provided for transportation across the ski resorts and various ski fields and hotel areas. The buses are usually quite punctual to the minute but this can vary with the weather conditions so it is recommended that guests take an earlier bus where possible. During the season, the shuttle bus between resorts operates Monday to Sunday unless there is a severe snow or other weather warning, which can often see services terminate early.

There are also buses that travel to and from Nagano station and Iiyama Station to both Shiga-kōgen and Yudanaka.

Several convenient car parks are also available near the resorts for those who are travelling with their own vehicle.

=== Driving conditions ===
During the winter season, the road leading to Shiga-kōgen is often wet and icy and roads into resorts are often covered with snow. The road is steep and rough, and flanked by larger dropoffs. Snow tires are mandatory, and four wheel drive is recommended.

=== Convenience stores and groceries ===
Shiga-kōgen does not have any supermarkets or major grocery stores. There are a few small convenience stores mostly located inside hotels including the Hotel Shiga Sunvalley. There are larger stores (part of a chain of convenience stores called "Yamazaki Store") inside Hotel Japan Shiga, Olympic Hotel and Villa Ichinose which has bread, other baked goods, sandwiches, cold beverages, beer, sake and other alcoholic beverages, chocolate, biscuits, ice-cream, band-aids and sports tape. At the Yokoteyama area, there's Yamazaki Store inside Shiga Palace Hotel. It is also complete with the usual goods with the addition of stuff for daily necessities, personal hygiene, souvenir items, Shiga Kogen local beers, wine and sake and vending machines for beers, softdrinks and ice cream.

== Onsen hot springs ==
Shiga-kōgen was famous as an onsen (hot spring) location before skiing became popular. Shiga-kōgen ski resort is home to over seven natural hot spring sources. Many hotels are sourced by the Shiga Mountain hot springs and there are numerous onsen bath facilities located within the hotels across the resort.

== Other activities ==
Shirakaba or Japanese white birch (Betula platyphylla var. japonica), on the left, and dakekamba or Erman's birch (Betula ermanii), on the right. Two typical Shiga-kōgen's trees

According to the book National Parks of Japan, published by Natural Parks Foundation:

"Shiga-kōgen has more than 40 lakes and ponds" and "Joshinetsu National Park is a habitat for Japanese Macaques and Japanese Serows. "Also, "the vegetation in the park area changes as the altitude becomes higher, from beech (Fagus crenata) and Japanese oak (Quercus crispula) woods to coniferous forests. In many mountains, communities of alpine plants can be seen. Woods of Japanese larches (Larix kaempferi) and White Birches (Betula platyphylla var. japonica) which cover the plateaus are especially beautiful."

All these characteristics made Shiga-kōgen an interesting spot to hiking and enjoy the nature all seasons of the year.

It is possible to fish in Shiga-kōgen at Maru-ike (Maru Pond) and Biwa-ike (Biwa Pond). You can also fish at Zako River, with a fishing license. Zako River is one of a few habitats for iwana fishing. Fishing is prohibited from October 1 till April 5. Boats are also available for rent at Biwa Pond, Maru Pond, and Kido Pond.

Some of the other activities in the area include golfing at Ogushiga, horse riding at Maru Pond, bicycles for rent at Okushiga, and numerous tennis courts in the Yakebitai and Okushiga Area.

== Sightseeing ==
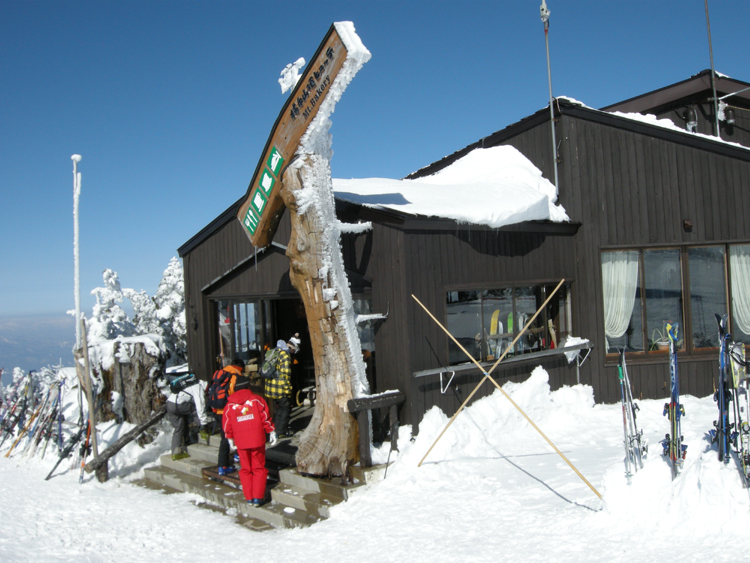
Yokoteyama's Bakery - Shiga-kōgen, 2009

Unjō no Yado Yokote Sanchō Hyutte (mountain hut) is a restaurant, bakery, and hotel. Located at 2,305 m (7,562 ft) above sea level, the bakery claims to be the highest in Japan.

The Nagano Prefecture Shiga Kogen Nature Preservation Center is housed in Shiga Kogen Sogo Kaikan 98. The main focus is the "Relationship between Nature and Human Being", which exhibits the nature of Shiga-kōgen.

The Commemorative Hall of the Nagano Winter Olympics and Paralympic in 1998 is located in the Hasu-ike area. Medals and other memorabilia are displayed.

The Higashitateyama Botanical Garden is located on top of Mt. Higashitate (2,020 m [6,630 ft]), and includes nature trails.

The Shinshu University Scientific Research Institute is located in the forest surrounding Mt. Shiga. The lava-based soil in the area makes it a rare area in the world. A Nature Observation Trail is opened to the public.

== See also ==
- Jigokudani Monkey Park

== Gallery ==
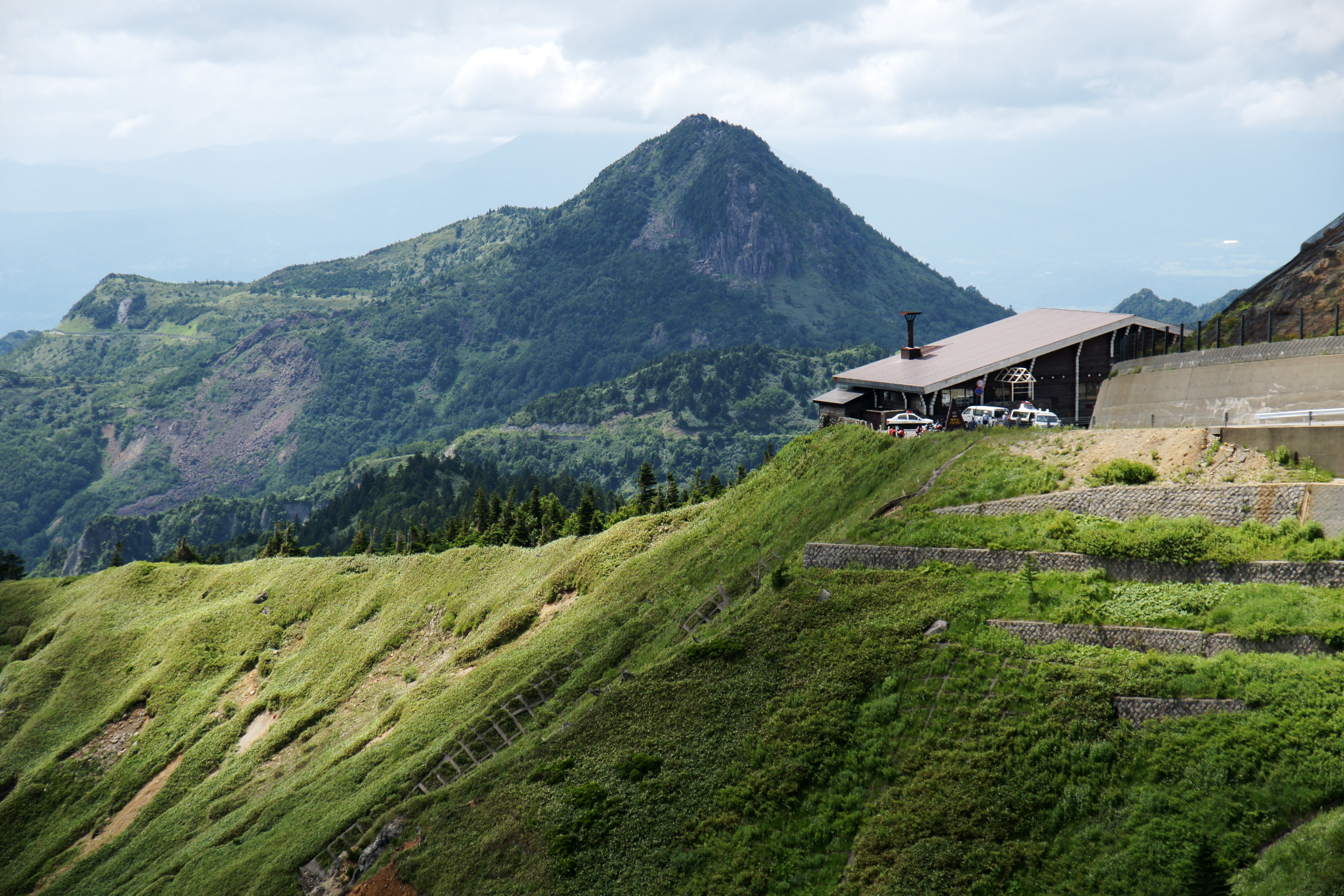
Mount Kasa view from Shiga Highlands

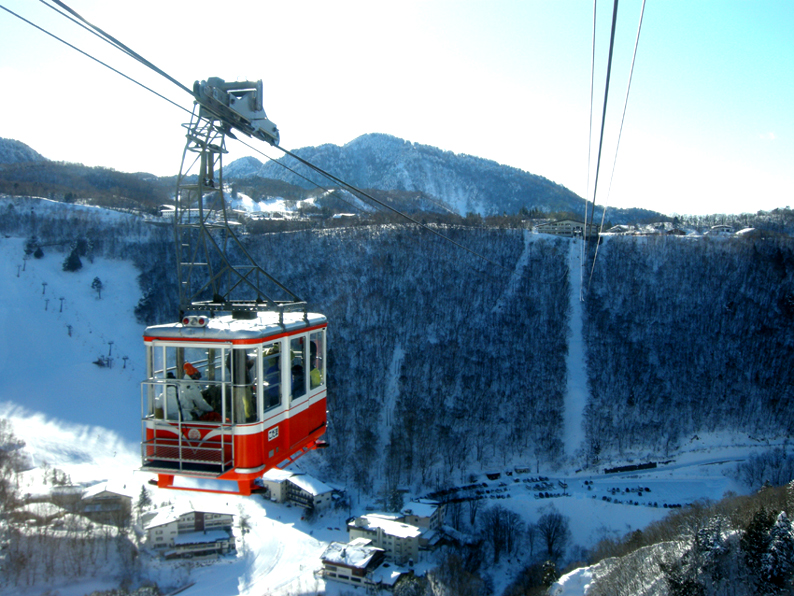
Shiga Kogen Hasuike Ropeway and Giant Ski area on the left, 2009

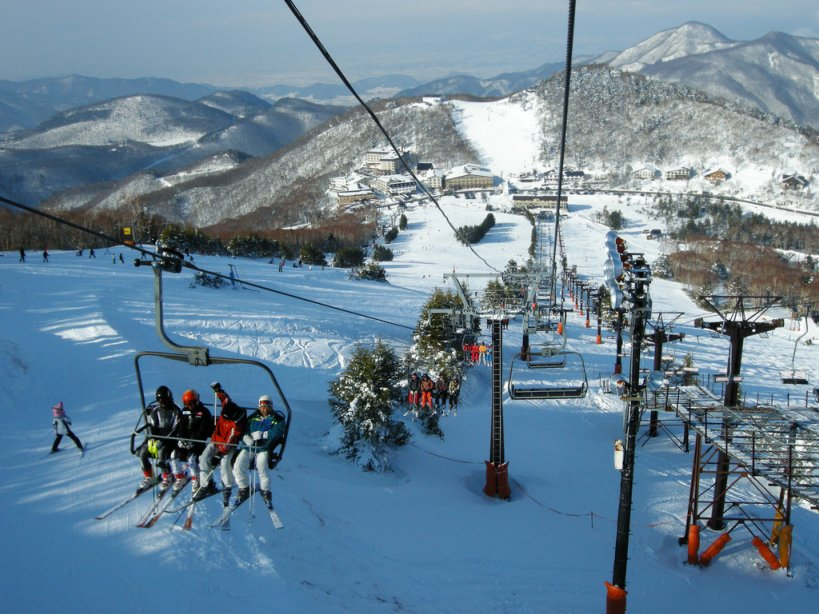
Takamagahara ski lift, December 2008

Snowshoe hiking at Higashitate-yama, January 2009

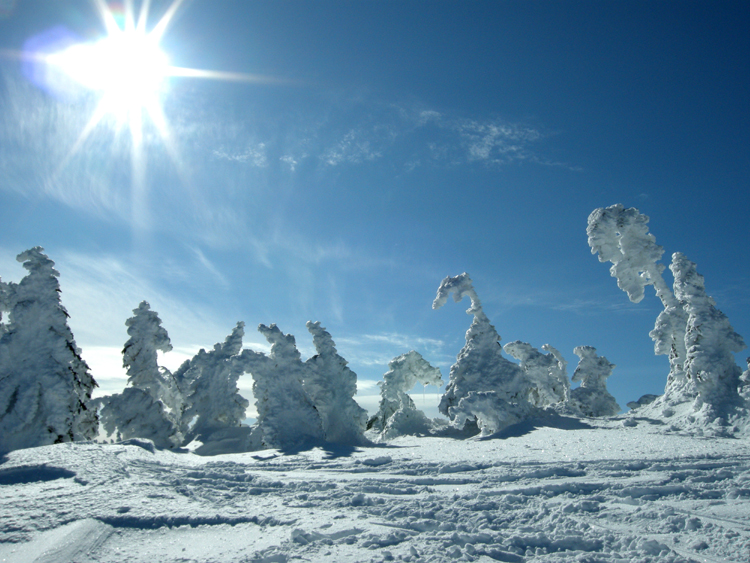
Summit of Yokote-yama - 2,305 m (7,562 ft) above sea level - Shiga-kōgen, 2009
