= Yamanouchi, Nagano =

Yamanouchi 山ノ内町
- Town
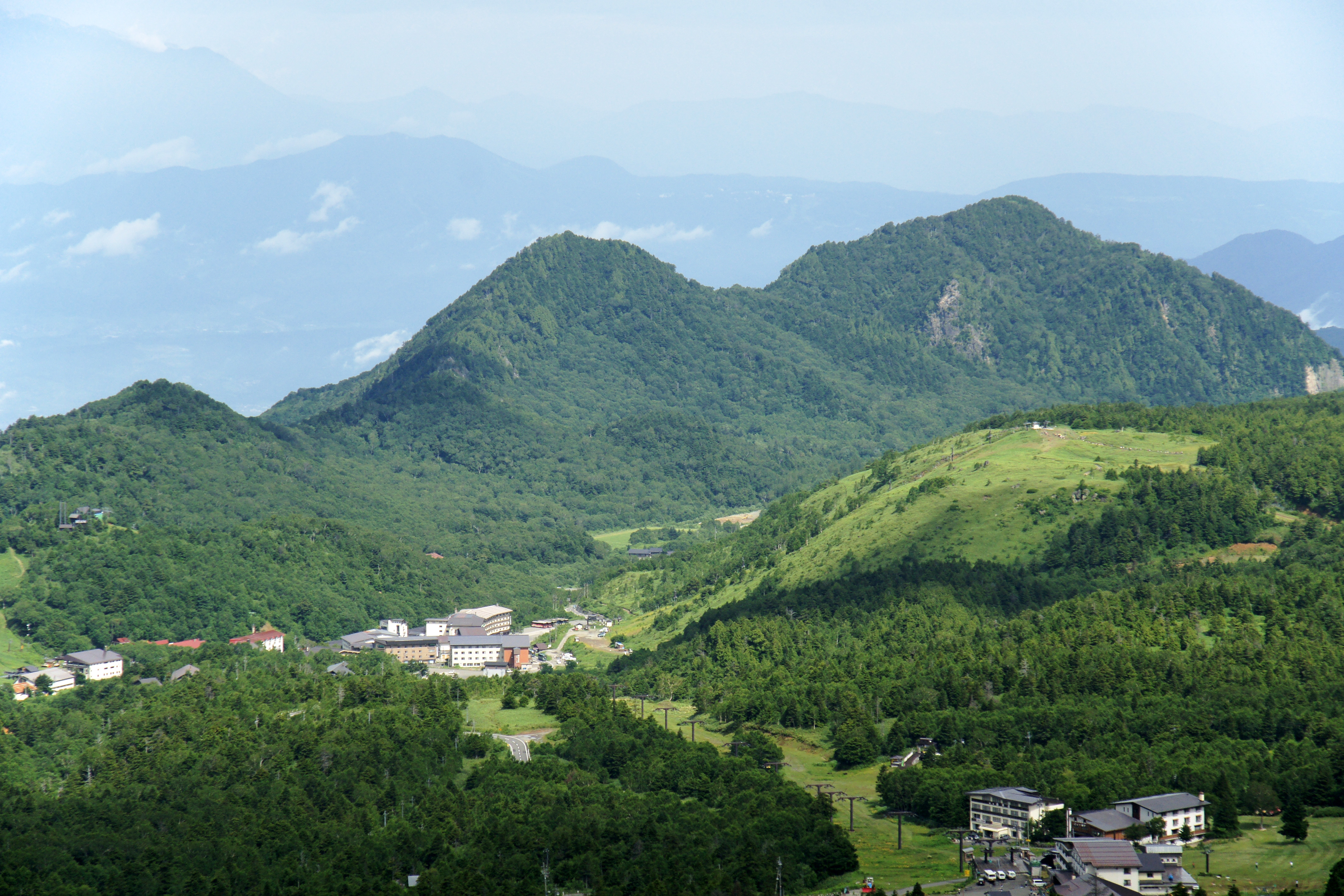
- Shiga Kogen Highlands

- Flag Seal

- Location of Yamanouchi in Nagano Prefecture

- Coordinates: 36°44′40.5″N 138°24′45.7″E
- Country: Japan
- Region: Chūbu (Kōshin'etsu)
- Prefecture: Nagano
- District: Shimotakai

Area
  - Total: 265.90 km^{2} (102.66 sq mi)

Population (April 2019)
  - Total: 12,403
  - Density: 46.645/km^{2} (120.81/sq mi)
- Time zone: UTC+9 (Japan Standard Time)
- Symbols
  - Tree: Tsuga sieboldii
  - Flower: Apple
  - Bird: Japanese bush warbler
- Phone number: 0269-33-3111
- Address: 3352-1 Hirao, Yamanouchi-machi, Shimotakai-gun, Nagano-ken 381-0498
- Website: Official website

Yamanouchi (山ノ内町, Yamanouchi-machi) is a town located in Shimotakai District in Nagano Prefecture, Japan. As of 1 April 2019, the town had an estimated population of 12,403 in 5020 households, and a population density of 47 persons per km^{2}. The total area of the town is 265.90 square kilometres (102.66 sq mi).

Yamanouchi, located in the Japanese Alps, includes Shiga Highlands, one of the largest ski resorts in Japan. The town of Yamanouchi hosted three venues during the 1998 Winter Olympics: Snowboarding Half-pipe events were held at Kanbayashi Snowboard Park and the technical events of Alpine skiing were held at Mount Higashidate and Mount Yakebitai. The town of Yamanouchi is a gateway to Jōshin'etsu-kōgen National Park via Route 292, the Shiga-Kusatsu-Kogen Highway. This route is a mountain-ridge which connects Yamanouchi to Karuizawa in the south.

Yamanouchi is also home to Jigokudani Monkey Park where Japanese macaques can be found soaking in an outdoor hot spring. These macaques were part of the opening sequence in Baraka, the 1992 non-narrative documentary film directed by Ron Fricke.

== Geography ==
Shimotakai District, in northern mountainous Nagano Prefecture, comprises Yamanouchi town, Kijimadaira Village, and Nozawaonsen Village. Yamanouchi is the largest of these. More than 90% of Yamanouchi is covered by mountains and forests. The town measures approximately 39 kilometers east-west and 12 kilometers north-south (266 square kilometers), and has an elevation ranging from 424 meters to 2341 meters. The surrounding area is known for its forest therapy.

In winter, damp air from the Japan Sea hits the mountains causing heavy snowing. Many ski resorts operate in the area. The plateau above the town is dotted with over 70 large and small wetlands and ponds which can be traced to volcanic activity. The main mountains include Mt. Yokote, Mt. Uriwa, Mt. Iwasugeyama, Mt. Shiga, and Mt. Kousha.

=== Surrounding municipalities ===
- Gunma Prefecture
  - Nakanojō
- Nagano Prefecture
  - Kijimadaira
  - Nakano
  - Sakae
  - Takayama

=== Climate ===
The town has a humid continental climate characterized by warm and humid summers, and cold winters with heavy snowfall (Köppen climate classification Dfb). The average annual temperature in Yamanouchi is 2.7 °C. The average annual rainfall is 2020 mm with September as the wettest month. The temperatures are highest on average in August, at around 15.6 °C, and lowest in January, at around -9.7 °C.

== Demographics ==
The population of Yamanouchi has declined since the 1950s.

Historical population
Year	Pop.	±%
1940	15,617	—
1950	20,114	+28.8%
1960	19,645	−2.3%
1970	19,166	−2.4%
1980	18,964	−1.1%
1990	17,680	−6.8%
2000	15,900	−10.1%
2010	13,678	−14.0%
2020	11,352	−17.0%

== History ==
Stone tools from the Japanese Paleolithic period, pottery from the Jōmon period, and 9 burial mounds from the Kofun period have been excavated in the area.

The area of present-day Yamanouchi was part of ancient Shinano Province. The modern town of Yamanouchi was established on April 1, 1955 by the merger of the town of Hirao with the neighboring villages of Honami and Yomase.

== Education ==
Yamanouchi has three public elementary schools and one public middle school operated by the town government. The town does not have a high school. The closest high school is Nagano Prefectural Nakano Rissikan Senior High School in the neighboring town of Nakano, Nagano near Shinshūnakano Station

- Yamanouchi East Elementary School
- Yamanouchi Junior High School, next to Yudanaka Station
- Yamanouchi Minami Elementary School
- Yamanouchi Nishi Elementary School

== Transportation ==
=== Railway ===
- Nagano Electric Railway - Nagano Line
  - Yomase - Kamijō - Yudanaka

=== Highway Bus ===
- Express buses are available from Nagano Station.

=== Highway ===
- National Route 292
- National Route 403

== Friendship City Relations ==
- Adachi Ward in Tokyo since October 1, 1982
- Tamamura Town in Gunma Prefecture since August 1, 2007
- Miyun Ward in Beijing since April 27, 2007
- Vail in Colorado, USA since January 25, 2018
- Bibai City in Hokkaido since March 22, 2024
- Saint Gervais les Bains in France since January 8, 2025

== Local attractions ==
- Jigokudani Monkey Park
- Ryuuou Ski Park, with the Sky (Sora) Terrace at 1770m.
- Sano ruins, Jōmon period settlement traces, a National Historic Site
- Shibu Onsen, an area of tradition wooden Ryokan (inn), with nine public baths
- Shiga Kōgen, a UNESCO Man and the Biosphere Reserve

== Gallery ==
Yamanouchi, Nagano
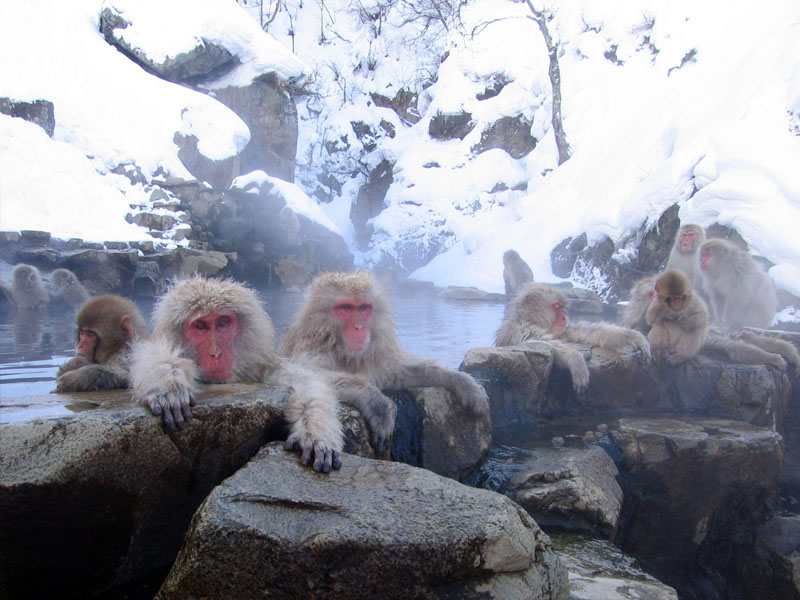
Jigokudani Monkey Park

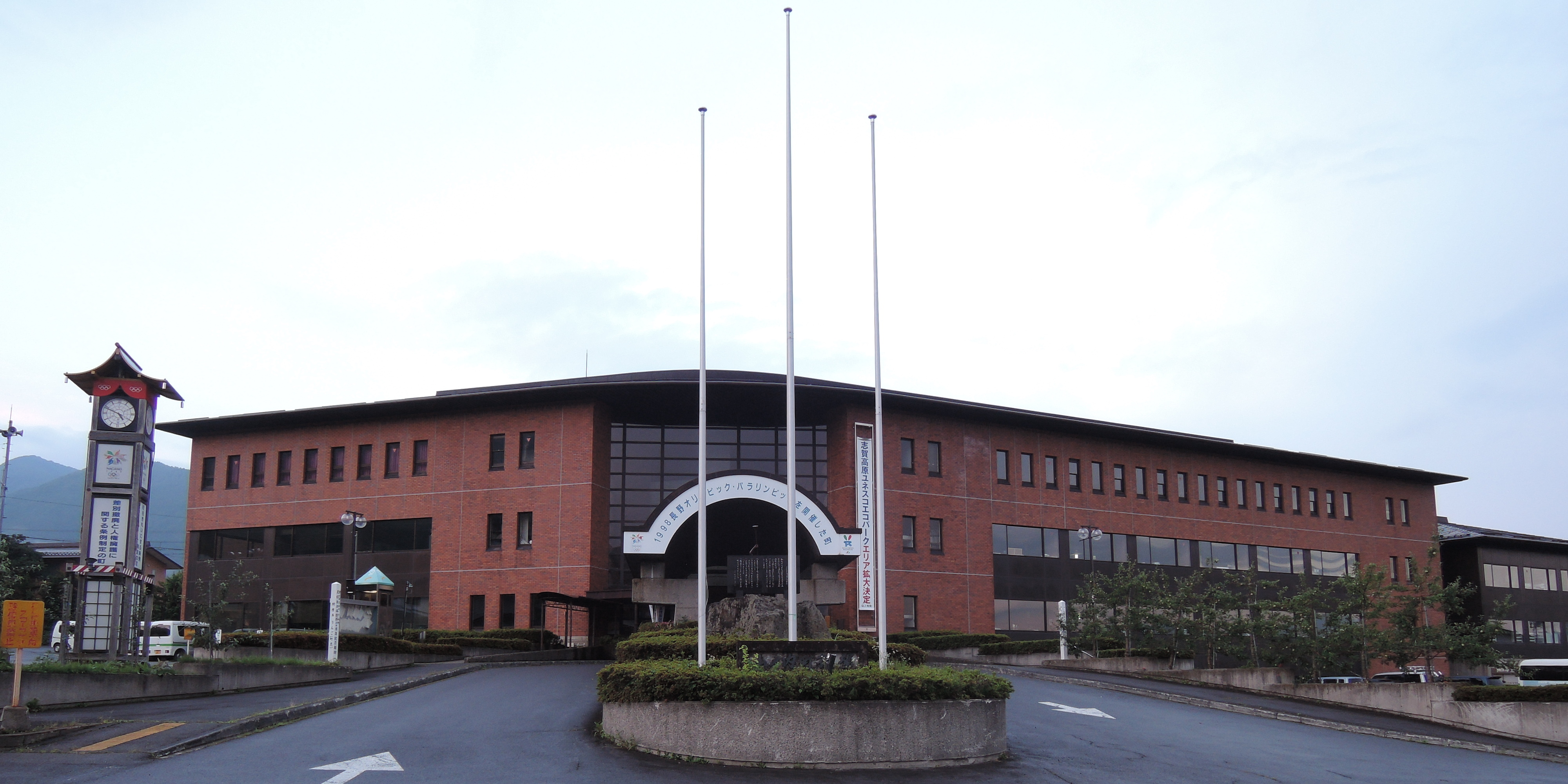
Yamanouchi City Hall

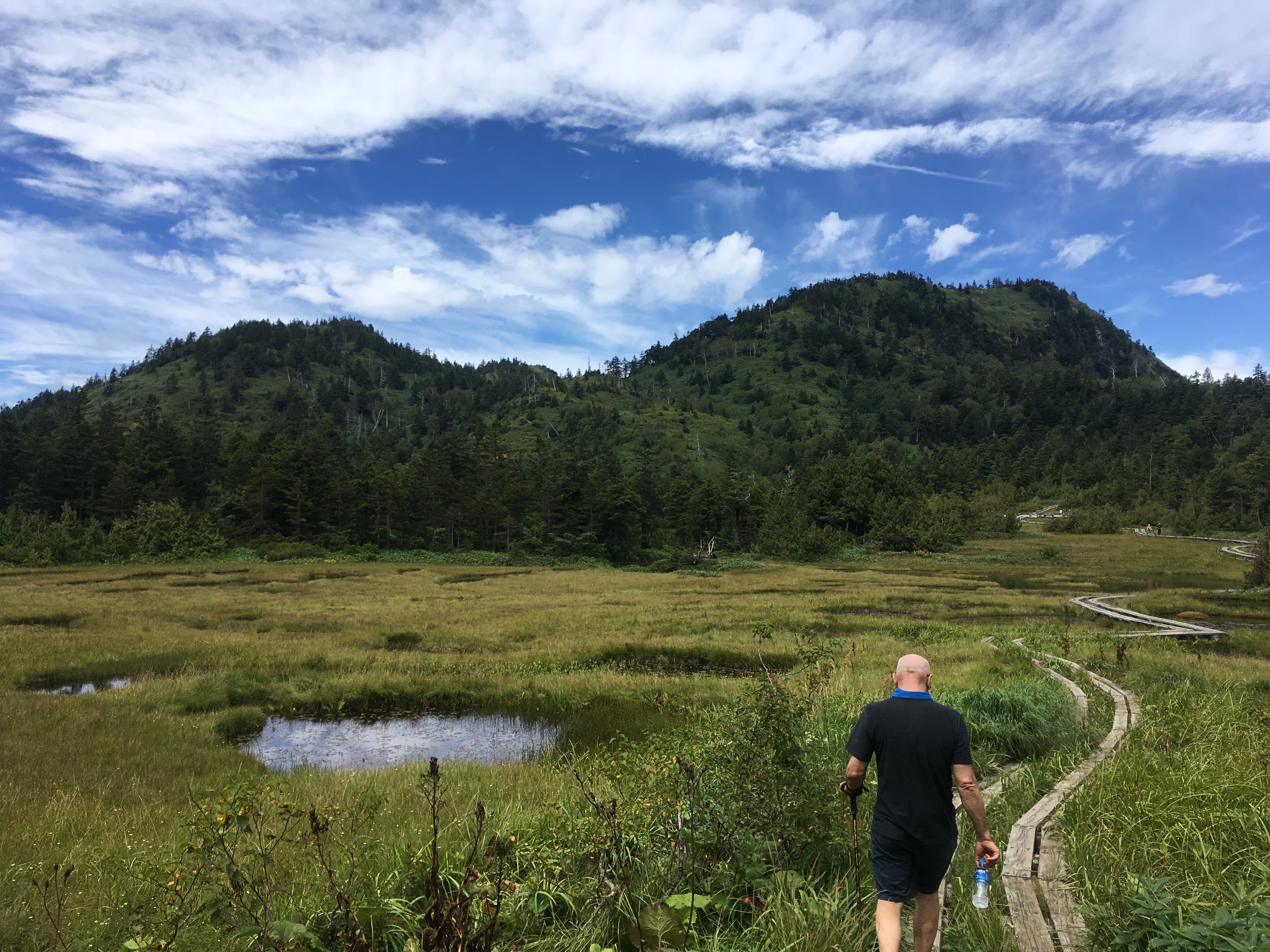
Shijuhachi Pond

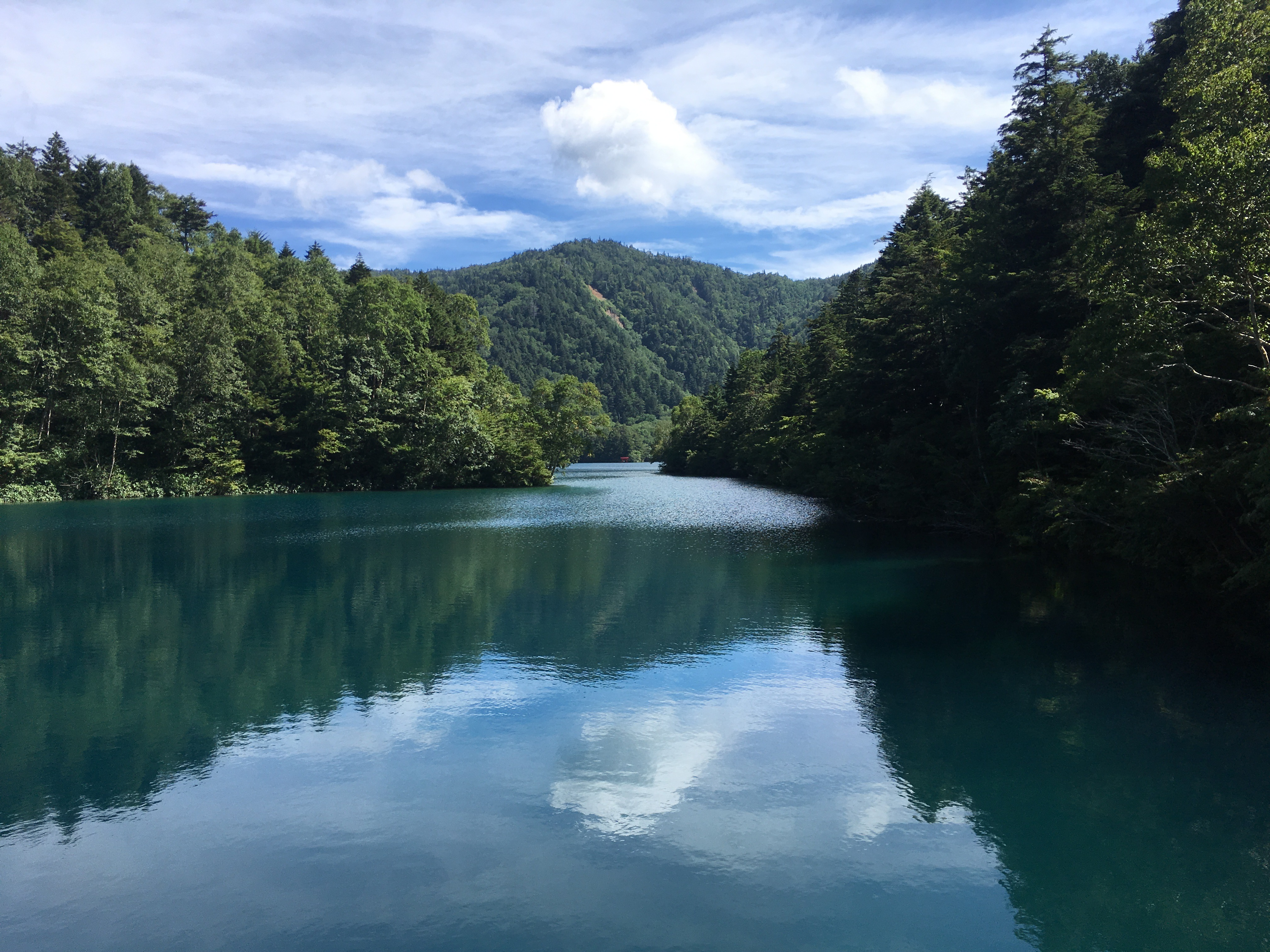
Onuma Pond

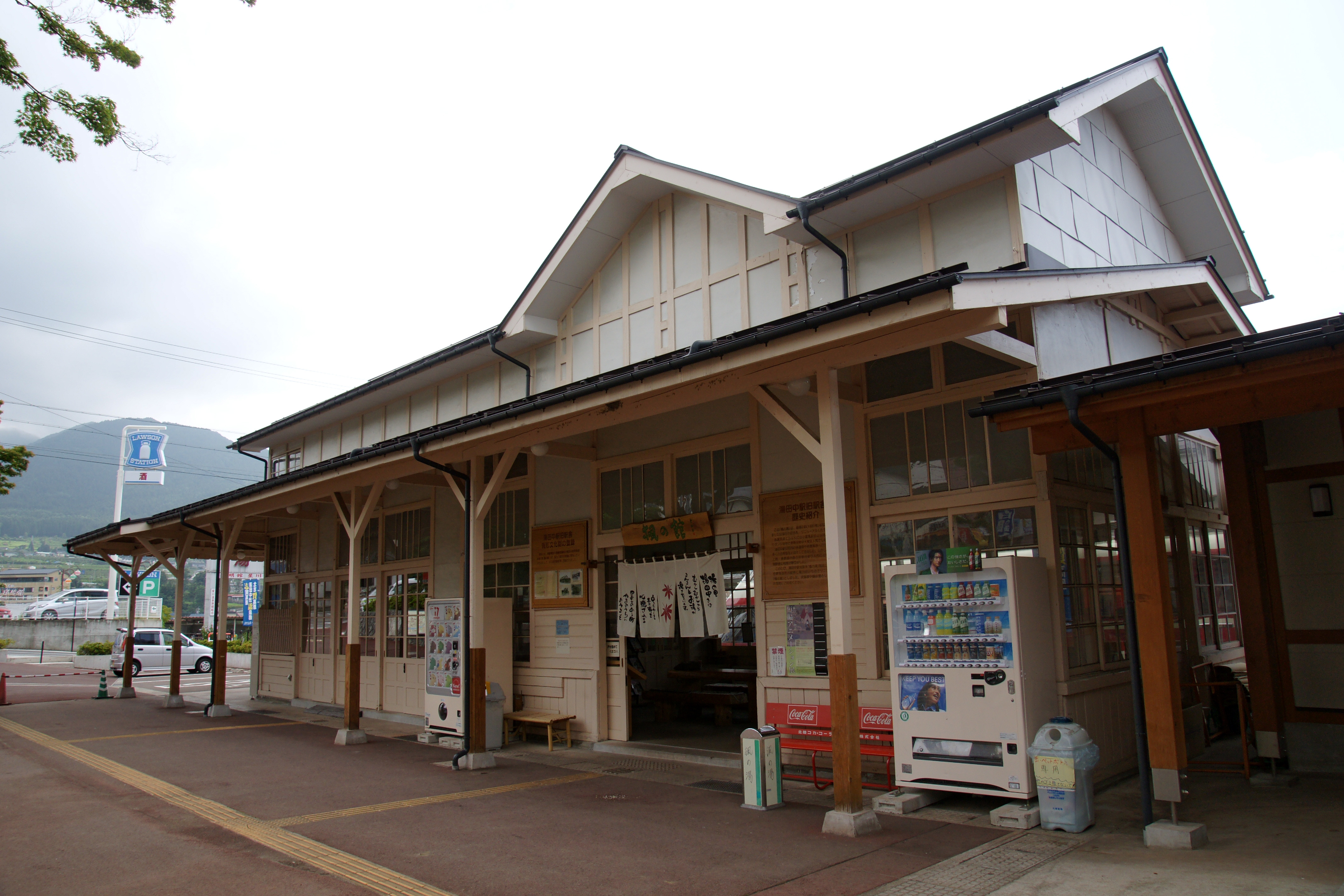
The Former Yudanaka Station, now a hot spring bath

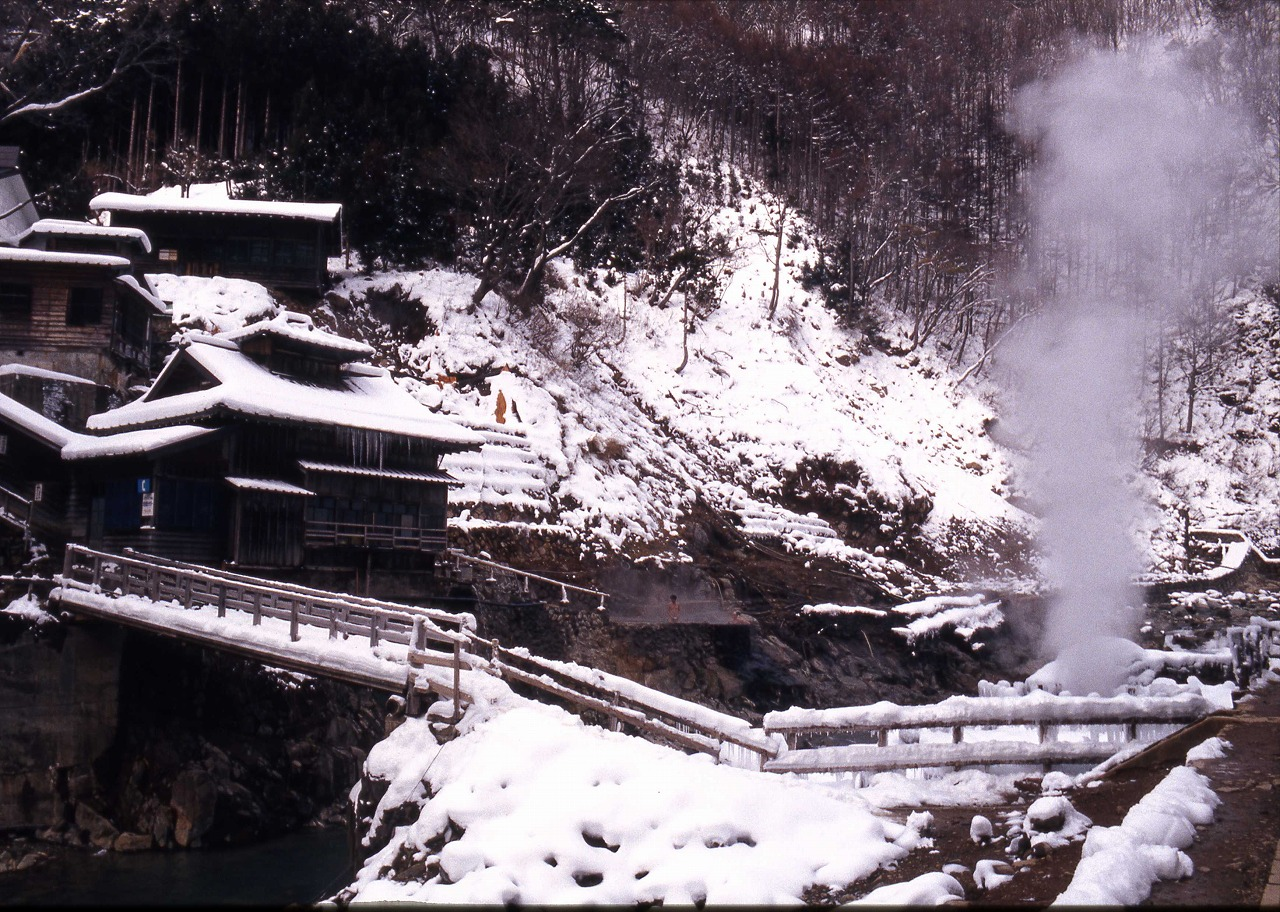
Jigokutani onsen, Korakukukan

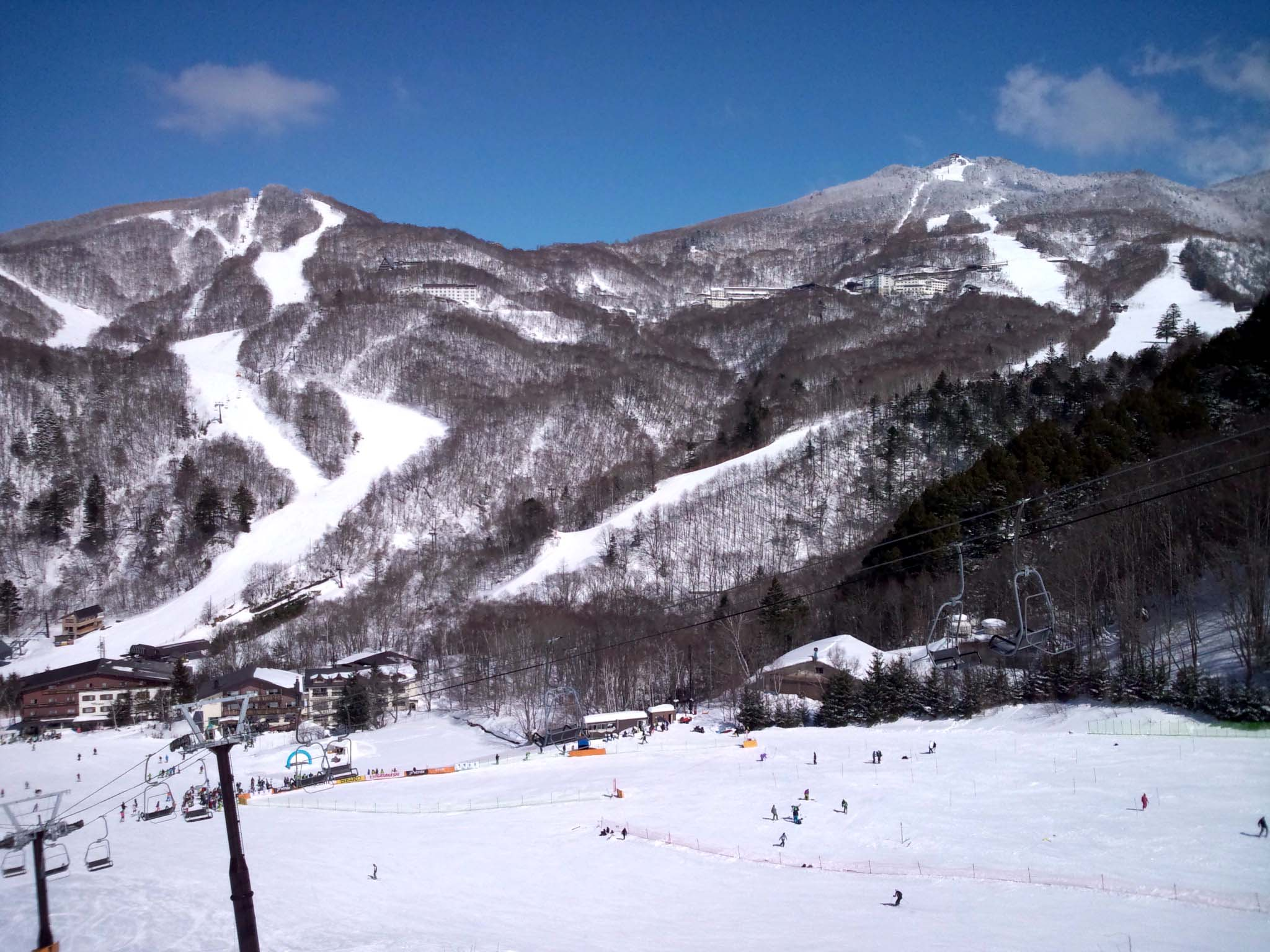
Shiga Kogen Ski resort, Nishitateyama and Higashitateyama
