= Kijimadaira =

Kijimadaira 木島平村
- Village
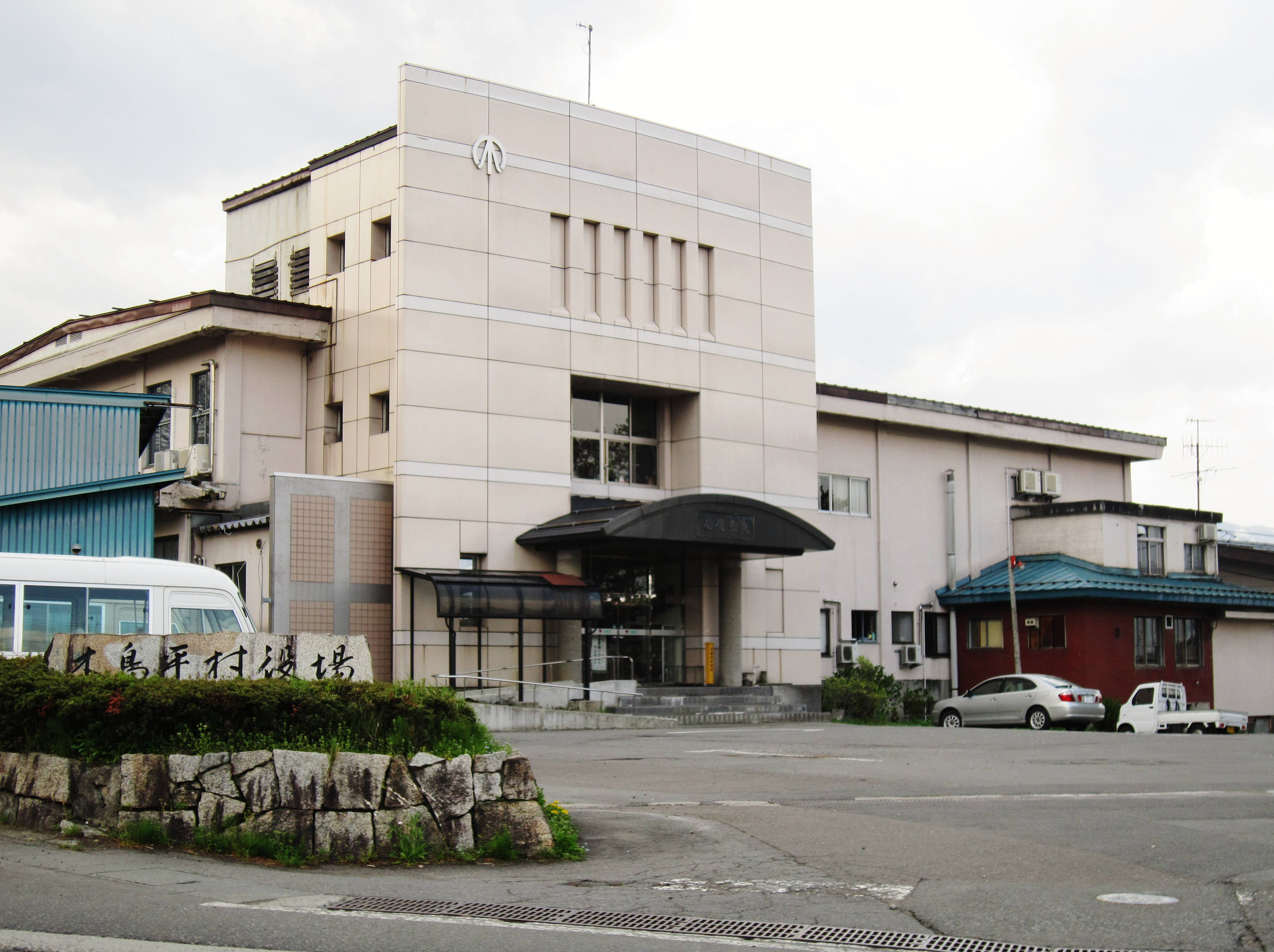
- Kijimadaira Village Hall

- Flag Seal

- Location of Kijimadaira in Nagano Prefecture

- Coordinates: 36°51′30.3″N 138°24′24.1″E
- Country: Japan
- Region: Chūbu (Kōshin'etsu)
- Prefecture: Nagano
- District: Shimotakai

Area
  - Total: 99.32 km^{2} (38.35 sq mi)

Population (October 2018)
  - Total: 4,468
  - Density: 44.99/km^{2} (116.5/sq mi)
- Time zone: UTC+9 (Japan Standard Time)
- Symbols
  - Tree: Zelkova serrata
  - Flower: Adonis amurensis
- Phone number: 026-245-1100
- Address: 973-1 Ogo, Kijimadaira-mura, Shimotakai-gun, Nagano-ken 389-2352
- Website: Official website

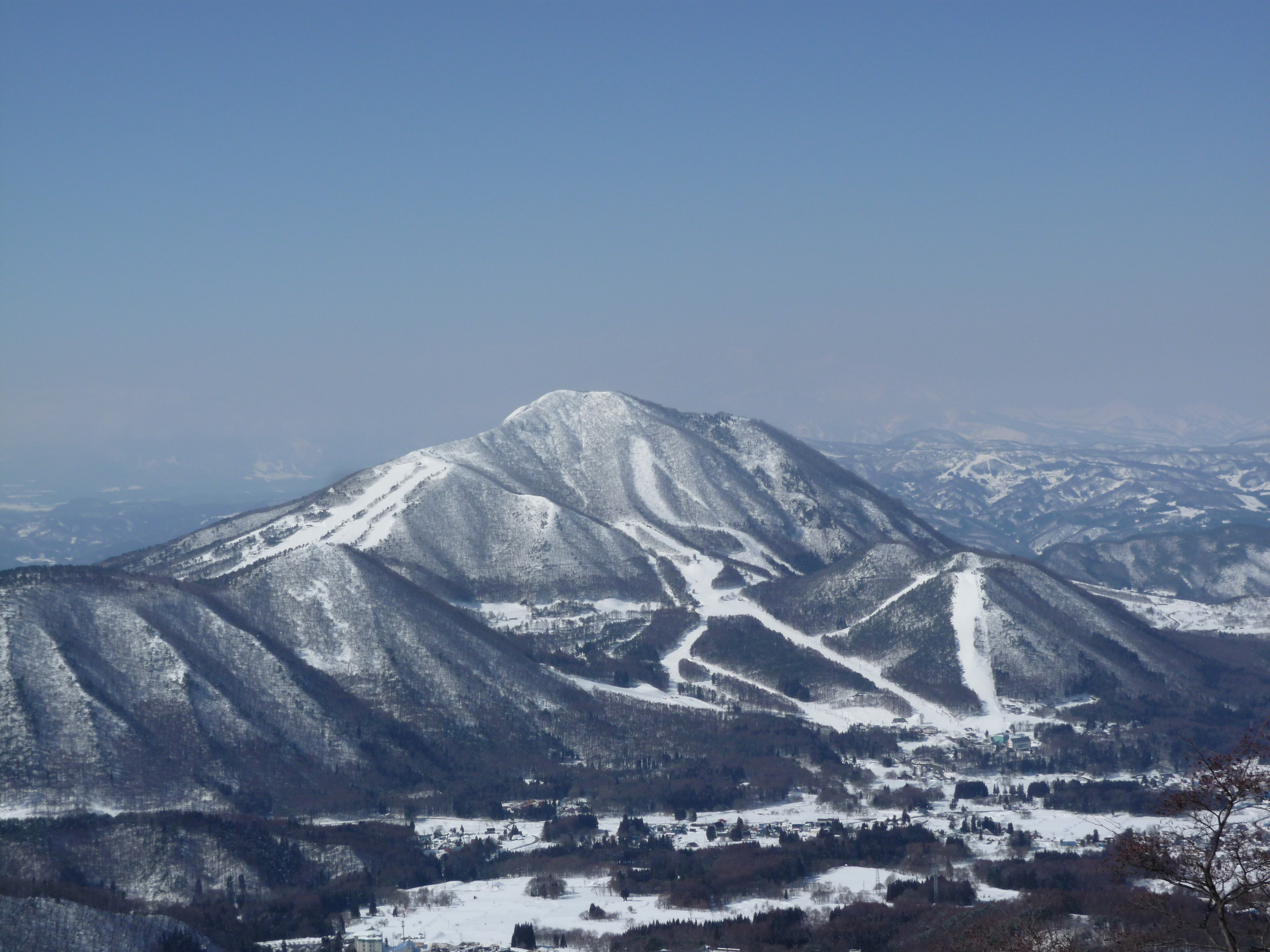
Mount Kosha in Kijimadaira

Kijimadaira (木島平村, Kijimadaira-mura) is a village located in Nagano Prefecture, Japan. As of 1 October 2018, the village had an estimated population of 4,468, and a population density of 45.8 persons per km^{2}. The total area of the village is 99.32 square kilometres (38.35 sq mi).

== Geography ==
Kijimadaira is located in mountainous northeastern Nagano Prefecture.

=== Surrounding municipalities ===
- Nagano Prefecture
  - Iiyama
  - Nakanojō
  - Nozawaonsen
  - Sakae
  - Tsumagoi
  - Yamanouchi

=== Climate ===
The village has a humid continental climate characterized by warm and humid summers, and cold winters with heavy snowfall (Köppen climate classification Dfb). The average annual temperature in Kijimadaira is 7.3 °C. The average annual rainfall is 1570 mm with September as the wettest month. The temperatures are highest on average in August, at around 20.3 °C, and lowest in January, at around -5.1 °C.

== Demographics ==
Per Japanese census data, the population of Kijimadaira has decreased over the past 70 years.

Historical population
Year	Pop.	±%
1940	6,964	—
1950	8,387	+20.4%
1960	7,735	−7.8%
1970	6,470	−16.4%
1980	6,077	−6.1%
1990	5,887	−3.1%
2000	5,513	−6.4%
2010	4,942	−10.4%
2020	4,375	−11.5%

== History ==
The area of present-day Kijimadaira was part of ancient Shinano Province. The modern village of Kijimadaira was established on February 1, 1955 by the merger of the villages of Hotada, Ogo and Kamijijima. A proposal to merge the village with neighboring Iiyama city and Nozawaonsen village was overwhelmingly rejected by local inhabitants in 2004.

== Economy ==
The economy of Kijimadaira is based on agriculture and seasonal tourism.

== Education ==
Kijimadaira has one public elementary school and one public middle school operated by the village government. The village has one public high school operated by the Nagano Prefectural Board of Education.

== Transportation ==
=== Railway ===
- The village has no passenger railway service.

=== Highway ===
- National Route 403
