= Yokokura Station (Nagano) =

Railway station in Sakae, Nagano Prefecture, Japan

Yokokura Station 横倉駅
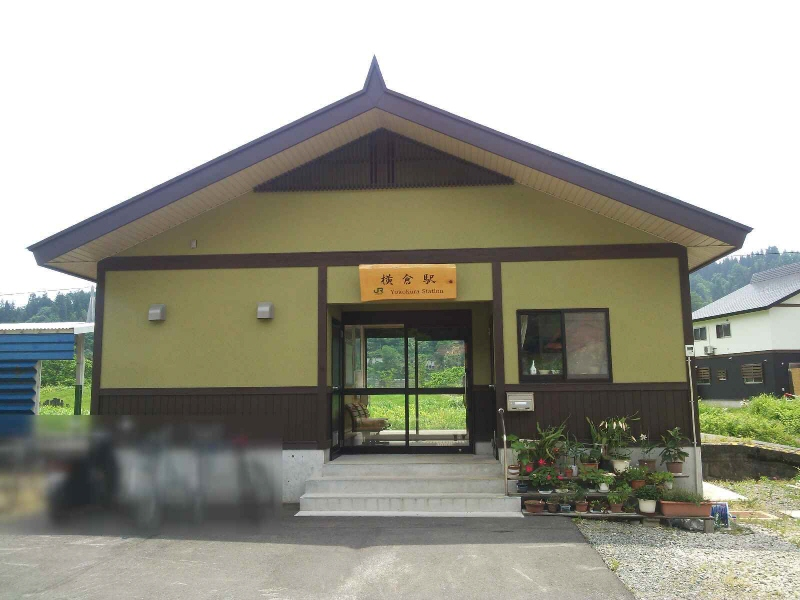
- Yokokura Station, June 2013

General information
- Location: Hokushin, Sakae-mura, Shimominochi-gun, Nagano-ken 389-2702; Japan
- Coordinates: 36°58′48″N 138°33′01″E
- Elevation: 288.3 metres (946 ft)
- Operator: JR East
- Line: ■ Iiyama Line
- Distance: 46.6 kilometres (29.0 mi) from Toyono
- Platforms: 1 side platform
- Tracks: 1

Other information
- Website: Official website

History
- Opened: 19 November 1925

Passengers
- FY2017: 15 (daily)

Services
Preceding station	JR East	Following station
Hirataki towards Nagano	Iiyama Line	Mori-Miyanohara towards Echigo-Kawaguchi
Location
- Location within Nagano Prefecture Location within Japan

Yokokura Station (横倉駅, Yokokura-eki) is a railway station in the Iiyama Line, East Japan Railway Company (JR East), in Hokushin in the village of Sakae, Shimominochi District, Nagano Prefecture, Japan.

== Lines ==
Yokokura Station is served by the Iiyama Line, and is 46.6 kilometers from the starting point of the line at Toyono Station.

== Station layout ==
The station consists of one side platform serving a single bi-directional track. The station originally had an island platform, but was converted when rebuilt following the 2011 Nagano Earthquake. The station is staffed.

== History ==
Yokokura Station opened on 19 November 1925. A new station building was completed in April 2004. With the privatization of Japanese National Railways (JNR) on 1 April 1987, the station came under the control of JR East.

== Passenger statistics ==
In fiscal 2017, the station was used by an average of 15 passengers daily (boarding passengers only).

== Surrounding area ==
- Chikuma River
- Sakae Elementary School
- National Route 117

== See also ==
- List of railway stations in Japan
