= Shimotakai District, Nagano =

District in Nagano Prefecture, Japan

Coordinates: 36.794°N 138.491°E

Shimotakai (下高井郡, Shimotakai-gun) is a district located in Nagano Prefecture, Japan.

As of 2003, the district has an estimated population of 25,179 with a density of 59.50 persons per km^{2}. The total area is 423.19 km^{2}.

== Municipalities ==
The district consists of one town and two villages:

- Kijimadaira (Note: Classified as a village.)
- Nozawaonsen
- Yamanouchi (Note: Classified as a town.)

== History ==
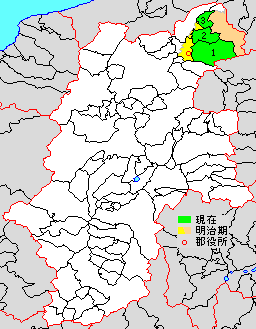
Map showing original extent of Shimotakai District in Nagano Prefecture: * yellow - areas formerly within the district borders during the early Meiji period: 1. Yamanouchi-machi; 2. Kijimadaira-mura; 3. Nozawaonsen-mura

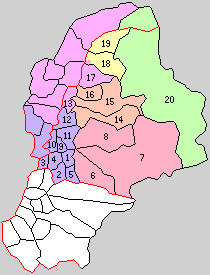
Colored areas are in this district.
