= Jōshin'etsu-kōgen National Park =

National Park in Chūbu, Japan

- 上信越高原国立公園
- IUCN category II (national park)
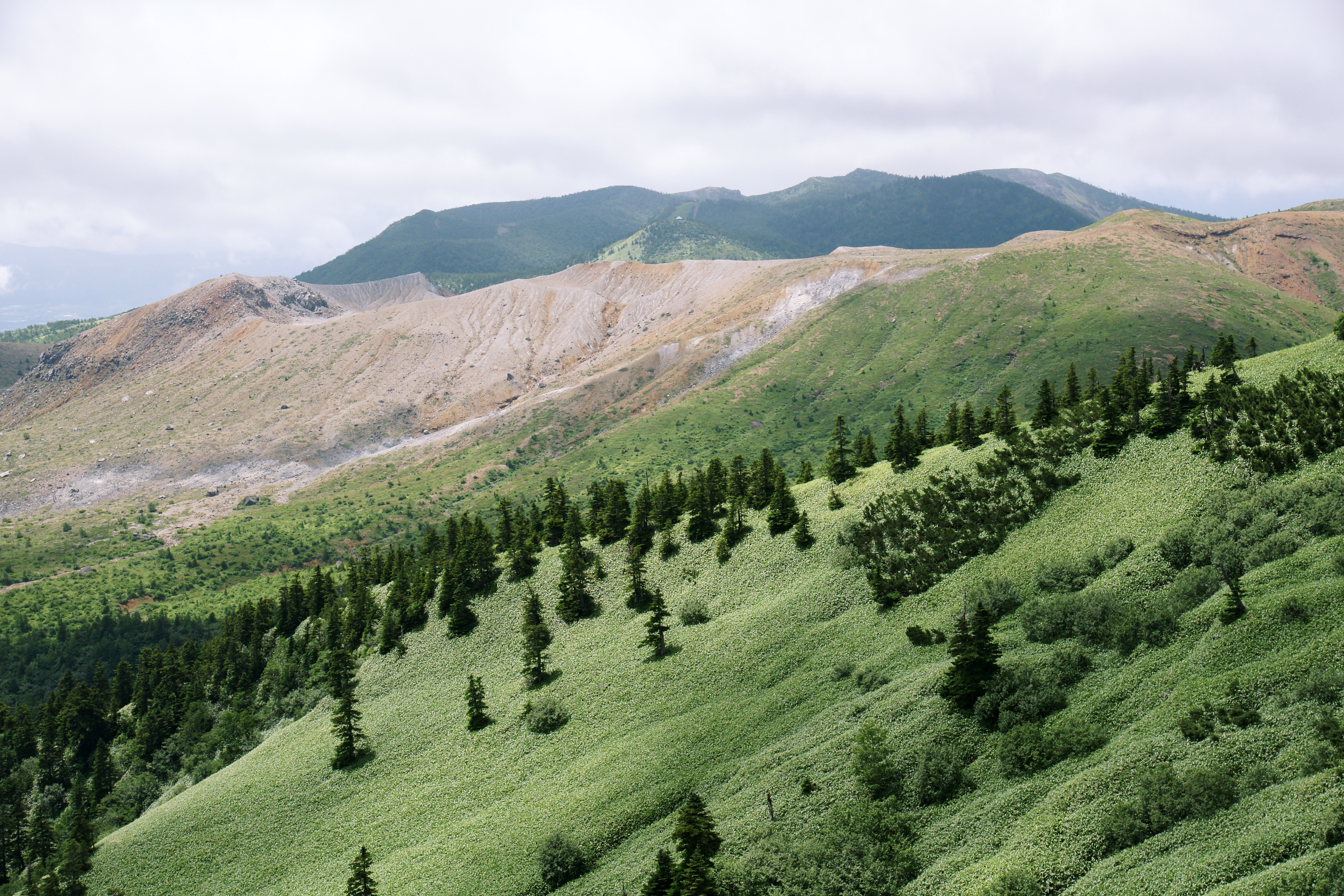
- Mount Kusatsu-Shirane

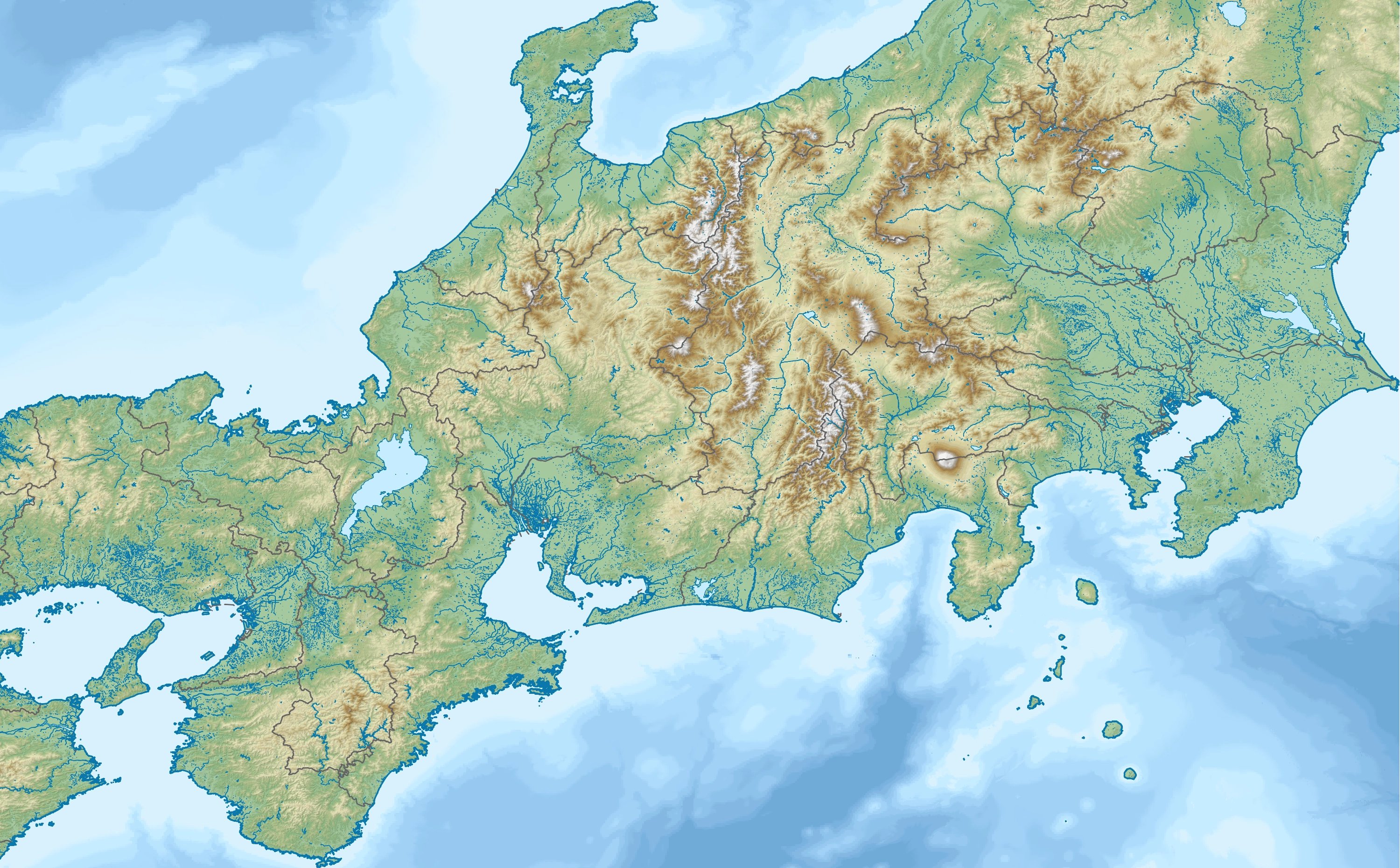
- Location within Central Japan Location within Japan
- Location: Honshū, Japan
- Coordinates: 36°37′30″N 138°37′30″E
- Area: 148,194 hectares (572.18 mi^{2})
- Established: September 7, 1949
- Governing body: Ministry of the Environment (Japan)

Jōshin'etsu-kōgen National Park (上信越高原国立公園, Jōshin'etsu-kōgen Kokuritsu Kōen) is a national park in the Chūbu region of the main island of Honshū, Japan formed around several active and dormant volcanoes. It spans the mountainous areas of Gunma, Nagano, and Niigata prefectures. The name refers to the two mountain ranges that make up the park. It was divided into two separate areas: the Southern Niigata/North Nagano Area and the East Nagano Area.

== History ==
Jōshin'etsu-kōgen National Park was established in 1949 and significantly expanded in 1956 to include the Myōkō-Togakushi mountainous region. The latter was separated as Myōkō-Togakushi Renzan National Park on March 27, 2015 with 39.772 ha.

== Etymology ==
The name of the park consists of two elements. The first, "Jōshin'etsu", is a kanji acronym consisting of three characters which represent the former names of provinces of the area: Kōzuke Province (上野国) in present-day Gunma Prefecture, Shinano Province (信濃国) in present-day Nagano Prefecture, and Echigo Province (越後国) in present-day Niigata Prefecture. The second, "kōgen", means tableland or plateau.

== Southwest Mikuni Mountain Range Area ==
Southwest Mikuni Mountain Range Area (三国山脈南西部, Mikuni Sanmyaku Nanseibu) includes Mount Tanigawa (1,963 metres (6,440 ft)) and two active volcanoes -- Mount Kusatsu-Shirane (2,162 metres (7,093 ft)) and Mount Asama (2,542 metres (8,340 ft)). Mount Asama is the most active volcano on Honshū.

== Recreation ==
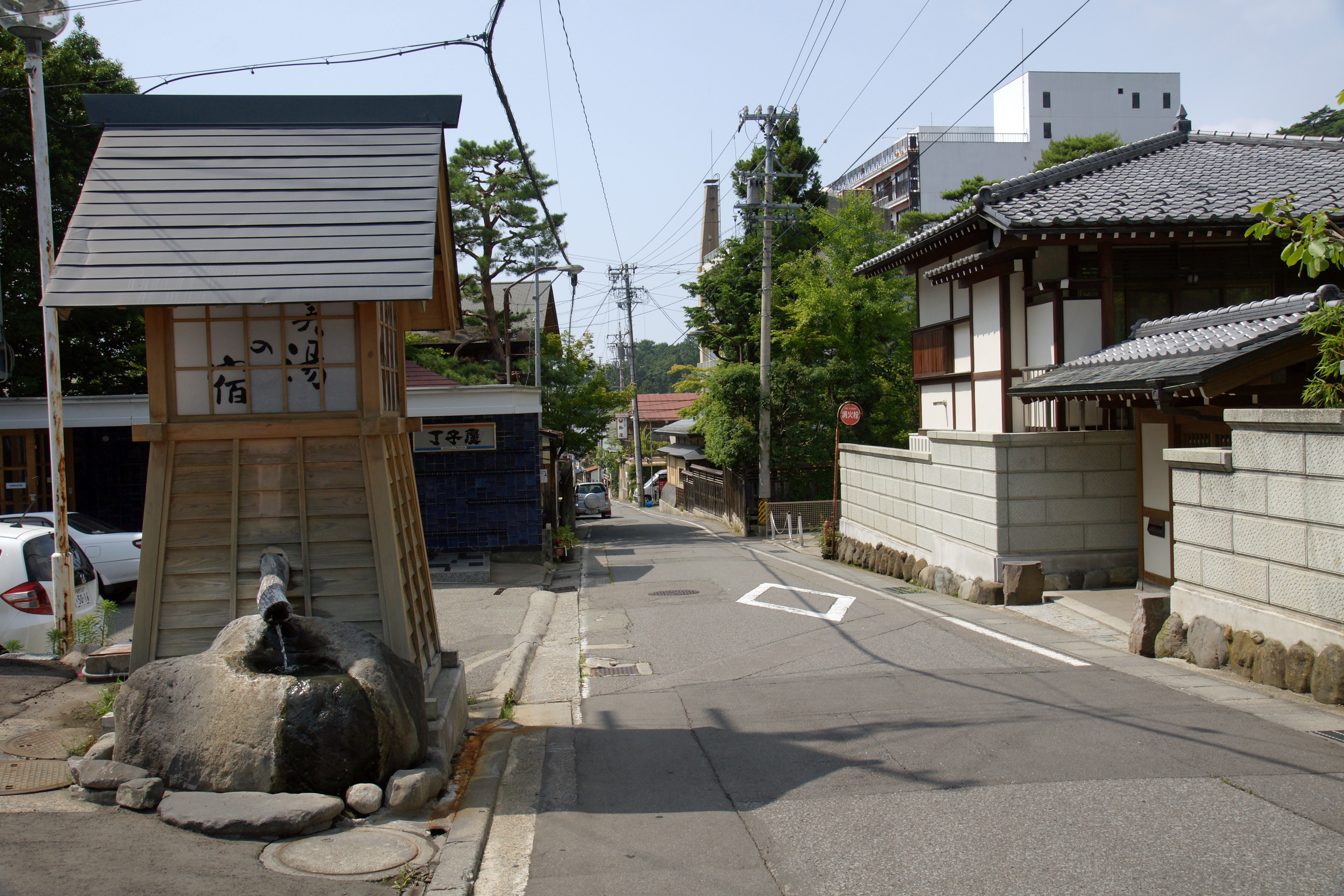
Onsen, Yudanaka, Nagano Prefecture

The Jōshin'etsu Kōgen National Park is a popular tourist destination for skiing, mountain climbing, hiking, and onsen hot spring resorts. The Eastern Area holds the popular skiing areas of Sugadaira and Shiga Kōgen. The Shiga-Kusatsu-Kogen Ridge Highway traverses this section of the park, connecting the Yamanouchi Hot Springs, including the onsens of Yudanaka, in the north with the resort town of Karuizawa, Nagano Prefecture in the south.

Karuizawa can be reached from Tokyo via the JR East Nagano Shinkansen.

== See also ==
- List of national parks of Japan
