= Shimominochi District, Nagano =

District in Nagano prefecture, Japan

Coordinates: 36.890°N 138.574°E

Shimominochi (下水内郡, Shimominochi-gun) is a district located in Nagano Prefecture, Japan.

As of 2003, the district has an estimated population of 7,643 with a density of 24.96 persons per km^{2}. The total area is 306.25 km^{2}.

== Municipalities ==
The district consists of one village:

- Sakae (Note: Classified as a village.)

== History ==
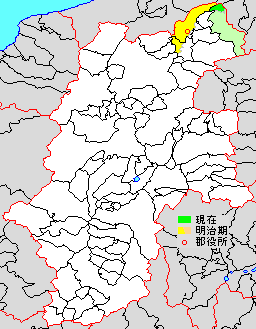
Map showing original extent of Shimominochi District in Nagano Prefecture: * yellow - areas formerly within the district borders during the early Meiji period: 1. Sakae-mura

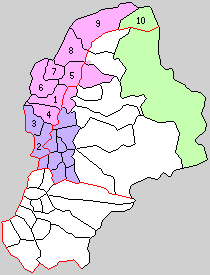
Colored areas are in this district.

=== Recent mergers ===
- On April 1, 2005 - The village of Toyota was merged into the expanded city of Nakano.
