= Uragawara Station =

Railway station in Jōetsu, Niigata Prefecture, Japan

Uragawara Station うらがわら駅
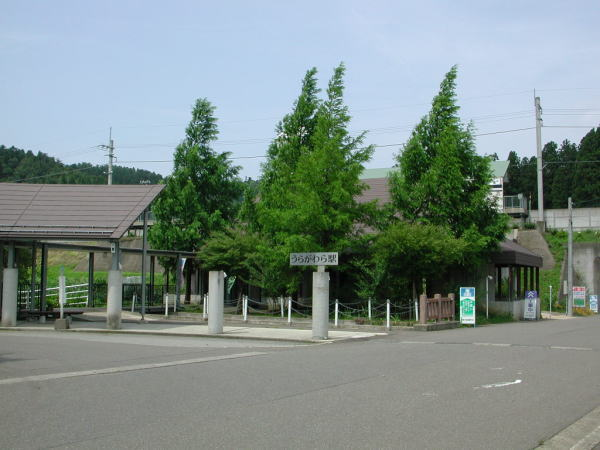
- Uragawa Station in July 2004

General information
- Location: 631-2 Kenshōji, Uragawa-ku, Jōetsu-shi, Niigata-ken 942-0314; Japan
- Coordinates: 37.1590°N 138.4190°E
- Operator: Hokuetsu Express
- Line: ■ Hokuhoku Line
- Distance: 46.8 km from Muikamachi
- Platforms: 1 side platform
- Tracks: 1

Other information
- Status: Unstaffed
- Website: Official website

History
- Opened: 22 March 1997; 29 years ago

Passengers
- FY2015: 106 daily
Location
- Location within Hokuhoku Line Location within Japan

Uragawara Station (うらがわら駅, Uragawara-eki) is a railway station located in the city of Jōetsu, Niigata, Japan.

== Lines ==
Uragawa Station is served by the Hokuetsu Express Hokuhoku Line and is 46.8 kilometers from the terminus of the line at Muikamachi.

== Station layout ==
The station has one side platform serving a single bi-directional track. The station is unattended.

■ Hokuhoku Line	for Echigo-Yuzawa, Muikamachi, Tōkamachi, Saigata and Naoetsu (bidirectional)

== Adjacent stations ==
«	Service	»
Hokuhoku Line
Mushigawa-Ōsugi	Local	Ōike-Ikoi-no-mori

== History ==
The station opened on 22 March 1997 with the opening of the Hokuhoku Line.

== Passenger statistics ==
In fiscal 2015, the station was used by an average of 155 passengers daily (boarding passengers only).

== Surroundings area ==
- former Uragawara village hall
