= Hokuhoku-Ōshima Station =

Railway station in Jōetsu, Niigata Prefecture, Japan

Hokuhoku-Ōshima Station ほくほく大島駅
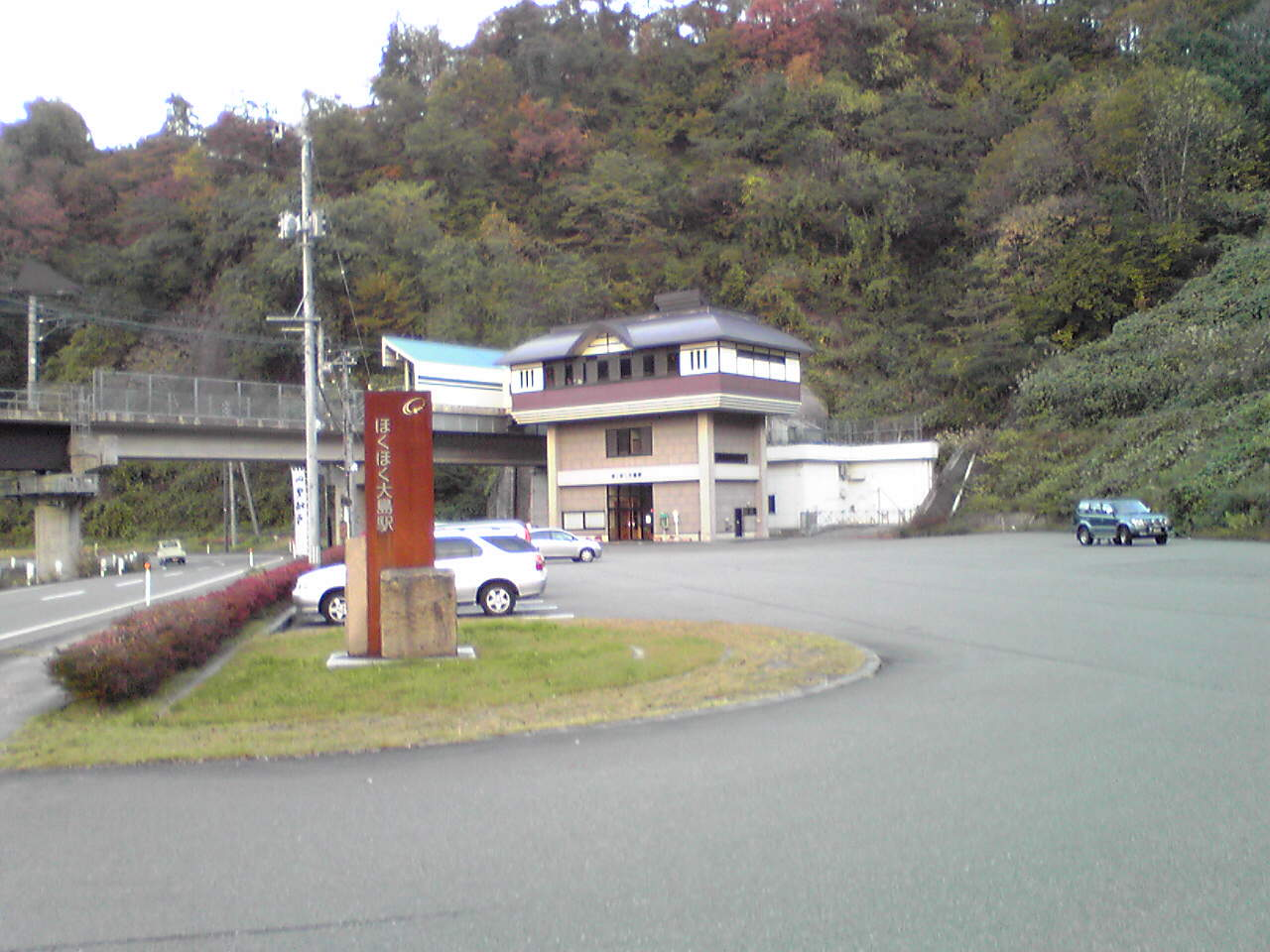
- Hokuhoku-Ōshima Station in November 2007

General information
- Location: 269-2 Shimotate, Ōshima-ku, Jōetsu-shi, Niigata-ken 942-1104; Japan
- Coordinates: 37.1469°N 138.5095°E
- Operator: Hokuetsu Express
- Line: ■ Hokuhoku Line
- Distance: 38.6 km from Muikamachi
- Platforms: 1 side platform
- Tracks: 1

Other information
- Status: Unstaffed
- Website: Official website

History
- Opened: 22 March 1997; 29 years ago

Passengers
- FY2016: 68 daily
Location
- Location within Hokuhoku Line Location within Japan

Hokuhoku-Ōshima Station (ほくほく大島駅, Hokuhoku-Ōshima-eki) is a railway station in the city of Jōetsu, Niigata, Japan operated by the third-sector operator Hokuetsu Express.

== Lines ==
Hokuhoku-Ōshima Station is served by the Hokuhoku Line and is 38.6 kilometers from the terminus of the line at Muikamachi.

== Station layout ==
The station is located on a bridge between two tunnel portals, and has one elevated side platform with the station building underneath. The station is unattended.

=== Platforms ===
■ Hokuhoku Line	for Echigo-Yuzawa, Muikamachi, Tōkamachi, Saigata and Naoetsu (bidirectional)

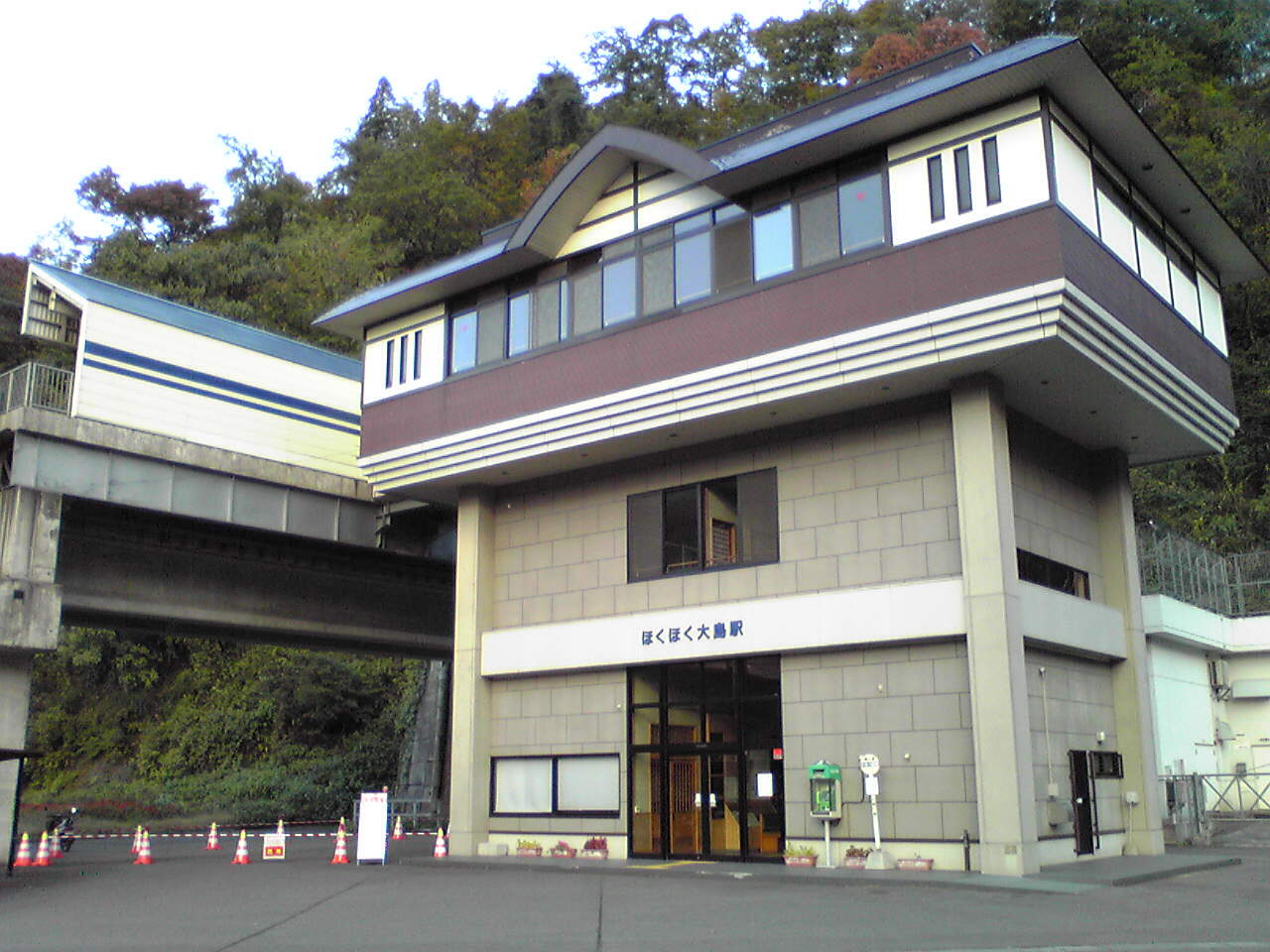
Station building

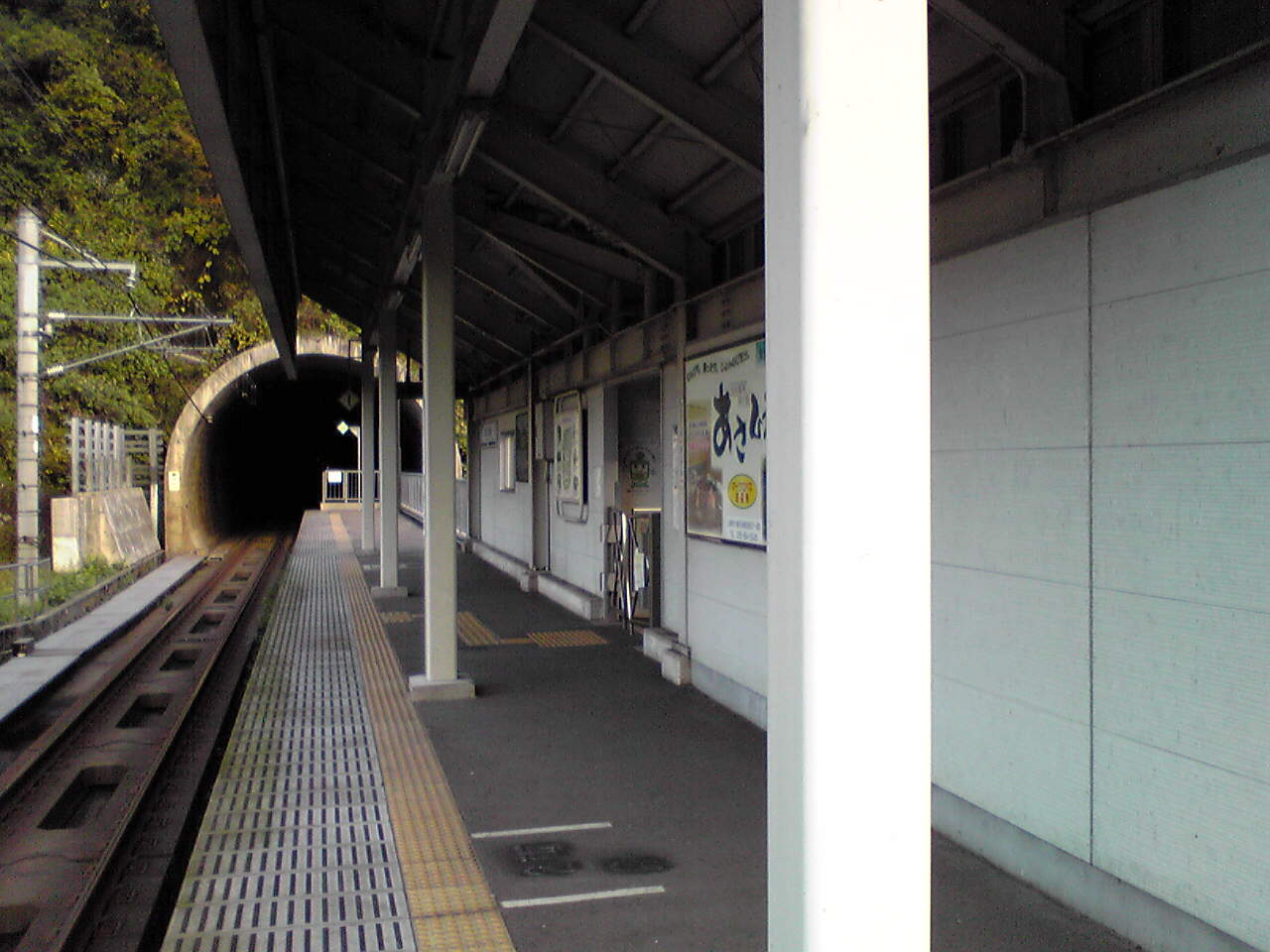
Platform

== Adjacent stations ==
«	Service	»
Hokuhoku Line
Matsudai	Local	Mushigawa-Ōsugi

== History ==
The station opened on 22 March 1997 with the opening of the Hokuhoku Line.

== Passenger statistics ==
In fiscal 2017, the station was used by an average of 68 passengers daily (boarding passengers only).

== Surroundings area ==
- former Oshima village hall
