= Matsudai Station =

Railway station in Tōkamachi, Niigata Prefecture, Japan

Matsudai Station まつだい駅
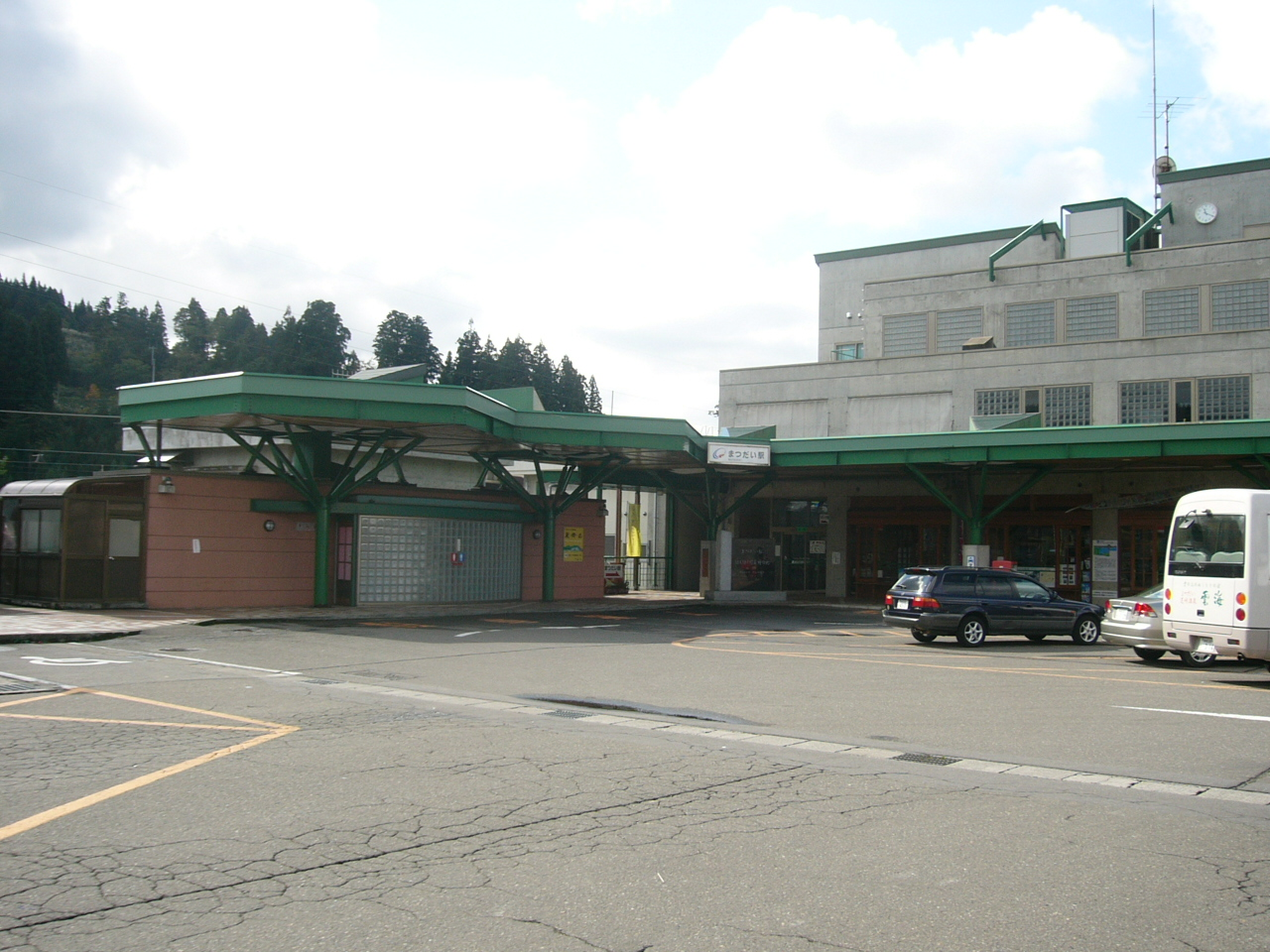
- Matsudai Station in October 2006

General information
- Location: 3701-2 Matsudai, Tōkamachi-shi, Niigata-ken 942-1526; Japan
- Coordinates: 37.1322°N 138.6137°E
- Operator: Hokuetsu Express
- Line: ■Hokuhoku Line
- Distance: 29.2 km from Muikamachi
- Platforms: 2 side platforms
- Tracks: 2

Other information
- Status: Staffed
- Website: Official website

History
- Opened: 22 March 1997; 29 years ago

Passengers
- FY2015: 233 daily
Location
- Location within Hokuhoku Line Location within Japan

Matsudai Station (まつだい駅, Matsudai-eki) is a railway station located in the city of Tōkamachi, Niigata, Japan, operated by the third sector Hokuetsu Express. The station name is written in hiragana because when it was opened, there was already a Matsushiro Station (Japanese: 松代, same as the kanji form of Matsudai), which has since closed. Also, it is to appear friendlier to the local community.

== Lines ==
Matsudai Station is a station on the Hokuhoku Line, and is located 29.2 kilometers from the starting point of the line at Muikamachi.

== Station layout ==
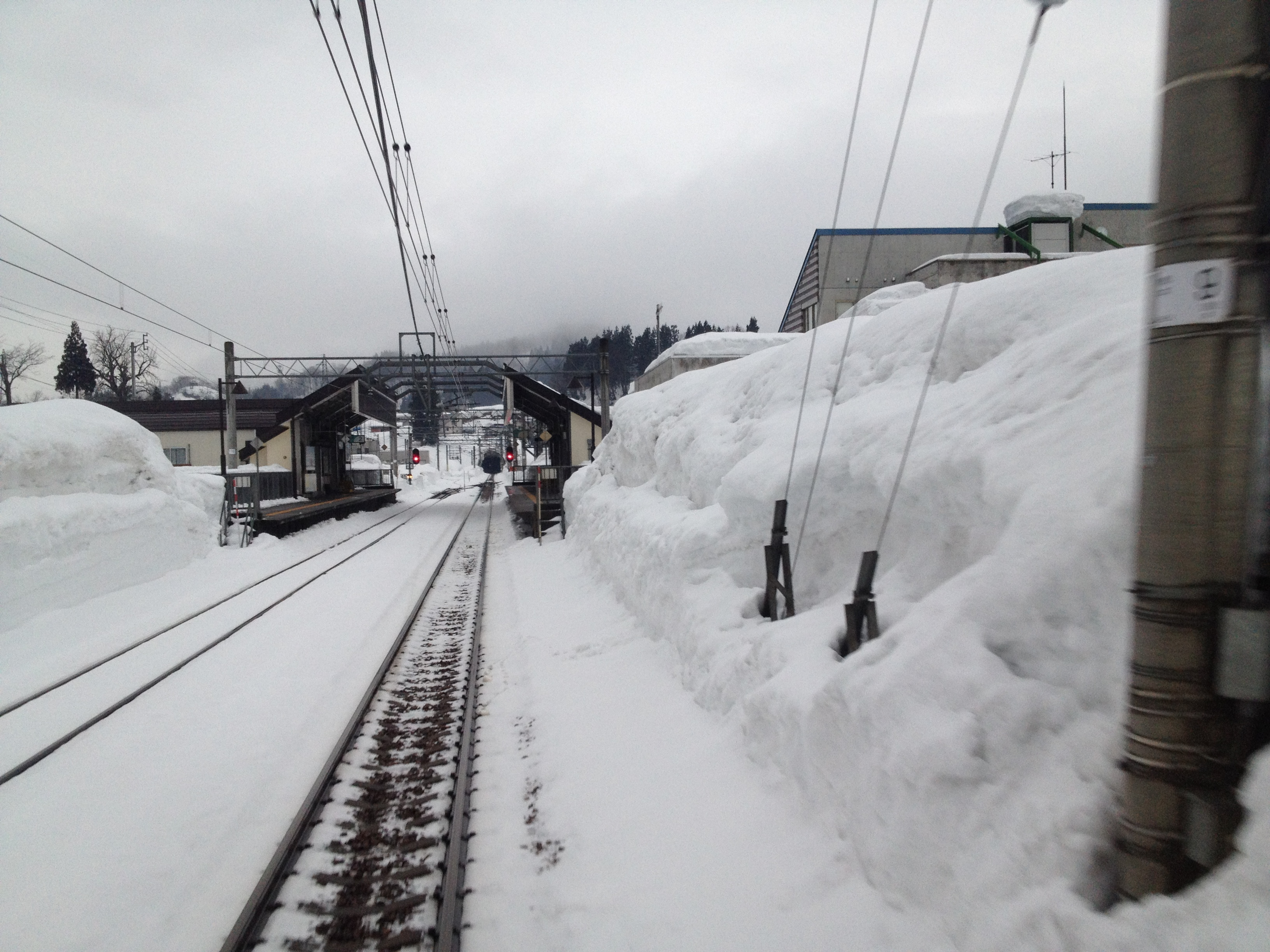
The platforms in February 2012

The station has two ground-level opposed side platforms serving two tracks, connected to the station building by an underground passage. The station is staffed.

=== Platforms ===
1	■ Hokuhoku Line	for Echigo-Yuzawa, Muikamachi and Tōkamachi
2	■ Hokuhoku Line	for Saigata and Naoetsu

== Adjacent stations ==
«	Service	»
Hokuhoku Line
Tōkamachi	Local	Hokuhoku-Ōshima

== History ==
The station opened on 22 March 1997, coinciding with the opening of the Hokuhoku Line.

== Surrounding area ==
- former Matsudai town hall
- Matsudai Post Office
- National Route 253

== See also ==
- List of railway stations in Japan
