= Kubiki Station =

Railway station in Jōetsu, Niigata Prefecture, Japan

Kubiki Station くびき駅
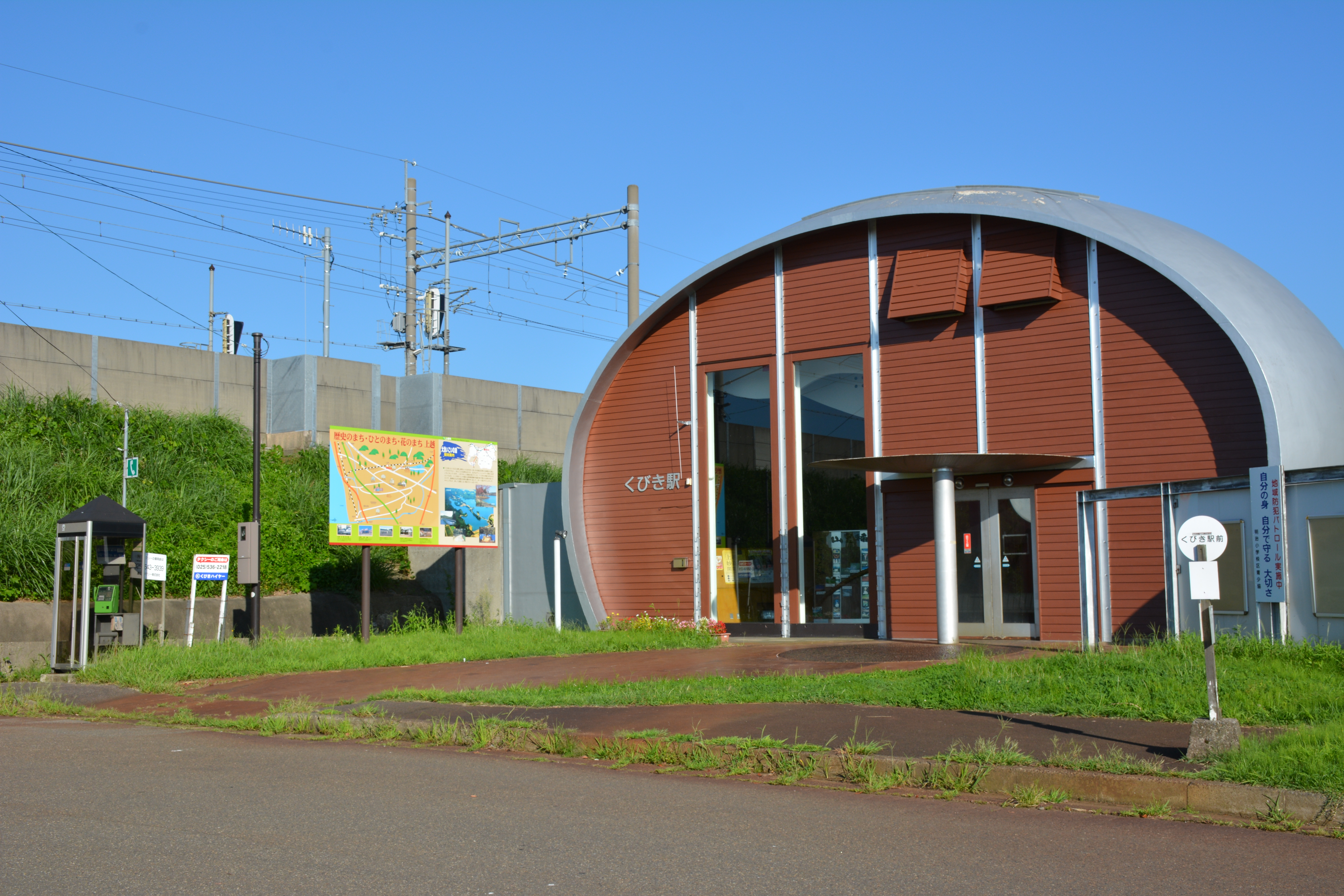
- Kubiki Station in 2014

General information
- Location: 1021-2 Teshima, Kubiki-ku, Jōetsu-shi, Niigata-ken 942-0207; Japan
- Coordinates: 37.1983°N 138.3619°E
- Operator: Hokuetsu Express
- Line: ■ Hokuhoku Line
- Distance: 53.6 km from Muikamachi
- Platforms: 2 side platforms
- Tracks: 2

Other information
- Status: Unstaffed
- Website: Official website

History
- Opened: 22 March 1997; 29 years ago

Passengers
- FY2015: 85 daily
Location
- Location within Hokuhoku Line Location within Japan

Kubiki Station (くびき駅, Kubiki-eki) is a railway station on the Hokuetsu Express Hokuhoku Line in the city of Jōetsu, Niigata, Japan.

== Lines ==
Kubiki Station is served by the Hokuetsu Express Hokuhoku Line and is 53.6 kilometers from the starting point of the line at Muikamachi.

== Station layout ==
The station has two elevated opposed side platforms connected to a dome-shaped station building underneath. The station is unattended.

=== Platforms ===
1	■ Hokuhoku Line	for Echigo-Yuzawa, Muikamachi, Tōkamachi, Saigata, and Naoetsu (bidirectional)
2	■ Hokuhoku Line	-

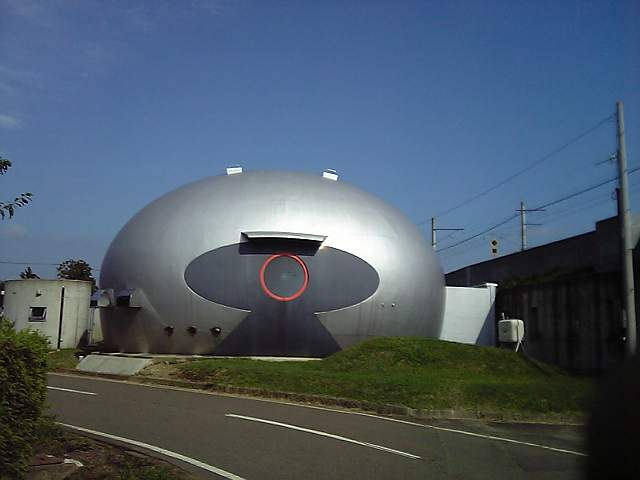
Rear view of Kubiki Station

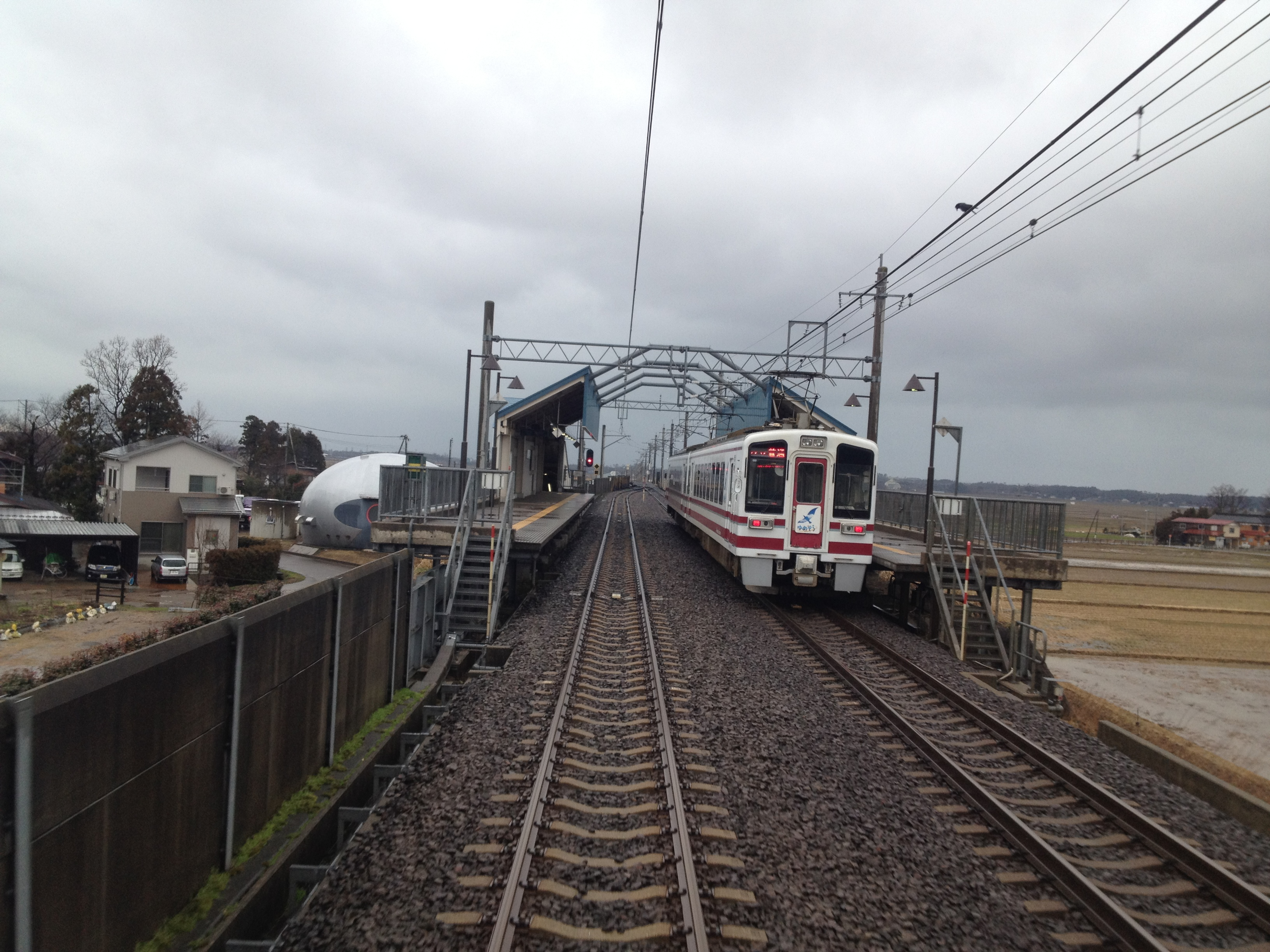
The platforms in March 2012

== Adjacent stations ==
«	Service	»
Hokuhoku Line
Ōike-Ikoi-no-mori	Local	Saigata

== History ==
The station opened on 22 March 1997 with the opening of the Hokuhoku Line.

== Passenger statistics ==
In fiscal 2015, the station was used by an average of 85 passengers daily (boarding passengers only).

== Surrounding area ==
- Hakusan Jinja

== See also ==
- List of railway stations in Japan
