= Kirigatake Tunnel =

Railway tunnel in Honshu, Japan

Kirigatake Railway Tunnel
- Kirigatake tunnel on Hokuhoku Line
- Interactive map of Kirigatake Railway Tunnel

Overview
- Line: Hokuhoku Line
- Location: between Hokuhoku-Ōshima Station and Mushigawa-Ōsugi Station, Jōetsu, Niigata
- Coordinates: 37°9′3.9738″N 138°28′39.4818″E
- Status: active

Operation
- Opened: 1997
- Operator: Hokuetsu Express
- Traffic: Railway
- Character: Passenger and Freight

Technical
- Line length: 3,727 m (12,228 ft)
- No. of tracks: 2
- Track gauge: 1,067 mm (3 ft 6 in)

Kirigatake Tunnel (霧ヶ岳トンネル, Kirigatake tonneru) is a tunnel on Hokuhoku Line that runs through Yakushi mountains from Hokuhoku-Ōshima Station, Joetsu city to Uragawaraku Mushigawa town, Joetsu city, Niigata prefecture with total length of 3.727 km. It was built and completed in 1997.

== See also ==
- List of tunnels in Japan
- Seikan Tunnel undersea tunnel between Honshu-Hokkaido islands
- Kanmon Railway Tunnel undersea tunnel between Honshu-Kyushu islands
- Sakhalin–Hokkaido Tunnel
- Bohai Strait tunnel
