= Mushigawa-Ōsugi Station =

Railway station in Jōetsu, Niigata Prefecture, Japan

Mushikawa-Ōsugi Station 虫川大杉駅
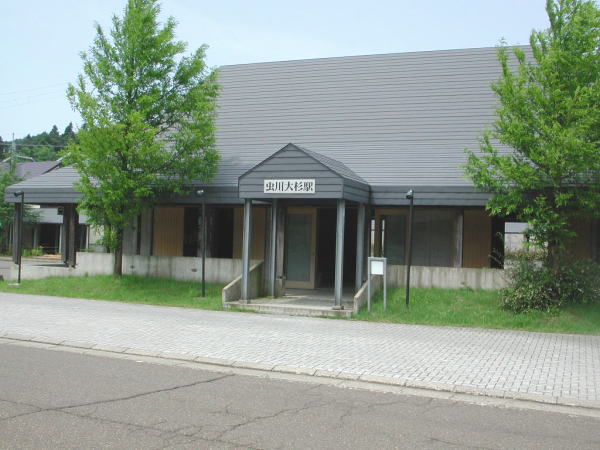
- Mushikawa-Ōsugi Station in July 2004

General information
- Location: 2033-2 Mushigawa, Uragawara-ku, Jōetsu-shi, Niigata-ken 942-0305; Japan
- Coordinates: 37.1551°N 138.4412°E
- Operator: Hokuetsu Express
- Line: ■ Hokuhoku Line
- Distance: 44.8 km from Muikamachi
- Platforms: 2 side platforms
- Tracks: 2

Other information
- Status: Unstaffed
- Website: Official website

History
- Opened: 22 March 1997; 29 years ago

Passengers
- FY2016: 155 daily
Location
- Location within Hokuhoku Line Location within Japan

Mushigawa-Ōsugi Station (虫川大杉駅, Mushigawa-Ōsugi-eki) is a railway station located in the city of Jōetsu, Niigata, Japan operated by the third-sector operator Hokuetsu Express.

== Lines ==
Mushigawa-Ōsugi Station is served by the Hokuhoku Line and is 44.8 kilometers from the terminus of the line at Muikamachi.

== Station layout ==
The station has two elevated opposed side platforms with the station building underneath. The station is unattended.

=== Platforms ===
1	■ Hokuetsu Express Hokuhoku Line	for Tōkamachi and Muikamachi
2	■ Hokuetsu Express Hokuhoku Line	for Naoetsu

== Adjacent stations ==
«	Service	»
Hokuhoku Line
Hokuhoku-Ōshima	Local	Uragawara

== History ==
The station opened on 22 March 1997 with the opening of the Hokuhoku Line.

== Passenger statistics ==
In fiscal 2016, the station was used by an average of 155 passengers daily (boarding passengers only).

== Surroundings area ==
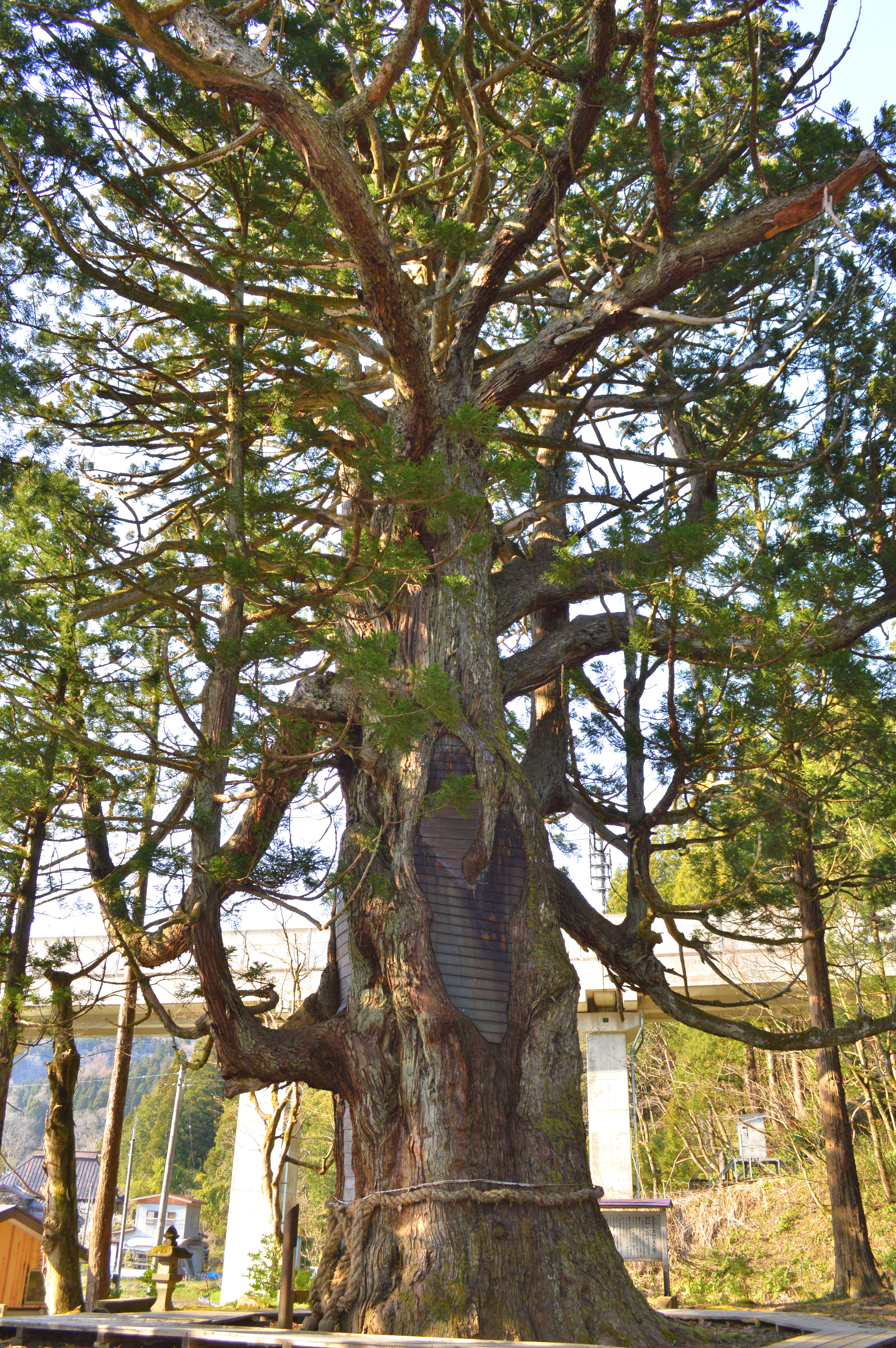
The station is named for a cedar tree at Hakusan Shrine

- Hakusan Shrine
- Yasuzuka High School
