= Dosokohama Station =

Railway station in Jōetsu, Niigata Prefecture, Japan

Dosokohama Station 土底浜駅
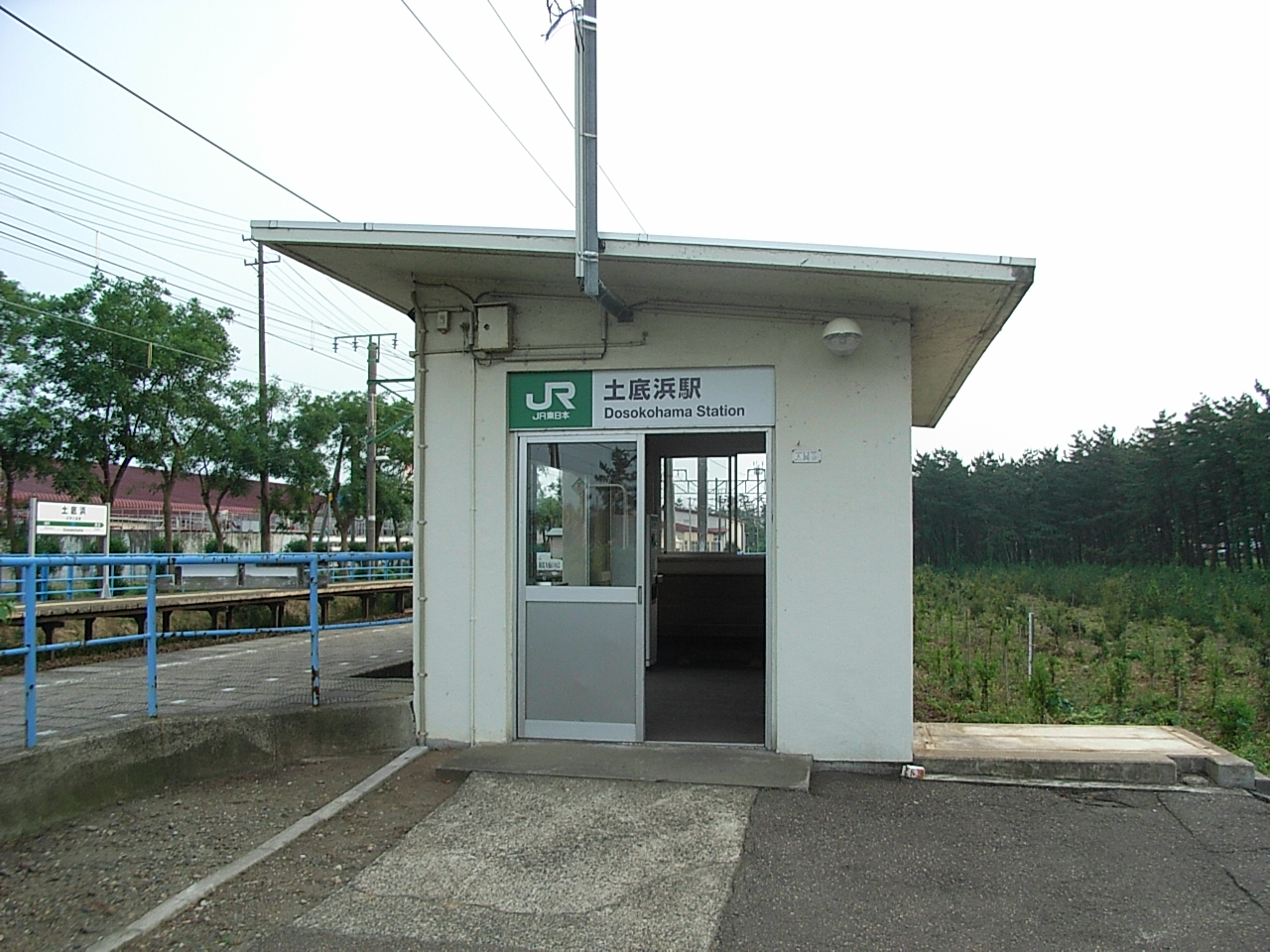
- Dosokohama Station in June 2009

General information
- Location: Dosokohama, Ogata-ku, Jōetsu-shi, Niigata-ken 949-3112; Japan
- Coordinates: 37.2230°N 138.3246°E
- Operator: JR East
- Line: ■ Shin'etsu Main Line
- Platforms: 2 side platforms
- Tracks: 2

Other information
- Status: Unstaffed
- Website: Official website

History
- Opened: 15 March 1960; 66 years ago

Services
Preceding station	JR East	Following station
Saigata towards Naoetsu	Shin'etsu Main Line Local	Katamachi (Jōetsu) towards Niigata
Location
- Location within JR Shinetsu Main Line Location within Japan

Dosokohama Station (土底浜駅, Dosokohama-eki) is a railway station on the Shinetsu Main Line in the city of Jōetsu, Niigata, Japan, operated by the East Japan Railway Company (JR East).

== Lines ==
Dosokohama Station is served by the Shin'etsu Main Line, and is 9.4 kilometers from the terminus of the line at Naoetsu Station.

== Station layout ==
The station consists of two opposed side platforms, with no direct connection between them. Passengers wishing to change platforms must leave the station and walk to the nearest road crossing. The station is unattended.

=== Platforms ===
1	■ Shin'etsu Main Line	for Nagaoka and Niigata
2	■ Shin'etsu Main Line	for Naoetsu

== History ==
The station opened on 15 March 1960. With the privatization of Japanese National Railways (JNR) on 1 April 1987, the station came under the control of JR East.

== Surrounding area ==
- former Ogata town hall
- Ogata Middle School

== See also ==
- List of railway stations in Japan
