= Shinza Station =

Railway station in Tōkamachi, Niigata Prefecture, Japan

Shinza Station しんざ駅
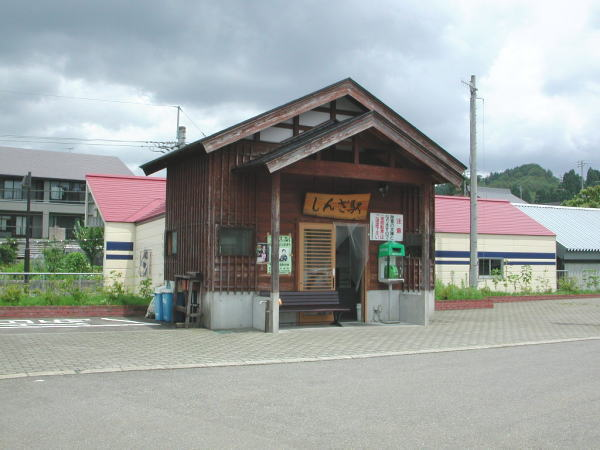
- Shinza Station in July 2004

General information
- Location: Shinzakō, Tōkamachi-shi, Niigata-ken 948-0000; Japan
- Coordinates: 37.1398°N 138.7684°E
- Elevation: 158.2 m
- Operator: Hokuetsu Express
- Line: ■ Hokuhoku Line
- Distance: 14.4 km from Muikamachi
- Platforms: 1 side platform
- Tracks: 1

Other information
- Status: Unstaffed
- Website: Official website

History
- Opened: 22 March 1997; 29 years ago

Passengers
- FY2011: 102 daily
Location
- Location within Hokuhoku Line Location within Japan

Shinza Station (しんざ駅, Shinza-eki) is a railway station on the Hokuhoku Line in the city of Tōkamachi, Niigata, Japan, operated by the third-sector rail operator Hokuetsu Express.

== Lines ==
Shinza Station is served by the Hokuhoku Line, and is located 14.4 kilometers from the starting point of the line at Muikamachi.

== Station layout ==
The station has a single ground-level side platform serving one bi-directional track. The station is unattended.

== Adjacent stations ==
«	Service	»
Hokuhoku Line
Misashima	Local	Tōkamachi

== History ==
Shinza Station opened on 22 March 1997, coinciding with the opening of the Hokuhoku Line.

== Passenger statistics ==
In fiscal 2011, the station was used by an average of 102 passengers daily.

== Surrounding area ==
- Tōkamachi Elementary School
- Tōkamachi Junior High School

== See also ==
- List of railway stations in Japan
