= Saigata Station =

Railway station in Jōetsu, Niigata Prefecture, Japan

Saigata Station 犀潟駅
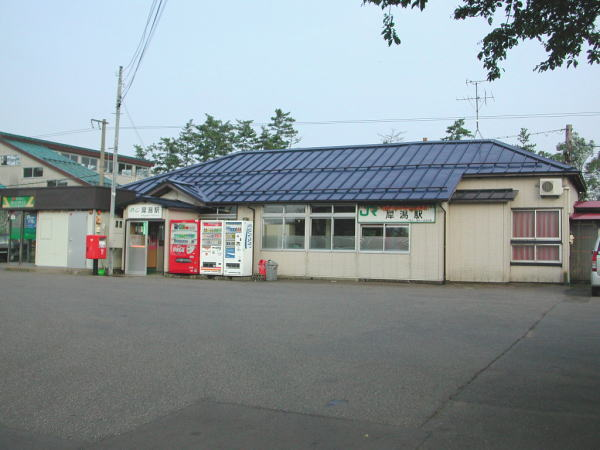
- Saigata Station in July 2004

General information
- Location: 600-1 Saigata, Ōgata-ku, Jōetsu-shi, Niigata-ken 949-3116
- Coordinates: 37.2103°N 138.3045°E
- Operator: JR East; Hokuetsu Express
- Lines: ■ Shinetsu Main Line; ■ Hokuhoku Line
- Platforms: 1 island + 1 side platform

Other information
- Status: Staffed
- Website: Official website

History
- Opened: 13 May 1897; 129 years ago

Passengers
- FY2017: 700 (daily)

Services
Preceding station	JR East	Following station
Naoetsu Terminus	Shin'etsu Main Line Rapid	Kakizaki towards Niigata
Kuroi towards Naoetsu	Shin'etsu Main Line Local	Dosokohama towards Niigata
Preceding station	Hokuhoku Express	Following station
Kuroi (limited service) towards Naoetsu	Hokuhoku Line Local	Kubiki towards Echigo-Yuzawa
Location
- Location within JR Shinetsu Main Line Location within Hokuhoku Line Location within Japan

Saigata Station (犀潟駅, Saigata-eki) is a railway station in the city of Jōetsu, Niigata, Japan.

== Lines ==
Saigata Station is served by the East Japan Railway Company (JR East) Shinetsu Main Line and is 7.1 kilometers from the terminus of the line at Naoetsu Station. It is also served by the Hokuetsu Express Hokuhoku Line and is 59.7 kilometers from the terminus of the line at Muikamachi.

== Station layout ==
The station has one island platform and one side platform, connected by a footbridge.

=== Platforms ===
1	■ Shinetsu Main Line	for Kashiwazaki, Nagaoka, and Niigata
2	■ Hokuhoku Line	for Echigo-Yuzawa, Muikamachi, Tōkamachi, and Naoetsu
3	■ Shinetsu Main Line	for Naoetsu, Arai, Myōkō-Kōgen, Toyono, and Nagano

== History ==
The station opened on 13 March 1897. With the privatization of Japanese National Railways (JNR) on 1 April 1987, the station came under the control of JR East.

== Passenger statistics ==
In fiscal 2015, the station was used by an average of 700 passengers daily (boarding passengers only).

== Surrounding area ==
- National Route 8
- Ogata Post Office
