= Hokuhoku Line =

Railway line in Niigata prefecture, Japan

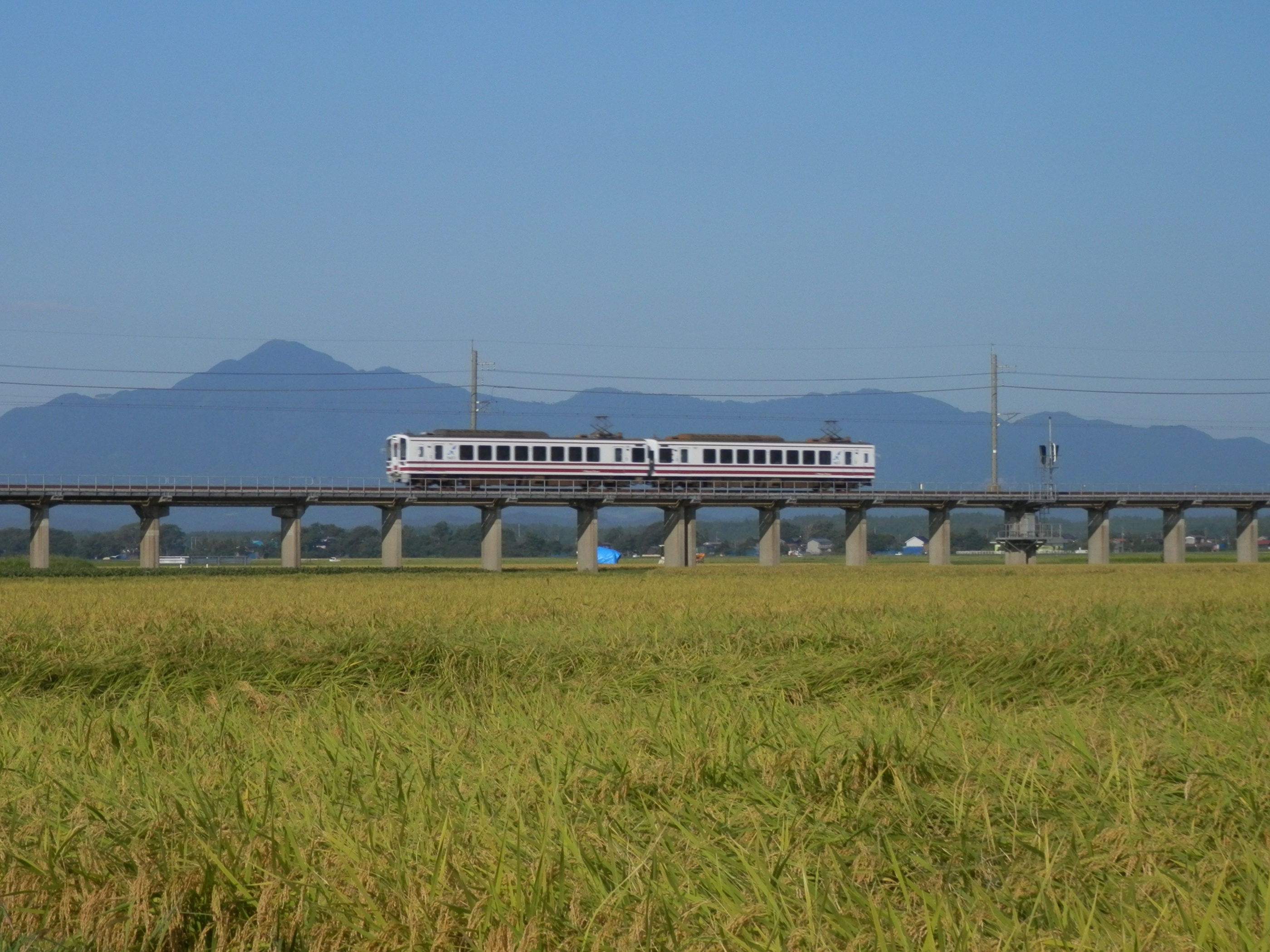
- A HK100 Yumezora train, Kubiki - Saigata, September 2014

Overview
- Owner: Hokuetsu Express
- Locale: Niigata Prefecture
- Termini: Muikamachi; Saigata
- Stations: 12

Service
- Operator: Hokuetsu Express

History
- Opened: 22 March 1997; 29 years ago

Technical
- Line length: 59.5 km (37.0 mi)
- Track gauge: 1,067 mm (3 ft 6 in)
- Electrification: 1,500 V DC overhead catenary
- Operating speed: 130 km/h (80 mph)
Route map

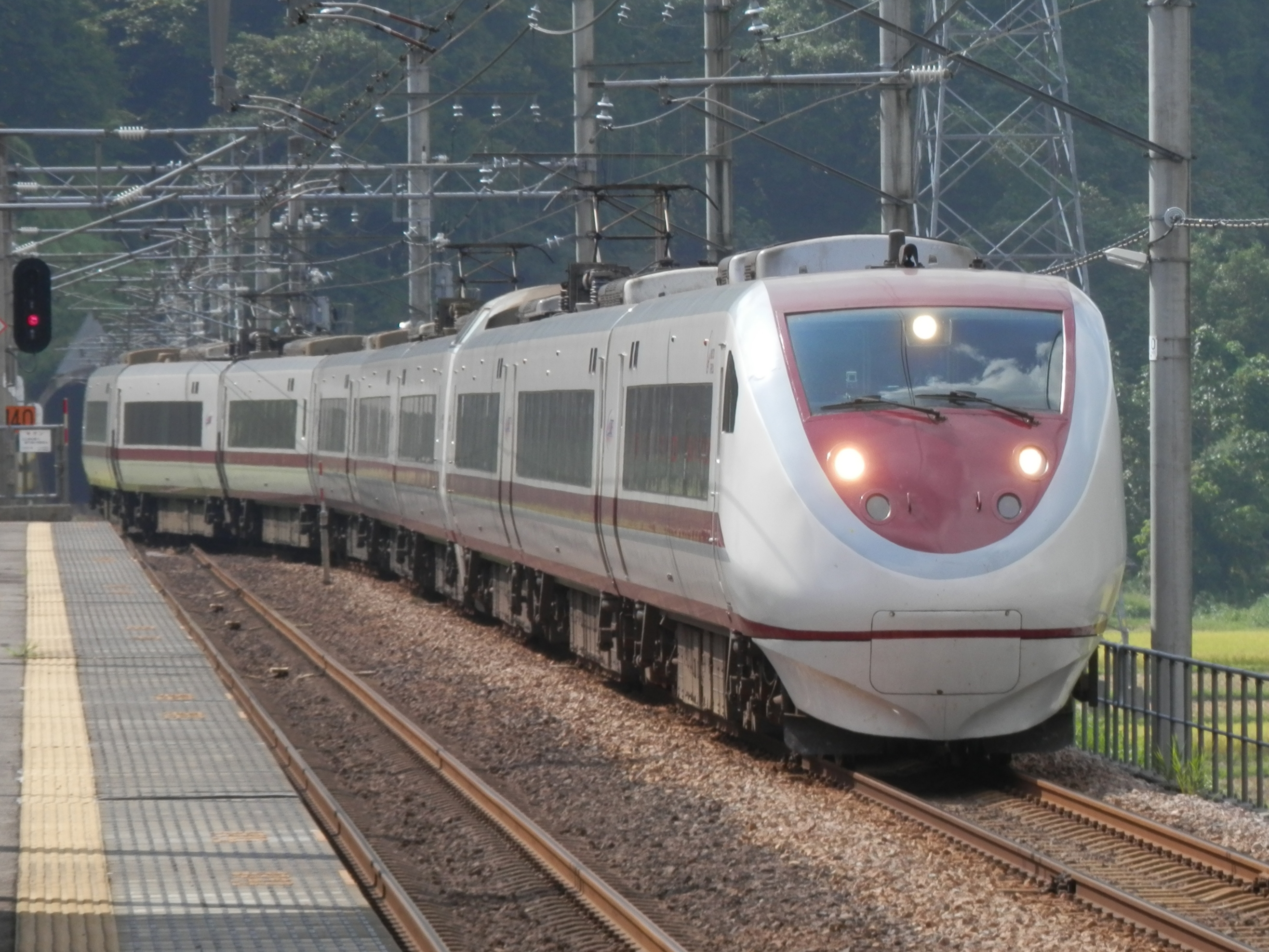
A 681 series Hakutaka limited express train at Mushigawa-Ōsugi Station, September 2014

The Hokuhoku Line (ほくほく線, Hokuhoku-sen) is a Japanese railway line in Niigata Prefecture that runs from Muikamachi in Minamiuonuma City to Saigata in Jōetsu City. It is the sole railway line operated by third-sector railway company Hokuetsu Express (北越急行, Hokuetsu Kyūkō). Construction of the line first began in 1968 by the Japanese National Railways (JNR), and was initially referred to as the Hokuetsu-Kita Line (北越北線, Hokuetsu-kita-sen). However, the construction of the line was plagued by numerous delays, and was finally completed on 22 March 1997, including the 10,472 m (6.5 mi) Akakura Tunnel, the longest on a non-JR line.

Unlike most other third sector company lines, the Hokuhoku Line made steady profits after its opening, as the former Hakutaka Limited Express train service, which travelled using the line, served as the principal link between the Tokyo metropolitan area and the Hokuriku region until the opening of the Hokuriku Shinkansen in 2015. The line's former maximum speed limit of 160 km/h (99 mph) allowed the Hakutaka to become the fastest narrow gauge train service in the country, matched only by the standard gauge Keisei Skyliner services to Narita International Airport as the fastest non-Shinkansen service (also at 160 km/h (99 mph)); however, following the withdrawal of Hakutaka services on the line on 14 March 2015, the maximum speed limit of the line was reduced to 130 km/h (80 mph).

== Services ==
Some services operate through to Naoetsu or Echigo-Yuzawa.

Originally, the line acted as a connecting route to the Jōetsu Shinkansen at Echigo-Yuzawa Station. Upon the opening of the Hokuriku Shinkansen on 14 March 2015, the limited express services Hakutaka of the line, which had run from 1997 with an average daily ridership of 6,900 passengers, were withdrawn. Since then, a daily special rapid service Snow Rabbit has been served, instead of Hakutaka, until 18 March 2023, where all rapid service has been discontinued.

Trains from Muikamachi are described as down-bound, whereas those from Niigata are described as up-bound.

=== Active service ===
==== Local Service ====
17 return trips are operating each day, with additional 1 service operating on weekends and holidays. Two return trips running on Sundays are designated as Yumezora, in which movies will be played on the ceiling of the train when the trains are going through a tunnel. Since the discontinuation of Hakutaka in 2015, required trip time is reduced by 10 minutes. Through-trains to and from JR Lines do not stop at some stations of the Jōetsu Line and Shin'etsu Main Line.

==== Chō-Slow Service - Snow Turtle (スノータートル) ====
Snow Turtle is a special service with irregular schedules and available for rental by organizations. Being a comical counterpart of Snow Rabbit, the trains run at a very low speed, as slow as 10 km/h (6.2 mph), to give passengers a chance to experience winds while opening the side doors of the trains. Meals are also provided during the four-hour journey.

=== Discontinued (since 18 March 2023) ===
==== Rapid Service ====
Two down-bound and three up-bound trains are operating each day between Echigo-Yuzawa and Naoetsu.

==== Chō-Rapid Service - Snow Rabbit (スノーラビット) ====
Two down-bound and one up-bound trains are operating each day, and one of the down-bound train runs through to Arai of the Myōkōhaneuma Line. The fastest service, which stops only at Tōkamachi, only takes 57 minutes travelling from Echigo-Yuzawa to Naoetsu.

== Passing loops ==
There are three passing loops on the Hokuhoku Line. Each has one bi-directional through track to allow full line speed. However, the passing loops has been abandoned since the discontinuation of Hakutaka service.

=== Akakura ===
Between Uonumakyūryō and Misashima in Tōkamachi, Niigata. It is in the 10472m Akakura tunnel.

=== Yakushitōge ===
Between Tōkamachi and Matsudai in Tōkamachi, Niigata. It is in the 6199m Yakushitōge tunnel.

=== Gimyō ===
Between Matsudai and Hokuhoku-Ōshima in Tōkamachi, Niigata. It is in the 9,130 m (29,954 ft) Nabetachiyama tunnel(ja:鍋立山トンネル).

== Gallery ==
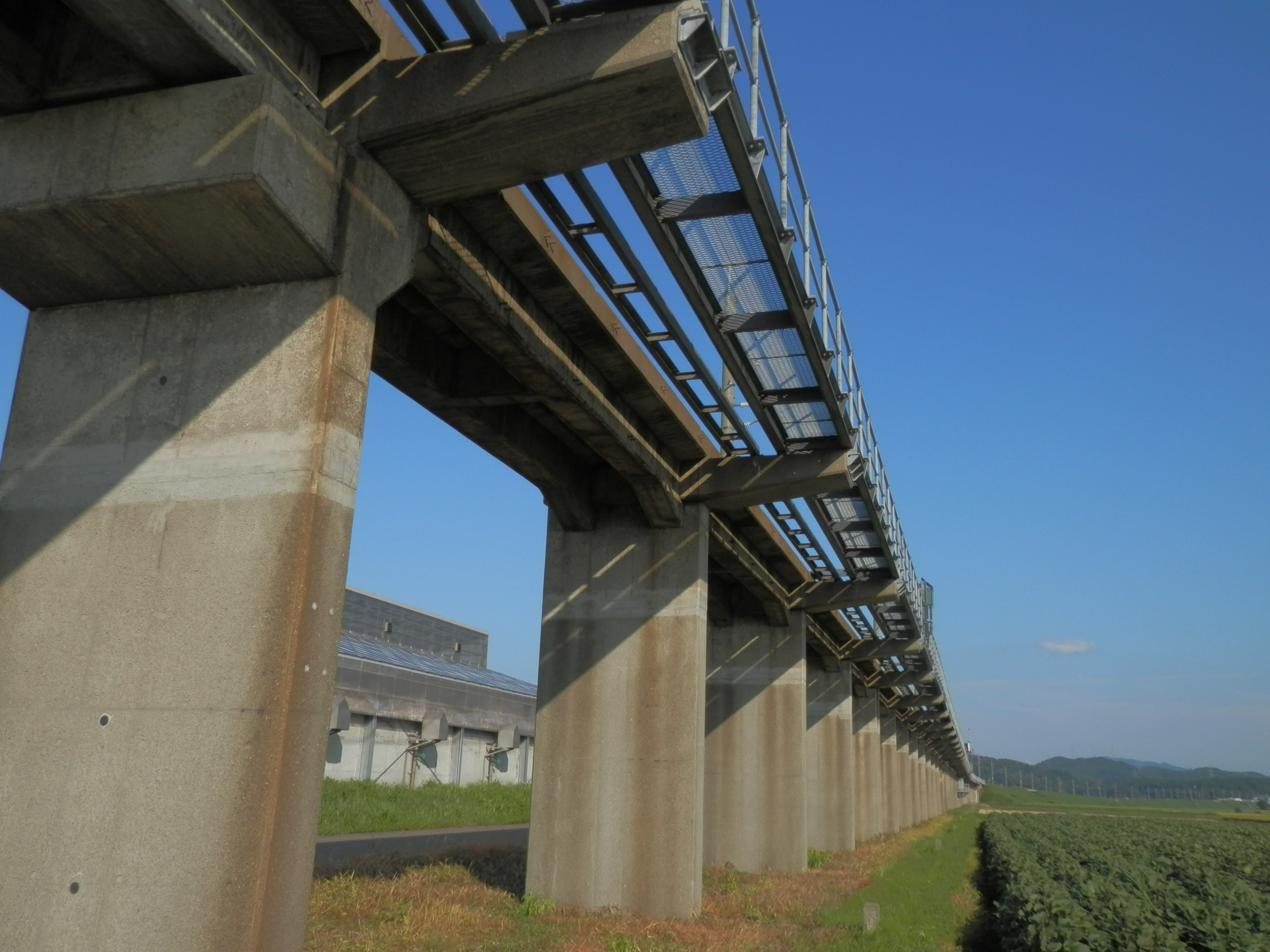
Open-floor viaduct near Kubiki Station

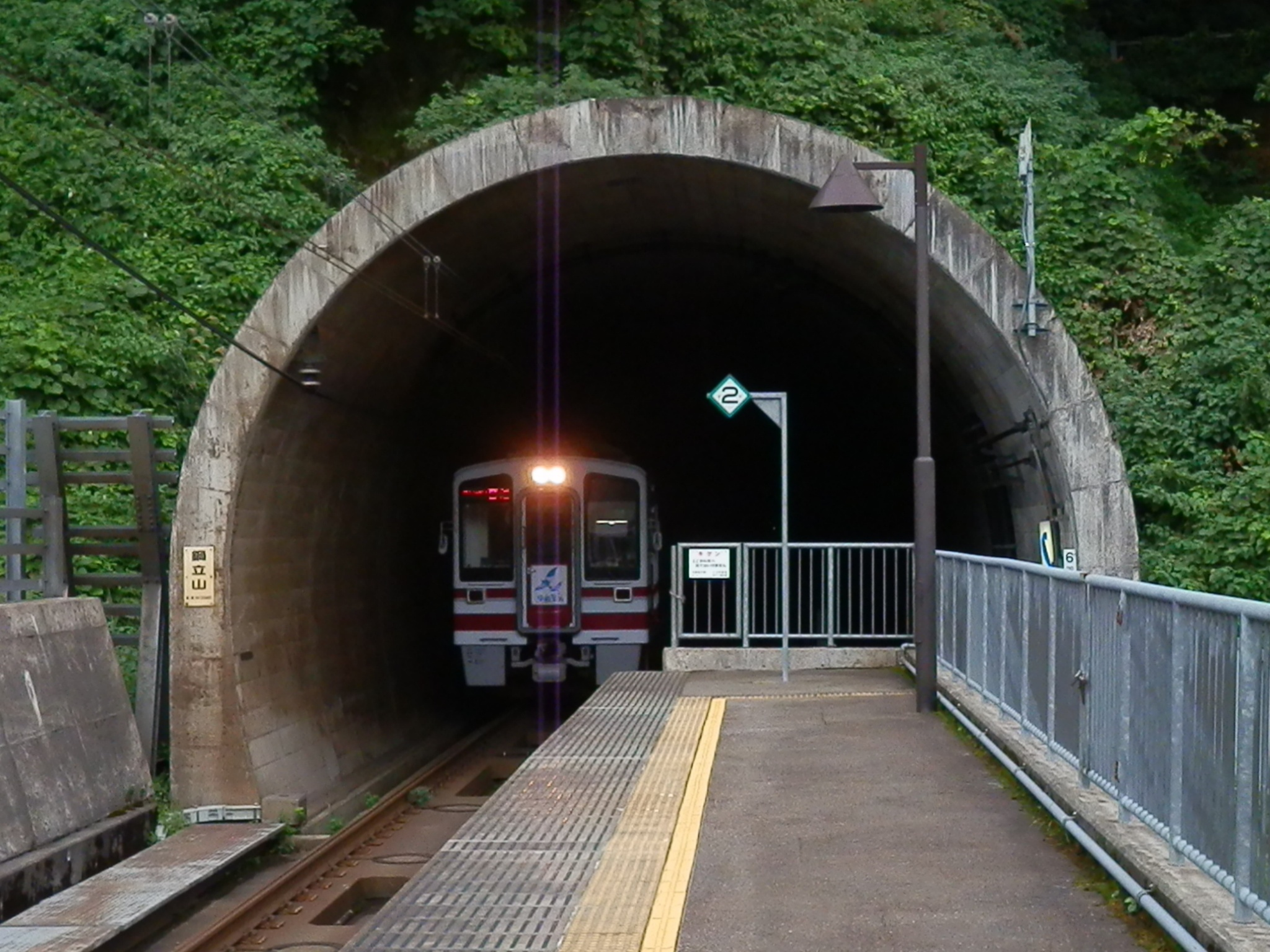
Nabetachiyama Tunnel

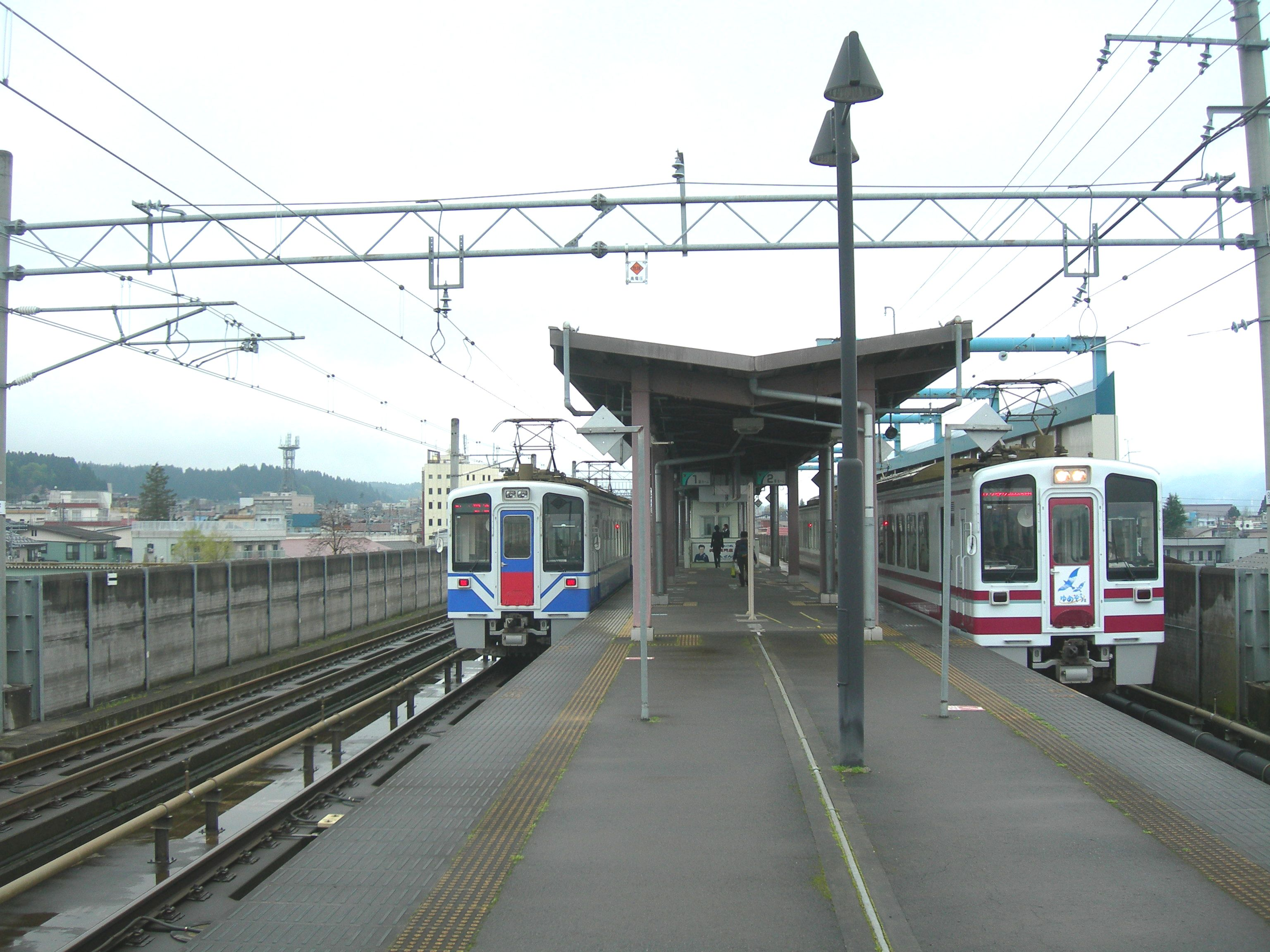
Tokamachi station

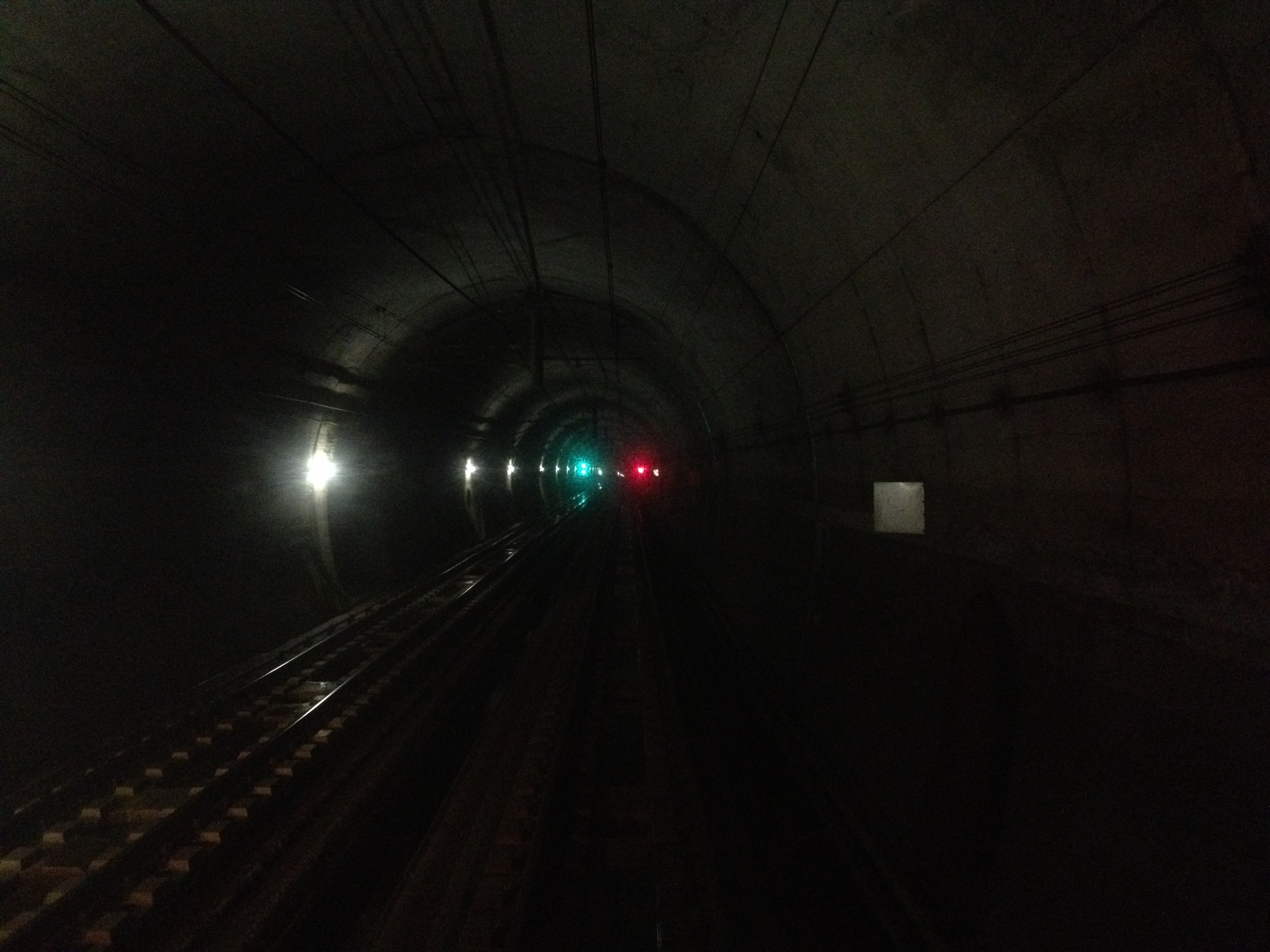
Akakura passing loops

== Rolling Stock ==
- HK100 series 1-car (10 sets) and HK100-100 series 2-car (1 set) 12 cars

10 HK100-0 series single-car units were built by Niigata Transys for use on local, rapid and Chō-Rapid Snow Rabbit trains between Echigo-Yuzawa and Naoetsu, and started operation since its opening in 1997. Having a maximum speed of 110 km/h operating on the 160 km/h lines, these trains feature a fast acceleration of 3.0 km/h/s to minimize disruptions of Hakutaka train services. 1 permanent 2-car set known as HK100-100 series entered service in 2003 for the Yumezora video projection and event train together with 2 units of HK100-0 refurbished in 2008 named Yumezora II.

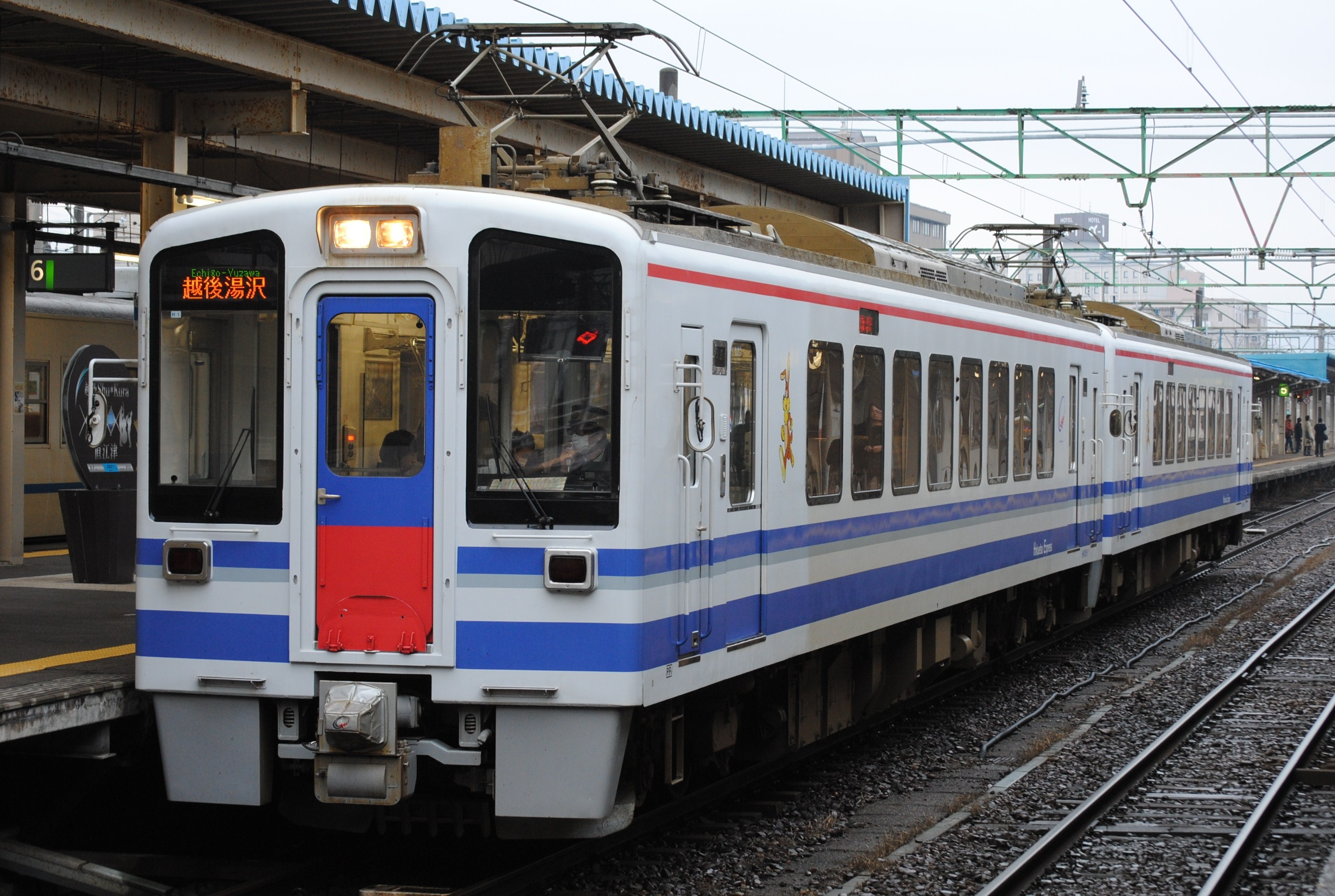
HK100-0 train

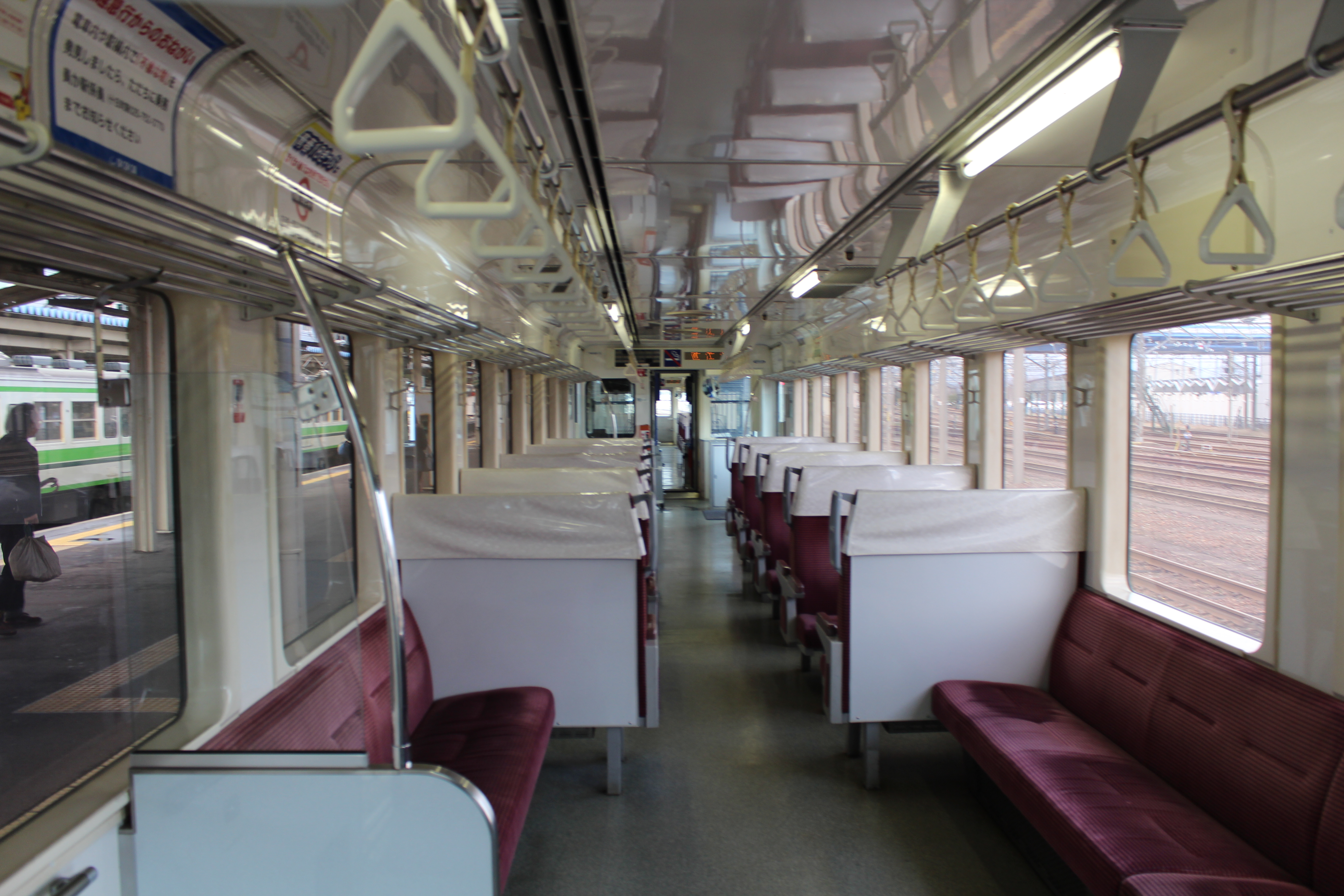
Regular HK-100-0 series interior

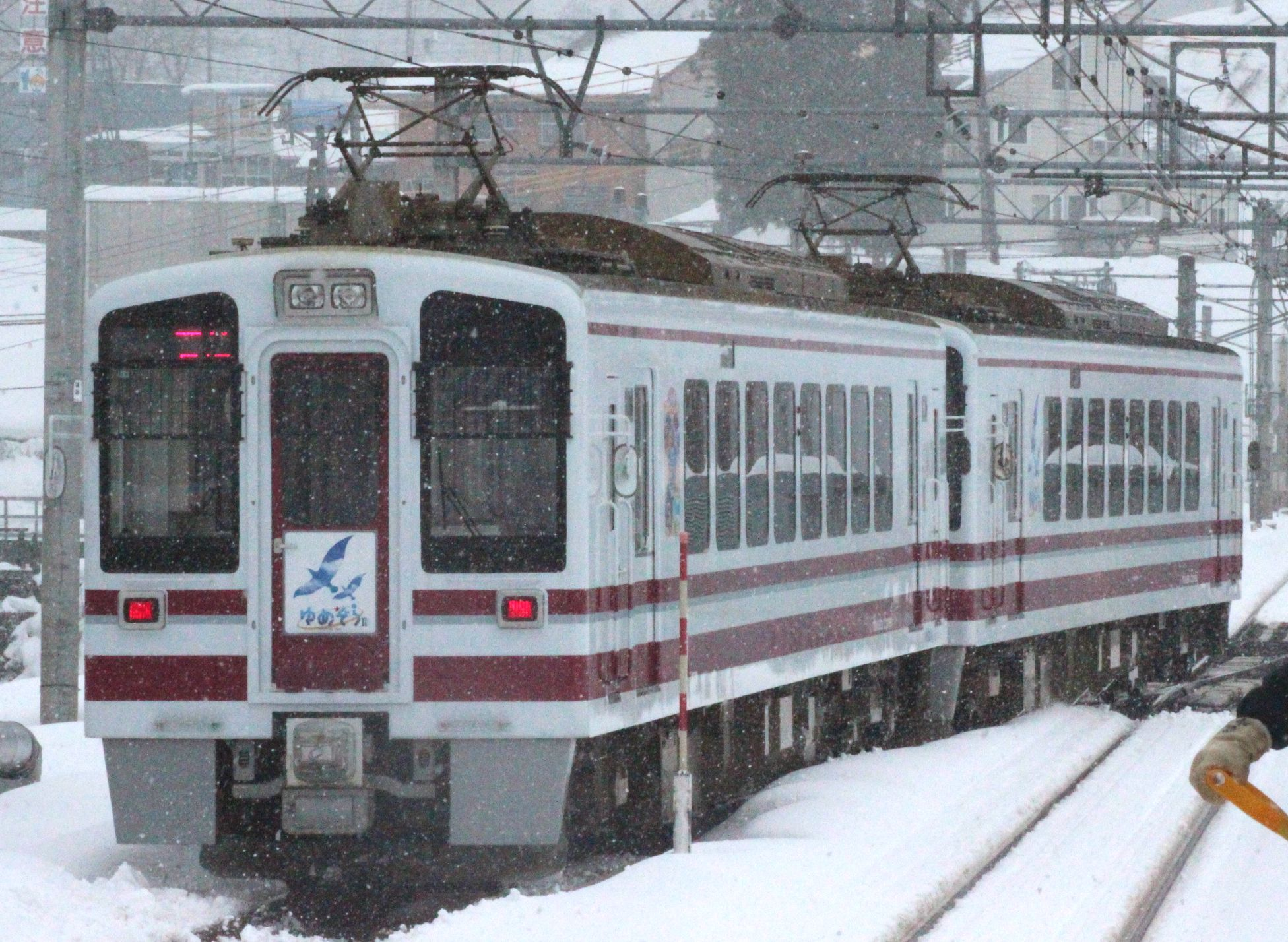
Modified HK100-0 series Yumezora II

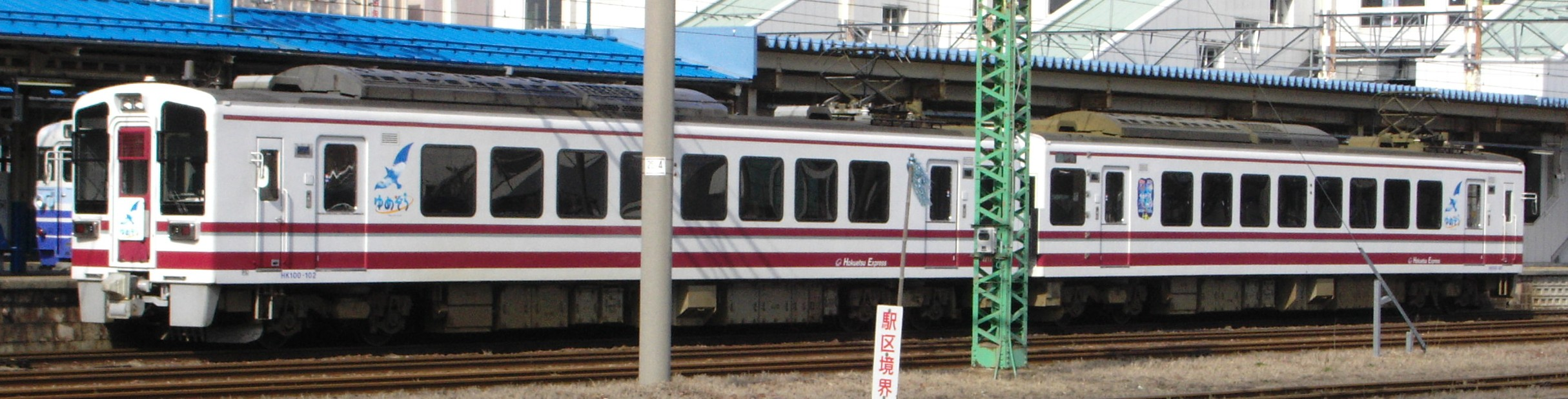
Permanent 2-car HK-100-100 train set for Yumezora video projection train

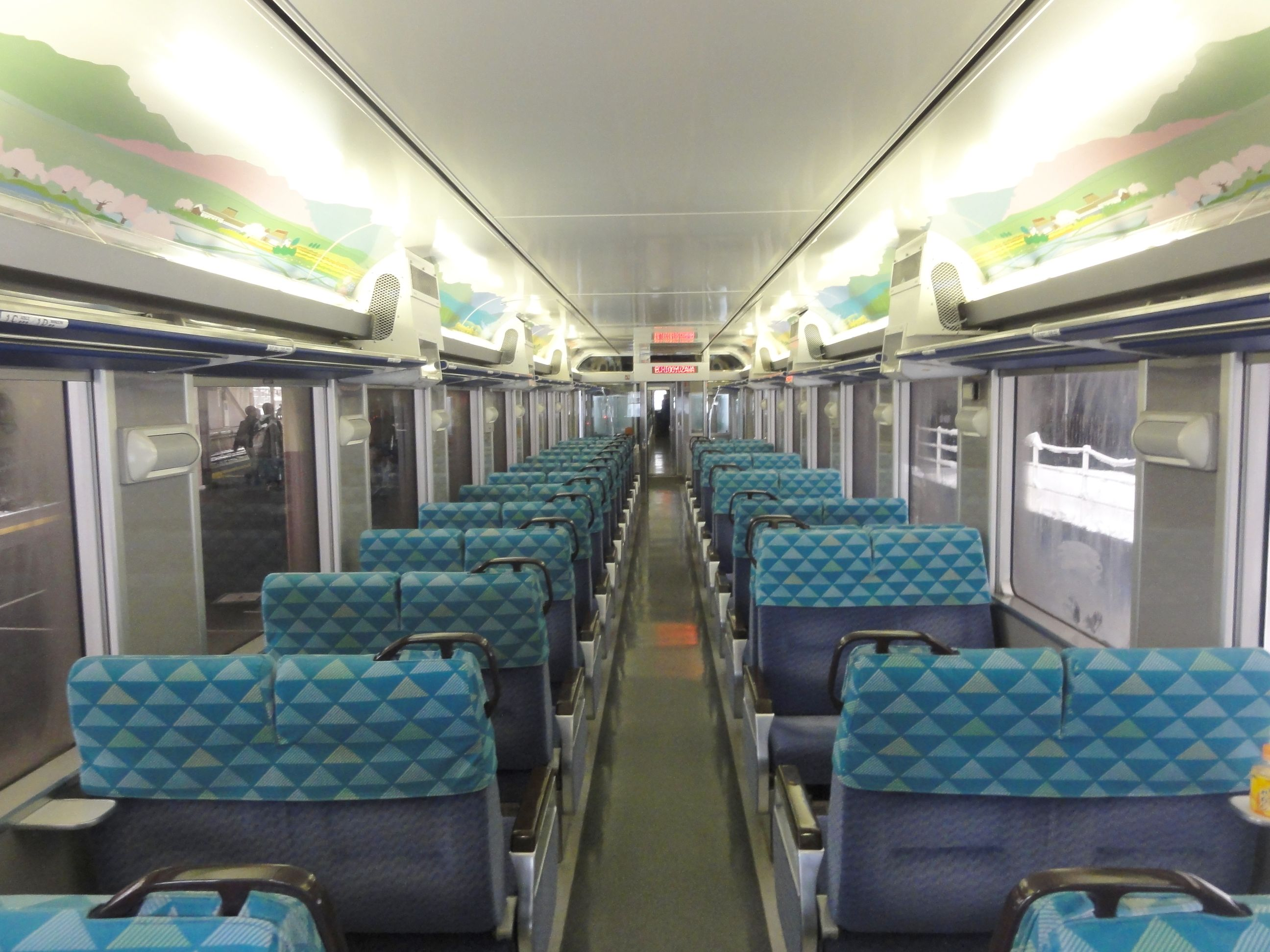
Interior of HK100 Yumezora, dream sky train

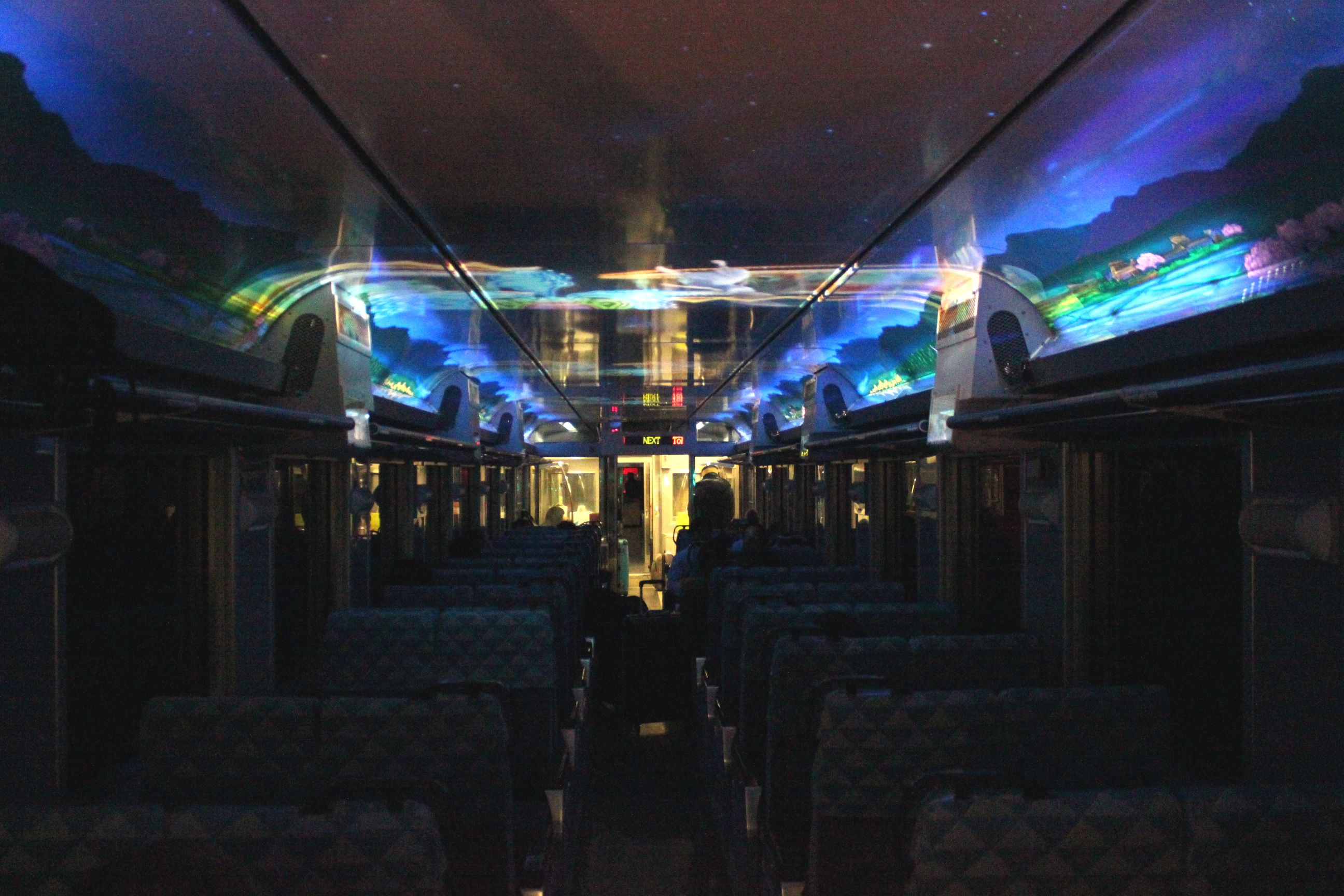
Interior of HK100 Yumezora while going through a tunnel.
Video projections are displayed on the ceiling on Sundays and holidays.

=== Former ===
- 681-2000 series - Hakutaka
- 683-8000 series - Hakutaka

18 cars of 681-2000 series and 9 cars of 683-8000 series trains, nicknamed Snow Rabbit Express (SRE) were built by Kawasaki Heavy Industries, with final assembly at Niigata Transys for operation on the Hakutaka limited express trains between Echigo-Yuzawa and Kanazawa stations. At a operating speed of 160 km/h, this was the fastest train in the country to run on narrow gauge. Following the retirement of the Hakutaka services, the trains were transferred to JR West for operation on Shirasagi limited express services.

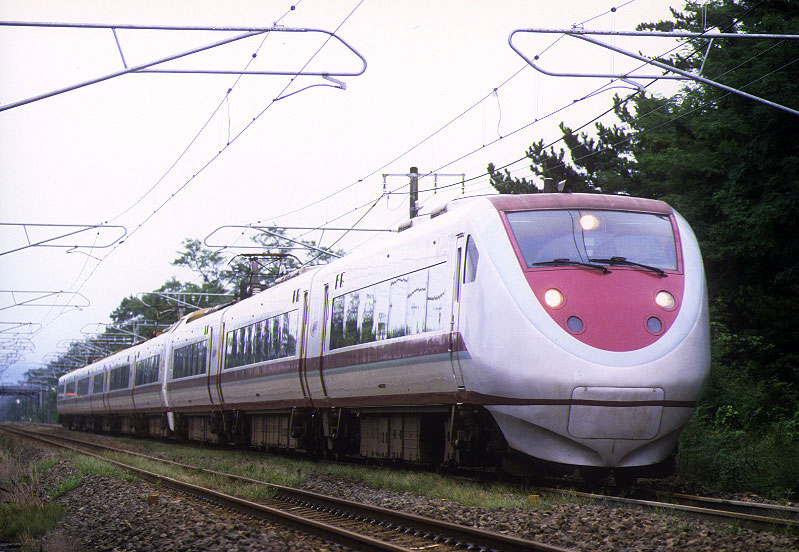
Hokuetsu Express 681-2000 series

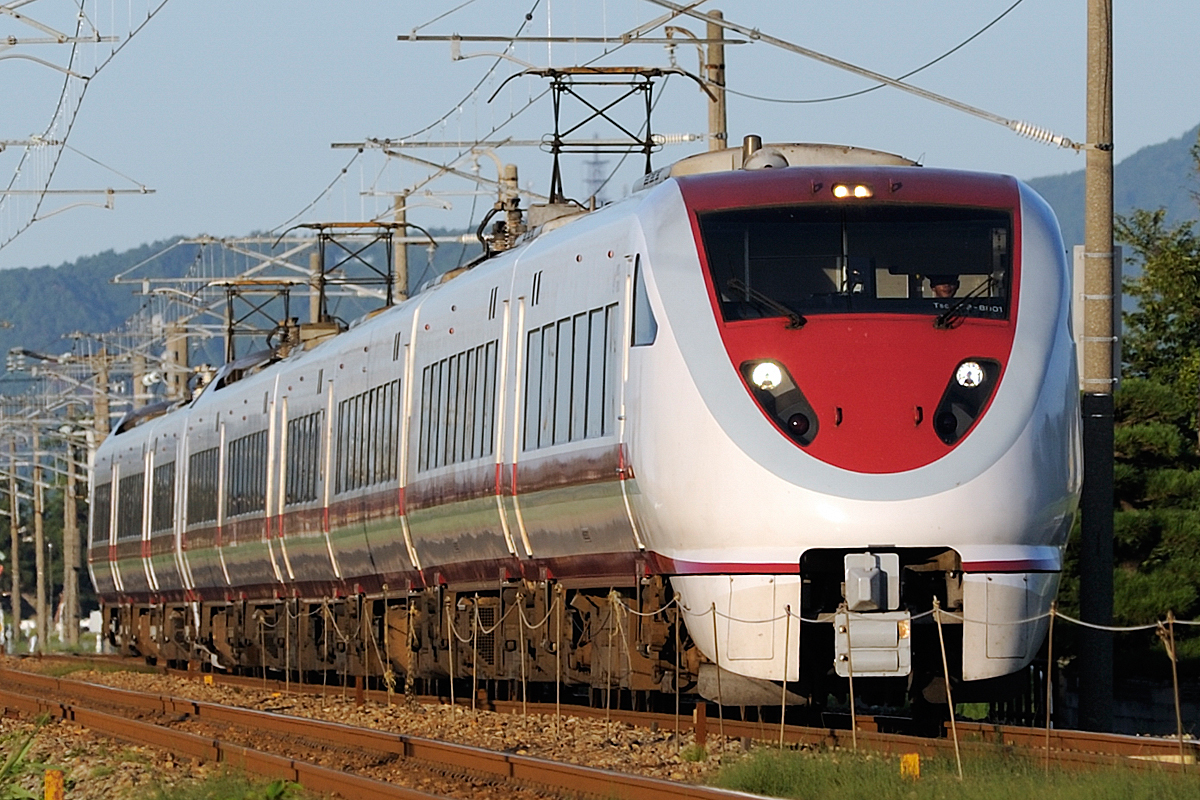
Hokuetsu Express 683-8000 series

== Stations ==
The Hokuhoku line is entirely in Niigata Prefecture.

- Service patterns:
  - ● All trains stop
  - ○ Some trains stop
  - ｜ All trains pass
  - ＊ Seasonal stop
- Track:
  - ∥: Double-track section
  - ∧: Double-track section begins
  - ∨: Double-track section ends
  - ｜: Single-track section
  - ◇: Passing loop

Line	Name		Distance	Local	Transfers	Track	Location
Jōetsu Line	Echigo-Yuzawa	越後湯沢	17.6	●	Jōetsu Shinkansen; JR East: ■ Jōetsu Line (for Minakami)	∥	Yuzawa
Jōetsu Line	Ishiuchi	石打	11.2	｜	■ Jōetsu Line	∥	Minamiuonuma
Jōetsu Line	Ōsawa	大沢	7.2	｜	■ Jōetsu Line	∥	Minamiuonuma
Jōetsu Line	Jōetsu International Skiing Ground	上越国際スキー場前	6.2	＊	■ Jōetsu Line	∥	Minamiuonuma
Jōetsu Line	Shiozawa	塩沢	3.9	○	■ Jōetsu Line	∥	Minamiuonuma
Jōetsu Line	Muikamachi	六日町	0.0	●	JR East: ■ Jōetsu Line (for Urasa)	∨	Minamiuonuma
Hokuhoku Line	Uonuma-Kyūryō	魚沼丘陵	3.6	●		｜	Minamiuonuma
Hokuhoku Line	Misashima	美佐島	12.2	●		｜	Tōkamachi
Hokuhoku Line	Shinza	しんざ	14.4	●		｜	Tōkamachi
Hokuhoku Line	Tōkamachi	十日町	15.9	●	JR East: ■ Iiyama Line	◇	Tōkamachi
Hokuhoku Line	Matsudai	まつだい	29.2	●		◇	Tōkamachi
Hokuhoku Line	Hokuhoku-Ōshima	ほくほく大島	38.6	●		｜	Jōetsu
Hokuhoku Line	Mushigawa-Ōsugi	虫川大杉	44.8	●		◇	Jōetsu
Hokuhoku Line	Uragawara	うらがわら	46.8	●		｜	Jōetsu
Hokuhoku Line	Ōike-Ikoi-no-mori	大池いこいの森	51.7	●		｜	Jōetsu
Hokuhoku Line	Kubiki	くびき	53.6	●		◇	Jōetsu
Shin'etsu Main Line	Saigata	犀潟	59.5	●	JR East: ■ Shin'etsu Main Line {for Niigata)	∧	Jōetsu
Shin'etsu Main Line	Kuroi	黒井	63.9	○	■ Shin'etsu Main Line	∥	Jōetsu
Shin'etsu Main Line	Naoetsu	直江津	66.6	●	Echigo Tokimeki Railway: ■ Nihonkai Hisui Line, ■ Myōkō Haneuma Line; JR East: ■ Shin'etsu Main Line	∥	Jōetsu

== See also ==
- List of railway companies in Japan
- List of railway lines in Japan
- Densha de Go! - a Japanese series of train simulation games, some of which featured the line
- Shareholders
  - Niigata Prefecture - 54.8%
  - Joetsu, Niigata - 13.2%
  - Tokamachi, Niigata - 11.9%
  - Echigo Kotsu - 2.2%
