= Tōkamachi Station =

Railway station in Tōkamachi, Niigata Prefecture, Japan

Tōkamachi Station 十日町駅
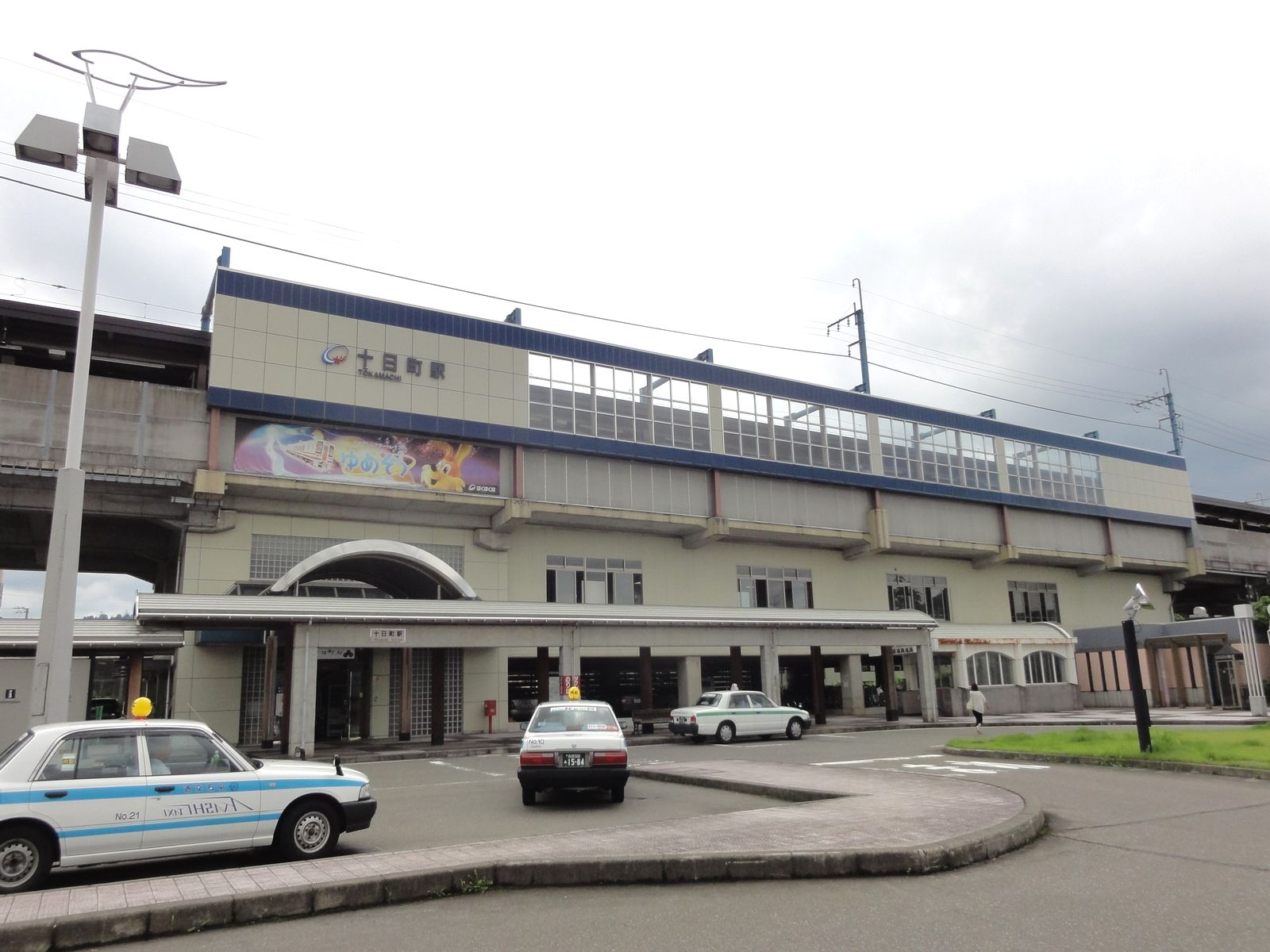
- Tōkamachi Station for Hokuetsu Express

General information
- Location: Ushi, Tōkamachi-shi, Niigata-ken 948-0079; Japan
- Coordinates: 37°8′5.53″N 138°45′24.06″E
- Operator: JR East; Hokuhoku Express
- Lines: ■Iiyama Line; ■ Hokuhoku Line
- Platforms: 1 side + 2 island platforms

Other information
- Status: Staffed (Midori no Madoguchi)

History
- Opened: 15 November 1927; 98 years ago

Passengers
- FY2017: 505 daily (JR)

Services
Preceding station	JR East	Following station
Doichi towards Nagano	Iiyama Line	Uonuma-Nakajō towards Echigo-Kawaguchi
Preceding station	Hokuhoku Express	Following station
Matsudai towards Naoetsu	Hokuhoku Line Local	Shinza towards Echigo-Yuzawa
Location
- Location within Japan

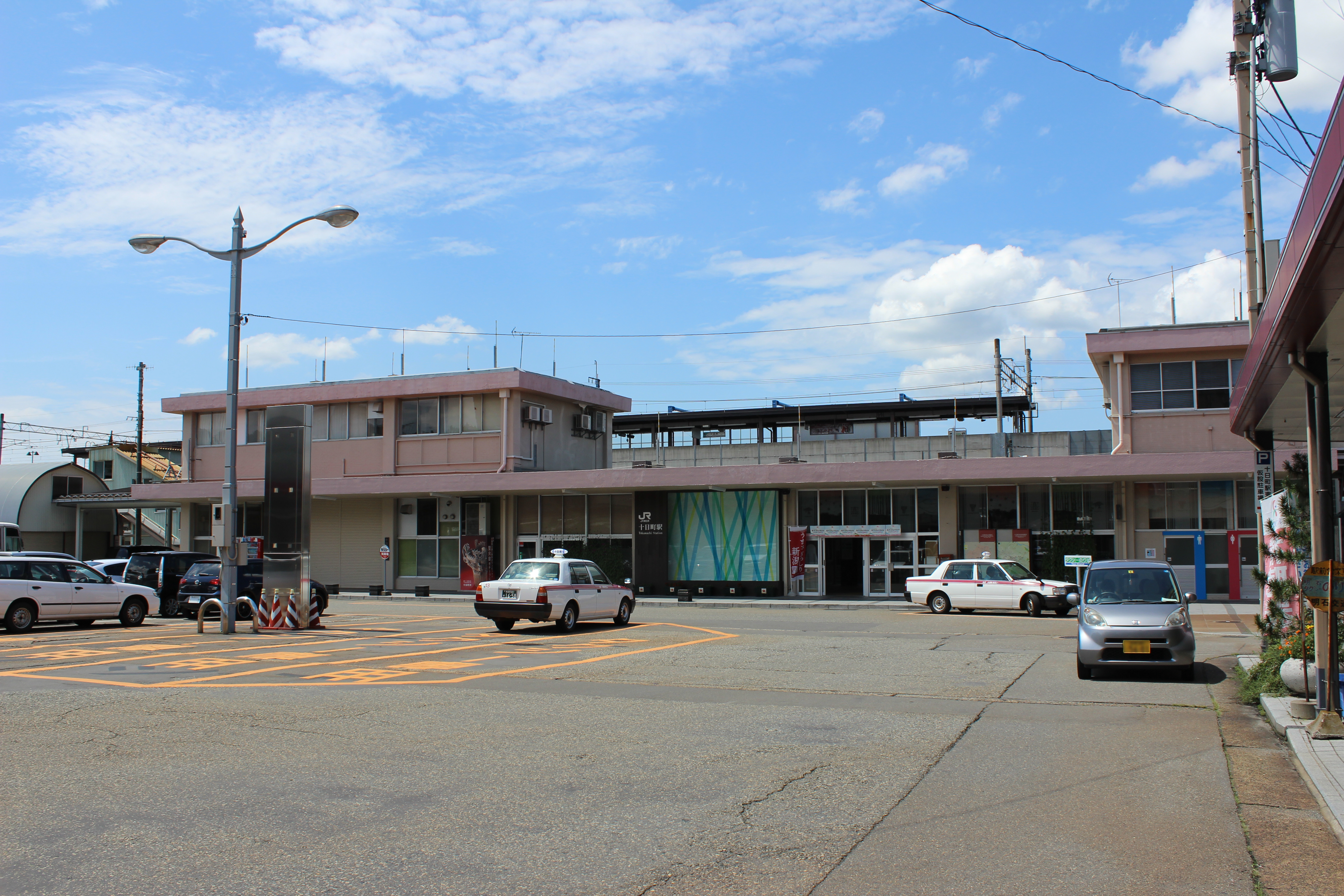
The east entrance, August 2014

Tōkamachi Station (十日町駅, Tōkamachi-eki) is a railway station located in the city of Tōkamachi, Niigata, operated jointly by the East Japan Railway Company (JR East) and the third sector Hokuetsu Express.

== Lines ==
Tōkamachi Station is a station on the Iiyama Line, and is located 75.3 kilometers from the starting point of the line at Toyono. It is also a station for the Hokuhoku Line and is located 15.9 kilometers from the terminus of the line at Muikamachi Station.

== Station layout ==
The JR portion of the station has a single side platform and island platforms serving three ground-level tracks connected by a footbridge. The station has a Midori no Madoguchi staffed ticket office. The Hokuetsu Express portion of the station has a single elevated island platform serving two tracks.

=== JR East ===
1	■ Iiyama Line	for Togari-Nozawaonsen, Iiyama , and Nagano
2	■ Iiyama Line	for Togari-Nozawaonsen, Iiyama and Nagano for Echigo-Kawaguchi and Nagaoka
3	■ Iiyama Line	for Echigo-Kawaguchi and Nagaoka

=== Hokuetsu Express ===
11	■ Hokuhoku Line	for Saigata and Naoetsu
12	■ Hokuhoku Line	for Muikamachi and Echigo-Yuzawa

== History ==
Tōkamachi Station opened on 15 November 1927. Following the privatization of Japanese National Railways (JNR) on 1 April 1987, the station came under the control of JR East.

The Hokuhoku Line station opened on 22 March 1997, coinciding with the opening of the Hokuhoku Line.

== Passenger statistics ==
In fiscal 2017, the station was used by an average of 505 passengers daily (boarding passengers only).

== Surrounding area ==
- National Route 117
- Tōkamachi City Hospital

== See also ==
- List of railway stations in Japan
