= Echigo-Yuzawa Station =

Railway station in Yuzawa, Niigata Prefecture, Japan

Echigo-Yuzawa Station 越後湯沢駅
- Echigo-Yuzawa Station on 17 July 2021

Japanese name
- Shinjitai: 越後湯沢駅
- Kyūjitai: 越後湯澤驛
- Hiragana: えちごゆざわえき

General information
- Location: Yuzawa-Mondo, Yuzawa Town, Minami-Uonuma District, Niigata Prefecture 949-6101; Japan
- Coordinates: 36.936103°N 138.809896°E
- Elevation: 351.9 m (1,155 ft)
- Operator: JR East
- Lines: Jōetsu Shinkansen; Jōetsu Line
- Platforms: 4 island platforms + 1 side platform
- Tracks: 9

Construction
- Structure type: Elevated (Shinkansen); At grade (conventional lines)

Other information
- Status: Staffed (Reserved seat ticket vending machine installation)
- Website: Echigo-Yuzawa Station information (越後湯沢駅 駅情報)

History
- Opened: 1 November 1925; 101 years ago

Passengers
- FY2017: 3,059 daily

Services
Preceding station	JR East	Following station
Jōmō-Kōgen towards Tokyo	Jōetsu Shinkansen Toki	Urasa towards Niigata
Jōmō-Kōgen towards Tokyo	Jōetsu Shinkansen Tanigawa	Gala-Yuzawa Terminus
Iwappara-Skiing Ground towards Takasaki	Jōetsu Line	Ishiuchi towards Nagaoka
Preceding station	Hokuhoku Express	Following station
Terminus	Hokuhoku Line Local	Shiozawa (limited service) towards Naoetsu
Location
- Location within Niigata Prefecture Location within Chubu region Location within Japan

Echigo-Yuzawa Station (Japanese: 越後湯沢駅, Hepburn: Echigo-Yuzawa-eki) is a railway station operated by East Japan Railway Company (JR East), located in the resort town of Yuzawa in Niigata Prefecture, Japan. The station is located 199.2 kilometres (123.8 mi) from Tokyo.

== Lines ==
Echigo-Yuzawa Station is serviced by the following lines:

- JR East
  - Joetsu Shinkansen
  - Joetsu Line
- Hokuetsu Express
  - Hokuhoku Line

== Station layout ==
The station has two ground-level island platforms and one side platform for normal trains and two elevated island platforms for the Joetsu Shinkansen. The station building is located above the local platforms and underneath the Shinkansen platforms. The station has a Talking reserved seat ticket vending machine (話せる指定席券売機). Facilities at the station include souvenir shopping and eating facilities, as well as a sake-themed attraction complete with an indoor onsen bath.

=== Platforms ===
0	■ Hokuhoku Line	for Muikamachi, Tōkamachi and Naoetsu
1	■ Jōetsu Line	(not normally in use)
2	■ Jōetsu Line	for Nagaoka
3	■ Jōetsu Line	for Echigo-Nakazato and Minakami
4	■ Jōetsu Line	(not in use)
11/12	■ Jōetsu Shinkansen	for Niigata and Gala-Yuzawa
13/14	■ Jōetsu Shinkansen	for Tokyo

== History ==
The station opened on 1 November 1925. With the privatization of Japanese National Railways (JNR) on 1 April 1987, the station came under the control of JR East. The Joetsu Shinkansen opened on 15 November 1982. The Gala-Yuzawa Line to Gala-Yuzawa Station opened on 20 December 1990.

== Passenger statistics ==
In fiscal 2017, the station was used by an average of 3,059 passengers daily (boarding passengers only).

== Bus routes ==
- Echigo Kotsu
  - For Mori-Miyanohara Station

== Surrounding area ==
- Yuzawa Town Hall
- Yuzawa Post Office
- National Route 17

== See also ==
- List of railway stations in Japan
