= Naoetsu Station =

Railway station in Jōetsu, Niigata Prefecture, Japan

Naoetsu Station 直江津駅
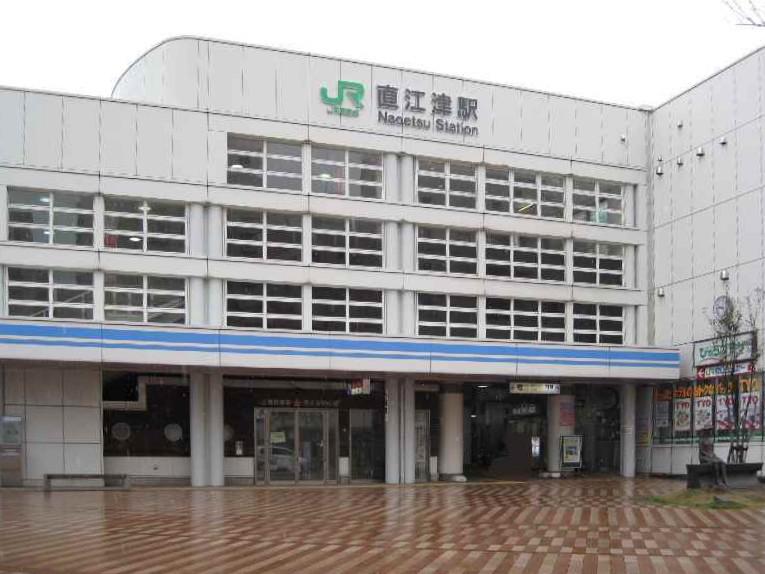
- Naoetsu Station in March 2010

General information
- Location: 1-1 Azuma-cho, Jōetsu-shi, Niigata-ken 942-0003; Japan
- Coordinates: 37.171021°N 138.243113°E
- Operator: JR East; Echigo Tokimeki Railway
- Lines: ■ Shinetsu Main Line; ■ Myōkō Haneuma Line; ■ Nihonkai Hisui Line; ■ Hokuhoku Line
- Platforms: 3 island platforms

Other information
- Status: Staffed (Midori no Madoguchi)
- Website: Official website

History
- Opened: 15 August 1886; 140 years ago

Passengers
- FY2017: 2,203 daily (JR); 1,514 daily (Echigo)

Services
Preceding station	JR East	Following station
through to Echigo TOKImeki	Shirayuki	Kakizaki towards Niigata
Terminus	Shin'etsu Main Line Rapid	Saigata towards Niigata
Terminus	Shin'etsu Main Line Local	Kuroi towards Niigata
Preceding station	Echigo TOKImeki	Following station
Kasugayama (limited service) towards Jōetsumyōkō	Shirayuki	through to JR East
Kasugayama towards Myōkō-Kōgen	Myōkō Haneuma Line	Terminus
Tanihama towards Ichiburi	Nihonkai Hisui Line	Terminus
Preceding station	Hokuhoku Express	Following station
Terminus	Hokuhoku Line Local	Kuroi (limited service) towards Echigo-Yuzawa
Location
- Location within Myoko Haneuma Line Location within Nihonkai Hisui Line Location within JR Shinetsu Main Line Location within Hokuhoku Line Location within Japan

Naoetsu Station (直江津駅, Naoetsu-eki) is a railway station in the city of Jōetsu, Niigata, Japan, jointly operated by East Japan Railway Company (JR East) and the third-sector railway operator Echigo Tokimeki Railway.

== Lines ==
Naoetsu Station is served by the JR East Shinetsu Main Line, and is a terminus for the line, whose tracks are shared by the Hokuetsu Express Hokuhoku Line. The station also is served by the Echigo Tokimeki Railway Myōkō Haneuma Line and is located 37.7 kilometers from the starting point of the line at Myōkō-Kōgen and 75.0 kilometers from Nagano. On the Nihonkai Hisui Line, it is located 59.3 kilometers from the starting point of the line at Ichiburi and 353.8 kilometers from Maibara.

== Station layout ==
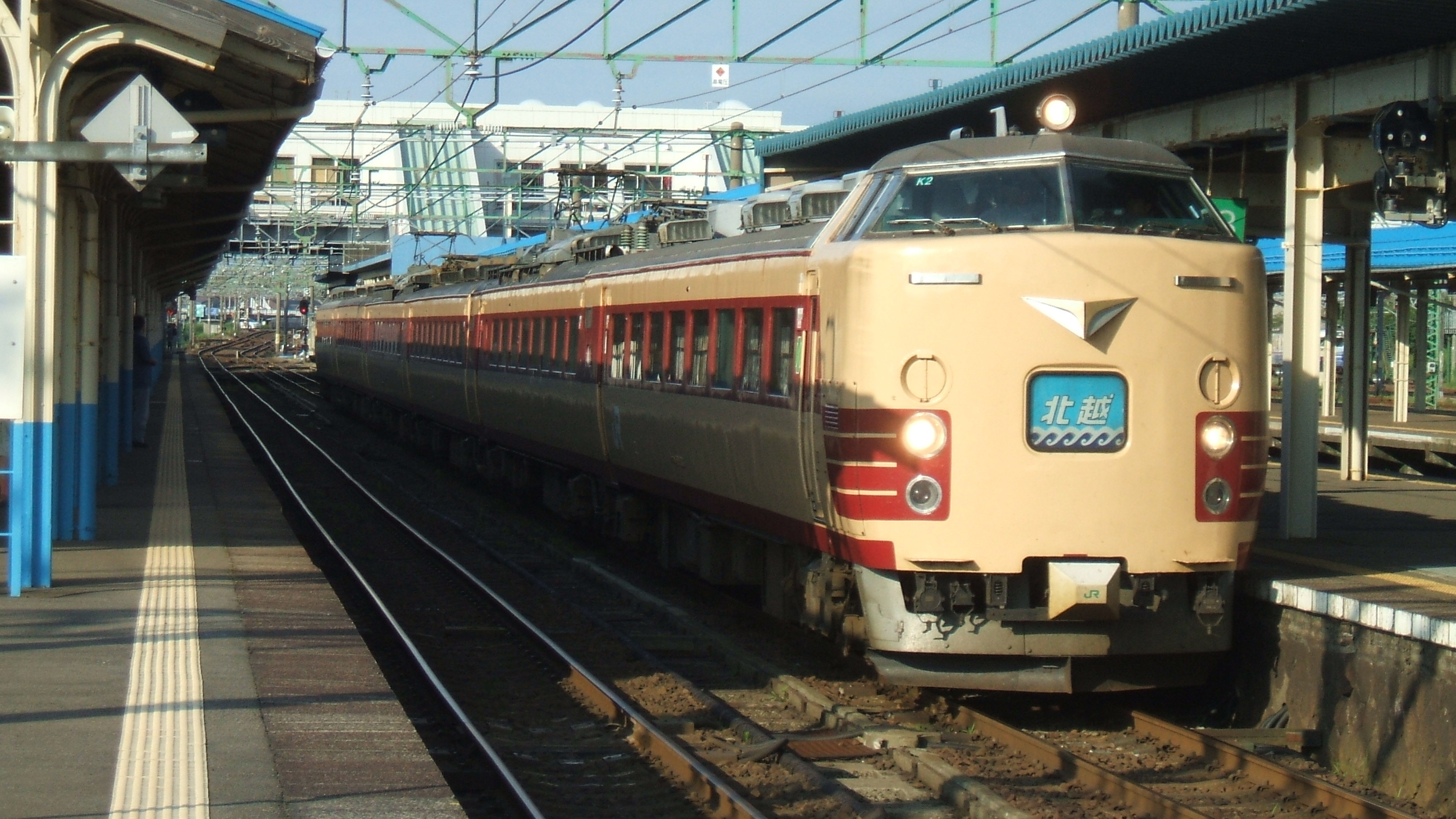
Limited express Hokuetsu and platforms in July 2010

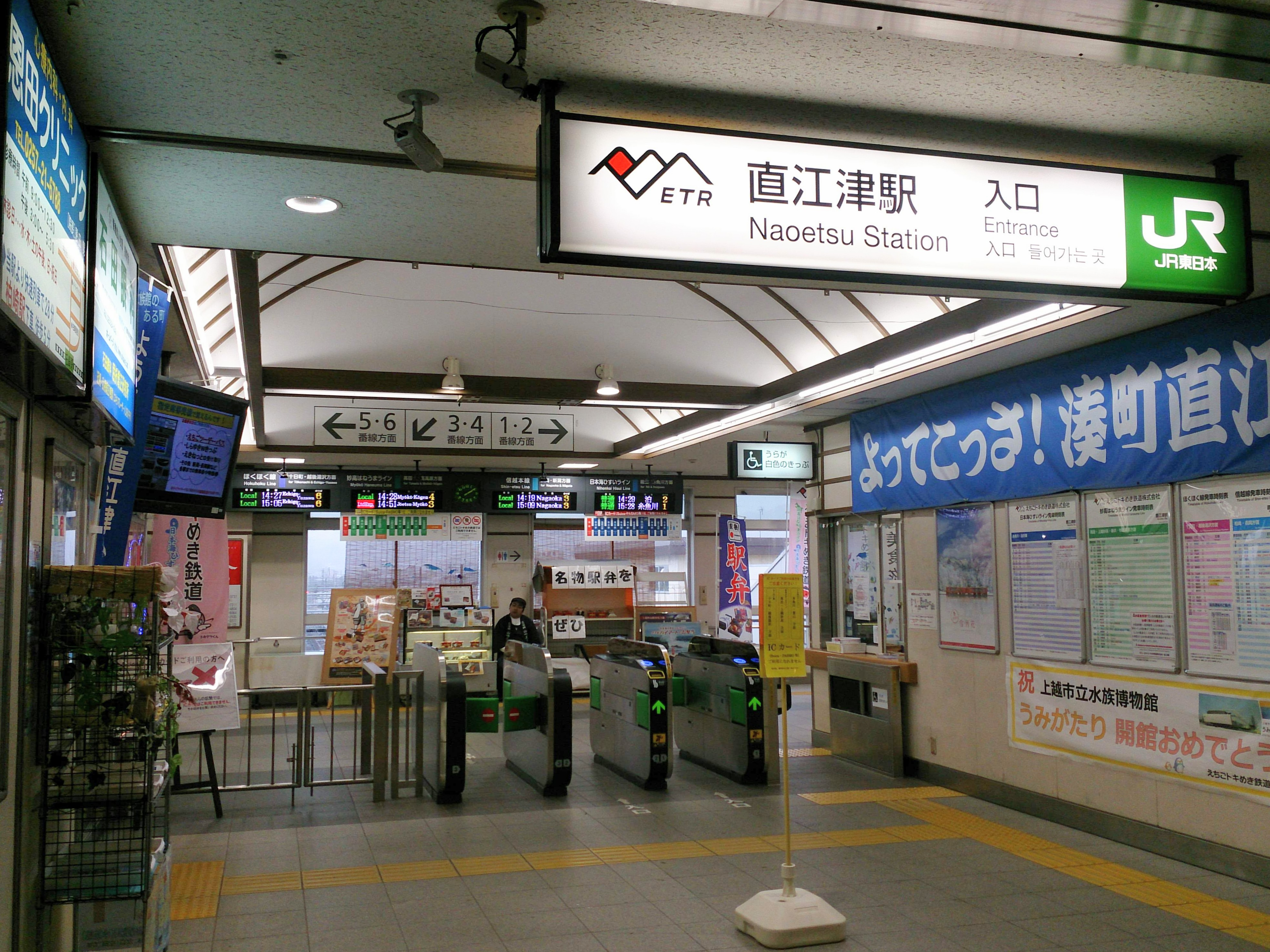
Ticket barriers

The station has three island platforms with an elevated station building. The station has a Midori no Madoguchi staffed ticket office.

=== Platforms ===
1	■ Nihonkai Hisui Line	for Itoigawa and Tomari
2-4	■ Myōkō Haneuma Line	for Arai and Myōkō-Kōgen
2-4	■ Nihonkai Hisui Line	for Itoigawa and Tomari
2-4	■ Shinetsu Main Line	for Nagaoka and Niigata
5-6	■ Myōkō Haneuma Line	for Arai, Myōkō-Kōgen
5-6	■ Nihonkai Hisui Line	for Itoigawa and Tomari
5-6	■ Shin'etsu Main Line	for Nagaoka and Niigata
5-6	■ Hokuetsu Express Hokuhoku Line	for Muikamachi and Echigo-Yuzawa

== History ==
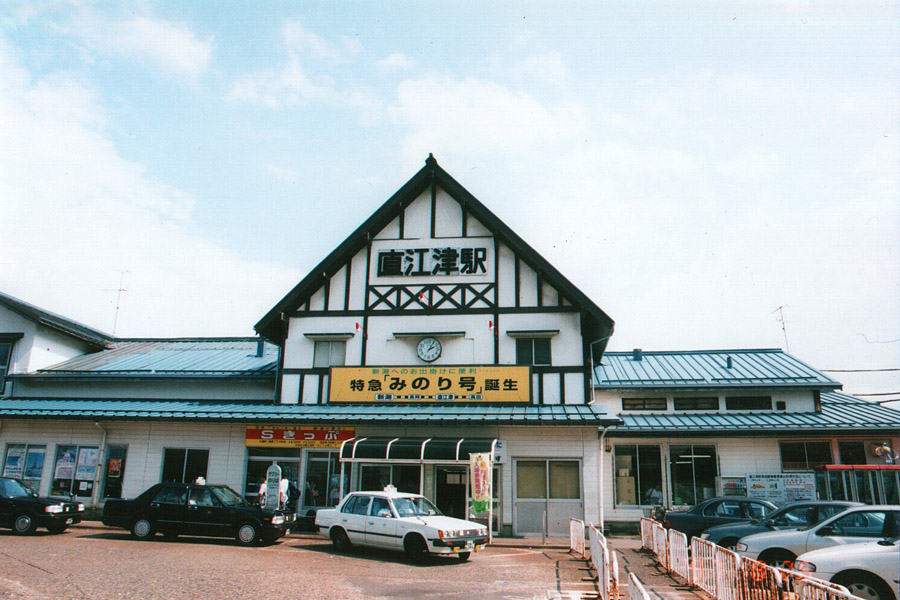
Former building, September 1997

Naoetsu Station opened on 15 August 1886. With the privatization of JNR on 1 April 1987, the station came under the joint control of JR East and JR West.

From 14 March 2015, with the opening of the Hokuriku Shinkansen extension from Nagano to Kanazawa, local passenger operations over sections of the Shinetsu Main Line and Hokuriku Main Line running roughly parallel to the new shinkansen line were reassigned to third-sector railway operating companies. From this date, Naoetsu Station became a boundary station between the Myōkō Haneuma Line (former JR East Shinetsu Main Line) and the Nihonkai Hisui Line (former JR West Hokuriku Main Line) of the Niigata-owned Echigo Tokimeki Railway Company.

== Passenger statistics ==
In fiscal 2017, the Myōkō Haneuma Line portion of the station was used by an average of 1,516 passengers daily (boarding passengers only). In fiscal 2017, the JR portion of the station was used by an average of 2,203 passengers daily (boarding passengers only).

== Surrounding area ==
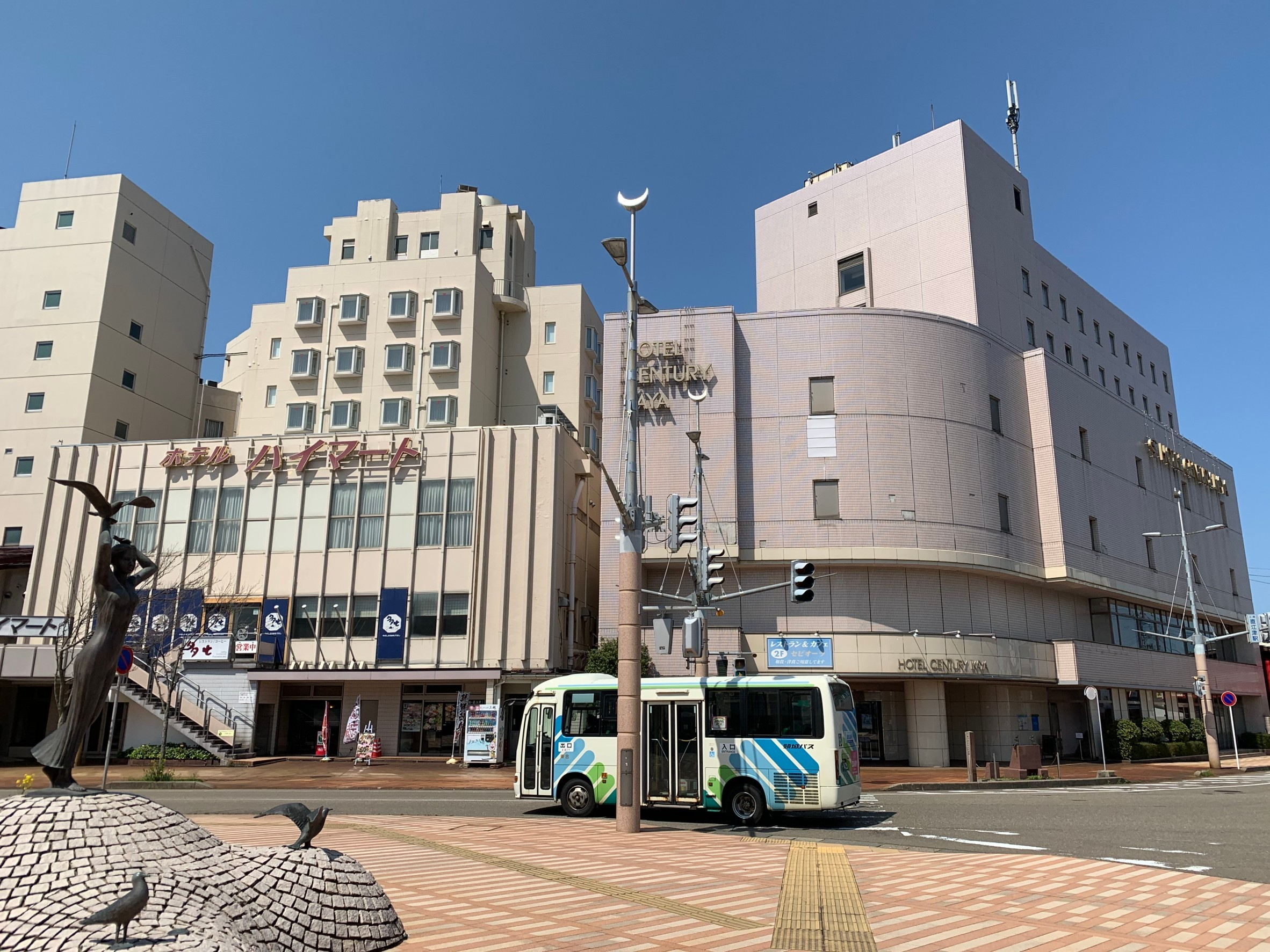
Hotels in front of the station, April 2020

  - Sado Steam Ship Ferry Terminal
