= Muikamachi Station =

Railway station in Minamiuonuma, Niigata Prefecture, Japan

Muikamachi Station 六日町駅
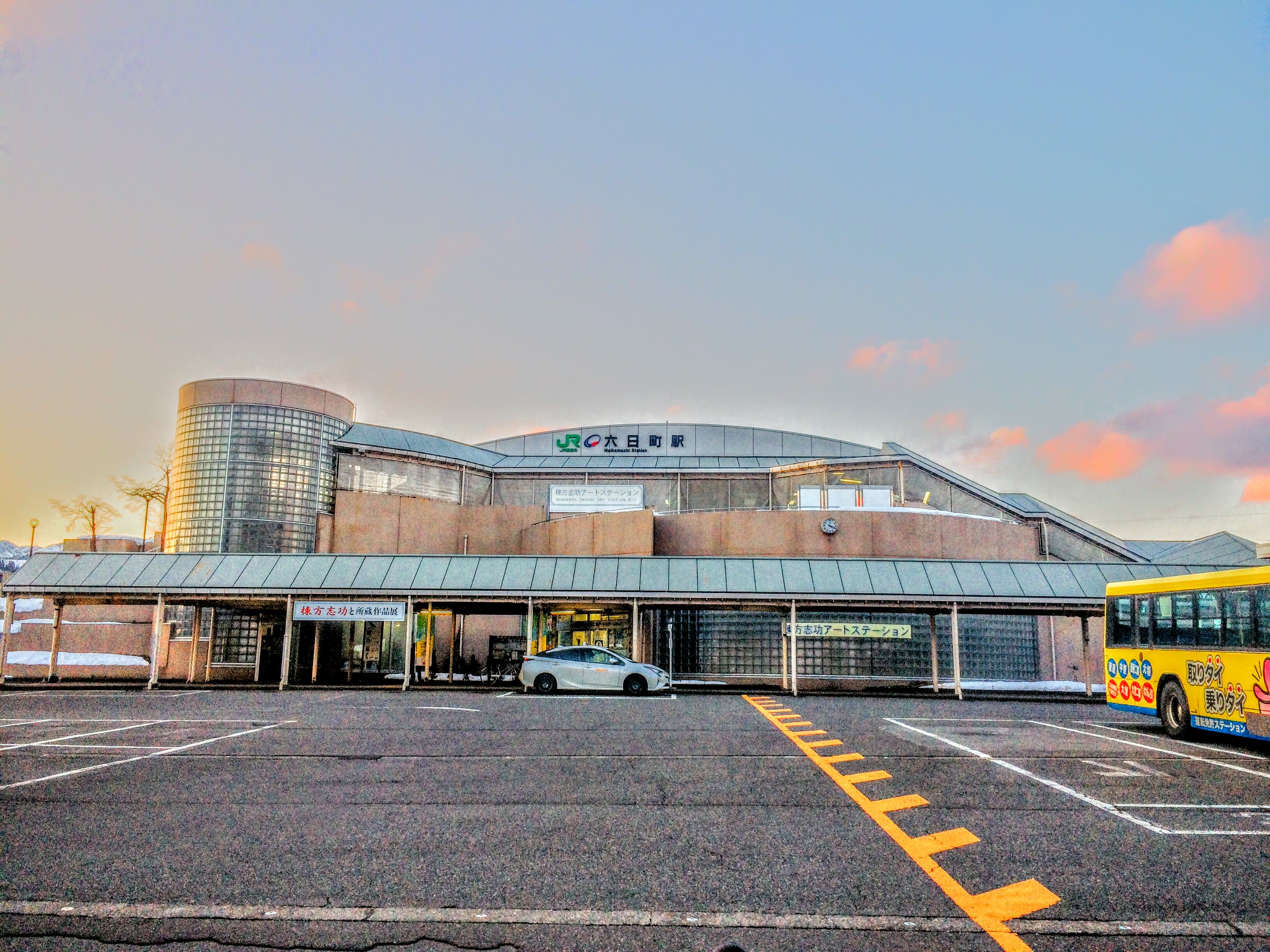
- Muikamachi Station

General information
- Location: 140-2 Muikamachi, Minamiuonuma-shi, Niigata-ken 949-6680; Japan
- Coordinates: 37.0668°N 138.8758°E
- Operator: JR East; Hokuetsu Express
- Lines: ■Jōetsu Line; ■ Hokuhoku Line
- Platforms: 1 side + 2 island platforms

Other information
- Status: Staffed (Midori no Madoguchi)
- Website: Official website

History
- Opened: 18 November 1923; 102 years ago

Passengers
- FY2017: 1794 daily

Services
Preceding station	JR East	Following station
Shiozawa towards Takasaki	Jōetsu Line	Itsukamachi towards Nagaoka
Preceding station	Hokuhoku Express	Following station
Shiozawa (limited service) towards Echigo-Yuzawa	Hokuhoku Line	Uonuma-Kyūryō towards Naoetsu
Location
- Location within Hokuhoku Line Location within Japan

Muikamachi Station (六日町駅, Muikamachi-eki) is a railway station located in the city of Minamiuonuma, Niigata, Japan, operated jointly by the East Japan Railway Company (JR East) and the third sector Hokuetsu Express.

== Lines ==
Muikamachi Station is a station on the Jōetsu Line, and is located 111.8 kilometers from the starting point of the line at Takasaki. It is also a terminal station for the Hokuhoku Line, although trains continue on to Echigo-Yuzawa via the Joetsu Line.

== Station layout ==
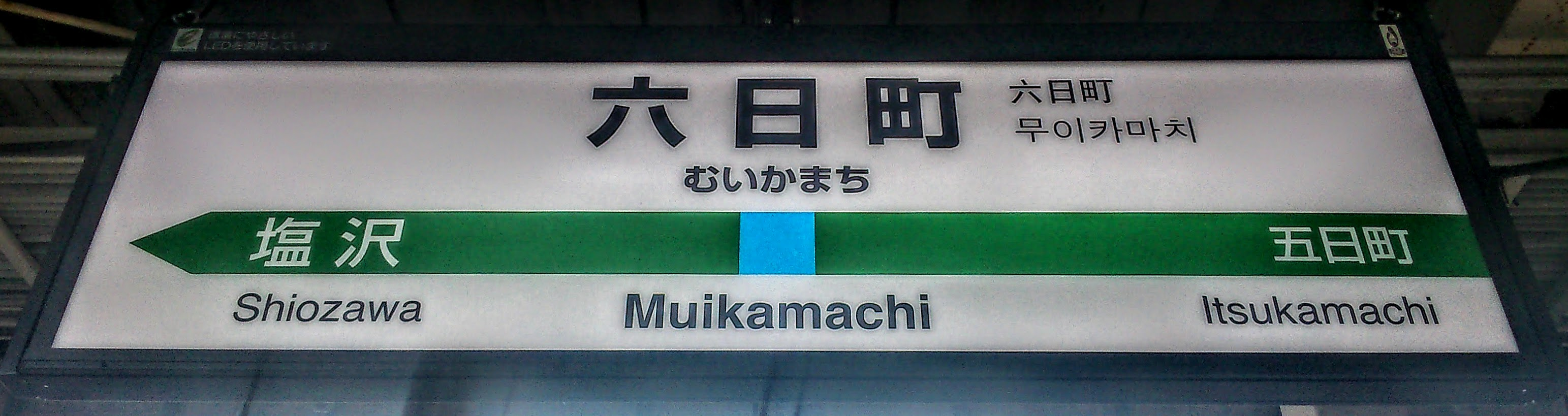
Running in board

The station has a single side platform and two island platforms serving five tracks. The station has a Midori no Madoguchi staffed ticket office.

=== Platforms ===
1	■ Jōetsu Line	for Echigo-Yuzawa and Minakami
2	■ Jōetsu Line	(siding)
3	■ Jōetsu Line	for Nagaoka and Niigata
4	■ Hokuhoku Line	for Echigo-Yuzawa
5	■ Hokuhoku Line	for Tōkamachi and Naoetsu

== History ==
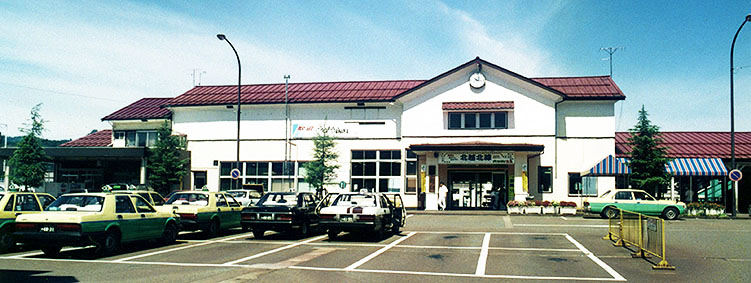
The station in 1994

Muikamachi Station opened on 18 November 1923. Upon the privatization of the Japanese National Railways (JNR) on 1 April 1987, it came under the control of JR East.

== Passenger statistics ==
In fiscal 2017, the station was used by an average of 1794 passengers daily (boarding passengers only).

== Surrounding area ==
- Muikamachi Post Office
- National Route 17

== See also ==
- List of railway stations in Japan
