= Kuwanagawa Station =

Railway station in Iiyama, Nagano Prefecture, Japan

Kuwanagawa Station 桑名川駅
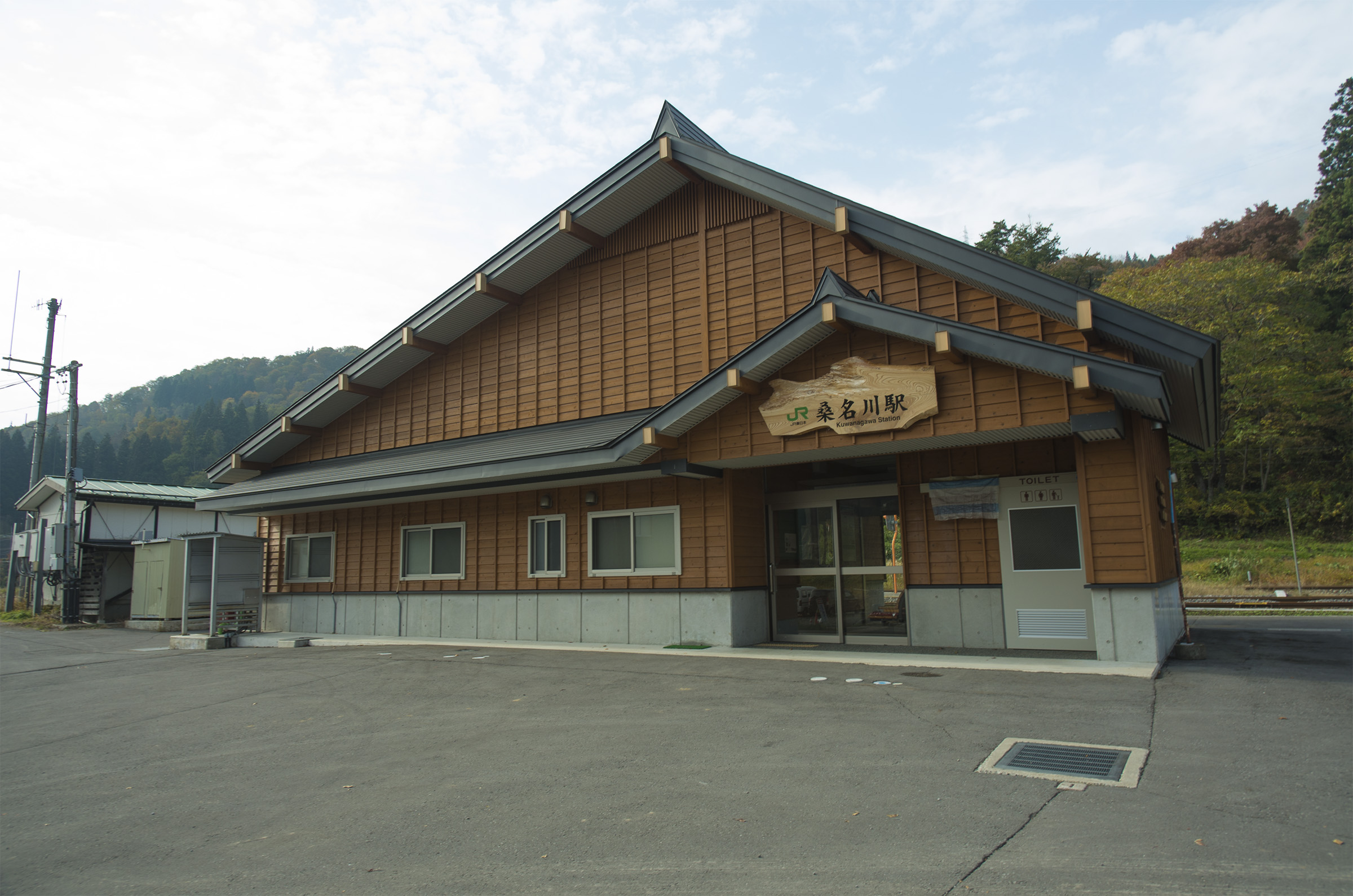
- Kuwanagawa Station, November 2013

General information
- Location: Teruoka, Iiyama-shi, Nagano-ken 389-2601; Japan
- Coordinates: 36°58′32.84″N 138°27′29.29″E
- Elevation: 303.7 metres (996 ft)
- Operator: JR East
- Line: ■ Iiyama Line
- Distance: 37.6 kilometres (23.4 mi) from Toyono
- Platforms: 1 island platform
- Tracks: 2

Other information
- Status: Unstaffed
- Website: Official website

History
- Opened: 6 July 1923

Passengers
- FY2011: 16 (daily)

Services
Preceding station	JR East	Following station
Kami-Kuwanagawa towards Nagano	Iiyama Line	Nishi-Ōtaki towards Echigo-Kawaguchi
Location
- Location within Nagano Prefecture Location within Japan

Kuwanagawa Station (桑名川駅, Kuwanagawa-eki) is a railway station in the city of Iiyama, Nagano Prefecture, Japan operated by East Japan Railway Company (JR East).

== Lines ==
Kuwanagawa Station is served by the Iiyama Line, and is 37.6 kilometers from the starting point of the line at Toyono Station.

== Station layout ==
The station consists of one ground-level island platform connected to the station building by a level crossing. The station is normally unattended, but is staffed during the winter ski season.

=== Platforms ===
1	■ Iiyama Line	for Nagano
2	■ Iiyama Line	for Mori-Miyanohara, Tōkamachi, and Echigo-Kawaguchi

== History ==
Kuwanagawa Station opened on 6 July 1923. With the privatization of Japanese National Railways (JNR) on 1 April 1987, the station came under the control of JR East. A new station building was completed in 2009.

== Surrounding area ==
- Chikuma River
- National Route 117

== See also ==
- List of railway stations in Japan
