= Kaesa Station =

Railway station in Nakano, Nagano Prefecture, Japan

Kaesa Station 替佐駅
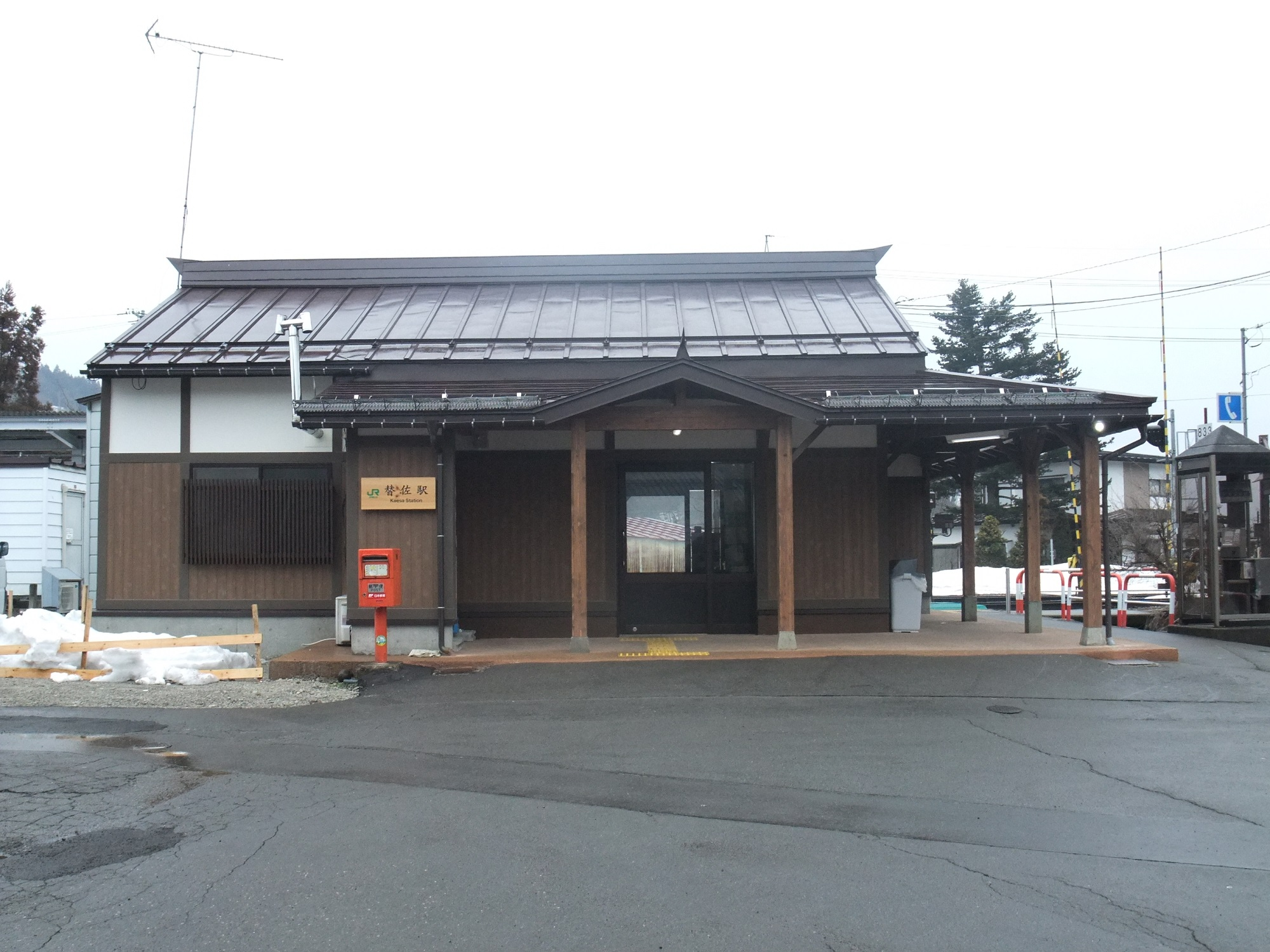
- Kaesa Station in March 2015

General information
- Location: Toyotsu, Nakano-shi, Nagano-ken 389-2101; Japan
- Coordinates: 36.7691°N 138.3234°E
- Elevation: 333.1 metres (1,093 ft)
- Operator: JR East
- Line: ■ Iiyama Line
- Distance: 8.8 kilometres (5.5 mi) from Toyono
- Platforms: 1 island platform
- Tracks: 2

Other information
- Status: Staffed
- Website: Official website

History
- Opened: 20 October 1921

Passengers
- FY2015: 121 (daily)

Services
Preceding station	JR East	Following station
Kami-Imai towards Nagano	Iiyama Line	Hachisu towards Echigo-Kawaguchi
Location
- Location within Nagano Prefecture Location within Japan

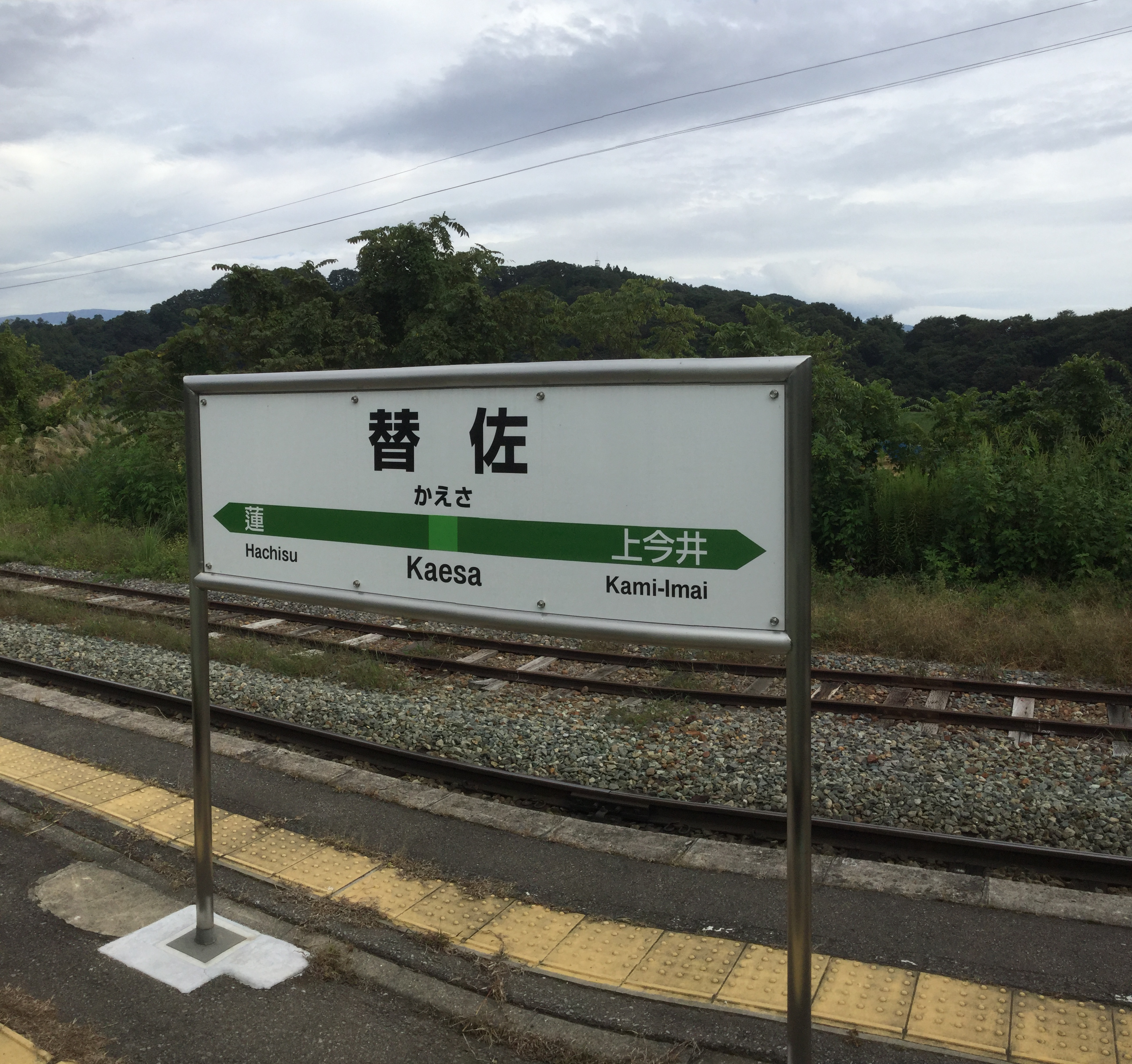
Station platform and sign, 2019

Kaesa Station (替佐駅, Kaesa-eki) is a railway station in the city of Nakano, Nagano Prefecture, Japan operated by East Japan Railway Company (JR East).

== Lines ==
Kaesa Station is served by the Iiyama Line, and is 8.8 kilometers from the starting point of the line at Toyono Station.

== Station layout ==
The station consists of one ground-level island platform serving two tracks, connected to the station building by a level crossing. The station is a Kan'i itaku station.

=== Platforms ===
1	■ Iiyama Line	for Togarinozawa-Onsen, Tōkamachi and Echigo-Kawaguchi
2	■ Iiyama Line	for Nagano

== History ==
Kaesa Station opened on 20 October 1921. With the privatization of Japanese National Railways (JNR) on 1 April 1987, the station came under the control of JR East.

== Passenger statistics ==
In fiscal 2015, the station was used by an average of 121 passengers daily (boarding passengers only).

== Surrounding area ==
- former Toyota village hall
- Chikuma River
- National Route 117

== See also ==
- List of railway stations in Japan
