= Tategahana Station =

Railway station in Nagano, Nagano Prefecture, Japan

Tategahana Station 立ヶ花駅
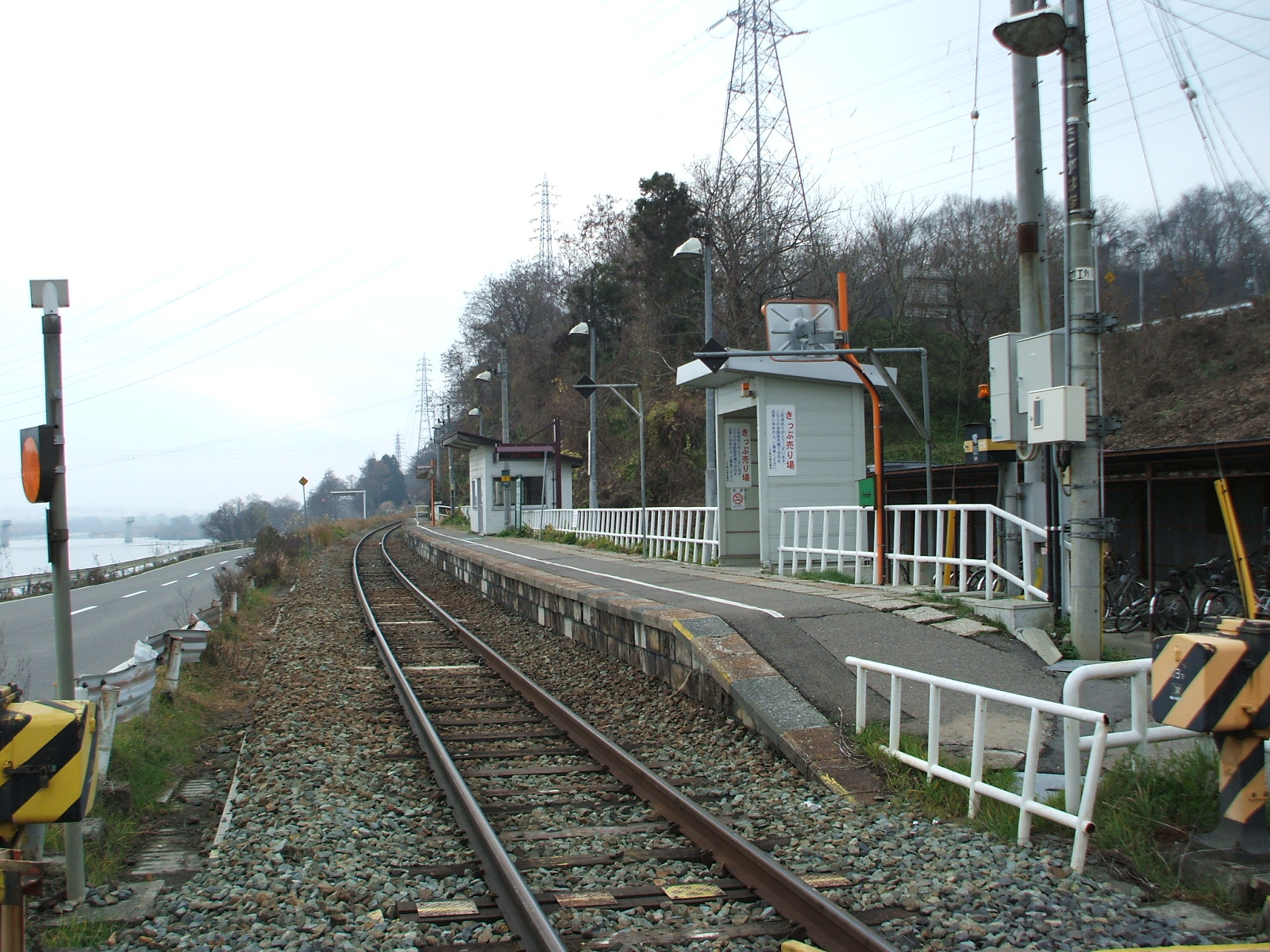
- Tategahana Station, December 2006

General information
- Location: Toyonomachi Kanisawa, Nagano-shi, Nagano-ken 389-1103; Japan
- Coordinates: 36.7312°N 138.3069°E
- Elevation: 335.8 metres (1,102 ft)
- Operator: JR East
- Line: ■ Iiyama Line
- Distance: 3.9 kilometres (2.4 mi) from Toyono
- Platforms: 1 side platform
- Tracks: 1

Other information
- Website: Official website

History
- Opened: 8 August 1958

Passengers
- FY2011: 163 (daily)

Services
Preceding station	JR East	Following station
Shinano-Asano towards Nagano	Iiyama Line	Kami-Imai towards Echigo-Kawaguchi
Location
- Location within Nagano Prefecture Location within Japan

Tategahana Station (立ヶ花駅, Tategahana-eki) is a railway station on the Iiyama Line, East Japan Railway Company (JR East), in Toyono-Kanisawa in the city of Nagano, Nagano Prefecture, Japan.

== Lines ==
Tategahana Station is served by the Iiyama Line, and is 3.9 kilometers from the starting point of the line at Toyono Station.

== Station layout ==
The station consists of one side platform serving a single bi-directional track. The station is unattended.

== History ==
Tategahana Station opened on 8 August 1958. With the privatization of Japanese National Railways (JNR) on 1 April 1987, the station came under the control of JR East. A new station building was completed in April 2004.

== Surrounding area ==
- Chikuma River
- National Route 117

== See also ==
- List of railway stations in Japan
