= Kamisakai Station =

Railway station in Iiyama, Nagano Prefecture, Japan

Kamisakai Station 上境駅
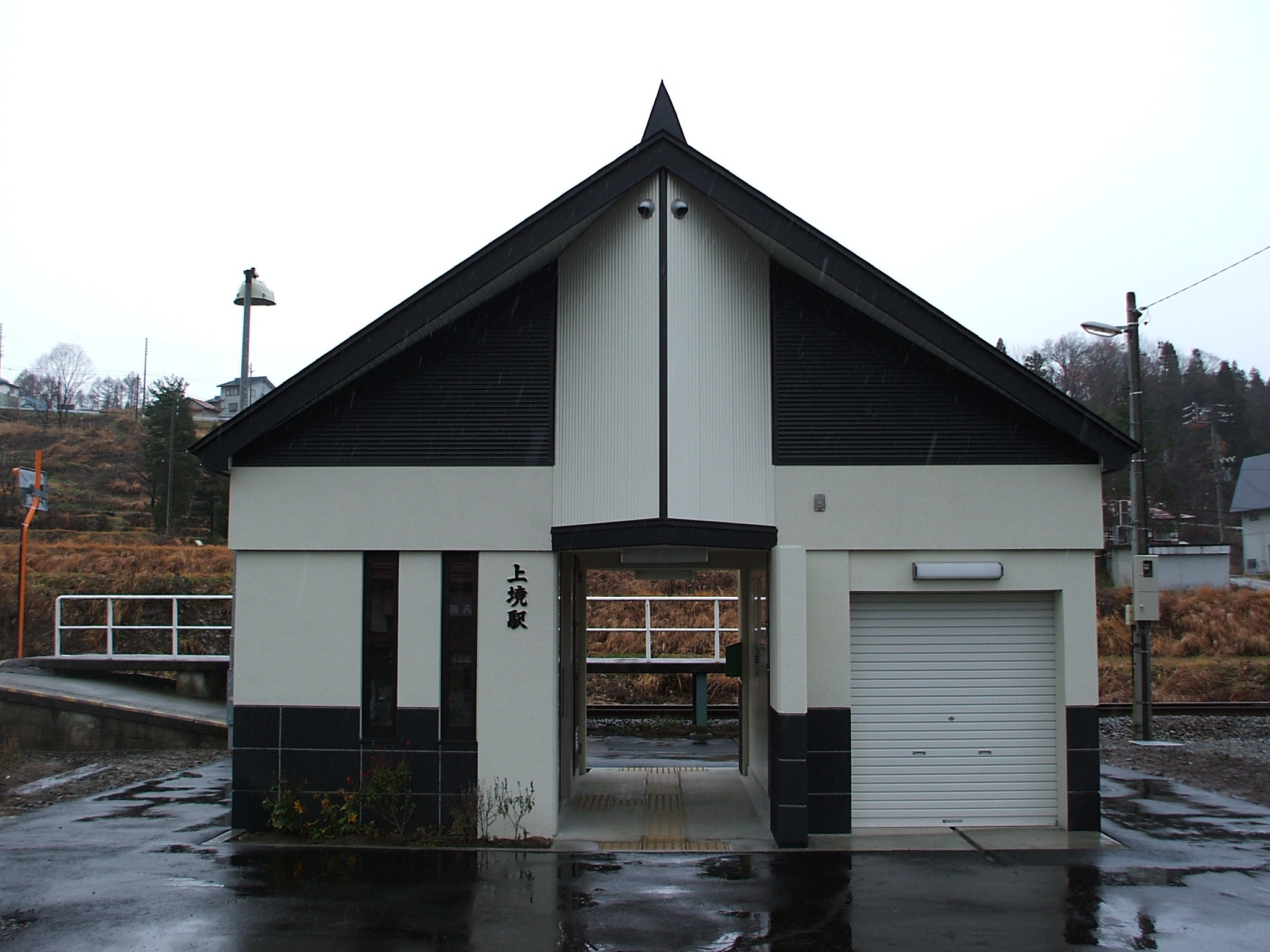
- Kamisakai Station, December 2006

General information
- Location: Ichiyama, Iiyama-shi, Nagano-ken 389-2602; Japan
- Coordinates: 36.9379°N 138.4192°E
- Elevation: 324.4 metres (1,064 ft)
- Operator: JR East
- Line: ■ Iiyama Line
- Distance: 31.3 kilometres (19.4 mi) from Toyono
- Platforms: 1 side platform
- Tracks: 1

Other information
- Status: unstaffed
- Website: Official website

History
- Opened: 6 July 1923
- Former names: Nqzawa-Onsen (to 1944)

Passengers
- FY2011: 14

Services
Preceding station	JR East	Following station
Togarinozawa-Onsen towards Nagano	Iiyama Line	Kami-Kuwanagawa towards Echigo-Kawaguchi
Location
- Location within Nagano Prefecture Location within Japan

Kamisakai Station (上境駅, Kamisakai-eki) is a railway station in the city of Iiyama, Nagano Prefecture, Japan operated by East Japan Railway Company (JR East). In older station photos, its name is hyphenated "Kami-Sakai".

== Lines ==
Kamisakai Station is served by the Iiyama Line, and is 31.3 kilometers from the starting point of the line at Toyono Station.

== Station layout ==
The station consists of one side platform serving one bi-directional track. The station is unattended.

== History ==
Kamisakai Station opened on 6 July 1923 as Nozawa Onsen Station (野沢温泉駅). It was renamed to its present name with the nationalisation of the Iiyama line on 1 June 1944. With the privatization of Japanese National Railways (JNR) on 1 April 1987, the station came under the control of JR East. A new station building was completed in December 2006.

== Surrounding area ==
- Chikuma River
- National Route 117

== See also ==
- List of railway stations in Japan
