= Shinano-Taira Station =

Railway station in Iiyama, Nagano Prefecture, Japan

Shinano-Taira Station 信濃平駅
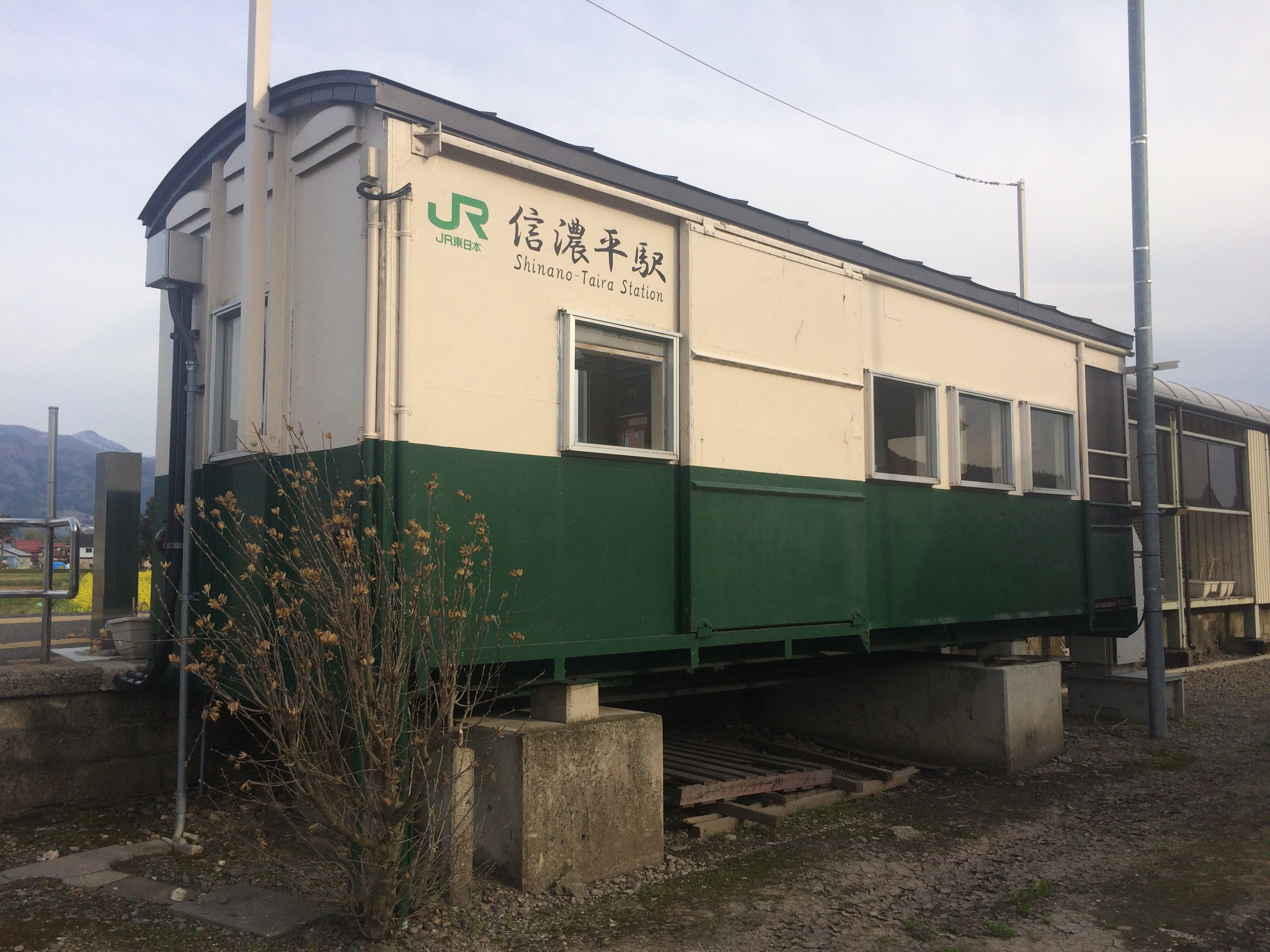
- The waiting room at Shinano-Taira Station in May 2017

General information
- Location: Tokiwa, Iiyama-shi, Nagano-ken 389-2414; Japan
- Coordinates: 36.8851°N 138.3785°E
- Elevation: 311.6 metres (1,022 ft)
- Operator: JR East
- Line: ■ Iiyama Line
- Distance: 23.8 kilometres (14.8 mi) from Toyono
- Platforms: 1 side platform
- Tracks: 1

Other information
- Status: Unstaffed
- Website: Official website

History
- Opened: 6 July 1923
- Former names: Shinshū-Taira (until 1944)

Services
Preceding station	JR East	Following station
Kita-Iiyama towards Nagano	Iiyama Line	Togarinozawa-Onsen towards Echigo-Kawaguchi
Location
- Location within Nagano Prefecture Location within Japan

Shinano-Taira Station (信濃平駅, Shinano-Taira-eki) is a railway station on the Iiyama Line in the city of Iiyama, Nagano Prefecture, Japan, operated by East Japan Railway Company (JR East).

== Lines ==
Shinano-Taira Station is served by the Iiyama Line, and is 23.8 kilometers from the starting point of the line at Toyono Station.

== Station layout ==
The station consists of one side platform serving one bi-directional track, with a converted former freight car as the station building. The station is unattended.

== History ==
The station opened on 6 July 1923 as Shinshū-Taira Station (信州平駅). It was renamed Shinano-Taira Station with the nationalisation of the Iiyama line on 1 June 1944. With the privatization of Japanese National Railways (JNR) on 1 April 1987, the station came under the control of JR East.

== Surrounding area ==
- Chikuma River
- National Route 117

== See also ==
- List of railway stations in Japan
