= Hachisu Station =

Railway station in Iiyama, Nagano Prefecture, Japan

Hachisu Station 蓮駅
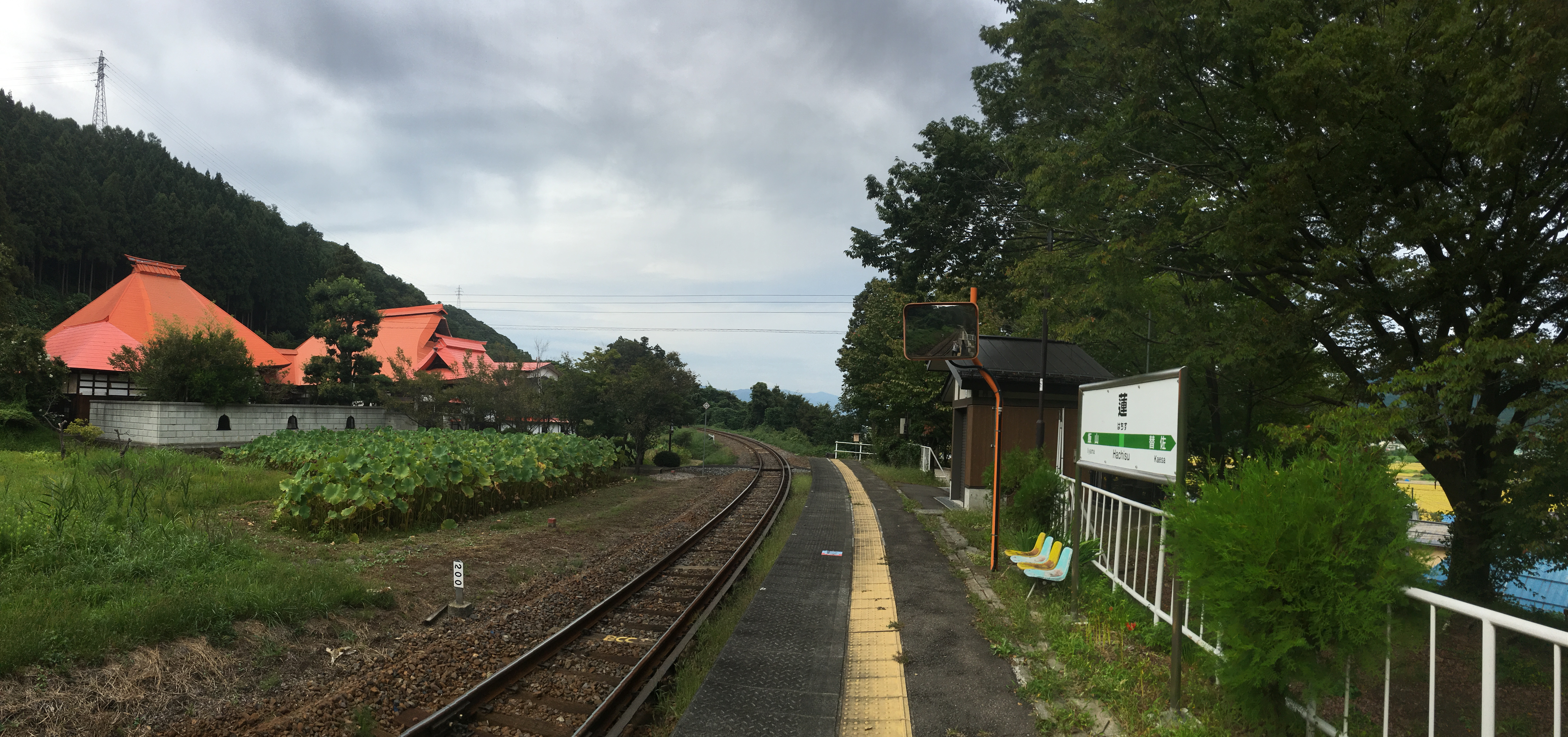
- Hachisu Station platform, September 2019

General information
- Location: Hachisu, Iiyama-shi, Nagano-ken 389-2256; Japan
- Coordinates: 36.8091°N 138.3489°E
- Elevation: 338.9 metres (1,112 ft)
- Operator: JR East
- Line: ■ Iiyama Line
- Distance: 14.6 kilometres (9.1 mi) from Toyono
- Platforms: 1 side platform
- Tracks: 1

Other information
- Status: Unstaffed
- Website: Official website

History
- Opened: 10 October 1921

Passengers
- FY2011: 66

Services
Preceding station	JR East	Following station
Kaesa towards Nagano	Iiyama Line	Iiyama towards Echigo-Kawaguchi
Location
- Location within Nagano Prefecture Location within Japan

Hachisu Station (蓮駅, Hachisu-eki) is a railway station in the city of Iiyama, Nagano Prefecture, Japan operated by East Japan Railway Company (JR East).

== Lines ==
Hachisu Station is served by the Iiyama Line, and is 14.6 kilometers from the starting point of the line at Toyono Station.

== Station layout ==
The station consists of one side platform serving one bi-directional track. The station is unattended.

== History ==
Hachisu Station opened on 20 October 1921. With the privatization of Japanese National Railways (JNR) on 1 April 1987, the station came under the control of JR East.

== Surrounding area ==
- Chikuma River
- National Route 117

== See also ==
- List of railway stations in Japan
