= Iiyama Station =

Railway station in Iiyama, Nagano Prefecture, Japan

Iiyama Station 飯山駅
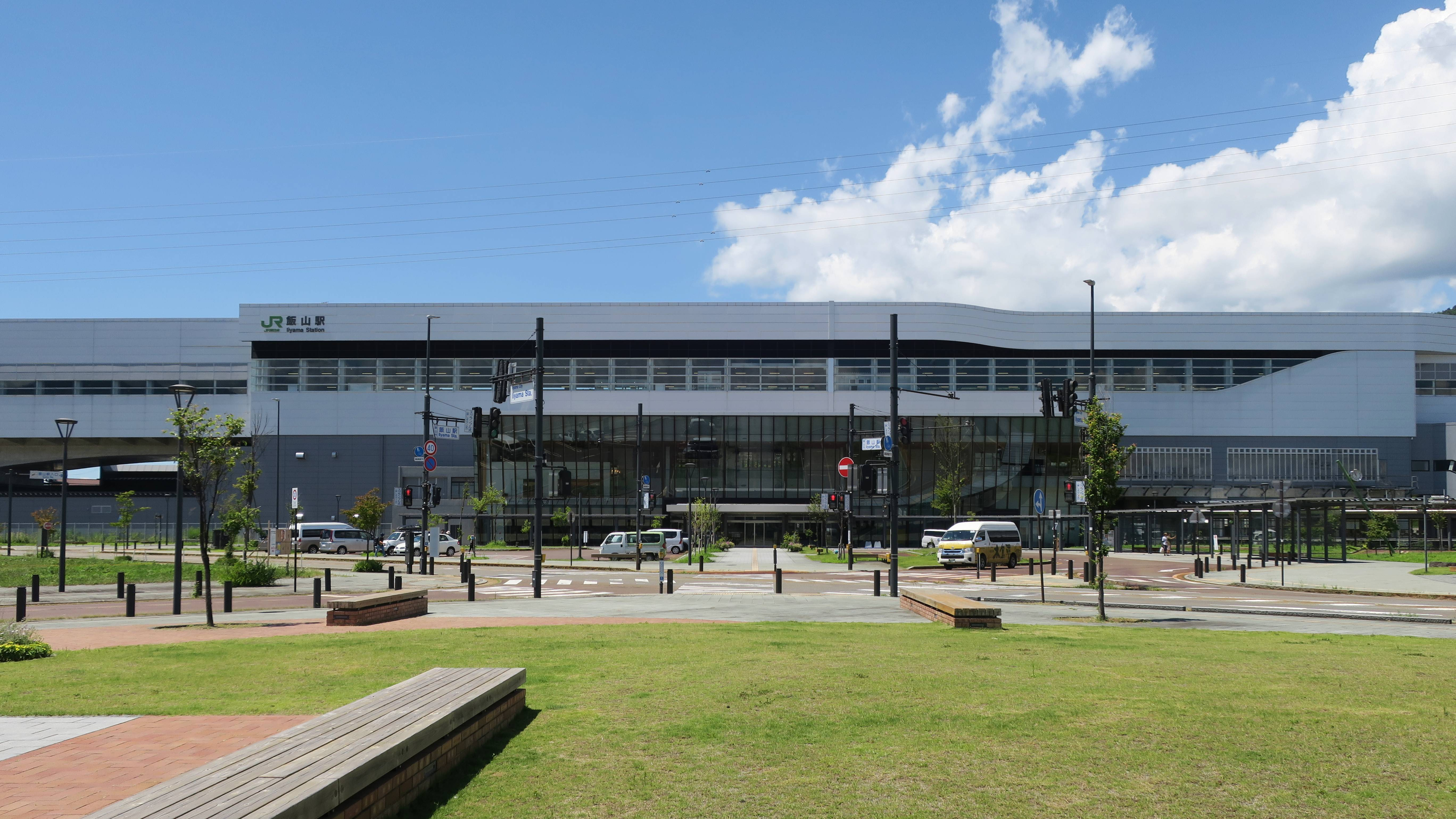
- Iiyama Station Chikumagawa exit in July 2022

General information
- Location: Iiyama, Iiyama-shi, Nagano-ken 389-225; Japan
- Coordinates: 36.8477°N 138.3592°E
- Operator: JR East
- Lines: Hokuriku Shinkansen; Iiyama Line
- Platforms: 1 island platform + 2 side platforms
- Tracks: 4
- Connections: Bus stop

Other information
- Status: Staffed ("Midori no Madoguchi")
- Website: Official website

History
- Opened: 20 October 1921; 104 years ago

Passengers
- FY2021: 719 daily

Services
Preceding station	JR East	Following station
Jōetsumyōkō Terminus	Hokuriku Shinkansen Hakutaka	Nagano towards Tokyo
Hachisu towards Nagano	Iiyama Line	Kita-Iiyama towards Echigo-Kawaguchi
Location
- Location within Nagano Prefecture Location within Japan

Iiyama Station (飯山駅, Iiyama-eki) is a railway station on the Iiyama Line in the city of Iiyama, Nagano Prefecture, Japan, operated by East Japan Railway Company (JR East). Since 14 March 2015, it is also a stop on the high-speed Hokuriku Shinkansen line from Tokyo to Kanazawa.

== Lines ==
Iiyama Station is served by the Iiyama Line, and is 19.2 kilometers from the starting point of the line at Toyono Station. From 14 March 2015, it also became a stop on the high-speed Hokuriku Shinkansen line from Tokyo to Kanazawa, located 147.3 km from the official starting point of the line at Takasaki. Iiyama is served by Hakutaka services operating between Tokyo and Kanazawa, although not all trains will stop at Iiyama.

== Station layout ==
The new station structure built to coincide with the opening of the Hokuriku Shinkansen extension lies approximately 300 m (980 ft) to the south of the site of the original station. The elevated Shinkansen platforms cross the ground-level Iiyama Line platforms at an angle. The station has a "Midori no Madoguchi" staffed ticket office.

=== Platforms ===
The Iiyama Line is served by a ground-level island platform with tracks on either side.

1	■ Iiyama Line	for Toyono and Nagano
2	■ Iiyama Line	for Togarinozawa-Onsen, Tōkamachi and Echigo-Kawaguchi

The Shinkansen platforms consist of two 312 m long side platforms serving two tracks. The platforms are fitted with chest-high platform edge doors.

11	■ Hokuriku Shinkansen	for Nagano, Takasaki and Tokyo
12	■ Hokuriku Shinkansen	for Toyama, Kanazawa and Tsuruga

== History ==
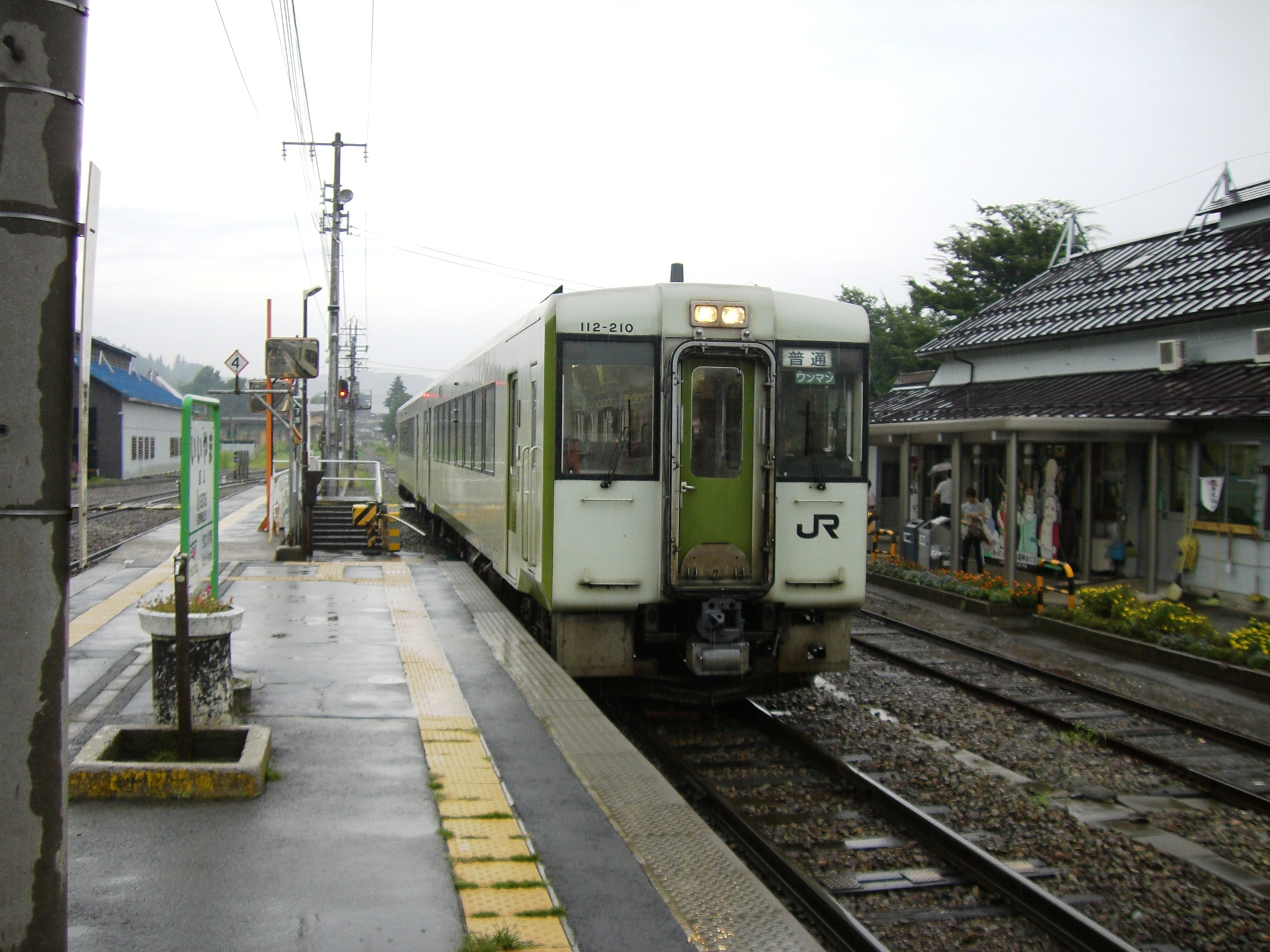
The original Iiyama Line station and platform in August 2007

Iiyama Station opened on 20 October 1921. With the privatization of JNR on 1 April 1987, the station came under the control of JR East.

The new station structure opened on 9 November 2014.

== Passenger statistics ==
In fiscal 2021, the station was used by an average of 719 passengers daily (boarding passengers only). Passenger figures for previous years are as shown below.

Fiscal year	Daily average
2000	723
2005	636
2010	572
2015	1012
2020	635

== Surrounding area ==
- Iiyama City Hall
- National Route 117
- Chikuma River

== See also ==
- List of railway stations in Japan
