= Kita-Iiyama Station =

Railway station in Iiyama, Nagano Prefecture, Japan

Kita-Iiyama Station 北飯山駅
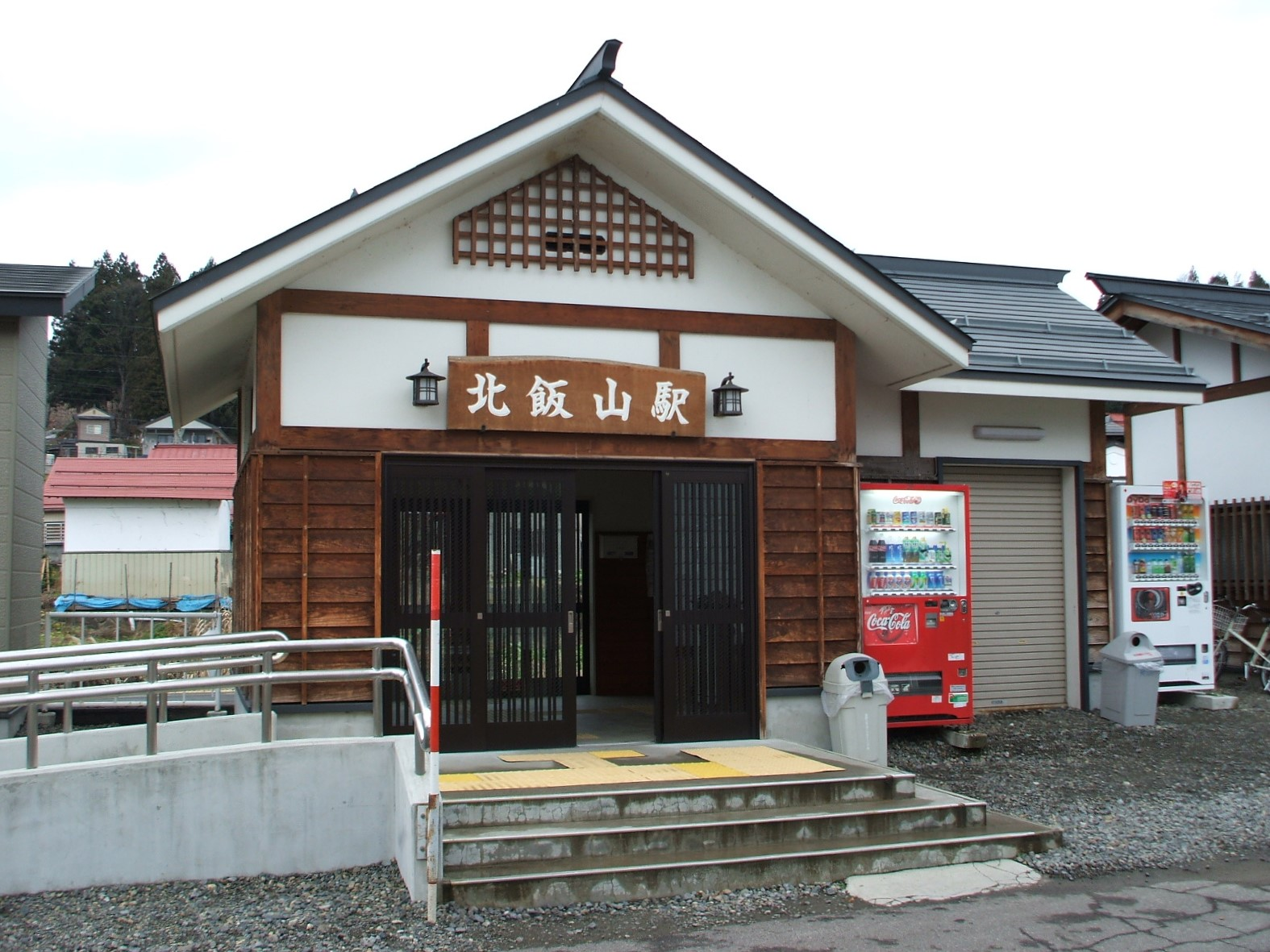
- Kita-Iiyama Station in December 2006

General information
- Location: Iiyama, Iiyama-shi, Nagano-ken 389-2253; Japan
- Coordinates: 36.8588°N 138.3640°E
- Elevation: 317.0 metres (1,040.0 ft)
- Operator: JR East
- Line: ■ Iiyama Line
- Distance: 20.5 kilometres (12.7 mi) from Toyono
- Platforms: 1 side platform
- Tracks: 1

Other information
- Status: Unstaffed
- Website: Official website

History
- Opened: 6 July 1923

Passengers
- FY2011: 254

Services
Preceding station	JR East	Following station
Iiyama towards Nagano	Iiyama Line	Shinano-Taira towards Echigo-Kawaguchi
Location
- Location within Nagano Prefecture Location within Japan

Kita-Iiyama Station (北飯山駅, Kita-Iiyama-eki) is a railway station in the city of Iiyama, Nagano Prefecture, Japan operated by East Japan Railway Company (JR East).

== Lines ==
Kita-Iiyama Station is served by the Iiyama Line, and is 20.5 kilometers from the starting point of the line at Toyono Station.

== Station layout ==
The station consists of one side platform serving one bi-directional track. The station is unattended.

== History ==
Kita-Iiyama Station opened on 6 July 1923. With the privatization of Japanese National Railways (JNR) on 1 April 1987, the station came under the control of JR East.

== Surrounding area ==
- Chikuma River
- National Route 117
- National Route 292

== See also ==
- List of railway stations in Japan
