= Mori-Miyanohara Station =

Railway station in Sakae, Nagano Prefecture, Japan

Mori-Miyanohara Station 森宮野原駅
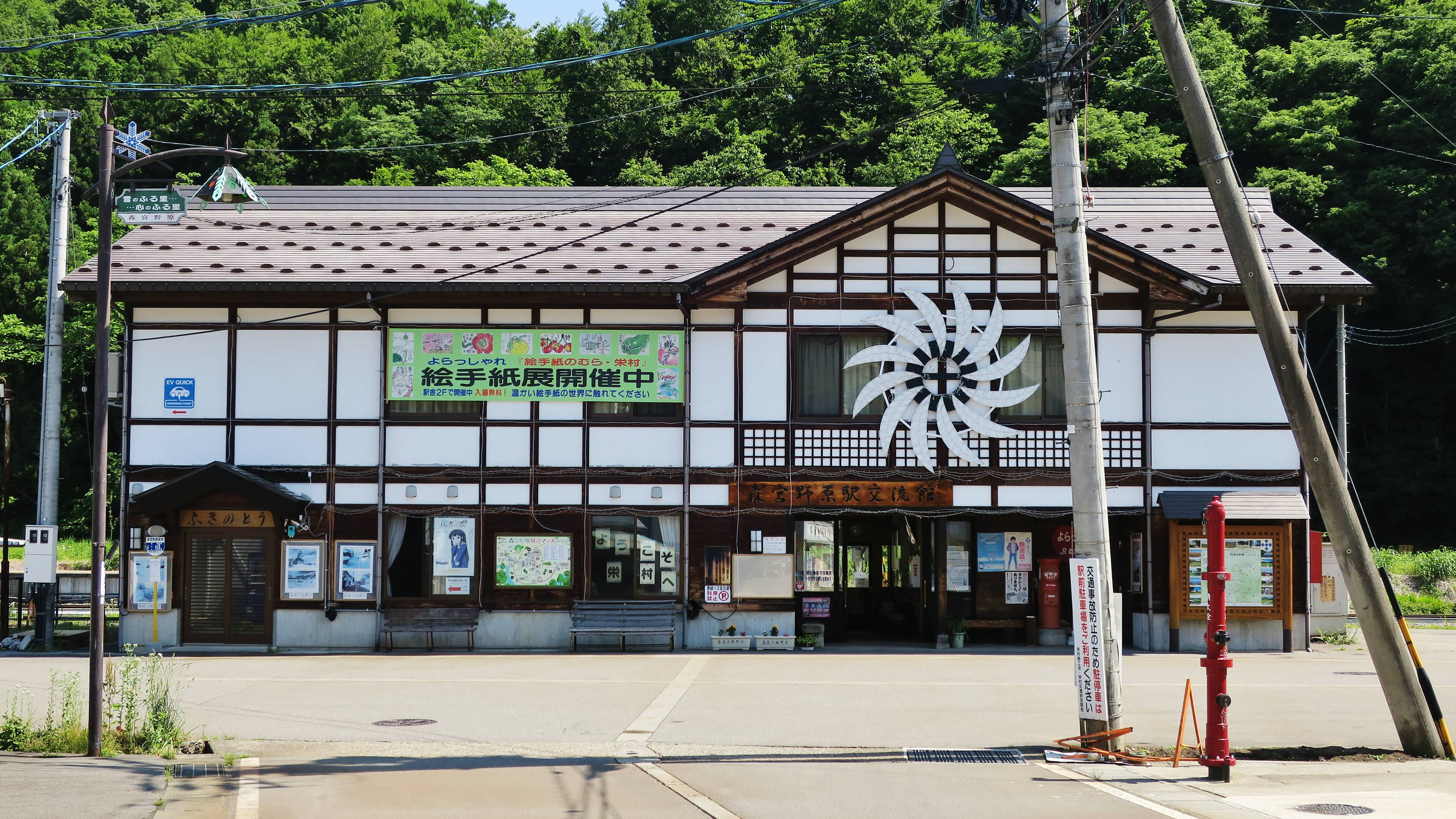
- Mori-Miyanohara Station. June 2018

General information
- Location: Hokushin, Sakae-mura, Shimominochi-gun, Nagano-ken 389-2702; Japan
- Coordinates: 36.9891°N 138.5780°E
- Elevation: 289.9 metres (951 ft)
- Operator: JR East
- Line: ■ Iiyama Line
- Distance: 49.7 kilometres (30.9 mi) from Toyono
- Platforms: 1 island platform
- Tracks: 2

Other information
- Website: Official website

History
- Opened: 19 November 1925

Passengers
- FY2017: 39 (daily)

Services
| Preceding station | JR East | Following station |
|---|---|---|
| Yokokura towards Nagano | Iiyama Line | Ashidaki towards Echigo-Kawaguchi |
Location
- Location within Nagano Prefecture Location within Japan

Mori-Miyanohara Station (森宮野原駅, Mori-Miyanohara-eki) is a railway station on the Iiyama Line, East Japan Railway Company (JR East), in Hokushin in the village of Sakae, Shimominochi District, Nagano Prefecture, Japan.

== Lines ==
Mori-Miyanohara Station is served by the Iiyama Line, and is 49.7 kilometers from the starting point of the line at Toyono Station.

== Station layout ==
The station consists of one island platform connected to the station building by a level crossing. The station is staffed.

=== Platforms ===
| 1 | ■ Iiyama Line | for Tōkamachi and Echigo-Kawaguchi |
| 2 | ■ Iiyama Line | for Togari-Nozawaonsen and Iiyama |

== History ==
Mori-Miyanohara Station opened on 19 November 1925. With the privatization of Japanese National Railways (JNR) on 1 April 1987, the station came under the control of JR East. A new station building was completed in April 2004.

== Passenger statistics ==
In fiscal 2017, the station was used by an average of 37 passengers daily (boarding passengers only).

== Surrounding area ==
- Sakae village hall
- National Route 117

== See also ==
- List of railway stations in Japan
