= Uonuma-Nakajō Station =

Railway station in Tōkamachi, Niigata Prefecture, Japan

Uonuma-Nakajō Station 魚沼中条駅
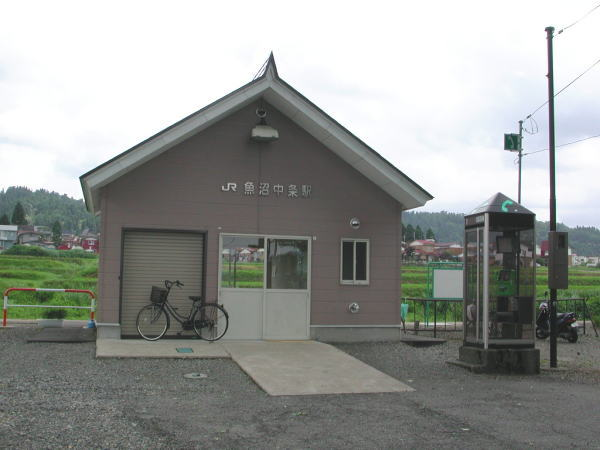
- Uonuma-Nakajō Station in July 2004

General information
- Location: Nakajō, Tōkamachi-shi, Niigata-ken 949-8407; Japan
- Coordinates: 37.1594°N 138.7724°E
- Operator: JR East
- Line: ■ Iiyama Line
- Distance: 78.4 kilometres (48.7 mi) from Toyono
- Platforms: 1 side platform

Other information
- Status: unstaffed
- Website: www.jreast.co.jp/estation/station/info.aspx?StationCd=207

History
- Opened: 15 November 1927

Services
Preceding station	JR East	Following station
Tōkamachi towards Nagano	Iiyama Line	Gejō towards Echigo-Kawaguchi
Location
- Location within Japan

Uonuma-Nakajō Station (魚沼中条駅, Uonuma-Nakajō-eki) is a railway station in the city of Tōkamachi, Niigata, Japan operated by East Japan Railway Company (JR East).

== Lines ==
Uonuma-Nakajō Station is served by the Iiyama Line, and is 78.4 kilometers from the starting point of the line at Toyono Station.

== Station layout ==
The station consists of a single side platform serving one bi-directional track. The station is unattended.

== History ==
Uonuma-Nakajō Station opened on 15 November 1927. With the privatization of Japanese National Railways (JNR) on 1 April 1987, the station came under the control of JR East.

== Surrounding area ==
- National Route 117
- Uonuma-Nakajō Post Office
- Nakajō Middle School

== See also ==
- List of railway stations in Japan
