= Echigo-Iwasawa Station =

Railway station in Ojiya, Niigata Prefecture, Japan

Echigo-Iwasawa Station 越後岩沢駅
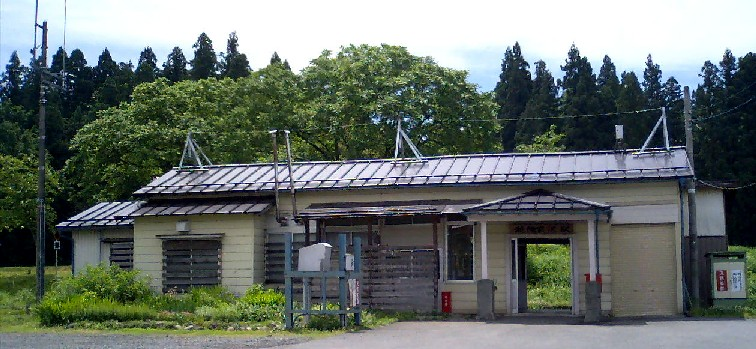
- Echigo-Iwasawa Station, June 2006

General information
- Location: Iwasawa, Ojiya-shi, Niigata-ken 949-8724; Japan
- Coordinates: 37.2405°N 138.7973°E
- Operator: JR East
- Line: ■ Iiyama Line
- Distance: 88.1 kilometres (54.7 mi) from Toyono
- Platforms: 1 side platform

Other information
- Status: Unstaffed
- Website: www.jreast.co.jp/estation/station/info.aspx?StationCd=265

History
- Opened: 15 June 1927

Services
Preceding station	JR East	Following station
Gejō towards Nagano	Iiyama Line	Uchigamaki towards Echigo-Kawaguchi
Location
- Location within Japan

Echigo-Iwasawa Station (越後岩沢駅, Echigo-Iwasawa-eki) is a railway station in the city of Ojiya, Niigata, Japan, operated by East Japan Railway Company (JR East).

== Lines ==
Echigo-Iwasawa Station is served by the Iiyama Line, and is 88.1 kilometers from the starting point of the line at Toyono Station.

== Station layout ==
The station consists of one ground-level side platform. The station formerly also had an island platform, which remains in place but is not in use. The station is unattended.

== History ==
Echigo-Iwasawa Station opened on 15 June 1927. With the privatization of Japanese National Railways (JNR) on 1 April 1987, the station came under the control of JR East.

== Surrounding area ==
- National Route 117

== See also ==
- List of railway stations in Japan
