= Nishi-Ōtaki Station =

Railway station in Iiyama, Nagano Prefecture, Japan

Nishi-Ōtaki Station 西大滝駅
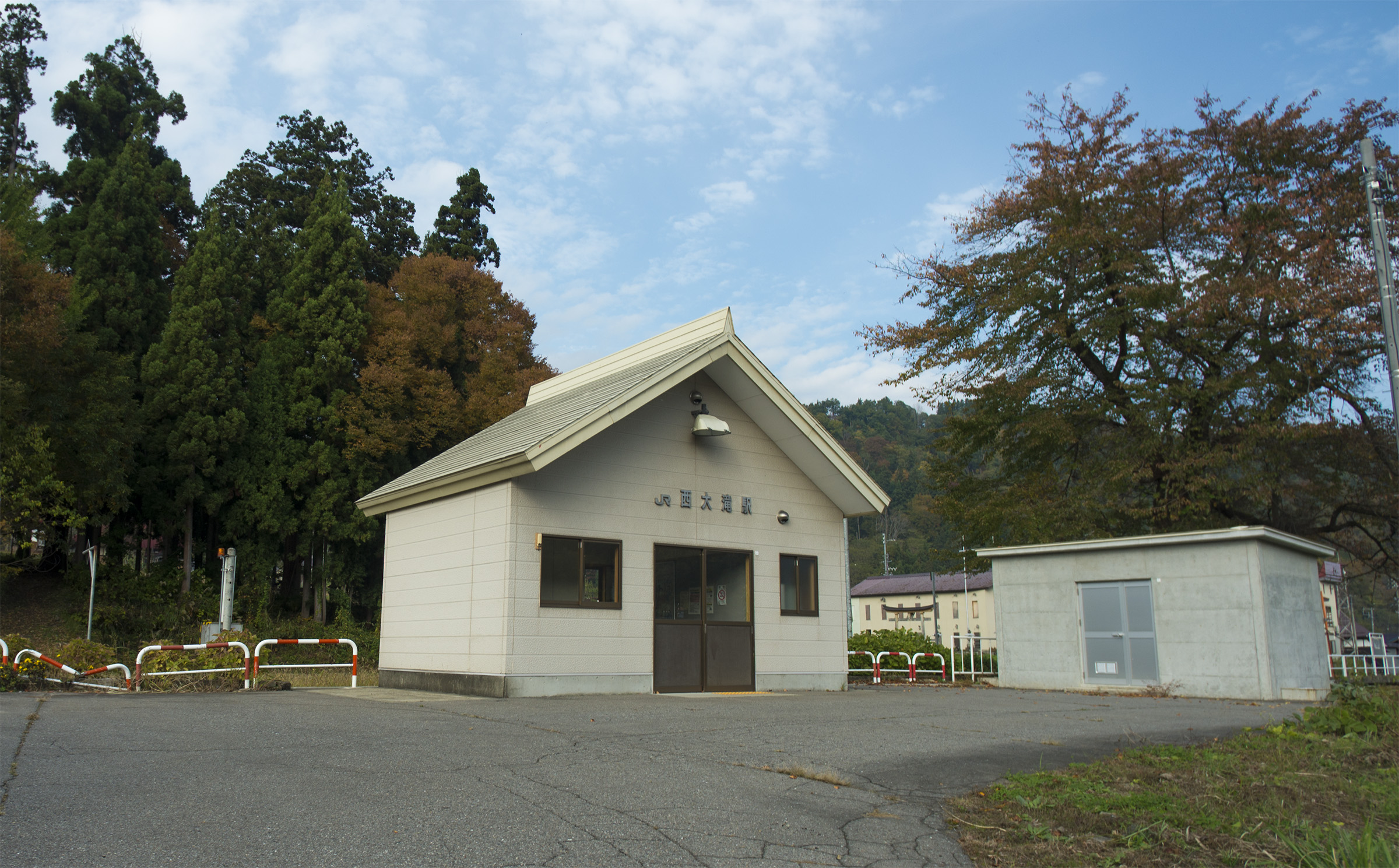
- Nishi-Ōtaki Station, November 2013

General information
- Location: Teruoka, Iiyama-shi, Nagano-ken 389-2601; Japan
- Coordinates: 36°58′44.67″N 138°28′50.68″E
- Elevation: 313.3 metres (1,028 ft)
- Operator: JR East
- Line: ■ Iiyama Line
- Distance: 39.7 kilometres (24.7 mi) from Toyono
- Platforms: 1 side platform
- Tracks: 1

Other information
- Status: Unstaffed
- Website: Official website

History
- Opened: 1 December 1923

Passengers
- FY2011: 7 (daily)

Services
Preceding station	JR East	Following station
Kuwanagawa towards Nagano	Iiyama Line	Shinano-Shiratori towards Echigo-Kawaguchi
Location
- Location within Nagano Prefecture Location within Japan

Nishi-Ōtaki Station (西大滝駅, Nishi-Ōtaki-eki) is a railway station in the city of Iiyama, Nagano Prefecture, Japan operated by East Japan Railway Company (JR East).

== Lines ==
Nishi-Ōtaki Station is served by the Iiyama Line, and is 39.7 kilometers from the starting point of the line at Toyono Station.

== Station layout ==
The station consists of one ground-level side platform serving a single bi-directional track. The station is unattended.

== History ==
Nishi-Ōtaki Station opened on 1 December 1923. With the privatization of Japanese National Railways (JNR) on 1 April 1987, the station came under the control of JR East. A new station building was completed in 1997.

== Surrounding area ==
- Chikuma River
- National Route 117
- Nishiotaki Dam

== See also ==
- List of railway stations in Japan
