= Gejō Station =

Railway station in Tōkamachi, Niigata Prefecture, Japan

Gejō Station 下条駅
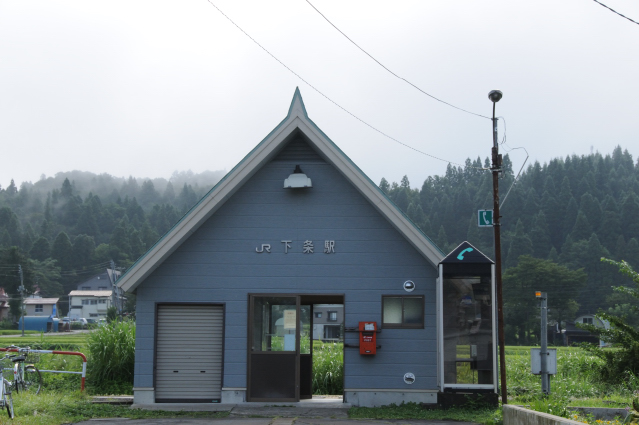
- Gejō Station in August 2008

General information
- Location: Gejō, Tōkamachi-shi, Niigata-ken 949-8603; Japan
- Coordinates: 37.1983°N 138.7801°E
- Operator: JR East
- Line: ■ Iiyama Line
- Distance: 82.8 kilometres (51.4 mi) from Toyono
- Platforms: 1 side platform

Other information
- Status: unstaffed
- Website: www.jreast.co.jp/estation/station/info.aspx?StationCd=651

History
- Opened: 25 November 1927

Services
Preceding station	JR East	Following station
Uonuma-Nakajō towards Nagano	Iiyama Line	Echigo-Iwasawa towards Echigo-Kawaguchi
Location
- Location within Japan

Gejō Station (下条駅, Gejō-eki) is a railway station in the city of Tōkamachi, Niigata, Japan operated by East Japan Railway Company (JR East).

== Lines ==
Gejō Station is served by the Iiyama Line, and is 82.8 kilometers from the starting point of the line at Toyono Station.

== Station layout ==
The station consists of a single side platform serving one bi-directional track. The station is unattended.

== History ==
Gejō Station opened on 25 November 1927. With the privatization of Japanese National Railways (JNR) on 1 April 1987, the station came under the control of JR East.

== Surrounding area ==
- National Route 117
- Gejō Post Office
- Gejō Middle School
- Gejō Elementary School

== See also ==
- List of railway stations in Japan
