= Kami-Kuwanagawa Station =

Railway station in Iiyama, Nagano Prefecture, Japan

Kami-Kuwanagawa Station 上桑名川駅
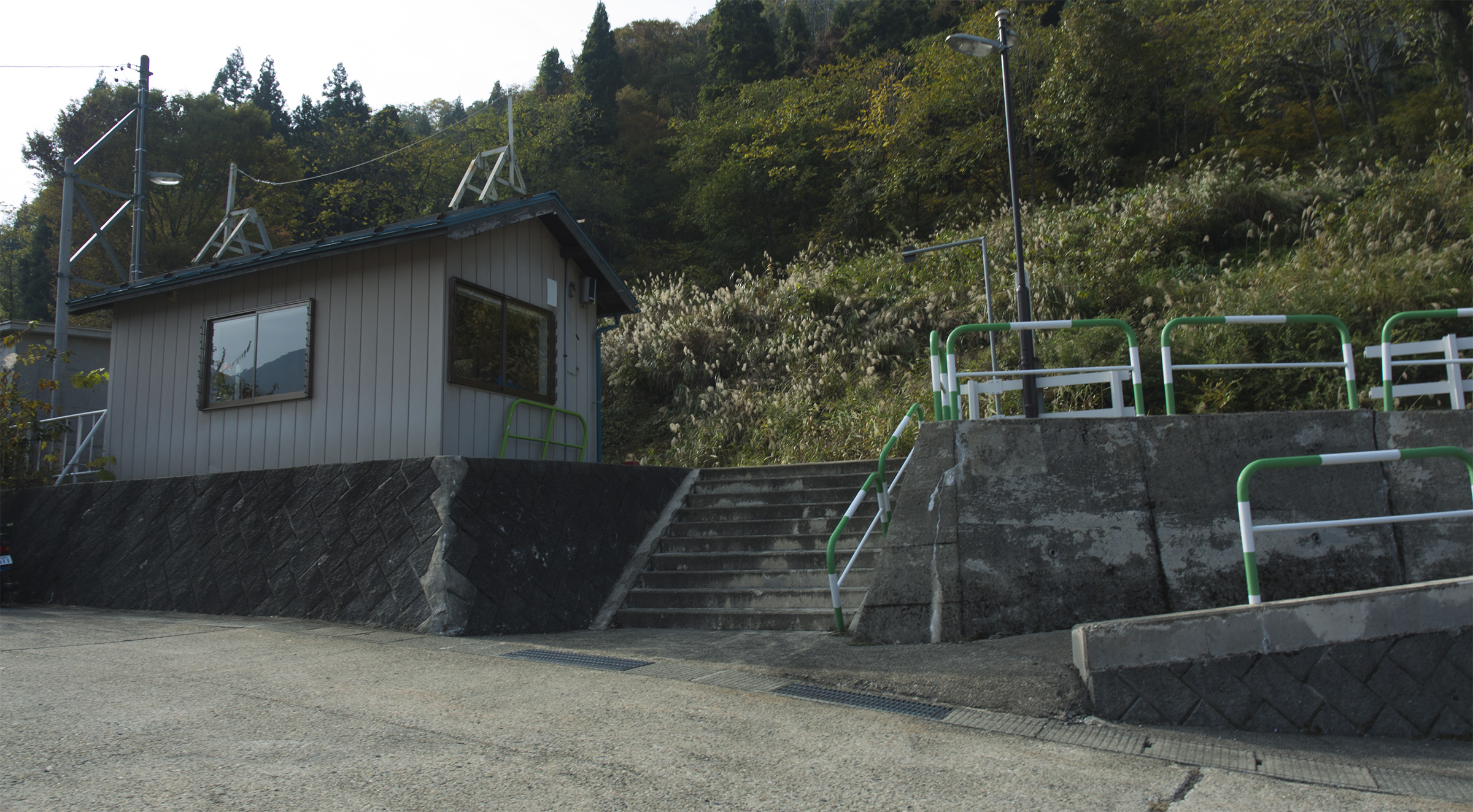
- Kami-Kuwanagawa Station, November 2013

General information
- Location: Teruoka, Iiyama-shi, Nagano-ken 389-2601; Japan
- Coordinates: 36.9624°N 138.4409°E
- Elevation: 317.7 metres (1,042 ft)
- Operator: JR East
- Line: ■ Iiyama Line
- Distance: 35.4 kilometres (22.0 mi) from Toyono
- Platforms: 1 side platform
- Tracks: 1

Other information
- Status: Unstaffed
- Website: Official website

History
- Opened: 16 September 1931

Passengers
- FY2011: 14

Services
Preceding station	JR East	Following station
Kamisakai towards Nagano	Iiyama Line	Kuwanagawa towards Echigo-Kawaguchi
Location
- Location within Nagano Prefecture Location within Japan

Kami-Kuwanagawa Station (上桑名川駅, Kami-Kuwanagawa-eki) is a railway station in the city of Iiyama, Nagano Prefecture, Japan operated by the East Japan Railway Company (JR East).

== Lines ==
Kami-Kuwanagawa Station is served by trains on the Iiyama Line, and is 35.4 kilometers from the starting point of the line at Toyono Station.

== Station layout ==
The station consists of one side platform serving one bi-directional track built on an embankment. There is no station building, but only a shelter on the platform. The station is unattended.

== History ==
Kami Kuwanagawa Station opened on 16 September 1931. With the privatization of Japanese National Railways (JNR) on 1 April 1987, the station came under the control of JR East.

== Surrounding area ==
- Chikuma River

== See also ==
- List of railway stations in Japan
