= Ashidaki Station =

Railway station in Tsunan, Niigata Prefecture, Japan

Ashidaki Station 足滝駅
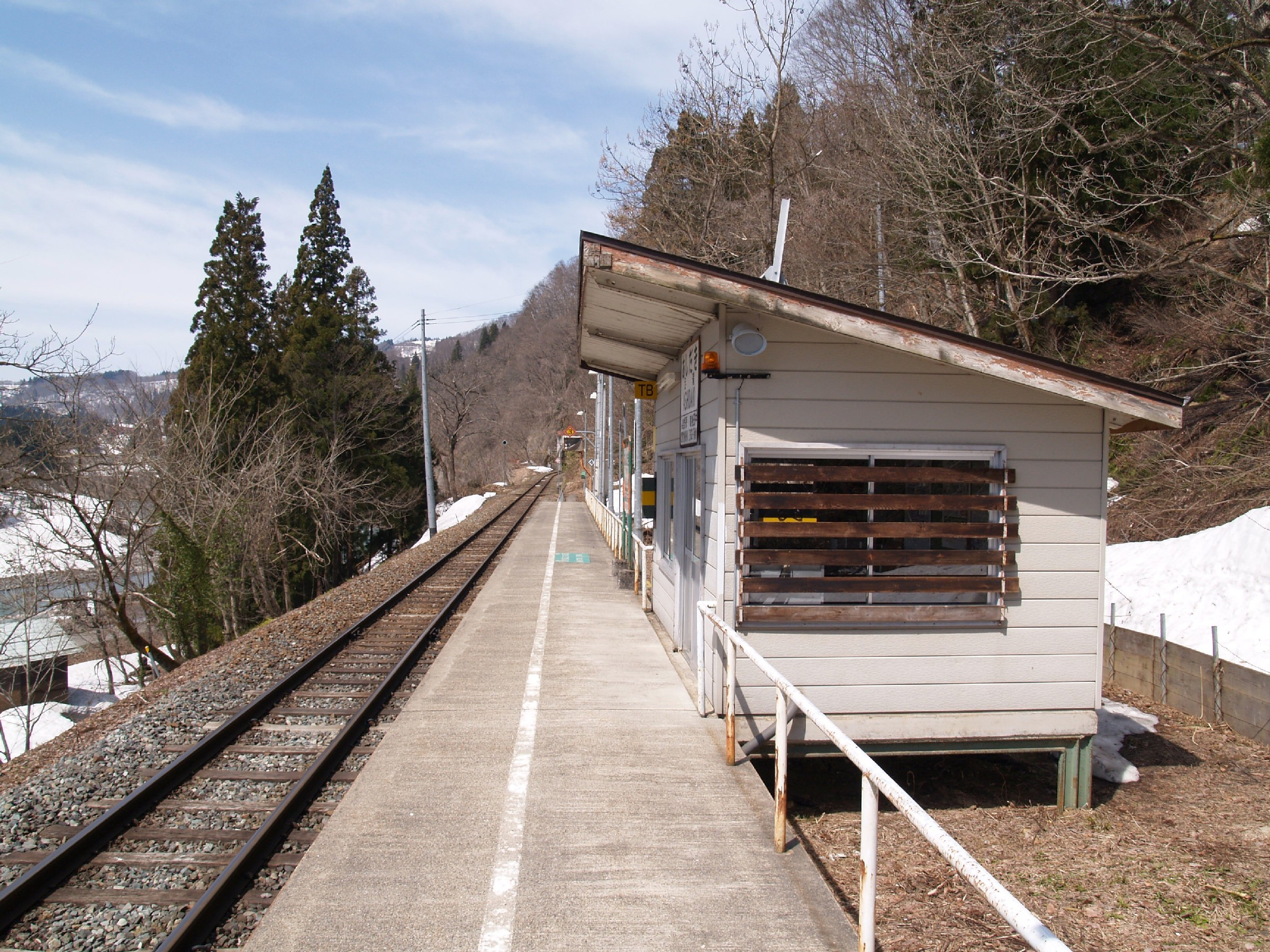
- Ashidaki Station platform

General information
- Location: Kamigō-Teraishi, Tsunan-machi, Nakauonuma-gun, Niigata-ken 949-8126; Japan
- Coordinates: 36.9988°N 138.6036°E
- Elevation: 251.2 metres (824 ft)
- Operator: JR East
- Line: ■ Iiyama Line
- Distance: 52.5 kilometres (32.6 mi) from Toyono
- Platforms: 1 side platform
- Tracks: 1

Other information
- Fare zone: status = unstaffed
- Website: Official website

History
- Opened: 15 July 1960

Services
Preceding station	JR East	Following station
Mori-Miyanohara towards Nagano	Iiyama Line	Echigo-Tanaka towards Echigo-Kawaguchi
Location
- Location within Japan

Ashidaki Station (足滝駅, Ashidaki-eki) is a railway station in the town of Tsunan, Nakauonuma District, Niigata Prefecture, Japan operated by East Japan Railway Company (JR East).

== Lines ==
Ashidaki Station is served by the Iiyama Line, and is 52.5 kilometers from the starting point of the line at Toyono Station.

== Station layout ==
The station consists of one side platform serving a single bi-directional track. There is no station building, but only a shelter built directly on the platform. The station is unattended.

== History ==
Ashidaki Station opened on 15 July 1960. With the privatization of Japanese National Railways (JNR) on 1 April 1987, the station came under the control of JR East.

== Surrounding area ==
- Shinano River

== See also ==
- List of railway stations in Japan
