= Uchigamaki Station =

Railway station in Ojiya, Niigata Prefecture, Japan

Uchigamaki Station 内ヶ巻駅
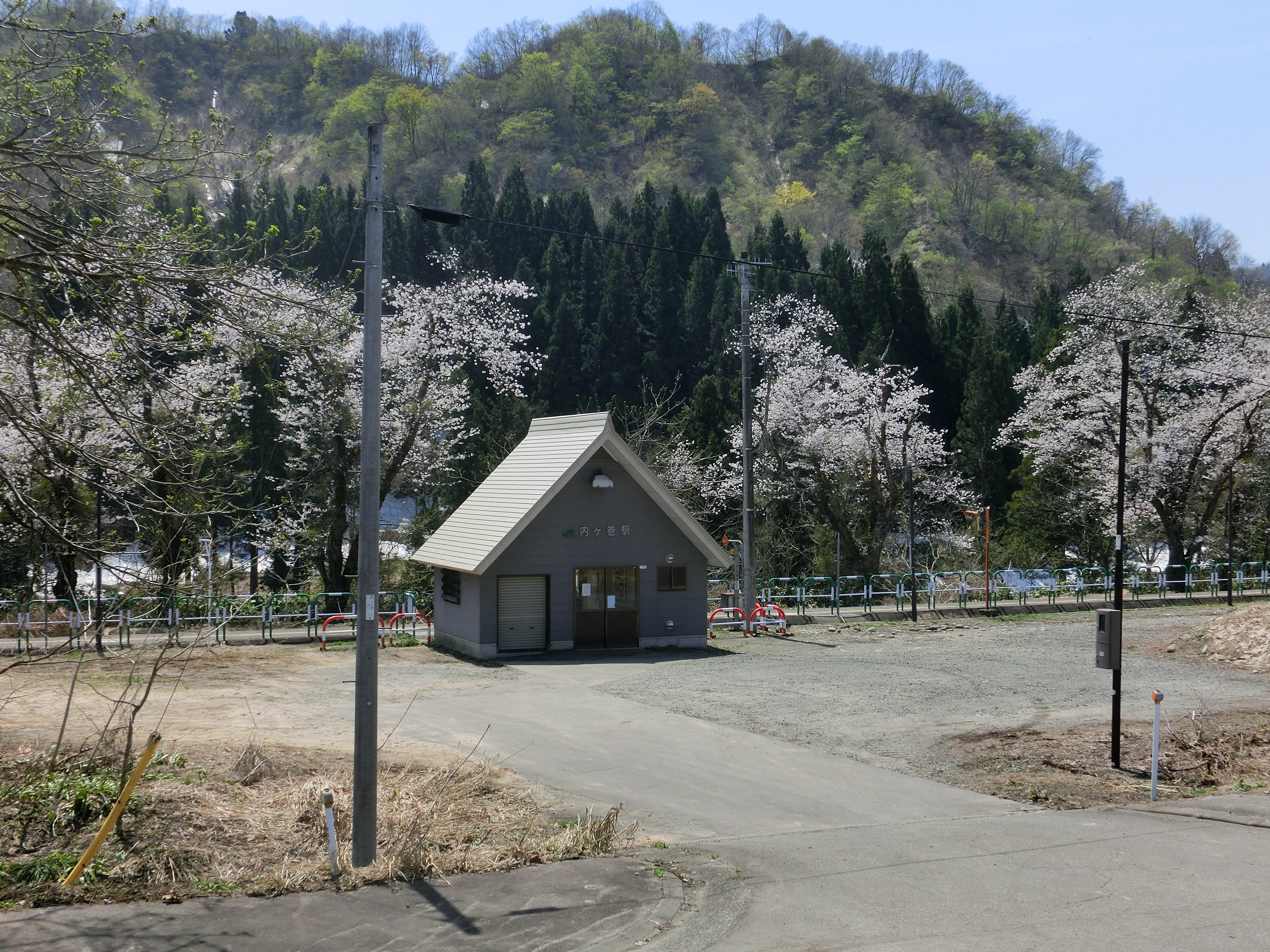
- Uchigamaki Station, April 2018

General information
- Location: Kawai, Ojiya-shi, Niigata-ken 949-8722; Japan
- Coordinates: 37.2502°N 138.8518°E
- Operator: JR East
- Line: ■ Iiyama Line
- Distance: 93.2 kilometres (57.9 mi) from Toyono
- Platforms: 1 side platform
- Tracks: 1

Other information
- Status: Unstaffed
- Website: Official website

History
- Opened: 15 June 1927
- Rebuilt: 1997

Services
Preceding station	JR East	Following station
Echigo-Iwasawa towards Nagano	Iiyama Line	Echigo-Kawaguchi Terminus
Location
- Location within Japan

Uchigamaki Station (内ヶ巻駅, Uchigamaki-eki) is a railway station in the city of Ojiya, Niigata, Japan, operated by East Japan Railway Company (JR East).

== Lines ==
Uchigamaki Station is served by the Iiyama Line, and is 93.2 kilometers from the starting point of the line at Toyono Station.

== Station layout ==
The station consists of one ground-level side platform serving a single bi-directional track. The station is unattended.

== History ==
Uchigamaki Station opened on 15 June 1927. With the privatization of Japanese National Railways (JNR) on 1 April 1987, the station came under the control of JR East. A new station building was completed in 1997.

== See also ==
- List of railway stations in Japan
