= Shinano-Asano Station =

Railway station in Nagano, Nagano Prefecture, Japan

Shinano-Asano Station 信濃浅野駅
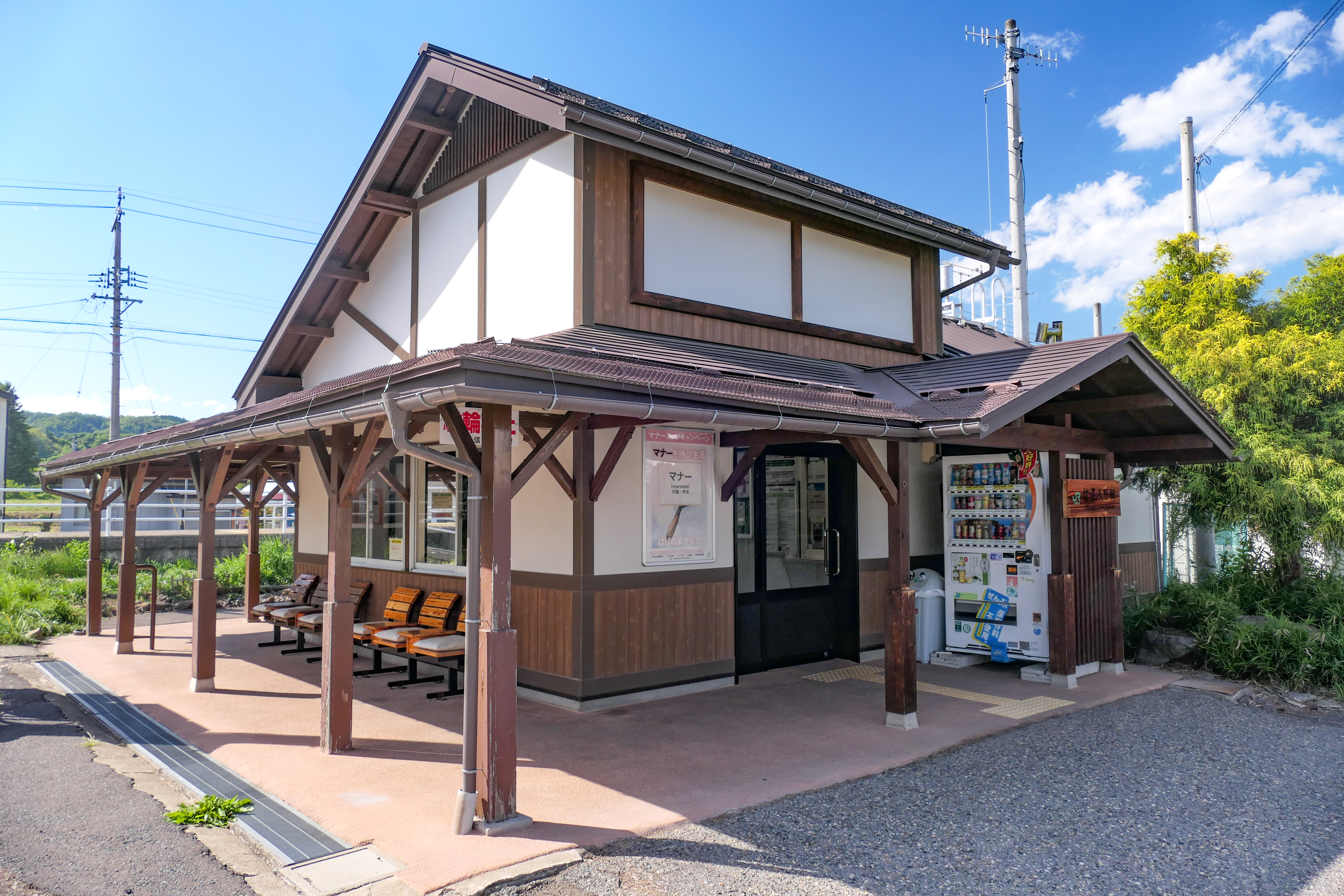
- Shinano-Asano Station, May 2022

General information
- Location: Toyonomachi Asano, Nagano-shi, Nagano-ken 389-1104; Japan
- Coordinates: 36.7223°N 138.2946°E
- Elevation: 158.0 metres (518.4 ft)
- Operator: JR East
- Line: ■ Iiyama Line
- Distance: 2.2 kilometres (1.4 mi) from Toyono
- Platforms: 1 side platform
- Tracks: 1

Other information
- Website: Official website

History
- Opened: 20 October 1921
- Former names: Shinshū-Asano (to 1944)

Passengers
- FY2017: 158 (daily)

Services
| Preceding station | JR East | Following station |
|---|---|---|
| Toyono towards Nagano | Iiyama Line | Tategahana towards Echigo-Kawaguchi |
Location
- Location within Nagano Prefecture Location within Japan

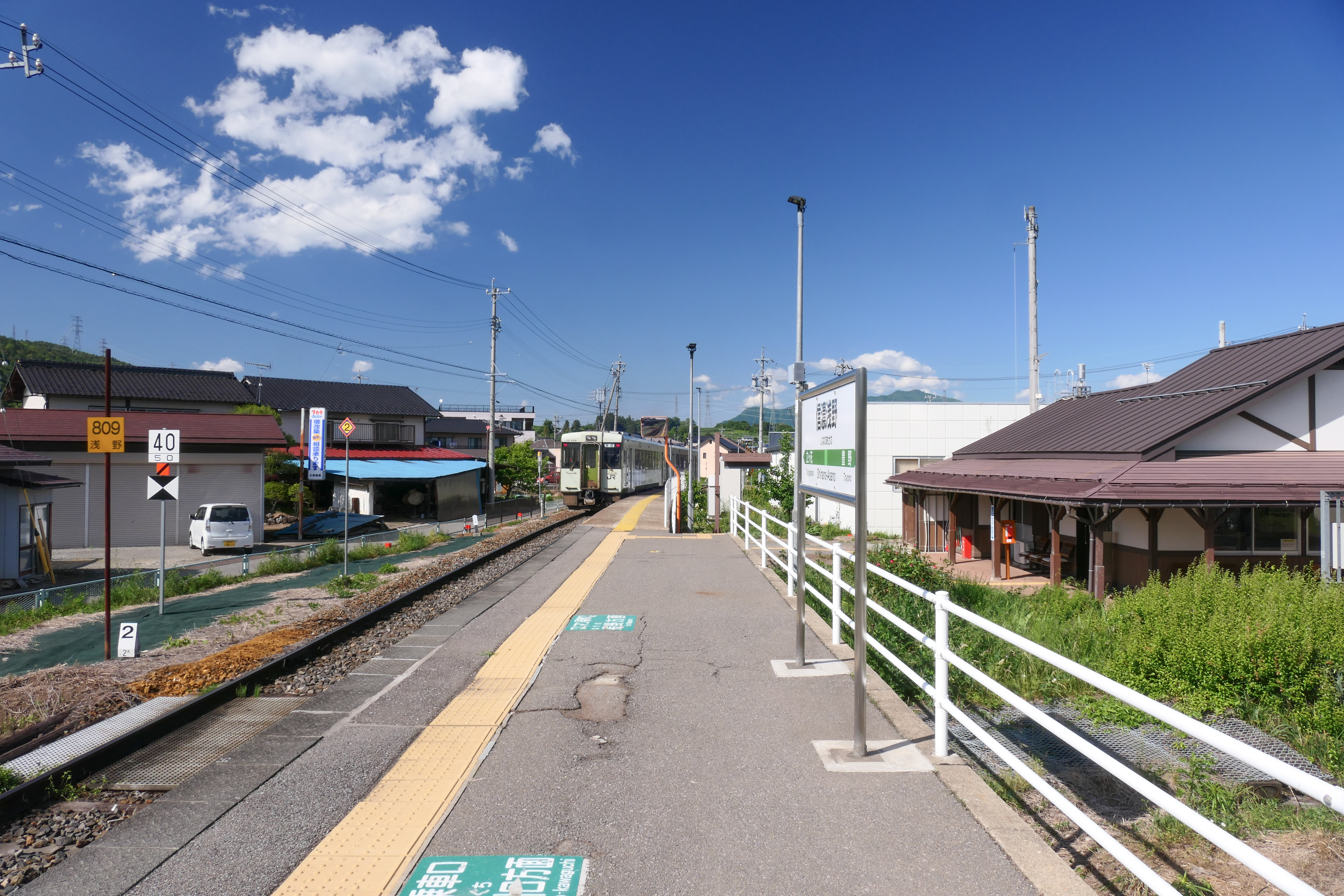
Station platform, May 2022

Shinano-Asano Station (信濃浅野駅, Shinano-Asano-eki) is a railway station on the Iiyama Line, East Japan Railway Company (JR East), in Toyono-Asano in the city of Nagano, Nagano Prefecture, Japan.

== Lines ==
Shinano-Asano Station is served by the Iiyama Line, and is 2.2 kilometers from the starting point of the line at Toyono Station.

== Station layout ==
The station consists of one side platform serving a single bi-directional track. The station formerly had an island platform with a side platform for freight. The station is staffed.

== History ==
Shinano-Asano Station opened on 20 October 1921 as Shinshū-Asano Station (信州浅野駅, Shinshū-Asano-eki). It was renamed to its present name on 1 June 1944 with the nationalization of the Iiyama Railway. With the privatization of Japanese National Railways (JNR) on 1 April 1987, the station came under the control of JR East.

== Passenger statistics ==
In 2017 fiscal year, the station was used by an average of 158 passengers daily (boarding passengers only).

== Surrounding area ==
The station is located in a rural area, surrounded by apple orchards.

- Asano Post Office

== See also ==
- List of railway stations in Japan
