= Iiyama Line =

Railway line in Japan

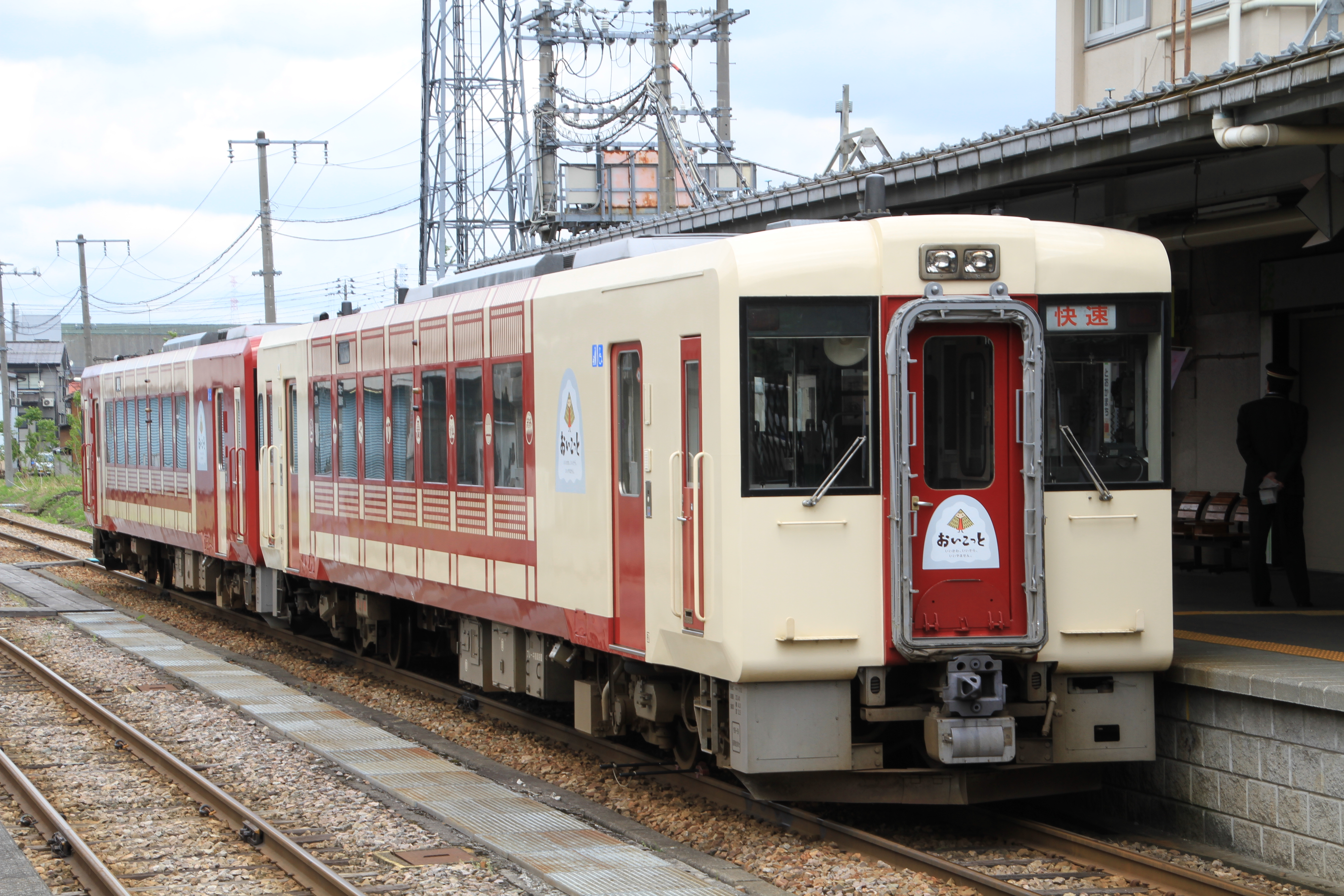
- KiHa 100 series DMU Rapid Oykot at Tōkamachi Station, May 2015

Overview
- Native name: 飯山線
- Status: In operation
- Owner: JR East
- Locale: Nagano, Niigata Prefectures
- Termini: Toyono; Echigo-Kawaguchi
- Stations: 31

Service
- Type: Heavy rail
- Operator(s): JR East
- Rolling stock: KiHa 110 series DMU

History
- Opened: 1921; 105 years ago

Technical
- Line length: 96.7 km (60.1 mi)
- Number of tracks: Entire line single tracked
- Character: Rural
- Track gauge: 1,067 mm (3 ft 6 in)
- Electrification: None
- Operating speed: 85 km/h (53 mph)
Route map

The Iiyama Line (飯山線, Iiyama-sen) is a railway line in Japan linking Toyono Station in Nagano, Nagano Prefecture and Echigo-Kawaguchi Station in Nagaoka, Niigata Prefecture. It is operated by East Japan Railway Company (JR East).

== Stations ==
At Toyono all trains operate a through service to/from Nagano on the Shinano Railway Kita-Shinano Line.

At Echigo-Kawaguchi selected morning trains operate a through service to/from Nagaoka via the Jōetsu Line and Shin'etsu Main Line.

Line	Station	Japanese	km	Connections	Location	
Shinano Railway Kita-Shinano Line	Nagano (Note: Although the official terminus of the Iiyama Line is at Toyono, all trains on the line begin and end at Nagano.)	長野	0.0	Hokuriku Shinkansen; Shinano Railway Kita-Shinano Line; Shinano Railway Line; Shin'etsu Main Line; Nagano Electric Railway	Nagano City	Nagano; Prefecture
Shinano Railway Kita-Shinano Line	Kita-Nagano	北長野	3.9		Nagano City	Nagano; Prefecture
Shinano Railway Kita-Shinano Line	Sansai	三才	6.8		Nagano City	Nagano; Prefecture
Shinano Railway Kita-Shinano Line	Toyono	豊野	10.8	Shinano Railway Kita-Shinano Line (through service)	Nagano City	Nagano; Prefecture
Iiyama Line	Toyono	豊野	0.0	Shinano Railway Kita-Shinano Line (through service)	Nagano City	Nagano; Prefecture
Iiyama Line	Shinano-Asano	信濃浅野	2.2		Nagano City	Nagano; Prefecture
Iiyama Line	Tategahana	立ヶ花	3.9		Nagano City	Nagano; Prefecture
Iiyama Line	Kamiimai	上今井	6.9		Nakano City	Nagano; Prefecture
Iiyama Line	Kaesa	替佐	8.8		Nakano City	Nagano; Prefecture
Iiyama Line	Hachisu	蓮	14.6		Iiyama City	Nagano; Prefecture
Iiyama Line	Iiyama	飯山	19.2	Hokuriku Shinkansen	Iiyama City	Nagano; Prefecture
Iiyama Line	Kita-Iiyama	北飯山	20.5		Iiyama City	Nagano; Prefecture
Iiyama Line	Shinano-Taira	信濃平	23.8		Iiyama City	Nagano; Prefecture
Iiyama Line	Togari-Nozawaonsen	戸狩野沢温泉	27.5		Iiyama City	Nagano; Prefecture
Iiyama Line	Kamisakai	上境	31.1		Iiyama City	Nagano; Prefecture
Iiyama Line	Kami-Kuwanagawa	上桑名川	35.4		Iiyama City	Nagano; Prefecture
Iiyama Line	Kuwanagawa	桑名川	37.6		Iiyama City	Nagano; Prefecture
Iiyama Line	Nishi-Ōtaki	西大滝	39.7		Iiyama City	Nagano; Prefecture
Iiyama Line	Shinano-Shiratori	信濃白鳥	41.8		Sakae Village, Shimominochi District	Nagano; Prefecture
Iiyama Line	Hirataki	平滝	44.7		Sakae Village, Shimominochi District	Nagano; Prefecture
Iiyama Line	Yokokura	横倉	46.6		Sakae Village, Shimominochi District	Nagano; Prefecture
Iiyama Line	Mori-Miyanohara	森宮野原	49.7		Sakae Village, Shimominochi District	Nagano; Prefecture
Iiyama Line	Ashidaki	足滝	52.5		Tsunan Town, Nakauonuma District	Niigata; Prefecture
Iiyama Line	Echigo-Tanaka	越後田中	54.9		Tsunan Town, Nakauonuma District	Niigata; Prefecture
Iiyama Line	Tsunan	津南	57.9		Tsunan Town, Nakauonuma District	Niigata; Prefecture
Iiyama Line	Echigo-Shikawatari	越後鹿渡	62.1		Tsunan Town, Nakauonuma District	Niigata; Prefecture
Iiyama Line	Echigo-Tazawa	越後田沢	64.5		Tōkamachi City	Niigata; Prefecture
Iiyama Line	Echigo-Mizusawa	越後水沢	67.5		Tōkamachi City	Niigata; Prefecture
Iiyama Line	Doichi	土市	70.4		Tōkamachi City	Niigata; Prefecture
Iiyama Line	Tōkamachi	十日町	75.3	■Hokuhoku Line	Tōkamachi City	Niigata; Prefecture
Iiyama Line	Uonuma-Nakajō	魚沼中条	78.4		Tōkamachi City	Niigata; Prefecture
Iiyama Line	Gejō	下条	82.8		Tōkamachi City	Niigata; Prefecture
Iiyama Line	Echigo-Iwasawa	越後岩沢	88.1		Ojiya City	Niigata; Prefecture
Iiyama Line	Uchigamaki	内ヶ巻	93.2		Ojiya City	Niigata; Prefecture
Iiyama Line	Echigo-Kawaguchi	越後川口	96.7	■Jōetsu Line (some trains operate a through service to/from Nagaoka)	Nagaoka City	Niigata; Prefecture

== Rolling stock ==
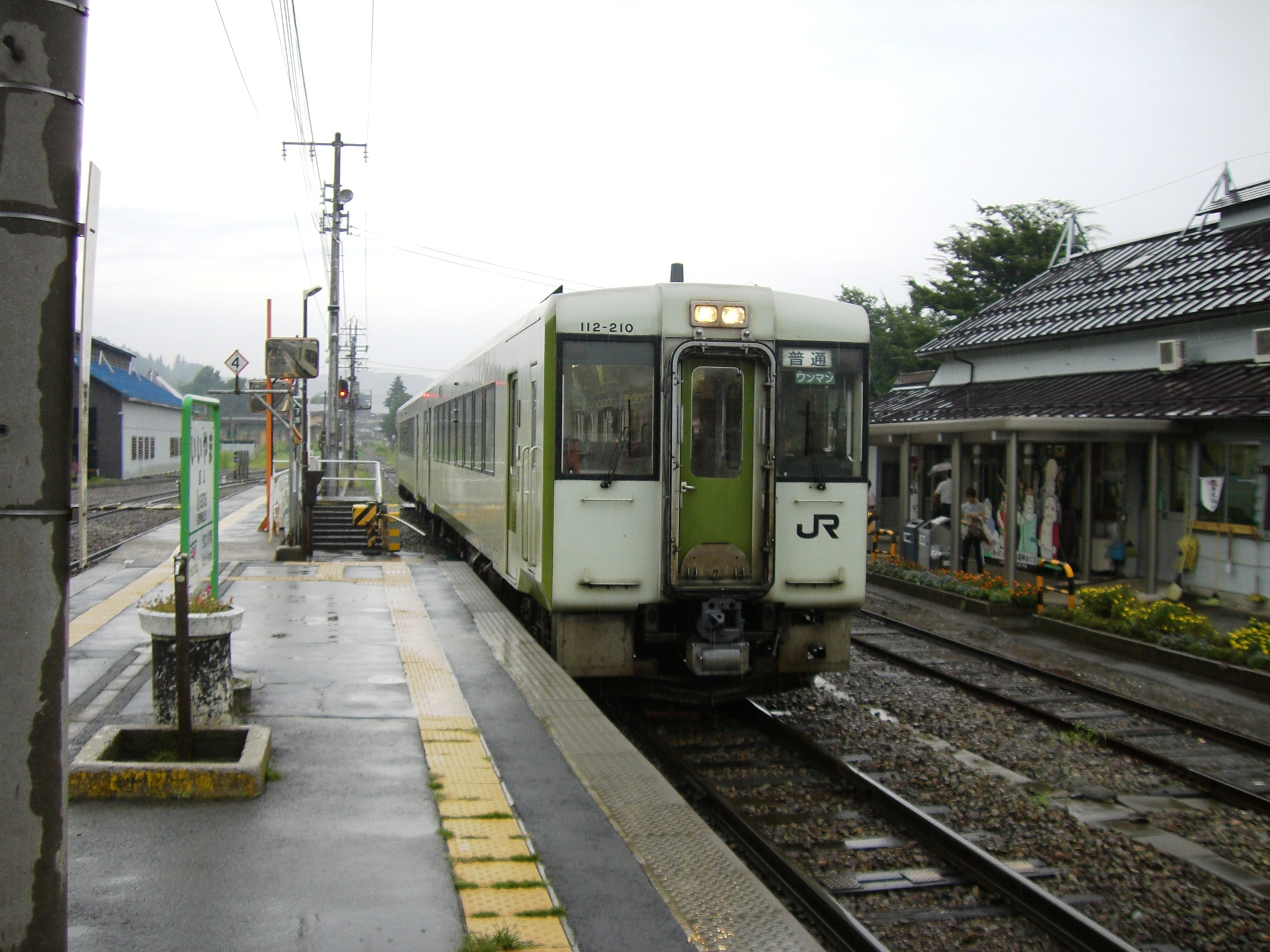
KiHa 110 series (Iiyama Station)

- KiHa 110 series DMUs

== History ==
The Iiyama Railway Co. opened the first section from Toyono to its namesake town in 1921, and extended the line in sections to Tokamachi in 1929, where it connected to the Japanese Government Railways line from Echigo-Kawaguchi which had opened in 1927.

The Iiyama Railway Co. was nationalised in 1944, and freight services ceased in 1987.

The line sees much snow in the winter. The line uses avalanche fences along steep slopes, snow sheds and has a melting system at level crossings to deal with the snow. A record 7.85m of snow fell at Mori-Miyanohara Station in February 1945, an event that is remembered with a pole just outside the station marking the vast amount of snow.
