= Iiyama =

Iiyama 飯山市
- City
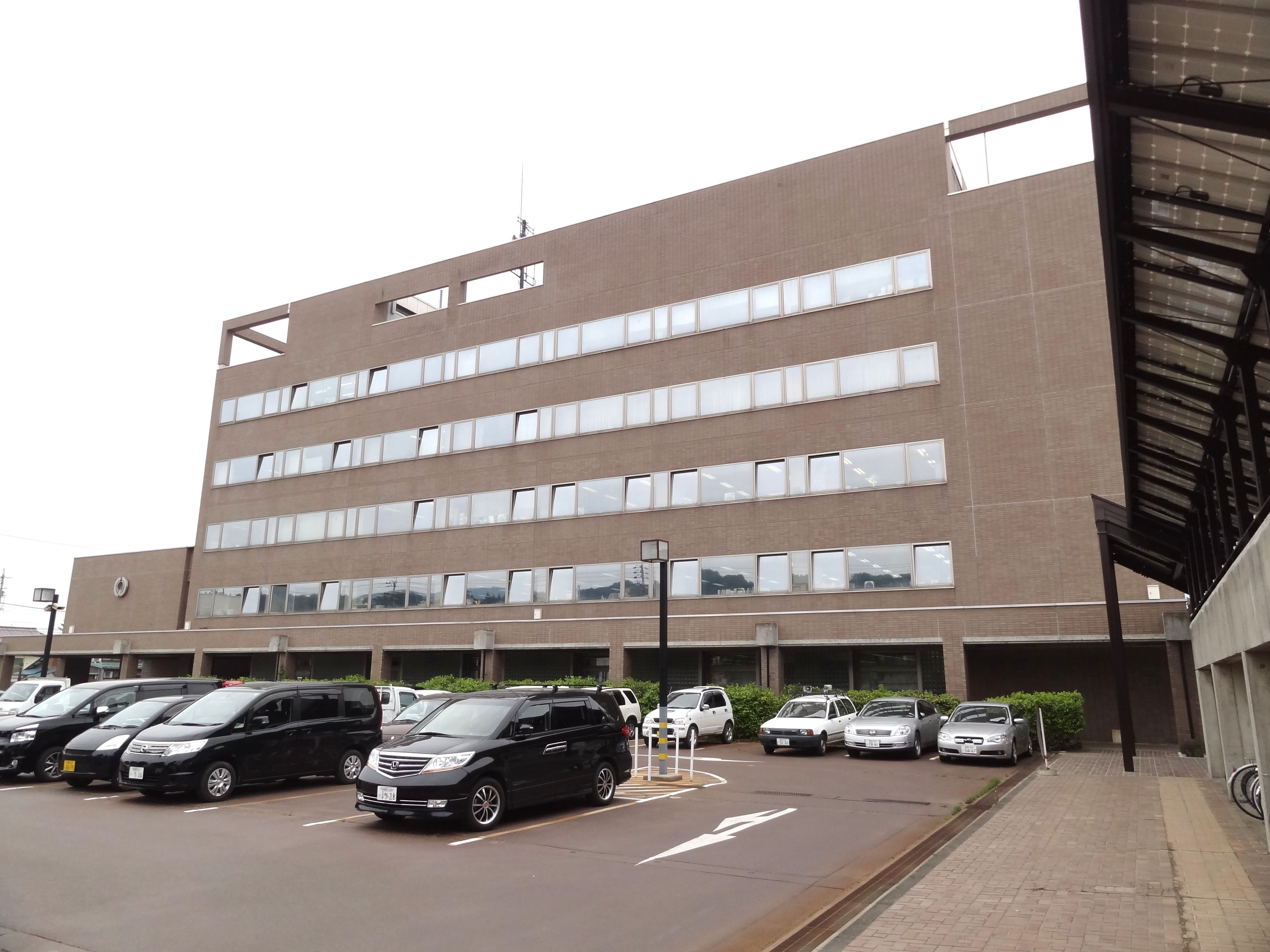
- Iiyama City Hall

- Flag Seal

- Location of Iiyama in Nagano

- Coordinates: 36°51′5.9″N 138°21′55.9″E
- Country: Japan
- Region: Chūbu (Kōshin'etsu)
- Prefecture: Nagano

Government
  - Mayor: Masanori Adachi

Area
  - Total: 202.43 km^{2} (78.16 sq mi)

Population (February 2019)
  - Total: 20,118
  - Density: 99.383/km^{2} (257.40/sq mi)
- Time zone: UTC+9 (Japan Standard Time)
- Symbols
  - Tree: Siebold's beech
  - Flower: Camellia
  - Bird: Mandarin duck
  - Insect: Luehdorfia japonica
- Phone number: 0269-62-3111
- Address: 1110-1, Ōaza Iiyama, Iiyama-shi, Nagano-ken 389-2292
- Website: Official website

Iiyama (飯山市, Iiyama-shi; Japanese pronunciation: [ìí.jä́.mä́(.ɕì), íí-]) is a city located in Nagano Prefecture, Japan. As of 1 February 2019, the city had an estimated population of 20,118 in 7372 households, and a population density of 99 persons per km^{2}. The total area of the city is 202.43 square kilometres (78.16 sq mi). It markets itself as "Japan's Hometown" and is known as the "Little Kyoto of Snow Country".

== Geography ==
Iiyama is located in the mountainous far northern portion of Nagano Prefecture, and is bordered by Niigata Prefecture to the north. The area is known for severe winters with heavy snowfall. The Chikuma River (the longest river in Japan) runs through the centre of the area and becomes known as the Shinano River when it passes into Niigata Prefecture.

=== Surrounding municipalities ===
- Nagano Prefecture
  - Kijimadaira
  - Nakano
  - Nozawaonsen
  - Sakae
  - Shinano
- Niigata Prefecture
  - Jōetsu
  - Myōkō

== Climate ==
The city has a climate characterized by characterized by hot and humid summers, and relatively mild winters (Köppen climate classification Dfa). The average annual temperature in Iiyama is 11.3 °C (52.3 °F). The average annual rainfall is 1,412.0 mm (55.59 in) with January as the wettest month. The temperatures are highest on average in August, at around 24.7 °C (76.5 °F), and lowest in January, at around −1.6 °C (29.1 °F). All of the city is considered part of the snow country of Japan, with heavy accumulations of snow in winter.

Climate data for Iiyama (1991–2020 normals, extremes 1978–present)
Month	Jan	Feb	Mar	Apr	May	Jun	Jul	Aug	Sep	Oct	Nov	Dec	Year
Record high °C (°F)	12.8 (55.0)	17.9 (64.2)	23.4 (74.1)	32.2 (90.0)	33.6 (92.5)	36.1 (97.0)	37.2 (99.0)	37.6 (99.7)	36.5 (97.7)	32.1 (89.8)	25.5 (77.9)	22.2 (72.0)	37.6 (99.7)
Mean daily maximum °C (°F)	2.5 (36.5)	3.6 (38.5)	8.0 (46.4)	16.1 (61.0)	22.5 (72.5)	25.6 (78.1)	29.1 (84.4)	30.6 (87.1)	26.0 (78.8)	19.7 (67.5)	13.0 (55.4)	5.9 (42.6)	16.9 (62.4)
Daily mean °C (°F)	−1.6 (29.1)	−1.2 (29.8)	2.4 (36.3)	9.3 (48.7)	15.7 (60.3)	19.9 (67.8)	23.7 (74.7)	24.7 (76.5)	20.4 (68.7)	13.8 (56.8)	7.2 (45.0)	1.4 (34.5)	11.3 (52.3)
Mean daily minimum °C (°F)	−6.2 (20.8)	−6.3 (20.7)	−2.7 (27.1)	3.3 (37.9)	9.4 (48.9)	15.1 (59.2)	19.7 (67.5)	20.4 (68.7)	16.1 (61.0)	9.1 (48.4)	2.6 (36.7)	−2.5 (27.5)	6.5 (43.7)
Record low °C (°F)	−18.6 (−1.5)	−19.7 (−3.5)	−15.3 (4.5)	−7.7 (18.1)	−0.4 (31.3)	4.4 (39.9)	11.8 (53.2)	11.2 (52.2)	5.6 (42.1)	−2.1 (28.2)	−7.0 (19.4)	−15.5 (4.1)	−19.7 (−3.5)
Average precipitation mm (inches)	171.8 (6.76)	117.3 (4.62)	96.2 (3.79)	63.1 (2.48)	69.2 (2.72)	101.4 (3.99)	155.7 (6.13)	128.8 (5.07)	127.2 (5.01)	117.2 (4.61)	96.8 (3.81)	167.4 (6.59)	1,412 (55.59)
Average snowfall cm (inches)	303 (119)	228 (90)	121 (48)	15 (5.9)	0 (0)	0 (0)	0 (0)	0 (0)	0 (0)	0 (0)	4 (1.6)	157 (62)	821 (323)
Average precipitation days (≥ 1.0 mm)	19.9	16.5	14.9	10.1	9.5	10.6	13.1	10.6	11.6	11.2	12.7	17.4	158.0
Mean monthly sunshine hours	72.7	92.2	132.6	177.0	206.0	161.2	161.4	203.1	140.1	132.7	104.4	83.7	1,668.7
Source: Japan Meteorological Agency (1991–2020 normals, extremes 1978–present)

== History ==
The area of present-day Iiyama was part of ancient Shinano Province. The area was part of the holdings of Iiyama Domain during the Edo period, and the core of the city was the jōkamachi surrounding Iiyama Castle, held by a cadet branch of the Honda clan. The modern town of Iiyama was established within Shimominochi District, Nagano with the establishment of the municipalities system on April 1, 1889. It was raised to city status on August 1, 1954, by the merger of the town of Iiyama with neighboring villages of Akitsu, Tokiwa, Yanagihara, Tozama, Kijima and Zuiho. The villages of Ōta and Okayama were also annexed in 1955.

== Demographics ==
Per Japanese census data, the population of Iiyama has declined over the past 70 years.

Historical population
Year	Pop.	±%
1940	35,156	—
1950	41,395	+17.7%
1960	37,592	−9.2%
1970	32,159	−14.5%
1980	30,073	−6.5%
1990	28,114	−6.5%
2000	26,420	−6.0%
2010	23,548	−10.9%
2020	19,539	−17.0%

== Government ==
Iiyama has a mayor-council form of government with a directly elected mayor and a unicameral city legislature of 16 members.

== Economy ==
The economy of Iiyama is primarily agricultural with emphasis on rice, asparagus, mushrooms and potatoes. Manufacturing includes production of Butsudan, skis and electronics. Seasonal tourism to ski resorts and hot springs also make a major contribution.

The TV and electronics manufacturer Iiyama was founded in the city in 1972, although, after a series of mergers, the company is no longer headquartered there. The old office continues to be used as a manufacturing centre for Iiyama's parent company, Mouse Computer.

== Education ==
Iiyama has seven public elementary schools and two public middle schools operated by the city government. The city has one public high school operated by the Nagano Prefectural Board of Education.

== Transportation ==
=== Railway ===
- East Japan Railway Company - Hokuriku Shinkansen
  - Iiyama
- East Japan Railway Company - Iiyama Line
  - Hachisu – Iiyama – Kita-Iiyama – Shinano-Taira – Togari-Nozawaonsen – Kamisakai – Kami-Kuwanagawa – Kuwanagawa – Nishi-Ōtaki

=== Highway ===
- Jōshin-etsu Expressway
- National Route 117
- National Route 293
- National Route 403

== International relations ==
- – Futian District, Shenzhen, China – friendship city since July 10, 2014.
- Bathurst, New South Wales, Australia, — sister city since November 2014.

== Local attractions ==
- There are many well known ski resorts in the area. These include Nozawa Onsen Snow Resort, Madarao Sympathique (now closed), Madarao Kogen, Tangram Ski Circus, Togari Onsen, and Hokuryuko
- The Cultural Landscape of Kosuge Village and Mt. Kosuge (小菅の里及び小菅山の文化的景観, kosuge no sato oyobi kosugeyama no bunkateki keikan) is a Designated Cultural Landscape of Japan.
- Iiyama also hosts a number of popular festivals such as the Iiyama Snow Festival and Kamakura Snow Hut Festival in February and Iiyama Dontokoi in August.
- The Shinetsu Trail, that runs through Iiyama along the border between Nagano prefecture and Niigata prefecture, is a popular hiking spot in summer.
- In February 2015, Guinness World Records confirmed that the city had officially broken the record for 'most snowmen built in an hour.'

== Notable people from Iiyama ==
- Naoki Inose – author and former Tokyo governor
