= Togari-Nozawaonsen Station =

Railway station in Iiyama, Nagano Prefecture, Japan

Togari-Nozawaonsen Station 戸狩野沢温泉駅
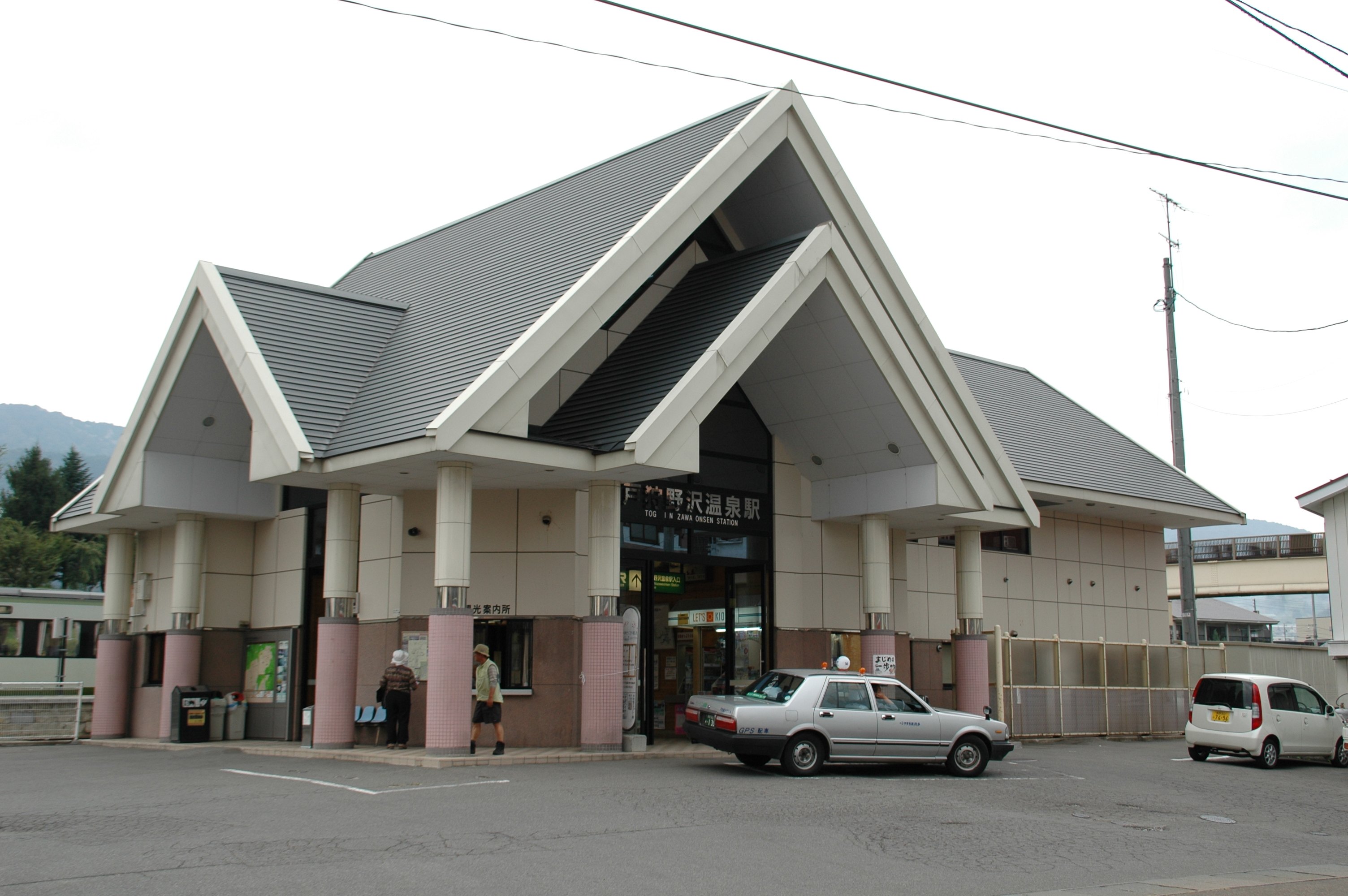
- Togari-Nozawaonsen Station, October 2005

General information
- Location: Terusato, Iiyama-shi, Nagano-ken 389-2413; Japan
- Coordinates: 36.9166°N 138.3929°E
- Elevation: 313.5 metres (1,029 ft)
- Operator: JR East
- Line: ■ Iiyama Line
- Distance: 27.5 kilometres (17.1 mi) from Toyono
- Platforms: 1 island platform

Other information
- Status: Staffed (Midori no Madoguchi)
- Website: Official website

History
- Opened: 6 July 1923
- Former names: Togari (to 1987)

Passengers
- FY2017: 148

Services
Preceding station	JR East	Following station
Shinano-Taira towards Nagano	Iiyama Line	Kamisakai towards Echigo-Kawaguchi
Location
- Location within Nagano Prefecture Location within Japan

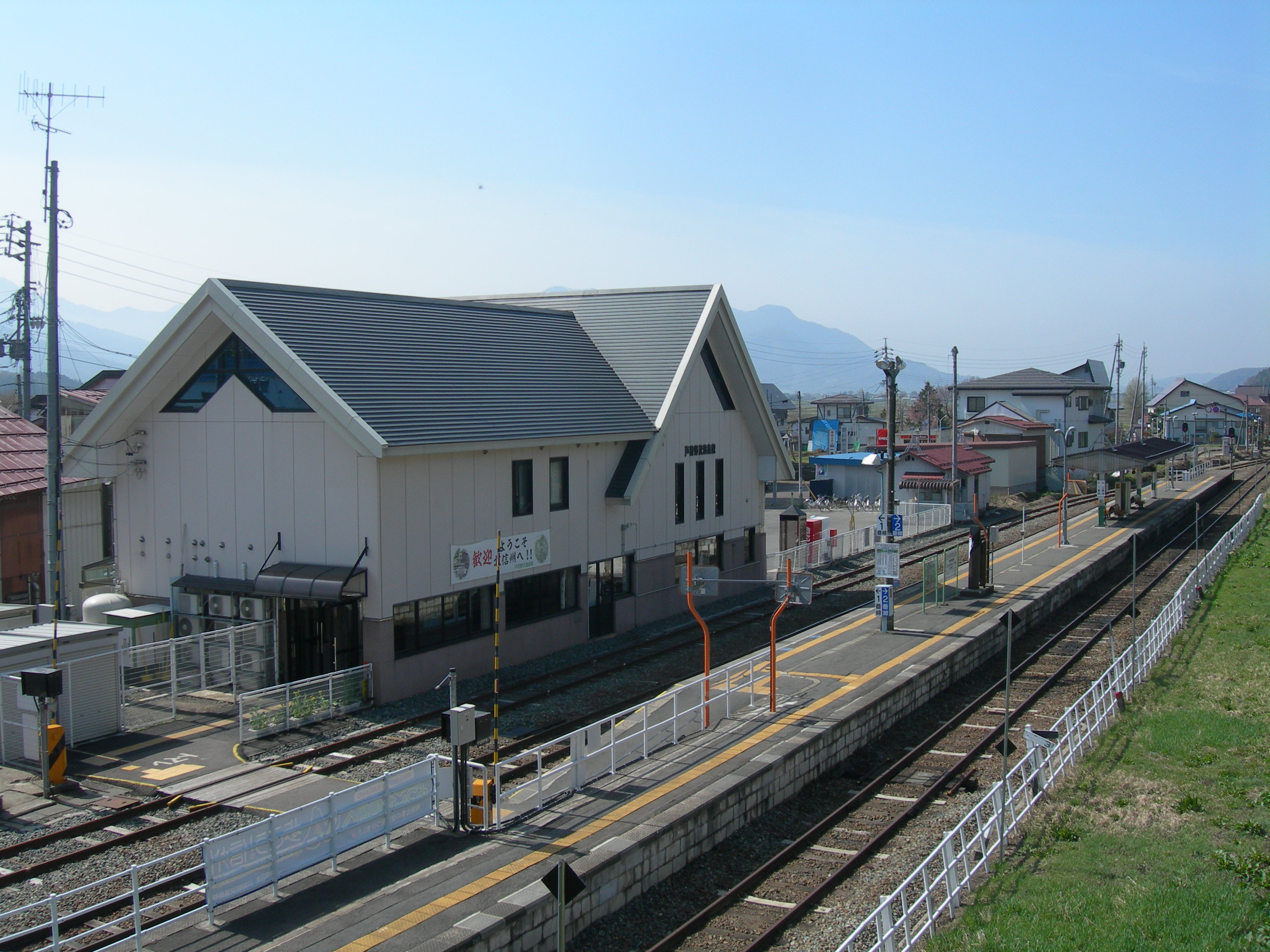
Station platforms in April 2009

Togari-Nozawaonsen Station (戸狩野沢温泉駅, Togarinozawaonsen-eki) is a railway station in the city of Iiyama, Nagano Prefecture, Japan operated by East Japan Railway Company (JR East). Its name is also written "Togarinozawa Onsen Station".

== Lines ==
Togari-Nozawaonsen Station is served by the Iiyama Line, and is 27.5 kilometers from the starting point of the line at Toyono Station.

== Station layout ==
The station consists of one island platform connected to the station building by a level crossing. The station has a Midori no Madoguchi staffed ticket office.

=== Platforms ===
1	■ Iiyama Line	for Nagano
2	■ Iiyama Line	for Mori-Miyanohara, Tōkamachi, and Echigo-Kawaguchi

== History ==
Togari-Nozawaonsen Station opened on 6 July 1923 as Togari Station (戸狩駅). It was renamed to its present name on 1 March 1987. With the privatization of Japanese National Railways (JNR) on 1 April 1987, the station came under the control of JR East.

== Passenger statistics ==
In fiscal 2017, the station was used by an average of 148 passengers daily (boarding passengers only).

== Surrounding area ==
- Chikuma River
- National Route 117
- Nozawa Onsen and Ski Resort

== See also ==
- List of railway stations in Japan
