= Japan National Route 117 =

National highway in Japan

National Route 117
- 国道117号
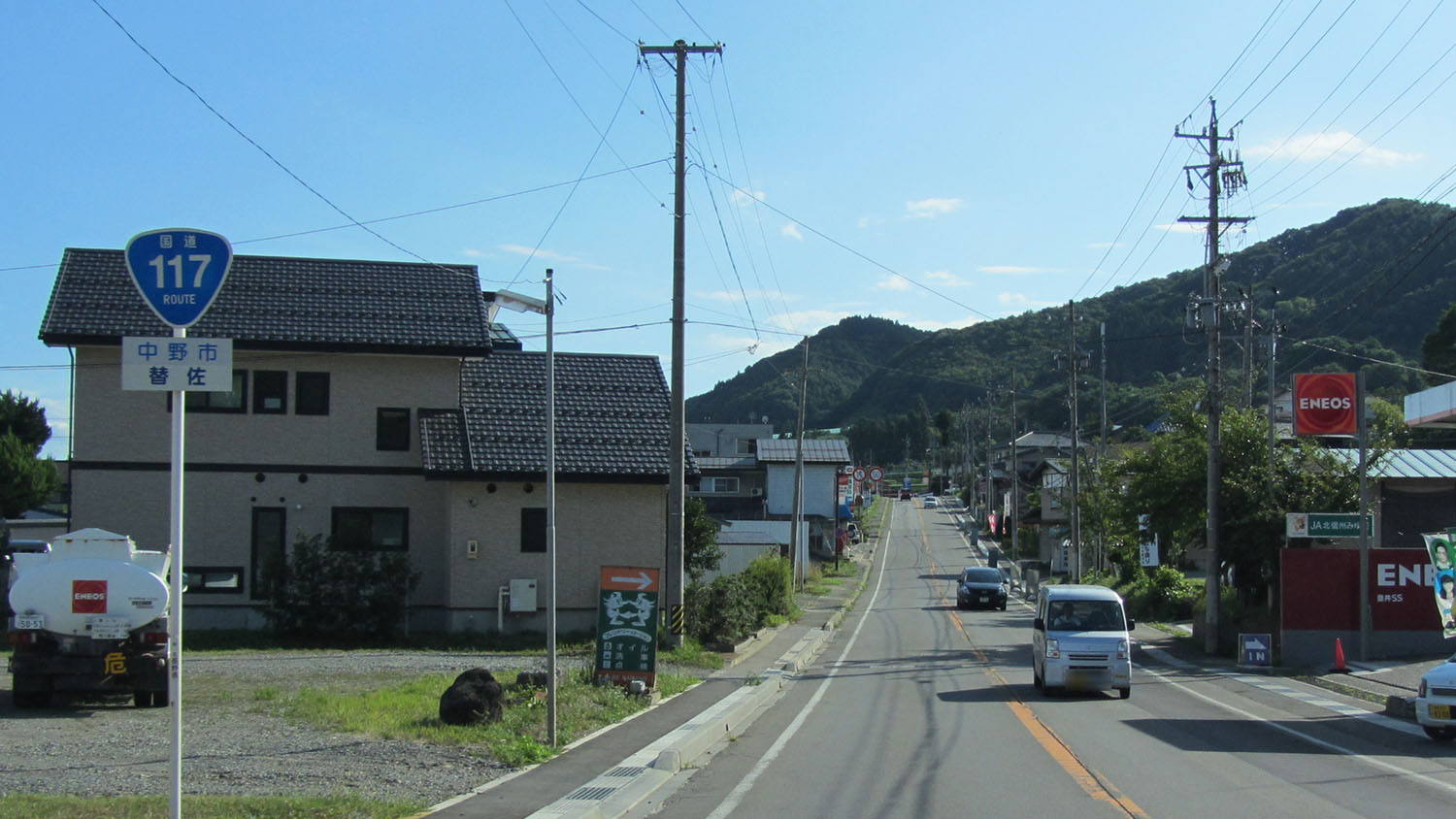

Route information
- Length: 119.6 km (74.3 mi)
- Existed: 18 May 1953–present

Major junctions
- South end: National Route 18 in Nagano, Nagano
- North end: National Route 17 in Ojiya, Niigata

Location
- Country: Japan

Highway system
- National highways of Japan; Expressways of Japan
← National Route 116	→ National Route 118

Route 117 (国道117号, Kokudō hyakujūnana-gō) is a national highway connecting Nagano, Nagano and Ojiya, Niigata in Japan.

== Route data ==
- Length: 119.6 km (74.3 mi)
- Origin: Nagano City (originates at junction with Route 18)
- Terminus: Ojiya City (ends at Junction with Route 17)
- Major cities: Iiyama, Tokamachi

== History ==
- 1953-05-18 - Second Class National Highway 117 (from Nagano to Ojiya)
- 1965-04-01 - General National Highway 117 (from Nagano to Ojiya)

== Overlapping sections ==
- In Nagano City, from Nakagosho intersection to Nishiowaribe intersection: Route 19
- In Nagano City, Nishiowaribe intersection to Asano intersection: Route 18
- In Nagano City, Higashiwada intersection to Yanagihara-Kita intersection: Route 406
- In Iiyama City, Komaki-bashi kita intersection to Ario intersection: Route 292

== Municipalities passed through ==
- Nagano Prefecture
  - Nagano - Obuse - Nagano - Nakano - Iiyama - Nozawaonsen - Sakae
- Niigata Prefecture
  - Tsunan - Tokamachi - Ojiya - Nagaoka - Ojiya

== Intersects with ==
- Nagano Prefecture
  - Route 18
  - Route 19
  - Route 406
  - Route 406
  - Route 18
  - Route 292
  - Route 403
  - Route 292
  - Route 403
- Niigata Prefecture
