= Toyono Station =

Railway station in Nagano, Nagano Prefecture, Japan

Toyono Station 豊野駅
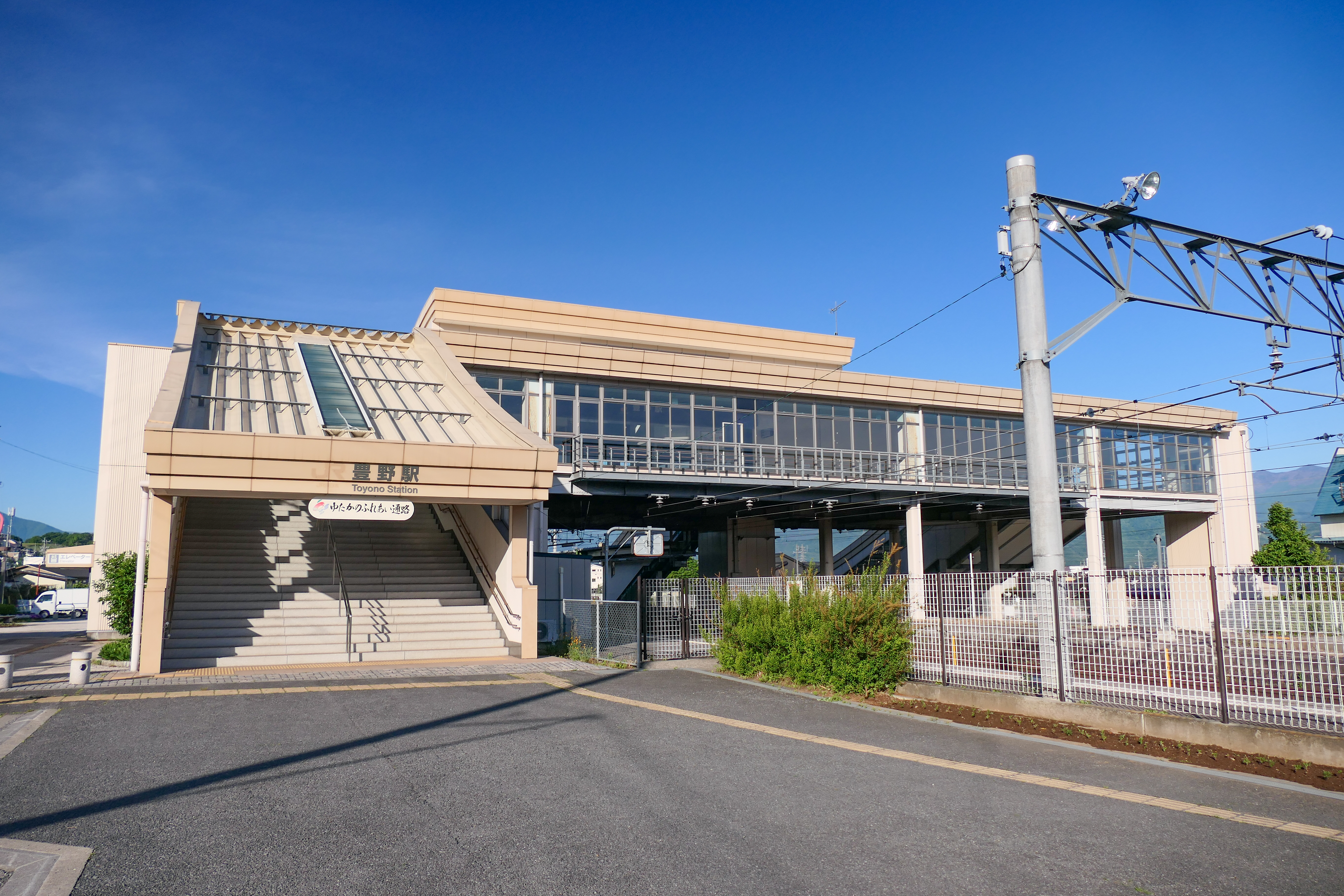
- Toyono Station in May 2022

General information
- Location: 1002 Toyono, Toyono-machi, Nagano-shi, Nagano-ken 389-1105; Japan
- Coordinates: 36.7114°N 138.2754°E
- Elevation: 334.6 metres (1,098 ft)
- Operator: Shinano Railway; JR East
- Lines: ■ Kita-Shinano Line; ■ Iiyama Line
- Distance: 10.8 kilometres (6.7 mi) from Nagano
- Platforms: 1 side + 1 island platforms
- Tracks: 3

Other information
- Status: Staffed

History
- Opened: 1 September 1898

Passengers
- FY2016: 1,320 daily (JR); 1,021 (Shinano Railway)

Services
Preceding station	JR East	Following station
Sansai towards Nagano	Iiyama Line	Shinano-Asano towards Echigo-Kawaguchi
Preceding station	Shinano Railway	Following station
Sansai towards Nagano	Kita-Shinano Line	Mure towards Myoko-Kogen
Location
- Location within Nagano Prefecture Location within Japan

Toyono Station (豊野駅, Toyono-eki) is a railway station in Toyono in the city of Nagano, Japan, jointly operated by the East Japan Railway Company (JR East) and the third-sector railway operating company Shinano Railway.

== Lines ==
Toyono Station forms a nominal terminus for the JR East Iiyama Line, although many trains continue past the station to Nagano. The station is also served by the 37.3 km Shinano Railway Kita-Shinano Line, lying 10.8 kilometers from the starting point of the line at Nagano Station.

== Station layout ==
The station has one side platform and one island platform serving three tracks, with an elevated station building built over the tracks. The station is staffed.

=== Platforms ===
1	■ Kita-Shinano Line	for Myōkō-Kōgen
1	■ Iiyama Line	for Togari-Nozawaonsen, Tōkamachi, and Echigo-Kawaguchi
2/3	■ Kita-Shinano Line	for Nagano
2/3	■ Iiyama Line	for Nagano

== History ==
The station opened on 1 May 1888. With the privatization of Japanese National Railways (JNR) on 1 April 1987, the station came under the control of East Japan Railway Company (JR East).

A new station building was completed in February 2007. From 14 March 2015, with the opening of the Hokuriku Shinkansen extension from Nagano to Kanazawa, local passenger operations over sections of the Shinetsu Main Line and Hokuriku Main Line running roughly parallel to the new Shinkansen line were reassigned to third-sector railway operating companies. From this date, Kita-Nagano Station was transferred to the ownership of the third-sector operating company Shinano Railway.

== Passenger statistics ==
In fiscal 2016, the JR portion of the station was used by an average of 1,320 passengers daily (JR East data, boarding passengers only).

In fiscal 2016, the Shinano Railway portion of station was used by an average of 1,021 passengers daily (boarding passengers only).

== Surrounding area ==
- Former Toyono Town Hall
- Chikuma River
- National Route 18

== See also ==
- List of railway stations in Japan
