= Echigo-Kawaguchi Station =

Railway station in Nagaoka, Niigata Prefecture, Japan

Echigo-Kawaguchi Station 越後川口駅
- Echigo-Kawaguchi Station in June 2026

General information
- Location: 693-1 Higashi-Kawaguchi, Nagaoka-shi, Niigata-ken 949-7504; Japan
- Coordinates: 37°16′23″N 138°51′43″E
- Elevation: 67.8 metres (222 ft)
- Operator: JR East
- Lines: ■ Jōetsu Line; ■ Iiyama Line
- Distance: 142.8 kilometres (88.7 mi) from Takasaki
- Platforms: 1 side + 1 island platform
- Tracks: 3

Other information
- Status: Staffed (Midori no Madoguchi)
- Website: Official website

History
- Opened: 5 August 1921; 105 years ago

Passengers
- FY2017: 197daily

Services
Preceding station	JR East	Following station
Kita-Horinouchi towards Takasaki	Jōetsu Line	Ojiya towards Nagaoka
Uchigamaki towards Nagano	Iiyama Line	Terminus
Location
- Location within Japan

Echigo-Kawaguchi Station (越後川口駅, Echigo-Kawaguchi-eki) is a railway station on the Joetsu Line in the city of Nagaoka, Niigata, Japan, operated by East Japan Railway Company (JR East).

== Lines ==
Echigo-Kawaguchi Station is served by the Joetsu Line and Iiyama Line. It is 142.8 km (88.7 mi) from the starting point of the Joetsu Line at Takasaki and also forms the terminus of the 96.7 km Iiyama Line.

== Station layout ==
The station consists of one ground-level side platform and one island platform serving three tracks. The platforms are connected by an underground passageway. The station has a Midori no Madoguchi staffed ticket office.

=== Platforms ===
1	■ Iiyama Line	for Tōkamachi, Togarinozawa-Onsen, and Nagano
2	■ Joetsu Line	for Nagaoka
3	■ Joetsu Line	for Echigo-Yuzawa, Echigo-Nakazato, and Minakami

== History ==
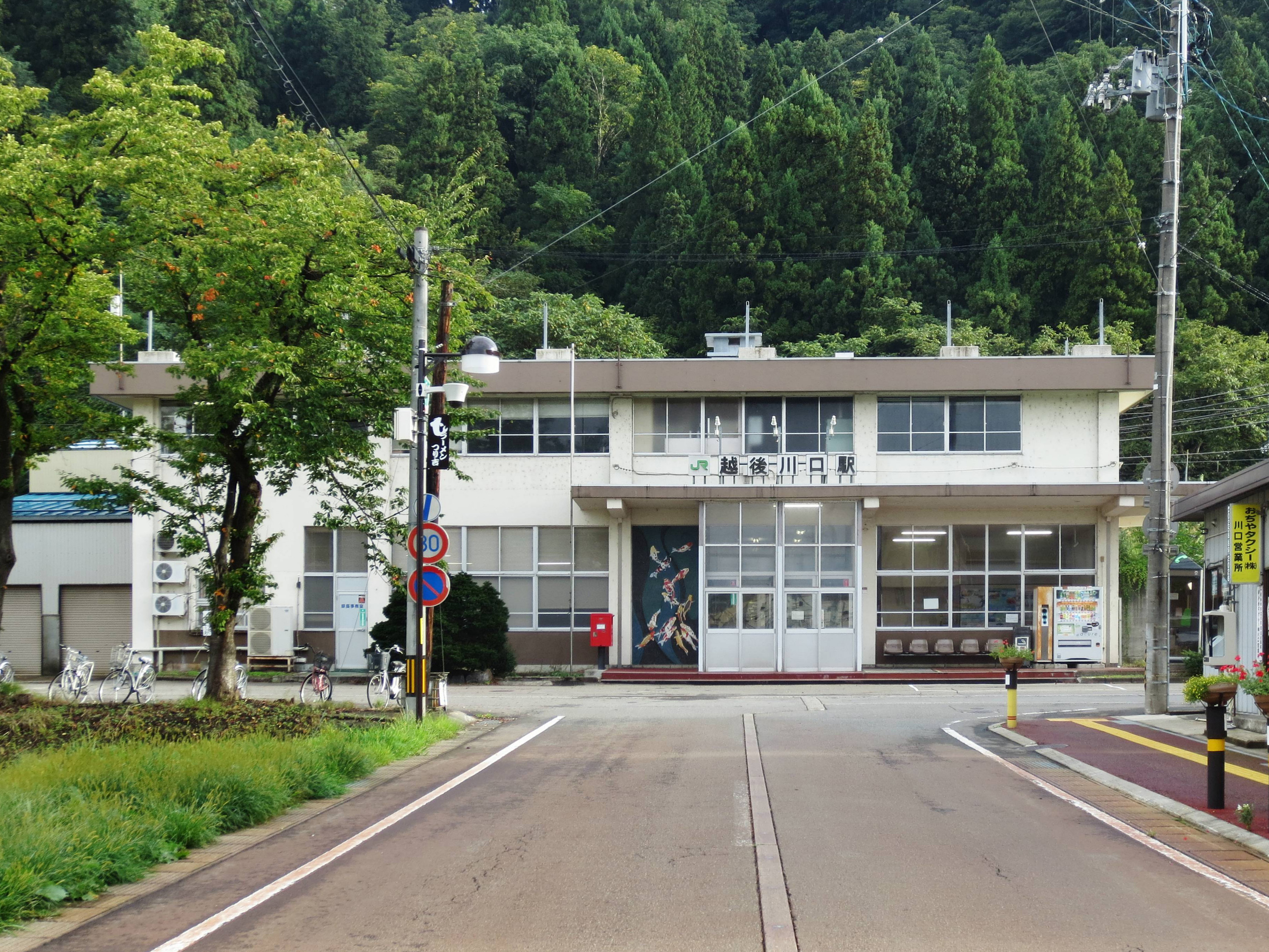
Echigo-Kawaguchi Station in September 2015

The station opened on 5 August 1921. With the privatization of Japanese National Railways (JNR) on 1 April 1987, the station came under the control of JR East.

The station building sustained some damage in the 2004 Chuetsu Earthquake, which hit on 23 October 2004.

== Passenger statistics ==
In fiscal 2017, the station was used by an average of 197 passengers daily (boarding passengers only).

== Surrounding area ==
- Former Kawaguchi Town Hall
- National Route 17

== See also ==
- List of railway stations in Japan
