= Matsudai, Niigata =

Matsudai 松代町
- Former municipality
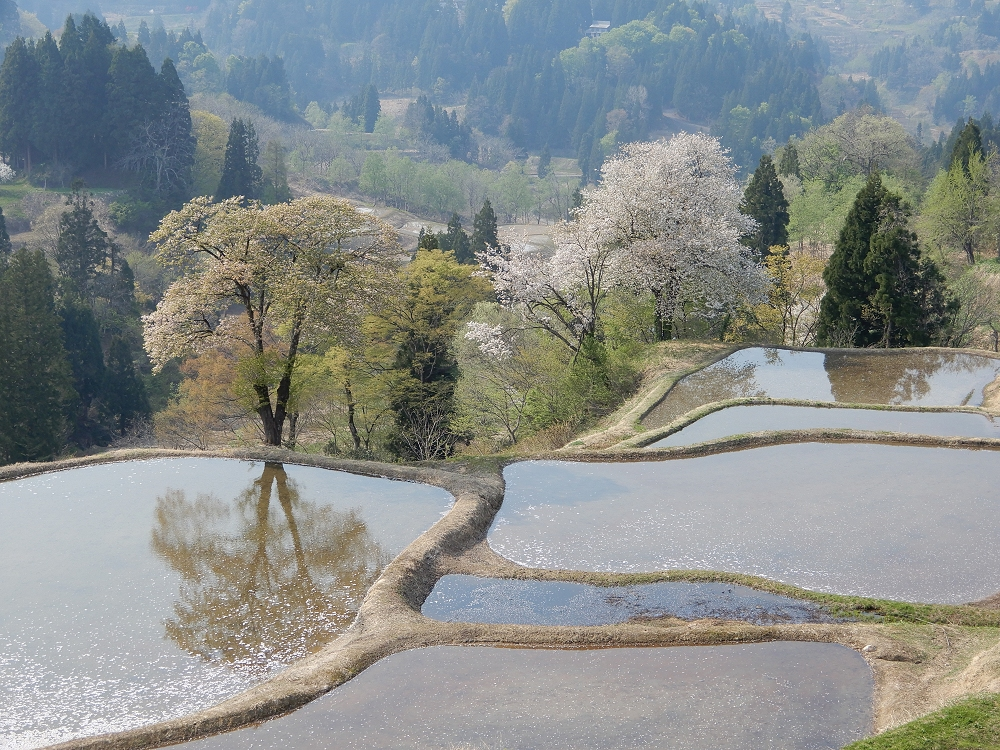
- Gimyo Rice Terrace

- Flag Emblem
- Interactive map of Matsudai
- Country: Japan
- Region: Hokuriku
- Prefecture: Niigata Prefecture
- District: Higashikubiki District
- Merged: April 1, 2005 (now part of Tōkamachi)

Area
  - Total: 90.47 km^{2} (34.93 sq mi)

Population (2003)
  - Total: 4,016
- Time zone: UTC+09:00 (JST)

5 former municipalities merged to create the new Tōkamachi City (yellow area)

Matsudai (松代町, Matsudai-machi) was a town located in Higashikubiki District, Niigata Prefecture, Japan.

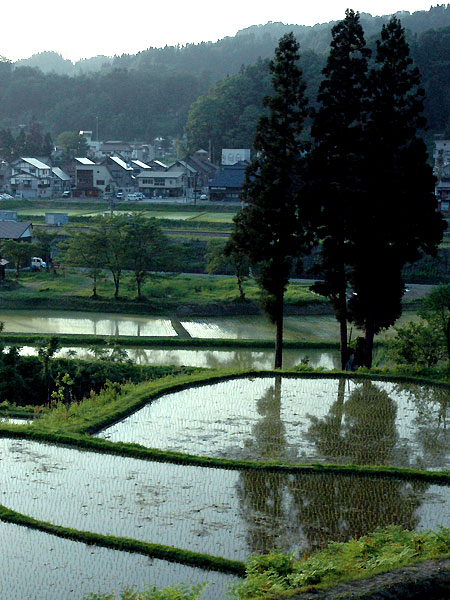
Matsudai, Niigata. June 2006.

As of 2003, the town had an estimated population of 4,016 and a density of 44.39 persons per km^{2}. The total area was 90.47 km^{2}.

On April 1, 2005, Matsudai, along with the town of Matsunoyama (also from Higashikubiki District), the town of Kawanishi, and the village of Nakasato, both from Nakauonuma District, was merged into the expanded city of Tōkamachi.

== Transportation ==
=== Railway ===
Hokuetsu Express Hokuhoku Line

- Matsudai

=== Highway ===
- National Route 253
- National Route 353
- National Route 403

== Local attractions ==
Matsudai is one of the sites of the Echigo-Tsumari Art Triennial, first held in 2000. The Matsudai Snow-Land Agrarian Culture Centre (aka Matsudai Nobutai) was built in 2003 by architects MVRDV as part of the Triennial and is the focal point for local contemporary art activities. The centre includes an event space, classroom, gallery, art shop, and restaurant.

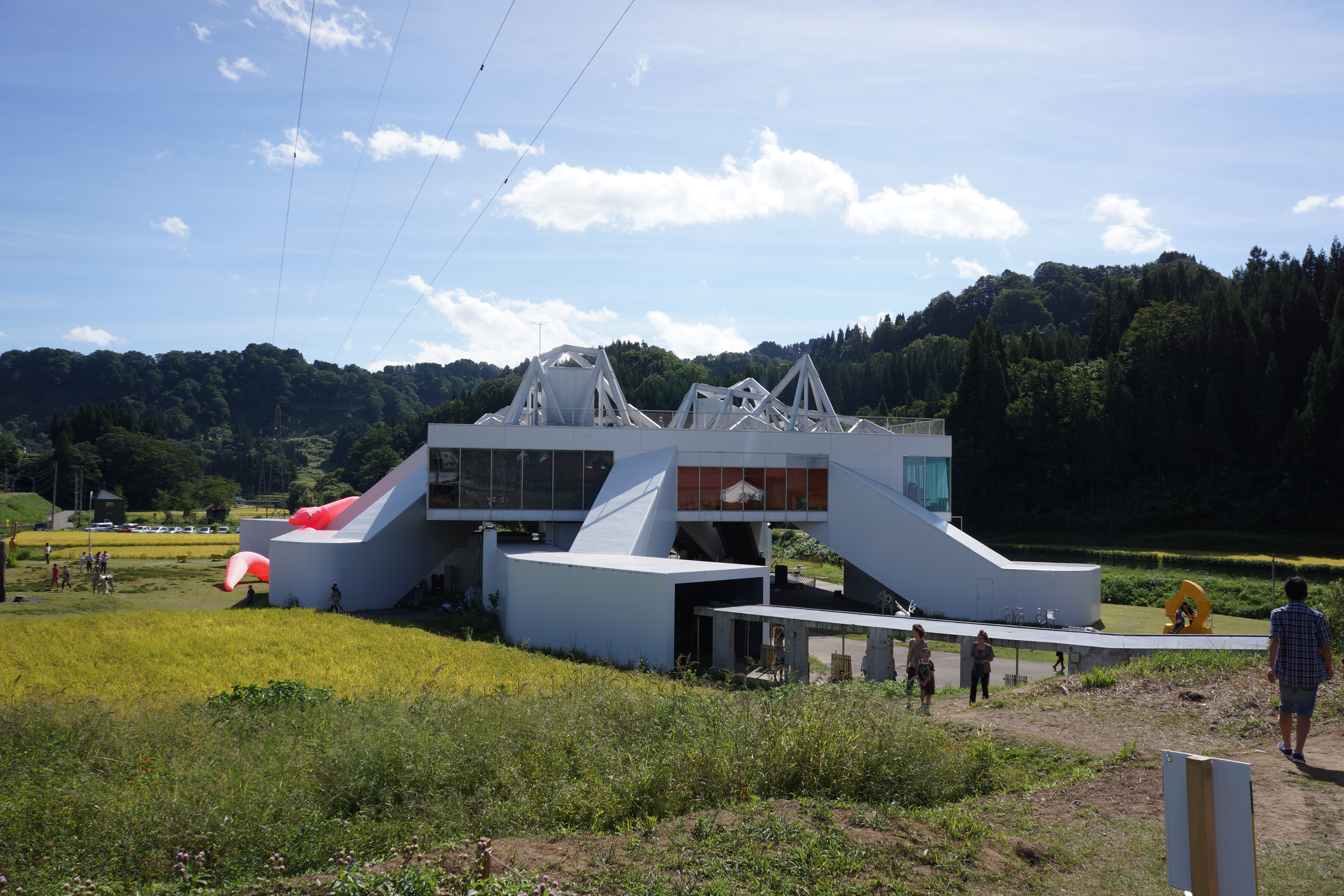
Matsudai Nohbutai

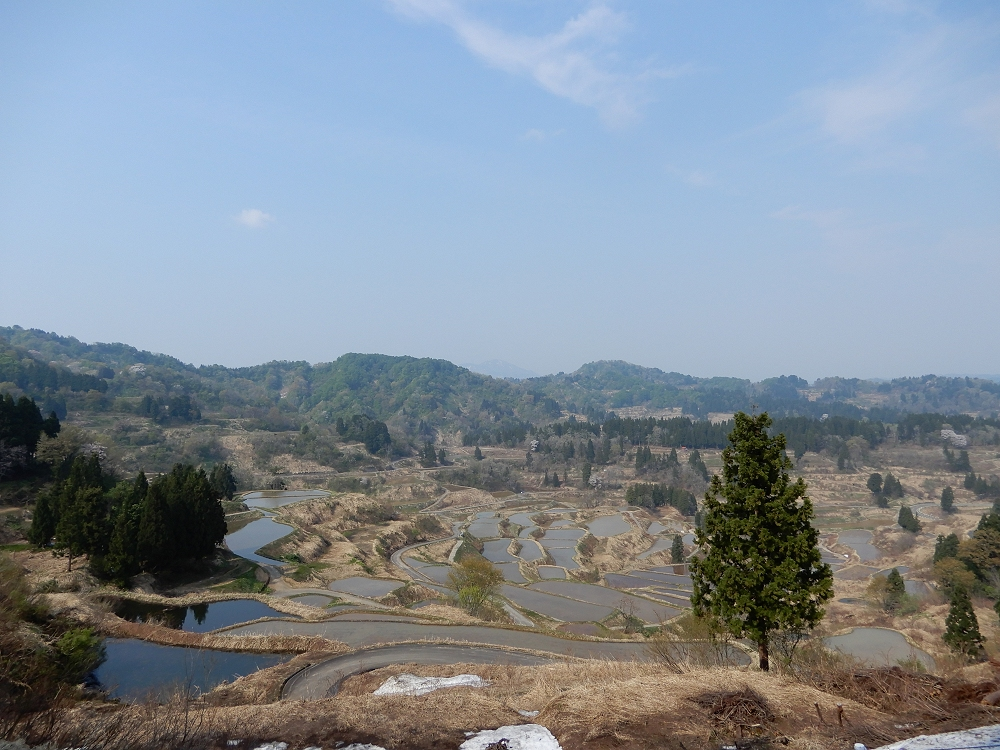
Hoshitoge Rice Terrace

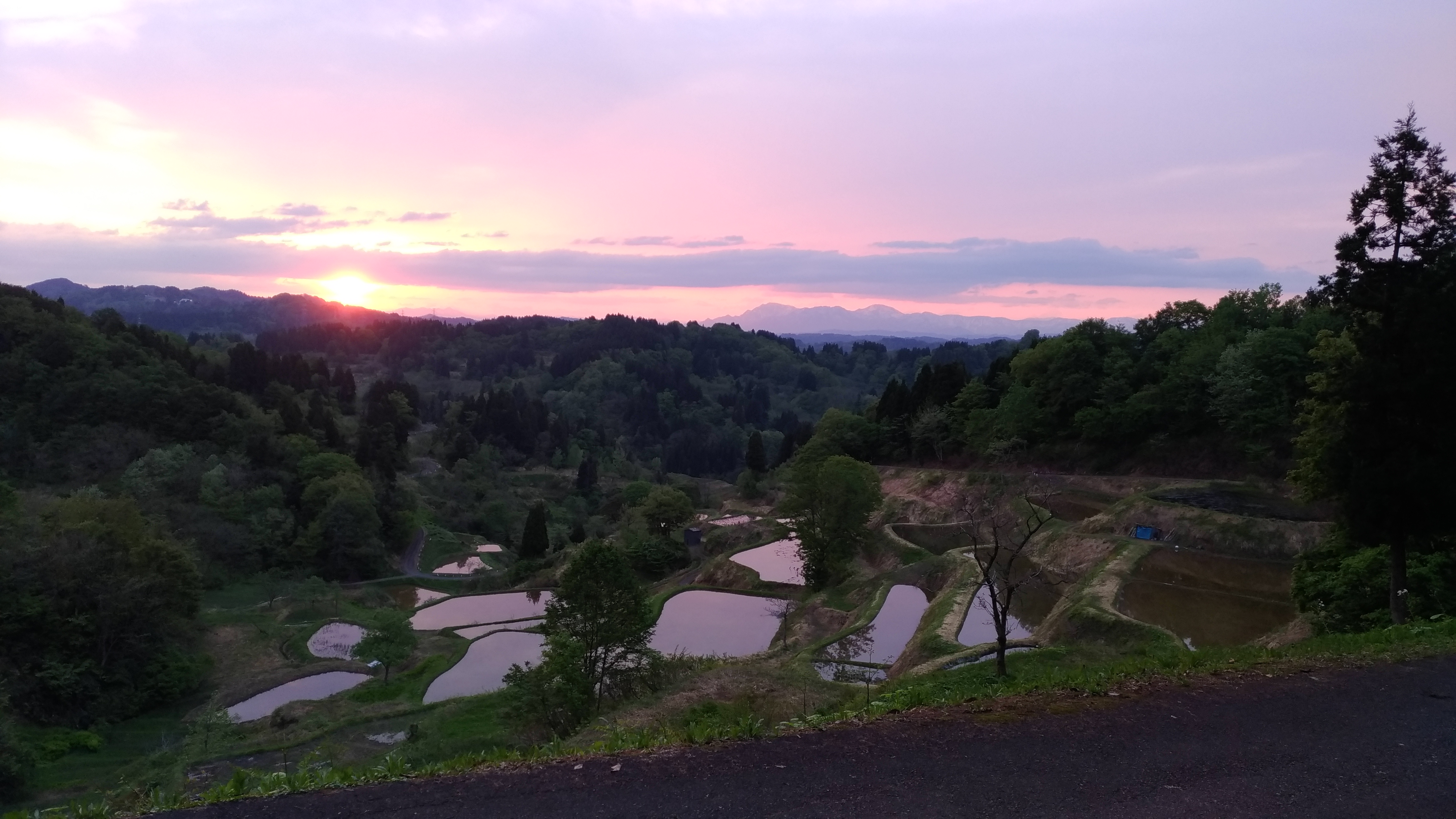
Gamo Rice Terrace
