= Matsunoyama, Niigata =

Matsunoyama 松之山町
- Former municipality
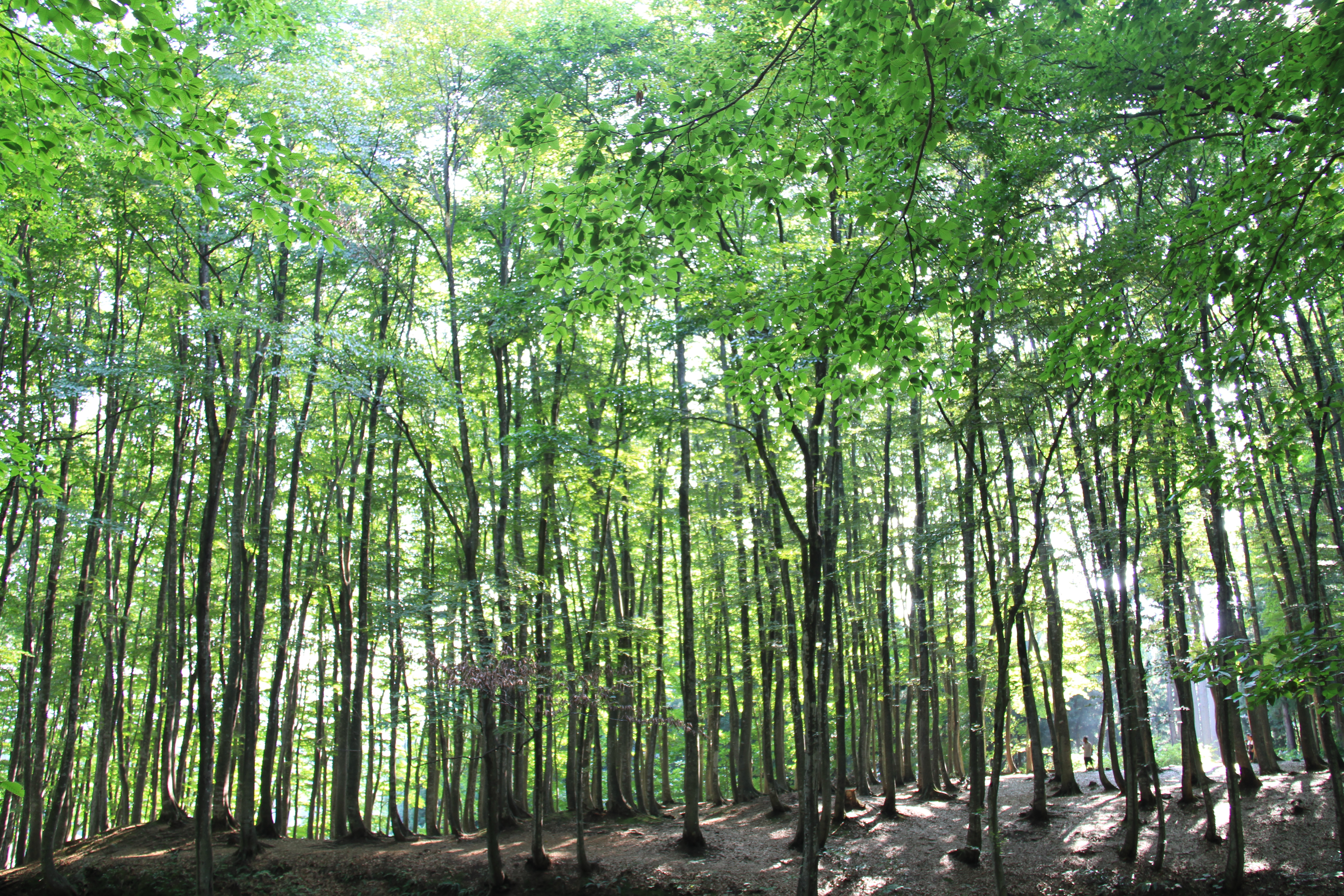
- Beech Forest

- Flag Emblem
- Interactive map of Matsunoyama
- Country: Japan
- Region: Hokuriku
- Prefecture: Niigata Prefecture
- District: Higashikubiki District
- Merged: April 1, 2005 (now part of Tōkamachi)

Area
  - Total: 86.31 km^{2} (33.32 sq mi)

Population (2003)
  - Total: 2,974
- Time zone: UTC+09:00 (JST)

5 former municipalities merged to create the new Tōkamachi City (yellow area)

Matsunoyama (松之山町, Matsunoyama-machi) was a town located in Higashikubiki District, Niigata Prefecture, Japan.

As of 2003, the town had an estimated population of 2,974 and a density of 34.46 persons per km^{2}. The total area was 86.31 km^{2}.

On April 1, 2005, Matsunoyama, along with the town of Matsudai (also from Higashikubiki District), the town of Kawanishi, and the village of Nakasato (both from Nakauonuma District), was merged into the expanded city of Tōkamachi. It is located in the southeastern portion of the city.

Matsunoyama is home to one of the big three medicinal hot springs of Japan, along with Kusatsu (Gunma Prefecture) and Arima Onsen (Hyōgo Prefecture). One of the main roads in the town is lined with about a dozen traditional Japanese-style hot spring resorts, attracting many visitors.

== Climate ==
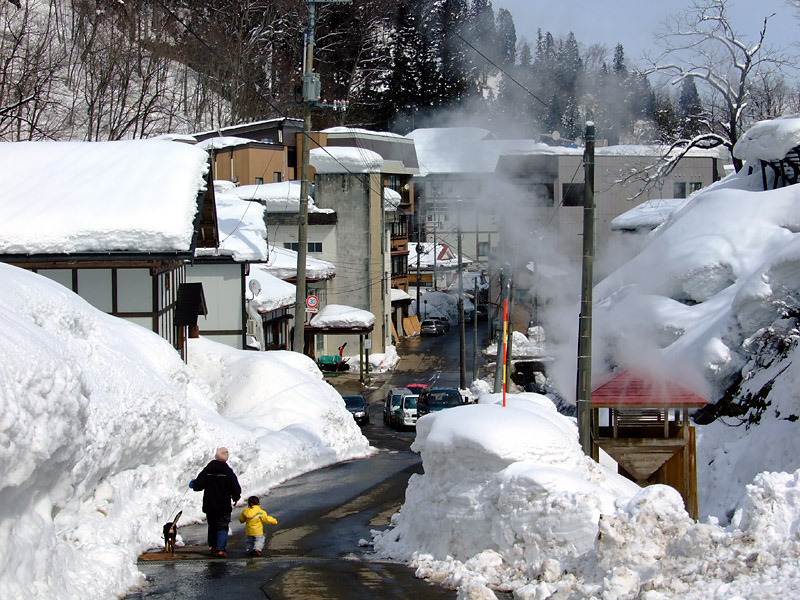
Matsunoyama Onsen covered with snow

Matsunoyama is also famous for the massive amount of snowfall it receives, with 2 to 3 meters on average during the severe winter months.

== History ==
According to legend, a woodcutter discovered the hot springs 700 years ago when he saw a hawk resting its injured wing in it. It has also been told that the daughter of Uesugi Fusayoshi (the 15th century governor of Echigo Province, current Niigata Prefecture, ja:上杉房能) cured her skin disease by soaking in the hot springs.

== Transportation ==
=== Highway ===
- National Route 353
- National Route 403

== Local attractions ==
Matsunoyama is one of the sites of the Echigo-Tsumari Art Triennial.

- Matsunoyama Onsen (ja:松之山温泉)
- Beech Forest (Bijin Bayashi, ja:美人林)
- Rice terraces
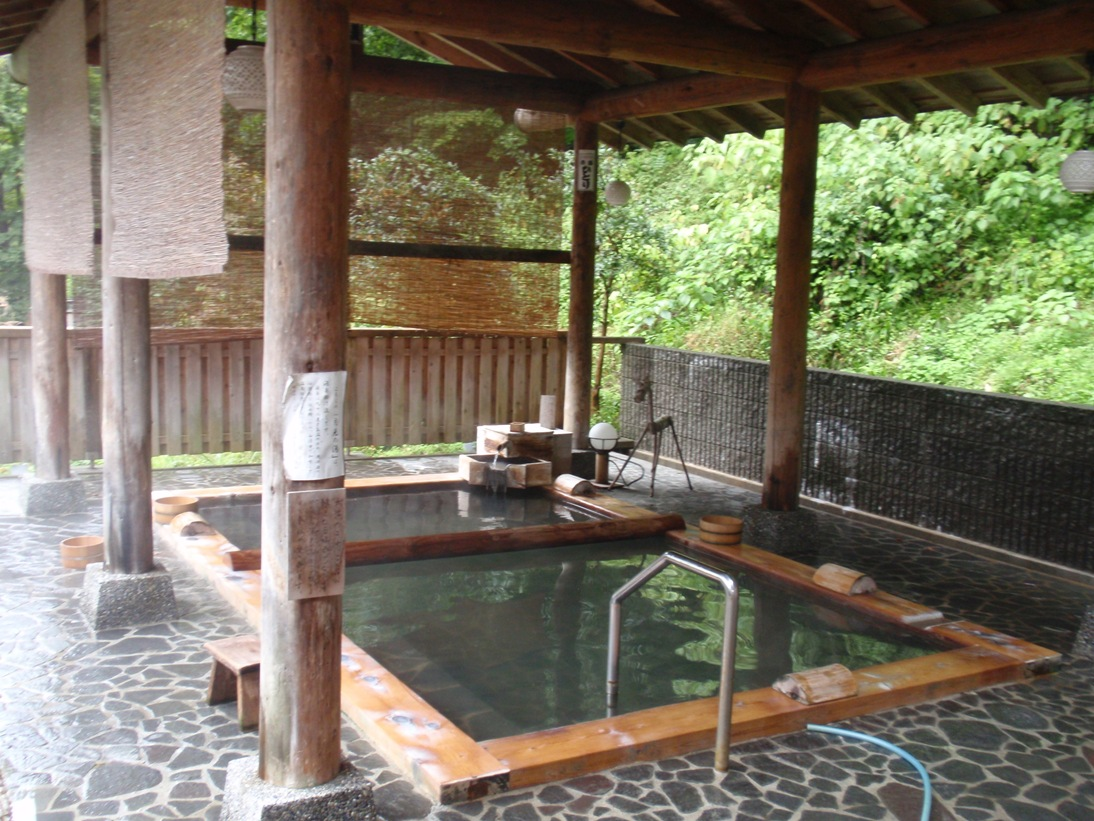
Matsunoyama Onsen

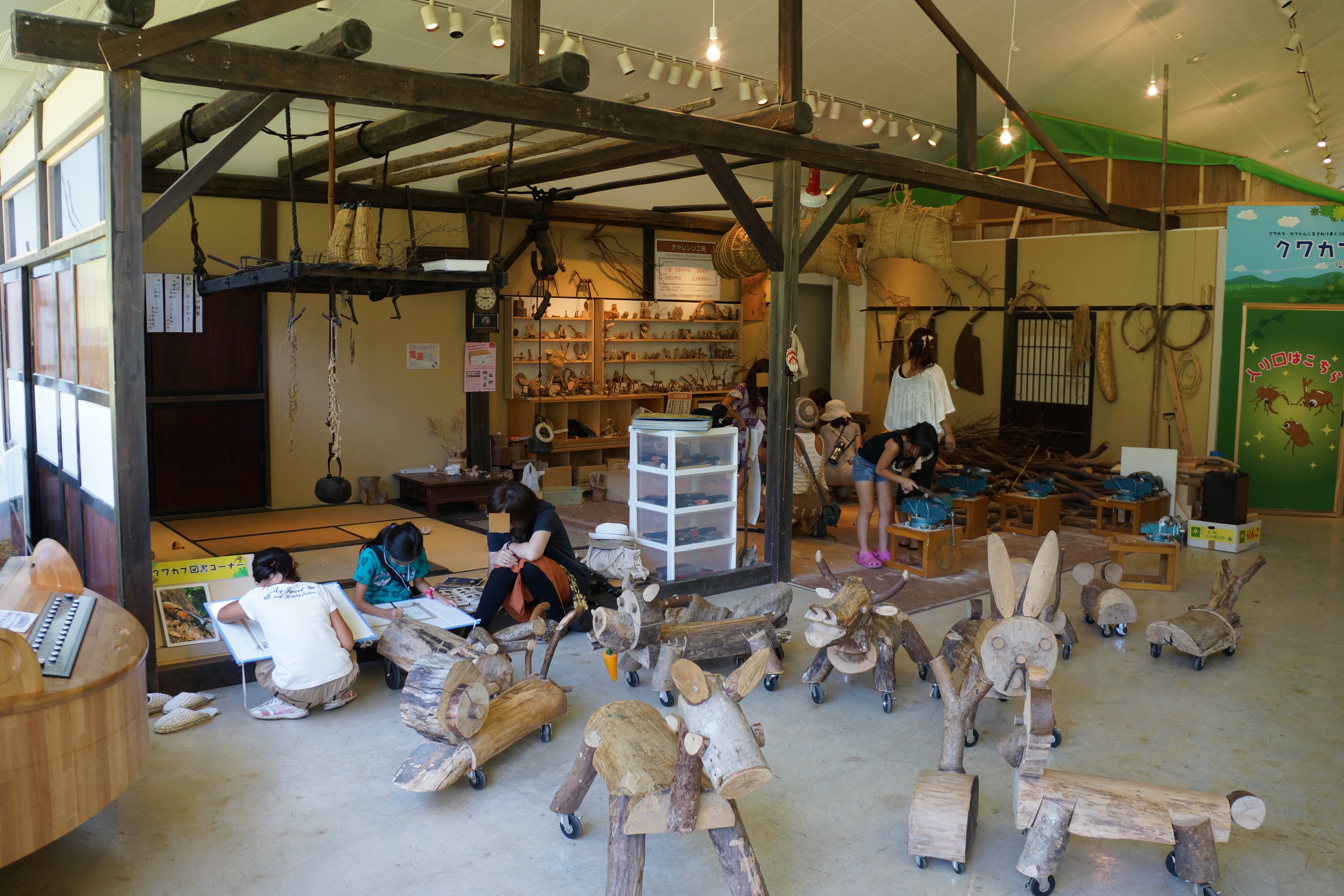
Kyororo Museum

== See also ==
- Tōkamachi
