= Nakasato, Niigata =

Nakasato 中里村
- Former municipality
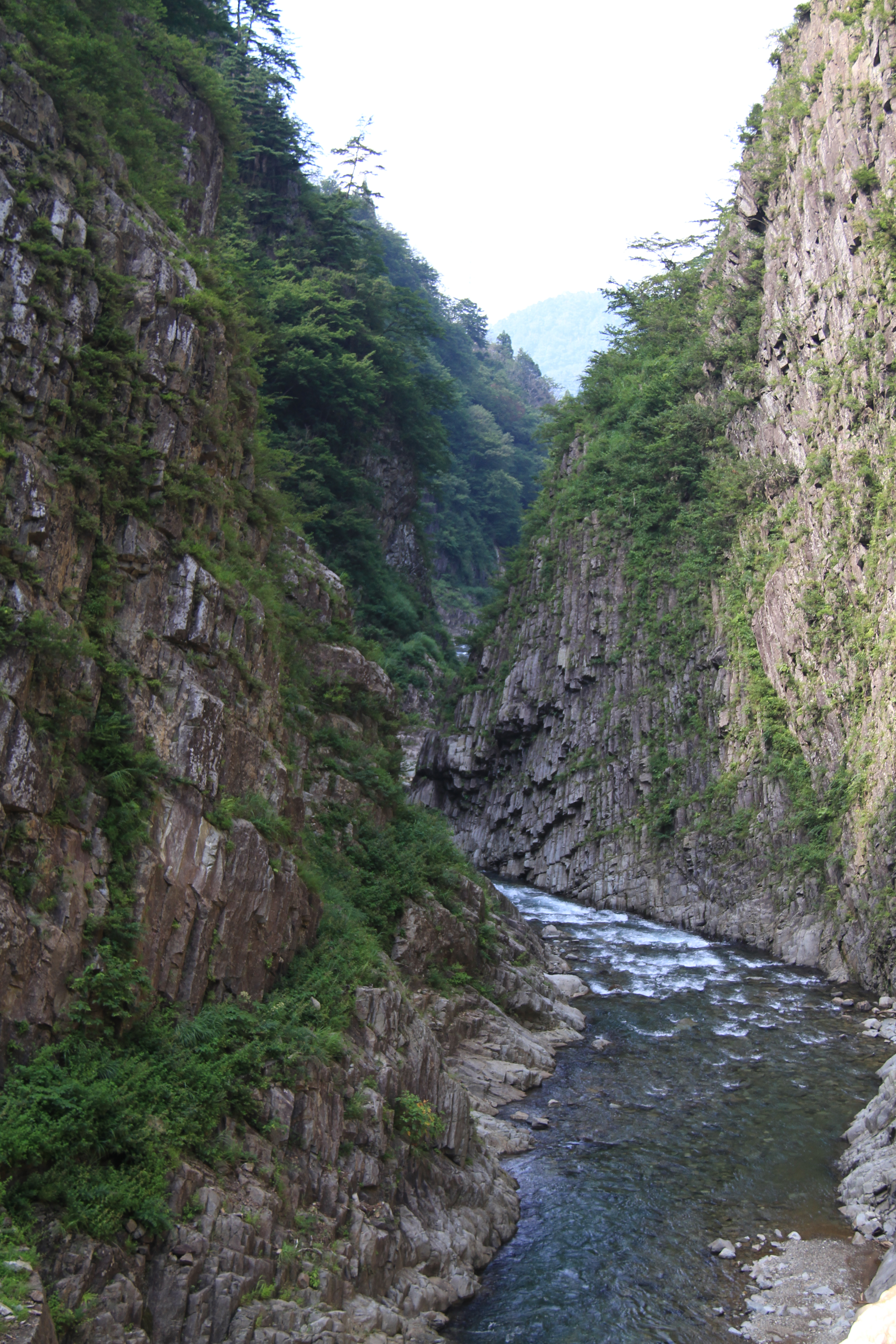
- Kiyotsu Gorge

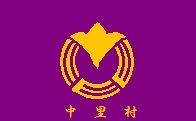
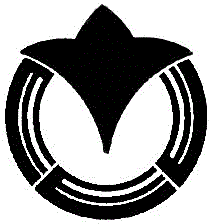
- Flag Seal
- Interactive map of Nakasato
- Country: Japan
- Region: Hokuriku
- Prefecture: Niigata Prefecture
- District: Nakauonuma District
- Merged: April 1, 2005 (now part of Tōkamachi)

Area
  - Total: 128.97 km^{2} (49.80 sq mi)

Population (2003)
  - Total: 6,171
- Time zone: UTC+09:00 (JST)

5 former municipalities merged to create the new Tōkamachi City (yellow area)

Nakasato (中里村, Nakasato-mura) was a village located in Nakauonuma District, Niigata Prefecture, Japan.

As of 2003, the village had an estimated population of 6,171 and a density of 47.85 persons per km^{2}. The total area was 128.97 km^{2}.

On April 1, 2005, Nakasato, along with the towns of Matsudai and Matsunoyama (both from Higashikubiki District), and the town of Kawanishi (also from Nakauonuma District), was merged into the expanded city of Tōkamachi.

== Transportation ==
=== Railway ===
JR East - Iiyama Line

- Echigo-Tazawa

=== Highway ===
- National Route 117
- National Route 353

== Local attractions ==
Nakasato is one of the sites of the Echigo-Tsumari Art Triennial.

- Kiyotsu Gorge (Kiyotsukyo, ja:清津峡)

== See also ==
- Tōkamachi
