= Echigo-Tazawa Station =

Railway station in Tōkamachi, Niigata Prefecture, Japan

Echigo-Tazawa Station 越後田沢駅
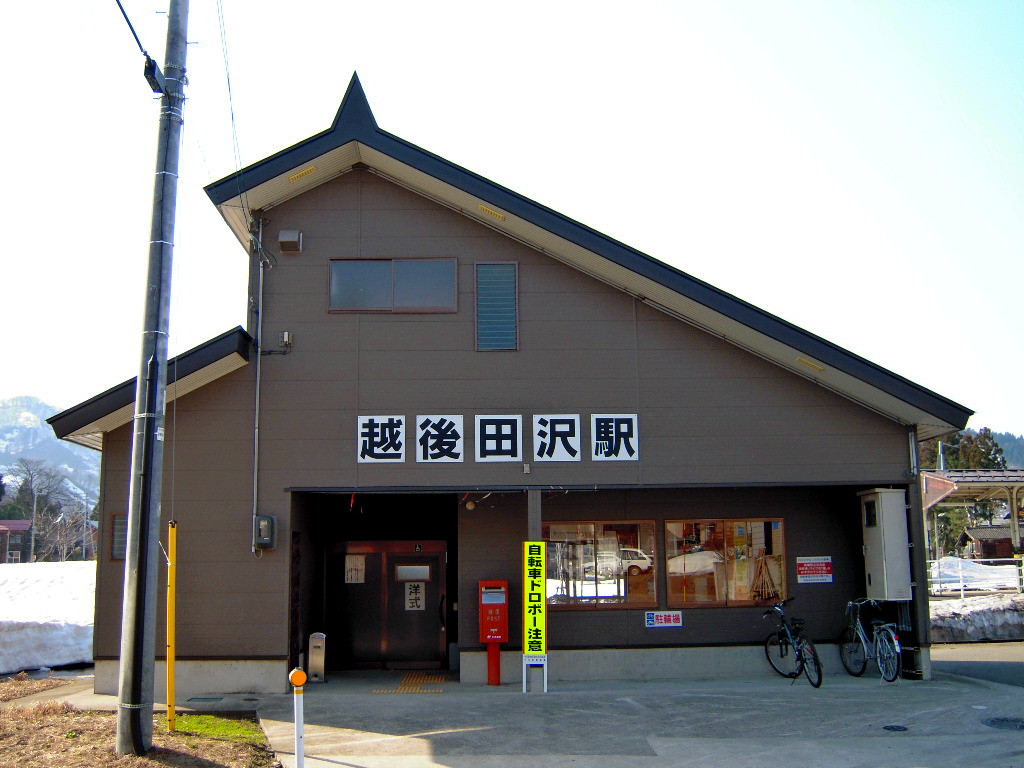
- Echigo-Tazawa Station in April 2010

General information
- Location: Tanaka, Tōkamachi-shi, Niigata-ken 949-8407; Japan
- Coordinates: 37.0554°N 138.6947°E
- Operator: JR East
- Line: ■ Iiyama Line
- Distance: 64.5 kilometres (40.1 mi) from Toyono
- Platforms: 1 side platform

Other information
- Status: unstaffed
- Website: www.jreast.co.jp/estation/station/info.aspx?StationCd=277

History
- Opened: 6 November 1927

Services
Preceding station	JR East	Following station
Echigo-Shikawatari towards Nagano	Iiyama Line	Echigo-Mizusawa towards Echigo-Kawaguchi
Location
- Location within Japan

Echigo-Tazawa Station (越後田沢駅, Echigo-Tazawa-eki) is a railway station in the city of Tōkamachi, Niigata, Japan operated by East Japan Railway Company (JR East).

== Lines ==
Echigo-Tazawa Station is served by the Iiyama Line, and is 64.5 kilometers from the starting point of the line at Toyono Station.

== Station layout ==
The station consists of a single side platform serving one bi-directional track. The station is unattended.

== History ==
Echigo-Tazawa Station opened on 6 November 1927. With the privatization of Japanese National Railways (JNR) on 1 April 1987, the station came under the control of JR East. A new station building was completed in 2001.

== Surrounding area ==
- National Route 117
- National Route 373
- former Nakasato village hall
- Nishiotaki Dam

== See also ==
- List of railway stations in Japan
