= Tōkamachi =

Tōkamachi 十日町市
- City
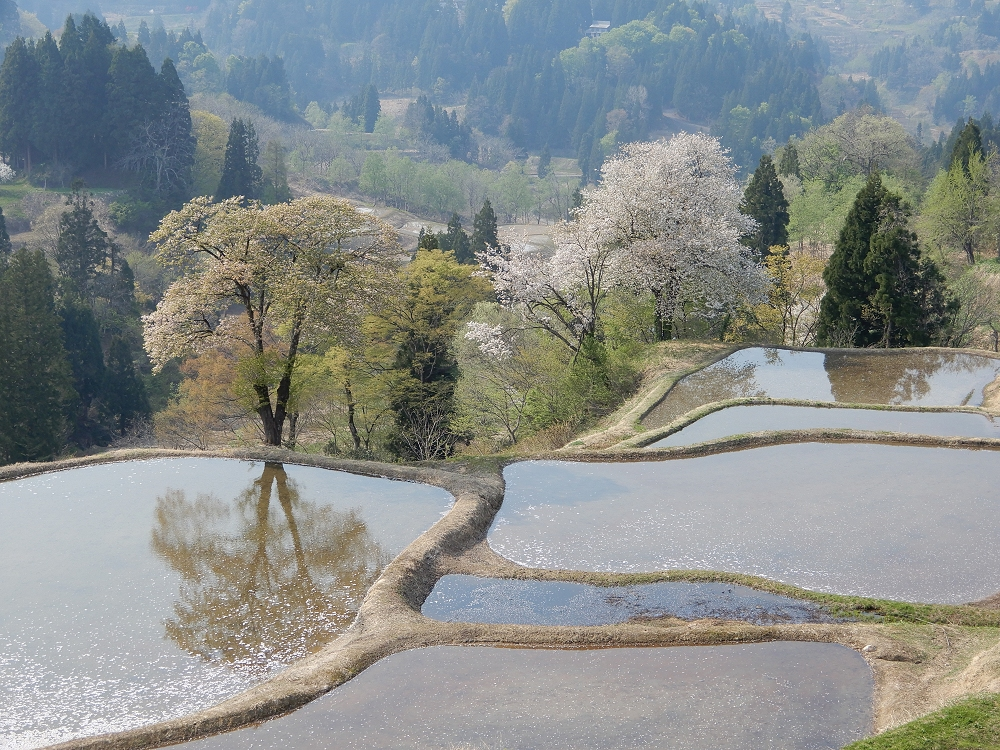
- Gimyo Rice Terrace

- Flag Seal

- Location of Tōkamachi in Niigata

- Coordinates: 37°8′0″N 138°45′0″E
- Country: Japan
- Region: Chūbu (Kōshin'etsu) (Hokuriku)
- Prefecture: Niigata

Government
  - Mayor: Yoshifumi Sekiguchi

Area
  - Total: 590.39 km^{2} (227.95 sq mi)

Population (28th February 2025)
  - Total: 46,909
  - Density: 79.454/km^{2} (205.79/sq mi)
- Time zone: UTC+9 (Japan Standard Time)
- Phone number: 025-757-3111
- Address: 3-3 Chitose, Tokamachi-shi, Niigata-ken 948-8501
- Climate: Cfa
- Website: Official website
- Symbols
- Bird: Swan
- Flower: Lilium
- Tree: Fagus crenata

Yellow: 5 areas/sections in Tōkamachi City (Tōkamachi, Kawanishi, Matsudai, Matsunoyama and Nakasato)

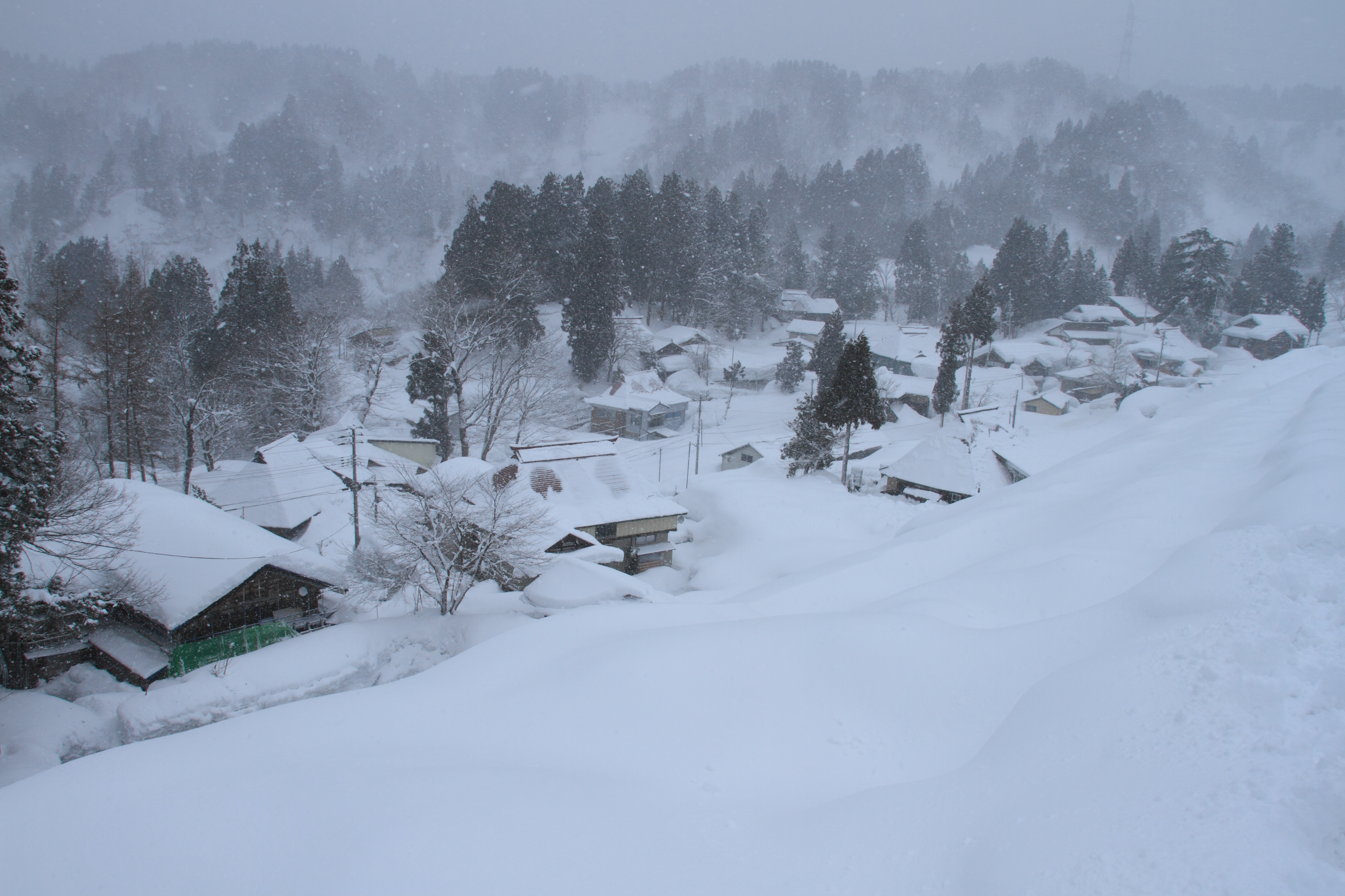
Koshirakura, Tōkamachi in winter

Tōkamachi (十日町市, Tōkamachi-shi) is a city located in Niigata Prefecture, Japan. As of 1 July 2019, the city had an estimated population of 28,728 in 19,823 households, and a population density of 86.3 persons per km^{2}. The total area of the city was 590.39 square kilometres (227.95 sq mi), although some borders of the city are not well defined. Tōkamachi derives its name from the fact that a market was held every tenth day of the month. Similarly, the nearby former town of Muikamachi had its own local market held on days ending in six each month.

== Geography ==
Tōkamachi is located in an inland region of southwest Niigata Prefecture. Parts of the city are within the borders of the Jōshin'etsu-kōgen National Park.

=== Surrounding municipalities ===
- Nagano Prefecture
  - Sakae
- Niigata Prefecture
  - Jōetsu
  - Kashiwazaki
  - Minamiuonuma
  - Nagaoka
  - Ojiya
  - Uonuma
  - Tsunan
  - Yuzawa

== Climate ==
Tōkamachi has a humid continental climate (Köppen Dfa) characterized by warm, wet summers and cold winters with heavy snowfall. The average annual temperature in Tōkamachi is 11.8 °C (53.2 °F). The average annual rainfall is 2,537.0 mm (99.88 in) with September as the wettest month. The temperatures are highest on average in August, at around 24.9 °C (76.8 °F), and lowest in January, at around −0.1 °C (31.8 °F). Because Tōkamachi lies in a valley, wind patterns bring in clouds from both the Sea of Japan as well as the Pacific Ocean. The mountains surrounding the city (though not terribly high in altitude) act as any other mountains that affect rain and snow patterns providing a barrier for cloud patterns. This causes a great deal of the built up precipitation to drop on the city. The Tōkamachi area receives the most snow of any area on the main island of Honshu.

Climate data for Tōkamachi (elevation 170 m, 1991–2020 normals, extremes 1978–present)
Month	Jan	Feb	Mar	Apr	May	Jun	Jul	Aug	Sep	Oct	Nov	Dec	Year
Record high °C (°F)	14.1 (57.4)	16.8 (62.2)	22.6 (72.7)	30.4 (86.7)	32.8 (91.0)	37.1 (98.8)	36.1 (97.0)	37.0 (98.6)	35.5 (95.9)	32.4 (90.3)	25.5 (77.9)	20.5 (68.9)	37.1 (98.8)
Mean daily maximum °C (°F)	3.0 (37.4)	3.9 (39.0)	7.7 (45.9)	15.3 (59.5)	22.1 (71.8)	25.3 (77.5)	28.6 (83.5)	30.2 (86.4)	25.8 (78.4)	19.7 (67.5)	13.1 (55.6)	6.2 (43.2)	16.8 (62.2)
Daily mean °C (°F)	−0.1 (31.8)	0.1 (32.2)	2.8 (37.0)	8.9 (48.0)	15.9 (60.6)	20.1 (68.2)	23.8 (74.8)	24.9 (76.8)	20.7 (69.3)	14.4 (57.9)	8.1 (46.6)	2.5 (36.5)	11.8 (53.2)
Mean daily minimum °C (°F)	−2.9 (26.8)	−3.3 (26.1)	−1.3 (29.7)	3.5 (38.3)	10.3 (50.5)	15.8 (60.4)	20.1 (68.2)	20.9 (69.6)	16.7 (62.1)	10.3 (50.5)	4.0 (39.2)	−0.4 (31.3)	7.8 (46.0)
Record low °C (°F)	−12.1 (10.2)	−12.8 (9.0)	−9.2 (15.4)	−5.0 (23.0)	1.3 (34.3)	6.3 (43.3)	13.0 (55.4)	12.6 (54.7)	6.2 (43.2)	0.4 (32.7)	−4.7 (23.5)	−10.6 (12.9)	−12.8 (9.0)
Average precipitation mm (inches)	392.4 (15.45)	262.2 (10.32)	177.7 (7.00)	111.2 (4.38)	100.5 (3.96)	135.6 (5.34)	220.9 (8.70)	183.3 (7.22)	168.7 (6.64)	167.4 (6.59)	233.7 (9.20)	397.8 (15.66)	2,537 (99.88)
Average snowfall cm (inches)	354 (139)	263 (104)	139 (55)	25 (9.8)	0 (0)	0 (0)	0 (0)	0 (0)	0 (0)	0 (0)	7 (2.8)	193 (76)	967 (381)
Average precipitation days (≥ 1.0 mm)	25.0	21.1	19.6	13.8	11.6	12.4	15.1	12.3	13.7	14.9	18.3	22.9	200.8
Mean monthly sunshine hours	45.7	66.6	109.9	169.1	205.8	158.1	148.6	191.9	137.8	130.1	100.9	62.9	1,527.5
Source: Japan Meteorological Agency (1991–2020 normals, extremes 1978–present)

== Demographics ==
Per Japanese census data, the population of Tōkamachi has declined steadily over the past 50 years.

Historical population
Year	Pop.	±%
1970	85,365	—
1980	78,791	−7.7%
1990	70,938	−10.0%
2000	65,033	−8.3%
2010	58,911	−9.4%
2020	49,820	−15.4%

== History ==
The area of present-day Tōkamachi was part of ancient Echigo Province, and was part of the tenryō territories held directly by then Tokugawa shogunate. Following the Meiji restoration, was the capital of the newly-formed Nakauonuma District of Niigata Prefecture, and was proclaimed a village on April 1, 1889 with the creation of the modern municipalities system. It was raised to town status on September 24, 1897. Tōkamachi gained city status on March 31, 1954, by merging with the neighbouring villages of Nakajō, Kawaji and Rokka. The village of Yoshida (from Nakauonuma District) was annexed on December 1, 1954 followed by the village of Shimojō (from Nakauonuma District) on February 1, 1955. On April 1, 1962 - Tōkamachi absorbed the village of Mizusawa (from Nakauonuma District). The Chūetsu earthquake of October 23, 2004 caused only minor damage to the city. On April 1, 2005 Tōkamachi absorbed the towns of Matsudai and Matsunoyama (both from Higashikubiki District); the town of Kawanishi, and the village of Nakasato (both from Nakauonuma District) to create the new and expanded city of Tōkamachi.

== Government ==
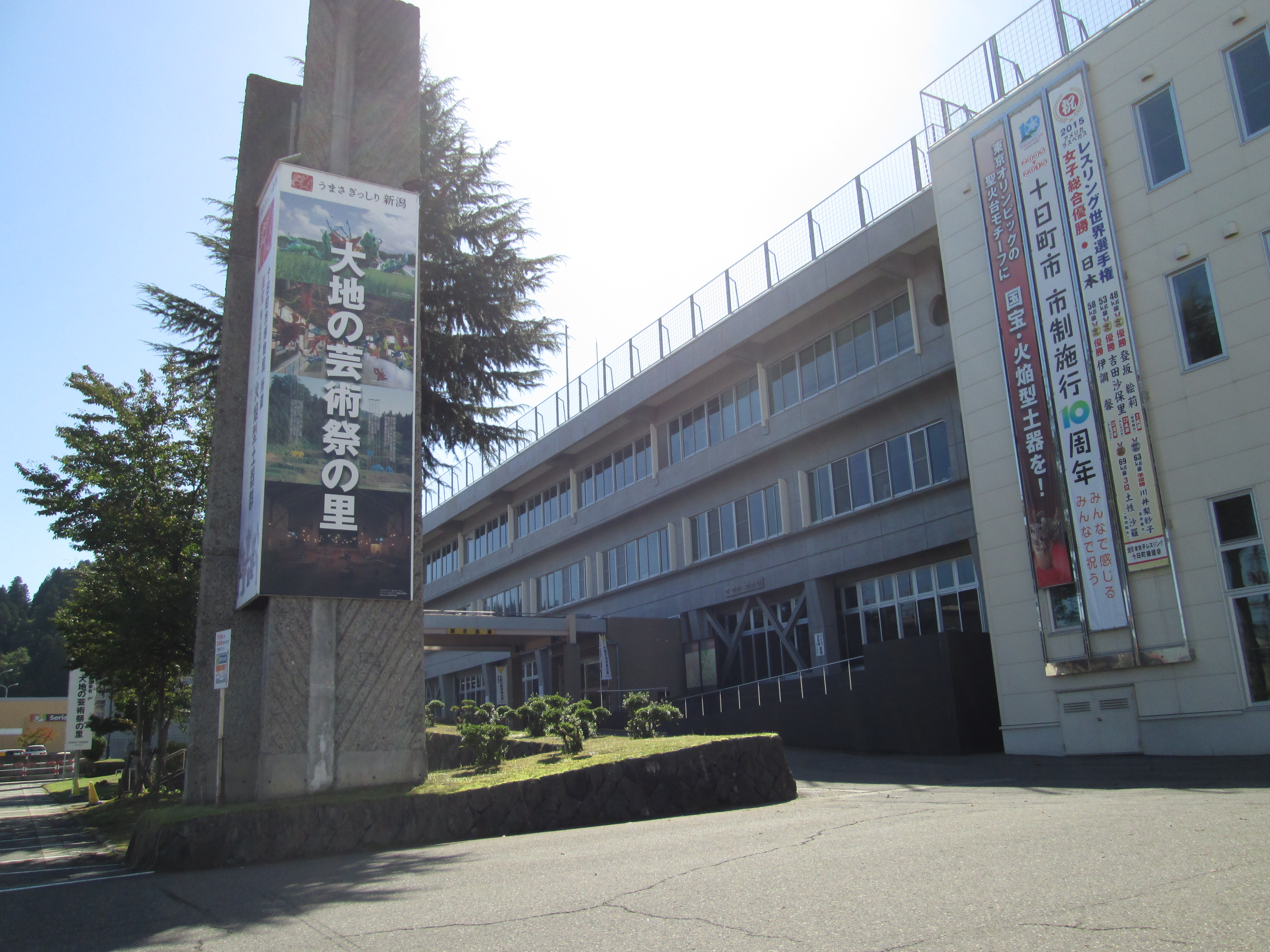
Tokamachi City Hall

Tōkamachi has a mayor-council form of government with a directly elected mayor and a unicameral city legislature of 24 members. The city contributes two members to the Niigata Prefectural Assembly. In terms of national politics, the city is part of Niigata District No.6 of the lower house of the National Diet of Japan.

== Economy ==
Sericulture and the production of silk is a traditional mainstay of the local economy. Tōkamachi's status as a silk production hub subsequently made it a prominent producer of kimonos, although that has faded in recent years. Agriculture, notably the cultivation of koshihikari rice, is also an important local product.

== Education ==
Tōkamachi has 18 public elementary schools and nine public middle schools operated by the city government and one private elementary and one private middle school. There are four public high schools operated by the Niigata Prefectural Board of Education. The prefectural also operates three special education schools.

== Transportation ==
=== Railway ===
Hokuetsu Express Hokuhoku Line

- Misashima - Shinza - Tōkamachi - Matsudai

JR East - – Iiyama Line

- Echigo-Tazawa - Echigo-Mizusawa - Doichi - Tōkamachi - Uonuma-Nakajō - Gejō

=== Highway ===
- National Route 117
- National Route 252
- National Route 253
- National Route 353
- National Route 403
- National Route 405

== Sister cities ==
=== International ===
- Como, Italy, since February 27, 1975

=== Domestic ===
- (Japan) Sapporo, Hokkaido
- (Japan) Shibushi, Kagoshima
- (Japan) Wako, Saitama
- (Japan) Yokohama, Kanagawa
  - All signed on August 27, 2004

== Notable people from Tōkamachi ==
- Maki Miyamae, Japanese pop singer, professional chef and restaurateur
- Toshiei Mizuochi, Japanese politician
- Shuichi Shigeno, Japanese mangaka
- Genichi Taguchi, Japanese engineer and statistician
- Kōji Takahashi, Japanese actor

== Local attractions ==
- Tōkamachi is home to the Tōkamachi Snow Festival, which takes place every February.
- Tōkamachi also hosts the Echigo-Tsumari Art Triennial
- Bijinbayashi
- Kiyotsu Gorge
- Rice Terraces (Hoshitoge, Gimyo, Gamo)
- Matsunoyama Onsen
- Mithila Museum
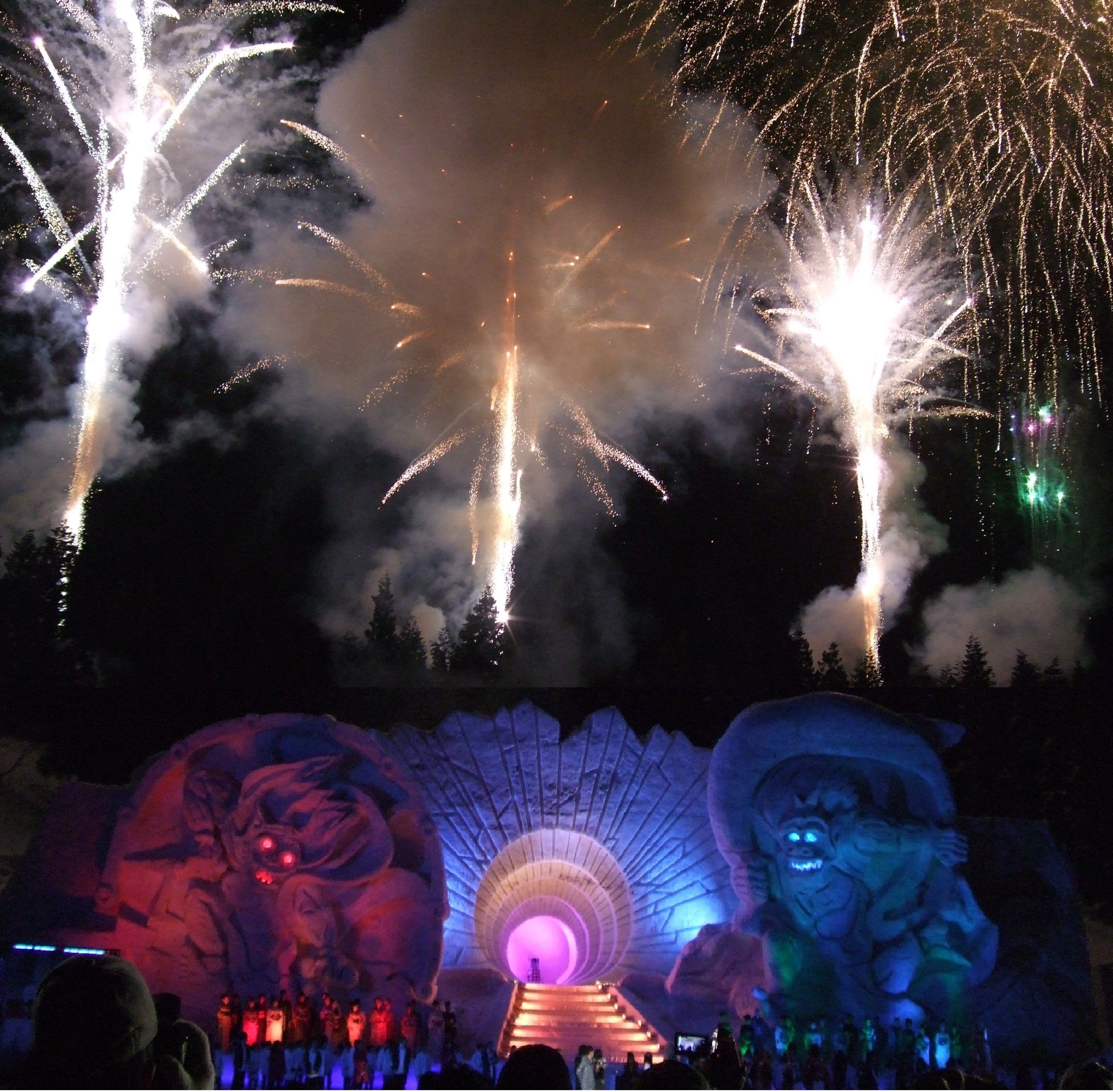
Tokamachi snow festival

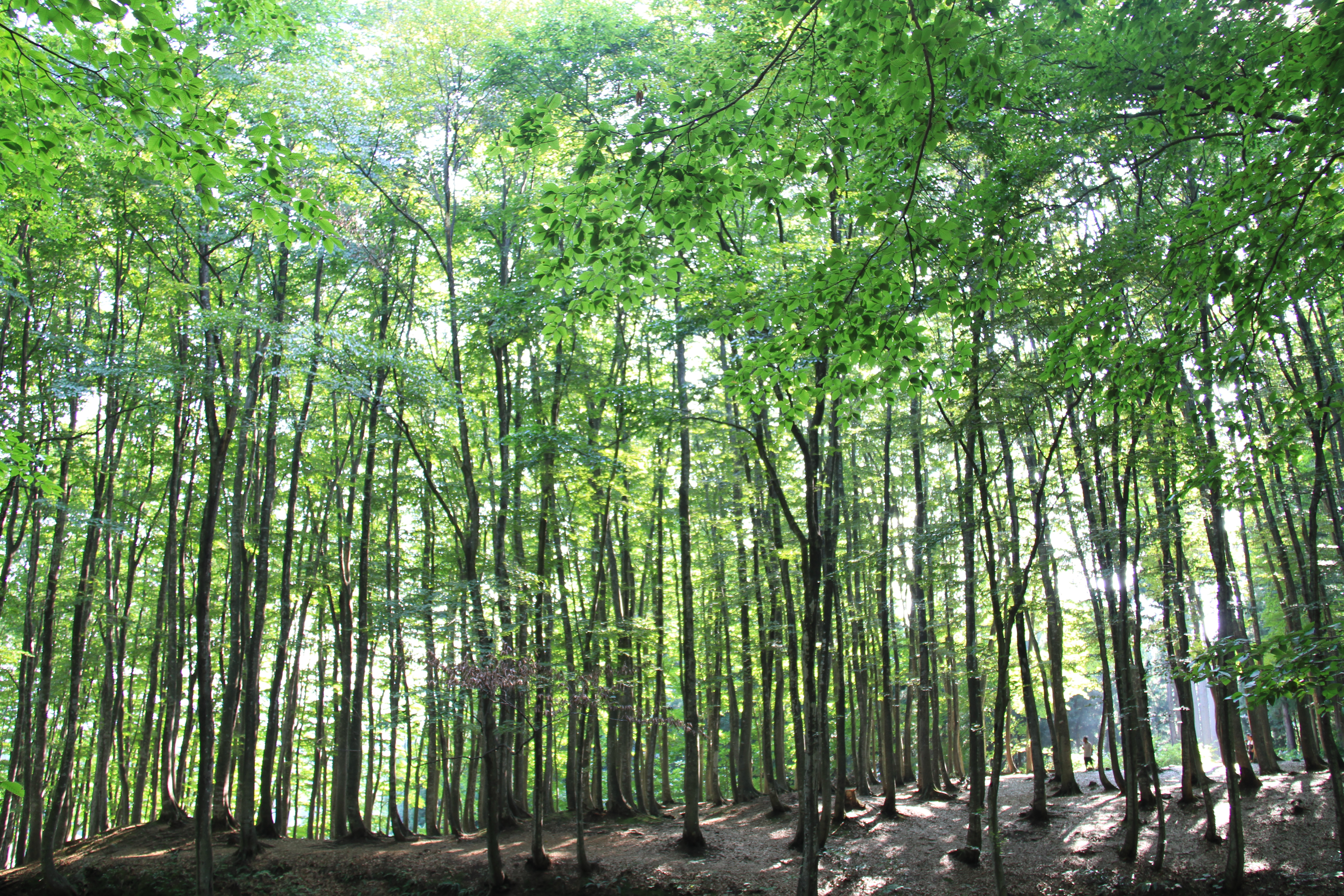
Bijinbayashi

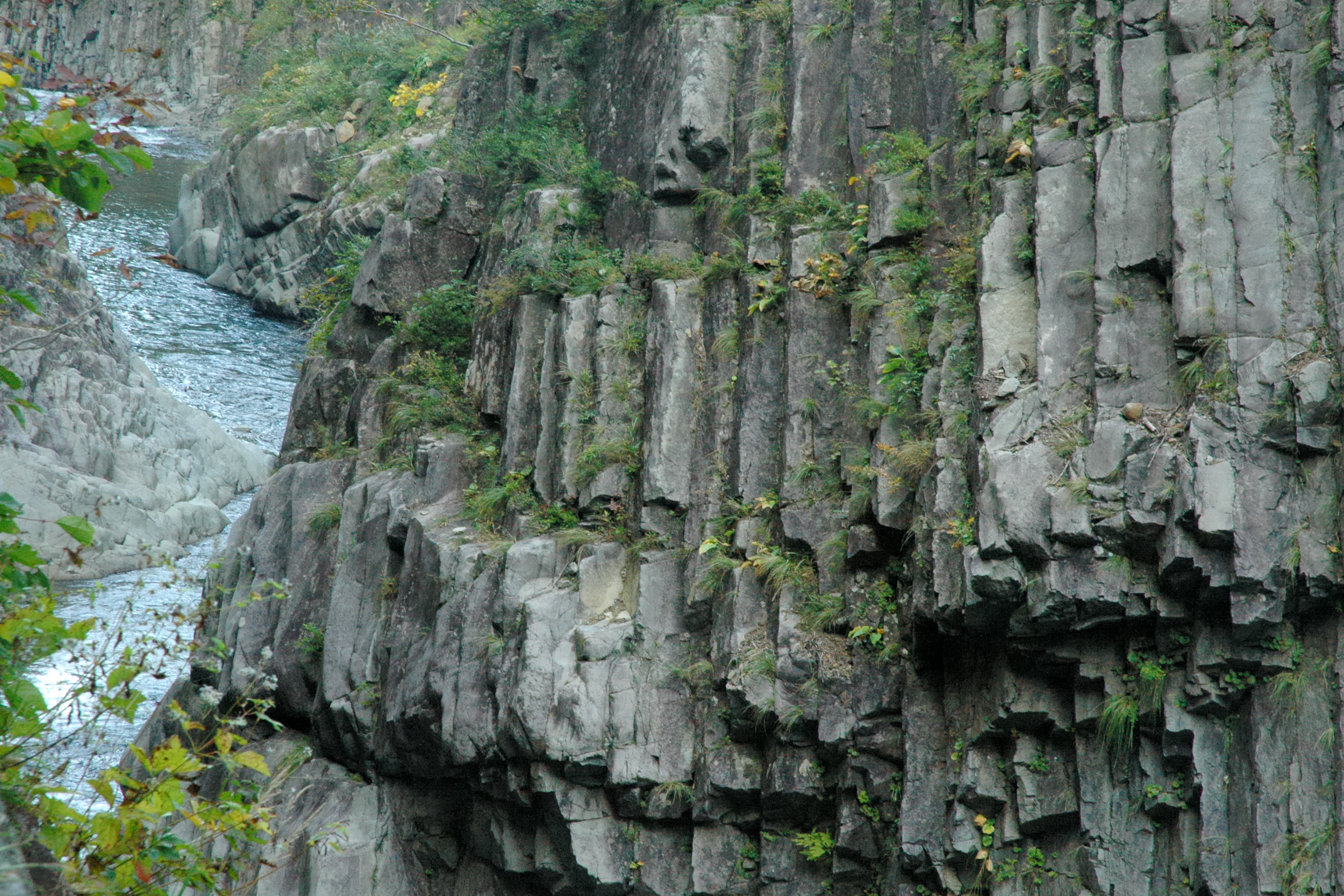
Kiyotsu Gorge

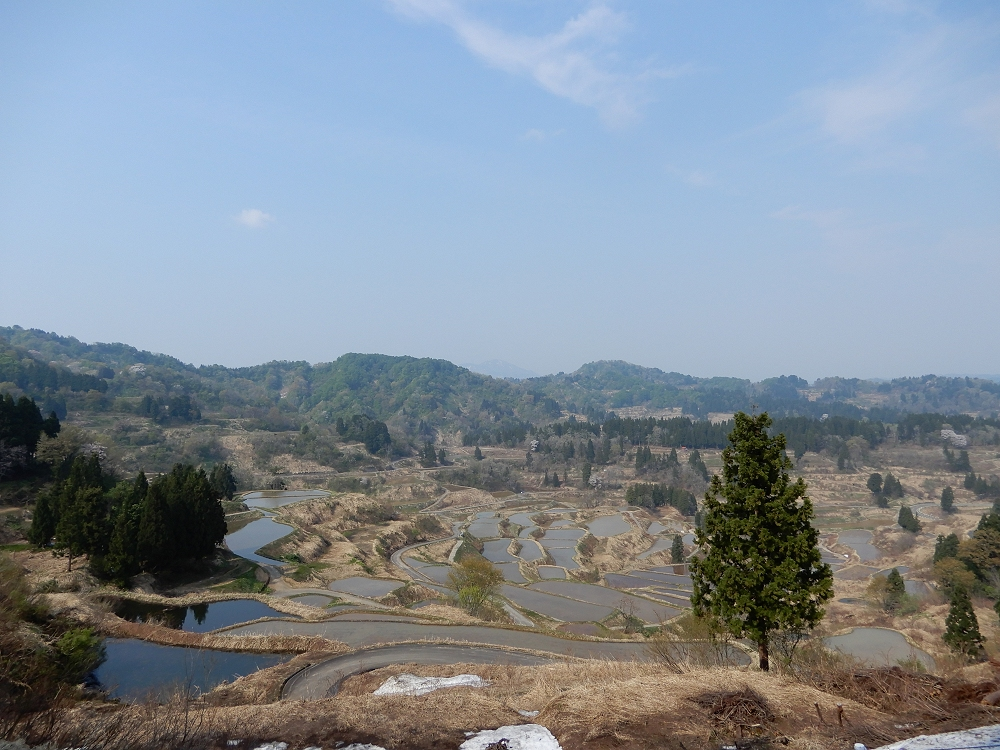
Hoshitoge Rice Terrace

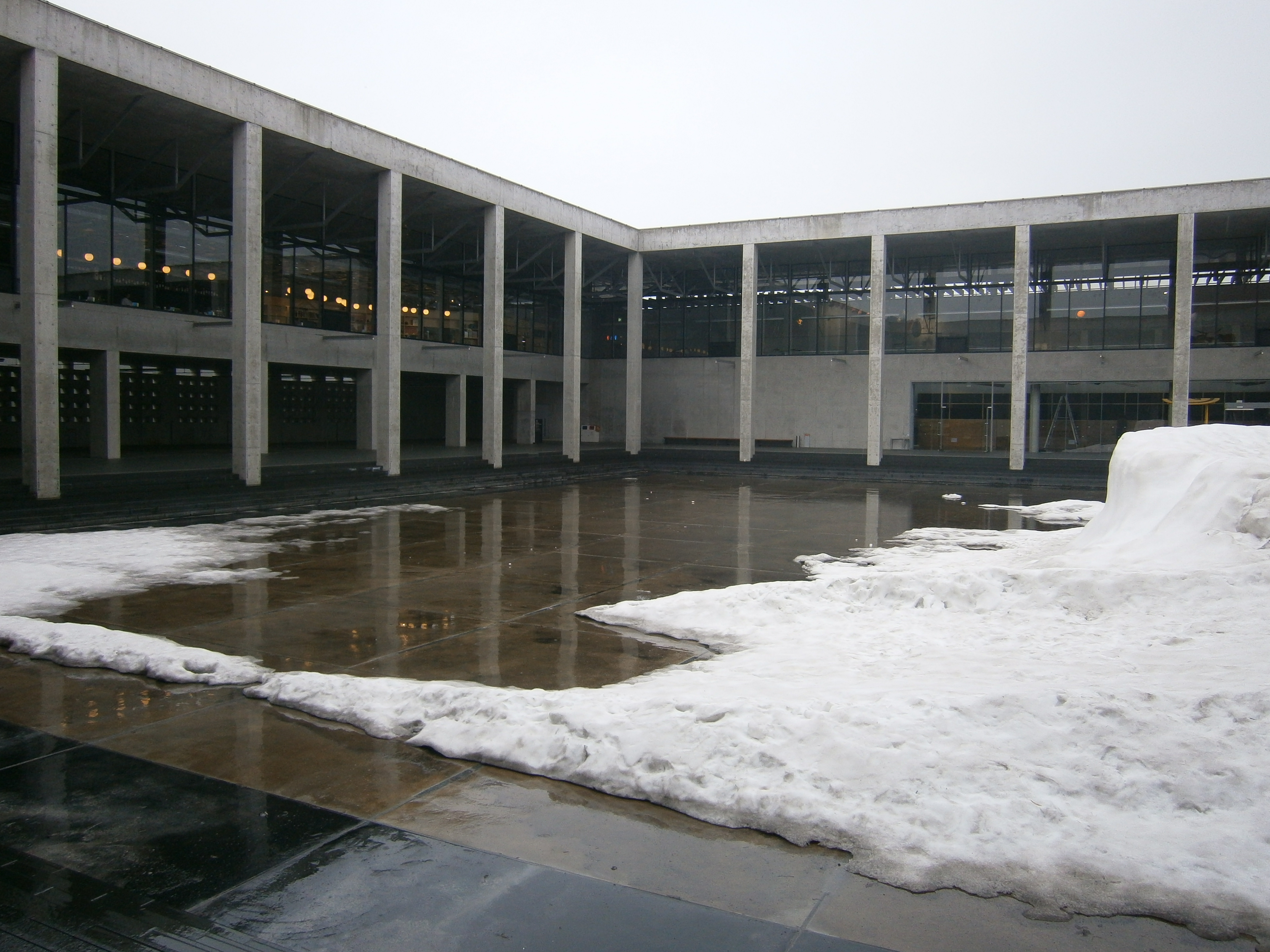
Kinare, an Echigo-Tsumari Art Triennial site, late March

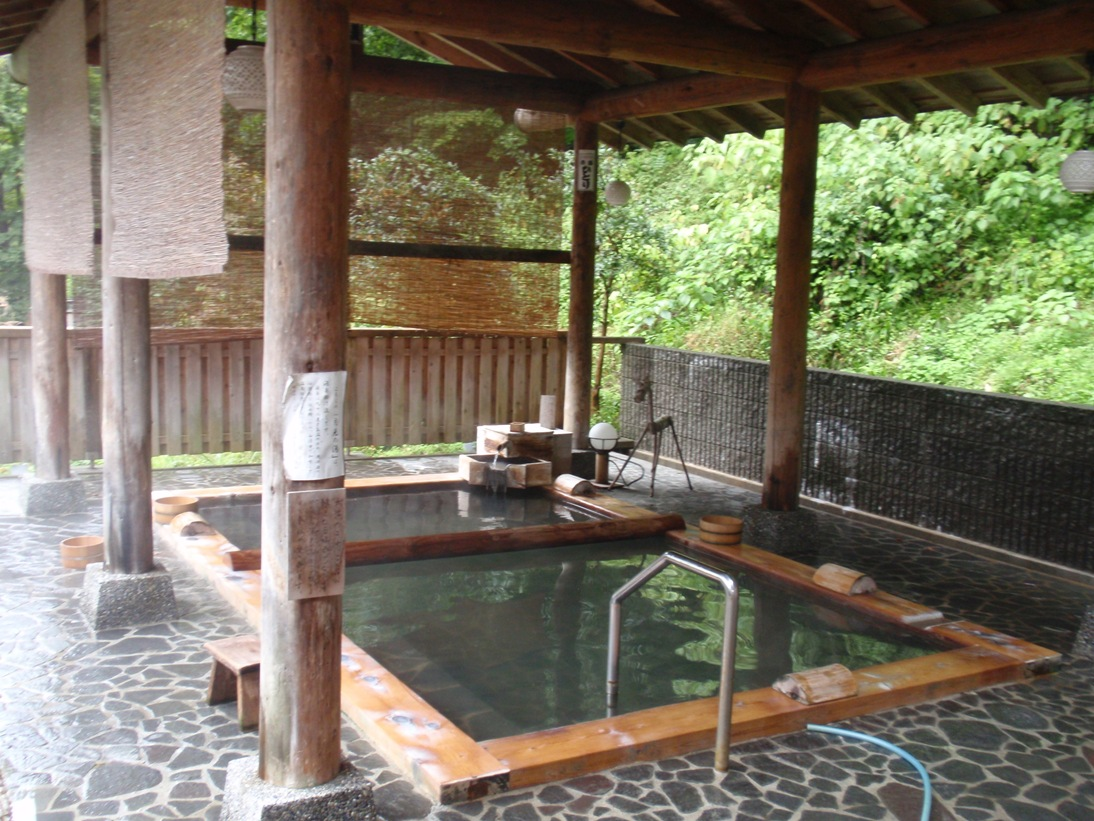
Matsunoyama Onsen
