= List of places of scenic beauty of Japan (Niigata) =

This list is of the places of scenic beauty of Japan located within the Prefecture of Niigata.

== National Places of Scenic Beauty ==
As of 1 December 2020, twelve Places have been designated at a national level.

Site	Municipality	Comments	Image	Coordinates	Type	Ref.
Former Saitō Family Detached Residence Gardens 旧齋藤氏別邸庭園; Kyū-Saitō-shi bettei teien	Niigata			37°54′58″N 139°02′11″E	1	
Former Shibata Domain Lower Residence Gardens (Shimizu-en) 旧新発田藩下屋敷（清水谷御殿）庭園および五十公野御茶屋庭園; Kyū-Shibata-han shimo-yashiki (Shimizudani goten) teien oyobi gojū kōno ochaya teien	Shibata			37°56′36″N 139°19′41″E	1	
Sado Kaifu Coast 佐渡海府海岸; Sado Kaifu kaigan	Sado			38°07′29″N 138°15′58″E	8	
Sado Ogi Coast 佐渡小木海岸; Sado Ogi kaigan	Sado	also a Natural Monument		37°48′11″N 138°14′19″E	8	
Sasagawa Flow 笹川流; Sasagawa nagare	Murakami	also a Natural Monument		38°23′36″N 139°27′11″E	5, 8	
Kiyotsu Gorge 清津峡; Kiyotsu-kyō	Yuzawa, Tōkamachi	also a Natural Monument		36°57′14″N 138°45′19″E	6	
Teikan-en 貞観園; Teikan-en	Kashiwazaki			37°13′38″N 138°38′16″E	1	
Tashiro Nanatsugama 田代の七ツ釜; Tashiro no Nanatsugama	Tsunan, Tōkamachi	also a Natural Monument		36°58′11″N 138°42′32″E	5, 6	
Watanabe Family Gardens 渡辺氏庭園; Watanabe-shi teien	Sekikawa			38°05′26″N 139°33′54″E	1	
Former Sekiyama Hōzō-in Gardens 旧関山宝蔵院庭園; Kyū-Sekiyama Hōzō-in teien	Myōkō			36°56′01″N 138°12′49″E	1	
Hakusan Park 白山公園; Hakusan kōen	Niigata			37°01′34″N 138°15′15″E	1	
Landscape of Oku no Hosomichi - Oyashirazu おくのほそ道の風景地 親しらす; Oku no Hosomichi no fūkei-chi Oyashirazu	Itoigawa	designation spans ten prefectures		36°59′35″N 137°41′43″E		

== Prefectural Places of Scenic Beauty ==
As of 1 May 2020, three Places have been designated at a prefectural level.

Site	Municipality	Comments	Image	Coordinates	Type	Ref.
Oyashirazu Koshirazu 親不知子不知; Oyashirazu Koshirazu	Itoigawa			36°59′35″N 137°41′43″E		
Jōsen-ji Gardens 浄専寺庭園; Jōsenji teien	Niigata			37°43′19″N 138°50′13″E		
Daigahana 台ケ鼻; Daigahana	Sado	also a Prefectural Natural Monument		37°57′54″N 138°15′17″E		

== Municipal Places of Scenic Beauty ==
As of 1 May 2020, sixteen Places have been designated at a municipal level.

== Registered Places of Scenic Beauty ==
As of 1 December 2020, one Monument has been registered (as opposed to designated) as a Place of Scenic Beauty at a national level.

Place	Municipality	Comments	Image	Coordinates	Type	Ref.
Ishizaki Family Gardens (Sekisensō Gardens) 旧石崎氏庭園（石泉荘庭園） Ishizaki-shi (Sekisensō) teien	Shibata			37°56′28″N 139°19′42″E		

== See also ==
- Cultural Properties of Japan
- List of parks and gardens of Niigata Prefecture
- List of Historic Sites of Japan (Niigata)
