= Uonuma-Kyūryō Station =

Railway station in Minamiuonuma, Niigata Prefecture, Japan

Uonuma-Kyūryō Station 魚沼丘陵駅
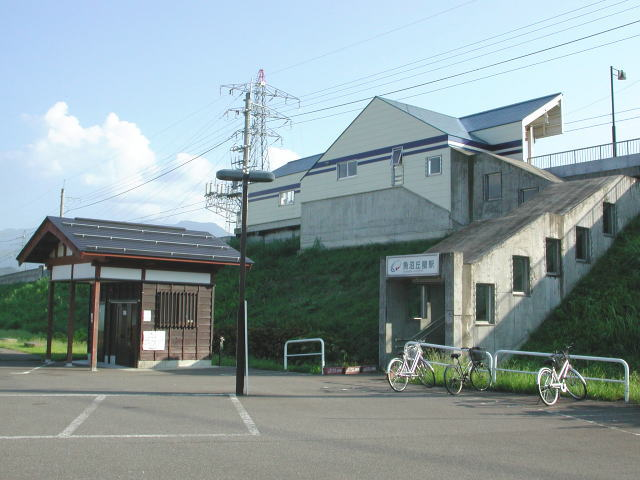
- Uonuma-Kyūryō Station in September 2004

General information
- Location: 232-2 Noda, Minamiuonuma-shi, Niigata-ken 949-7144; Japan
- Coordinates: 37.0964°N 138.8777°E
- Operator: Hokuetsu Express
- Line: ■Hokuhoku Line
- Distance: 3.6 km from Muikamachi
- Platforms: 1 side platform
- Tracks: 1

Other information
- Status: Unstaffed
- Website: Official website

History
- Opened: 22 March 1997; 29 years ago
Location
- Location within Hokuhoku Line Location within Japan

Uonuma-Kyūryō Station (魚沼丘陵駅, Uonuma-Kyūryō-eki) is a railway station located in the city of Minamiuonuma, Niigata, Japan, operated by the third sector Hokuetsu Express.

== Lines ==
Uonuma-Kyūryō Station is a station on the Hokuhoku Line, and is located 3.6 kilometers from the starting point of the line at Muikamachi.

== Station layout ==
The station has a single elevated side platform serving a bi-directional track. The platform is short, and can handle trains of only two carriages in length. The station is unattended.

=== Platforms ===
■ Hokuhoku Line	for Echigo-Yuzawa, Muikamachi, Tōkamachi, Saigata and Naoetsu (bidirectional)

== Adjacent stations ==
«	Service	»
Hokuhoku Line
Muikamachi	Local	Misashima

== History ==
Uonuma-Kyūryō Station opened on 22 March 1997, coinciding with the opening of the Hokuhoku Line.

== Surrounding area ==
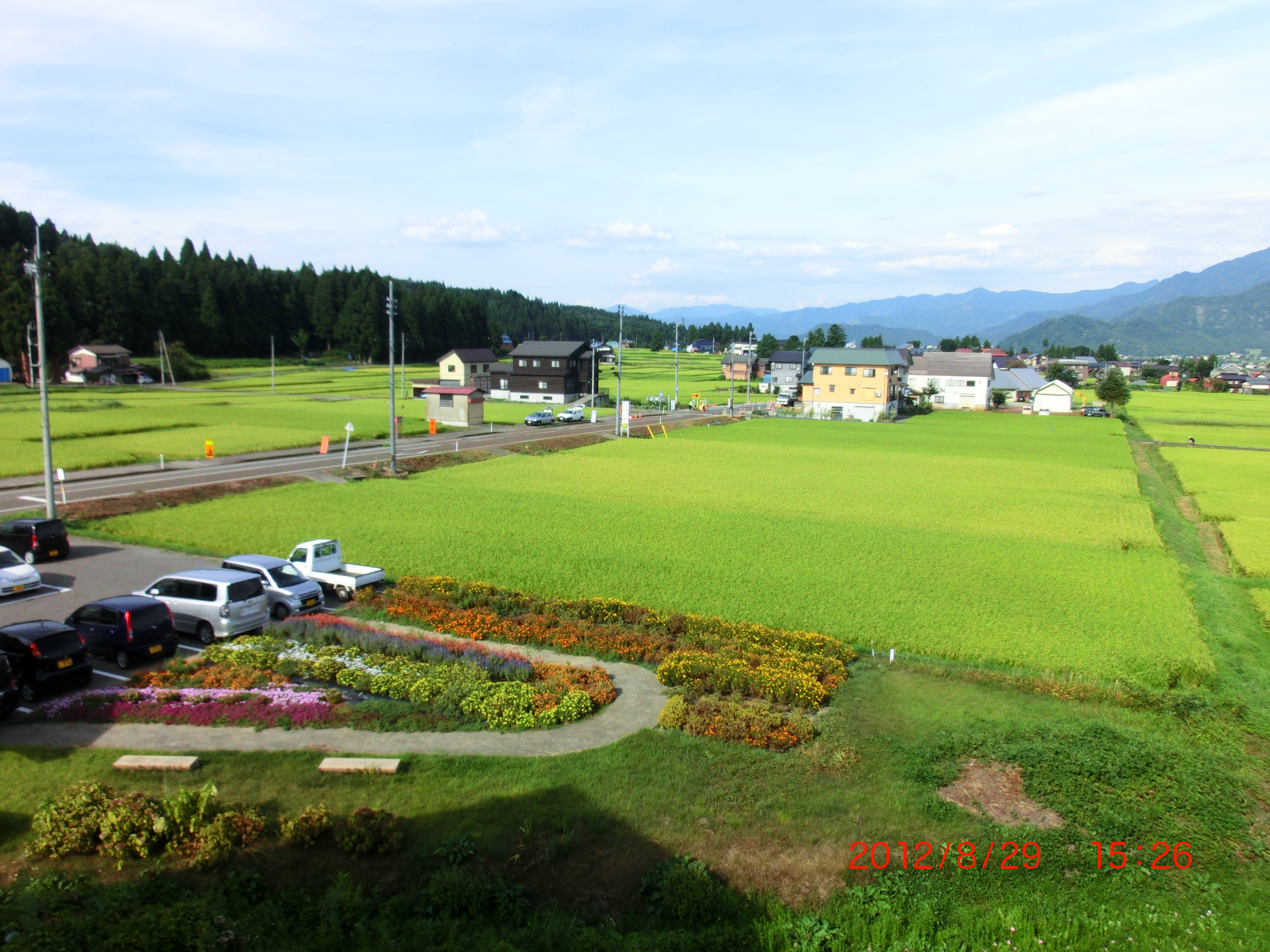
View from the platform

- Akakura Tunnel

== See also ==
- List of railway stations in Japan
