= Misashima Station =

Railway station in Tōkamachi, Niigata Prefecture, Japan

Misashima Station 美佐島駅
- Misashima Station in July 2021

General information
- Location: 135 Uma, Tōkamachi-shi, Niigata-ken 948-0000; Japan
- Coordinates: 37.1311°N 138.7898°E
- Operator: Hokuetsu Express
- Line: ■Hokuhoku Line
- Distance: 12.2 km from Muikamachi
- Platforms: 1 side platform
- Tracks: 1

Other information
- Status: Unstaffed
- Website: Official website

History
- Opened: 22 March 1997; 29 years ago

Passengers
- FY2005: 11 daily
Location
- Location within Hokuhoku Line Location within Japan

Misashima Station (美佐島駅, Misashima-eki) is a railway station located in the city of Tōkamachi, Niigata, Japan, operated by the third sector Hokuetsu Express.

== Lines ==
Misashima Station is a station on the Hokuhoku Line, and is located 12.2 kilometers from the starting point of the line at Muikamachi.

== Station layout ==
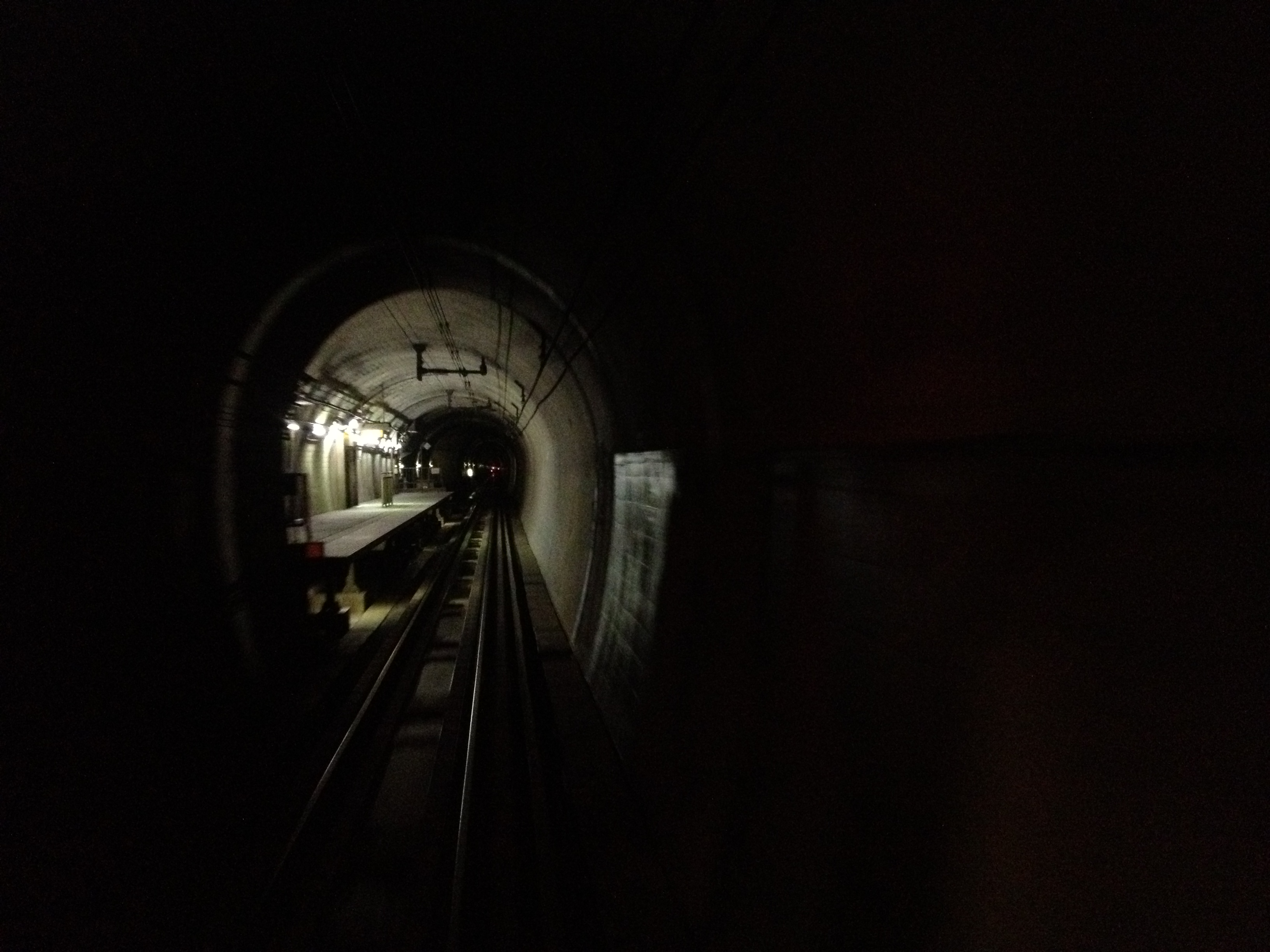
Misashima Station platform

This station is noteworthy because the station building is on ground level and the single side platform is located 10.1 m (33 ft) below, inside a tunnel. The platform level is closed unless a local train is scheduled to arrive because of the strong winds generated by high pressure difference between the tunnel and the ground level. Passengers alighting at this station cannot loiter. They must leave the platform level within 2 minutes or PA system with monitoring camera will ask the passengers to leave immediately. There are two automatic doors, one on the ground level and another at the platform level. The automatic door on the ground level is locked, preventing access to the platform level, until the train driver remotely unlocks the door. The two automatic doors never open at the same time, again, to avoid creating strong winds caused by pressure gradient. There is an underground waiting room between the two doors with wooden bench, timetable, and a suggestion box. Above ground, the waiting room features tatami and is air-conditioned.

=== Platforms ===
■ Hokuhoku Line	for Echigo-Yuzawa, Muikamachi, Tōkamachi, Saigata and Naoetsu (bidirectional)

== Adjacent stations ==
«	Service	»
Hokuhoku Line
Uonuma-Kyūryō	Local	Shinza

== History ==
The station opened on 22 March 1997, coinciding with the opening of the Hokuhoku Line.

== See also ==
- List of railway stations in Japan
