= Echigo-Mizusawa Station =

Railway station in Tōkamachi, Niigata Prefecture, Japan

Echigo-Mizusawa Station 越後水沢駅
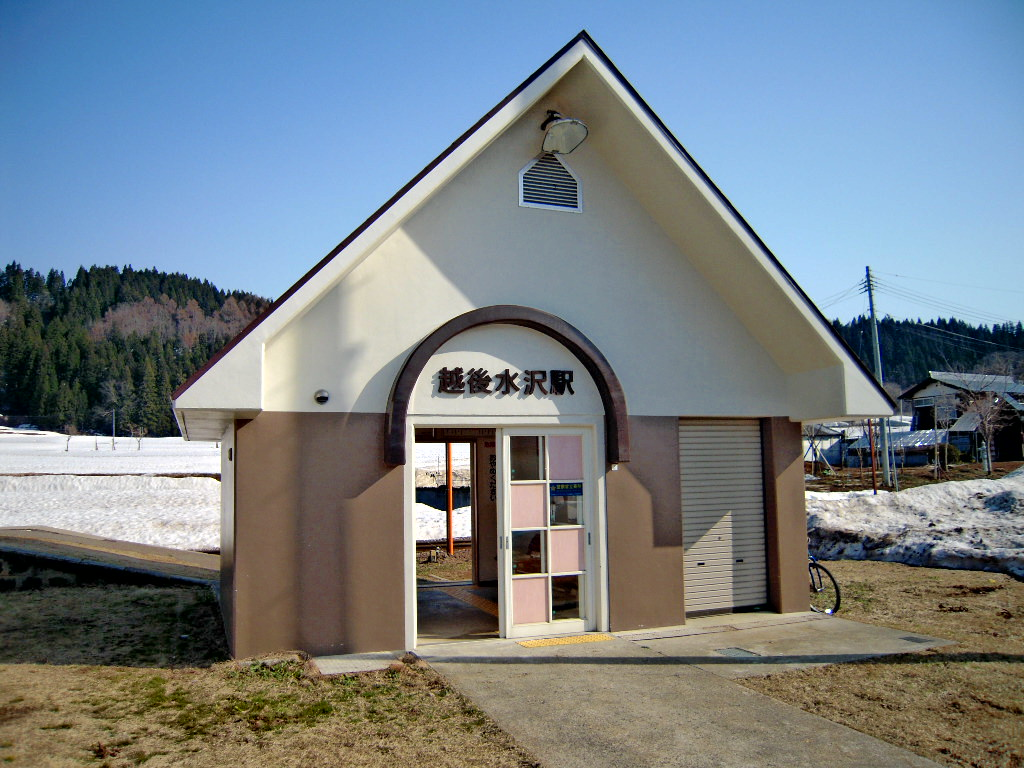
- Echigo-Mizusawa Station in April 2010

General information
- Location: Baba, Tōkamachi-shi, Niigata-ken 949-8551; Japan
- Coordinates: 37.0744°N 138.7182°E
- Operator: JR East
- Line: ■ Iiyama Line
- Distance: 67.5 kilometres (41.9 mi) from Toyono
- Platforms: 1 side platform

Other information
- Status: unstaffed
- Website: www.jreast.co.jp/estation/station/info.aspx?StationCd=284

History
- Opened: 1 September 1929

Services
Preceding station	JR East	Following station
Echigo-Tazawa towards Nagano	Iiyama Line	Doichi towards Echigo-Kawaguchi
Location
- Location within Japan

Echigo-Mizusawa Station (越後水沢駅, Echigo-Mizusawa-eki) is a railway station in the city of Tōkamachi, Niigata, Japan operated by East Japan Railway Company (JR East).

== Lines ==
Echigo-Mizusawa Station is served by the Iiyama Line, and is 67.5 kilometres (41.9 mi) from the starting point of the line at Toyono Station.

== Station layout ==
The station consists of a single side platform serving one bi-directional track. The station is unattended.

== History ==
Echigo-Mizusawa Station opened on 1 September 1929. With the privatization of Japanese National Railways (JNR) on 1 April 1987, the station came under the control of JR East. A new station building was completed in 1998.

== Surrounding area ==
- National Route 117

== See also ==
- List of railway stations in Japan
