= Echigo-Tsumari Art Triennial =

Art festival in Japan

Coordinates: 37.0167°N 138.6000°E

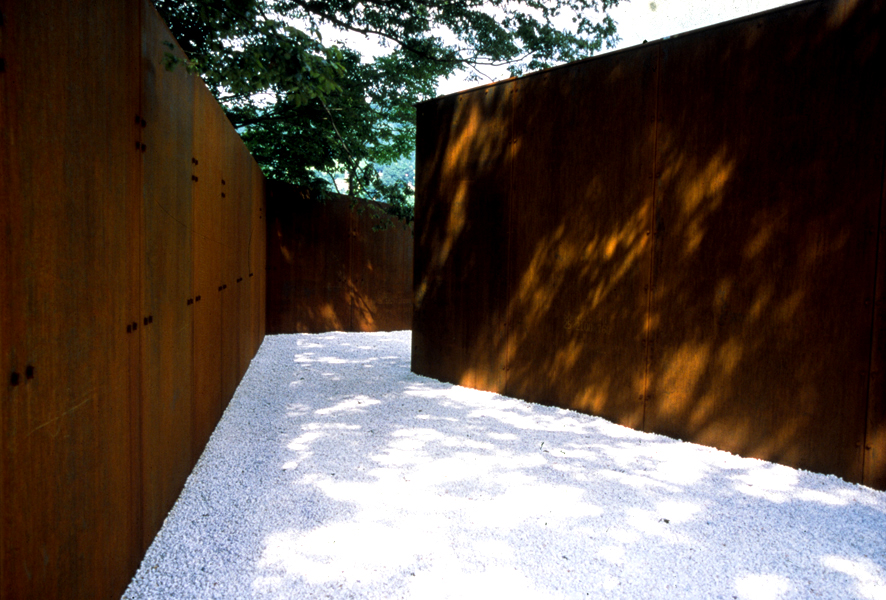
Casagrande & Rintala's Potemkin, Echigo-Tsumari, Japan 2003"

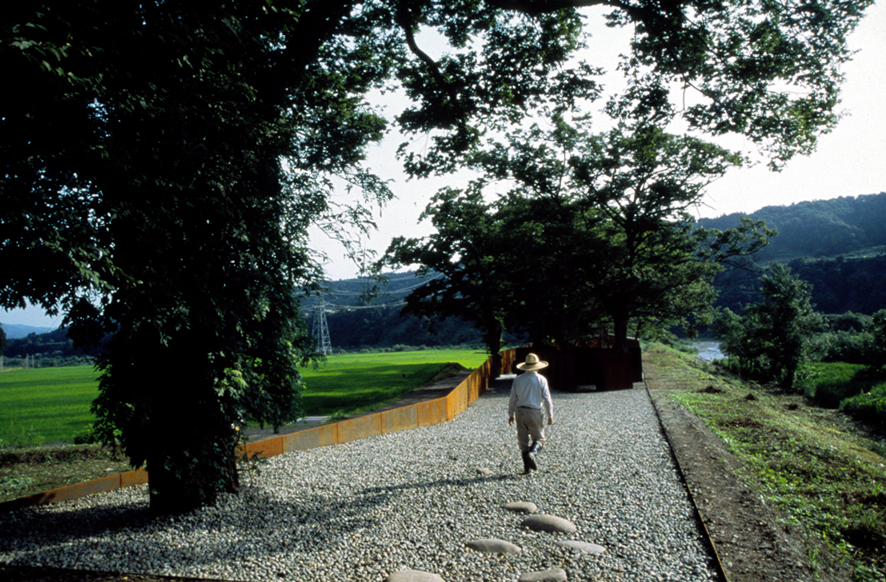
Casagrande & Rintala's steel park Potemkin (2003) in Kuramata village, Echigo-Tsumari.

The Echigo-Tsumari Art Triennial (ETAT) is an international contemporary art festival held once every three years in Niigata Prefecture, Japan. The festival was created by the Tokyo commercial gallery Art Front Gallery (AFG) and is directed by gallery director Fram Kitagawa. It was first held in 2000, and has since become one of Japan's largest art festivals, recurring every three years with the exception of 2021 when it was postponed to 2022 due to the COVID-19 pandemic. It takes place across six regions of the prefecture, an area known for its heavy snowfall. These six regions—which include Tokamachi, Kawanishi, Nakasato, Matsushiro, Matsunoyama, and Tsunan—together comprise the Echigo-Tsumari Art Field. Since its inception, ETAT has been designed around the close-knit relationship between humankind and nature, and its art installations are chosen and curated to effectively contribute to this narrative.

== History ==
A plan to revitalize the rural regions of Niigata via art, titled the Art Necklace Plan, was first developed by the Niigata prefectural government in 1994, and Tokyo Art Front Gallery's Fram Kitagawa was chosen to direct the project. Kitagawa had previously spearheaded several international art exhibitions and projects. The Echigo-Tsumari Art Triennale was conceived as a means of highlighting the local region and enabling participation by local communities, while simultaneously being an event with an international scope that would attract visitors and artists from all over the world. The 1st ETAT took place from 20 July to 10 September 2000, and featured 153 works by 138 artist groups and individual artists, with an estimated 162,000 visitors. Since then, the Triennale has expanded considerably in scope and visitorship; the 7th ETAT took place in 2018, featuring 379 artworks by 363 artist groups and individual artists from 44 countries and regions. It experienced 548,380, a more than threefold increase from the attendance numbers at the inaugural festival. In addition, over a hundred villages participated in the 2018 festival, where the 2000 festival had 28 participating villages.

The 8th and most recent Triennale took place from April to November 2022 after a one-year postponement due to the COVID-19 pandemic. This iteration of festival was its largest yet, lasting over six months when previous festivals had only been approximately two months in duration.

== Themes and Mission ==
The choice of location of the Echigo Tsumari Art Field is heavily predicated on the Japanese concept of satoyama (Japanese: 里山), which refers to the space joining mountains with arable land. This landscape serves a framework for the focus on the deeply intertwined relationship between humankind and nature, and an emphasis on humankind's continued reliance and connection to the natural landscape even in a contemporary industrial society. Through art installations scattered across the region, ETAT seeks to revitalise rural communities through a combination of tourist revenue, raising of awareness of the state of depopulation in rural communities, and the active involvement of local communities in the development and facilitation of the Triennale.

To achieve these aims under the umbrella theme of the human-nature connection, the ETAT website outlines several specific subthemes that it seeks to highlight in its exhibitions and events, including community cooperation, drawing from local food, crafts, and other products from for inspiration, and desire to create a strong connection between the local and the global.

One of the most famous works in the Art Field is the Tunnel of Light (Kiyotsu Gorge Tunnel), designed by MAD Architects for the 2018 Triennale. For this project, the architects converted a 750-meter tunnel into an installation passable by visitors to the Art Field. The tunnel was redesigned around the theme of five elements of nature (fire, wood, earth, metal, and water), seeking to highlight these elements while simultaneously allowing visitors to view the rocky landscape in new aesthetic and sensory ways via the tunnel. At various points, depending on where they are in the tunnel, pedestrians can view the landscape through the mouths of the tunnel, portals in the wall or ceiling, observatory-like balcony spaces, reflective pools, or reflections off the metal surfaces of the tunnel. The lighting used also varies to affect the viewer's experience throughout their journey, and the aesthetic of the tunnel also changes naturally throughout the seasons to create a complex and everchanging, yet simultaneously constant visual experience that mirrors that of the natural world.

The use of 'framing' the landscape via various means—whether through physical framing via portals, reflection, or lighting—is a recurring theme in the works that appear throughout the Echigo-Tsumari Art Field, such as the iconic "For Lots of Lost Windows," by Akiko Utsumi and "The Rice Fields," by Ilya and Emilia Kabakov.

== Impact ==
One of the most quantitative results of the festival has been the influx of tourism to the region since the advent of ETAT, prompting studies on the positive economic impact of exhibition-driven tourism to rural areas. However, the very nature of Echigo Tsumari as an experiential site founded in nascent human-nature relationships also creates a tension, and at times contrast, with this strictly economic model of success.

This has resulted in arguments that, where previously discourse on art as a means of rural revitalization has been limited to its role as an economic or practical catalyst, ETAT instead represents a refreshing departure from this narrative, intervening in the "everyday life of farmers in the festival area" and becoming "a catalyst for social, cultural and natural change." Scholarship has framed ETAT as an environmentally-conscious counterpoint to the consumer culture that has gripped Japan and the world at large, remarking on the uniquely rural positioning of the Triennale. Scholar Brad Monsma writes that the location yields a thematic departure from the “festivals in Japan and elsewhere that are urban and centralized, linking art with international commercial development.” In contrast, he writes, “Echigo-Tsumari is rural, scattered throughout 750 square kilometres, and insistent upon the local and what cannot be commodified.”

In addition to its departure from traditional conceptions of consumer culture, ETAT has garnered praise for its drift away the potentially homogenizing, urban-centric effects of globalism on the art scene. For example, in the early days of the Triennale, art historian Reiko Tomii highlighted the innovative use of site-specific installations to invite the local community to collaborate with international artists such as Cai Guo-Qiang. Similarly, Susanne Klien writes that Echigo-Tsumari “constitutes a new type of revitalization with its emphasis on human exchange and interaction of heterogeneous players in a rural setting.”

At the same time, there are potential pitfalls to the model that ETAT uses to promote the local region. Klien explores both sides of this coin, citing the side effects of the “collaboration” that occurs between artists and the community during the Triennale. She contends that, despite the organizers’ efforts to create a sense of camaraderie between artists and the local and international community, these practices simultaneously have the potential to infringe upon the lifestyles and smooth operation of these rural communities, and ultimately may achieve the nostalgic romanticization of rural life expected by urban audiences rather than true glocal cooperation. More specifically, Thekla Boven has researched the repurposing of 11 defunct elementary schools in the Tokamachi region as art installation/exhibition spaces, positing that, despite the positive intentions of these interventions, in some cases the constant repurposing of abandoned buildings for use by the festival may not be the most effective use of these edifices in their local context; that is to say, what would be most useful for the local community on both an economic, social, and holistic level.

While the Echigo-Tsumari Art Triennale is a temporary annual event, it does retain an element of permanence through the Echigo-Tsumari Art Field (ETAF), which opens to the public every spring, making it a year-round local fixture and tourist destination. The Art Field comprises a network of contemporary art museums and open air installations that seek to propel the Art Field’s mission of, in light of global environmental concerns, structuring new ways of thinking and engaging with the natural landscape through the vehicle of art. In addition, ETAF collaborates with local town and village tourism offices to create tours and recommended itineraries in the region that encourage visitors to see works from past triennales, visit local galleries, and sample regional cuisine.

=== Selected List of Awards ===
- Furusato Event Award (by the Ministry of Internal Affairs)（2001）
- Tokyo Creation Award（Creation of Art Scene Award）（2002）
- Machi-tsukuri Commendation by the General Affairs Minister（2007）
- The 2nd JTB Culture Exchange Award - Excellence Prize（2007）
- The 7th All Right ! Japan Award Grand Prix （Prime Minister’s Award) （2009）
- New Tourism Development Category Award and Judges Special Award（Japan Association of Travel Agents）（2009）
- Community Building Award: Minister of Land, Infrastructure, Transport and Tourism（2010）
- The 10th Eco Tourism Award Special Award（Ministry of the Environment / Japan Eco Tourism Organization）（2015）
- NIKS Rural Revitalisation Award (2018）
- GOOD DESIGN GOLD AWARD（Minister of Economy, Trade and Industry Award）（2018）

== Selected List of Affiliated Artists/Groups ==
- Atelier Bow-Wow + Tokyo Institute of Technology Tsukamoto Lab
- Stephen Antonakos
- Kiyoshi Awazu
- Christian Boltanski
- Casagrande & Rintala
- Jimmie Durham
- Ondekoza
- Thomas Eller
- Ann Hamilton
- Ilya and Emilia Kabakov
- Tatsuo Kawaguchi
- Tadashi Kawamata
- Tadashi Maeyama
- Daido Moriyama
- Fujiko Nakaya
- Min Tanaka
- Ma Yansong/MAD Architects
- Jean-Luc Vilmouth

== See also ==
- Aichi Triennale
- Hakone Open-Air Museum
- Naoshima (Art Island)
- Setouchi Triennale
- Tokyo Biennale
- Utsukushigahara Open-Air Museum
- Yokohama Triennale
- Kitagawa, Furamu. Art Place Japan : The Echigo-Tsumari Art Triennale and the Vision to Reconnect Art and Nature. English ed. New York, 2015.
