= Toshiei Mizuochi =

Japanese politician

- 水落 敏栄
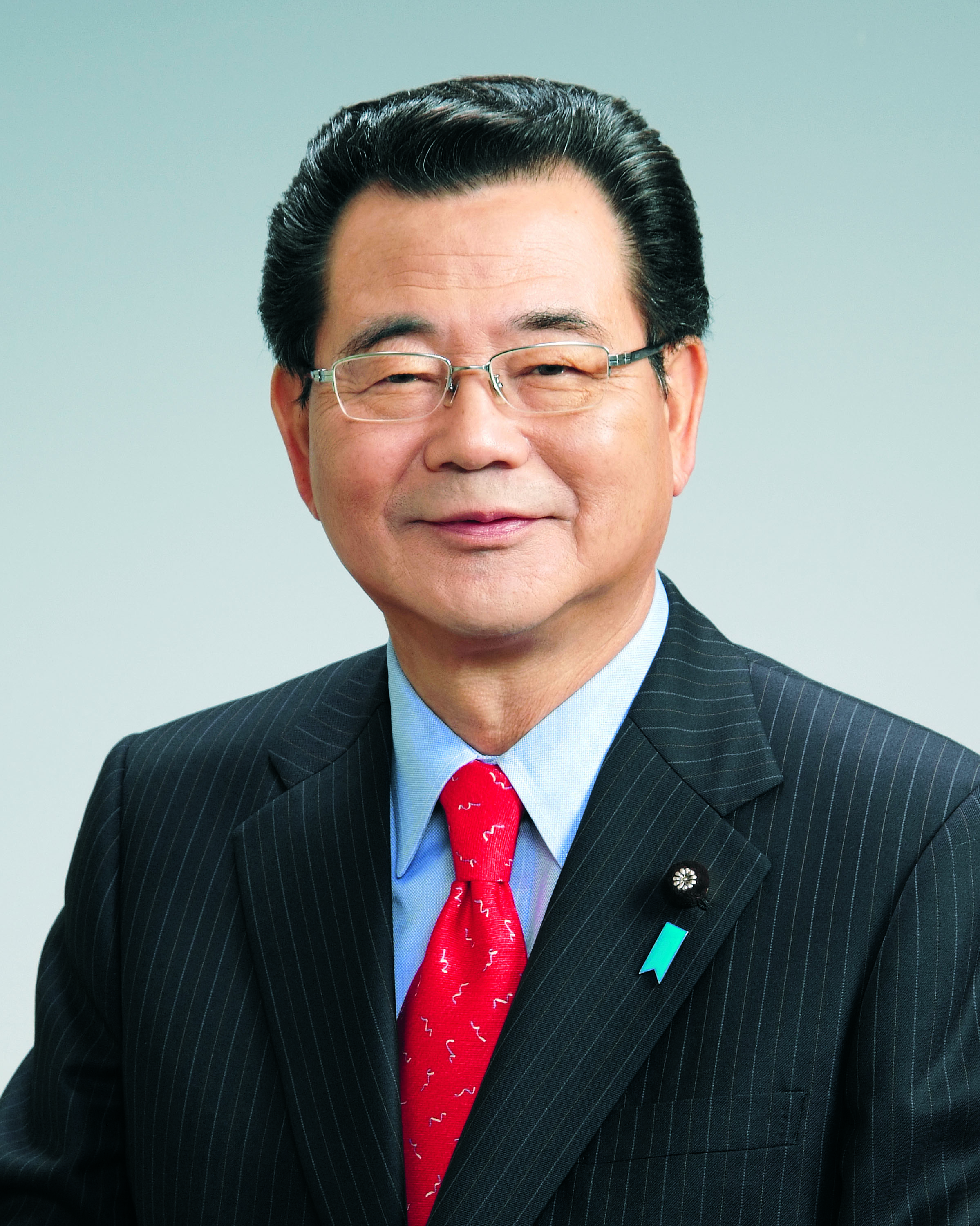
- Official portrait, 2009

Member of the House of Councillors
- In office 26 July 2004 – 25 July 2022
- Constituency: National PR

Personal details
- Born: 24 February 1943 (age 83) Tōkamachi, Niigata, Japan
- Party: Liberal Democratic
- Education: Niigata Commercial High School

Toshiei Mizuochi (水落 敏栄, Mizuochi Toshiei; born February 24, 1943) is a Japanese politician of the Liberal Democratic Party, a member of the House of Councillors in the Diet (national legislature). A native of Tokamachi, Niigata and high school graduate, he was elected for the first time in 2004. Mizuochi, whose father was killed in action during the Pacific War, serves as the president of the Japan War-Bereaved Families Association since 2015.
