= Kawanishi, Niigata =

Kawanishi 川西町
- Former municipality
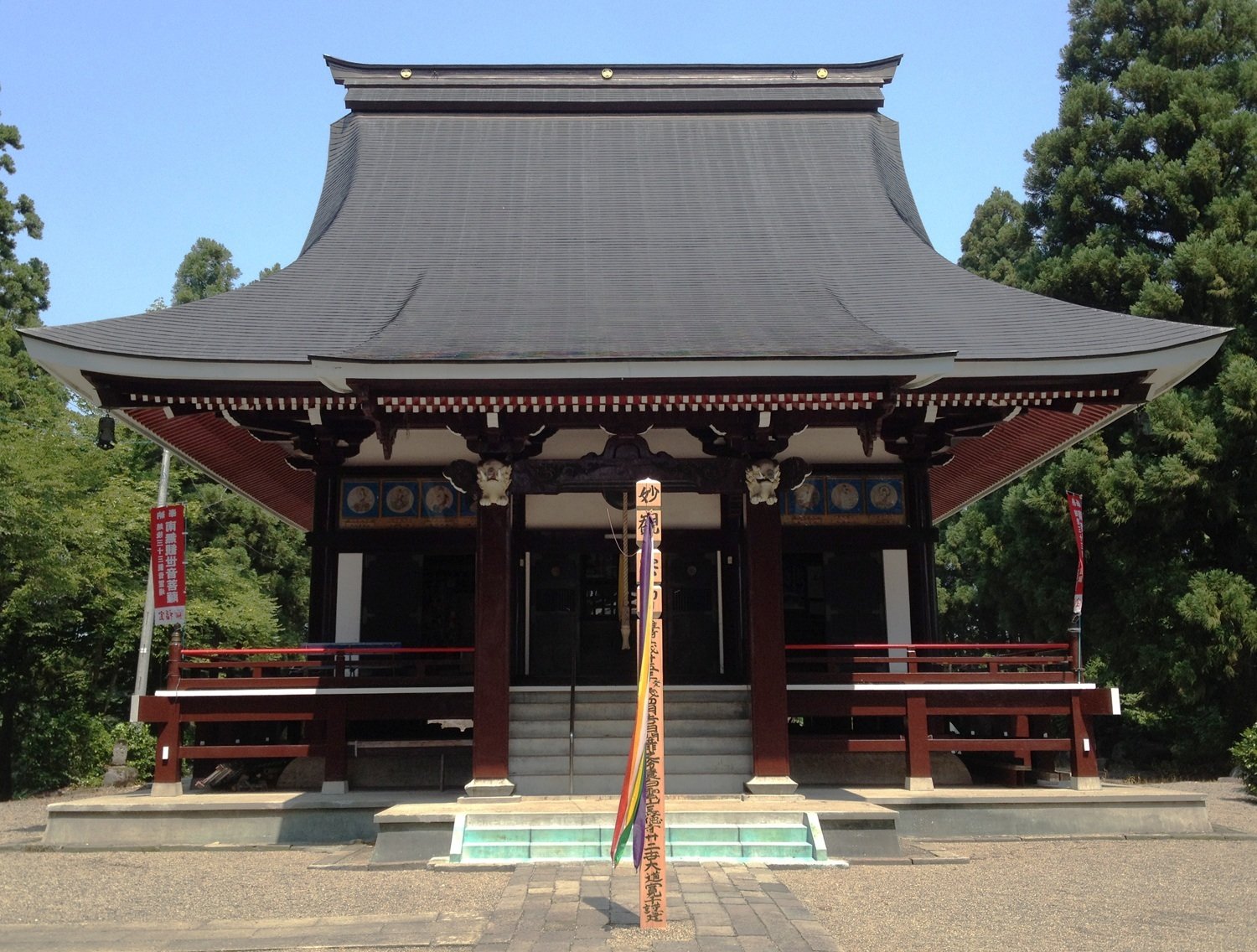
- Senju Kannon

- Flag Emblem
- Interactive map of Kawanishi
- Country: Japan
- Region: Hokuriku
- Prefecture: Niigata Prefecture
- District: Nakauonuma District
- Merged: April 1, 2005 (now part of Tōkamachi)

Area
  - Total: 73.55 km^{2} (28.40 sq mi)

Population (2003)
  - Total: 7,829
- Time zone: UTC+09:00 (JST)

5 former municipalities merged to create the new Tōkamachi City (yellow area)

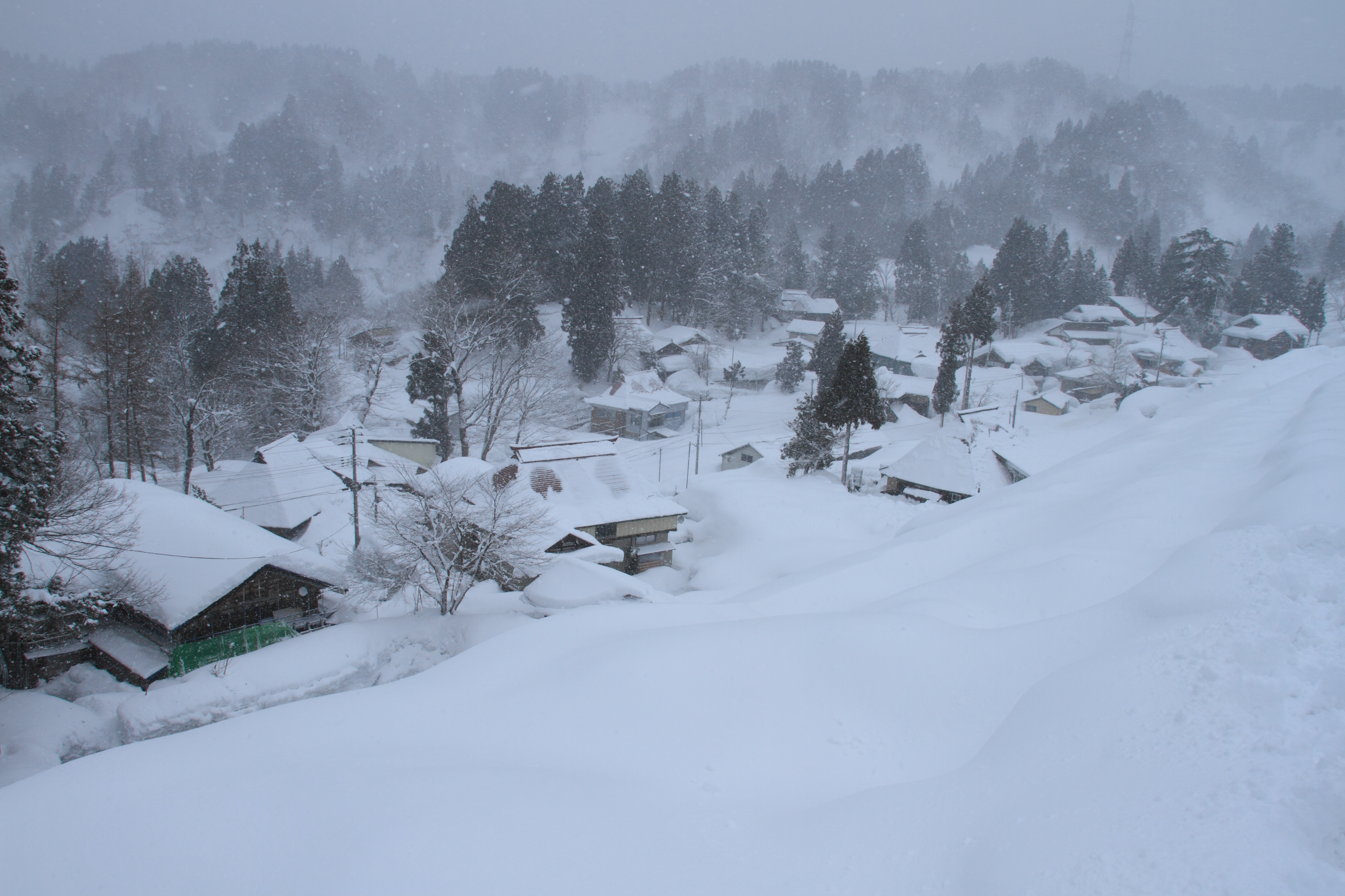
Koshirakura

Kawanishi (川西町, Kawanishi-machi) was a town located in Nakauonuma District, Niigata Prefecture, Japan.

As of 2003, the town had an estimated population of 7,829 and a density of 106.44 persons per km^{2}. The total area was 73.55 km^{2}.

On April 1, 2005, Kawanishi, along with the towns of Matsudai and Matsunoyama (both from Higashikubiki District), and the village of Nakasato (also from Nakauonuma District), was merged into the expanded city of Tōkamachi.

== Transportation ==
=== Highway ===
- National Route 252
- National Route 403
