= Kiyotsu Gorge =

- IUCN category III (natural monument or feature)
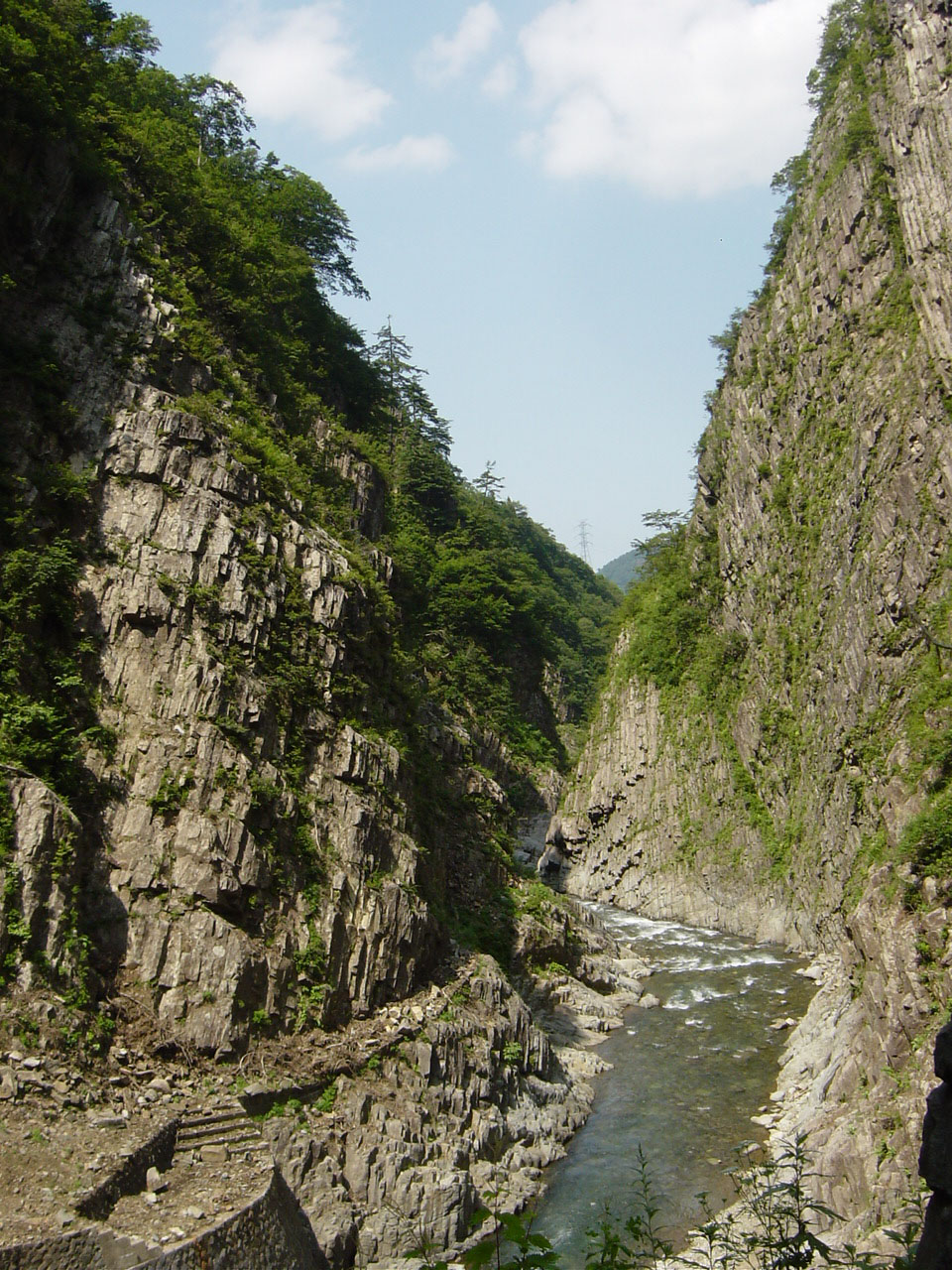
- Kiyotsu Gorge

- Location within Niigata Prefecture Location within Japan
- Location: Yuzawa and Tōkamachi, Japan
- Coordinates: 36°57′14″N 138°45′19″E

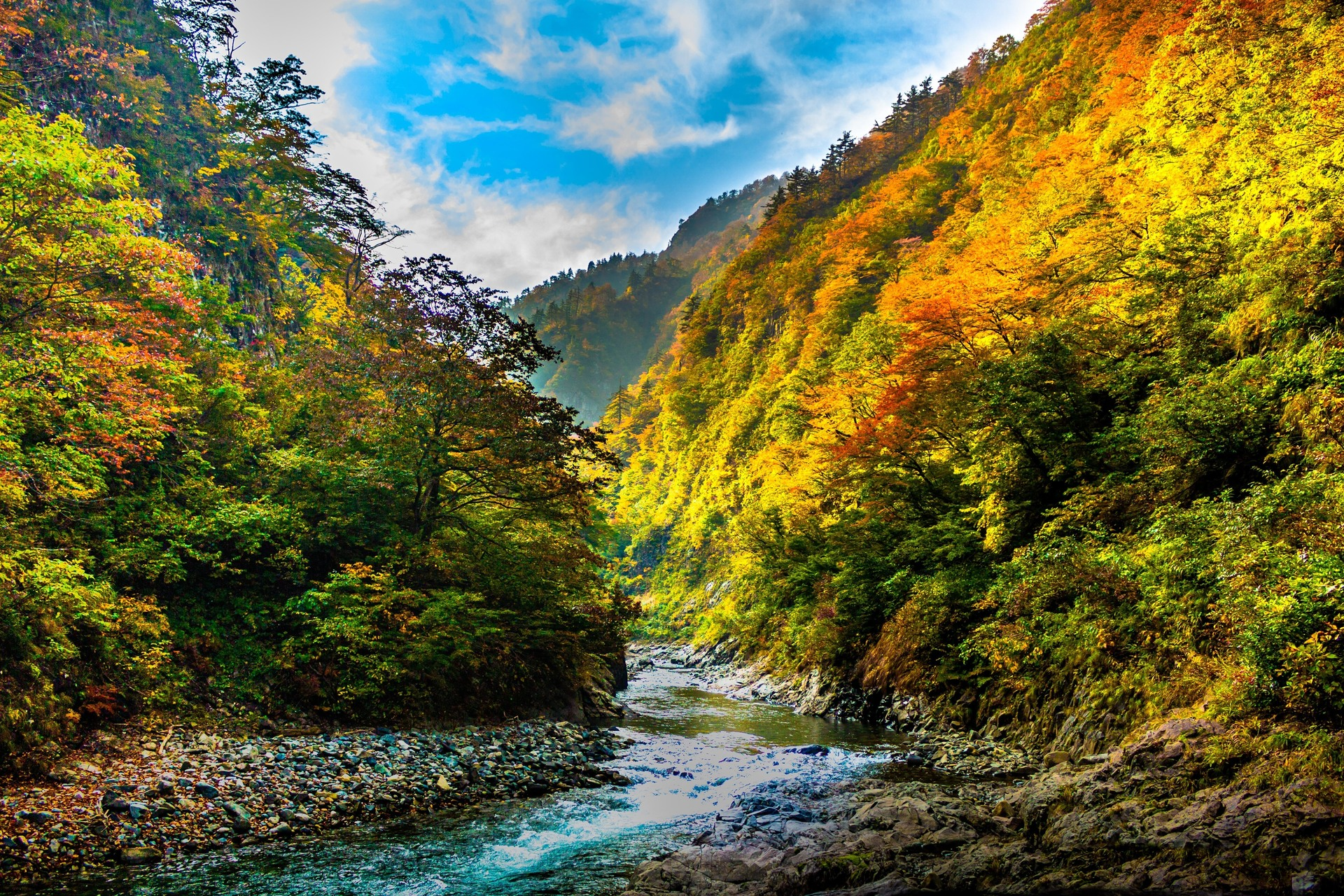

Kiyotsu Gorge (清津峡, Kiyotsu-kyō) is a nationally designated Place of Scenic Beauty and Natural Monument on the border between Yuzawa and Tōkamachi, Niigata Prefecture, Japan.

Kiyotsu-kyō is a canyon located on the Kiyotsu River with a total length is 12.5 kilometers within the Jōshin'etsu-kōgen National Park. The canyon is regarded as one of the three major canyons in Japan, along with the Kurobe Gorge and the Osugidani Gorge. A hot spring resort, the Kiyotsukyō Onsen, is located at the entry to the gorge and attracts a large number of visitors especially during autumn foliage season. There is a pedestrian tunnel with a total length of 750 meters along the wall of the gorge for sightseers. Formerly, there was a climbing path along the side of the river, but it was closed after a rockfall in 1988.

== See also ==
- List of Places of Scenic Beauty of Japan (Niigata)
