= Nishiotaki Dam =

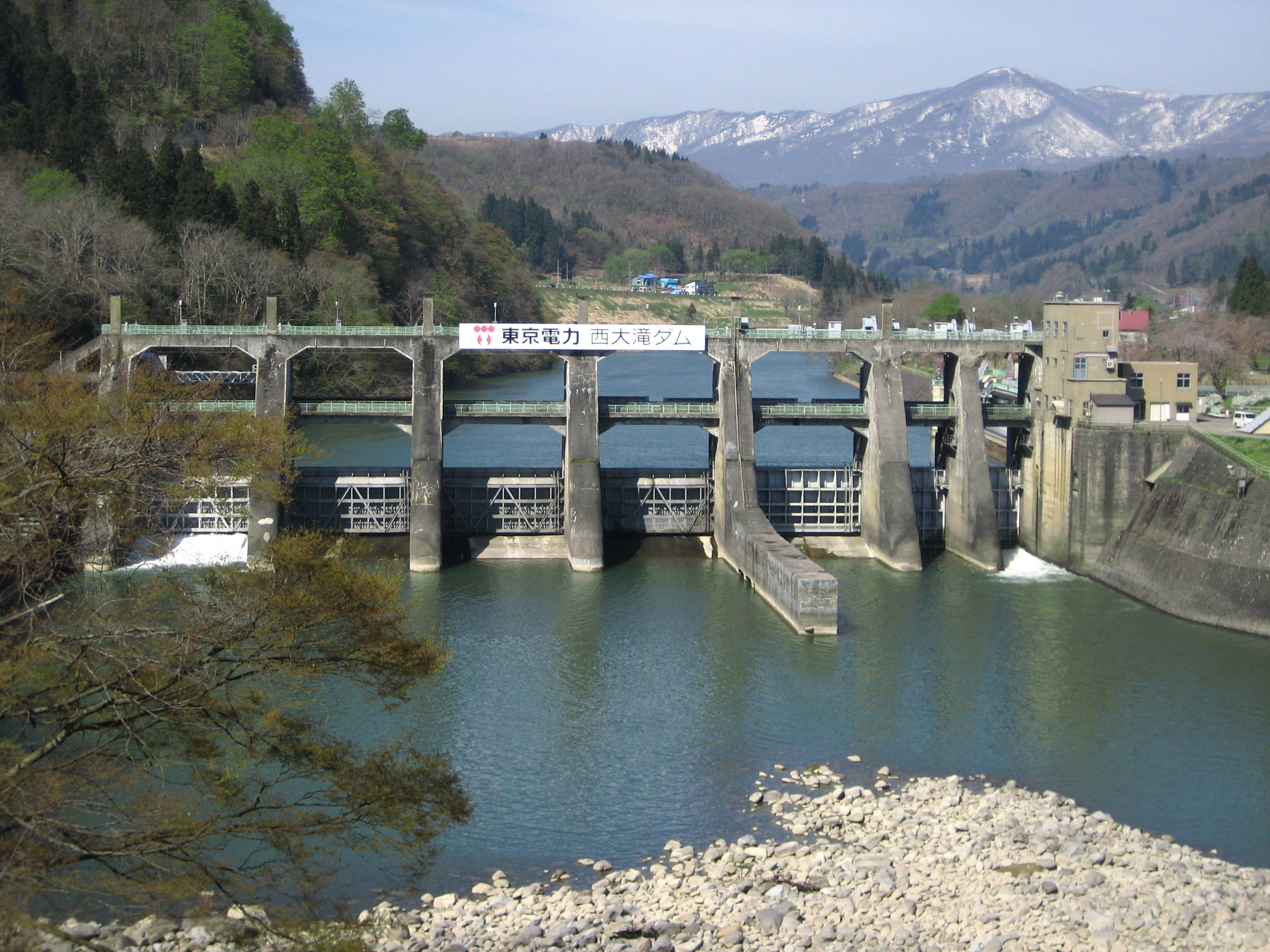
- Interactive map of Nishiotaki Dam
- Location: Nagano Prefecture, Japan
- Coordinates: 36°58′37″N 138°29′05″E

Nishiotaki Dam (Japanese: 西大滝ダム) is a dam in the Nagano Prefecture, Japan.
