= Japan National Route 253 =

National highway in Japan

National Route 253
- 国道253号
- Japan National Route 253 highlighted in red
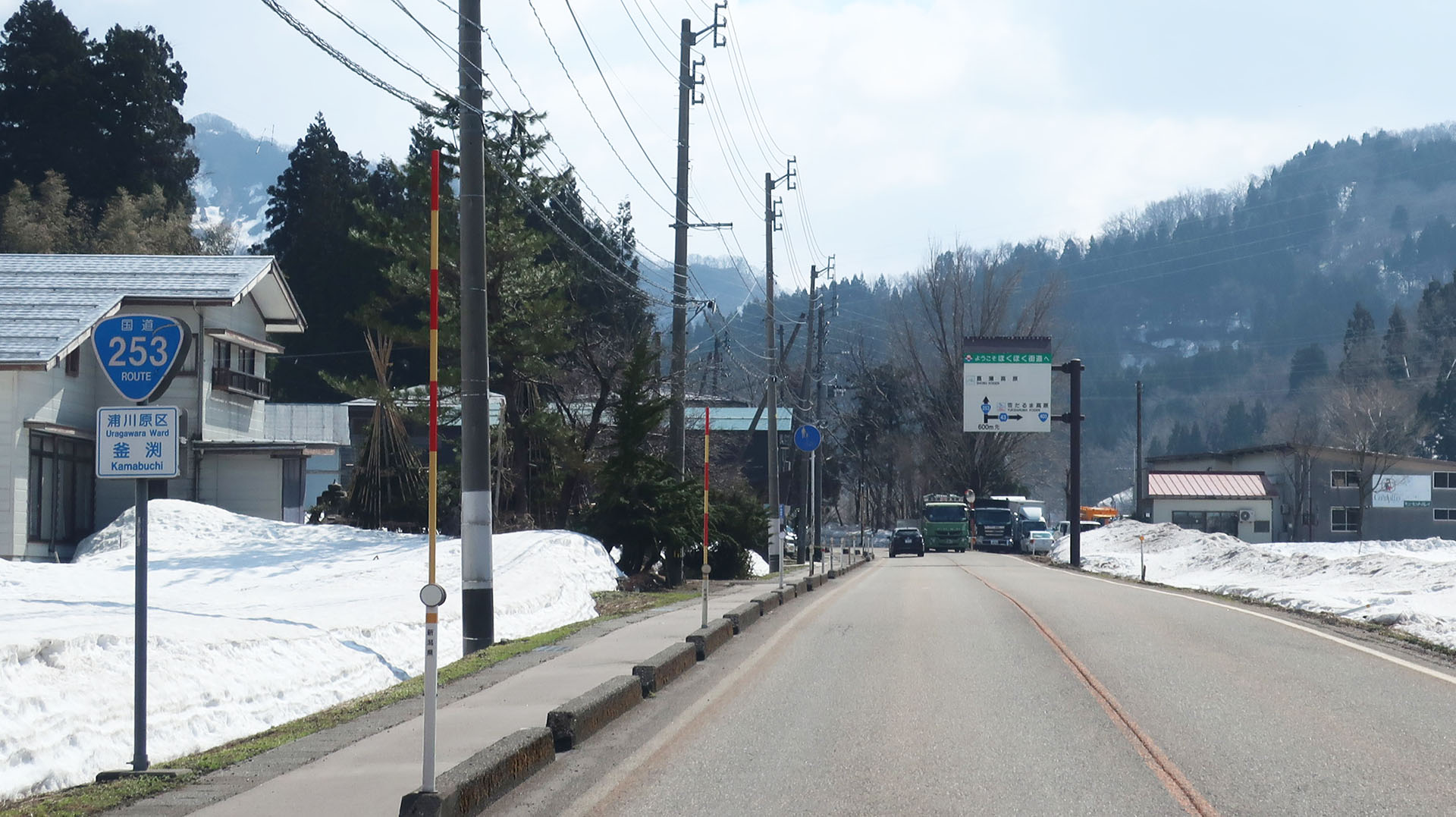

Route information
- Length: 67.8 km (42.1 mi)
- Existed: 1 April 1963–present

Location
- Country: Japan

Highway system
- National highways of Japan; Expressways of Japan
← National Route 252	→ National Route 254

National Route 253 is a national highway of Japan connecting Jōetsu, Niigata and Minamiuonuma, Niigata in Japan, with a total length of 67.8 km (42.13 mi).
