= Nakauonuma District, Niigata =

District in Niigata Prefecture, Japan

Coordinates: 36.995°N 138.636°E

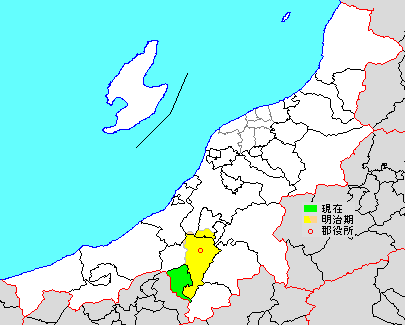
Map showing original extent of Nakauonuma District in Niigata Prefecture: * yellow – areas formerly within the district borders during the early Meiji period * green – current borders: 1. Tsunan-mura

Nakauonuma (中魚沼郡, Nakauonuma-gun) is a district located in Niigata Prefecture, Japan.

As of July 1, 2019, the district has an estimated population of 9,218 with a density of 54.2 persons per km^{2}. The total area is 170.21 km^{2}.

== Municipalities ==
The district consists of only one village:

- Tsunan (Note: Classified as a village.)

== History ==
- In 1954 – The town of Tōkamachi gained city status after merging with three villages and later gained more land by merging surrounding villages. There were some villages from the northside of the district that were merged into the city of Ojiya.

=== Recent mergers ===
- On April 1, 2005 – The town of Kawanishi, and the village of Nakasato were merged into the expanded city of Tōkamachi.
