= Japan National Route 353 =

Road in Japan

National Route 353
- 国道353号
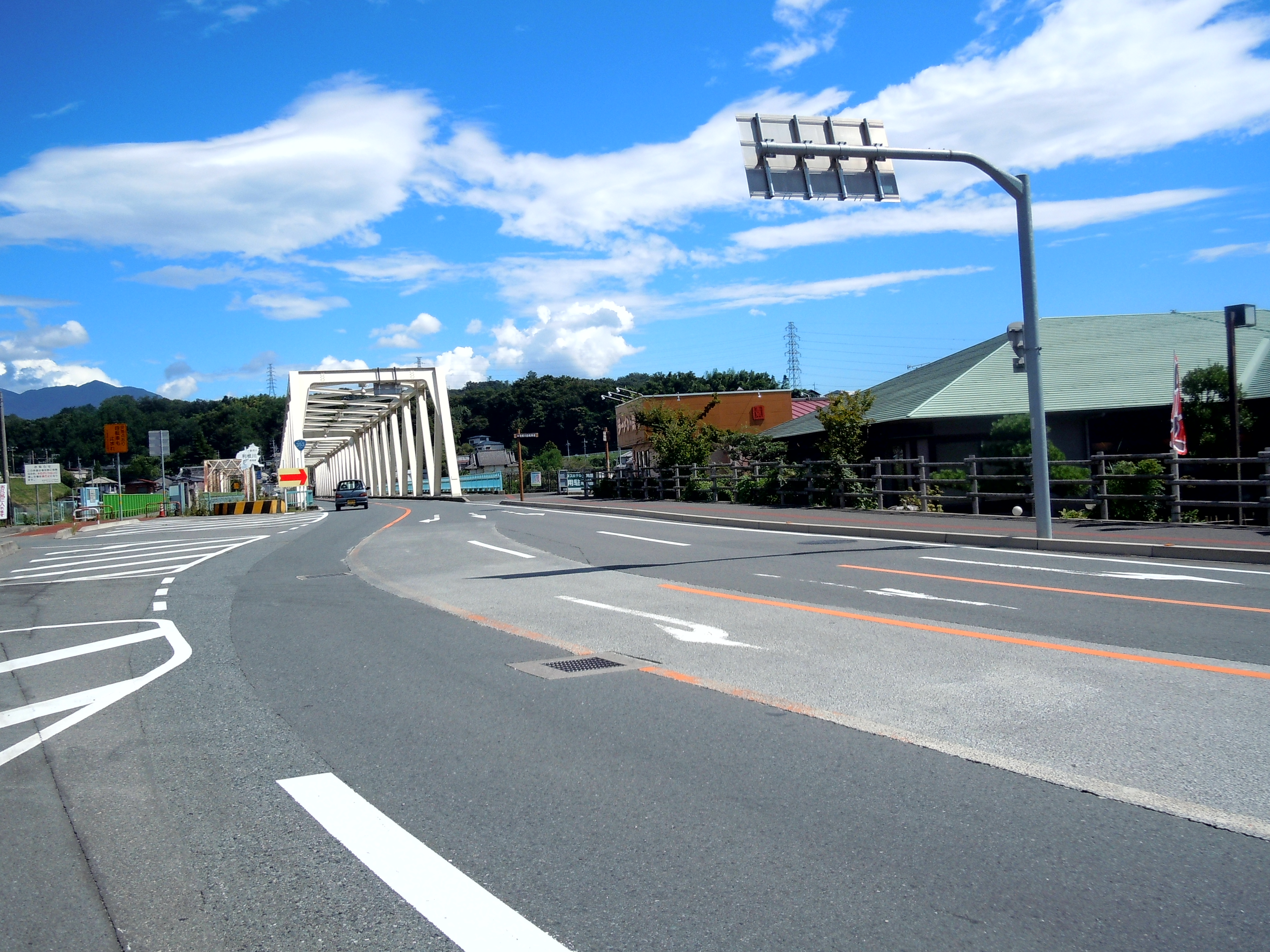

Route information
- Length: 187.4 km (116.4 mi)

Location
- Country: Japan

Highway system
- National highways of Japan; Expressways of Japan
| ← National Route 352 | → National Route 354 |

National Route 353 is a national highway of Japan connecting Kiryū, Gunma and Kashiwazaki, Niigata in Japan, with a total length of 187.4 km (116.44 mi). There is a section that is unfinished between Niigata and Gunma, therefore one cannot travel the whole length without significant detours.

== Route description ==
Two sections of National Route 353 in the city of Maebashi and in the town of Nakanojo in Gunma Prefecture are musical roads.
