= Nozawaonsen =

Nozawaonsen Village 野沢温泉村
- Village
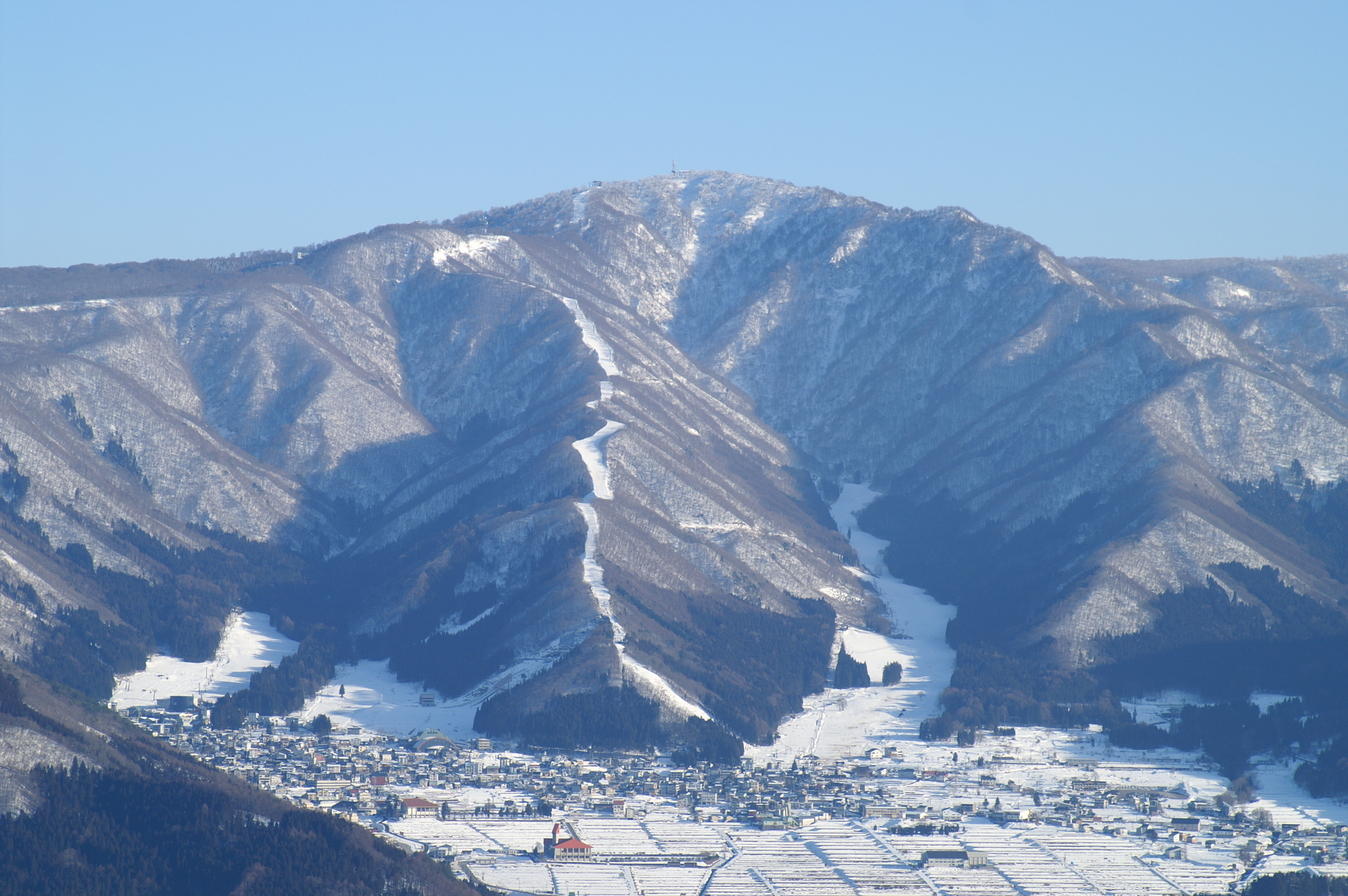
- View of Nozawaonsen Village

- Flag Seal

- Location of Nozawaonsen in Nagano Prefecture

- Coordinates: 36°55′22″N 138°26′26″E
- Country: Japan
- Region: Chūbu (Kōshin'etsu)
- Prefecture: Nagano
- District: Shimotakai

Area
  - Total: 57.96 km^{2} (22.38 sq mi)

Population (April 2019)
  - Total: 3,653
  - Density: 63.03/km^{2} (163.2/sq mi)
- Time zone: UTC+9 (Japan Standard Time)
- Address: 9817 Toyosato, Nozawaonsen-mura, Shimotakai-gun, Nagano-ken 389-2502
- Climate: Cfa/Dfa
- Website: Official website
- Symbols
- Flower: Nozawana
- Tree: Siebold’s beech

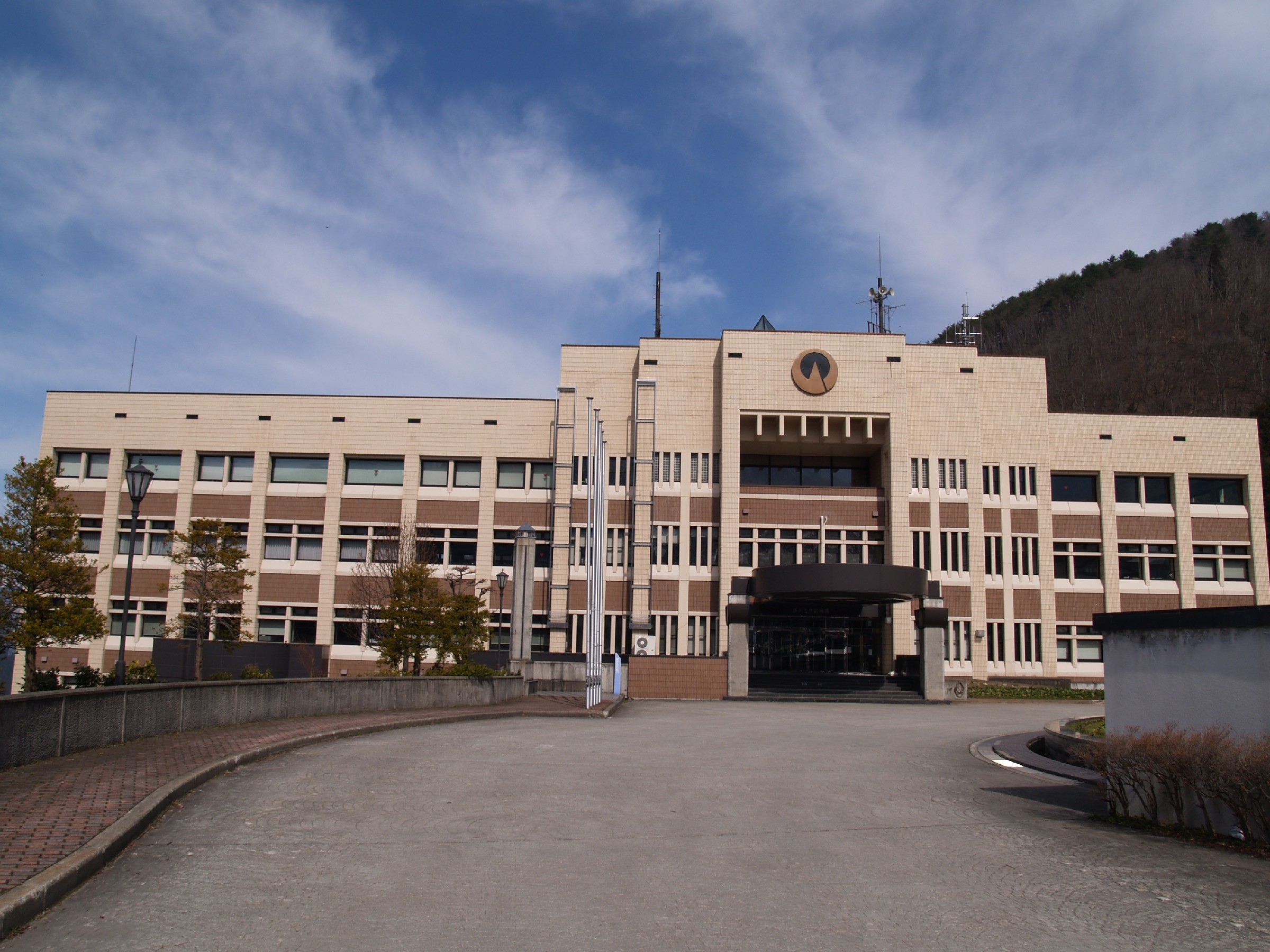
Nozawaonsen Village Hall

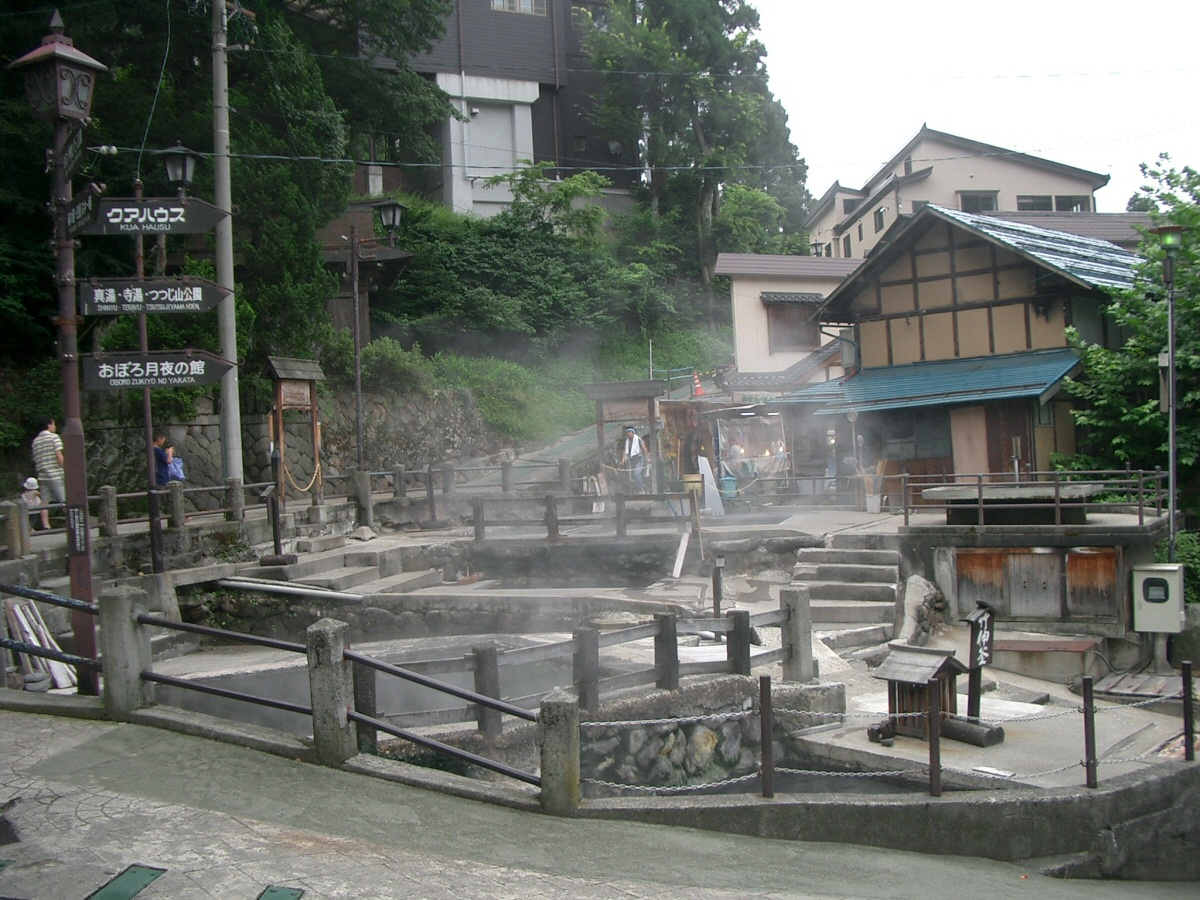
Onsen

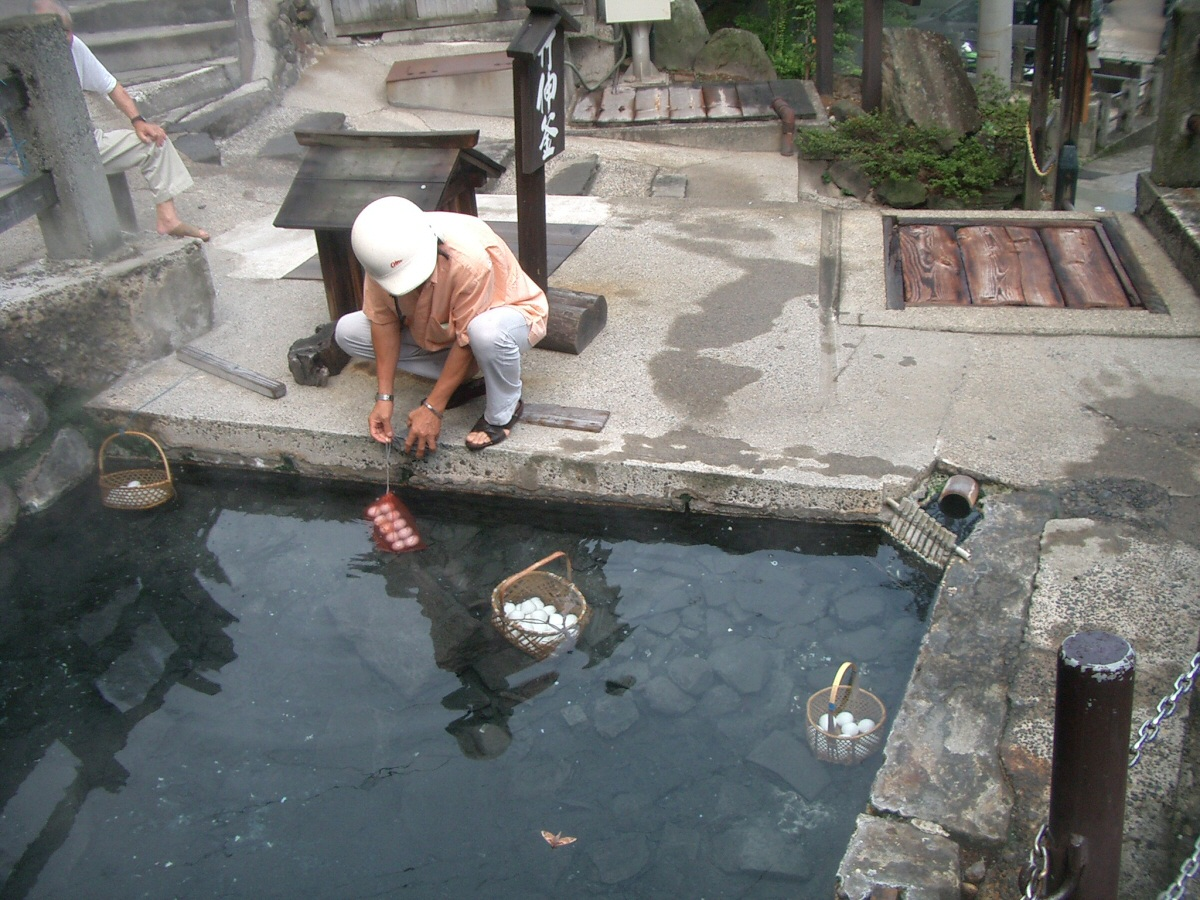
Onsen tamago

Nozawaonsen (野沢温泉村, Nozawaonsen-mura) is a village located in Nagano Prefecture, Japan. As of 1 April 2019, the village had an estimated population of 3,653 in 1,395 households and a population density of 63 persons per km². The total area of the village is 57.96 square kilometres (22.38 sq mi).

== Geography ==
Nozawaonsen is located in mountainous northeastern Nagano Prefecture, about one hour's drive from Nagano City. To the south it borders Kijimadaira along the ridge of Mount Kenashi. To the west side the Chikuma River, the longest river in Japan, which forms a border of the village with the city of Iiyama. The north and the east borders Sakae village. The altitude of Nozawaonsen ranges from 300 m above sea level at the lowest, to about 600 m in the village, and 1,650 m at the peak of Mount Kenashi.

=== Surrounding municipalities ===
- Nagano Prefecture
  - Iiyama
  - Kijimadaira
  - Sakae

=== Climate ===
The town has a humid continental climate (Köppen Dfa), characterized by warm and humid summers, and cold winters. The average annual temperature in Nozawaonsen is 10.4 °C (50.7 °F). The average annual rainfall is 1,781.7 mm (70.15 in) with January as the wettest month. The temperatures are highest on average in August, at around 23.3 °C (73.9 °F), and lowest in January, at around −1.6 °C (29.1 °F).

Climate data for Nozawaonsen (1991−2020 normals, extremes 1978−present)
Month	Jan	Feb	Mar	Apr	May	Jun	Jul	Aug	Sep	Oct	Nov	Dec	Year
Record high °C (°F)	12.9 (55.2)	16.2 (61.2)	20.7 (69.3)	28.7 (83.7)	30.8 (87.4)	33.0 (91.4)	34.6 (94.3)	36.4 (97.5)	34.4 (93.9)	30.4 (86.7)	22.0 (71.6)	19.3 (66.7)	36.4 (97.5)
Mean daily maximum °C (°F)	1.7 (35.1)	2.6 (36.7)	6.7 (44.1)	14.1 (57.4)	20.8 (69.4)	23.9 (75.0)	27.5 (81.5)	28.9 (84.0)	24.1 (75.4)	17.8 (64.0)	11.4 (52.5)	4.7 (40.5)	15.4 (59.6)
Daily mean °C (°F)	−1.6 (29.1)	−1.3 (29.7)	1.9 (35.4)	8.0 (46.4)	14.4 (57.9)	18.4 (65.1)	22.3 (72.1)	23.3 (73.9)	19.0 (66.2)	12.7 (54.9)	6.4 (43.5)	0.9 (33.6)	10.4 (50.7)
Mean daily minimum °C (°F)	−4.7 (23.5)	−4.9 (23.2)	−1.9 (28.6)	3.2 (37.8)	9.2 (48.6)	14.2 (57.6)	18.6 (65.5)	19.5 (67.1)	15.3 (59.5)	8.9 (48.0)	2.6 (36.7)	−2.1 (28.2)	6.5 (43.7)
Record low °C (°F)	−13.3 (8.1)	−15.5 (4.1)	−10.7 (12.7)	−5.7 (21.7)	0.2 (32.4)	3.9 (39.0)	11.3 (52.3)	10.2 (50.4)	4.8 (40.6)	−1.4 (29.5)	−5.3 (22.5)	−11.6 (11.1)	−15.5 (4.1)
Average precipitation mm (inches)	253.5 (9.98)	173.9 (6.85)	121.6 (4.79)	77.2 (3.04)	84.2 (3.31)	123.1 (4.85)	179.6 (7.07)	150.4 (5.92)	144.0 (5.67)	139.6 (5.50)	119.4 (4.70)	215.9 (8.50)	1,781.7 (70.15)
Average snowfall cm (inches)	366 (144)	282 (111)	170 (67)	35 (14)	0 (0)	0 (0)	0 (0)	0 (0)	0 (0)	0 (0)	16 (6.3)	223 (88)	1,087 (428)
Average precipitation days (≥ 1.0 mm)	22.1	17.7	16.7	11.1	10.5	11.9	13.7	11.7	12.7	12.1	14.4	18.9	173.5
Average snowy days (≥ 3 cm)	22.1	17.4	16.5	5.3	0	0	0	0	0	0	1.5	13.2	76
Mean monthly sunshine hours	58.9	73.4	111.5	166.9	205.8	156.0	155.5	189.5	133.7	129.1	106.9	75.8	1,562.9
Source: Japan Meteorological Agency

== History ==
The area of present-day Nozawaonsen was part of ancient Shinano Province. The name "Yuyama Village" (湯山村) lit. 'hot spring mountain village' appears in the mid-Kamakura period records, although per local legend the hot springs were discovered in the 8th century by the monk Gyoki. Per records dated 1870, there were 24 inns in the area, with 24,863 visitors for hot-spring cures.

The village of Toyosato was created on April 1, 1889, with the establishment of the modern municipalities system. Toyosato merged with the village of Takano to form the village of Zuiho on October 14, 1892. A portion of the village of Zuiho merged with the city of Iiyama on August 1, 1954, and the remaining portion became Nozawaonsen on April 1, 1955.

The village hosted the 1998 Winter Olympics biathlon event.

== Demographics ==
Per Japanese census data, the population of Nozawaonsen has decreased over the past 70 years.

Historical population
Year	Pop.	±%
1940	4,811	—
1950	6,716	+39.6%
1960	5,873	−12.6%
1970	5,155	−12.2%
1980	4,966	−3.7%
1990	4,816	−3.0%
2000	4,610	−4.3%
2010	3,854	−16.4%
2020	3,279	−14.9%

== Economy ==
The economy of Nozawaonsen is based on agriculture and seasonal tourism.

== Education ==
Nozawaonsen has one public elementary school, Nozawaonsen Elementary School (野沢温泉村立野沢温泉小学校), and one public junior high school, Nozawaonsen Junior High School (野沢温泉村立野沢温泉中学校), operated by the village government. The village does not have a high school.

== Transportation ==
=== Railway ===
Nozawaonsen has no direct passenger railway service, although five stations on the local Iiyama Line (Kamisakai, Kami-Kuwanagawa, Kuwanagawa, Nishi-Ōtaki and Shinano-Shiratori) lie within one kilometer of the village borders. Kamisakai and Togari-Nozawaonsen Stations are the closest stations to the village center.

The closest Shinkansen rail station is Iiyama Station, located roughly 25 minutes away by road. A bus service is run by the village which coincides with the Shinkansen timetable.

=== Highway ===
- National Route 117

== International relations ==
- – St Anton am Arlberg, Austria, sister city since February 7, 1971

== Local attractions ==
- Nozawa Onsen Snow Resort

=== Local food specialities ===
- Apples
- Beer (made by the Anglo Japanese Brewing Company)
- Mountain vegetables
- Nozawana (pickled vegetable)
- Oyaki Manjū (dumplings steamed over onsen water)
- Shinshu Soba

=== Cultural attractions ===
There are 18 designated cultural treasures in the village; the Dosojin Fire Festival is a national cultural treasure (designated as an Important Intangible Folk Cultural Property, in December 1993) while the others, including a 300-year-old cedar tree by the main shrine, are designated by the village.

=== Nozawaonsen Fire Festival ===
The village's most important festival is the Nozawaonsen Fire Festival (野沢温泉の道祖神祭り, Nozawaonsen no dōsojin matsuri) held every January 15; it forms part of a nationwide culture of honoring folk deities, particularly Dosojin.

This is a three-day event, with the most visible element being the battle to burn down a three-story wooden shrine (社殿 shadan) on the evening of January 15. It is not certain when the festival started, but records from 1863 suggest that it was already well-established by then.

The festival is organized by the men of the village who are 40, 41, and 42 years old; hence there is a three-year period when every male villager is closely involved in the festival. They are directed by a master carpenter chosen for his experience. The other group involved are the 25-year-old men of the village. The ages of 42 and 25 are unlucky ages, or ages where spiritual cleansing is needed, and are called yakudoshi. Participation in the event is a mandatory rite of passage for all males living in the village, regardless of whether they were born in the village or not, and is also a way to create bonds and relationships.

Part of the significance of the festival is to celebrate boys born during the previous year, and lucky families will create totem poles (初灯籠 Hatsuakarikago). These are elaborate 9-10m tall umbrella-like structures, made of oak at the bottom and cedar at the top. The family crest sits on top of the pole. The next layer down are wind chimes, and the lower layer consists of long strips of paper with charms and well-wishes written by relatives and friends. The structure is made in the autumn, and displayed outside the house from January 11. On January 15 it is taken to the fire festival ground, where it will form part of the final conflagration.

The wood that will make the shadan is chosen, cut, and brought down from the mountain to the village during the previous autumn. The 20m-long Japanese Beech is dragged from the Hikage ski area through the village, on January 13, by teams of chanting yakudoshi villagers. Sake is handed out to onlookers.

The shadan is built all day on the 14th, and until early afternoon on the 15th. Standing 10m high and 8m wide, construction can be dangerous so the work is carried out in silence and without sake. No nails or wire are used in the construction, and the construction is exactly the same every year.

At 7pm the representatives gather to light the fire by striking a flint, which has been handed down for generations. They sing the dosojin song while drinking large amounts of sake. The flame is used to light large torches, and the procession heads to the temporary shrine at 8pm. Sake is handed out to onlookers.

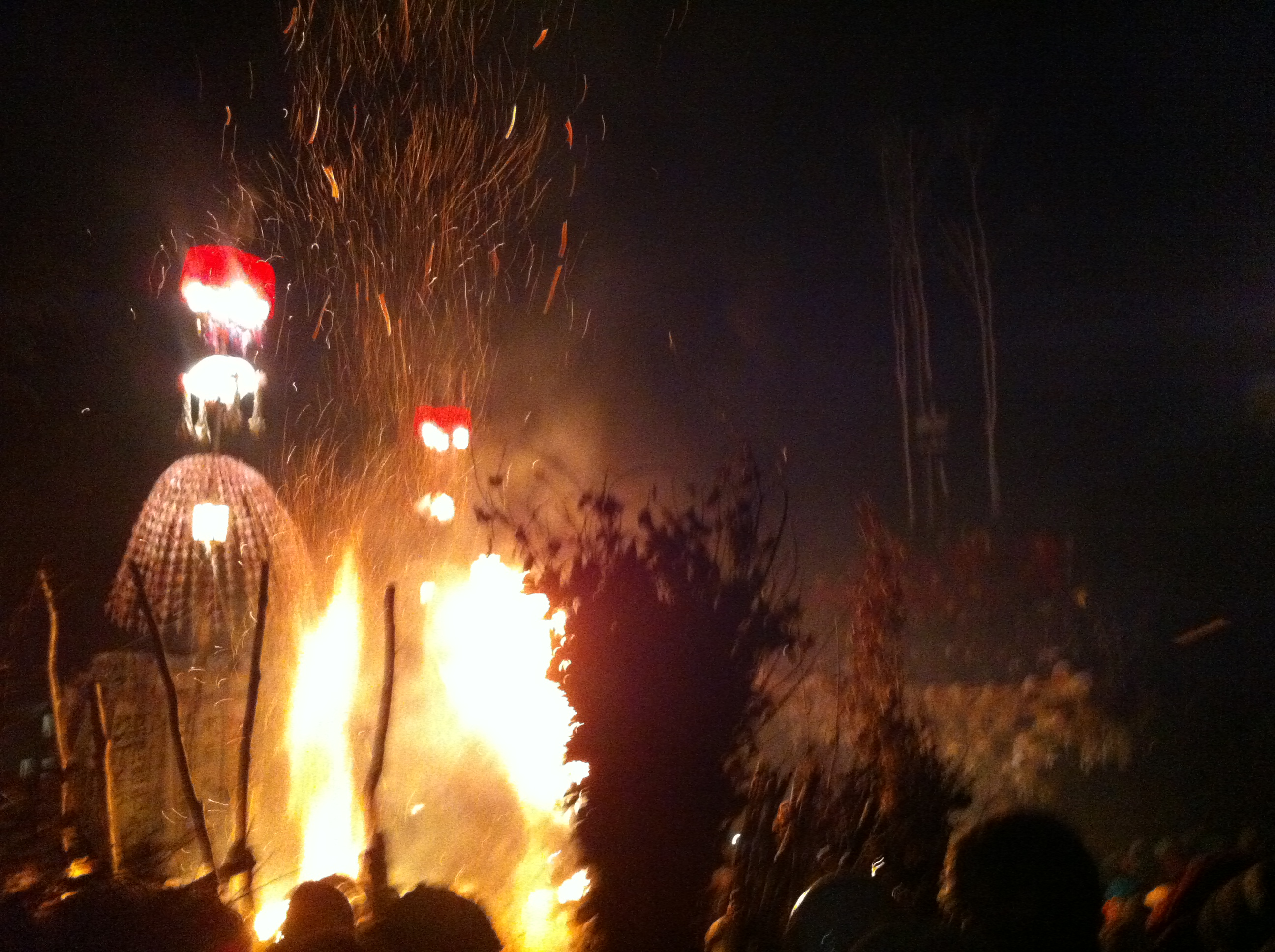
The night of January 15th

At about 8:30pm the procession reaches the grounds. The torches are used to light a bonfire, from which other torches are lit, and are used to attack the shadan. The festival organizers are the first to attack the shrine, followed by children, followed by all the men of the village. Their objective is to burn down the shrine, and the methodology is to light a large torch from the bonfire, and then run to the shadan, attempting to charge through the 25-year old yakudoshi who are stationed at the bottom of the shrine, and set fire to the structure. The 25-year old yakudoshi use physical force to prevent the attacks. The 42-year old yakudoshi are seated at the top of the shrine.

The attacks succeed in setting fire to the structure after one and a half to two hours, and the shadan burns through the night.

Safety is an issue and the 25-year old yakudoshi are assigned guardians who do not drink sake.

The festival attracts many visitors and accommodation is often booked a year in advance. Sake is handed out to onlookers.

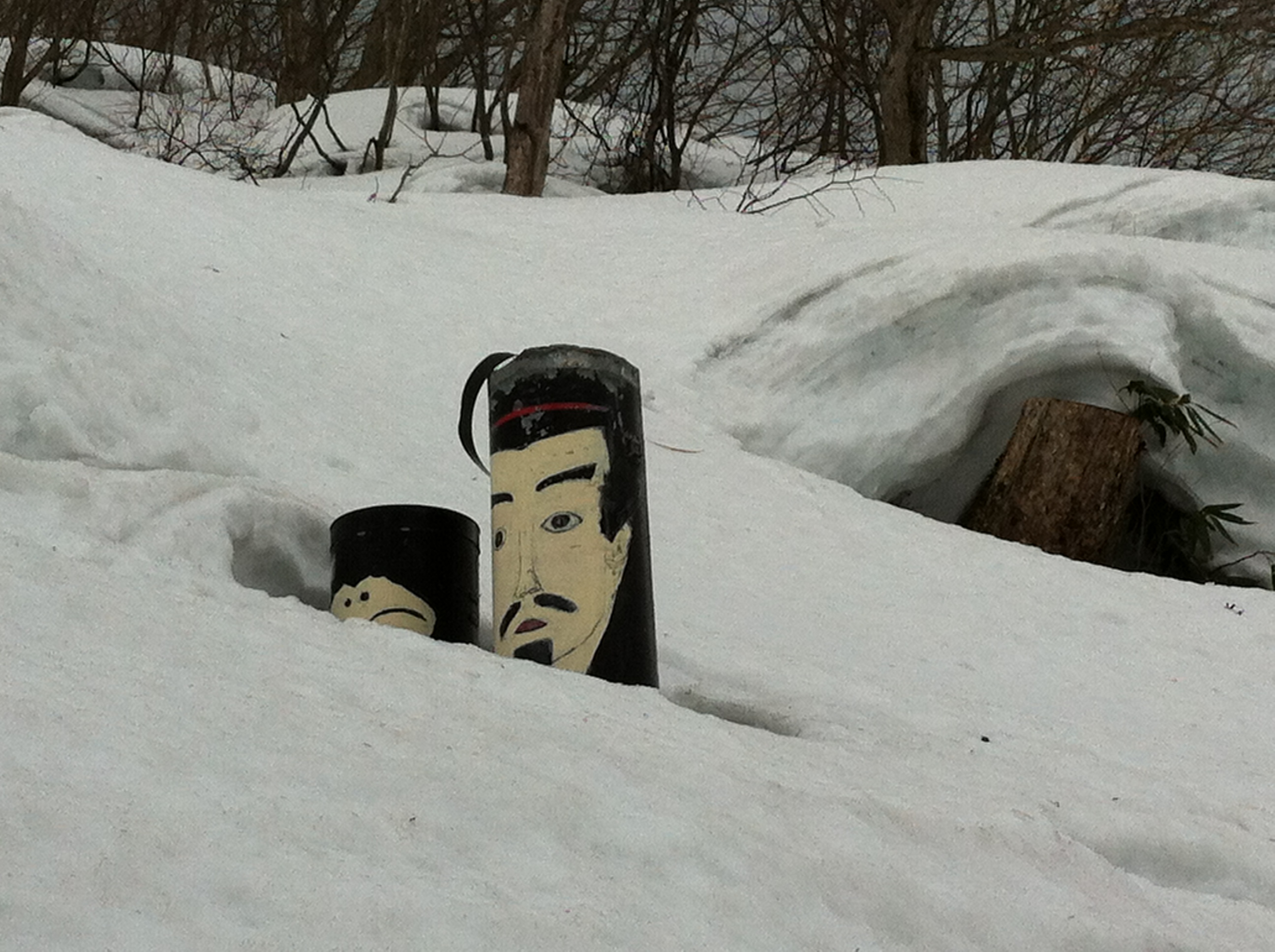
Dosojin

Dosojin statues are common throughout Japan, but the wooden, pencil-like figures found in Nozawaonsen are unusual as (i) they are ubiquitous throughout the village (ii) they are made of wood, and painted. They represent a male and female deity. There is a folk tradition that they represent a man and a woman who were not particularly attractive, but nevertheless married and had baby boys, therefore representing the happiness of marriage. Every household in the village will have a pair, and they are often found at businesses and public places too.

== Notable people ==
- Takanori Kono (Nordic combined skier)
- Jinya Nishikata (ski jumper)
- Tatsuyuki Takano (songwriter)
- Gen Tomii (Nordic combined skier)
