= Nozawana =

Japanese leaf vegetable, often pickled

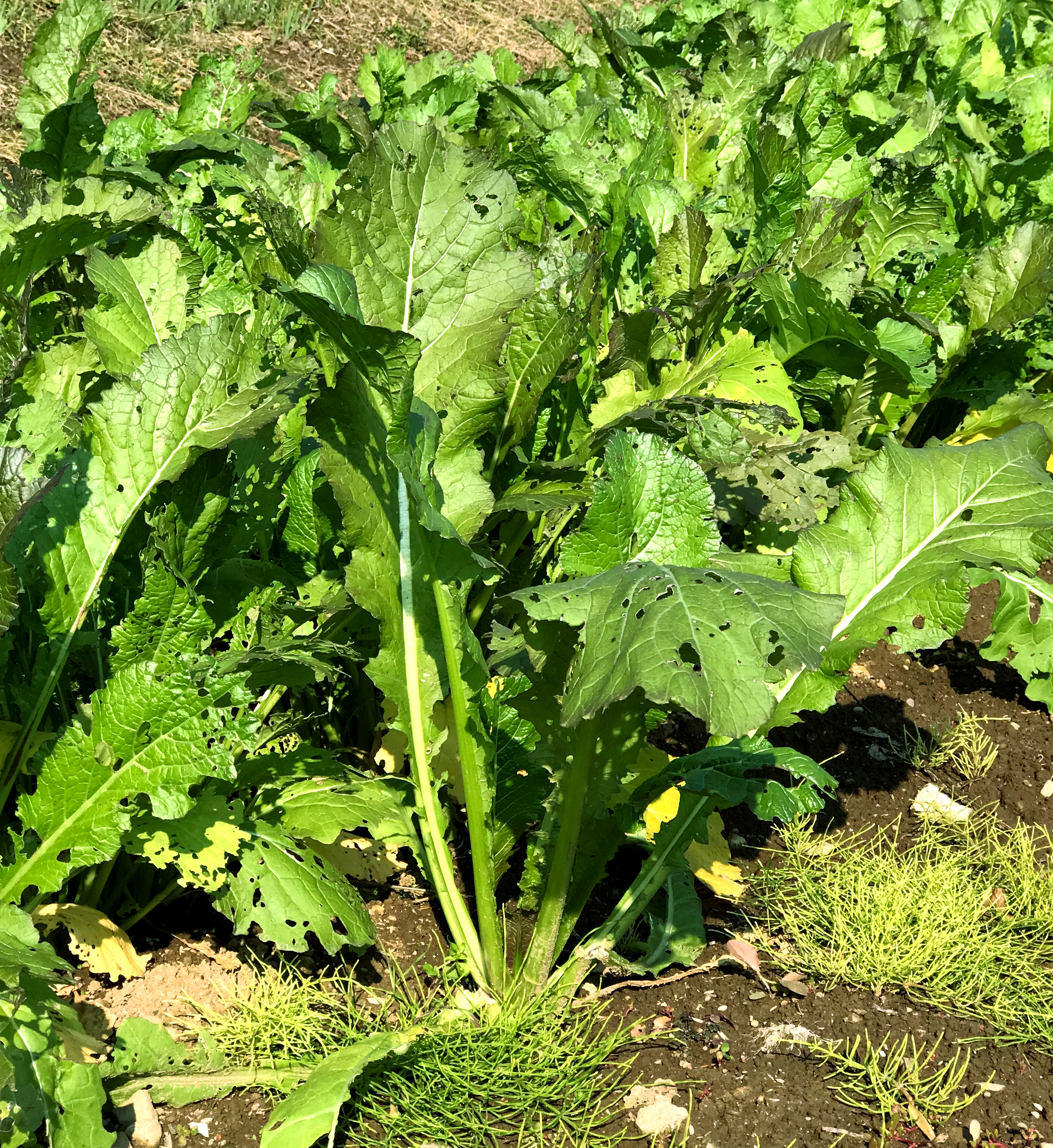
- Genus: Brassica
- Species: Brassica rapa
- Variety: B. rapa var. hakabura
- Origin: Japan

Nozawana (野沢菜), Brassica rapa var. hakabura, is a Japanese leaf vegetable, a cultivated variety of Brassica rapa in the brassica family. It is a biennial plant often pickled that has been cultivated in the Shin'etsu region, centered around the village of Nozawaonsen, Shimotakai District, Nagano Prefecture. It is of the same species as the common turnip and one of a number of Japanese varieties of leaf mustard.

Also known as shinshūna (信州菜), it is counted as one of Japan's three major pickled vegetables, along with takana and hiroshimana. After World War II, it grew nationwide, from Hokkaido to Kumamoto.

== Background ==
Nozawana is part of the turnip family. Currently, it is thought to be a different variety derived from the turnip (var. hakabura, turnip greens), and is currently being used as a traditional pickled vegetable grown in the area (inekokina, haburona, narusawana, chōzenna). Both turnips and purple turnips (Suwa beni turnip, Hososhima turnip, etc.) are thought to be closely related.

Tradition holds that sometime between 1751 and 1764 the plant was brought from the Kyoto mountains to the village of Nozawaonsen by the master of a Buddhist temple, Kenmeiji, who lived in Nozawa. It has been cultivated around that area ever since, and thus is now called "Nozawana" (na means vegetable in Japanese). Also known as shinshuuna (信州菜), nozawana is one of Japan's three major pickled vegetables, along with Takana and hiroshimana.

Turnips in Japan are broadly divided into the Asian variety (i.e. bomdong) via China, which is prevalent in western Japan, and the European variety (Brassica rapa) via Siberia, common in the mountainous areas of eastern Japan and has excellent cold resistance.

Pickled nozawana is among the most typical local foods in Nagano Prefecture. It is also used in onigiri. Before the Taishō era (1912–1926), local villagers called the plant a turnip. Skiers from the city who visited a local ski resort were so impressed by the pickled turnip that they nicknamed it "Nozawanazuke". From then on became known as Nozawana and Nozawana pickled throughout the country. After World War II, it began to be grown nationwide, from Hokkaido to Kumamoto.

Its leaves are approximately 60–90 centimetres (24–35 in) long. If left to overwinter without harvesting, the rapeseed will sprout and yellow rapeseed flowers will bloom in the spring.

== Cultivation ==
For cultivation, seeds are sown in September and thinned out repeatedly, with the thinned seedlings eaten as pickled vegetables. The following spring, buds will grow from the remaining roots after the snow thaws. These flowers can be harvested and used as vegetables (totachina), or as new seeds that can be sown to grow spring mustard and Japanese warbler. The leafy above-ground part grows further and blooms in May, and its seeds are collected in June. The leaves are harvested from October through December and used primarily for pickled nozawana.

At Nozawa Onsen, nozawana has been cultivated as a successor crop on arable land known as "Obatake", where hemp was cultivated until the Meiji period. The original seed of nozawana called "teradane" is grown in the field of the residence of Kenmeiji Temple in Nozawa Onsen, and is sold as "turnip seed".

In the areas where Nozawa onsen's bathers went and the areas where nozawana was cultivated are almost the same, as visitors to Nozawa Onsen bought turnip seeds as souvenirs.

The lyrics for "Oborozukiyo", which begins with "Enter the rape field and the sun fades," were written by Tatsuyuki Takano, who was born in Nagae Village, Nagano Prefecture (now Oaza Nagae, Nakano City). In the Hokushin region of Nagano Prefecture, rapeseed has been cultivated as a major cash crop since the Edo period, and it is assumed that the motif of the lyrics was the memory of rapeseed rape blossoms spreading all over the place.

When the demand for rapeseed oil decreased and rapeseed cultivation ceased, rape blossoms disappeared, but in recent years the nozawana flowers grown for tourism have become popular. In Europe there is a vegetable called turnip tops, and known as cima di rapa in Italy. Although it is not classified as a turnip, it is similar to nozawana in that its roots enlarge like a turnip, but are not edible.

== Pickling ==
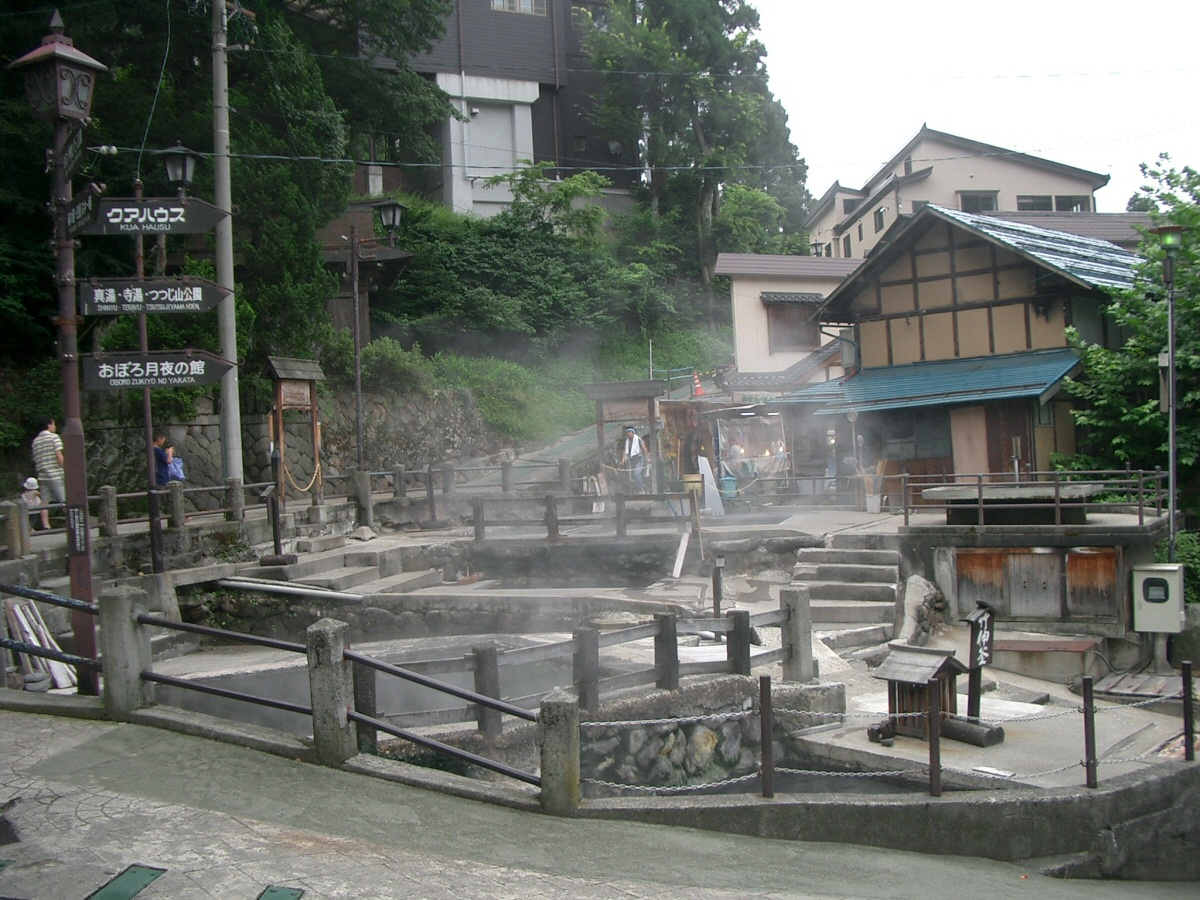
Hemp pot for washing dishes (Nozawa Onsen)

When harvested, the turnip greens are separated from the roots (the turnips). The greens are washed in a communal bath (i.e. onsen), and then soaked in a large wooden bucket. In its preparation, each family has their own seasonings.

There are honzuke (pickled shallots), which have undergone lactic acid fermentation and has turned amber color, and with a light pickle, remains green.

Because it is manufactured and stored in a cold environment, fermentation does not progress very far, and it is characterized by a light taste and low odor. If left at room temperature, it will rapidly soften, change its texture, and increase its sour taste, so it must be kept at a low temperature for storage. It is widely loved as an accompaniment to tea and drinks. In addition to eating it as is, it has a wide range of uses, such as being used in stir-fried dishes and fried rice, or chopped into small pieces and mixed with nattō as a condiment. It is also popular as an ingredient in rice balls and oyaki. Those with a strong sour taste are sometimes stir-fried with soy sauce, sugar, and oil and eaten as "tsukudani style".

In the Hokushin region of Nagano Prefecture, nozawana is called "Ona" or "Nappa", and nozawana pickled vegetables are called "Ohazuke".

In Nagano Prefecture, the production area, there was a problem in supplying green pickled vegetables all year round. Mainly produced in Shizuoka Prefecture, from March to May, tunnel-grown products are mainly produced in Yamanashi and Nagano prefectures, in June, mainly produced in Ibaraki prefecture, and from July to September, mainly produced in Yatsugatake in Nagano prefecture. The solution was to move the production area from the middle of the mountain to Togakushi .

In 1983, Nagano Prefecture selected nozawana pickles as a "Nagano Prefecture Selected Intangible Folk Cultural Property, Cultural Property of Shinano Taste."

== Gallery ==
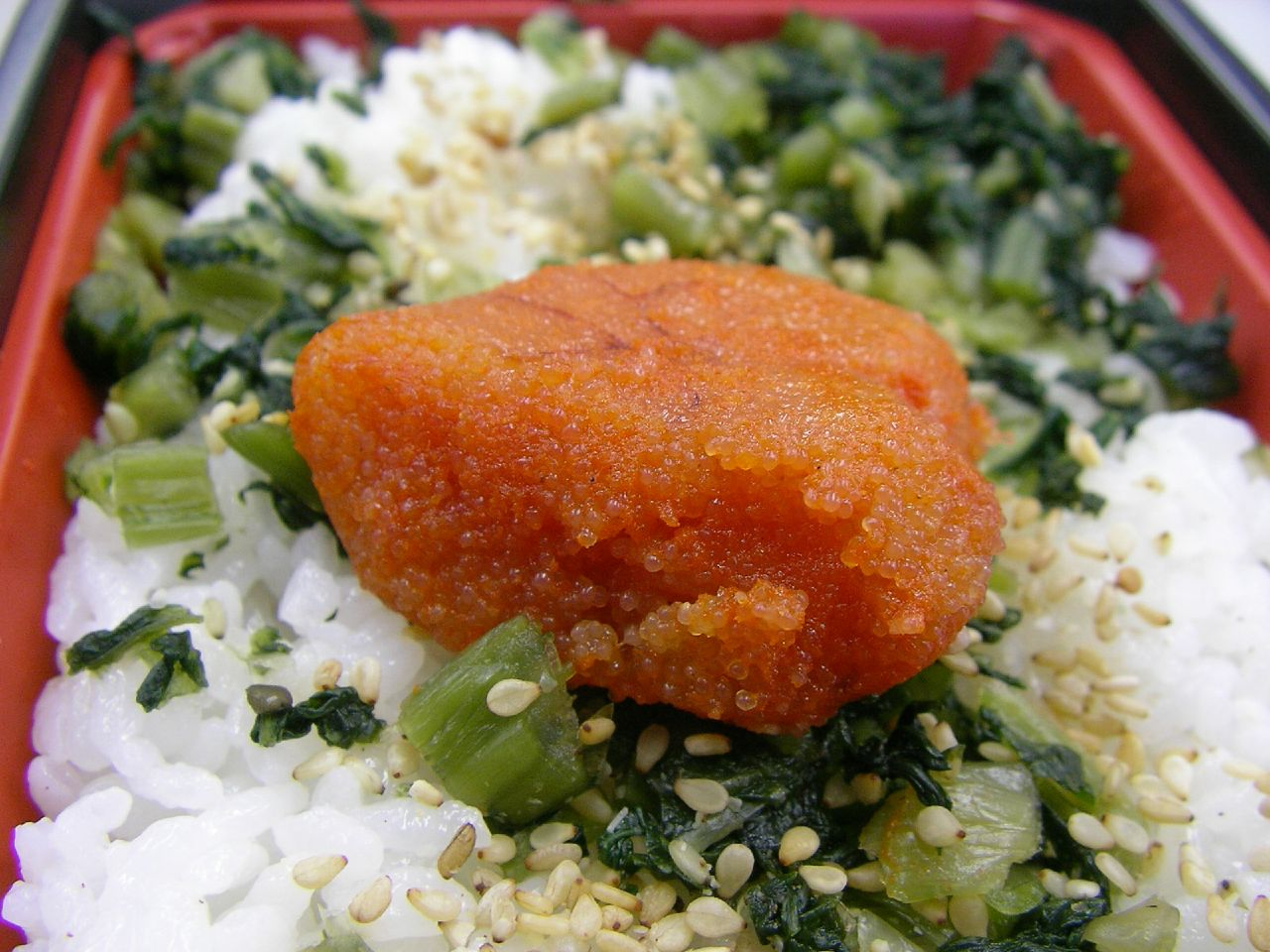
Mentaiko and nozawana on rice

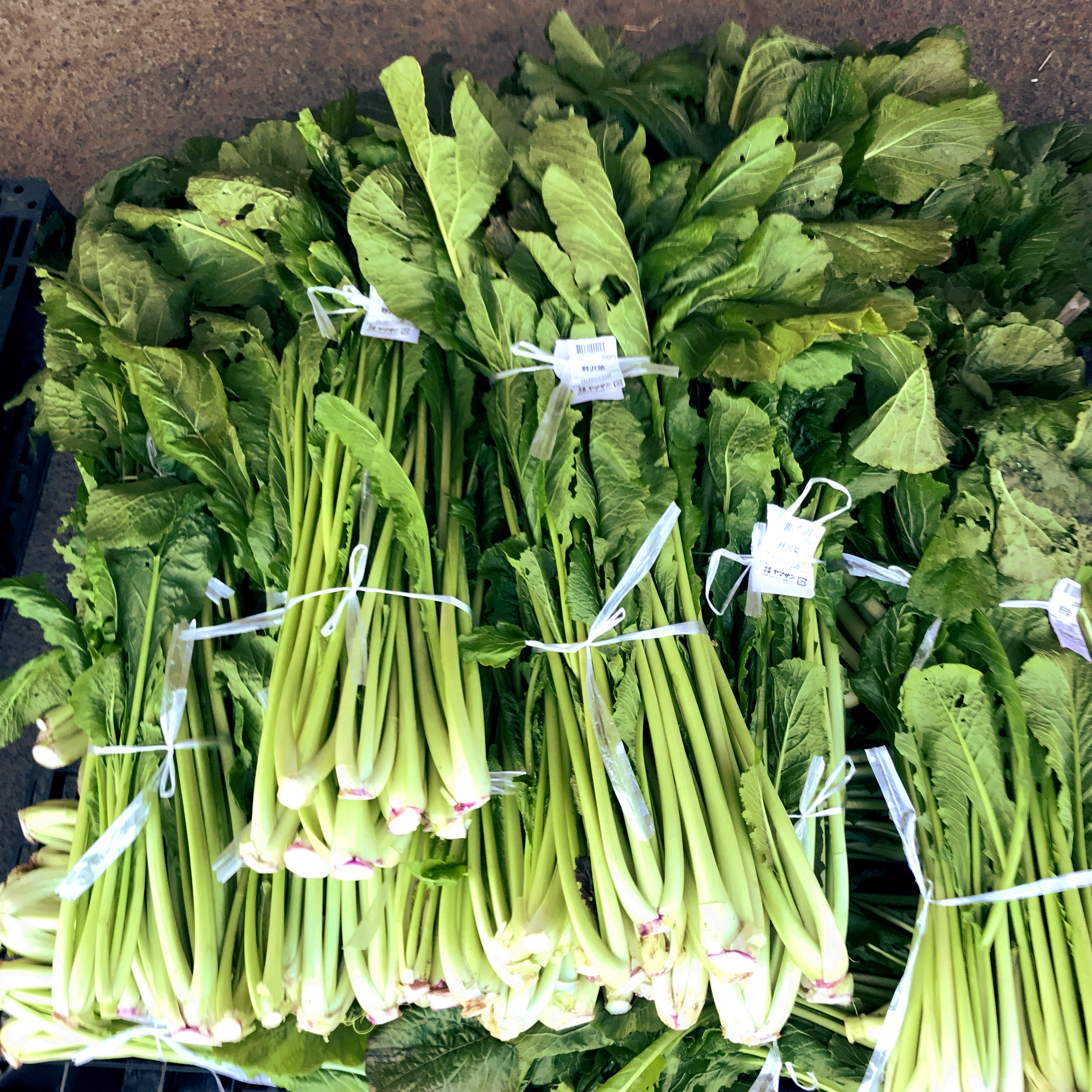
Nozawana sold in bundles

== See also ==
- Tsukemono
- Onsen tamago
