= Festival of fire =

Celebrations featuring fire or flames

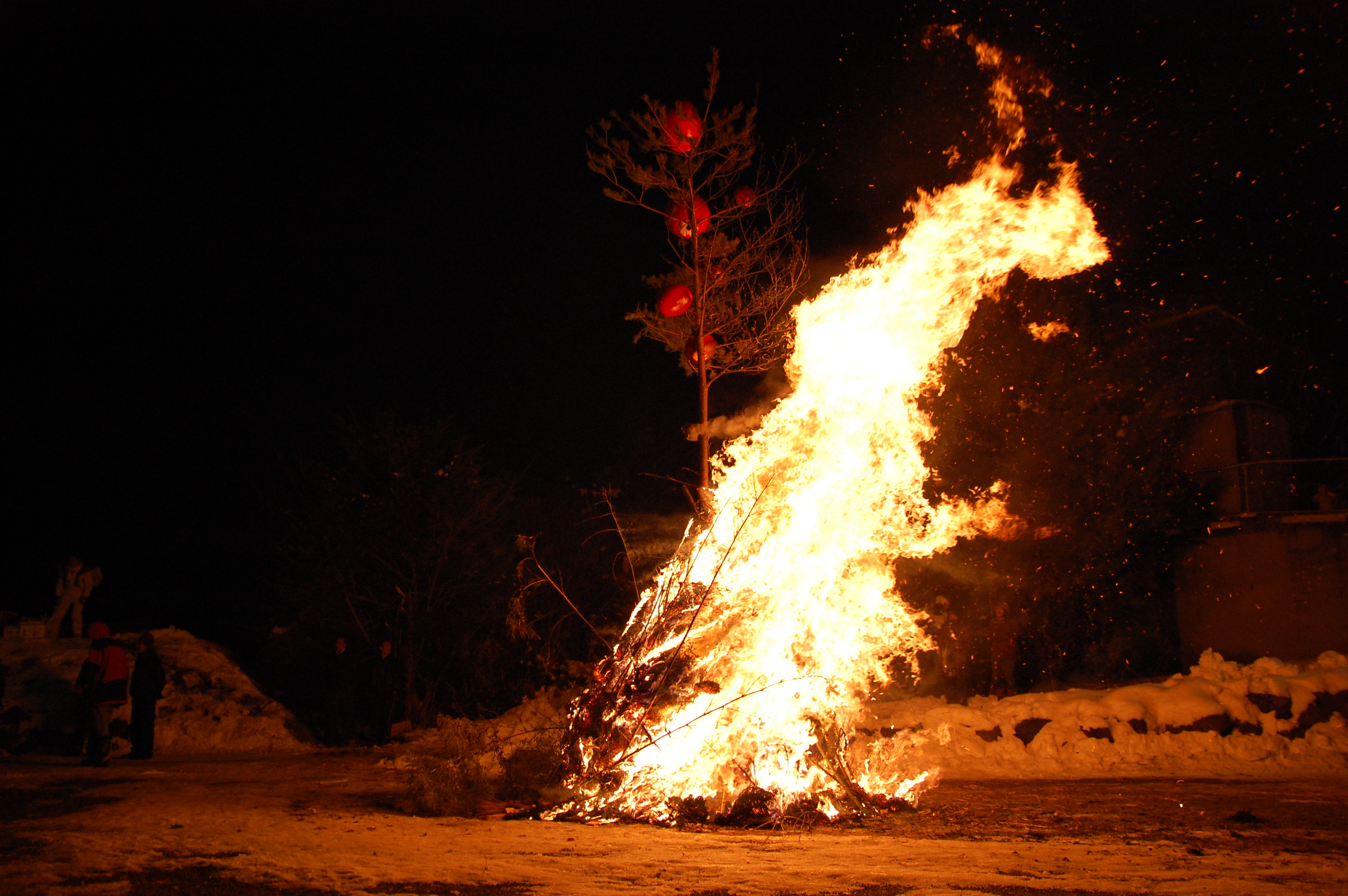
Sagicho Fire Festival in Japan

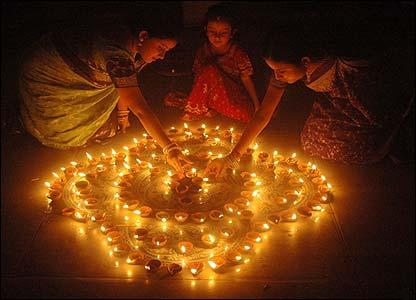
Diwali in India

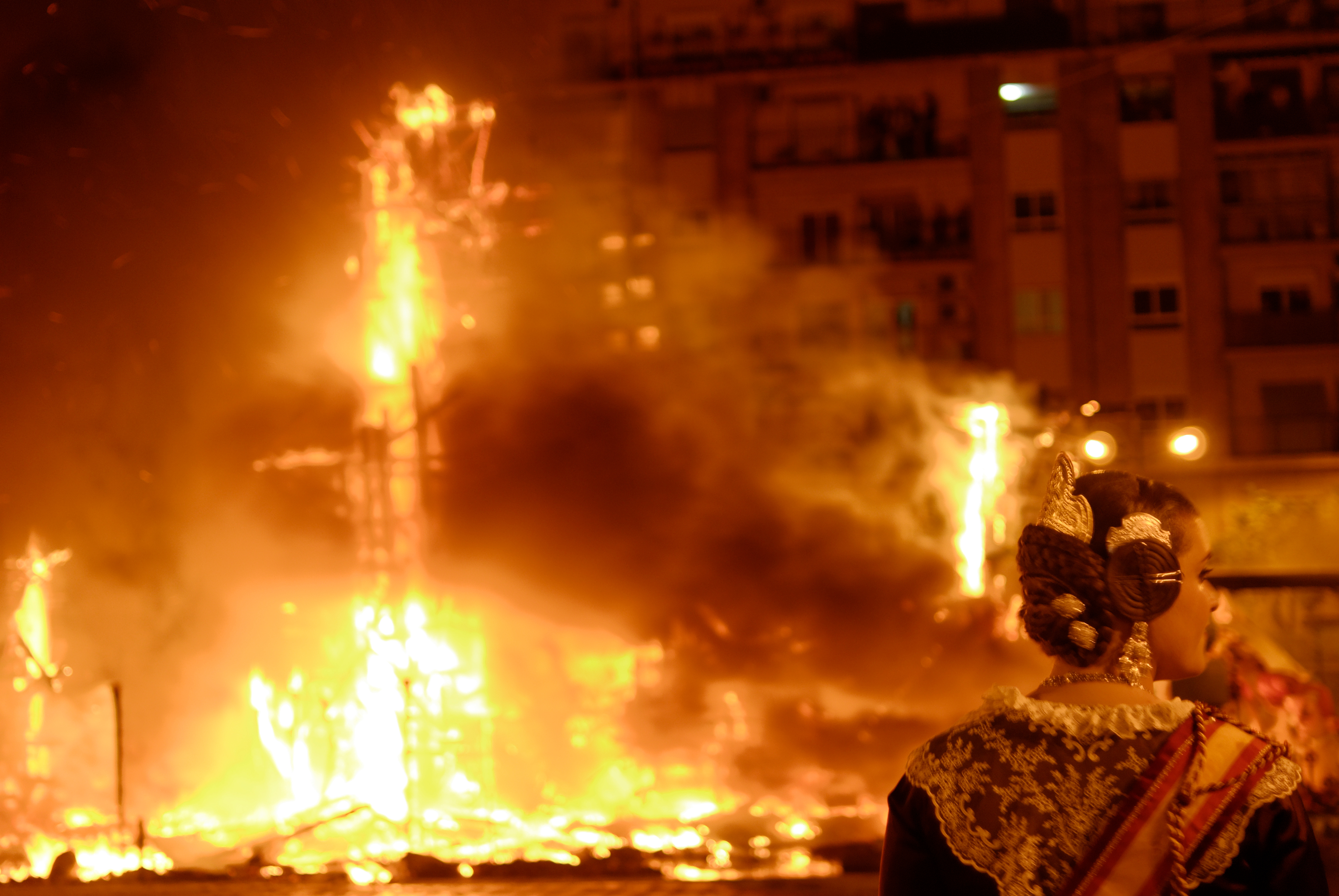
Falles in Spain

Festivals featuring themes of fire or flame are celebrated in many cultures and locations around the world.

== Festivals ==
=== Africa ===
- AfrikaBurn, Burning Man inspired event in South Africa

=== Americas ===
- Bonfire Night, Canada
- Burning Man, alternative and bohemian event in the Black Rock Desert, Nevada, US

=== Asia ===
- Burning of the Character Big, Japan
- Diwali, festival in India and global Hindu communities
- Gozan no Okuribi, Kyoto, Japan
- The Oroqens' Fire Festival ([jp]), Hokkaido, Japan
- Sagicho Fire Festival, in many places in Japan
- The Yi people's Torch Festival, China
- Chaharshanbe Suri, Iranian new year celebration from Zoroastrian origin

=== Europe ===
- Beltane Fire Festival, Edinburgh, Scotland
- Bonfires of Saint John, Alicante, Spain
- Falles, Valencia, Spain
- Guy Fawkes Night, United Kingdom
- Sechseläuten, Zurich, Switzerland
- Up Helly Aa, Shetland, Scotland

== Other uses ==
- Wrestling Festival of Fire, the annual professional wrestling tournament
- Fire Festival, a Japanese drama film

== See also ==
- Festival of Lights (disambiguation)
- Outline of festivals
