= Mount Myōjō =

Mountain in Japan

Coordinates: 35°15′22″N 139°04′03″E

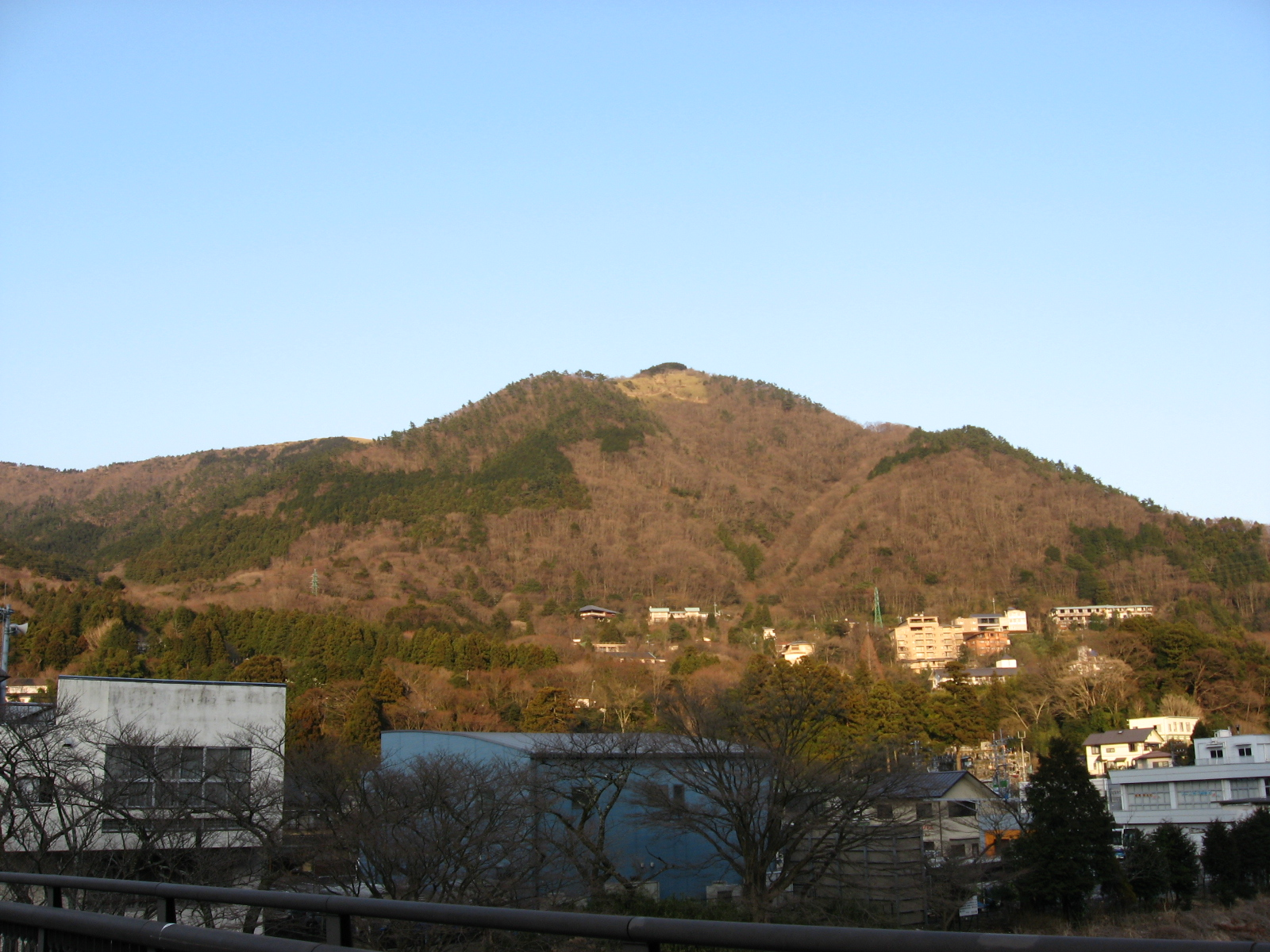
Looking east to Mount Myōjō

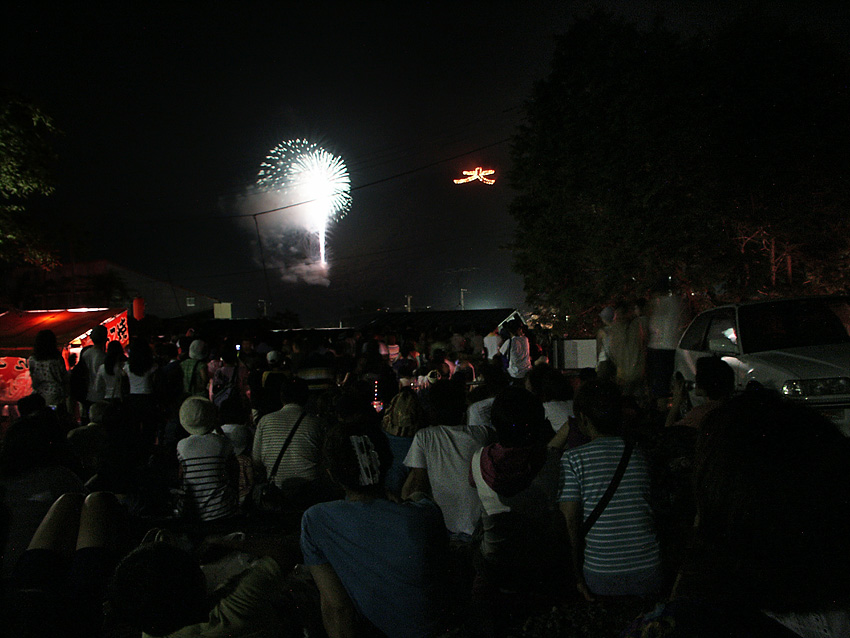
The Burning of the Character Big (大) on Mount Myōjō (2005)

Mount Myōjō or Myōjōgatake (Japanese: 明星ヶ岳) is a mountain with an altitude of 924 meters on the border of Odawara and Hakone, Kanagawa, as one of the ancient sommas on Mount Hakone's old outer rim. It is part of Fuji-Hakone-Izu National Park.

Although it is a low mountain of less than 1,000 meters in Hakone, it looks high from Odawara, with the Evening Star shining above it, so it got its name "Myojo" which means the Evening or Morning Star. The trail from this mountain to Mount Kintoki via Mount Myōjin (Kanagawa) is one of the most popular hiking trails in Mount Hakone

In the evening of August 16, the last day of the annual Bon Festival, the Burning of the Character Big ritual (ja:大文字焼き) is conducted on Mount Myōjin, as part of the Hakone Gora Summer Festival.

== See also ==
- Fuji-Hakone-Izu National Park
