= Mount Myōjin (Kanagawa) =

Mountain in Japan

Coordinates: 35.2792°N 139.0522°E

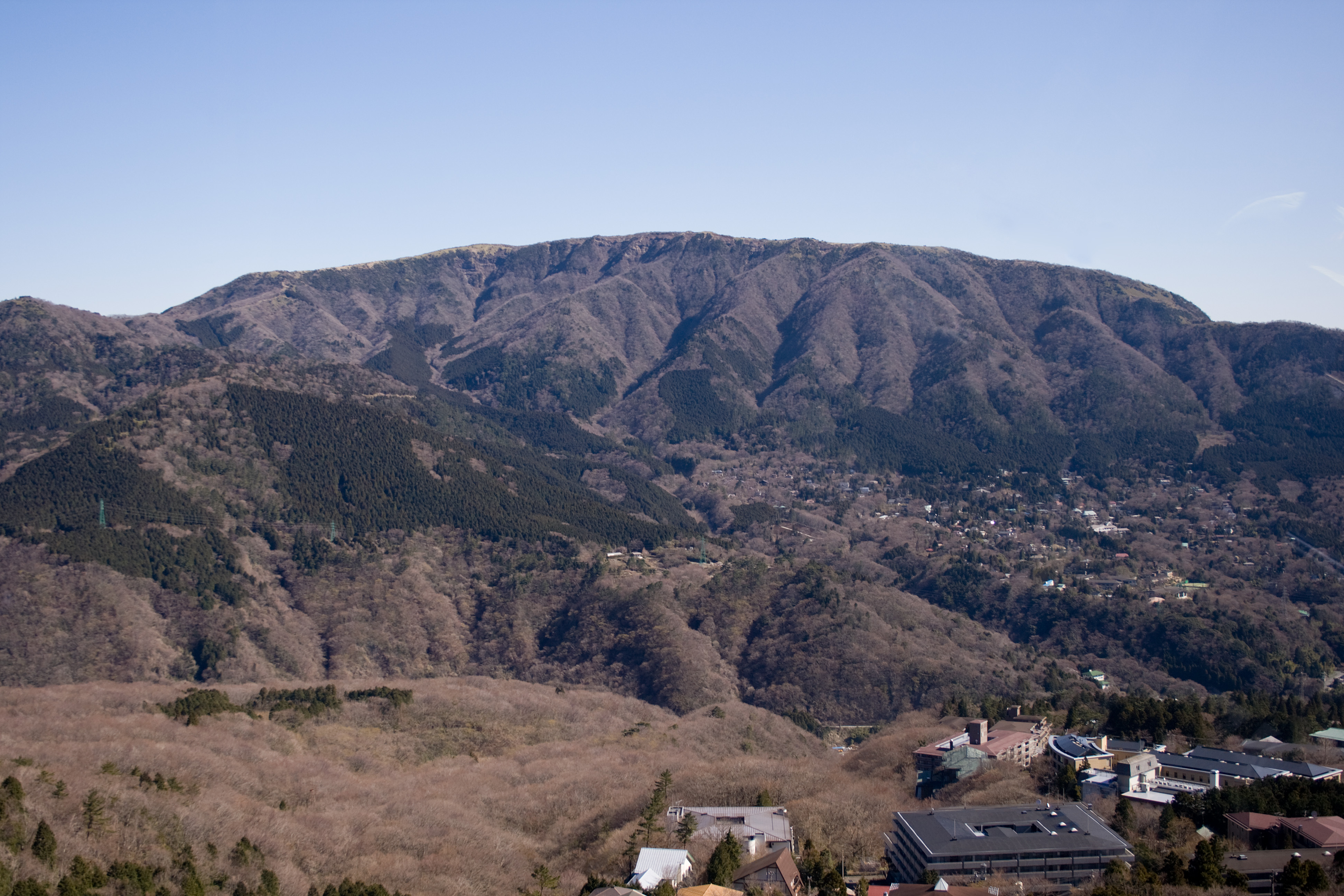
Looking at Mount Myōjin from Sōunzan Station of the Hakone Tozan Cable Car

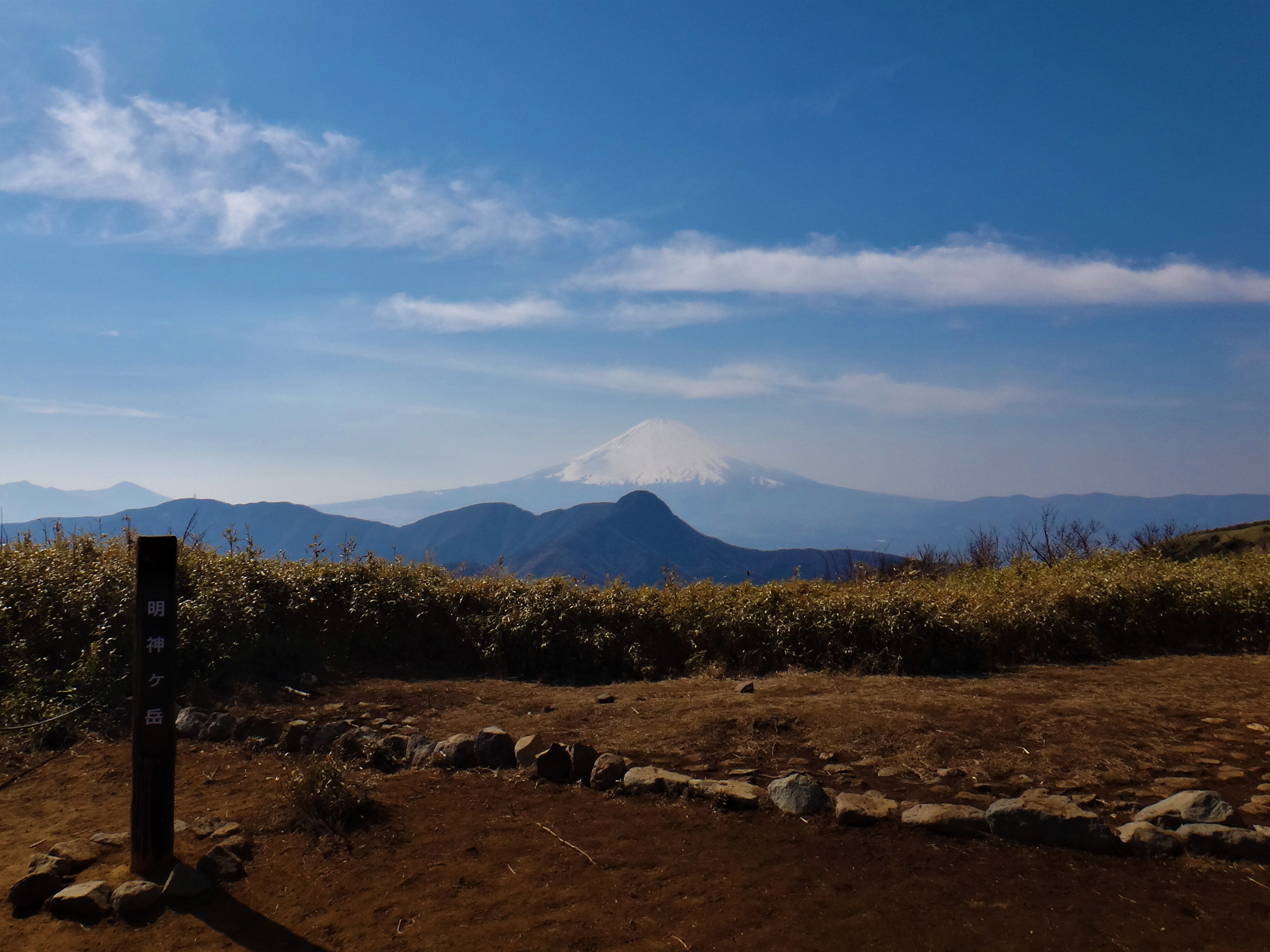
At the top of Mount Myōjin, with a view of Mount Fuji

Mount Myōjin or Myōjin-ga-take (Japanese: 明神ヶ岳) is a mountain with an altitude of 1,169 meters on the border of Minamiashigara and Hakone, Kanagawa.

== Geography ==
Mount Myōjin is one of the ancient sommas on Mount Hakone's old outer rim. It is part of the Fuji-Hakone-Izu National Park.

== Trails ==
Mount Myōjin has two major trails from the eastern and western sides, and is the most popular mountain for hikers in the Mount Hakone area, next to Mount Kintoki. There is also a long trail from Mount Myōjō via Mount Myōjin to Mount Kintoki.

== See also ==
- Fuji-Hakone-Izu National Park
