= Sagichō Fire Festival =

Japanese festival in the new year

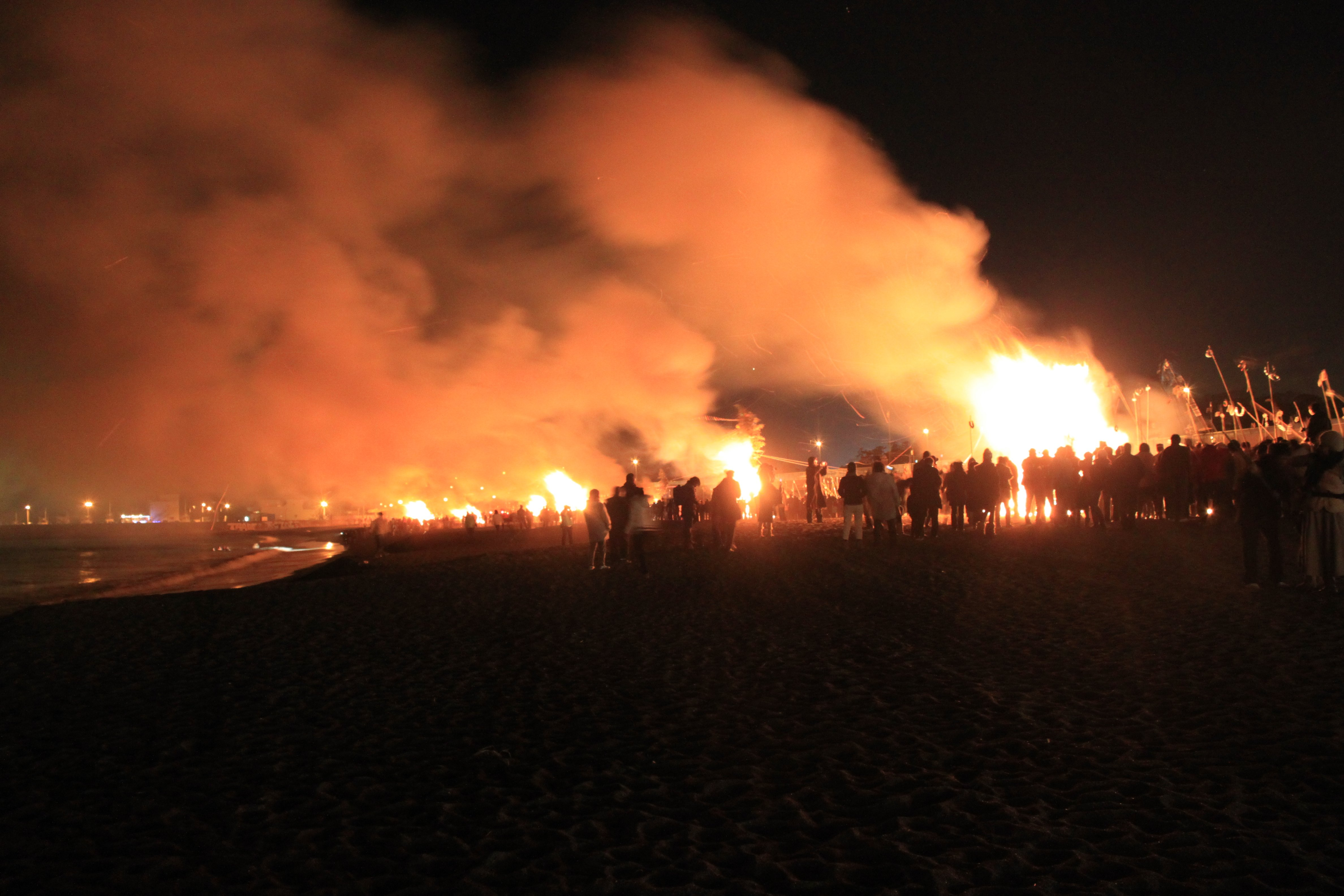
The "Sagichō" Fire Festival in Oiso, Kanagawa

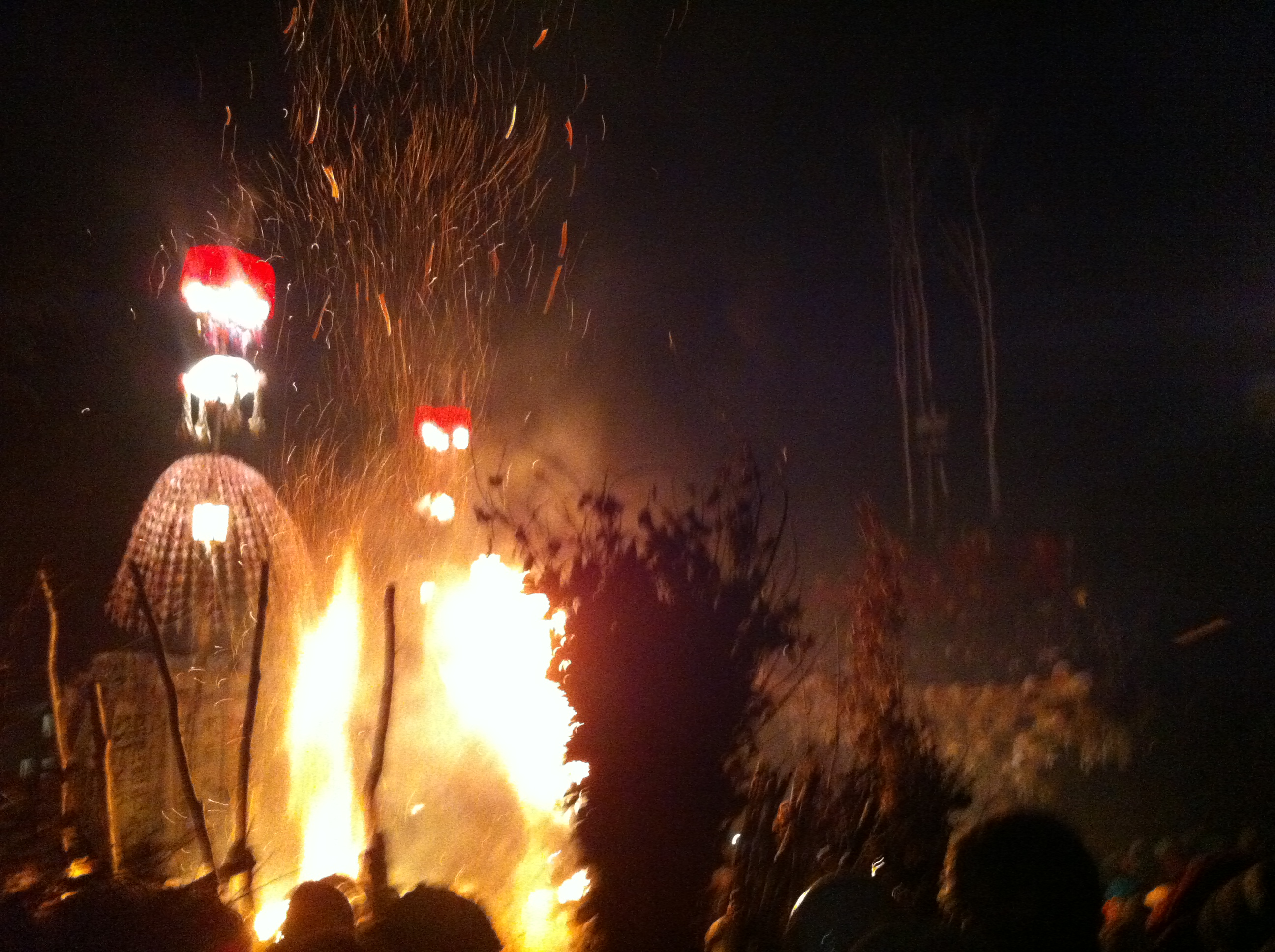
The "Dōsojin" Fire Festival in Nozawaonsen, Nagano

The Sagichō Fire Festival (Japanese: 左義長), also called Dondoyaki (Japanese: どんど焼き) or by other names, is a festival celebrated in Japan, usually on January 14 or 15. During this local event, town or village residents burn their gate pine and other New Year's decorations, as well as to pray for good fortune in the new year. Some Sagichō festivals are held at Shinto shrines.

The Sagichō fire festival has been celebrated in Japan since at least the 13th century, as it is mentioned in monk Kenkō's Tsurezuregusa. Because it used to be celebrated on January 14 or 15 in the lunar calendar, its origin may have been related to the Lantern Festival in China.

Some Sagichō fire festivals that have become famous as tourist attractions are: the Dōsojin Fire Festival celebrated in Nozawaonsen, Nagano; the Sagicho Fire Festival held on the seacoast in Oiso, Kanagawa; etc.

This festival is also celebrated at Japanese Shintoist shrines overseas, such as the Hilo Daijingu (ヒロ大神宮) in Hilo, Hawaii.

== See also ==
- Festival of Burning the Character Big (Japan)
- Lantern Festival (China)
- St. John's Fire Festival
- Festival of fire
