= Burning of the Character Big =

Japanese Buddhist ritual

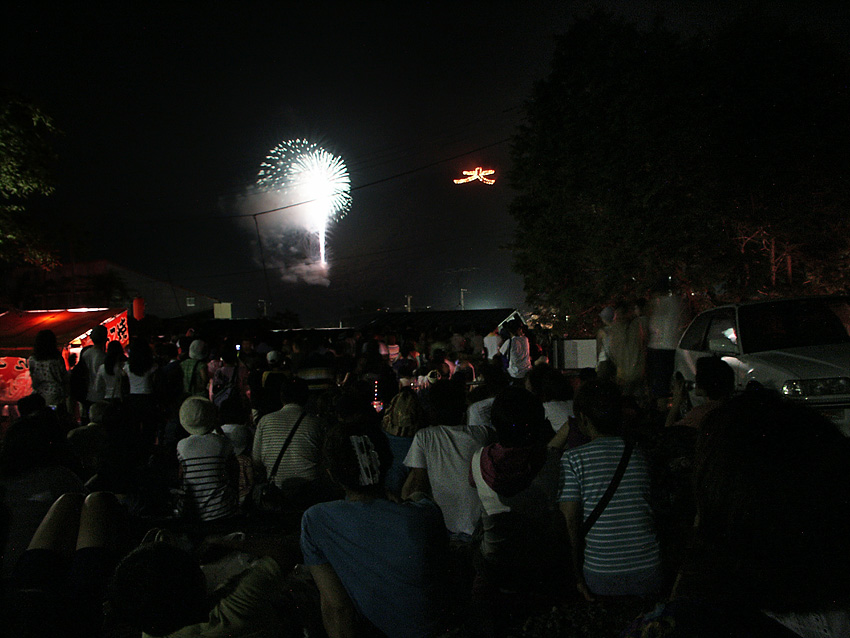
Burning of the Character Big, on Mount Myōjō, in the Hakone Mountains

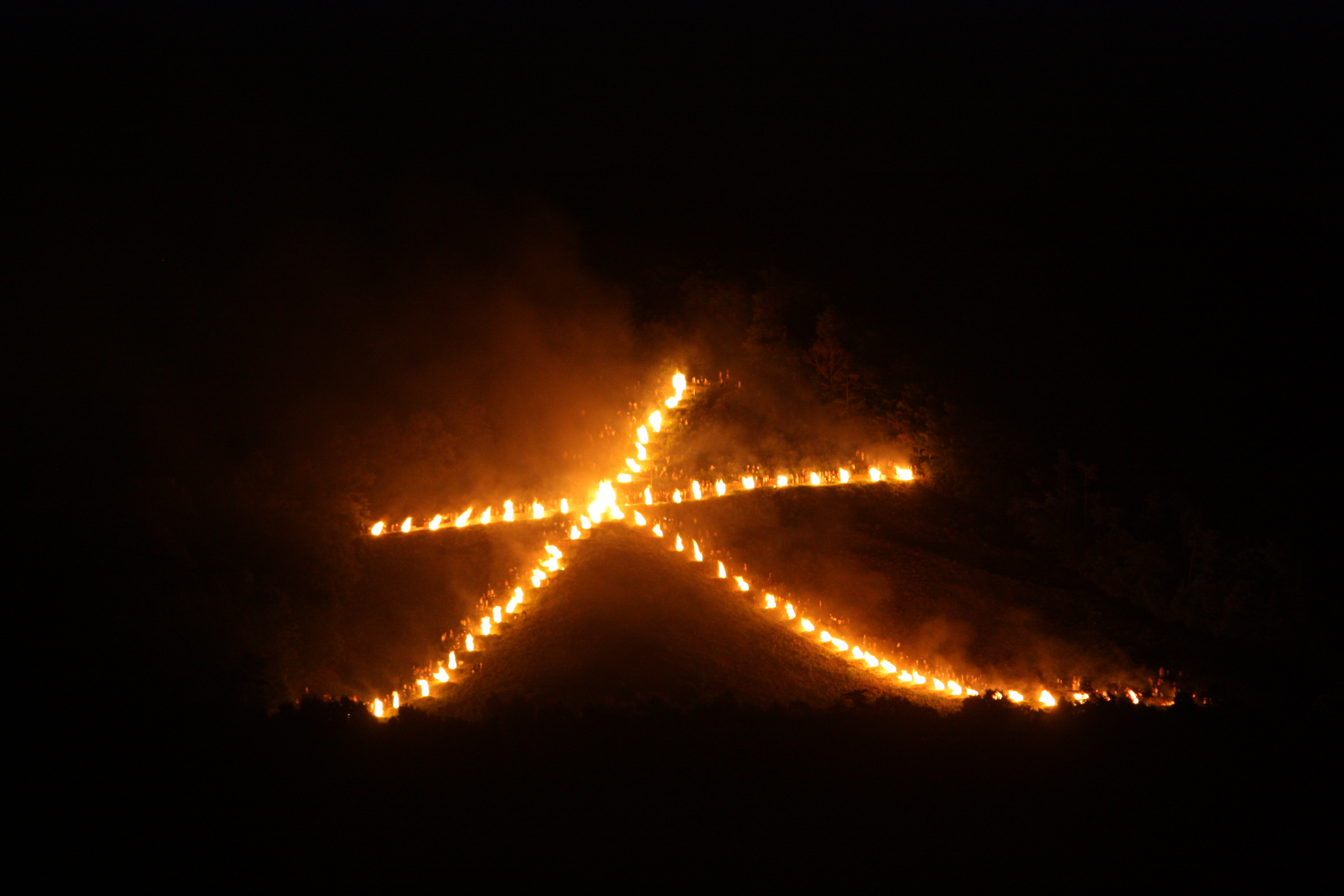
The Character Big, on Mount Nyoi, in Kyoto

The Burning of the Character "Big" (大), also known as Daimonjiyaki (Japanese: 大文字焼き) or Daimonji Festival is the Japanese Buddhist ritual of burning wood in the character "Big" (大), typically in the mountain, on the last day of the 4-day Bon Festival to send back to the other world the spirits of the family ancestors that they welcomed on the first day.

There are many locations in Japan where this ritual is held. In western Japan, the Okuribi of the Five Mountains (Gozan no Okuribi) or simply called "Daimonji", celebrated in Kyoto, is the most famous, while in eastern Japan, the ritual during the Hakone Gora Summer Festival with the fire burned on Mount Myōjō in the Hakone Mountains is relatively well known because of its proximity to Tokyo.

== See also ==
- Bon Festival
- Farewell Fires of the Five Mountains in Kyoto
- Sagichō Fire Festival
