= Onsen tamago =

Japanese egg dish cooked in an onsen

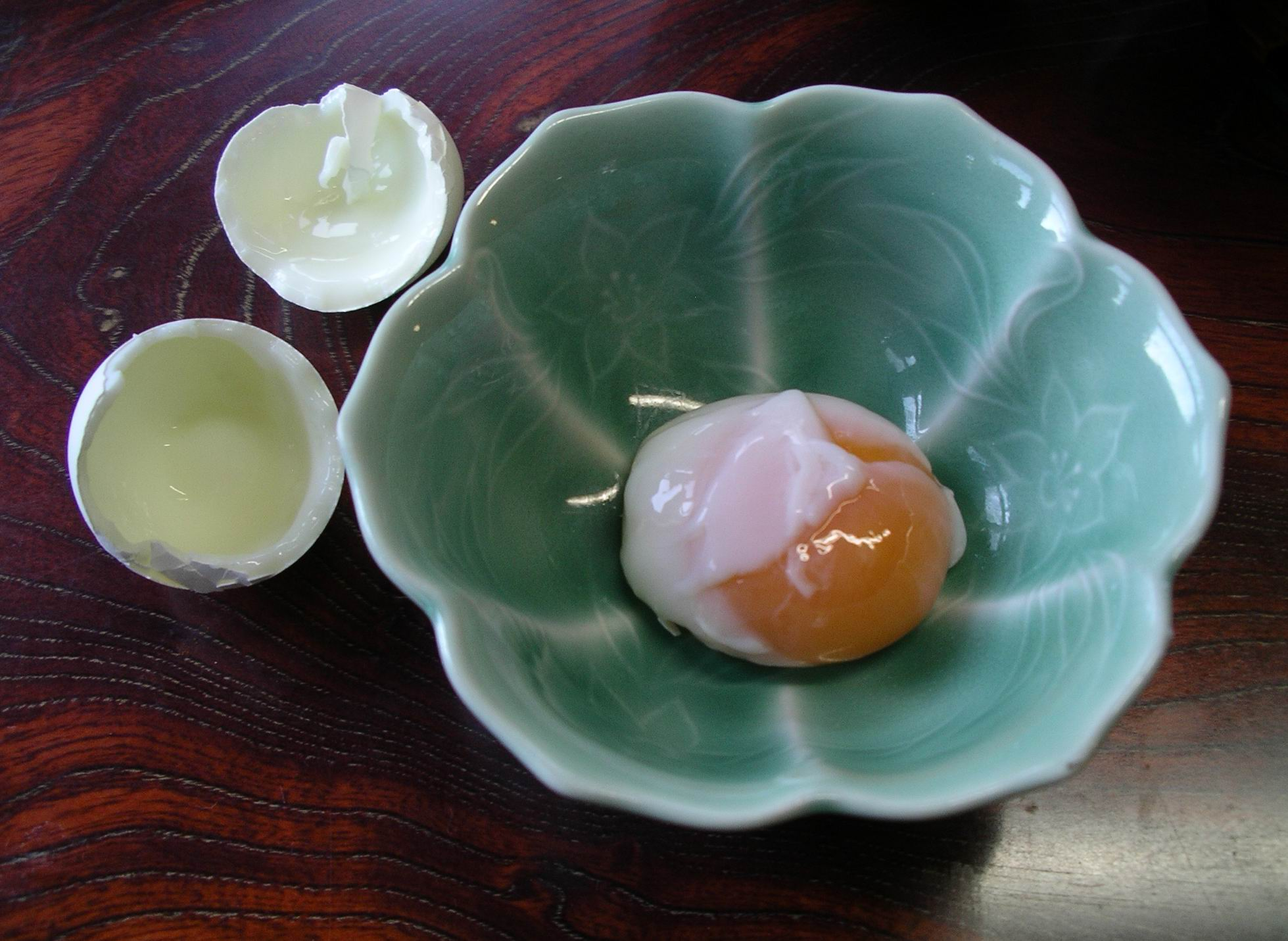
- Onsen tamago
- Alternative names: Hot spring egg
- Course: Snack, breakfast
- Place of origin: Japan
- Main ingredients: chicken egg

Onsen tamago (Japanese: 温泉卵 or 温泉玉子, lit. 'hot spring egg') is a traditional Japanese low temperature boiled egg which is slow cooked in the hot waters of onsen (hot springs) in Japan.

The egg has a unique texture in that the white tastes like a delicate custard (milky and soft) and the yolk comes out firm, but retains the colour and creamy texture. This special texture is the result of cooking it in a temperature high enough to solidify the yolk yet too low to solidify the white.

== Preparation ==
Onsen eggs for sale at Unzen Jigoku, Unzen

The traditional way of cooking onsen tamago is to place eggs into rope nets and leave them in an onsen, with water that is approximately 65 °C (149 °F) to 68 °C (154 °F) for 20 minutes.

It can also be made at home.

Ready-made products are available at supermarkets throughout Japan.

The egg is poached within the shell. After cooking, the shell is cracked open and the egg is served in seasoned bonito dashi (Japanese stock) or soy sauce, with chopped spring onions sprinkled over the top.
