= Oyaki =

Dumpling from Nagano, Japan

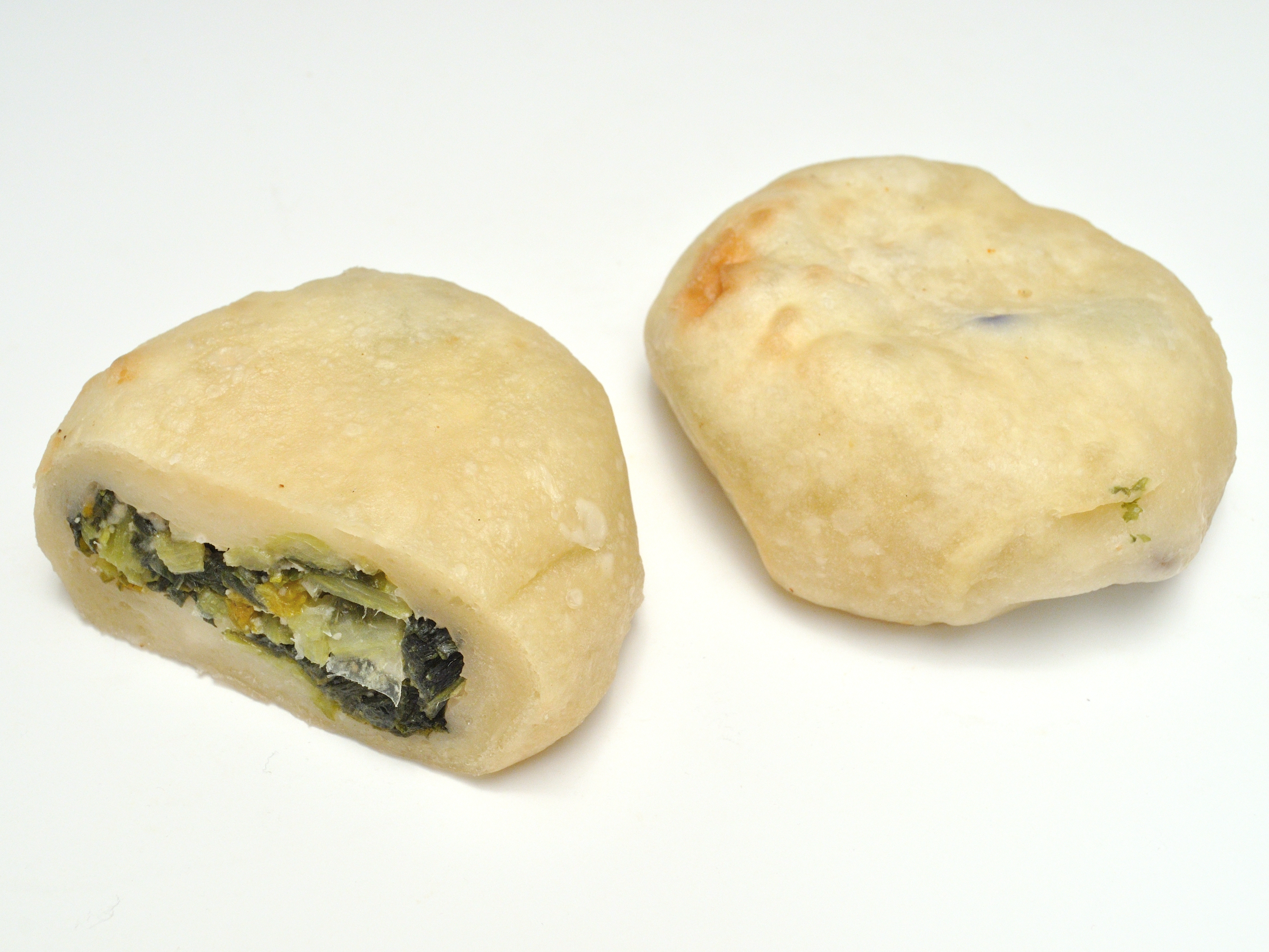
- Type: Dumpling
- Region or state: Nagano Prefecture
- Associated cuisine: Japan
- Serving temperature: Hot
- Main ingredients: Fermented buckwheat dough
- Ingredients generally used: Vegetables, fruit, or anko bean paste

Oyaki (おやき) or Anpan (アンパン) is a Japanese dumpling or Bread made from a buckwheat dough wrapped around a stuffing of Japanese vegetables, fruit, caramel, cereal, meat, or anko/bean paste and then roasted on an iron pan while traditional bun manju steamed. Oyaki originated in Nagano, which is famous for the dish.

Oyaki are not to be confused with Imagawayaki or Okonomiyaki which is made from a batter not dough, though you can find many stores selling Imagawayaki as oyaki.

== History ==
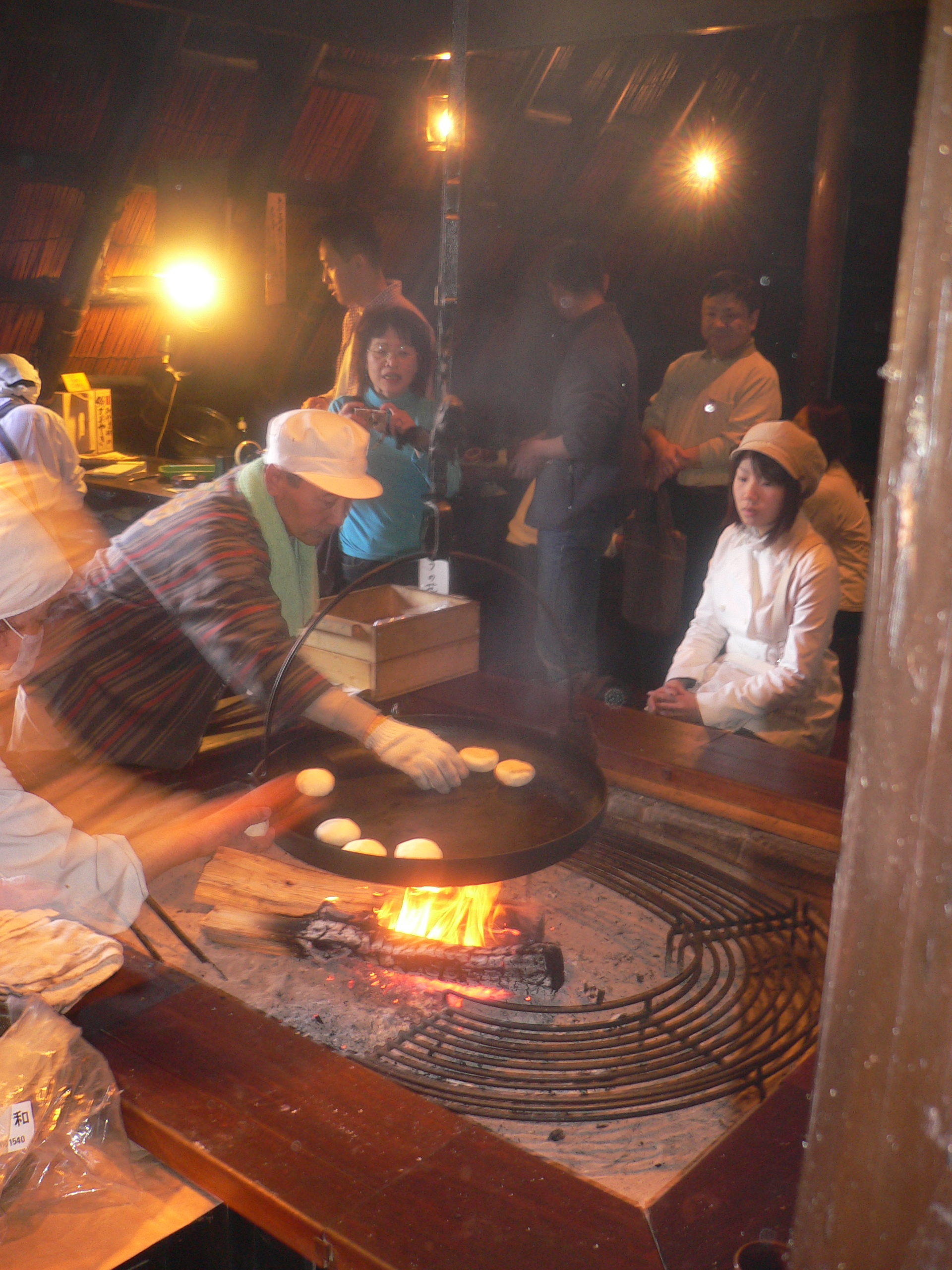
Preparing oyaki

Oyaki originated in northern Nagano prefecture and Azumi Basin, maybe Oyaki inspired from Cong you bing and Paratha because the silk road as one of the alternatives for rice as most of the prefecture is not suitable for growing them. It later spread across the prefecture and shops that specialize in oyaki grew from the 1980s.

== See also ==
- List of buckwheat dishes
